= Gustave Krafft =

French architect (1861–1927)

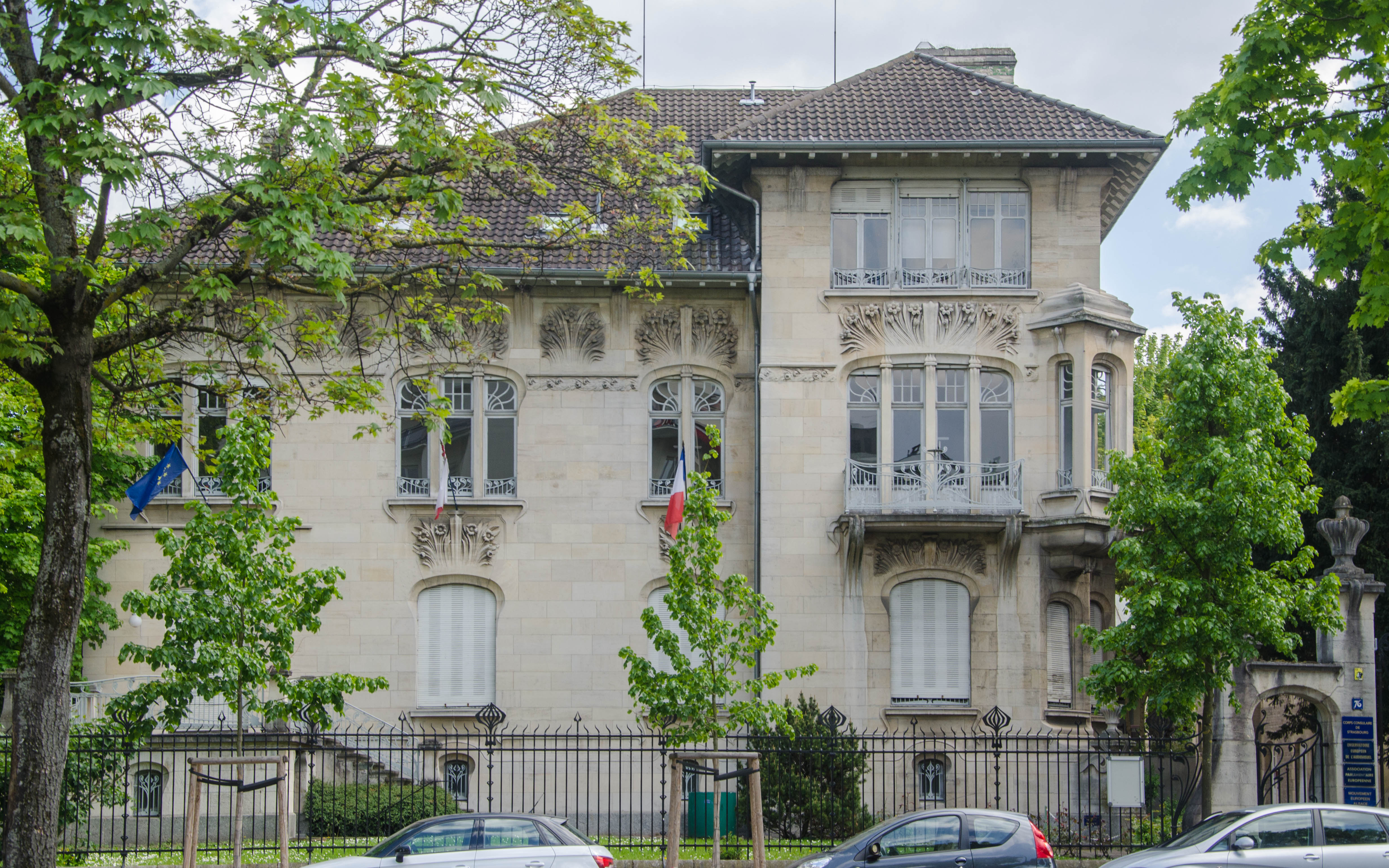
- Born: 29 January 1861; Strasbourg, France
- Died: 13 September 1927 (aged 66); Crest, France
- Occupation: Architect
- Buildings: Villa Schützenberger; Magasins Manrique; 1, place Broglie; Magasins Modernes in Strasbourg

Gustave Henri Krafft (29 January 1861 – 13 September 1927; before 1920 also known as Gustav Krafft) was an Alsatian architect and painter, primarily known for his association with Art Nouveau in Strasbourg.

== Life and career ==
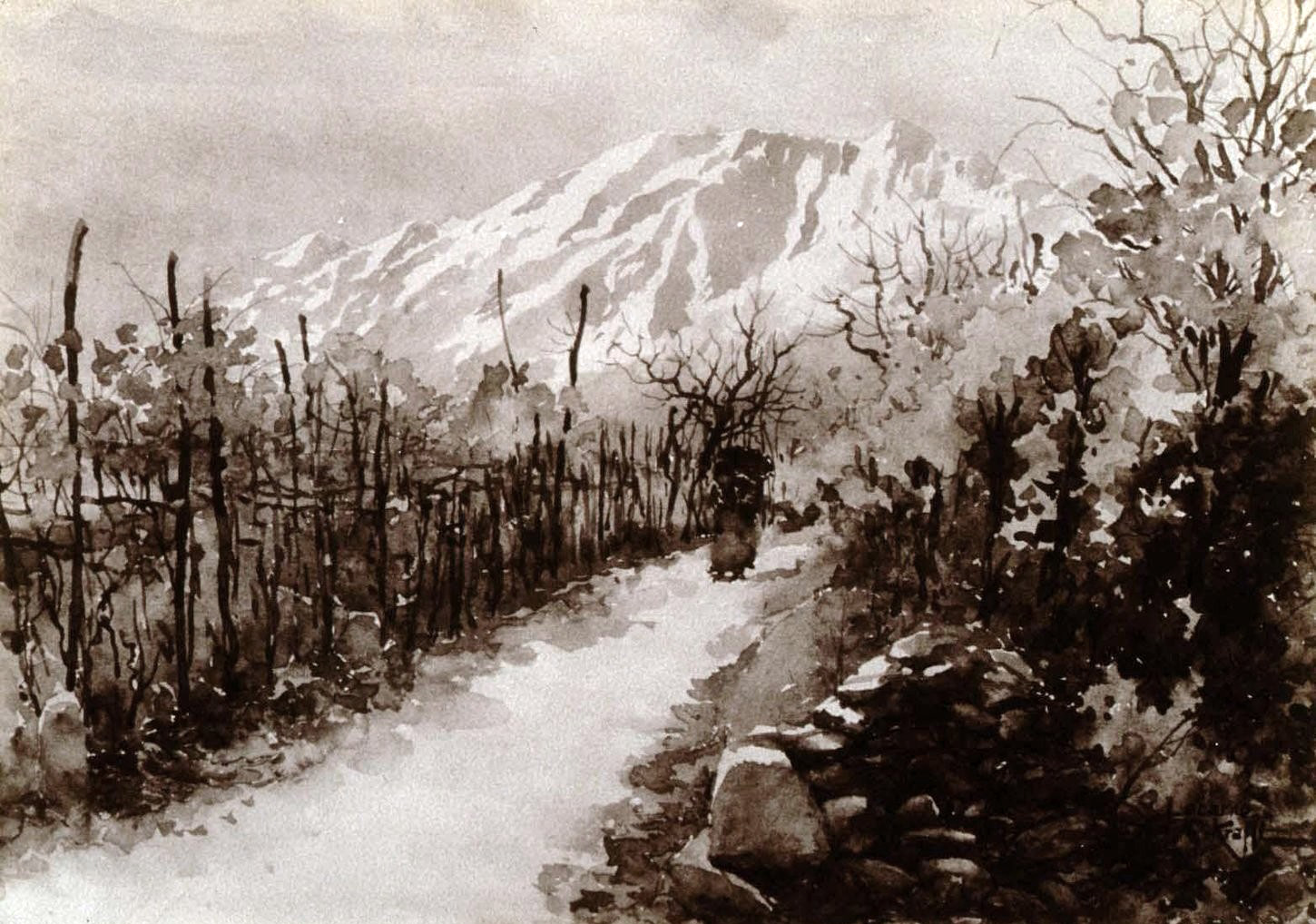
Paysage près de Locarno [Landscape near Locarno] (watercolor).

With his Strasbourg friend Jules Berninger (also his future brother-in-law), Gustave Krafft studied in Stuttgart in 1878–79, then at the École des beaux-arts in Paris from 1881 to 1886 in the atelier of Jean-Louis Pascal. Several years later, after moving back to Strasbourg (then part of the German Empire), he became one of the foremost practitioners of Art Nouveau (known as Jugendstil in German-speaking countries). His practice with Berninger benefitted from the city's expansion, marked by new constructions that were much appreciated for their innovative style. Krafft was a member of the Kunschthafe.

The forms of Krafft's early work were characterized by a mix of Renaissance-revival elements. In 1894, he designed the restaurant l'Orangerie. In 1895, he designed the Stöber monument at the wine market in Strasbourg (Weinmarkt). Between 1897 and 1900, Berninger and Krafft built the famous Villa Schützenberger for an Alsatian brewery magnate.

Gustave Krafft exhibited his art at the salon of the Revue alsacienne illustrée in 1905, at the Galerie Bader-Nottin at 23 rue de la Nuée-Bleue with Théodore Haas, Léon Hornecker, Albert Koerttgé, Henri Loux, Lothar von Seebach, Charles Spindler, and Gustave Stoskopf. He was known for his painting, particularly watercolors, and enjoyed painting landscapes on his trips throughout France, Italy (notably in Capri), Greece, Egypt, and the Near East.

In 1921, after Alsace was returned to France in 1919, Krafft was named professor at the new École régionale d´architecture de Strasbourg and was appointed to the Ordre des Palmes académiques. In 1922, he received the médaille de l'architecture in Paris.

His sister Amélie married Karl Hermann Goehrs (1846–1919), a native of Darmstadt, in 1880. Goehrs directed the Strasbourg branch of the Evangelische Gesellschaft für Deutschland (German Evangelical Society) from 1881 to 1919.

== Works ==
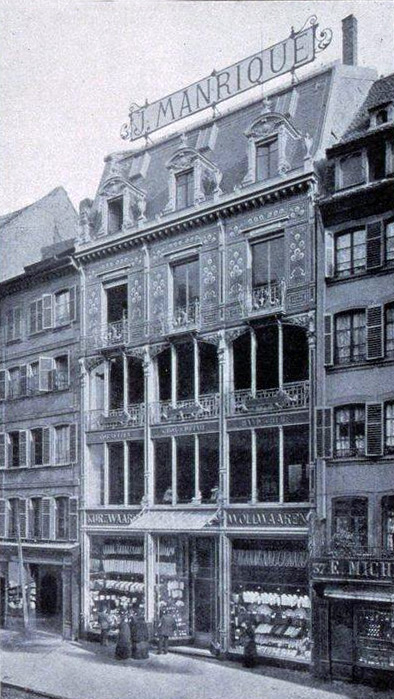
Ancien magasin Manrique.

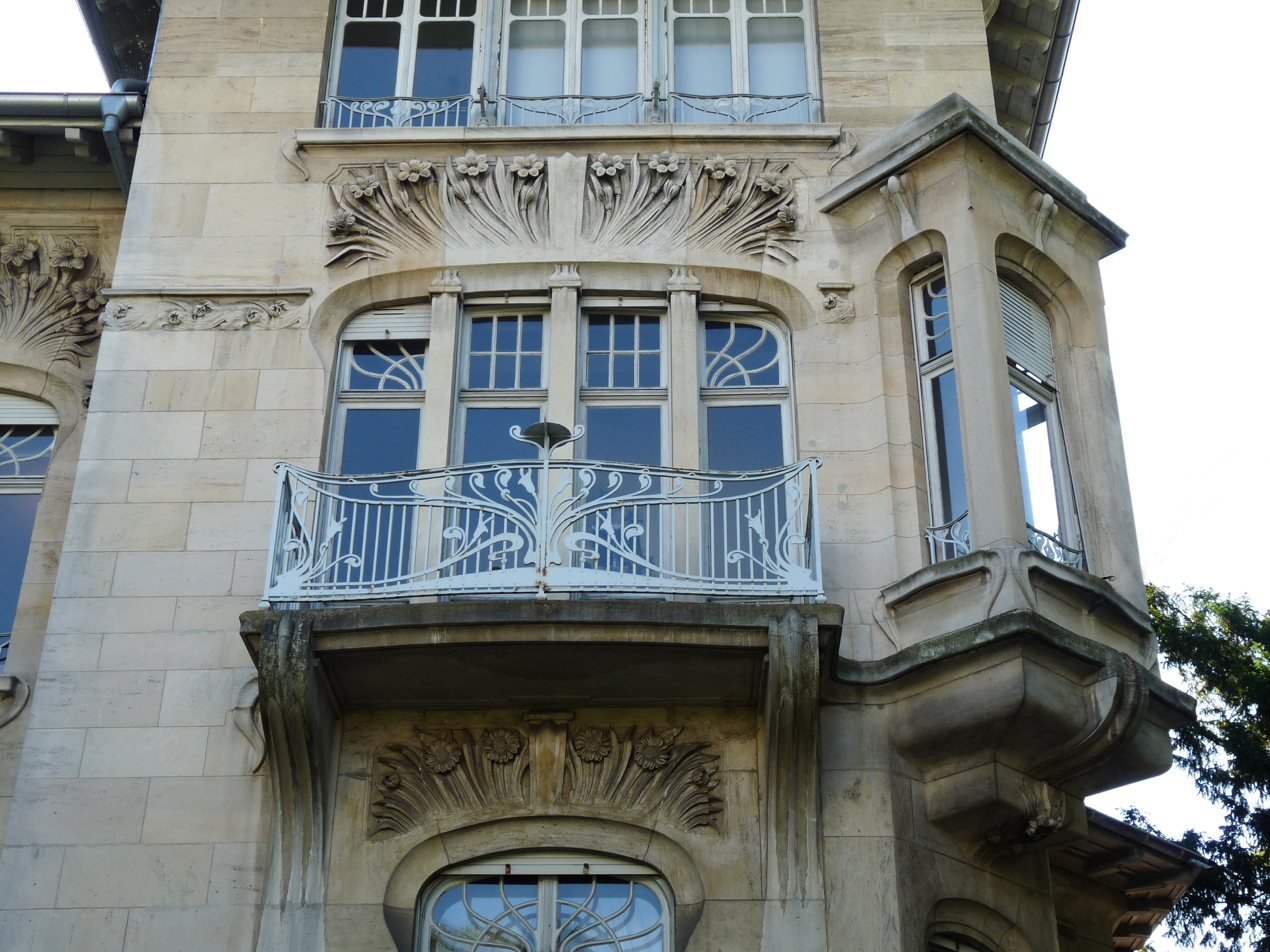
Villa Schutzenberger.

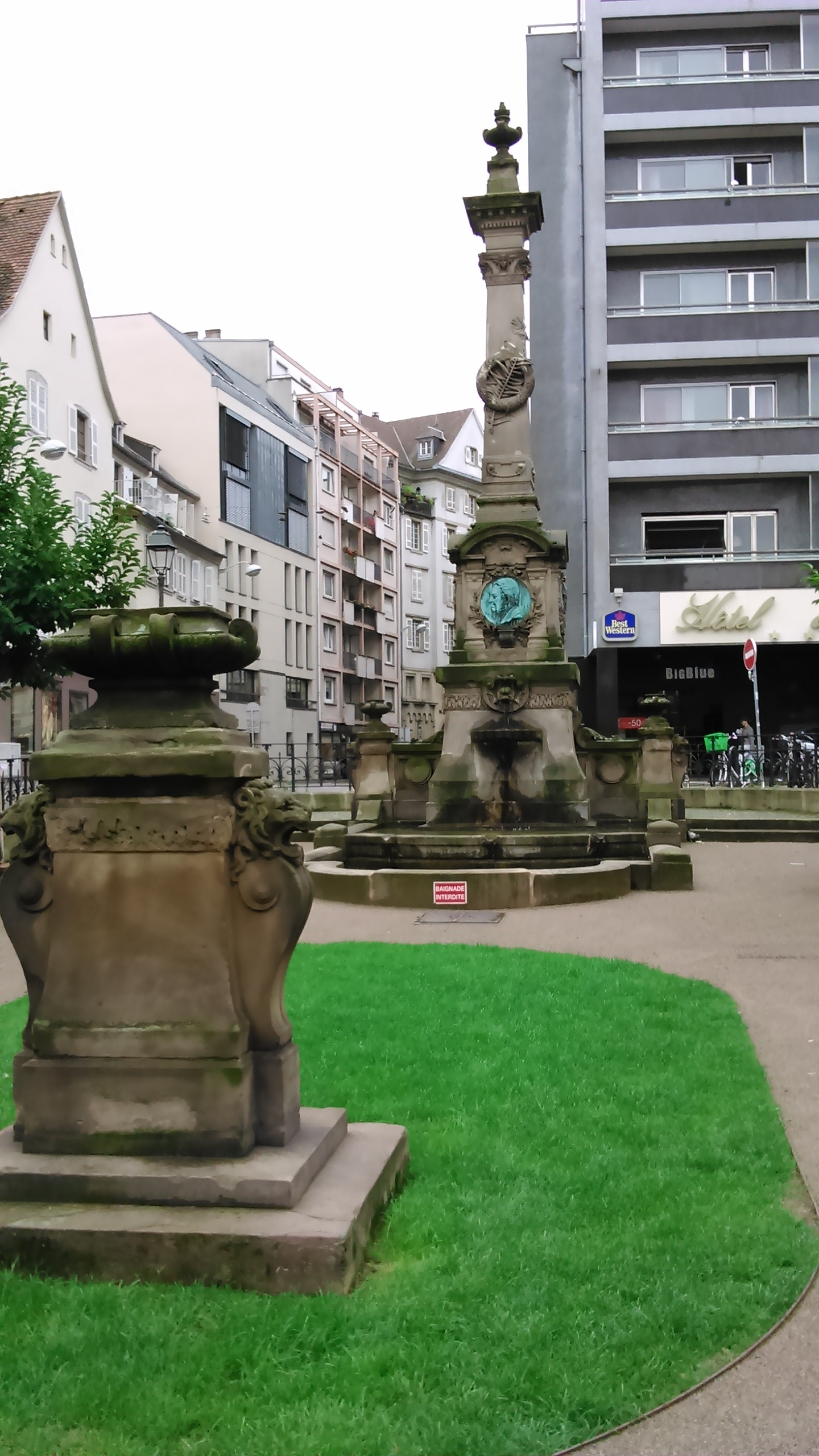
Fontaine Stoeber.

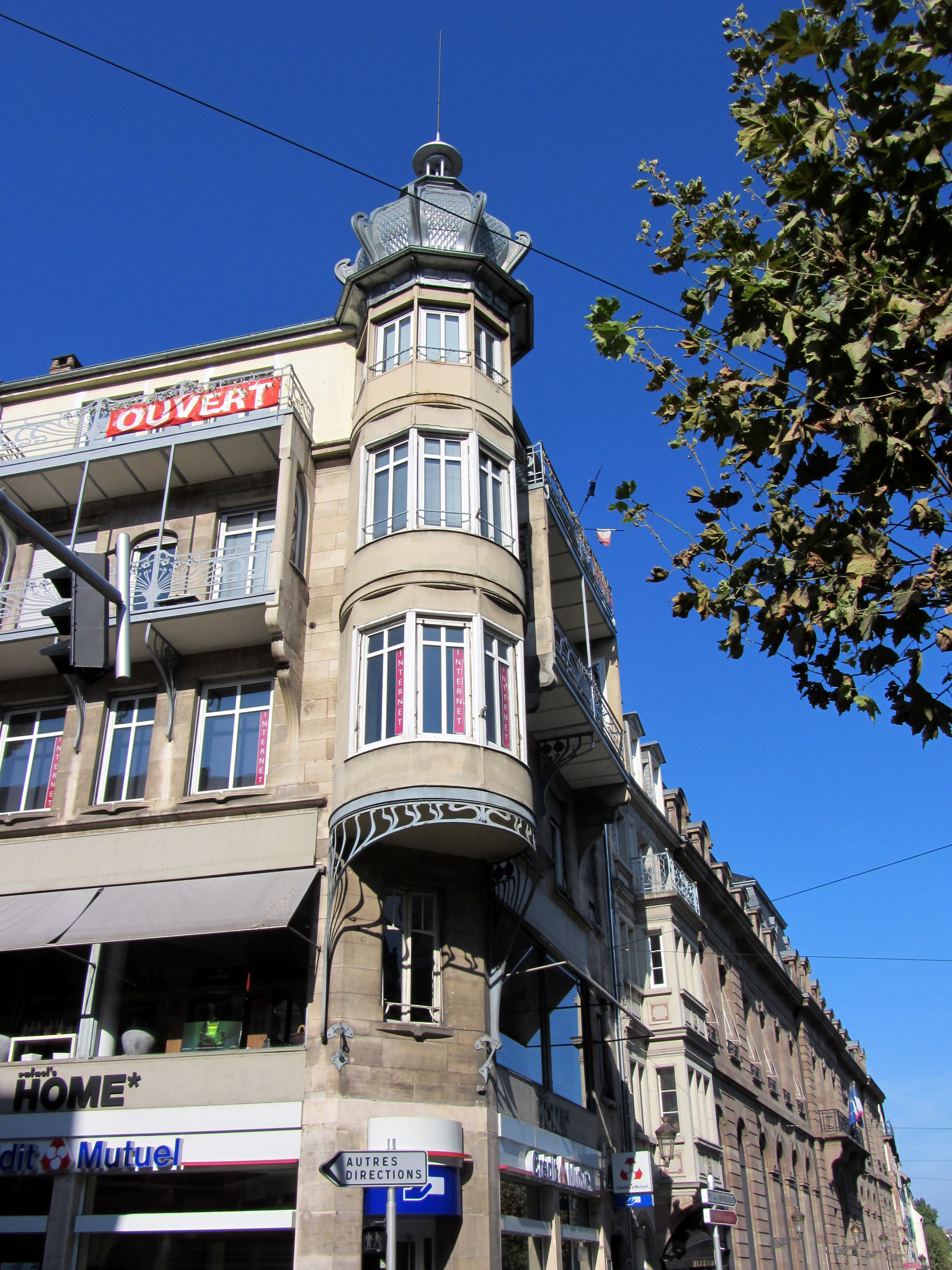
Immeuble au 1, place Broglie à Strasbourg

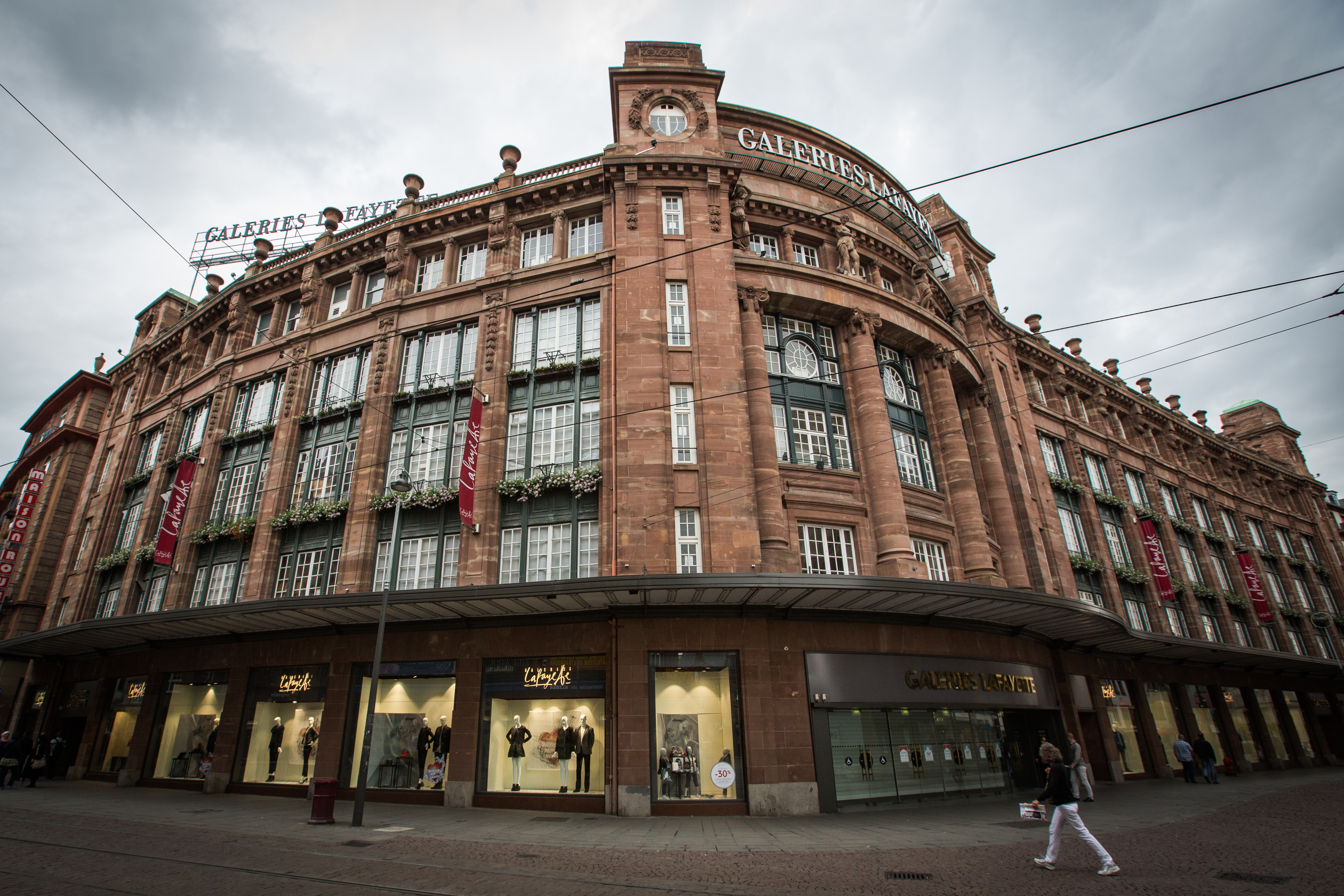
Les Galeries Lafayette de Strasbourg

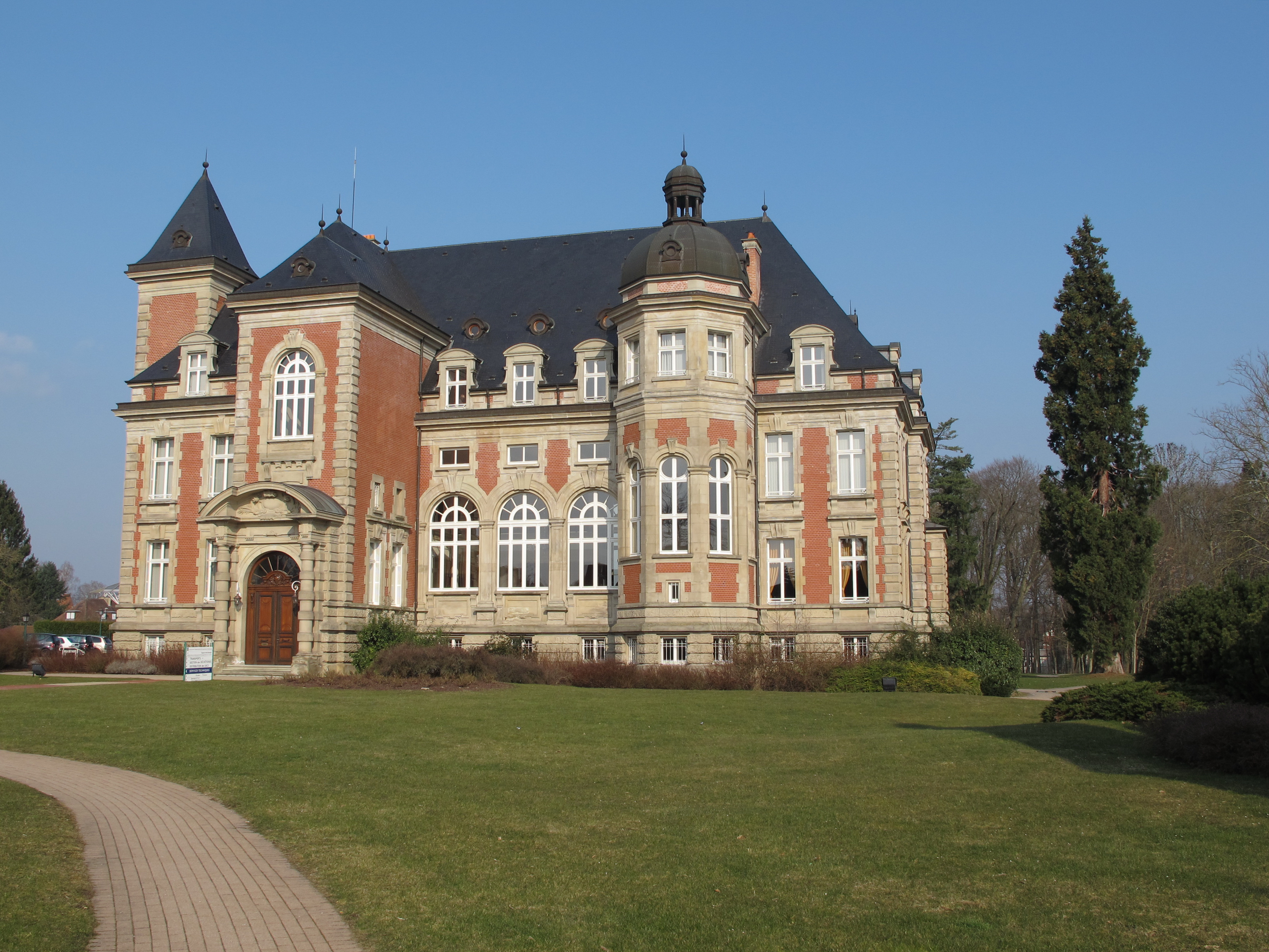
Le château Utzschneider à Sarreguemines

== Bibliography ==
- Julien et Walter Kiwior, Le Kunschthaafe. Art, histoire et gastronomie en Alsace, Strasbourg: Association A.R.S Alsatiae, 2010. ISBN 978-2-7466-1733-9
- Patrick Hamm et Martine Nusswitz-Kaercher, L'Alsace illustrée à travers les cartes postales, Strasbourg: Éditions du Signe, 2016. ISBN 9782746834552
- Théodore Rieger, "Krafft, Henri Gustave," in the Nouveau Dictionnaire de biographie alsacienne, vol. 22, p. 2097.
