= Art Nouveau in Strasbourg =

Local implementation of a style of architecture and design

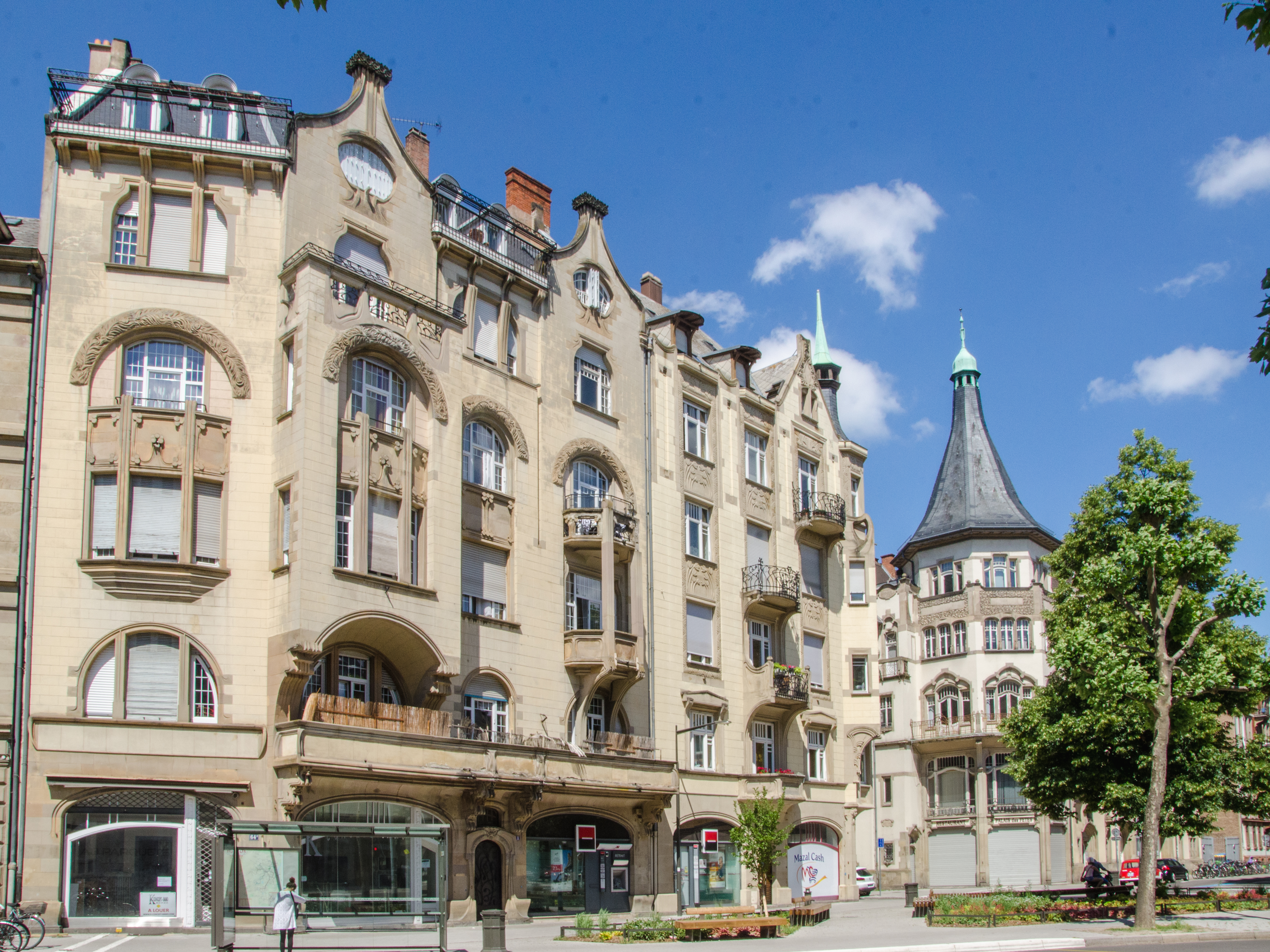
1, rue Sellénick (1904); 3, rue Sellénick (1904); and Palais des Fêtes (from left to right)

Art Nouveau in Strasbourg developed and was cultivated as a mixture of French influences, especially from the École de Nancy, and Germanic influences, particularly Darmstadt Artists' Colony and Vienna Secession, with some influences of Brussels Art Nouveau added. That synthesis reflected both the position of Strasbourg as a crossroads of European cultures, and the search for a specific identity of the locals, who had been incorporated into the German Empire some 30 years prior, after two centuries of French domination.

== Architecture ==
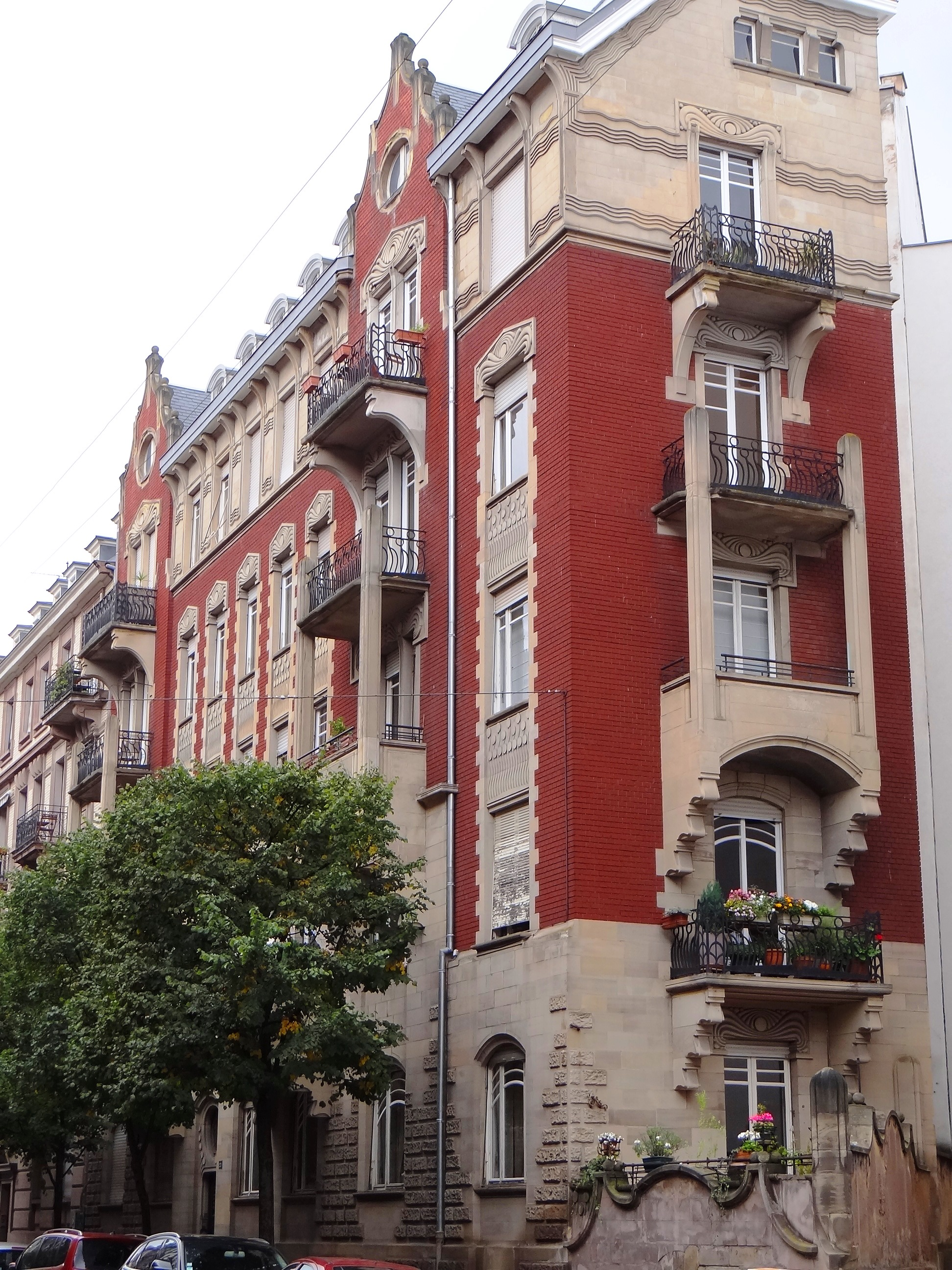
23, rue Oberlin (1904), by Lütke & Backes

Art Nouveau houses (multi-story buildings and villas), department stores, and other public buildings such as a concert hall, and a church, were built in the years 1898–1910 in the Neustadt district, the Neudorf district, the historic city center, and in the Krutenau district. Most of these have survived World War II and the changes of taste, and many are classified as Monuments historiques. The most notable architects were the associates Franz Lütke (1860–1929) and Heinrich Backes (1866–1931); Jules (Julius) Berninger (1856–1926) and Gustave (Gustav) Krafft (1861–1927); Joseph Müller (1863–??) and Richard Kuder; David Falk (1875–1949) and Émile Wolf (1874–??); Auguste Mossler (1873–1947) and Auguste Müller (1863–1936), as well as the unaffiliated Fritz Beblo, Auguste Brion (1861–1940), Samuel Landshut (1860–1919), Waldemar Osterloff, and Aloys Walter (1869–1926).

The following Art Nouveau buildings have been classified as Monuments historiques:

- Allée de la Robertsau: No. 56, No. 76
- Avenue des Vosges: No. 46
- Place Broglie: No. 1
- Place Sainte-Madeleine: Église Sainte-Madeleine
- Rue Erckmann-Chatrian: No. 4
- Rue du Faubourg-de-Saverne: No. 15
- Rue des Grandes-Arcades: Nos. 33, 35, 37 (former department store)
- Rue du Général-de-Castelnau: No. 22
- Rue de Phalsbourg: Palais des Fêtes
- Rue Sleidan: No. 22
- Rue Twinger: No. 24

== Fine and decorative arts ==
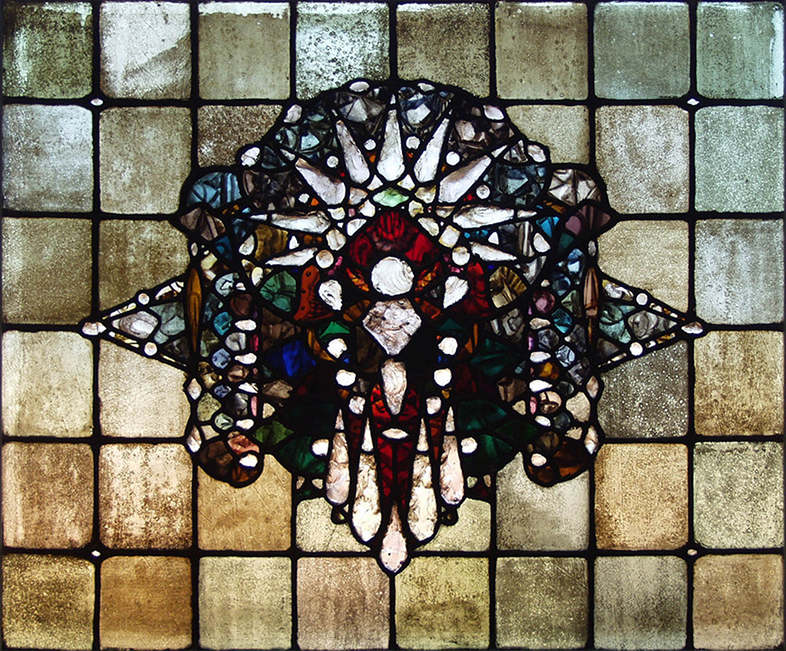
Decorative stained-glass composition by Joseph Ehrismann (MAMCS)

The artists Charles Spindler, Jean-Désiré Ringel d'Illzach, Joseph Sattler, Auguste Cammissar, Léon Elchinger (1871-1942), Joseph Ehrismann, August Herborth, Anton Seder were all active in and around Strasbourg in the Art Nouveau period, and shaped many of its local traits. These artists, as well several others who were not drawn to Art Nouveau/Jugendstil (Alfred Marzolff, Léo Schnug, Lothar von Seebach, Gustave Stoskopf...), were members of the Cercle de Saint-Léonard, a francophile circle of painters, playwrights, sculptors, and designers, established in 1897 and strongly attached to redefining and reinventing Alsatian regionalist art. François-Rupert Carabin, born in Saverne and buried in Strasbourg, did not spend the Art Nouveau years in Alsace-Lorraine; nevertheless, due to his having become the director of the École des arts décoratifs de Strasbourg after World War I, the Strasbourg Museum of Modern and Contemporary Art owns a large and representative collection of his works in all domains.

== Gallery ==
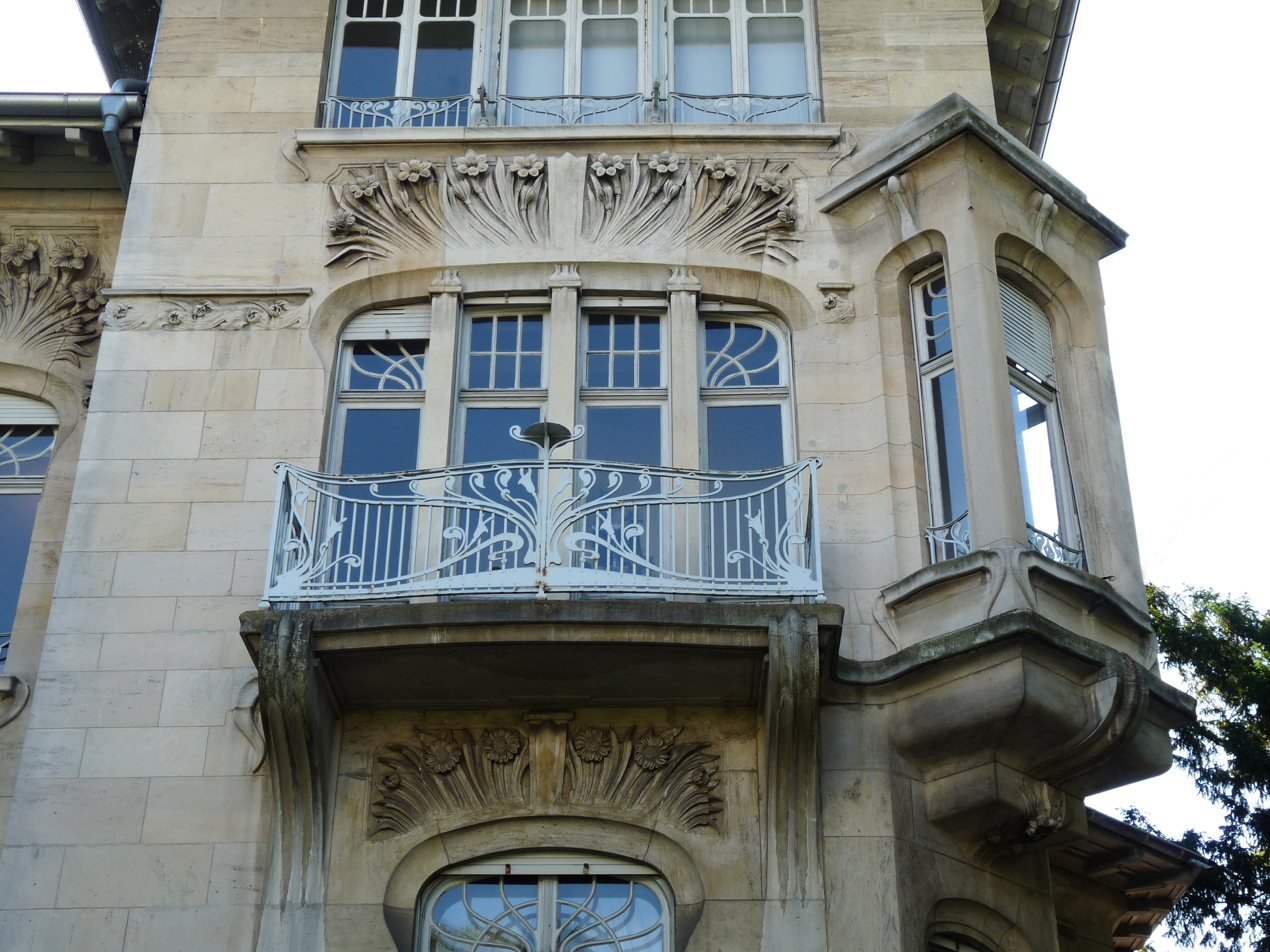
Detail of Villa Schutzenberger

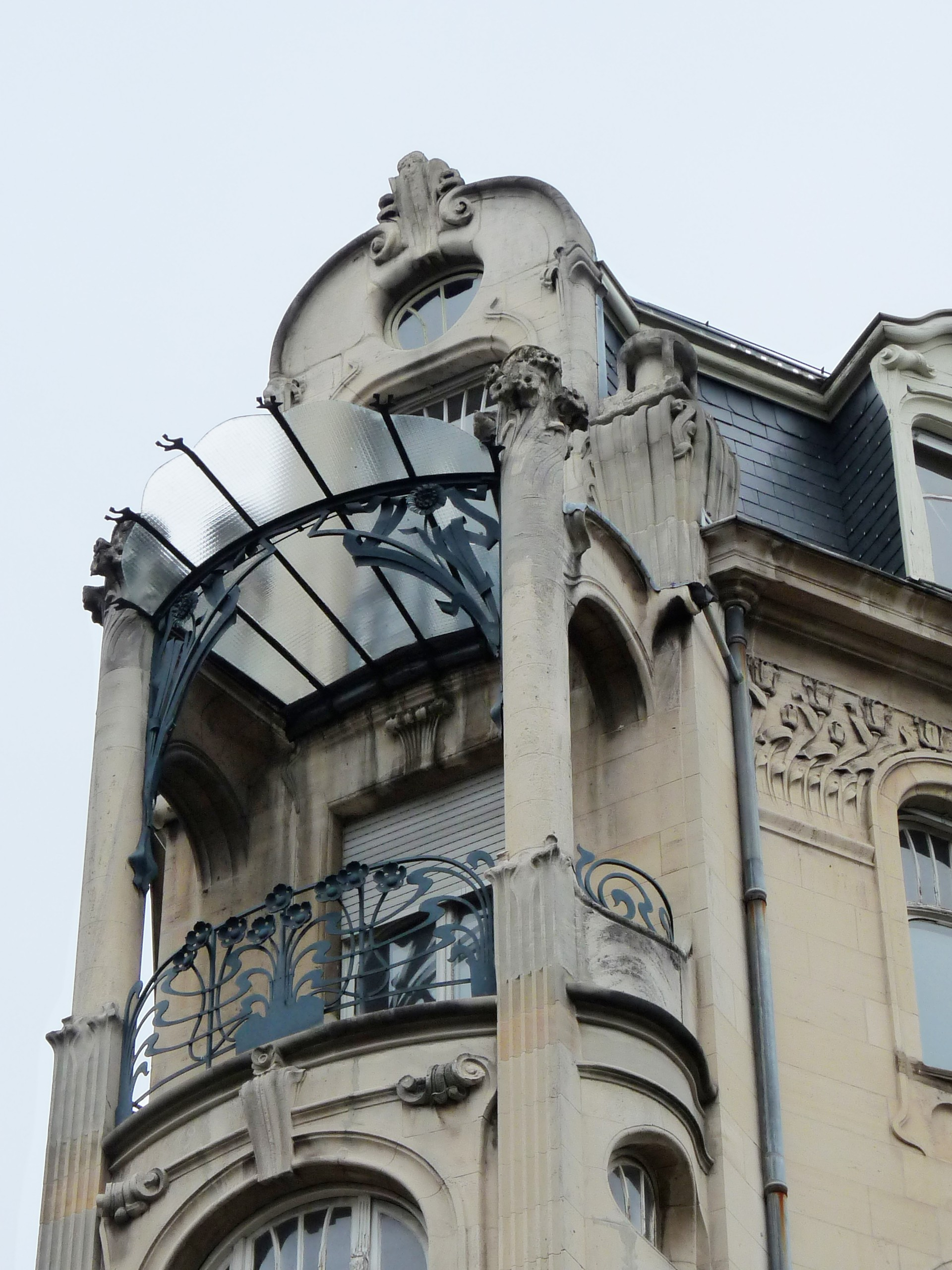
Detail of 22, Rue du Général de Castelnau

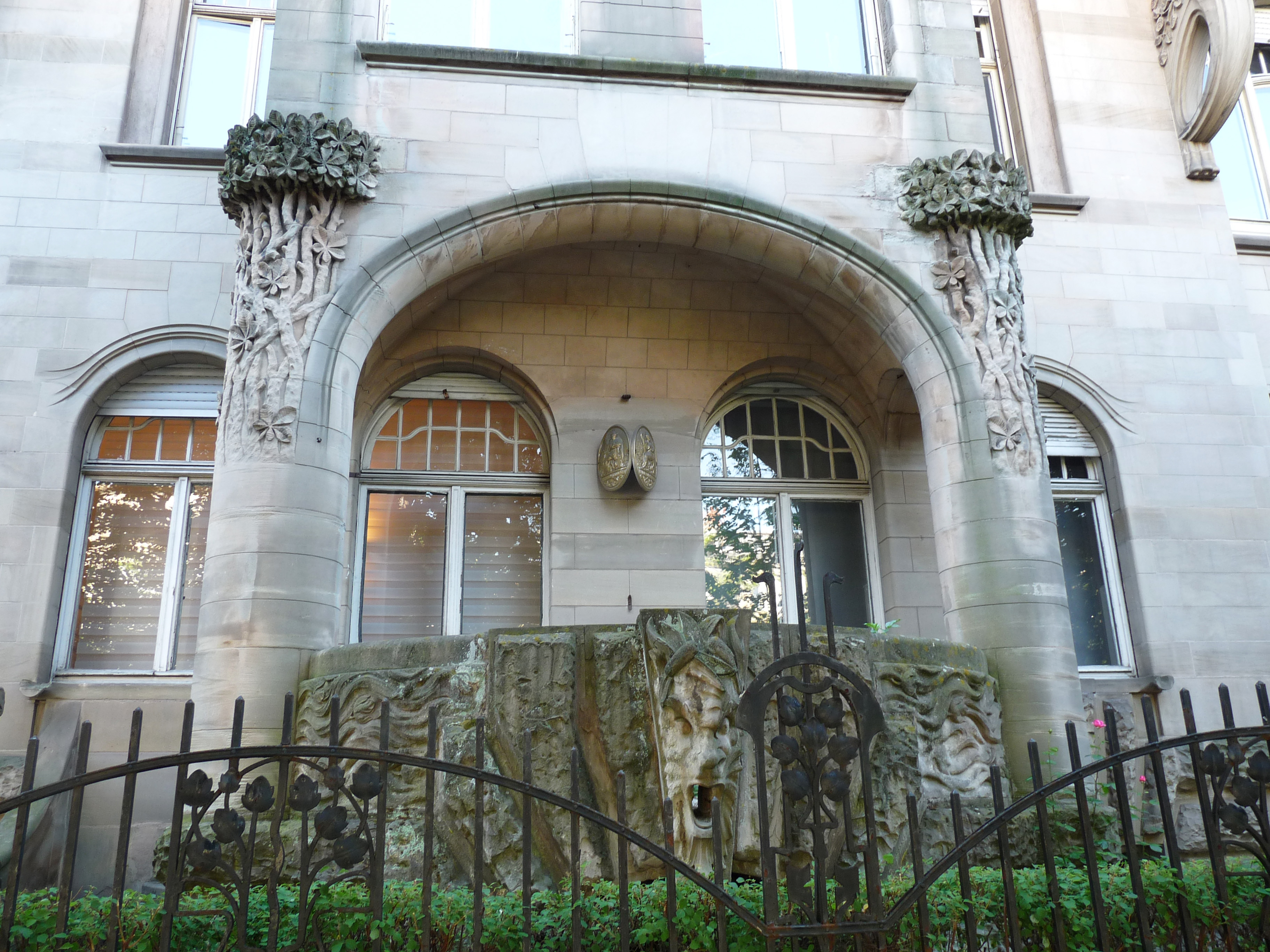
Detail of 56, Allée de la Robertsau

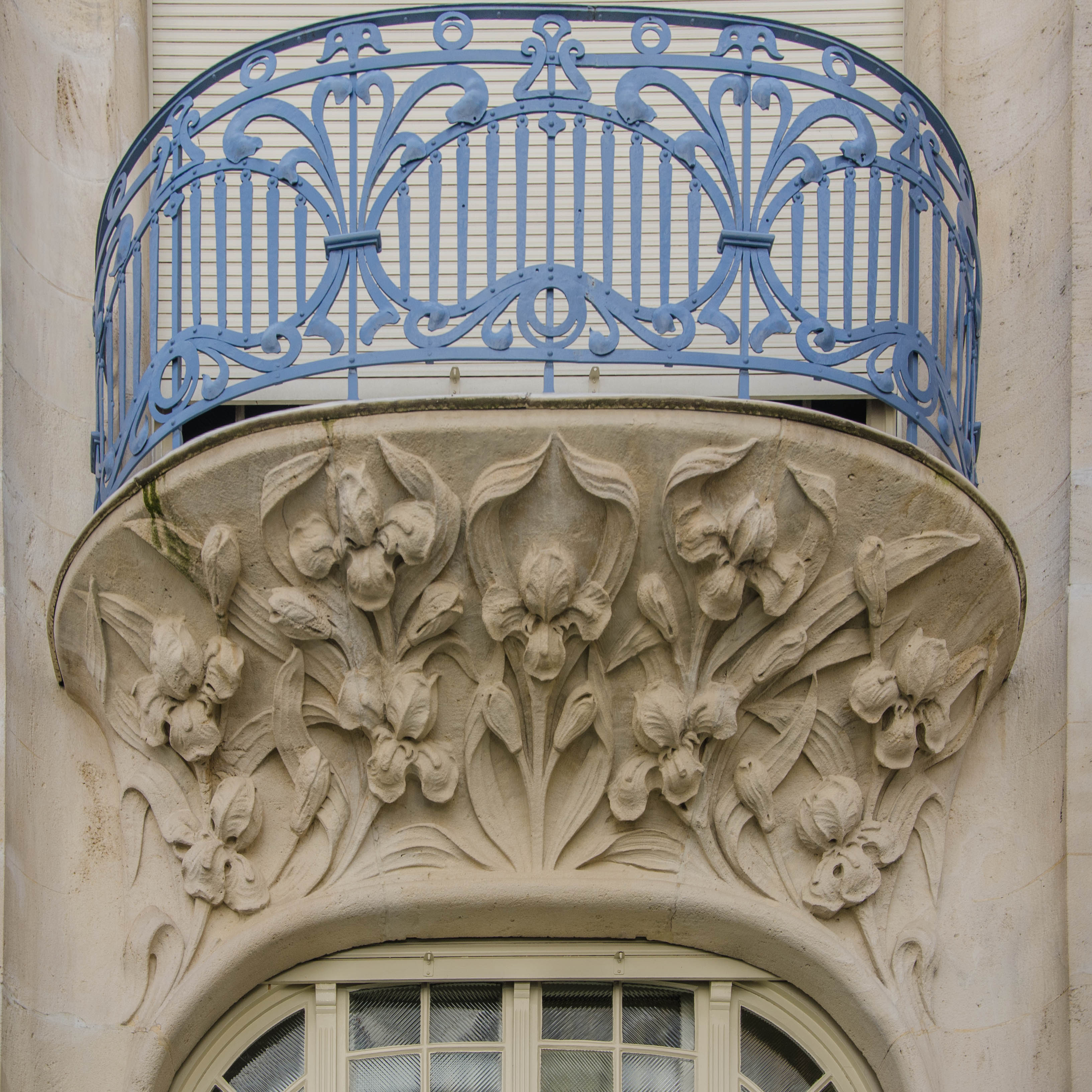
Detail of Hôtel Brion

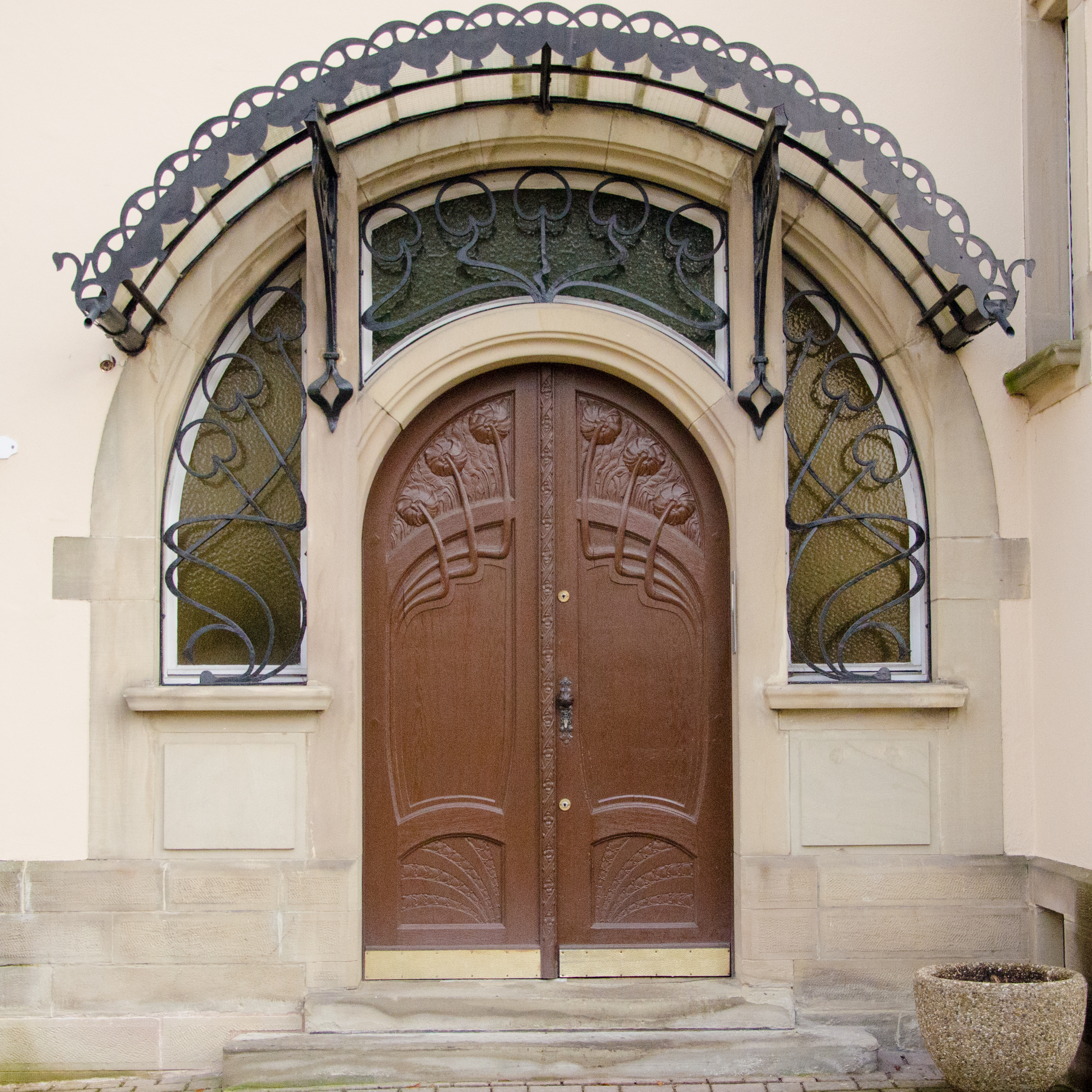
Detail of Villa Stempel (1903)

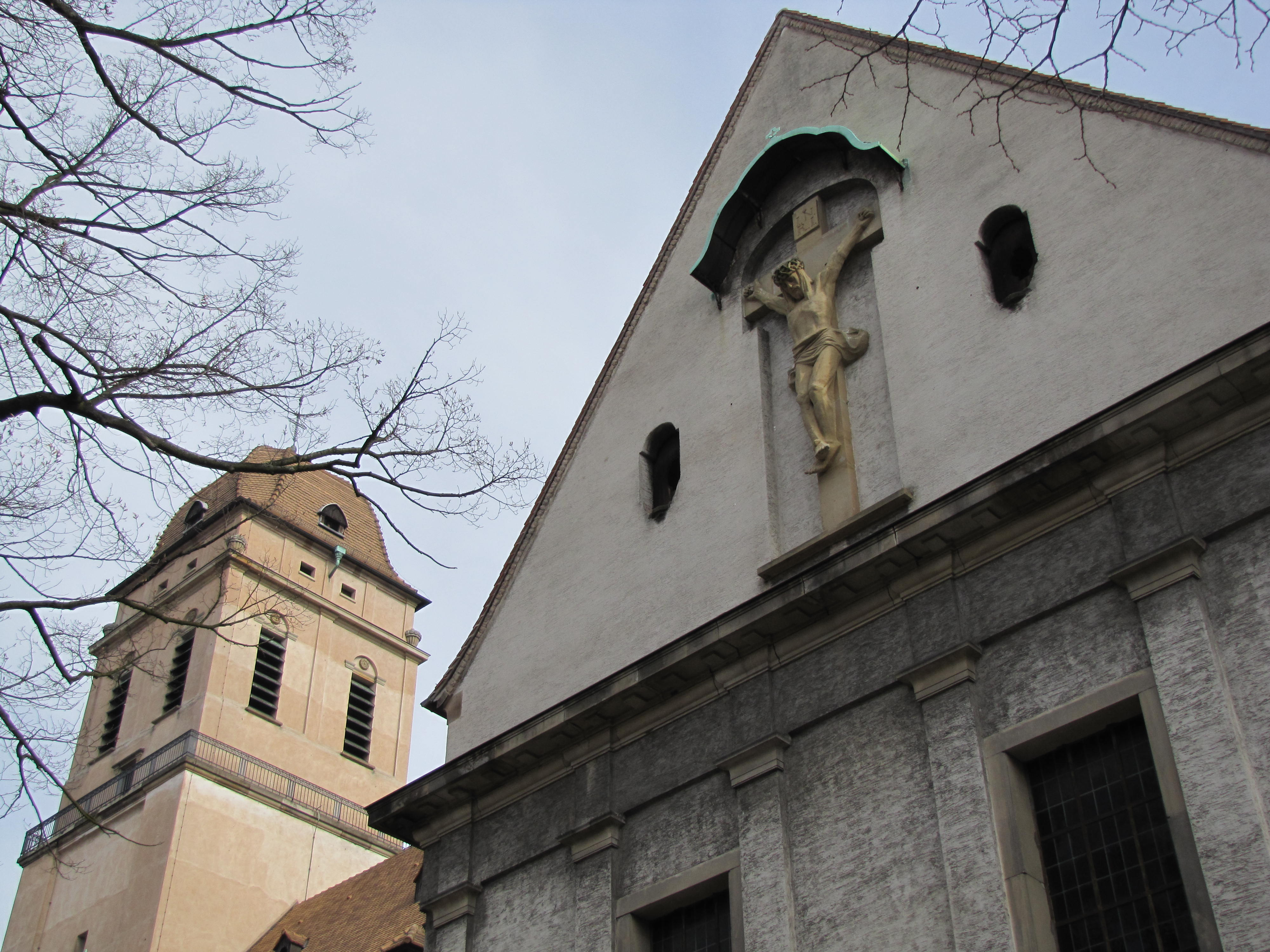
Église Sainte-Madeleine

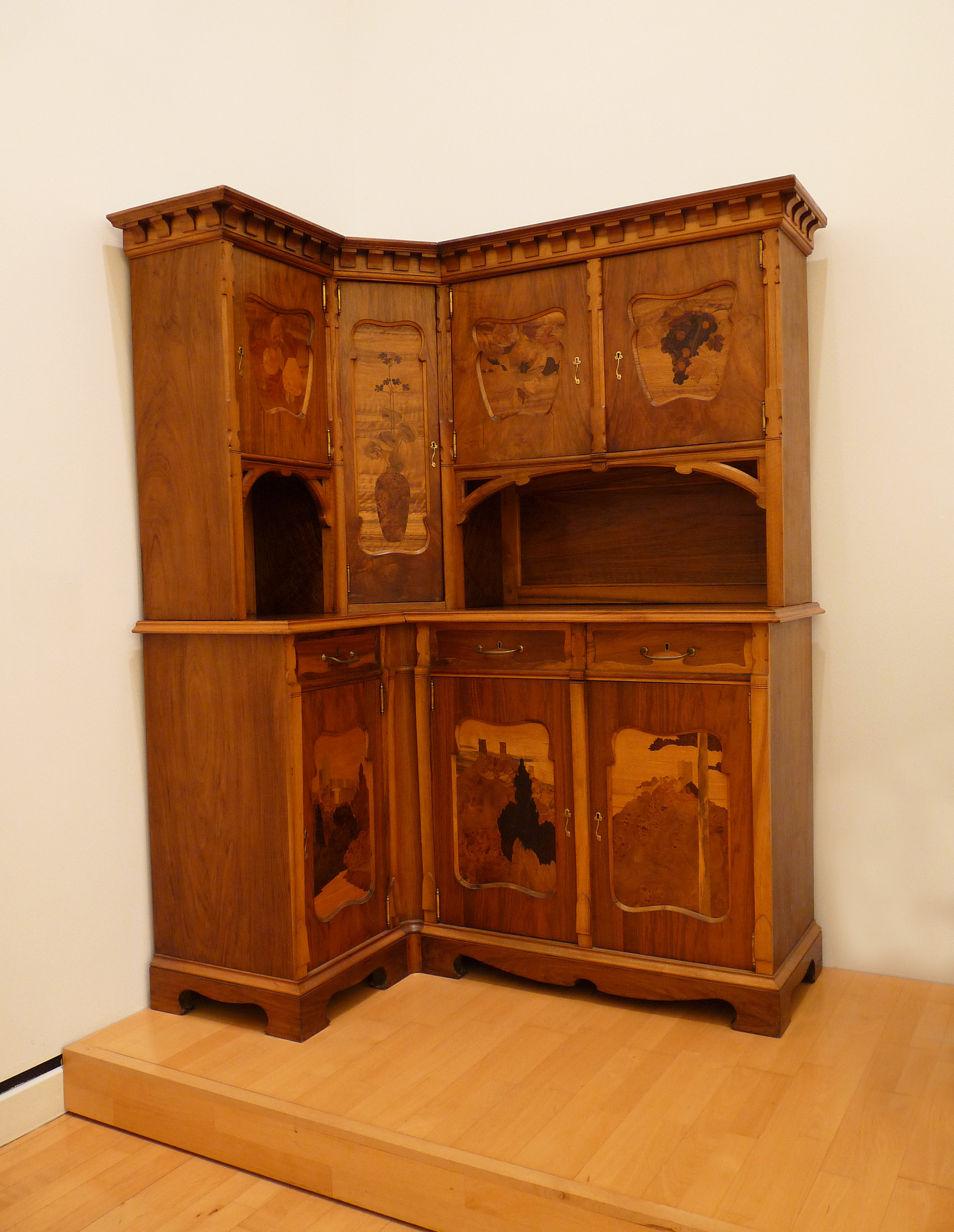
Sideboard by Charles Spindler (MAMCS)

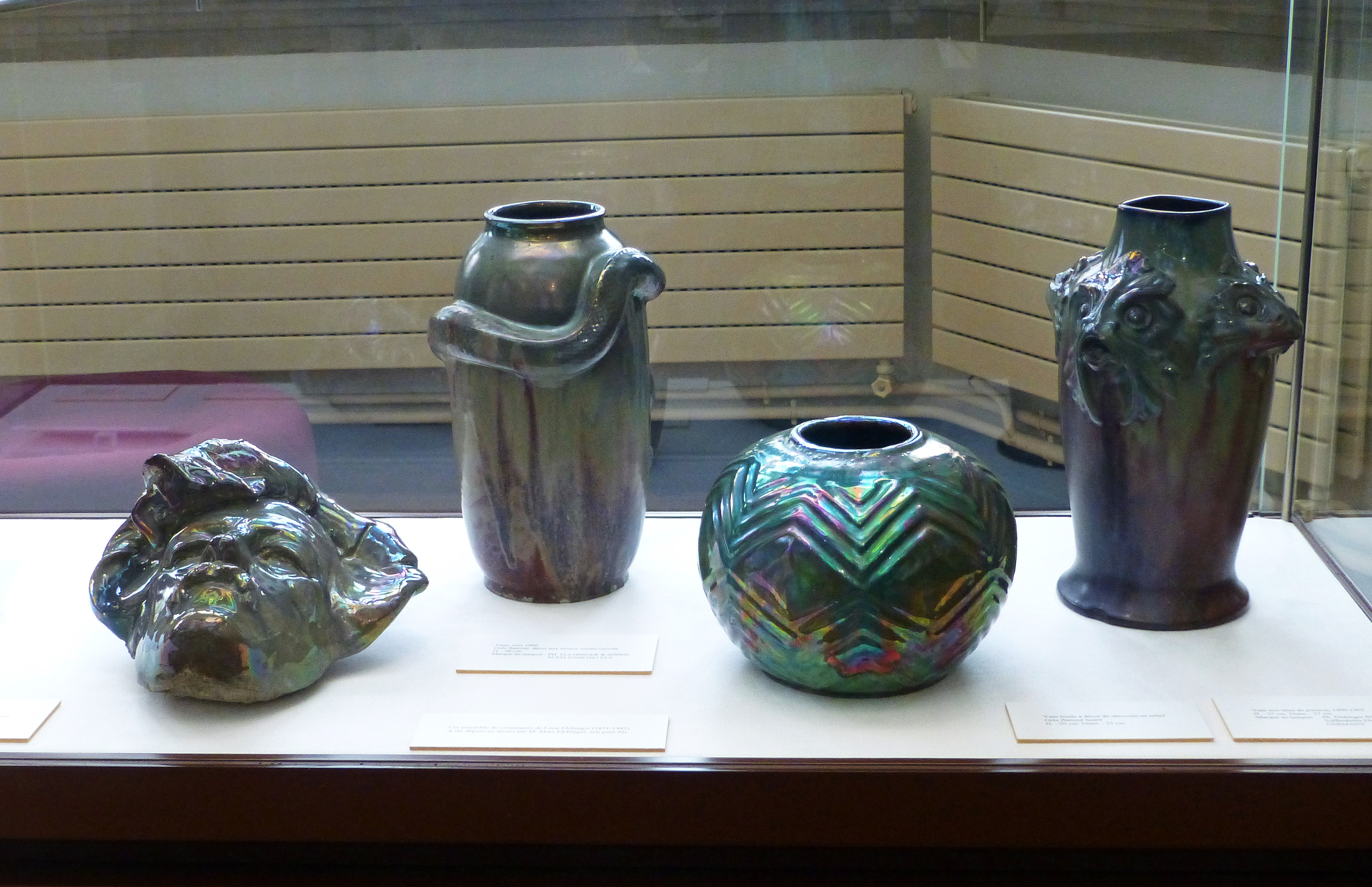
Lustreware by Léon Elchinger (Musée historique de Haguenau)

== Bibliography ==
- Schnitzler, Bernadette (ed.): Strasbourg 1900 – Naissance d’une capitale, Musées de Strasbourg/Somogy Éditions d'art 2000, ISBN 9782850563874
- Befort, Paul-André; Daul, Léon; Kontzler, Chantal; Lery, Pierre: Strasbourg 1900 : Carrefour des arts nouveaux, Éditions Place Stanislas 2010, ISBN 9782355780646
- Doucet, Hervé; Haegel, Olivier; Pottecher, Marie; et al.: La Neustadt de Strasbourg : un laboratoire urbain (1871-1930), Éditions Lieux Dits 2017, ISBN 9782362191510
