= Villa Schutzenberger =

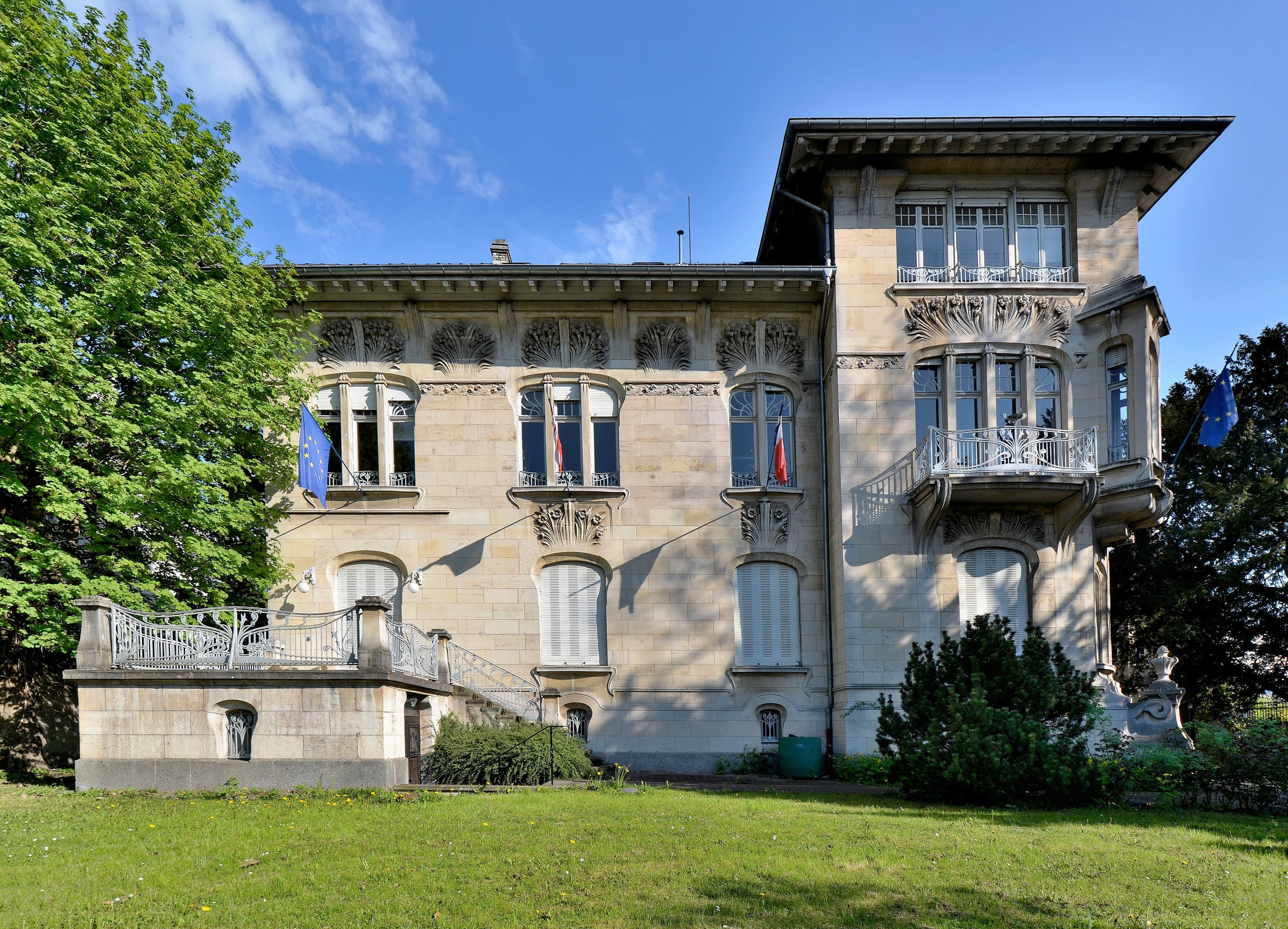
- Villa Schutzenberger in 2019

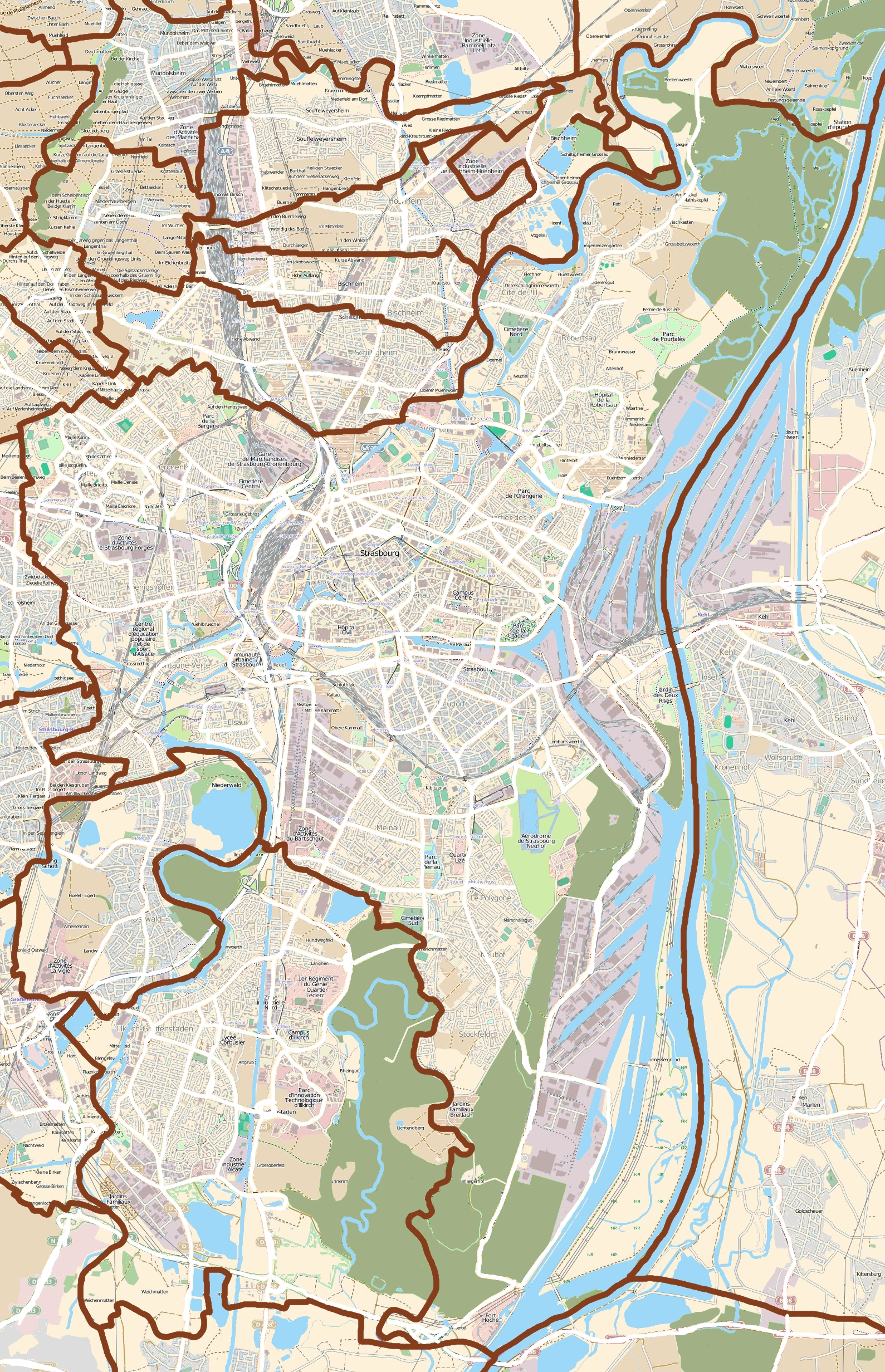
- Location within Strasbourg
- Alternative names: Hôtel Schutzenberger

General information
- Type: private housing
- Architectural style: Art Nouveau
- Location: Strasbourg, France, 76, allée de la Robertsau
- Coordinates: 48°35′30.40″N 7°46′12″E
- Current tenants: European Audiovisual Observatory
- Construction started: 1897
- Completed: 1900
- Owner: Council of Europe

Design and construction
- Architects: Jules Berninger, Gustave Krafft

The Villa Schutzenberger, also known as the Hôtel Schutzenberger (German: Schützenberger) is an Art Nouveau hôtel particulier on the Allée de la Robertsau in the Neustadt district of Strasbourg, in the French department of the Bas-Rhin. It has been classified as a monument historique since 1975. The Villa has been the seat of the European Audiovisual Observatory since 1992.

== History ==
This ample villa was built for the owner of the Schutzenberger brewery (Brasserie Schutzenberger), Louis-Oscar Schützenberger (1866–1943), by Jules (German: Julius) Berninger and his brother in law, Gustave (Gustav) Krafft, two prolific local architects who often worked together between 1895 and 1905.

Work on the villa started in 1897 and it was finished in 1900. Inspired by Italianate architecture in its shape and the design of its garden, it is one of the most lavish and frequently cited examples of Art Nouveau architecture in Strasbourg. In spite of this, due to the financial decline of the Schutzenberger brewery, the villa was sold and threatened with demolition in 1972. It was ultimately saved by the municipality but stood empty until 1978. The ground floor was then rented by the Parliamentary Assembly of the Council of Europe, which became renter of the whole building in 1989. The Villa Schutzenberger has been completely restored since. It is not open for tourists apart on special days such as European Heritage Days.

== Gallery ==
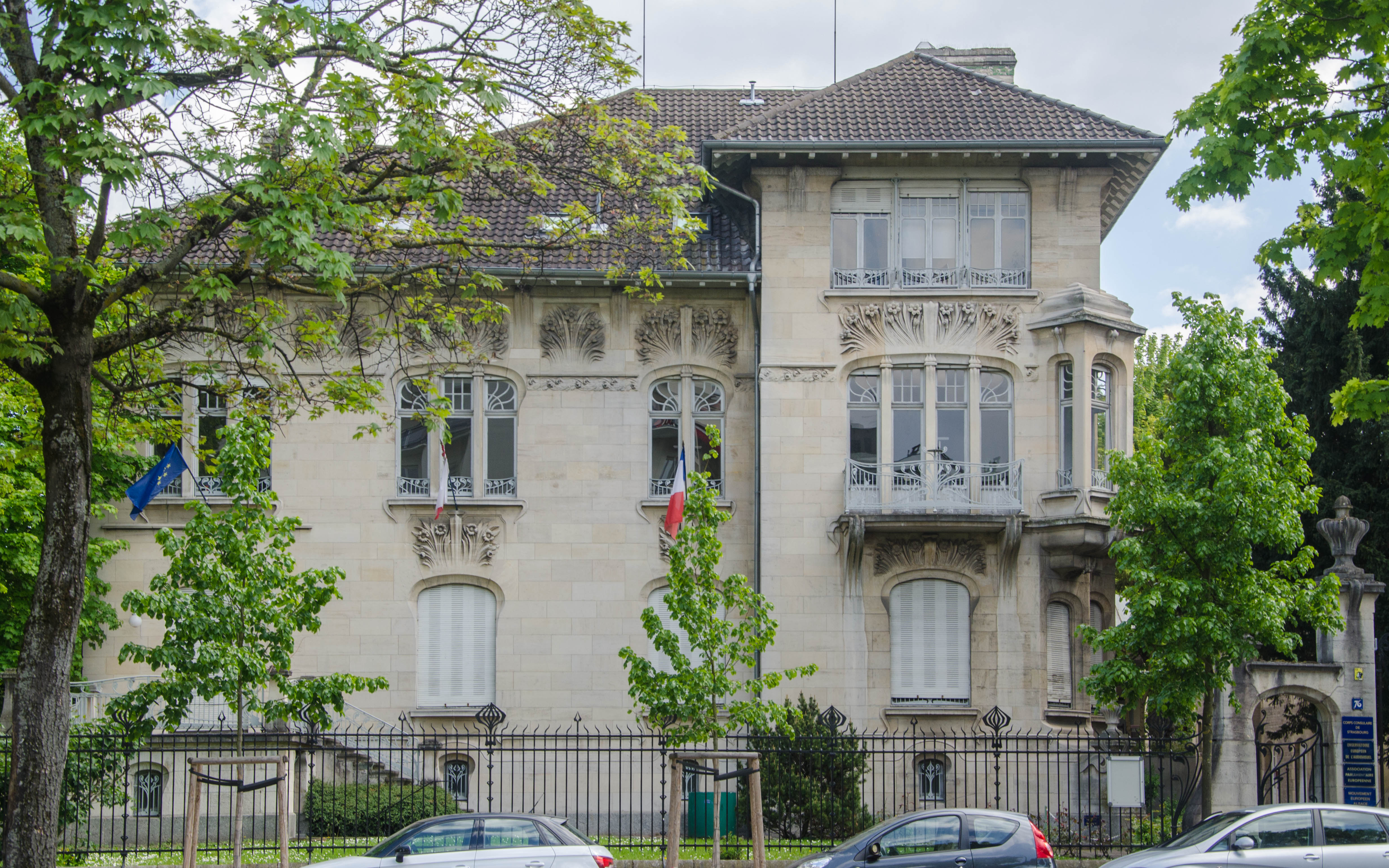
The Villa seen from the street in 2017

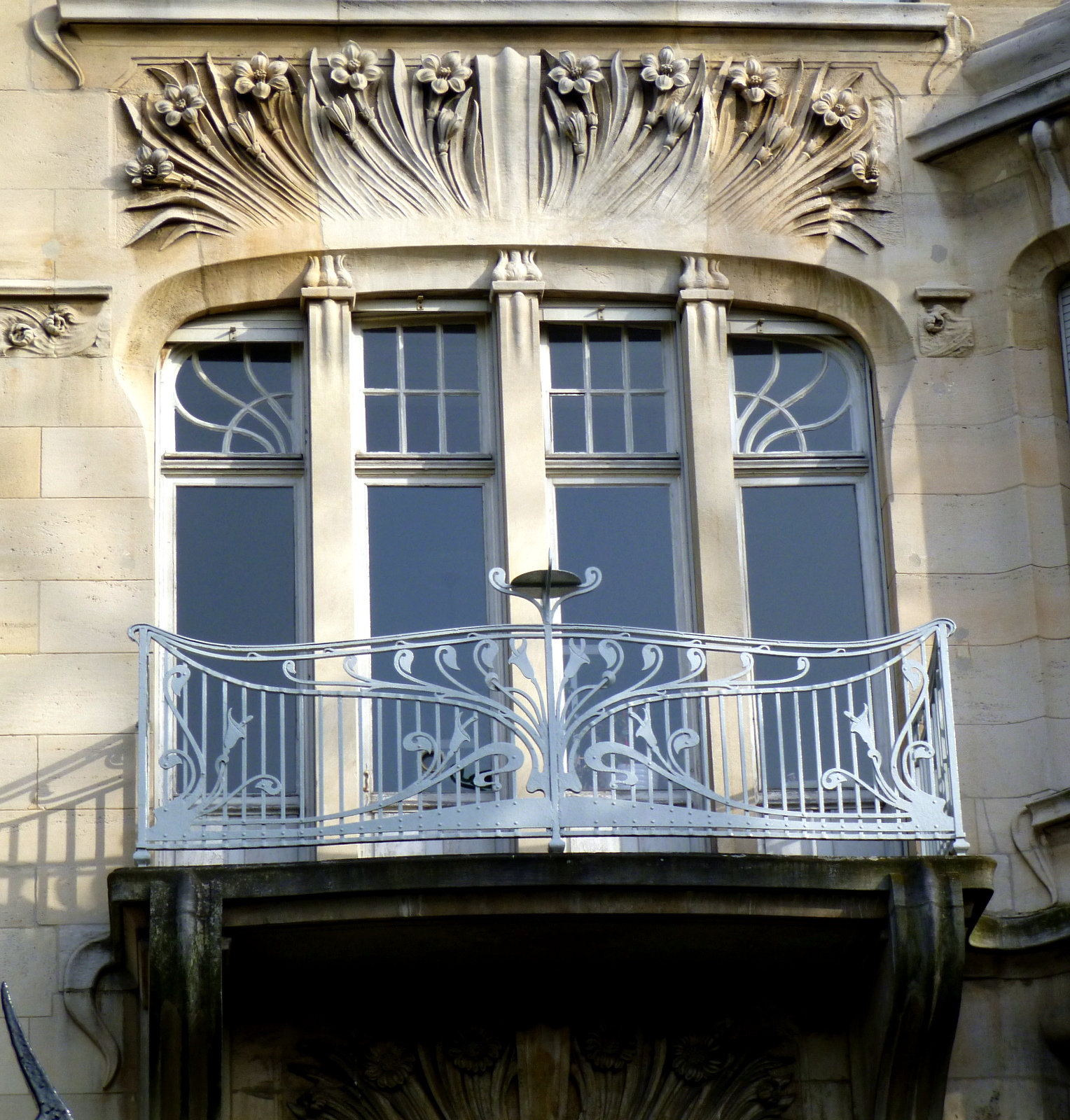
Wrought iron balcony and detail of the façade

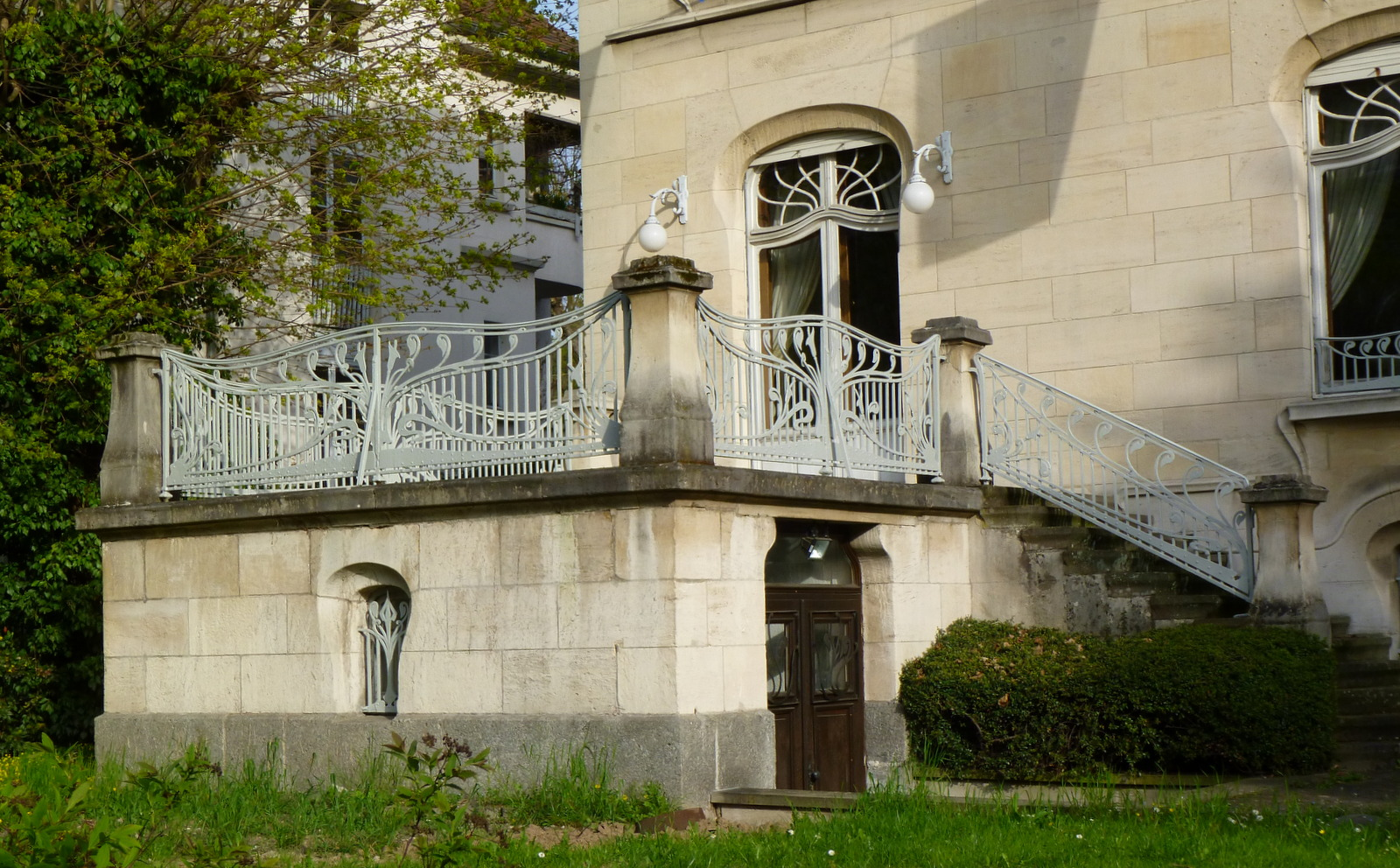
Garden terrace

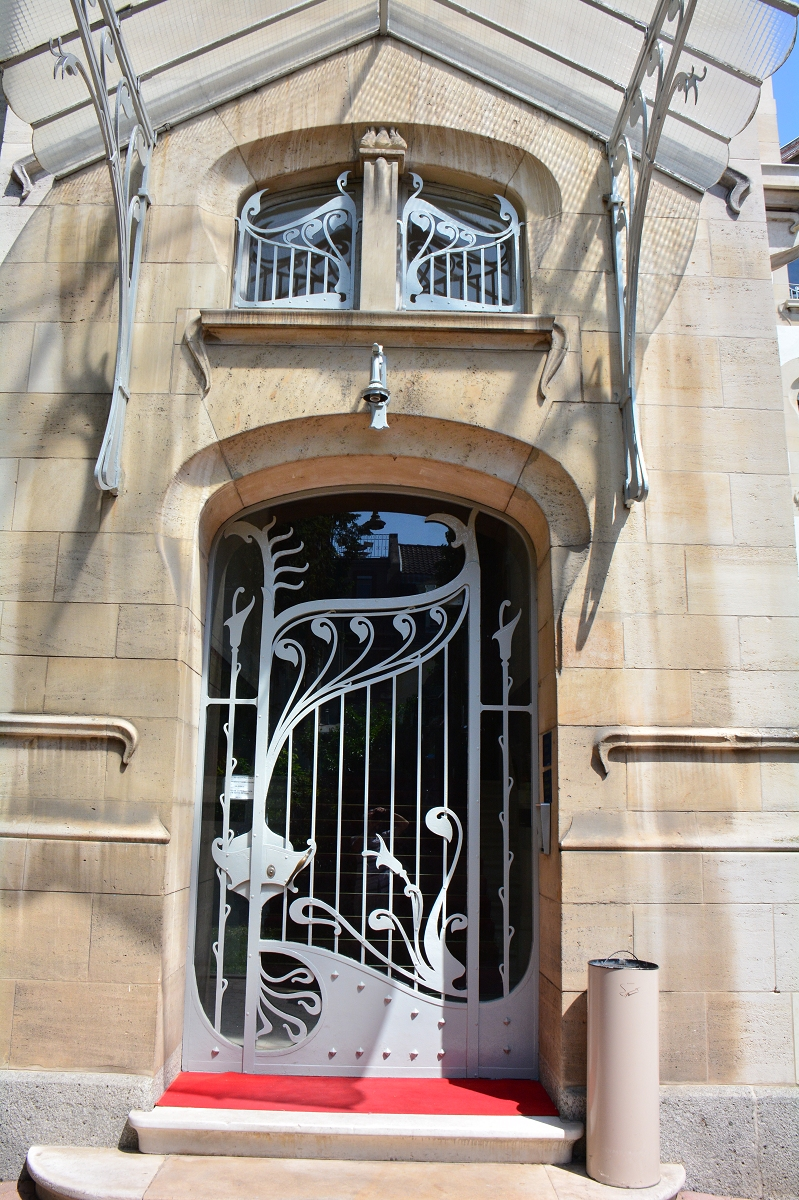
Entrance door in 2015

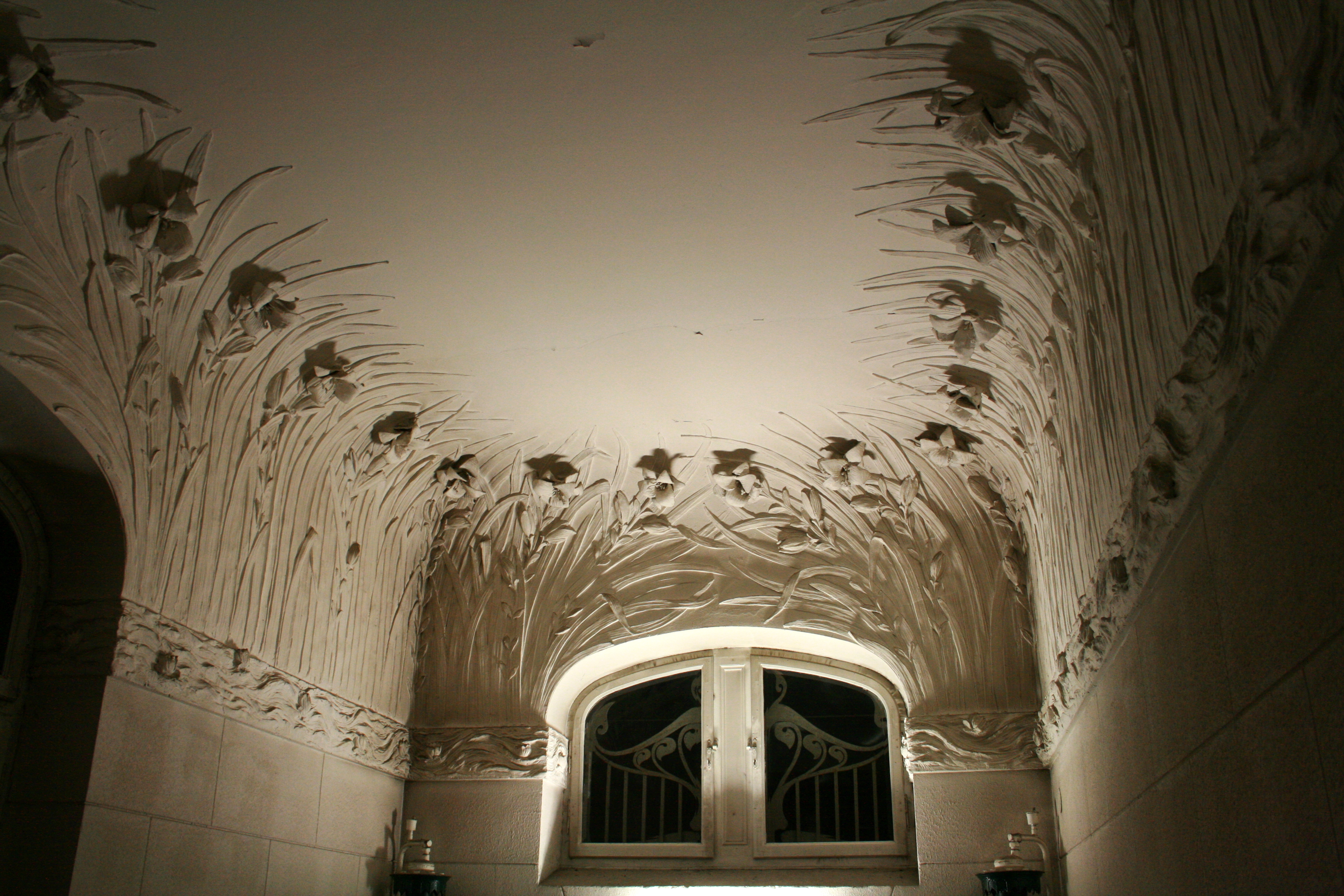
Ceiling of the entrance hall

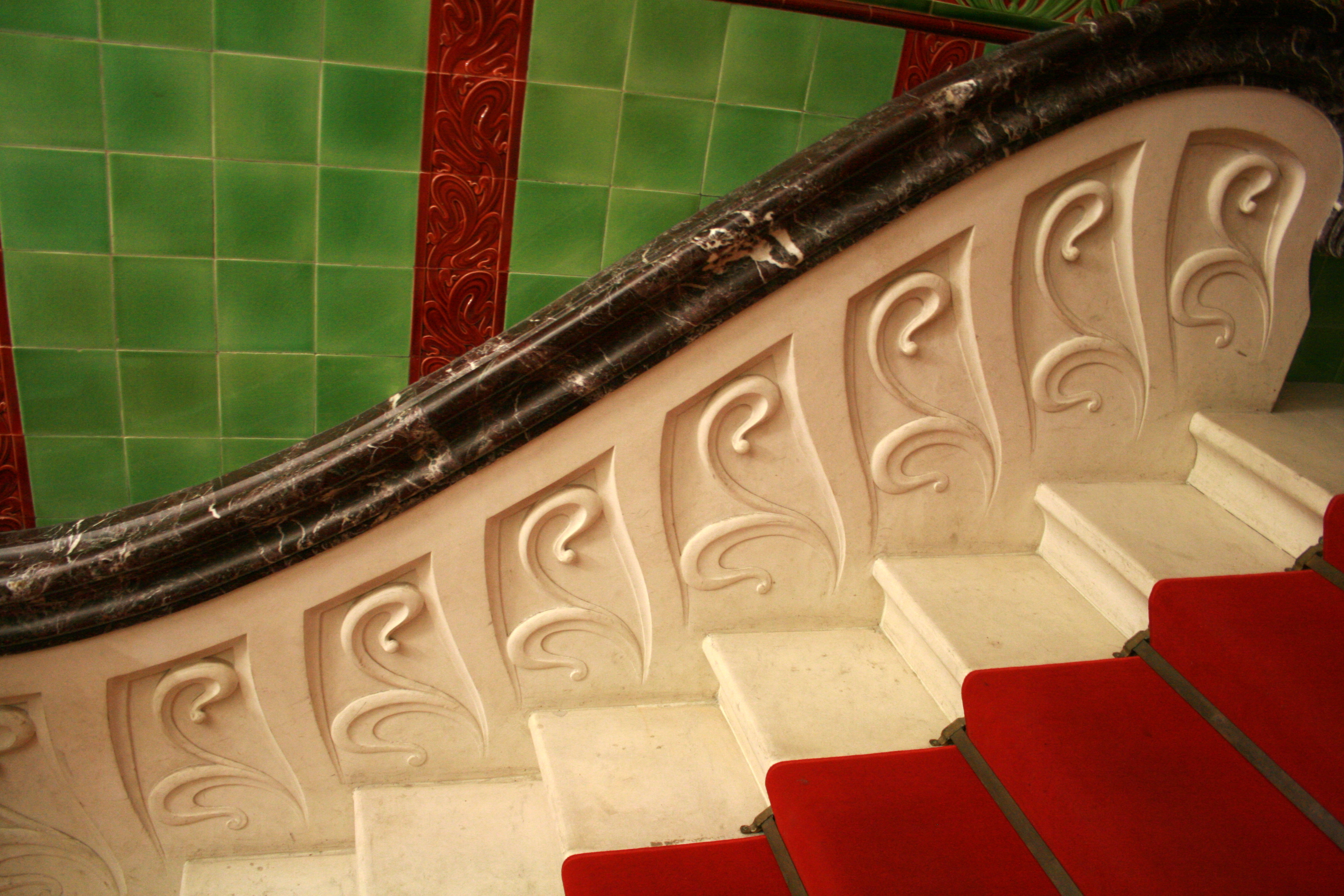
Detail of the stairs

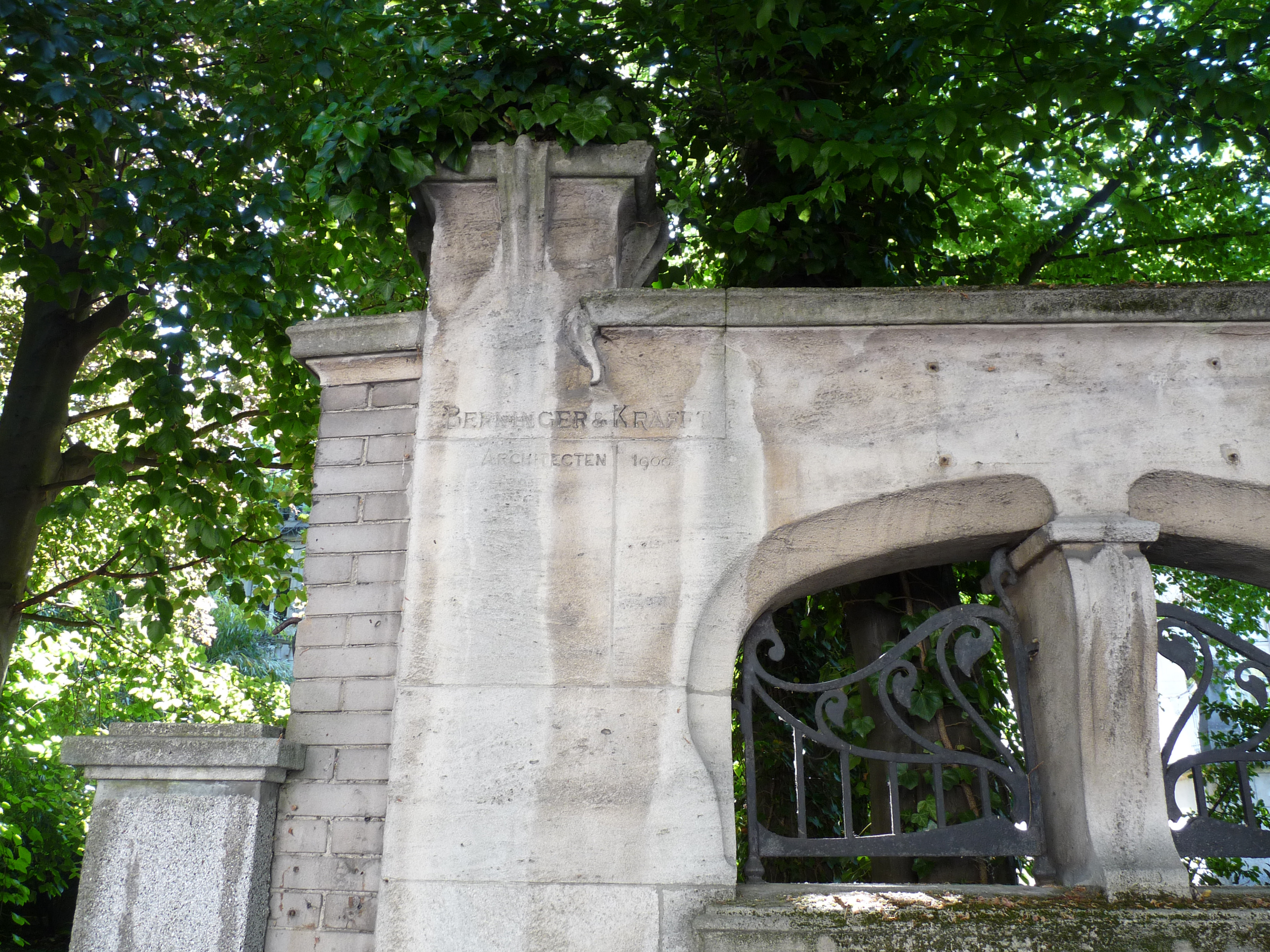
Signature of the architects on the garden wall

== Literature ==
- Recht, Roland; Foessel, Georges; Klein, Jean-Pierre: Connaître Strasbourg, 1988, ISBN 2-7032-0185-0, page 271

== See also ==
- 56, Allée de la Robertsau
- Hôtel Brion
