= European Audiovisual Observatory =

International statistical organization

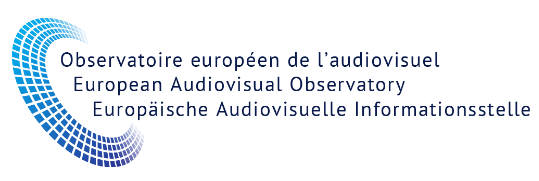
- Logo
- Official languages: English, French, German
- Membership: 42 members (41 countries plus the European Union represented by the European Commission)

Leaders
  - Executive Director: Pauline Durand-Vialle
- Website obs.coe.int

The European Audiovisual Observatory (French: Observatoire européen de l’audiovisuel, German: Europäische Audiovisuelle Informationsstelle) is a public service organisation, part of the Council of Europe set up in 1992 as a partial agreement.

The Observatory collects, analyses and produces data about the audiovisual industries in Europe, such as cinema, television, audiovisual media services (such as streaming services and video sharing platforms) and public policies related to these sectors. The budget of the Observatory is mainly financed by direct contributions from its member states and the European Union represented by the European Commission. Part of its budget is covered by the sale of certain products and services.

The Observatory's headquarters are located in the Villa Schutzenberger in Strasbourg.

== Scope ==
The Observatory collects, processes, and disseminates information about the audiovisual sector in its member states as well as the activities of international organisations. It also periodically monitors developments in other regions of the world.

The information provided by the European Audiovisual Observatory is intended for professionals in the audiovisual industry—including producers, distributors, exhibitors, broadcasters, and other service providers—as well as international organisations, public decision-makers responsible for media, national and European legislators, journalists, researchers, lawyers, investors, consultants, and the academic community.

This information is available in the form of publications, statistical data, financial market analysis and in-depth studies on legal developments. It is made available in the form of various publications and services, many of which are available free of charge: reports, online information, databases, presentations made at conferences or workshops.

The European Audiovisual Observatory has established and manages a European information network from which it collects its information. This network is made up of partner organisations and institutions, companies specialising in the provision of professional information and specialist correspondents.

== Structure ==
The Executive Director of the Observatory is in charge of a multicultural team from different European countries. Structurally the Observatory is divided into two Departments which take care of collecting, processing and producing all the Observatory's information in the form of reports and online databases. The two Departments are: The Department for Market Information and the Department for Legal Information.

== Members and Executive Council ==
The Observatory has 42 members which meet together in its Executive Council. This governing body meets twice a year to greenlight the Observatory's action plan and budget. Its national members come from various national ministries or institutions working in the audiovisual sector. They are made up of 41 countries and the European Union represented by the European Commission.
