= Hôtel Brion =

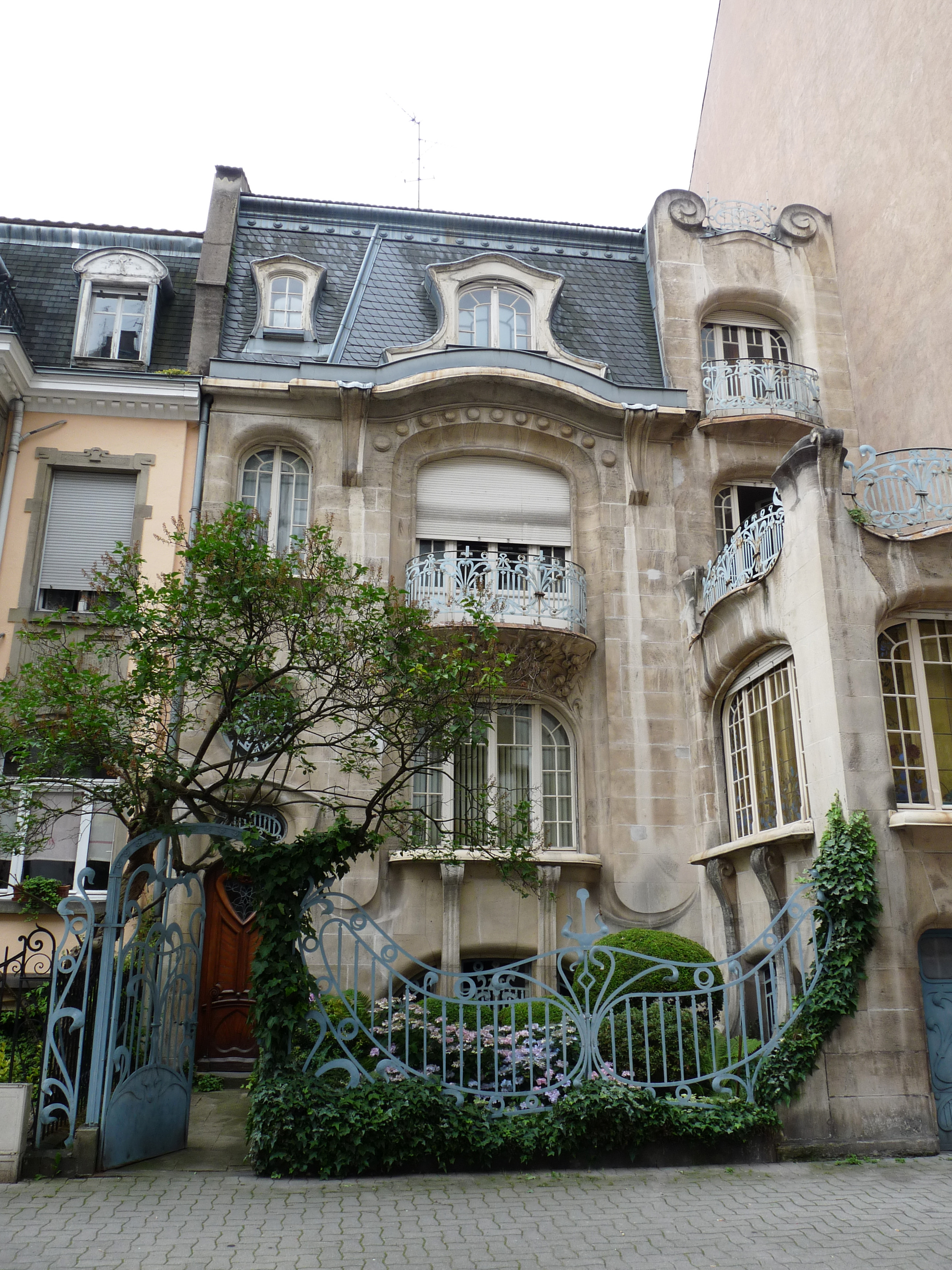
- Hôtel Brion in 2011

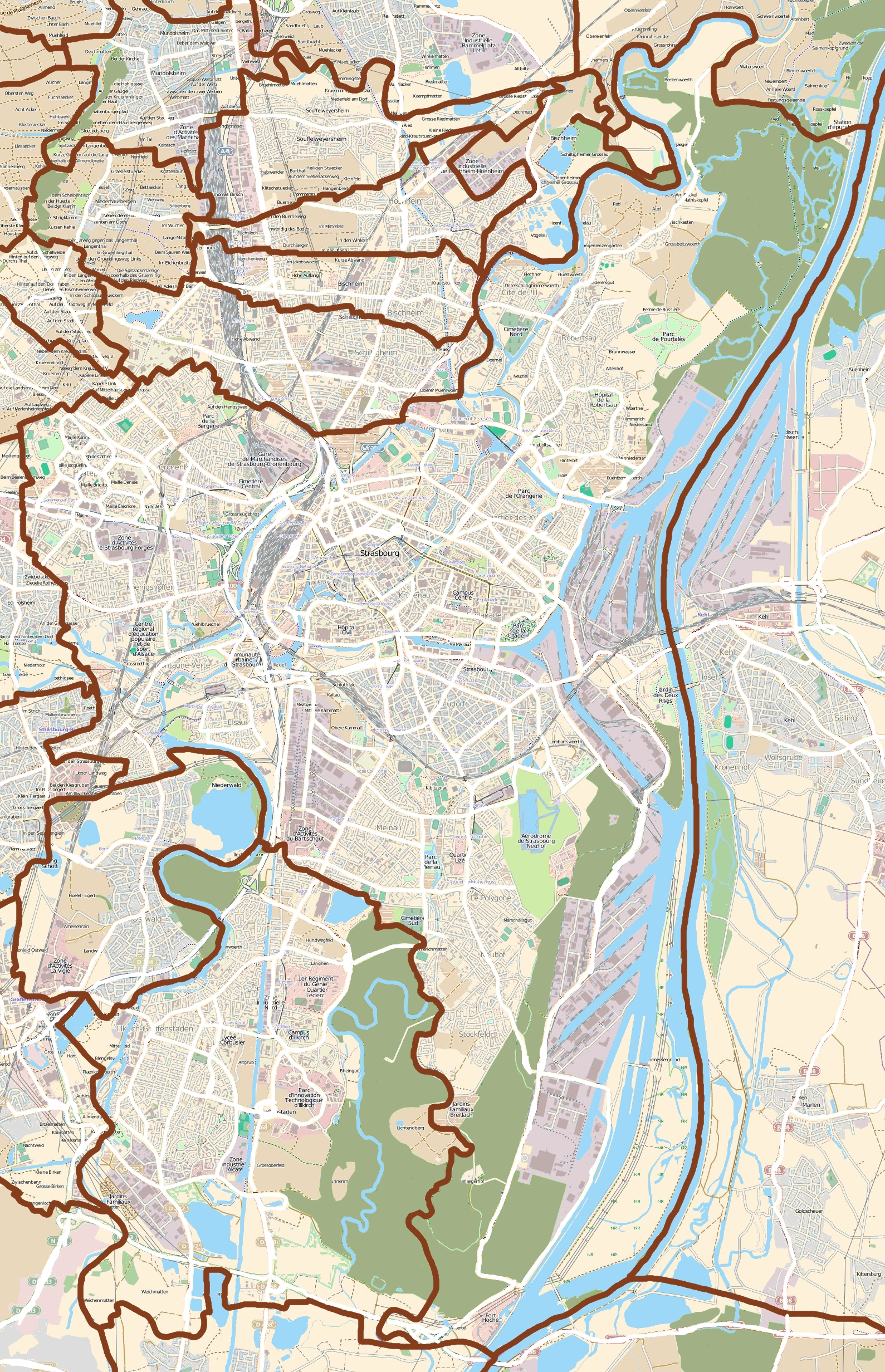
- Location within Strasbourg
- Former names: Hôtel Marguerite
- Alternative names: Villa Brion

General information
- Type: private housing
- Architectural style: Art Nouveau
- Location: Strasbourg, France
- Coordinates: 48°35′08.56″N 7°46′05.47″E
- Completed: 1904

Design and construction
- Architect: Auguste Brion

The Hôtel Brion, also known as the Villa Brion, is a small Art Nouveau hôtel particulier on the Rue Sleidan in the Neustadt district of Strasbourg, in the French department of the Bas-Rhin. It has been classified as a monument historique since 1975.

== History ==
The hôtel particulier was built by the architect Auguste Brion (1861–1940) for himself in 1904. Brion, the scion of a family of artists directly related to the legendary Friederike Brion, was a prolific architect who built four other houses on the same street between 1903 and 1905. The hôtel was executed in a more exuberant style than most of Brion's other works. For the structure, the architect used timber framing and reinforced concrete walls, the surface of which he then covered with stonemasonry. Between 1926 and 1972, the Hôtel Brion was used as a hotel under the name Hôtel Marguerite. It has been in private ownership again since 1980.

== Gallery ==
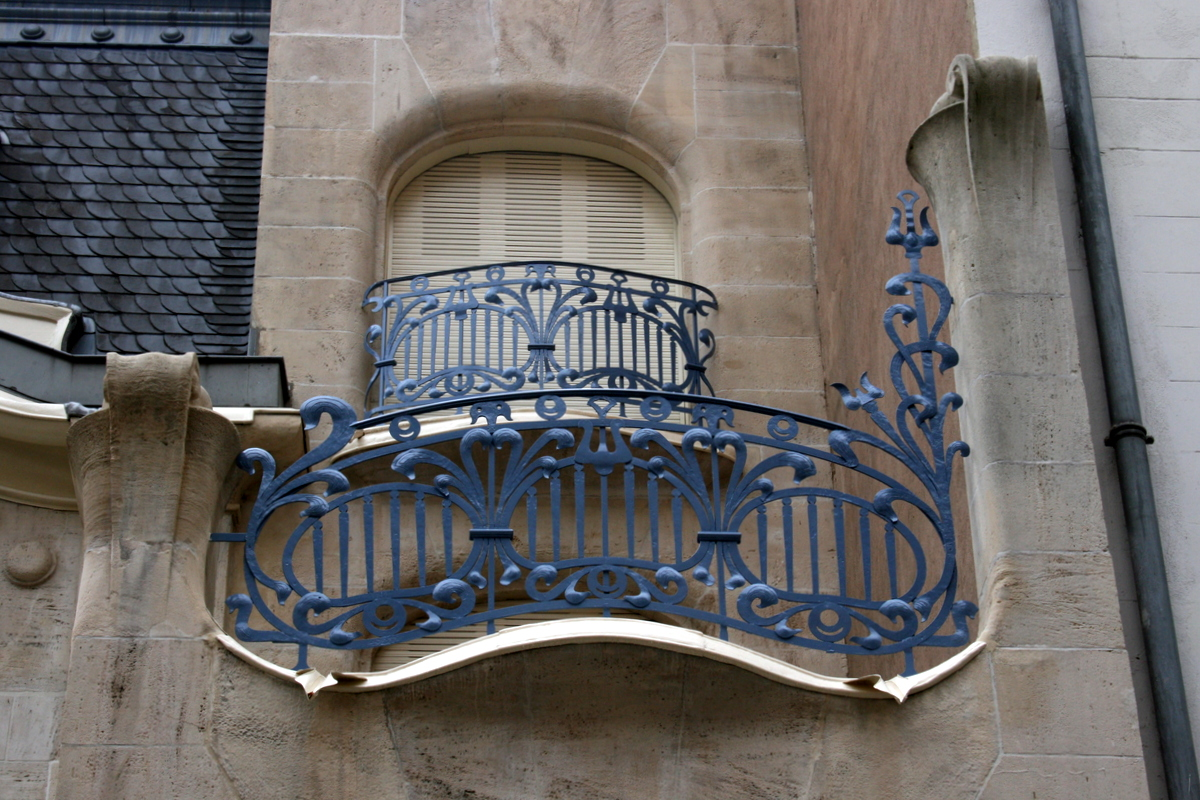
Wrought iron balcony

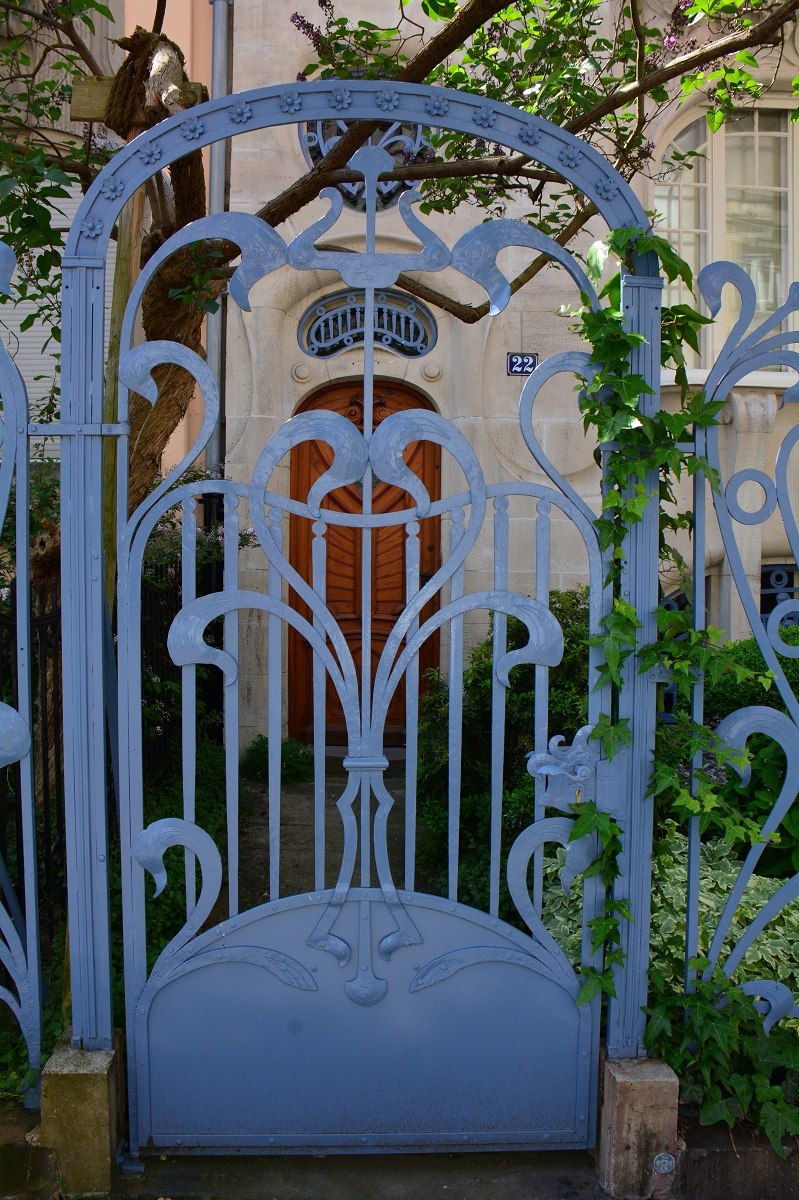
Garden gate

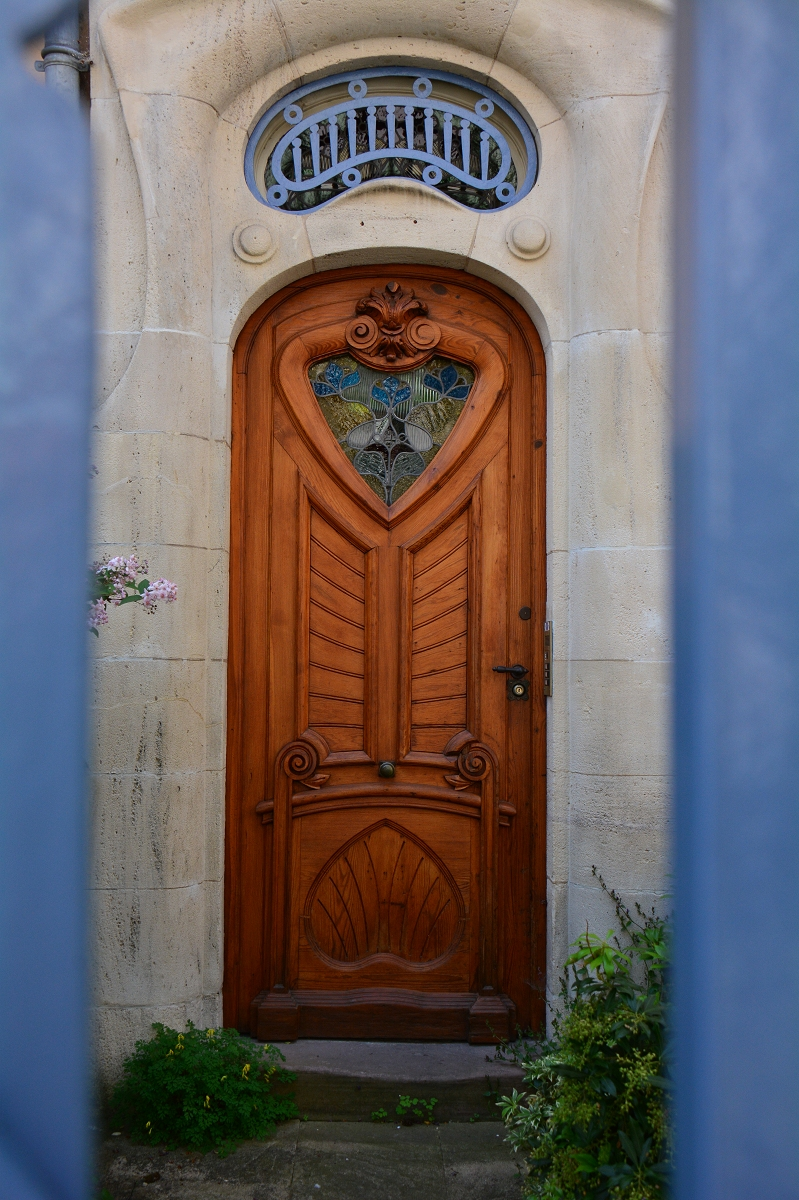
Entrance door

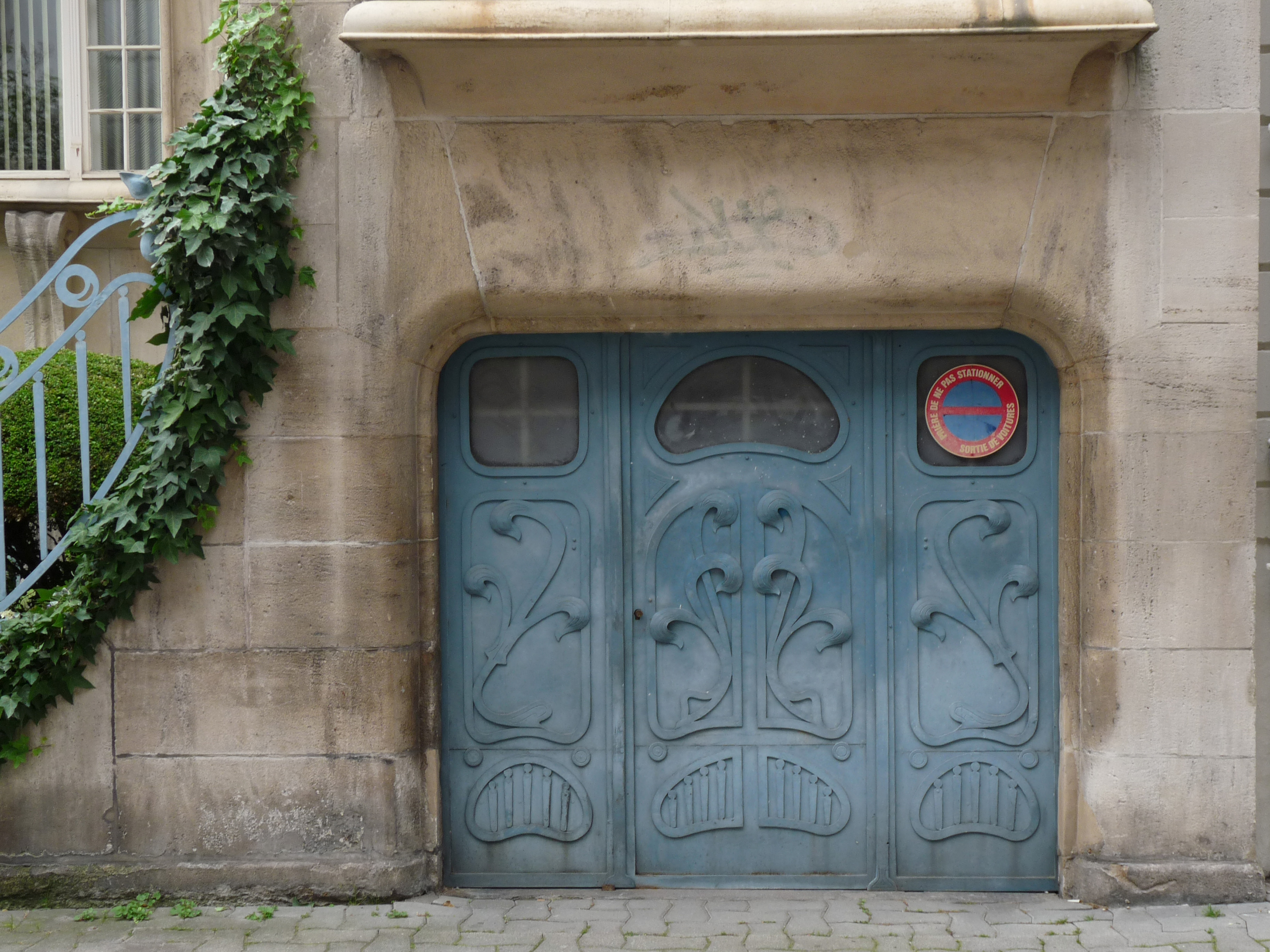
Garage door

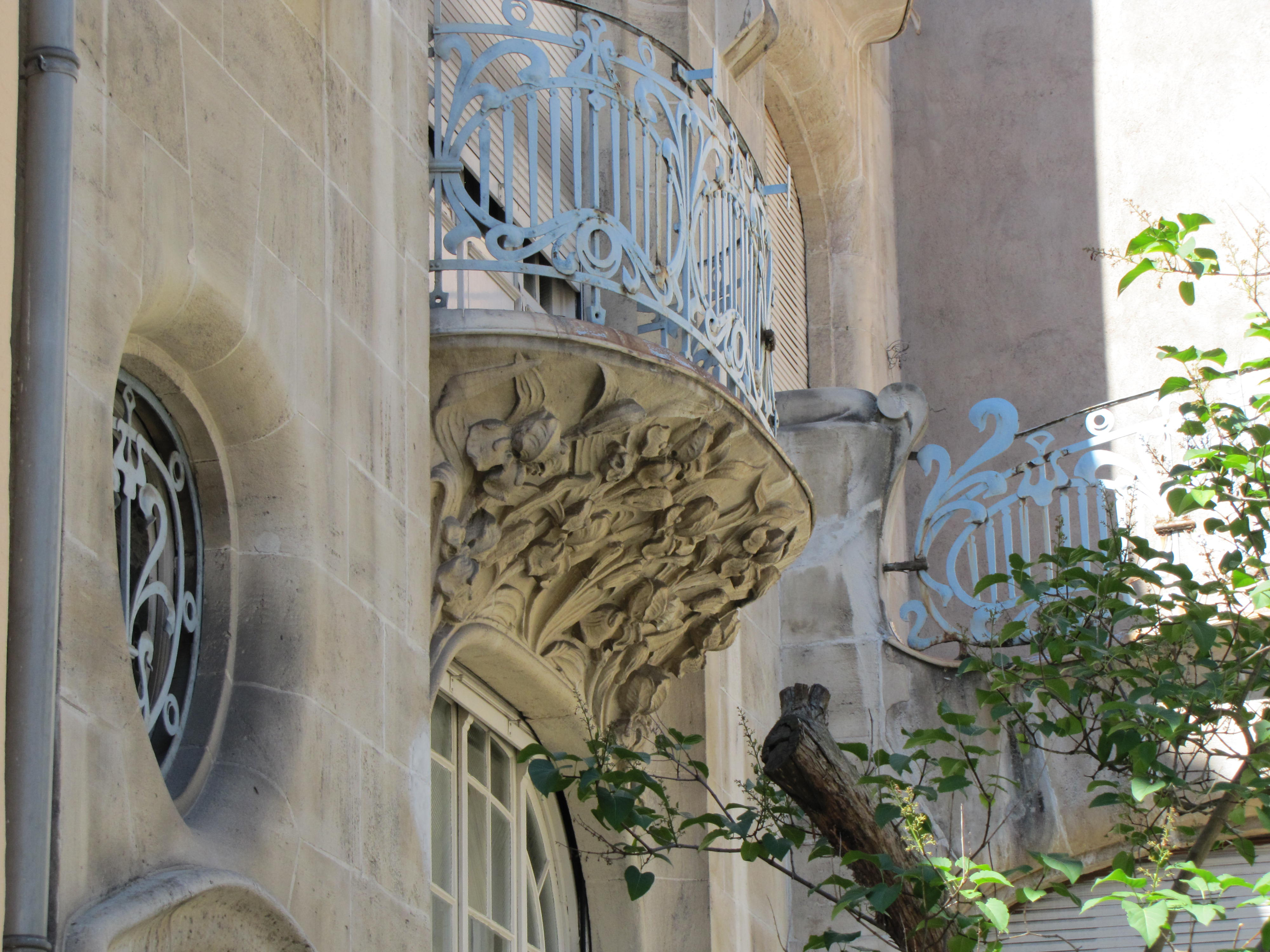
Side view of the façade

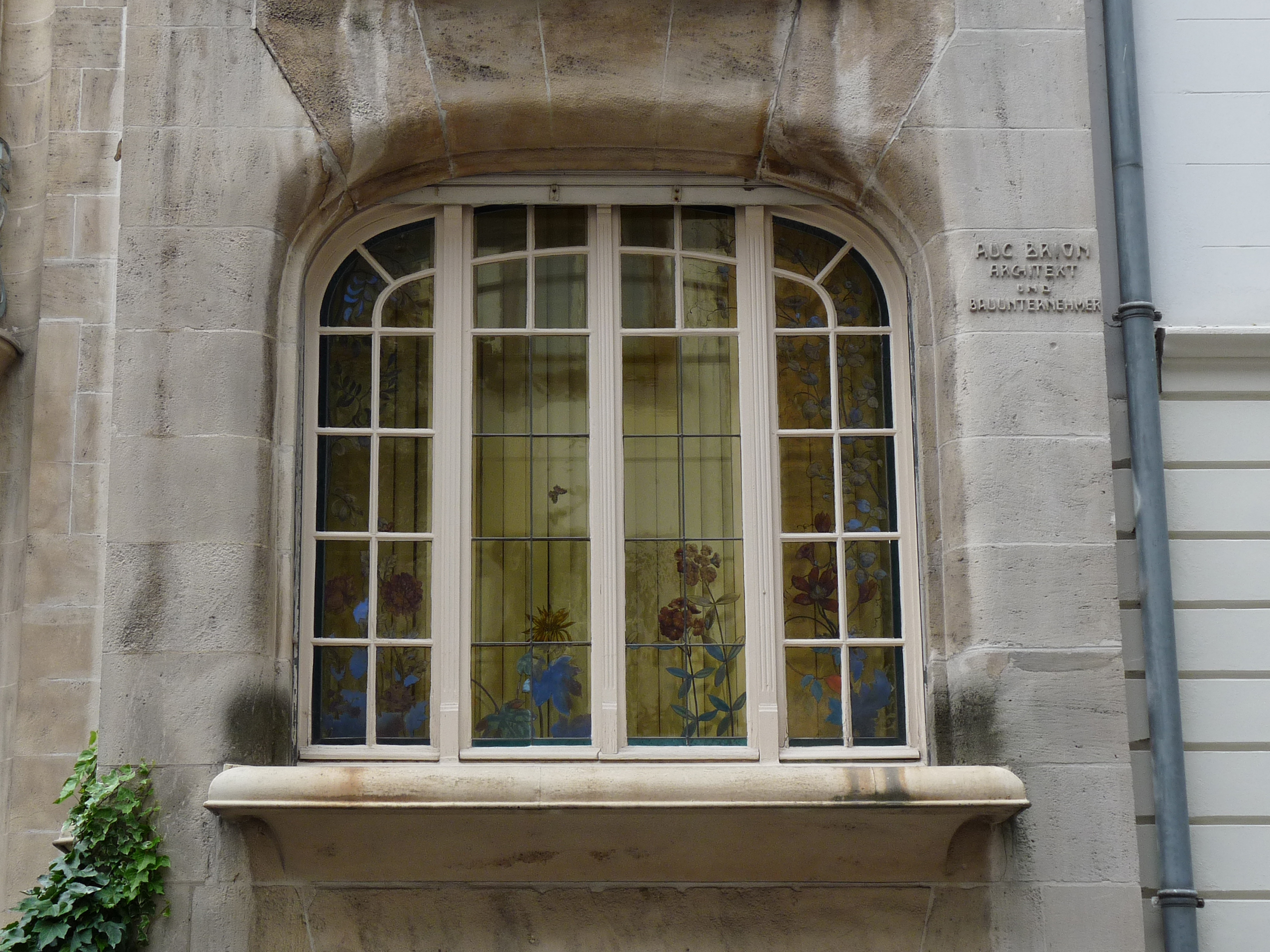
Stained glass window and signature of the architect

== Literature ==
- Recht, Roland; Foessel, Georges; Klein, Jean-Pierre: Connaître Strasbourg, 1988, ISBN 2-7032-0185-0, page 272

== See also ==
- Villa Schutzenberger
