= Neustadt, Strasbourg =

District of Strasbourg, Bas-Rhin in France

Coordinates: 48.5872°N 7.7538°E

UNESCO World Heritage Site
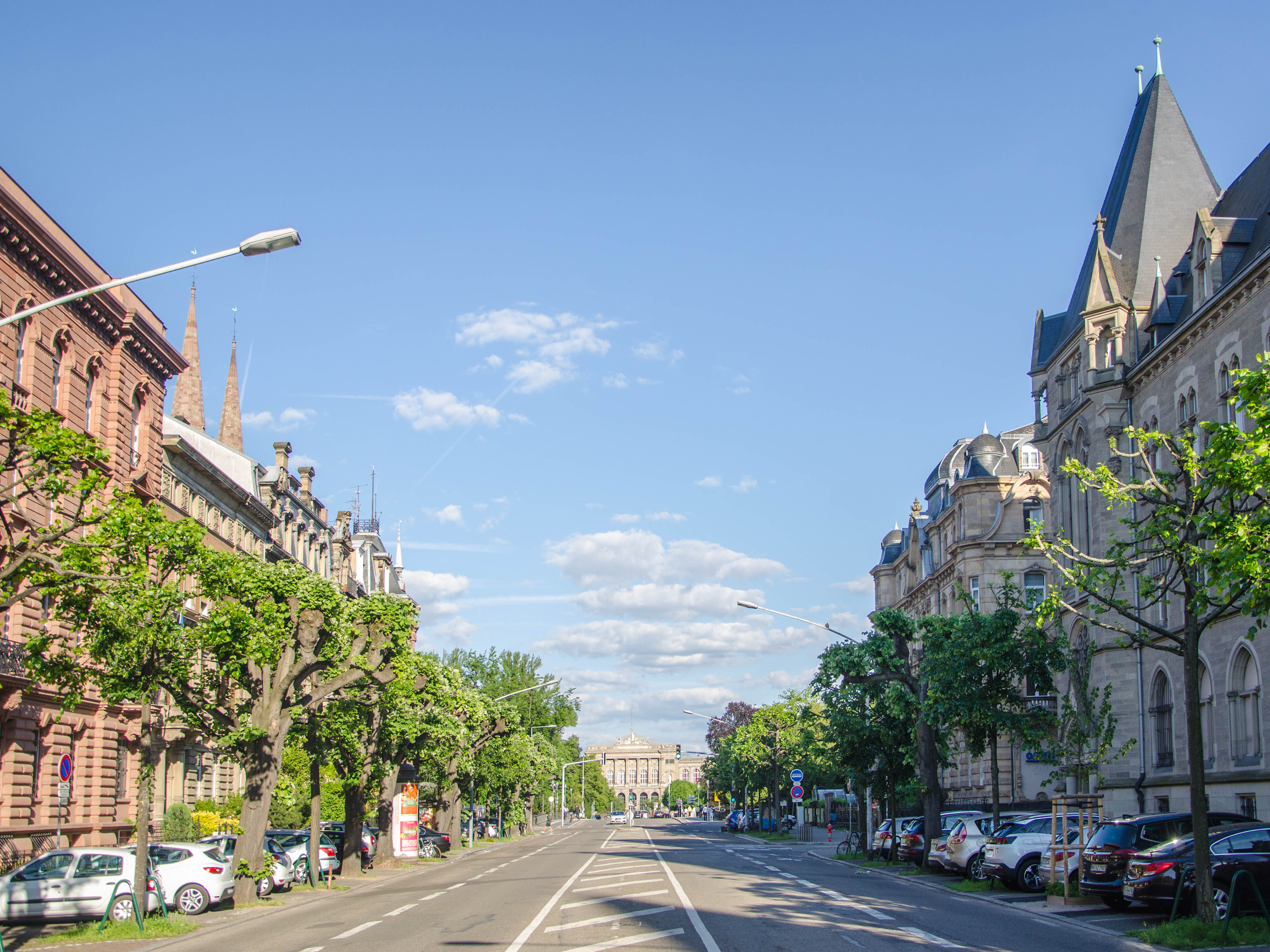
- Avenue de la Liberté
- Location: Strasbourg, Bas-Rhin, Grand Est, France
- Part of: Strasbourg, Grand-Île and Neustadt
- Criteria: Cultural: (i), (ii), (iv)
- Reference: 495bis
- Inscription: 2017 (41st Session)

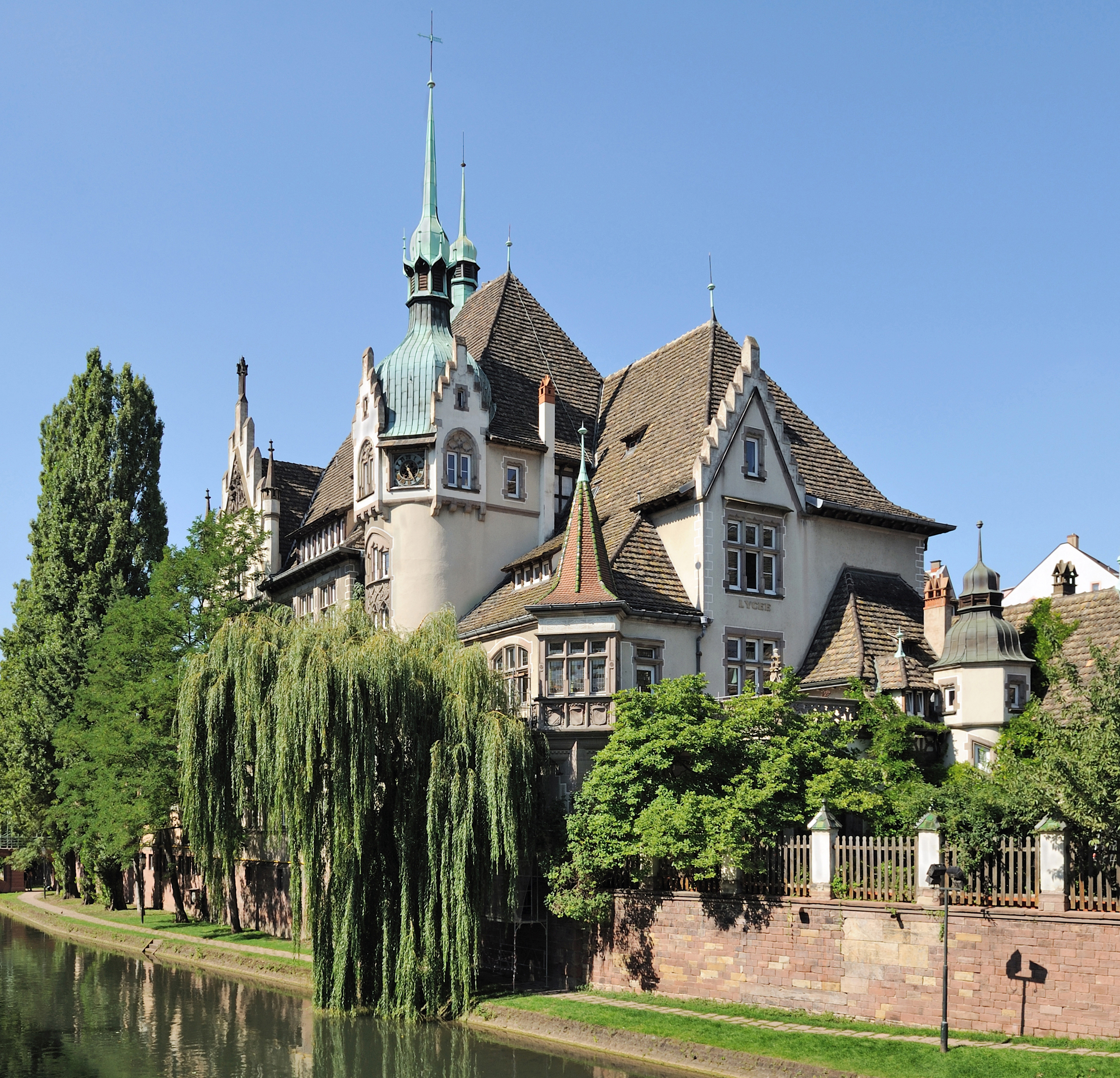
Lycée des Pontonniers

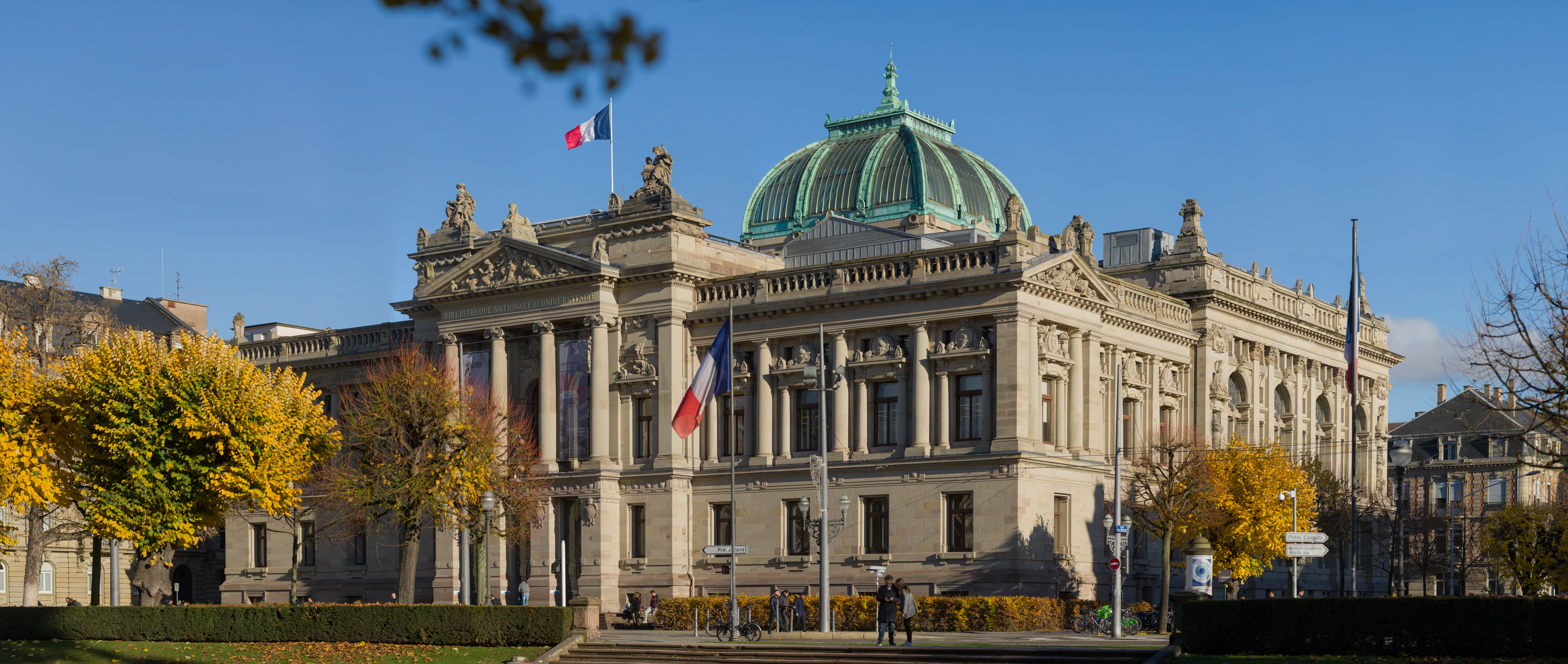
National and University Library on Place de la République

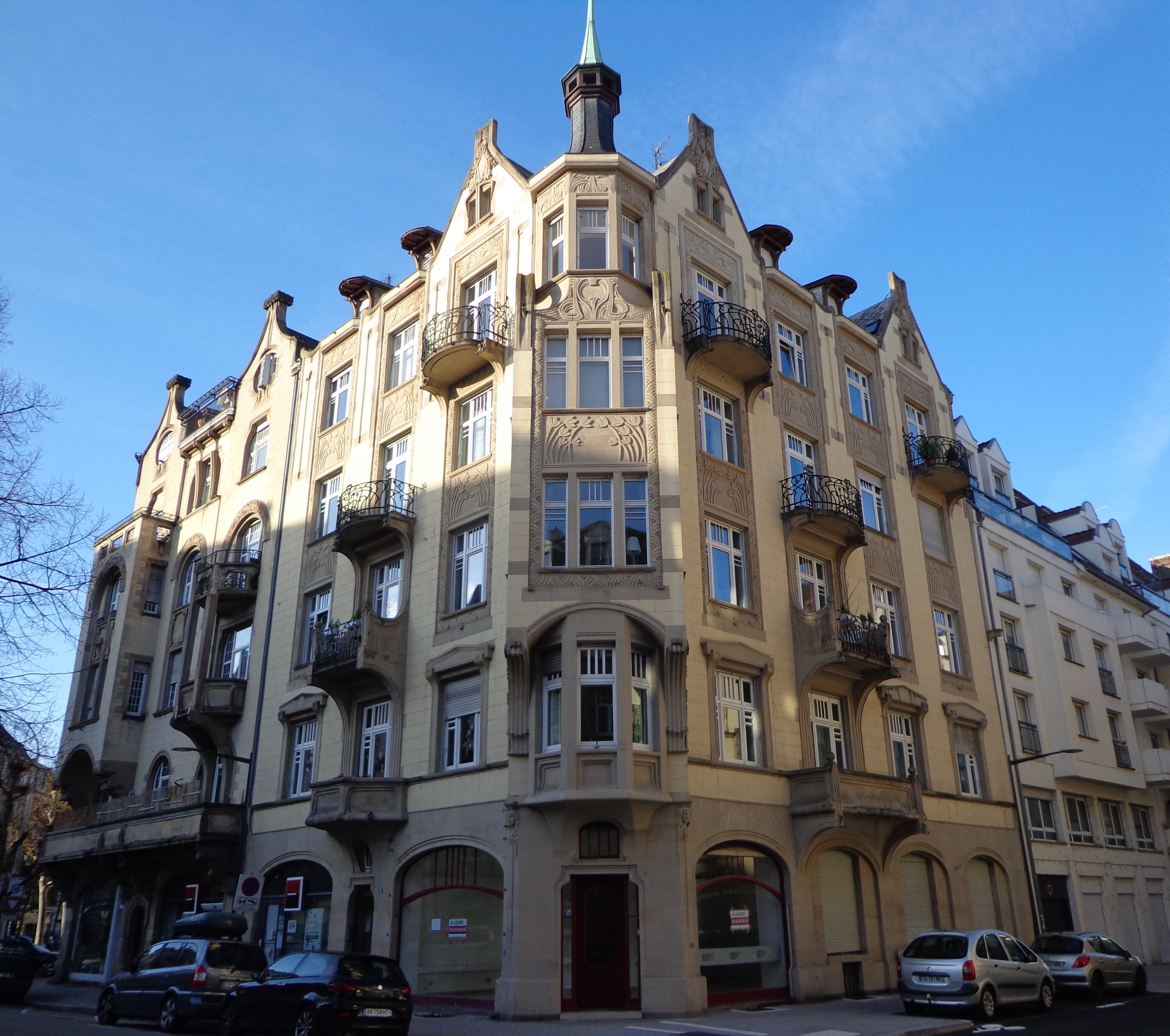
Art Nouveau houses on Rue Sellénick

The Neustadt (German for New Town) is a district of Strasbourg, Bas-Rhin, France. In 2017, the heart of the district was listed as a World Heritage Site by UNESCO, as an extension of the site including the older city centre (Grande Île) and Strasbourg Cathedral. The district is a unique example of city planning, merging the Haussmannian model with elements of German architecture and urban planning.

Aside from the Imperial Quarter of Metz, the Neustadt district of Strasbourg contains the most complete and best-preserved examples of urbanism under the German Empire. In Germany itself, the comparable districts of such cities often suffered the bombardment by Allied forces in the Second World War.

== History and description ==
The Neustadt district was created by the Germans during the Reichsland period (1871–1918) to serve as a new city center. As opposed to the old town on the Grande Île, which in 1871 had more narrow and crooked streets and fewer squares than today, the new town was conceived along monumental boulevards and broad, rectilinear streets that were seen as modern, healthy and easy to police. In order to gain the necessary space, several belts of fortifications, mostly dating from the years 1519–1552, and 1630–1681, were torn down; remains of these are found with each archaeological excavation in the area. Many architectural styles were used for the construction of the Neustadt, mostly on a grand scale: Baroque Revival, Renaissance Revival, Gothic Revival, Romanesque Revival, often a mixture of several or all of these styles (Historicism). At the end of the 19th century, at the same time as a new building material, reinforced concrete, a new and better defined style appeared as well: Art Nouveau.

The Neustadt comprises a number of public buildings and monuments that are today classified as Monuments historiques, such as:

- Palais du Rhin, former palace of the German Emperors
- University Palace (also the observatory, the zoological museum, the botanical garden etc.)
- National and University Library
- National Theatre of Strasbourg, the former Parliament building of Alsace-Lorraine
- Palais de Justice
- Palais des Fêtes
- St Paul's Church
- Strasbourg railway station
- Hôtel Brion
- Villa Schutzenberger
- 22, Rue du Général de Castelnau
- 56, Allée de la Robertsau

and also landmarks that are not classified as Monuments historiques (as of 2019), such as the Saint-Pierre-le-Jeune Catholic Church.

== Notable architects ==
- Fritz Beblo
- Berninger & Krafft
- Jean Geoffroy Conrath
- Hermann Eggert
- August Hartel
- Johann Eduard Jacobsthal
- Ludwig Levy
- Lütke & Backes
- Skjold Neckelmann
- August Orth
- Otto Warth

== Literature ==
- Recht, Roland; Foessel, Georges; Klein, Jean-Pierre: Connaître Strasbourg, 1988, ISBN 2-7032-0185-0, pages 253–272
- Bengel, Sabine; Jordan, Benoît; Nohlen, Klaus; Werlé, Maxime et al.: Strasbourg, de la Grande Île à la Neustadt, un patrimoine urbain exceptionnel, 2013, ISBN 9782362190797
- Rapetti, Rodolphe; Schnitzler, Bernadette; et al.: Strasbourg 1900, naissance d'une capitale, 2000, ISBN 9782850563874
- Befort, Paul-André; Daul Léon; Kontzler Chantal; Lery Pierre: Strasbourg 1900, carrefour des arts nouveaux, 2010, ISBN 9782355780646
- Doucet, Hervé; Haegel, Olivier; Pottecher, Marie; et al.: La Neustadt de Strasbourg : un laboratoire urbain (1871-1930), 2017, ISBN 9782362191510
