= Lining Time =

English post-punk band

- Origin: Plymouth, England
- Genres: Post-punk
- Years active: 1982
- Past members: Claire Bushe; Cathy Frost; Lisa Halse; Cathy Josefowitz; Mara de Wit

Lining Time was a British post-punk band.

Swiss-raised Cathy Josefowitz and Holland-born Mara de Wit met Claire Bushe, Cathy Frost, and Lisa Halse as dance students at Dartington College of Arts. The group soon formed Lining Time to use music as a creative expression for their stories.

The band recorded a single album, Strike, which was rediscovered and re-released in 2022.

After the band dissolved in 1982, Josefowitz went on to have an international career as a visual artist.

== Discography ==
- Strike
