= Saint-Pierre-le-Jeune Catholic Church =

Coordinates: 48°35′18″N 7°44′56″E

- Église Saint Pierre-le-Jeune catholique
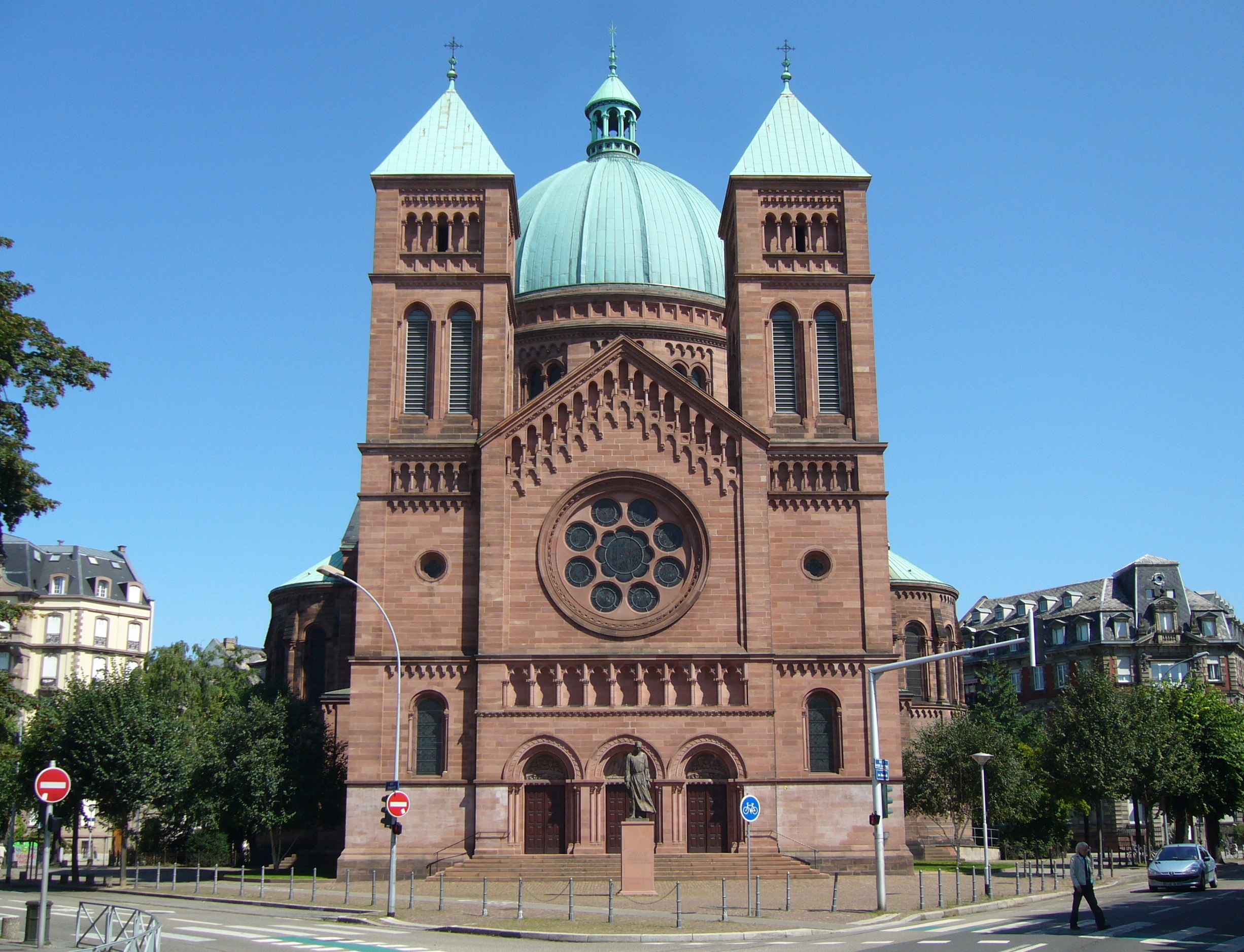
- Saint-Pierre-le-Jeune Catholic Church
- Location: Strasbourg
- Country: France
- Denomination: Roman Catholic Church

History
- Founded: 1888

Architecture
- Architect(s): August Hartel; Skjold Neckelmann
- Style: Romanesque Revival architecture
- Completed: 1893

Specifications
- Height: 50 m (160 ft) (inside)

Saint-Pierre-le-Jeune Catholic Church (French: Église Saint Pierre-le-Jeune catholique) is a late 19th-century Catholic church dedicated to Saint Peter in Strasbourg, France. It is not to be confused with the medieval Saint-Pierre-le-Jeune Protestant Church in the same city.

== History ==
Saint-Pierre-le-Jeune Catholic Church was built from 1889 to 1893 in the Neustadt district and stands next to the main courthouse Palais de Justice. Both buildings were designed by the architect Skjold Neckelmann (the church in collaboration with his professional partner August Hartel).

Before the current Church of Saint-Pierre-le-Jeune was built, Catholics and Lutherans in Strasbourg shared the nearby medieval church of the same name. The Catholics did not relinquish their claim to this older church until 1898.

== Appearance ==
Saint-Pierre-le-Jeune Catholic Church is built in rose sandstone. It is crowned with a heavy and imposing dome: interior diameter 18.5 m (61 ft), interior height 50 m (160 ft). The spacious interior of the church is decorated with altars, mosaics, and a very large circular chandelier. The current pipe organ was installed in 2003.

== Gallery ==
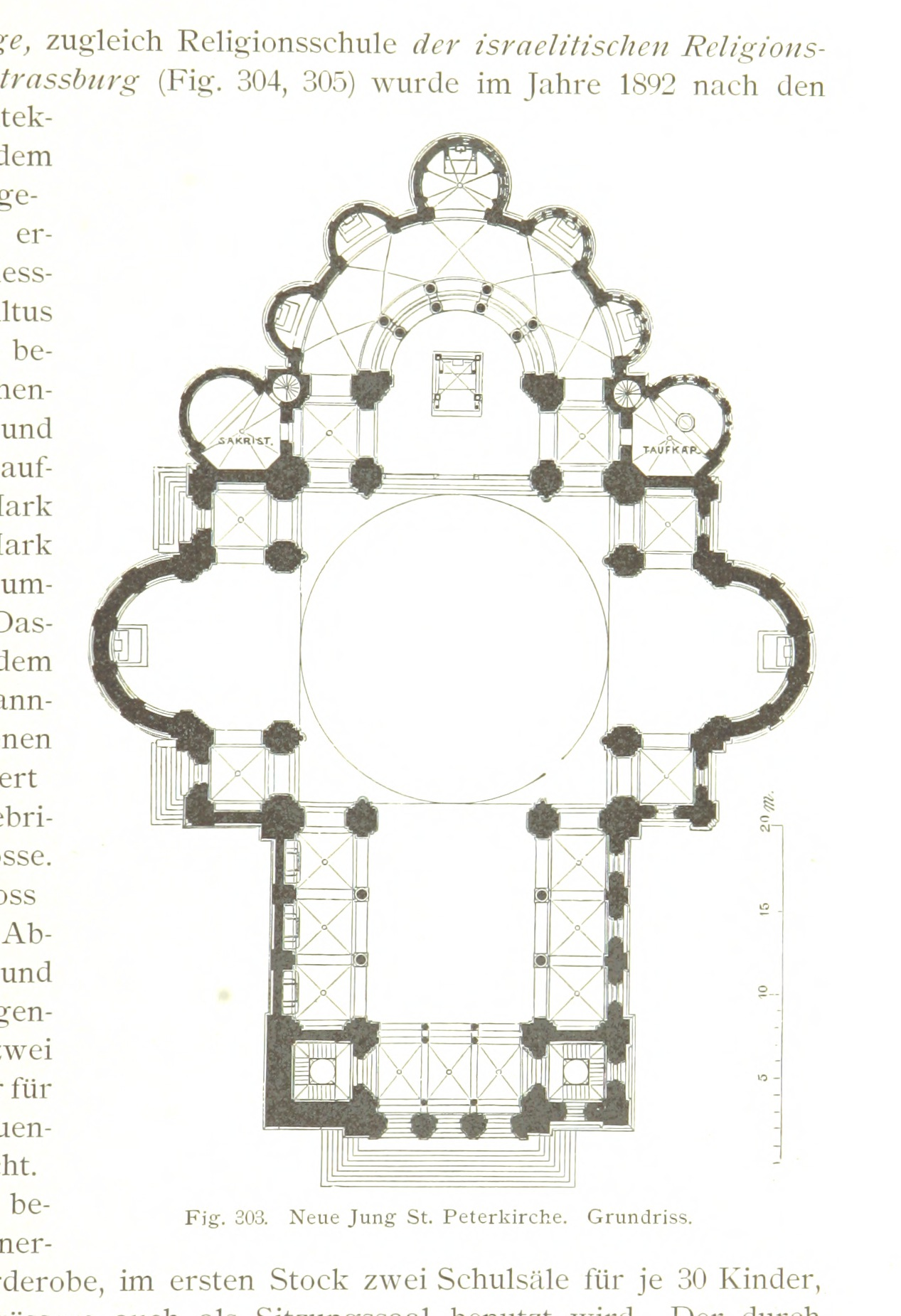
Floor plan (1894)

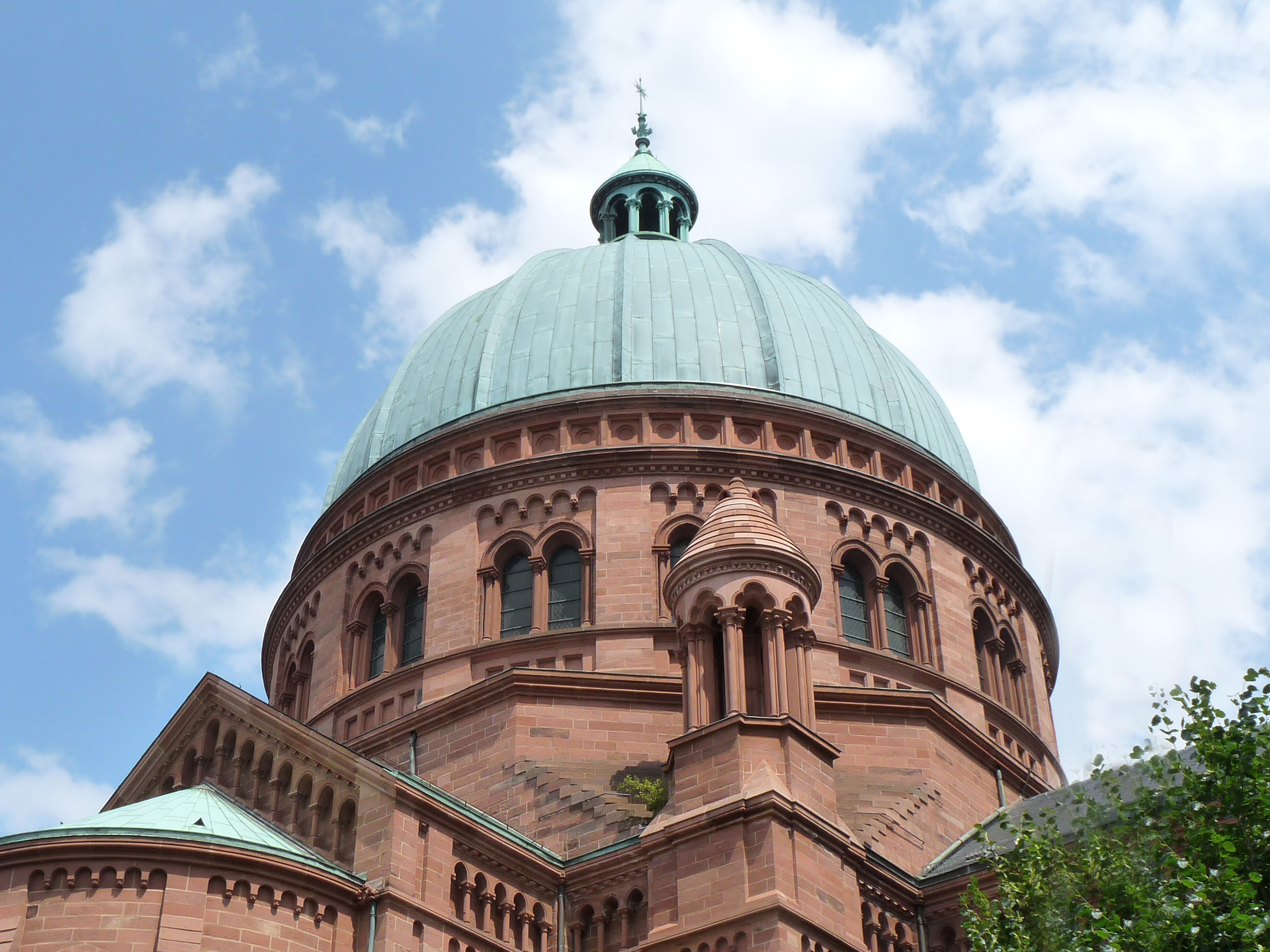
The dome

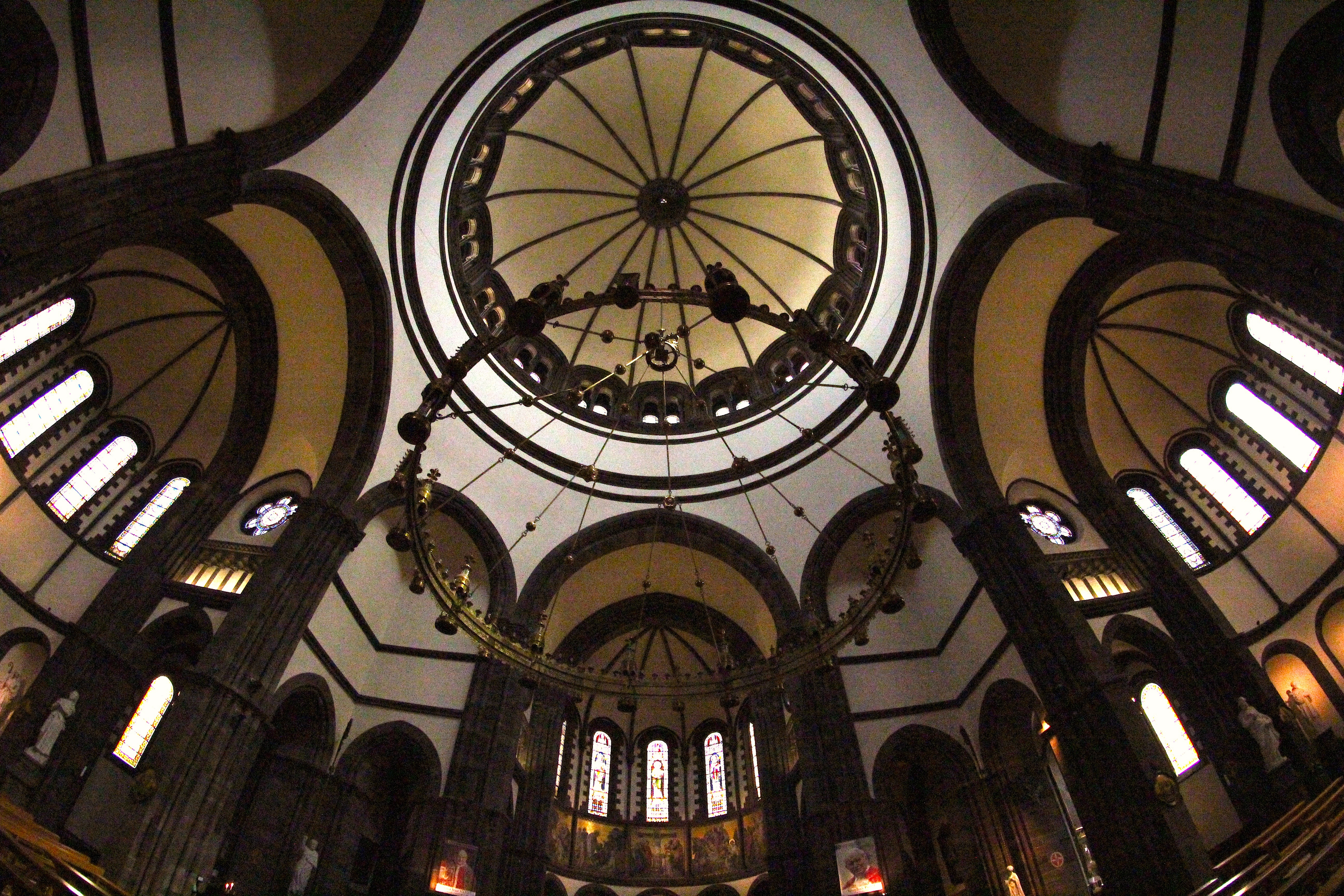
Inside the church

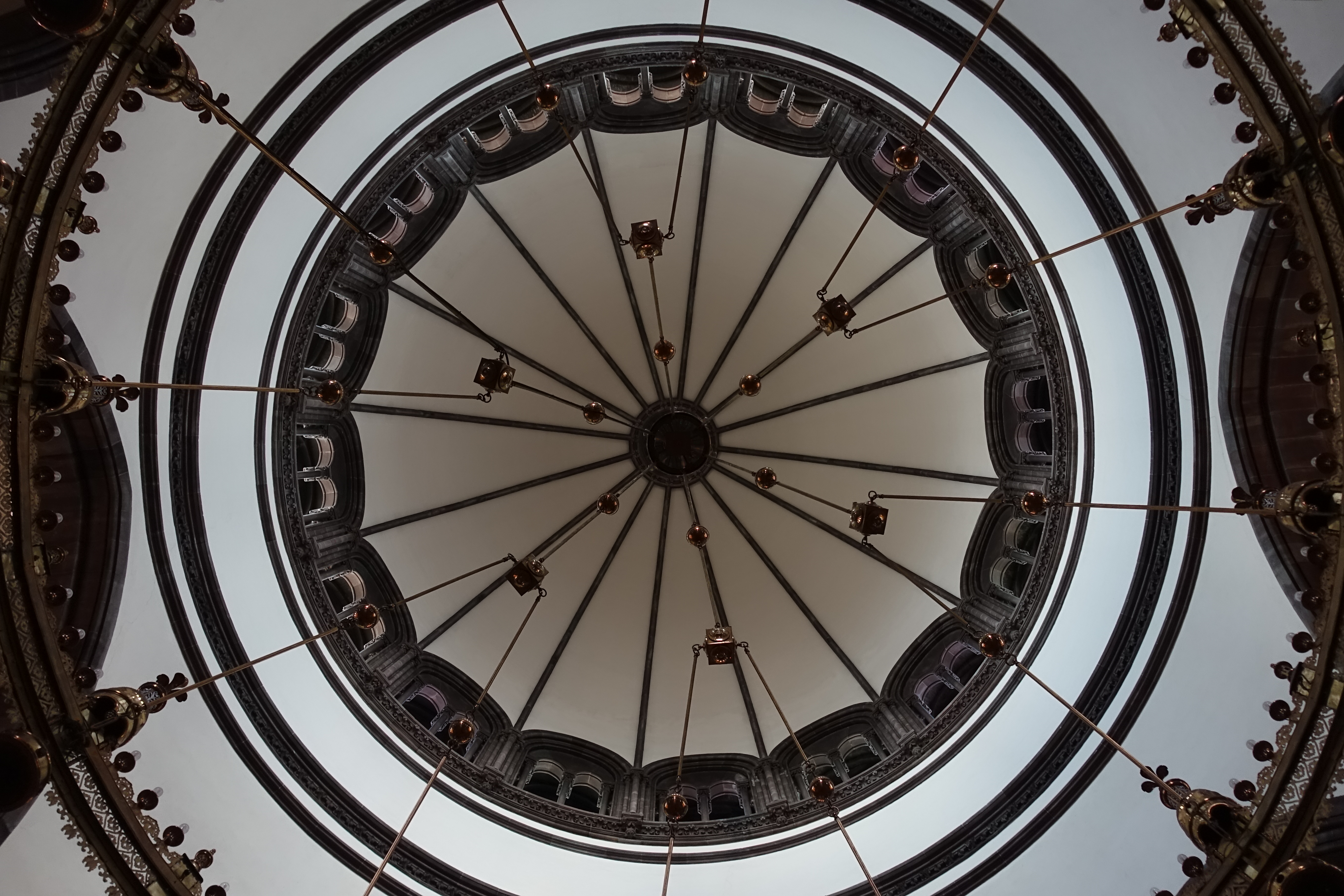
Looking up the dome through the circular chandelier

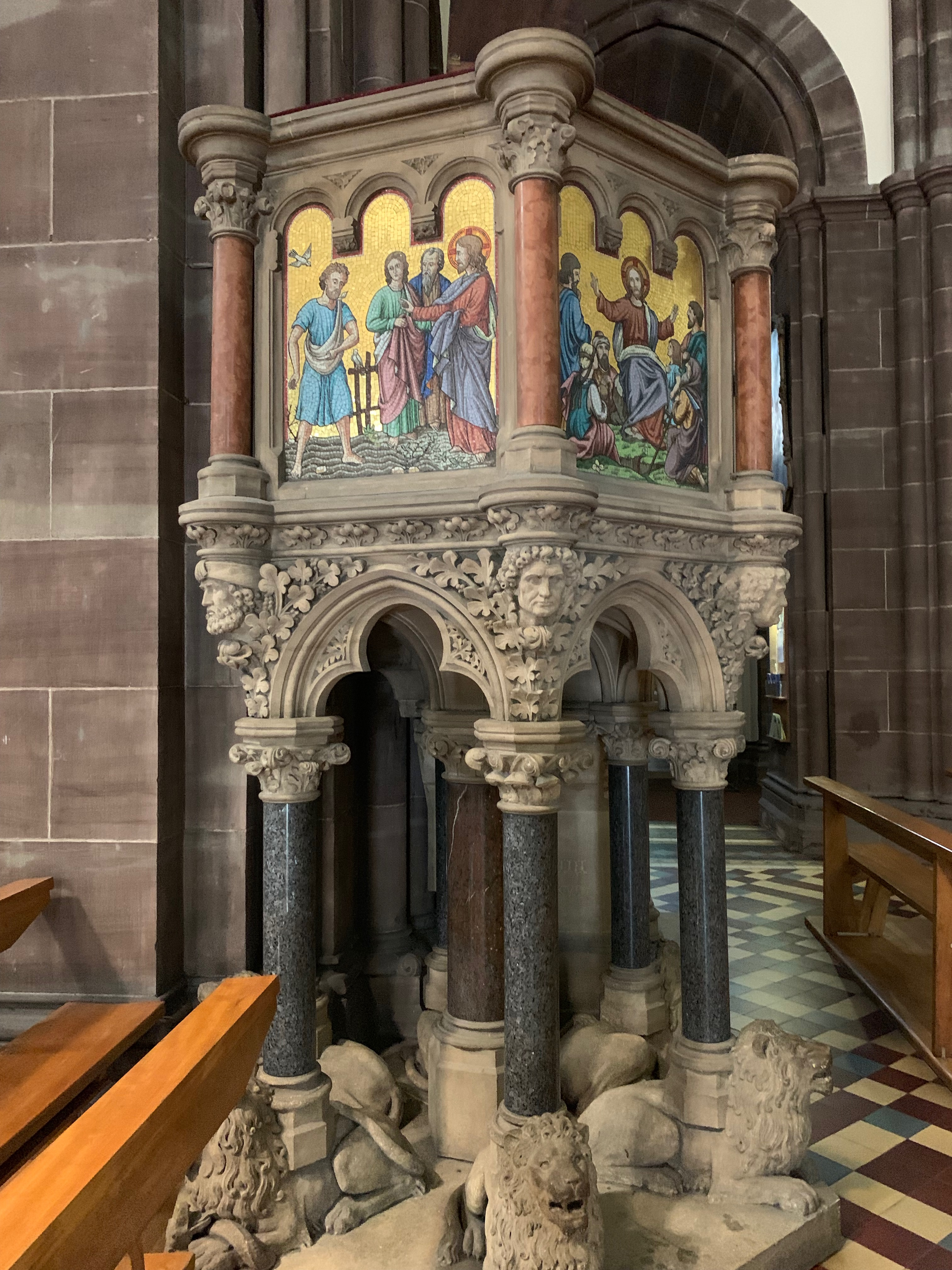
The pulpit

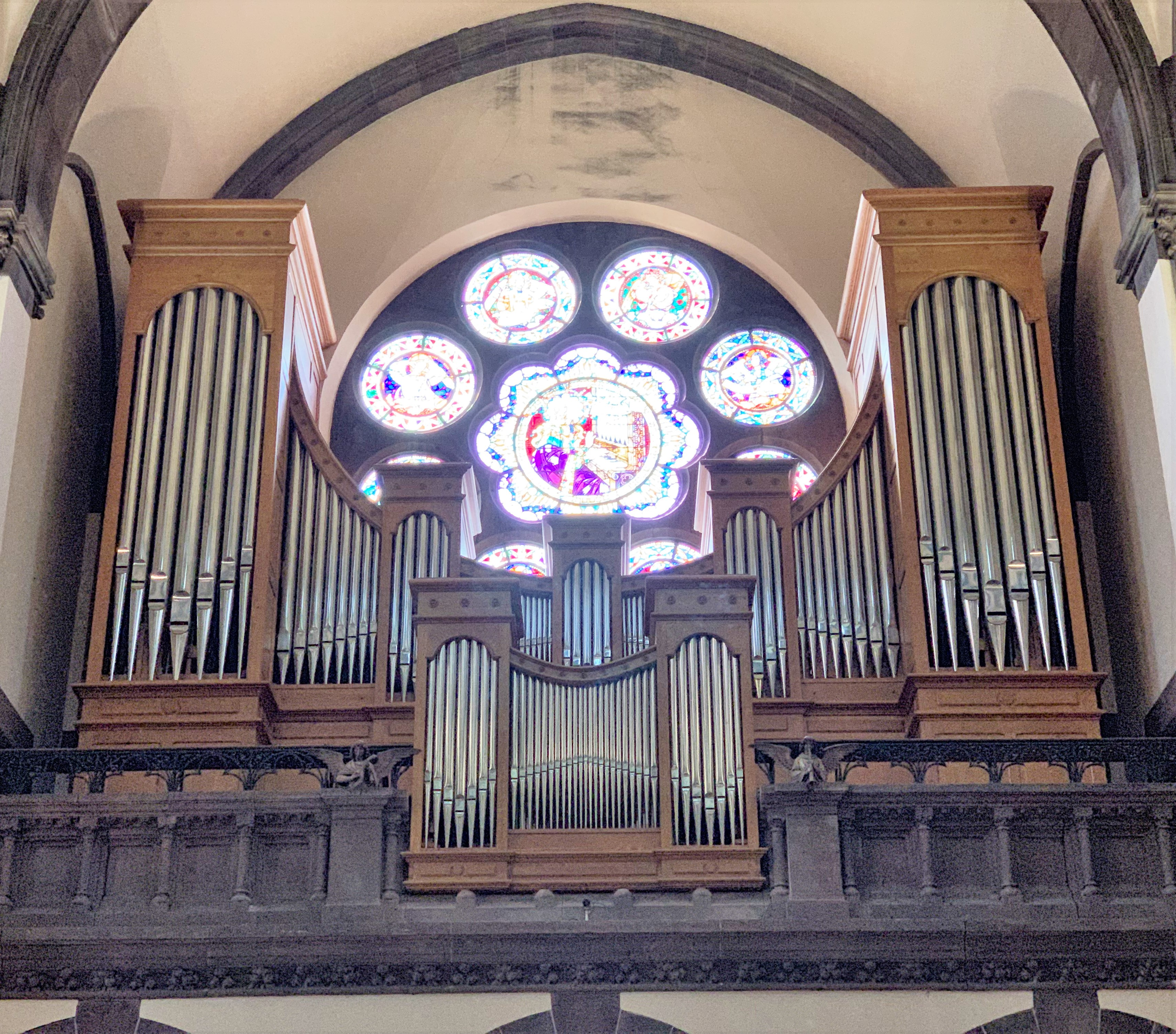
The pipe organ

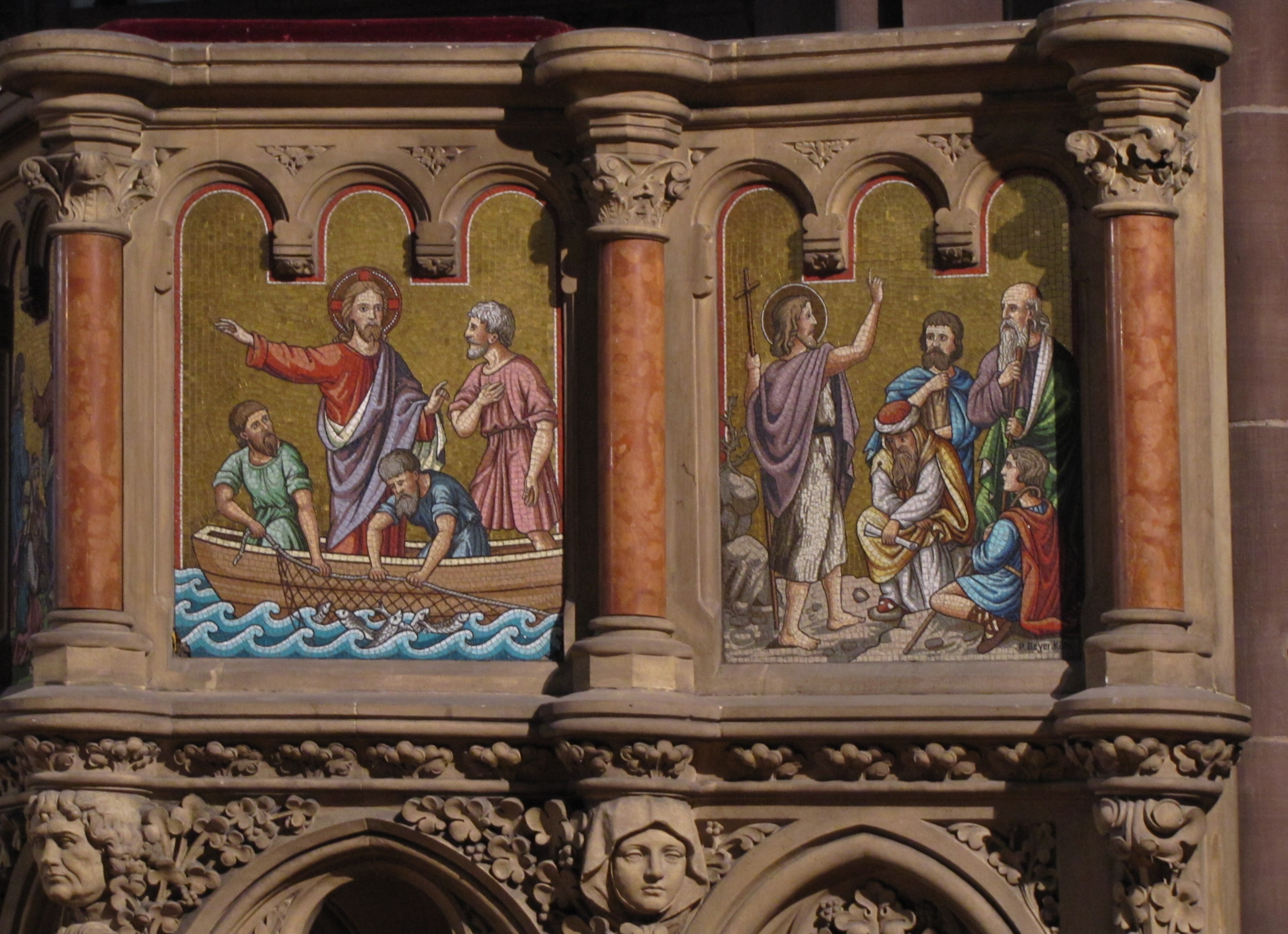
The miraculous draught of fish, from the pulpit
