= Skjold Neckelmann =

Danish-German architect

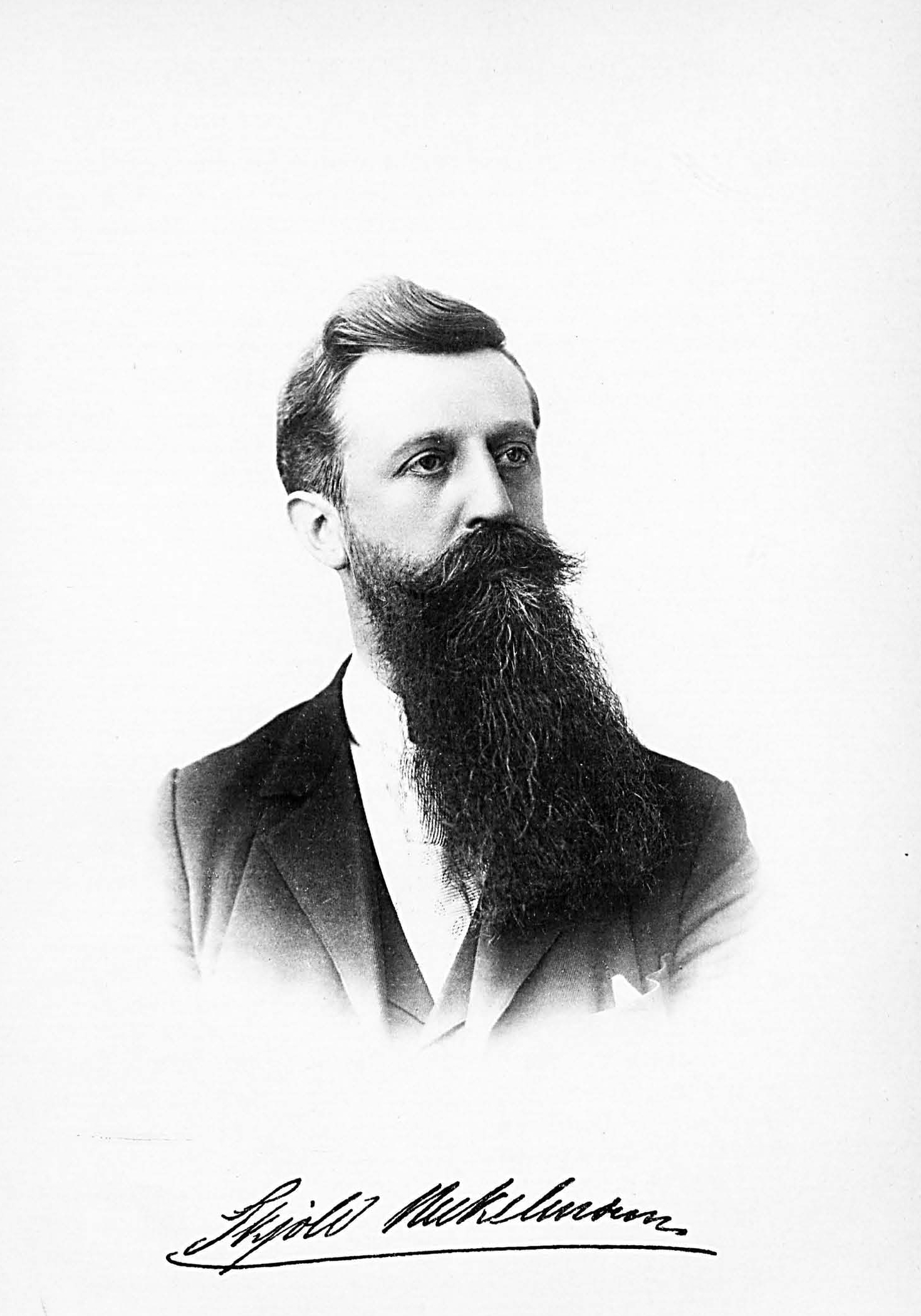
Skjold Neckelmann

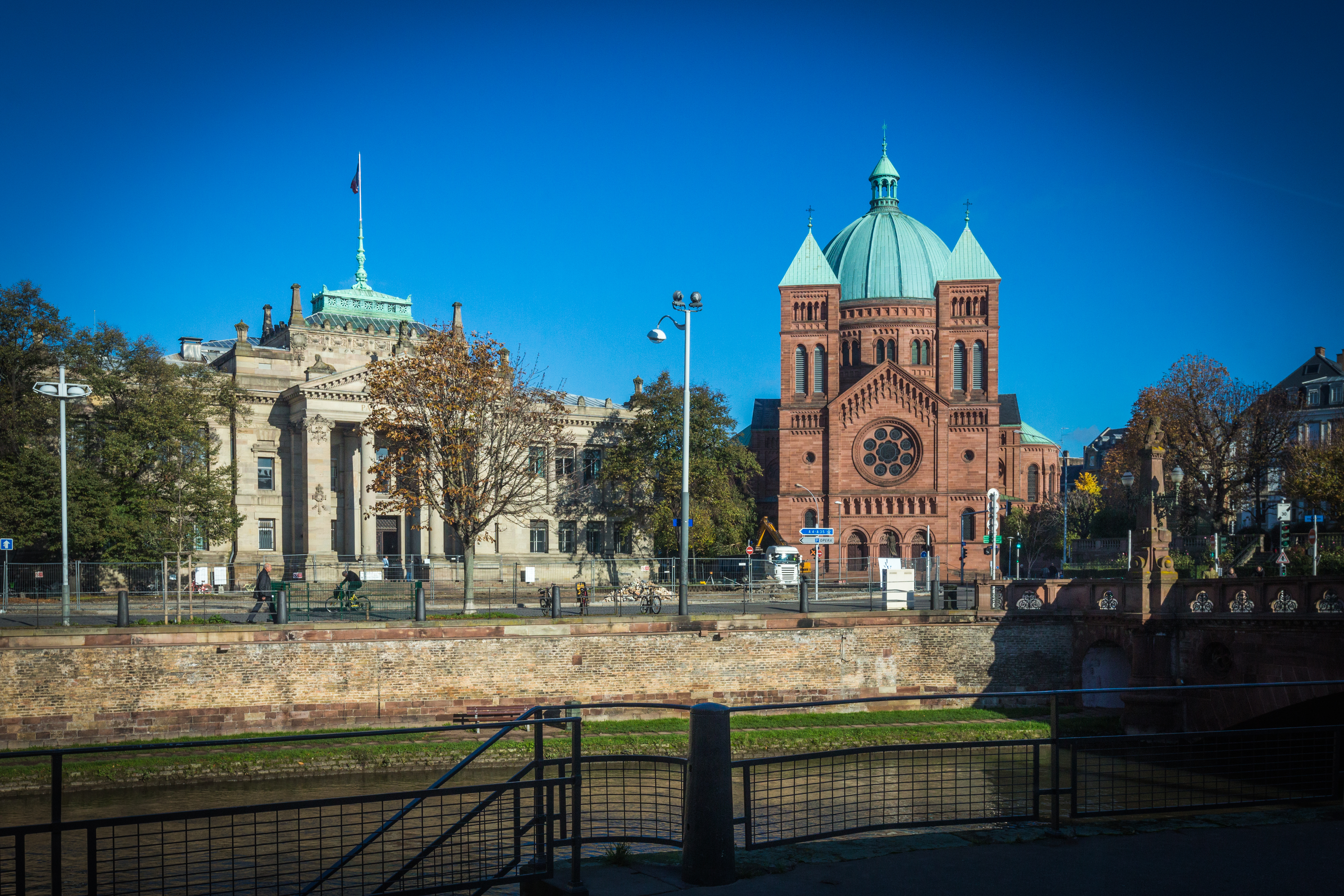
Courthouse Palais de Justice (left) and church Saint Pierre-le-Jeune catholique (right)

Skjold Neckelmann (born November 24, 1854 - May 13, 1903) was a Danish-German architect, best known for designing four Strasbourg buildings that are landmarks of the Neustadt district - the National and University Library, the National Theatre, the Palais de Justice and Saint-Pierre-le-Jeune Catholic Church.

== Biography ==
Neckelmann was born in Hamburg, Germany. He studied from 1874 in Vienna with Theophil Hansen.

During his most productive years, Neckelmann worked as an associate with the German architect August Hartel.

Neckelmann and Hartel designed many buildings together in Strasbourg including:

- 1888–1892: National Theatre (built to house the legislative assembly of the German Imperial territory of Alsace-Lorraine, of which Strasbourg was the capital from 1871 to 1918)
- 1889–1893: Church of Saint Pierre-le-Jeune catholique
- 1889–1895: National and University Library

Neckelmann and Hartel also designed the Christ Church, Cologne, and the Haus der Wirtschaft Baden-Württemberg in Stuttgart (1889-1896) which is now a museum.

When Hartel died in Strasbourg in 1890, Neckelmann was obliged to see through alone all the projects which they had conceived together. He went on to design the Strasbourg Palais de Justice (1894 - 1898) alone, but it was his last major project. In 1901 he ceased all professional activity for health reasons. He died during 1903 in Neckargemünd.

Neckelmann had spent many years in Stuttgart. For many years he ran an architect's cabinet in Stuttgart, where the architect Johann Emil Schaudt (1871-1957) once worked. He also taught architecture in Stuttgart. One of his pupils was Georg Stähelin (1872-1950).

He was the author of a number of books, mostly on architecture, but also a book on Danish philosophers of the Renaissance (Denkmäler der Renaissance in Dänemark).
