= Palais de Justice, Strasbourg =

Building in Strasbourg, France

Coordinates: 48.5882°N 7.7479°E

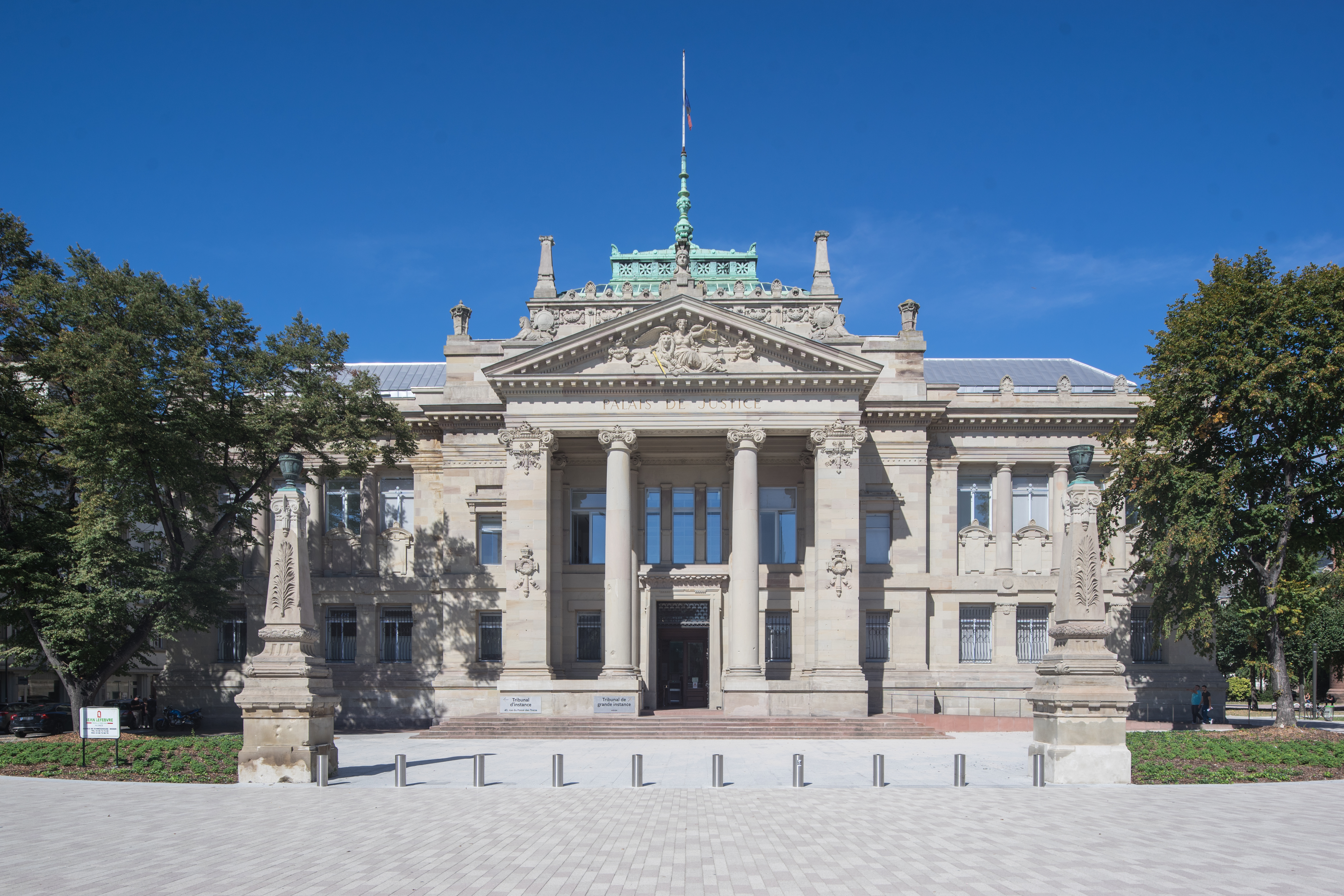
Outside view (2018)

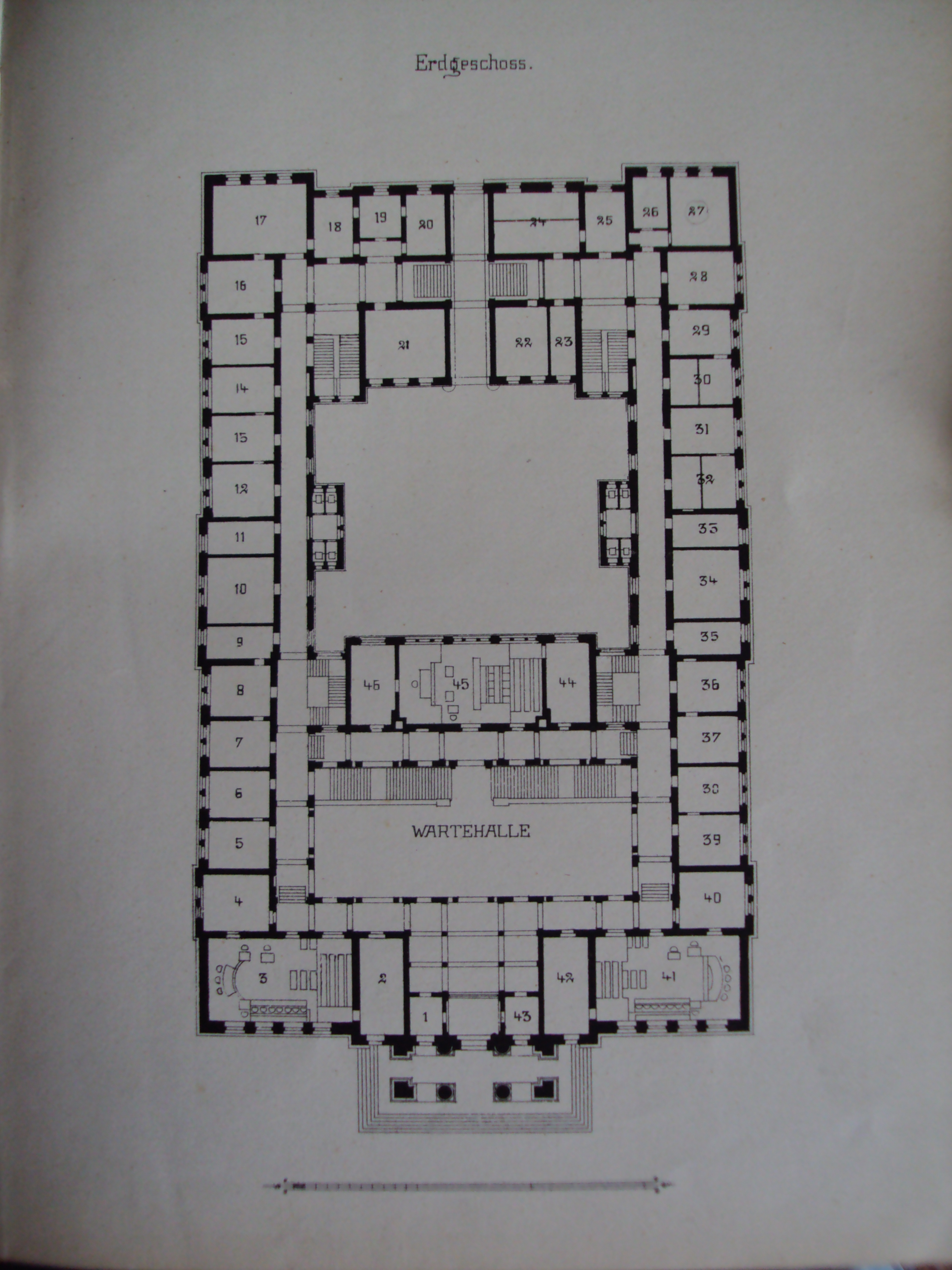
Palais Floor Plan

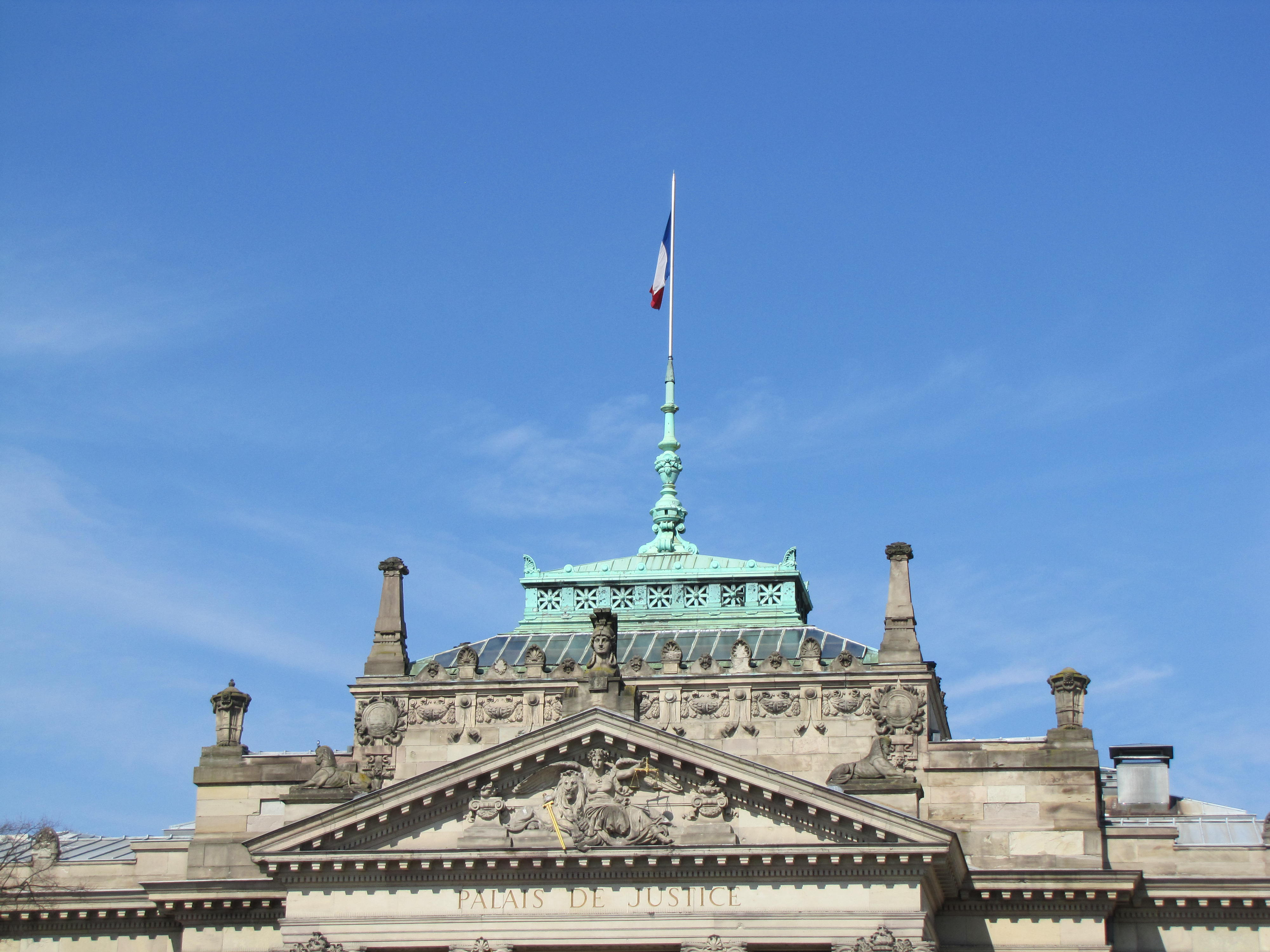
Pediment of façade

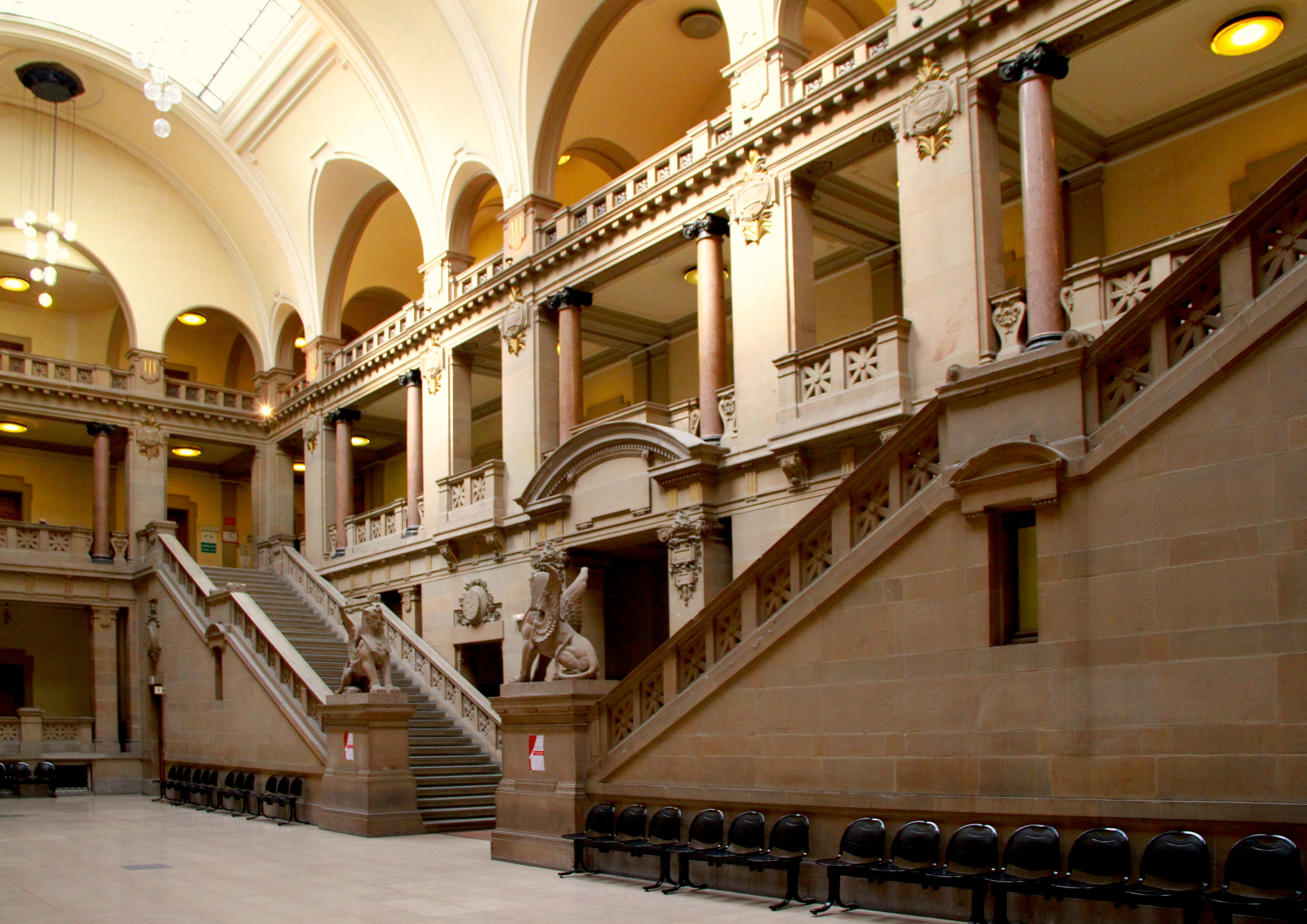
Staircase of great hall

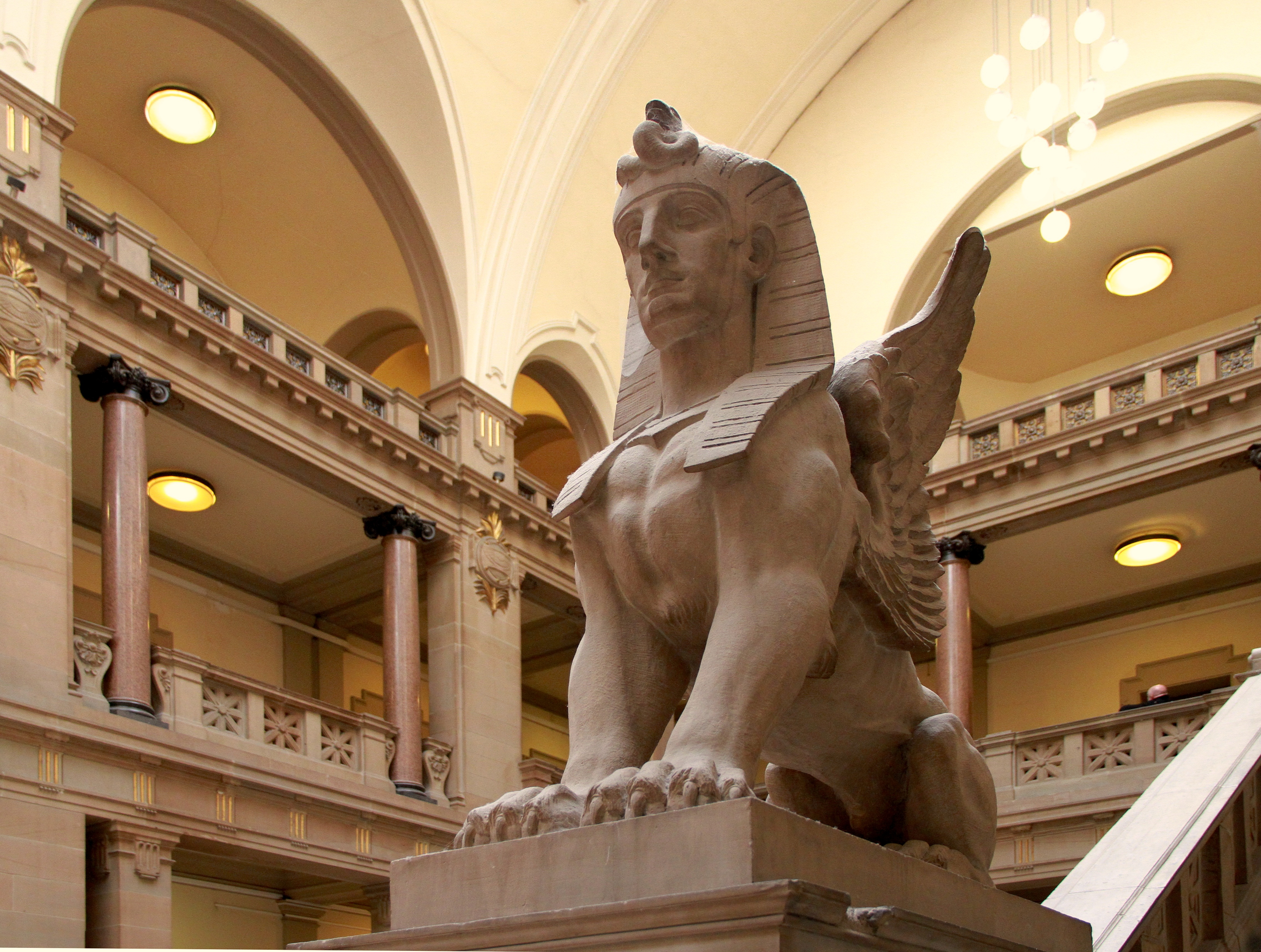
Sphinx in great hall

The Palais de Justice of Strasbourg is a large 19th-century neo-Greek building (with neo-Egyptian elements) in the Tribunal quarter of the Neustadt district of Strasbourg, France, which houses Strasbourg's main court, the Tribunal de Grande Instance.

== History ==
The Palais de Justice was built between 1894 and 1898 by the Danish architect Skjold Neckelmann, after the death of his partner August Hartel. It was to be his last major work. It stands next to the Catholic church Église Saint-Pierre-le-Jeune catholique, which had been designed by Hartel and Neckelmann in the Romanesque Revival style.

== Architecture ==
Originally designed by Johann Carl Ott, the design of the facade and vestibule were delegated to Skjold Neckelmann. Ott modeled his design after the courthouse in Le Havre, which was built in the Neo-Greek style. However, the goal for this building was to connect the Strasbourg judicial system to the Reich that predominantly ruled over the Alsace-Lorraine region. The Palais de Justice contrasts the medieval style of the city, further affirming the German influence. The antiquated Greek architectural style was used to help establish the symbolism of the acquisition of a French town within the German Reich.

The Palais, designed in Greek Revival style, features a large portico with Ionic columns, surmounted by a triangular pediment that is decorated with the allegories of Justice (under the figure of the goddess Athena) and Fortitude or Courage, with two sphinxes. The entrance gate features a mask of Gorgon, believed to ward off evil. A sphinx stands guard at the top of the stairway leading to the court rooms. The floor plan features four wings arranged around a central courtyard with a glass roof.

At the time of construction, the Palais was considered a modern building. It featured traditional materials like a mosaic floor, linoleum, and Phalsbourg gray sandstone. It was also outfitted with a low-pressure steam central heating system and electrical lighting. The building has a processional experience, beginning with the public space at the ground level. As someone transitions from the ground floor to the judicial section on the second level, they are met by the figures of Justice. As one moves to the next level, the experience becomes brighter as the Pas-Perdus room is flooded with natural light from the skylights.

== Renovation ==
In the 21st century, there was a long debate as to whether to build a new courthouse or to renovate the existing building. The latter option was finally chosen, with work beginning at the end of 2013. The work, which extended the existing building, was assigned to the Spanish architect Jordi Garcés, and was completed in 2016, at a cost of 63.2 million euros. However, the renovation plans of Garcés were contested in the courts by the Association des Vieux amis de Strasbourg, on the grounds that they involved the destruction of three courtrooms that are designated as monuments historiques.

Renovation work included improved lighting through glass installments and modern fixtures. The sequential procession through the building was retained, but improvements were made to make it a more logical experience. The public can utilize glass plate shelters to be directed to the center of the building. Interior galleries and patios look out onto a central garden, adding a contemporary spin on the courtyard experience. Skylights were used throughout the renovation to increase the quality of natural light.

== Historical monument ==
On 2 July 1992, the facades, the inner courtyard (Salle des pas perdus) and the courtrooms were classified as a monument historique.
