= National Academic Library (Strasbourg) =

Public library in Strasbourg, France

Coordinates: 48°35′14″N 7°45′22″E

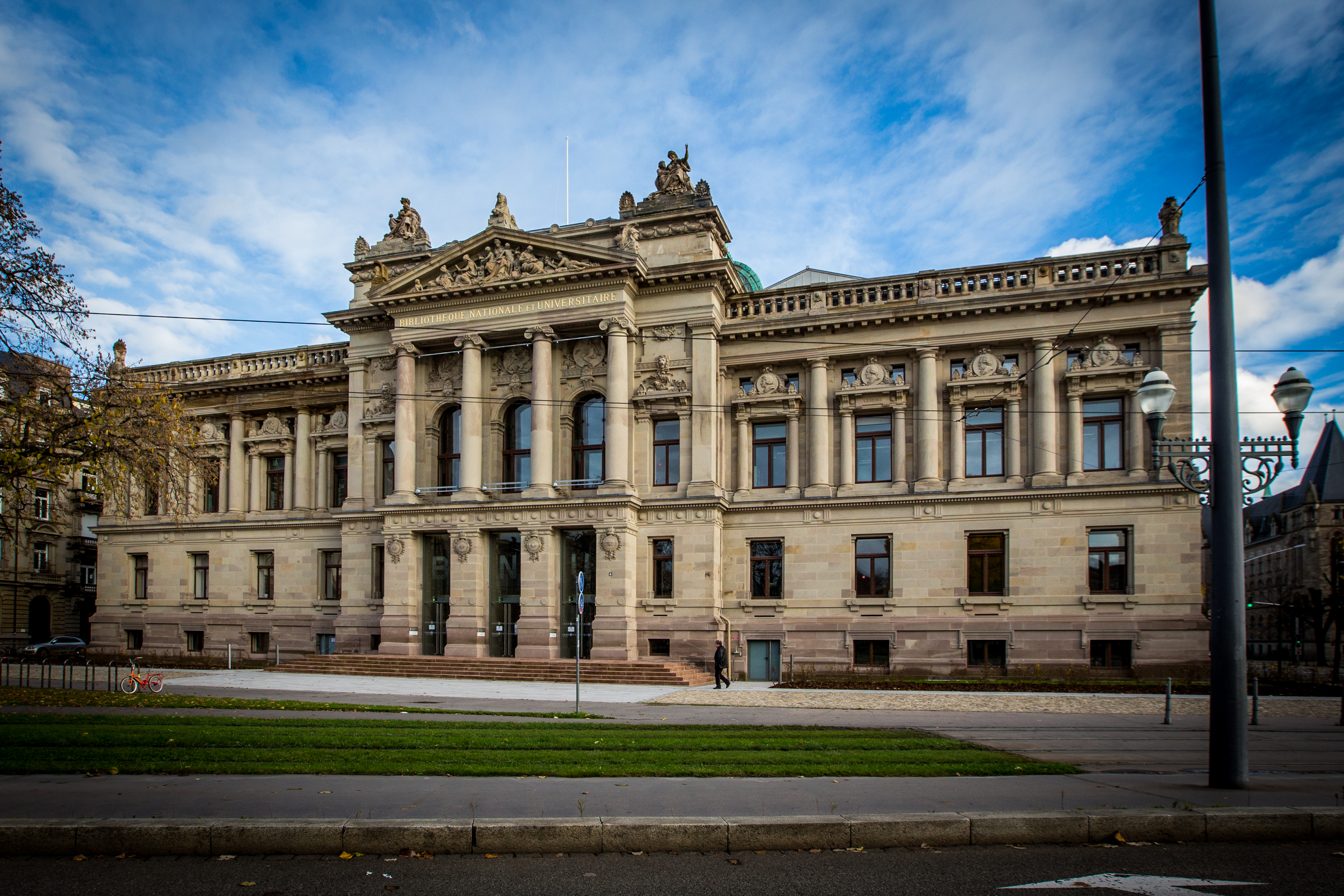
The library after restoration in 2014.

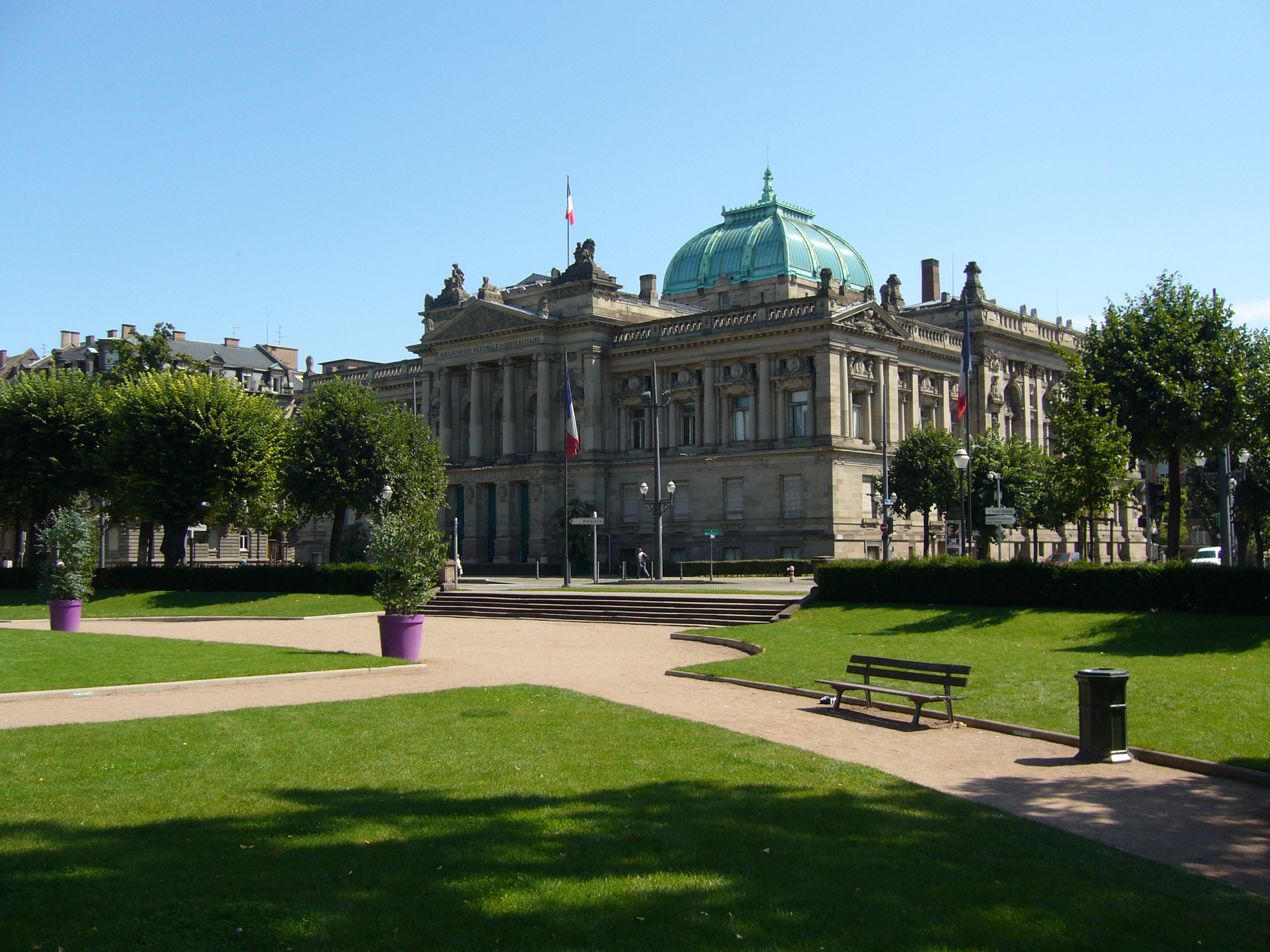
View of the library through the Place de la République

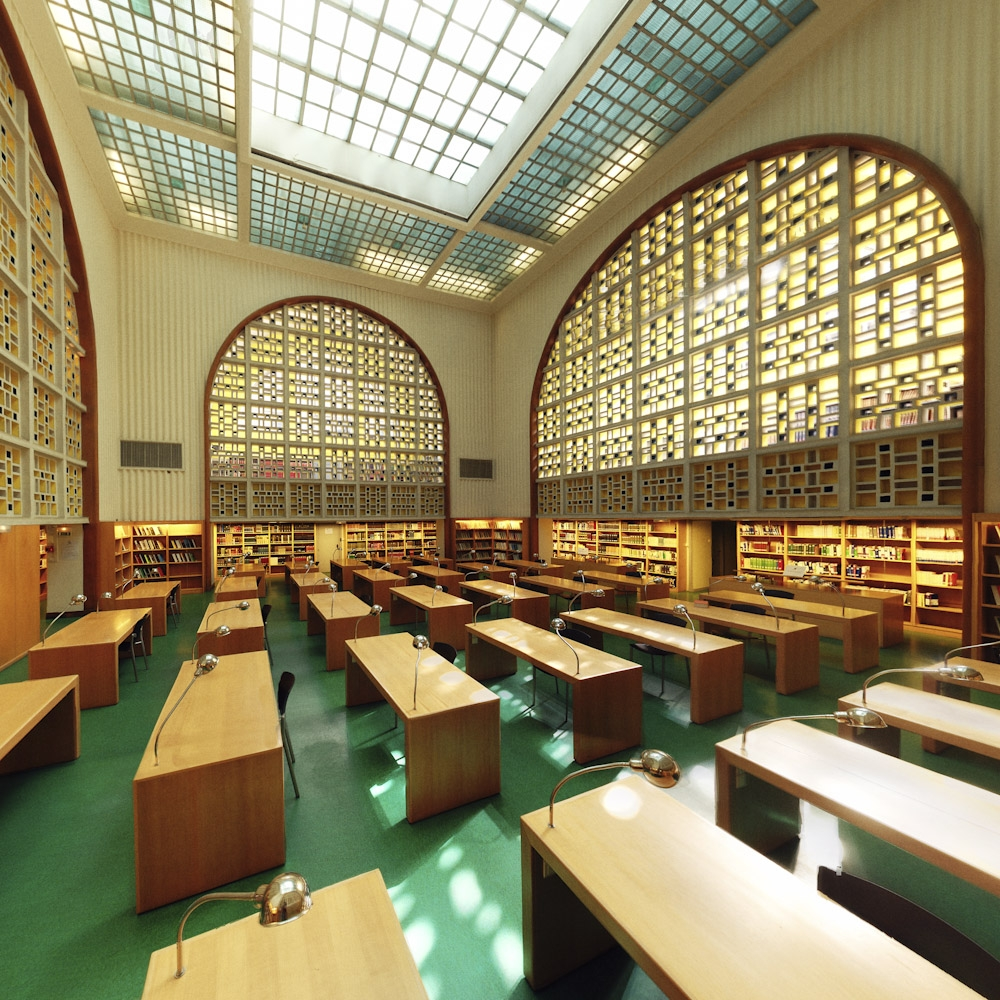
Former main reading room of the library, built in 1950, destroyed in 2012 (architect: François Herrenschmidt)

The National Academic Library (French: Bibliothèque nationale et universitaire; abbreviated BNU) is a public library in Strasbourg, France. It is located on the Place de la République, the former Kaiserplatz, and faces the Palais du Rhin.

== History ==
After the destruction of the municipal library and the city's archives by Prussian artillery during the Siege of Strasbourg, the German Empire founded the BNU on 19 June 1872. The task of arranging its collections was given to historian and professor, Rodolphe Reuss.

It became the regional library for the Reichsland Alsace-Lorraine, as, according to German tradition, every region should have at least one library. It was also an Academic library.

The collections grew quickly, thanks principally to donations from all across Europe and the United States. But, even in spite of these generous donations, many priceless manuscripts, such as the Hortus Deliciarum had been destroyed and could never be replaced.

The present-day building, which is a work of architects August Hartel and Skjold Neckelmann, was opened in 1895.

After the territory of Alsace-Lorraine had been reverted to France following World War I, the question arose as to whether or not this library should be renovated and reopened. After some hesitation, the French government decided to keep the library.

The library now holds about 3,300,000 volumes and a total of 4,000,000 documents, which is the second largest collection in France. The collection contains, amongst other things, ca. 2,300 incunabula, 6,700 manuscripts (plus 29,000 others from the archives – kept by the library – of the De Turckheim family, and several other thousands from the Alsatian Franciscan order) and 5,200 papyri.

== See also ==
- List of libraries in France
