= Cathy Josefowitz =

Cathy Josefowitz (1956 – 28 June 2014) was an international artist with US and Swiss citizenship.

== Life and work ==
Josefowitz was born in New York City and moved with her parents at an early age to Switzerland. She studied set design at the National Theatre of Strasbourg before moving to Paris where she earned a degree in visual arts at the École des Beaux-Arts. In 1987, she attended the School for New Dance Development in Amsterdam. Later in her life she worked and lived in Paris, Boston, Amsterdam and Italy.

Her work included paintings and drawings in conversation with choreography. Her extensive work is increasingly exhibited in the context of current discourses on figuration, gender, the body, otherness and identity.

In 2007, Josefowitz was diagnosed with cancer. She died in Geneva.

Since 2023, Josefowitz's estate has been represented by Hauser & Wirth.

== Exhibitions ==
- 2022: The Thinking Body, Museum of Contemporary Art of Rome, Rome
- 2021/22: The Thinking Body, Centre Culturel Suisse, Paris
- 2021: The Thinking Body, Kunsthaus Langenthal, Langenthal
- 2021: Empty rooms full of love, FRAC Champagne-Ardenne, Reims
- 2007: Espace Hippomène, Genf
- 2003: Galerie Nicolas Deman, Paris
- 1994: Palazzo Pinucci, Galleria Via Larga, Florence

== Publications ==
- Cathy Josefowitz, Monograph, Textes from Ludovic Delalande, Rebecca Lamarche-Vadel, Elise Lammer, Mousse Publishing, 2019, ISBN 978-88-6749-404-0
- Cathy Josefowitz. Dance Eat Love, Monograph, Text by Rebecca Lamarche-Vadel, Editions Dilecta, 2018, ISBN 978-2-37372-074-7

== Films ==
- Painting dancing: Cathy Josefowitz, a film by François Lévy Kuentz, Fotografien von Mara De Wit, Pierre Yves Dhinaut, 52min, 2011
- Cathy Josefowitz, a film by François Lévy Kuentz, 31min, 2004
