= Saint-Pierre-le-Jeune Protestant Church =

Protestant Church in Strasbourg, France

Coordinates: 48°35′08″N 7°44′47″E

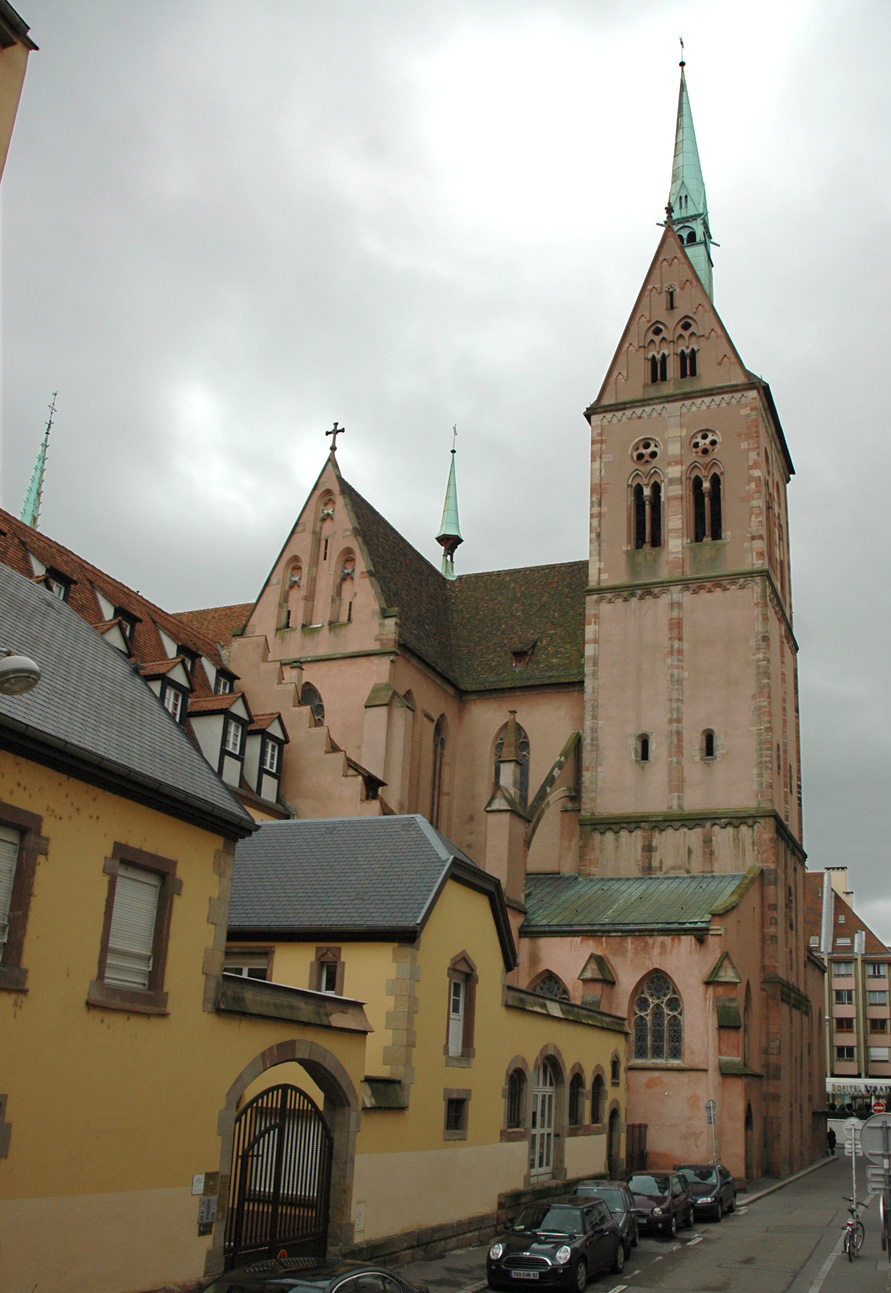
View of the steeple from the north

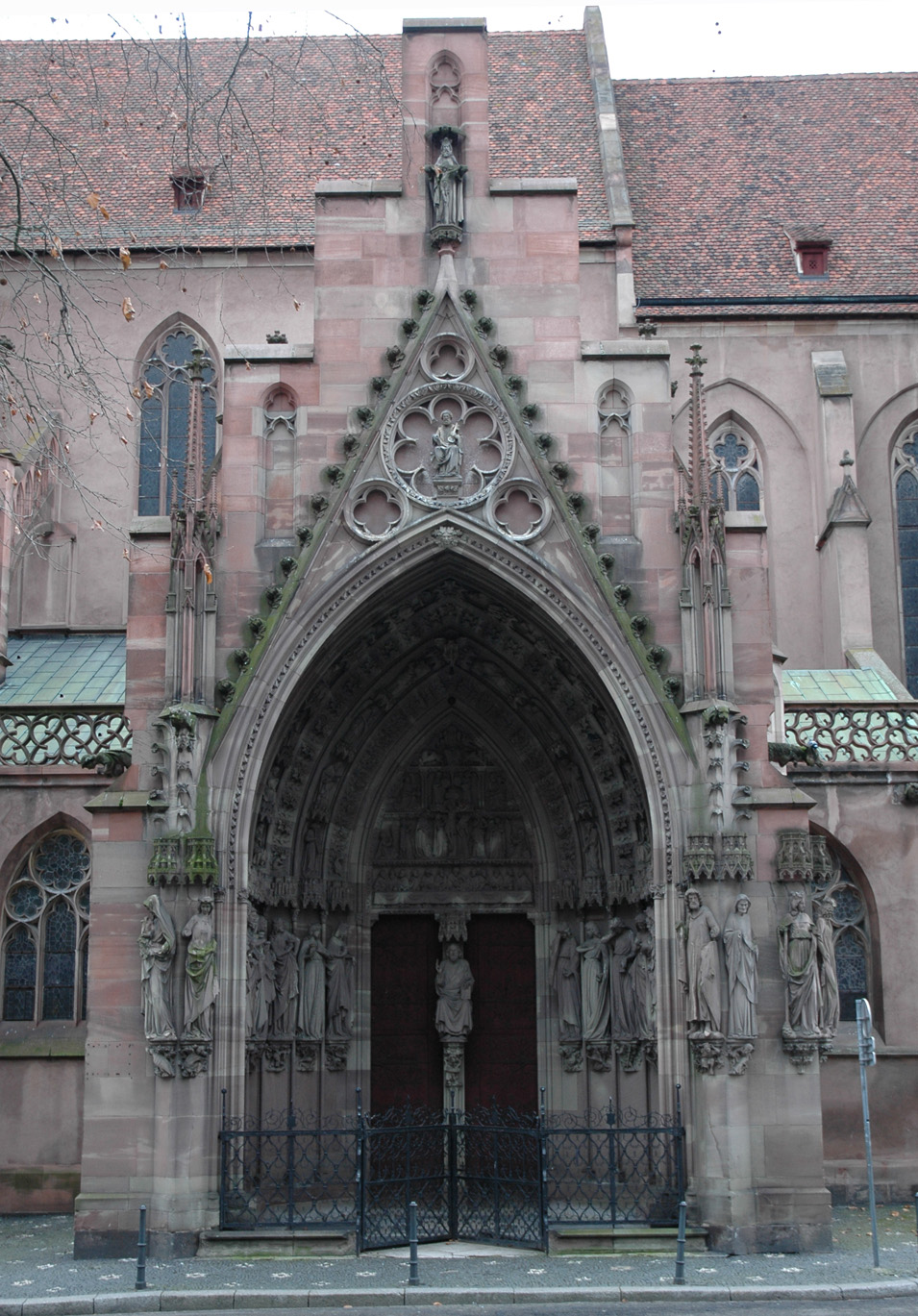
Main portal

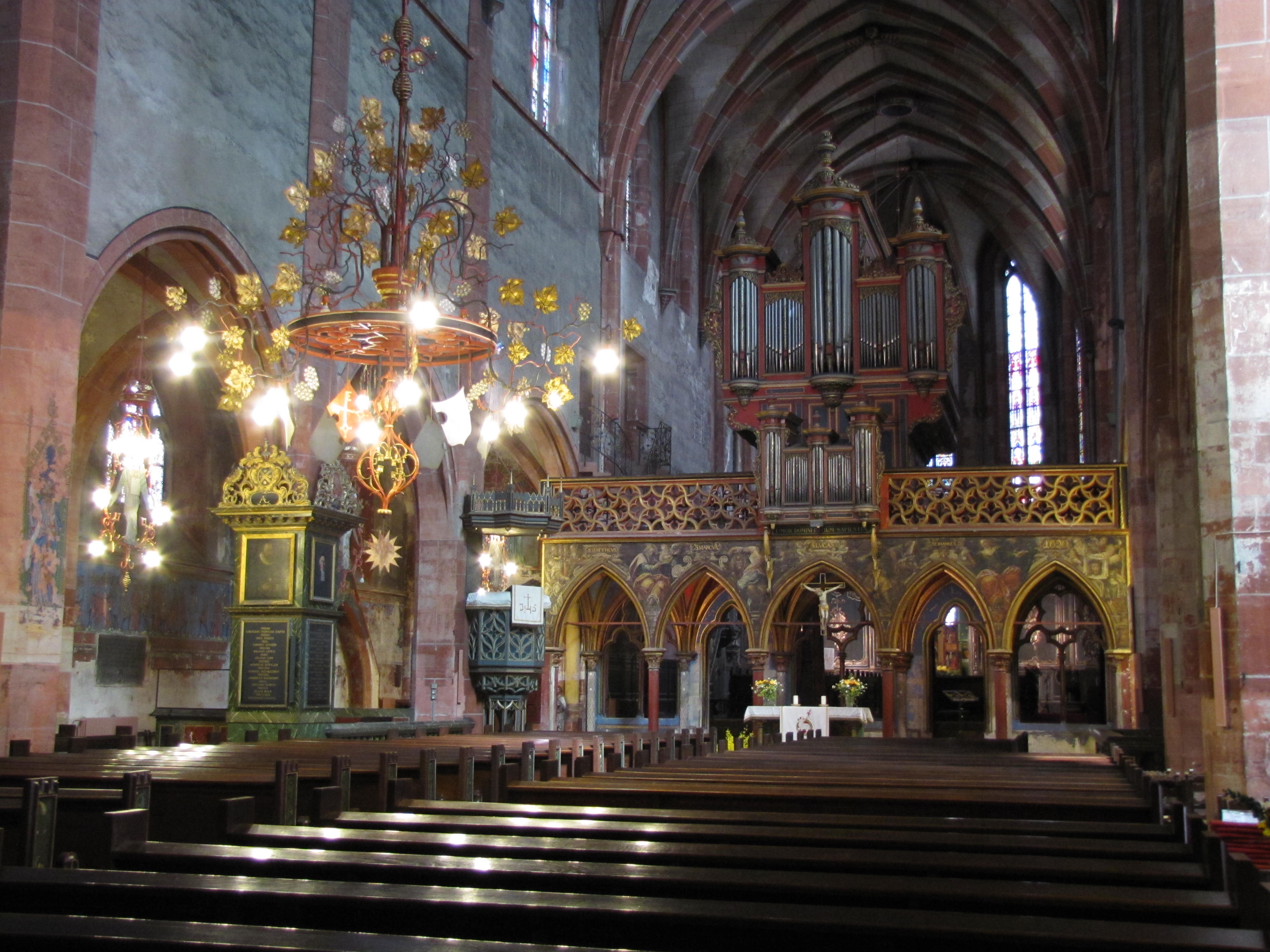
View of the choir screen and the organ

The Saint-Pierre-le-Jeune Protestant Church (Église protestante Saint-Pierre-le-Jeune; German: Jung-Sankt-Peter protestantisch) is one of the most important church buildings of the city of Strasbourg, France, from the art historical and architectural viewpoints. It got its name, "Young St. Peter's", because of the existence of three other St. Peter's churches in the same city: Saint-Pierre-le-Vieux ("Old St. Peter's"), divided into a Catholic and a Lutheran church, and Saint-Pierre-le-Jeune catholique, a massive neo-Romanesque domed church from the late 19th century.

The church has been Lutheran since 1524 and its congregation forms part of the Protestant Church of Augsburg Confession of Alsace and Lorraine. It is located on the Route Romane d'Alsace.

== Architecture and furnishings ==
- The oldest part of the church is the small lower church used as a burial crypt, which is the remains of a Columban church erected in the 7th century.
- Three of the four arched galleries of the cloister date from the 11th century, the fourth arched gallery is from the 14th century.
- The Gothic main building, with its numerous chapels and the lavish rib vault dates from the 14th century. There are many frescoes from this time and the following one-and-one-half centuries, memorial slabs and monuments, the baptismal font, the central painting of the high altar and the choir screen, now unique in Alsace, which have also been maintained.
- In 1780, the now nationally famous choir organ of Johann Andreas Silbermann was built (restored in 1948 and 1966 according to the rules of the Organ reform movement). Helmut Walcha recorded a large part of his performances of Bach's organ works here. The pulpit also dates from the same century, as well as another altar.
- Between 1897 and 1901, the church, which had fallen into disrepair, was fundamentally overhauled by the Karlsruhe architect Carl Schäfer, one of the most important representatives of neo-Gothic sacred architecture in Germany. At that time, the entrance was moved to the side and a new main portal was created, a copy of the northern entrance of the facade of the Strasbourg Cathedral. The cloisters were painted in polychrome, following the example of the Hortus Deliciarum. The life-sized baptismal angel statue, along with the chapel and the choir glass windows, also date from this time.

An organ built in 1762 by Johann Andreas Silbermann in the Catholic part of the two-part church of that time was transferred in 1865 to the St. Moriz Church of the parish of Soultz-les-Bains. There, it has been restored to its 1848 condition, a compromise between the original baroque Silbermann settings and the later Romantic tone and harmonic extensions, by the family of Alfred Kern & fils between 2006 and 2008.

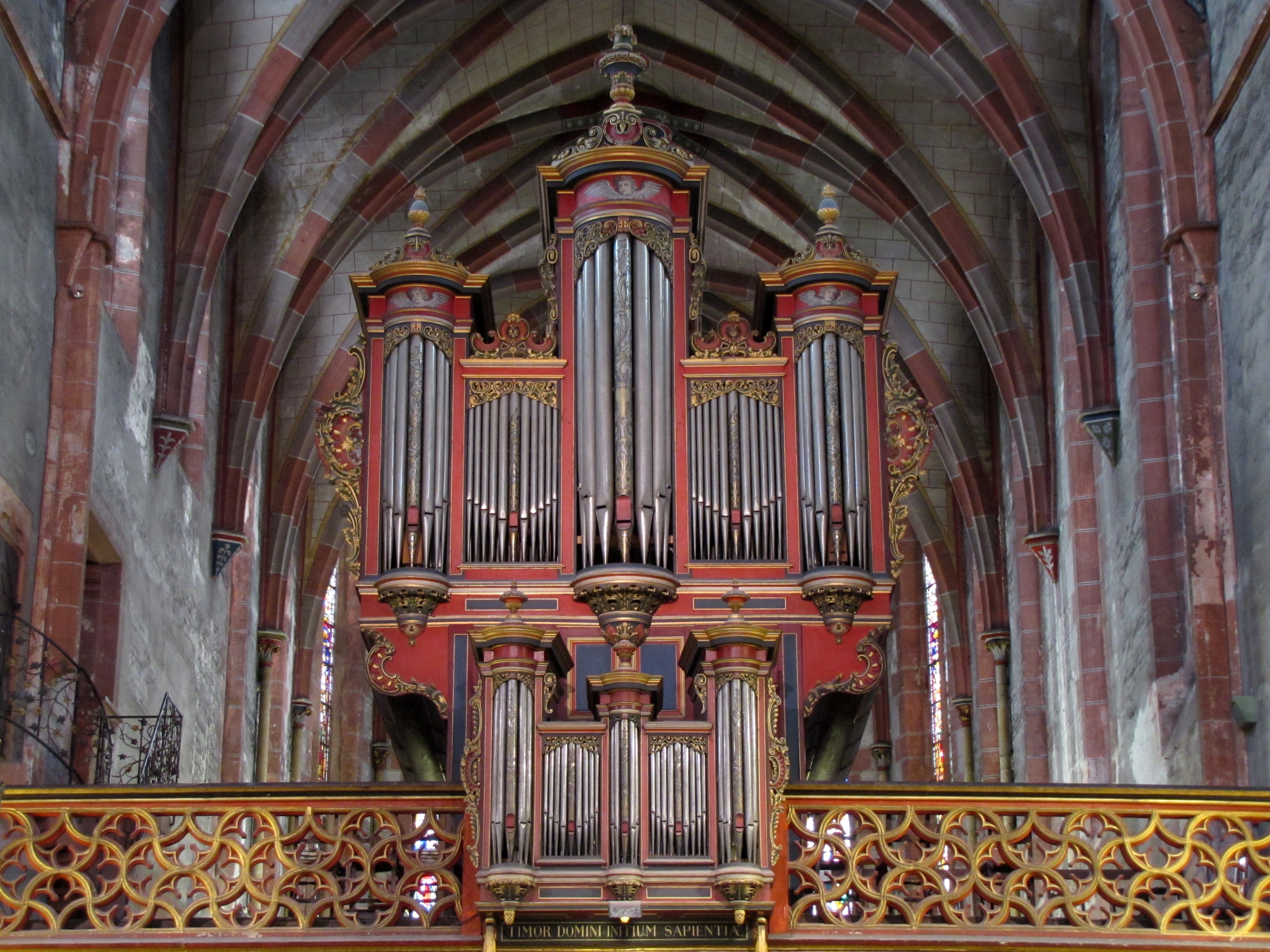
Close-up of the pipe organ

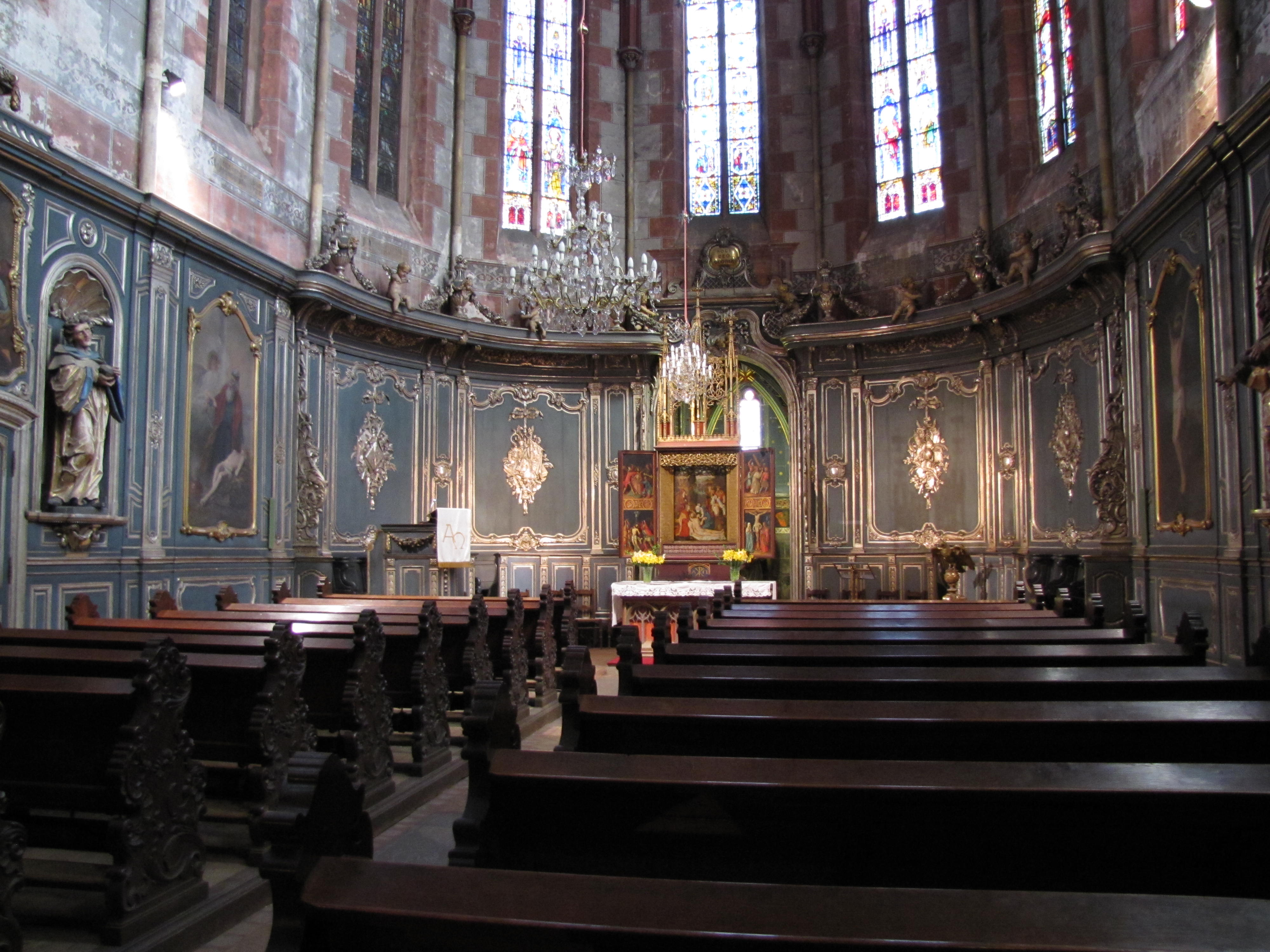
The choir

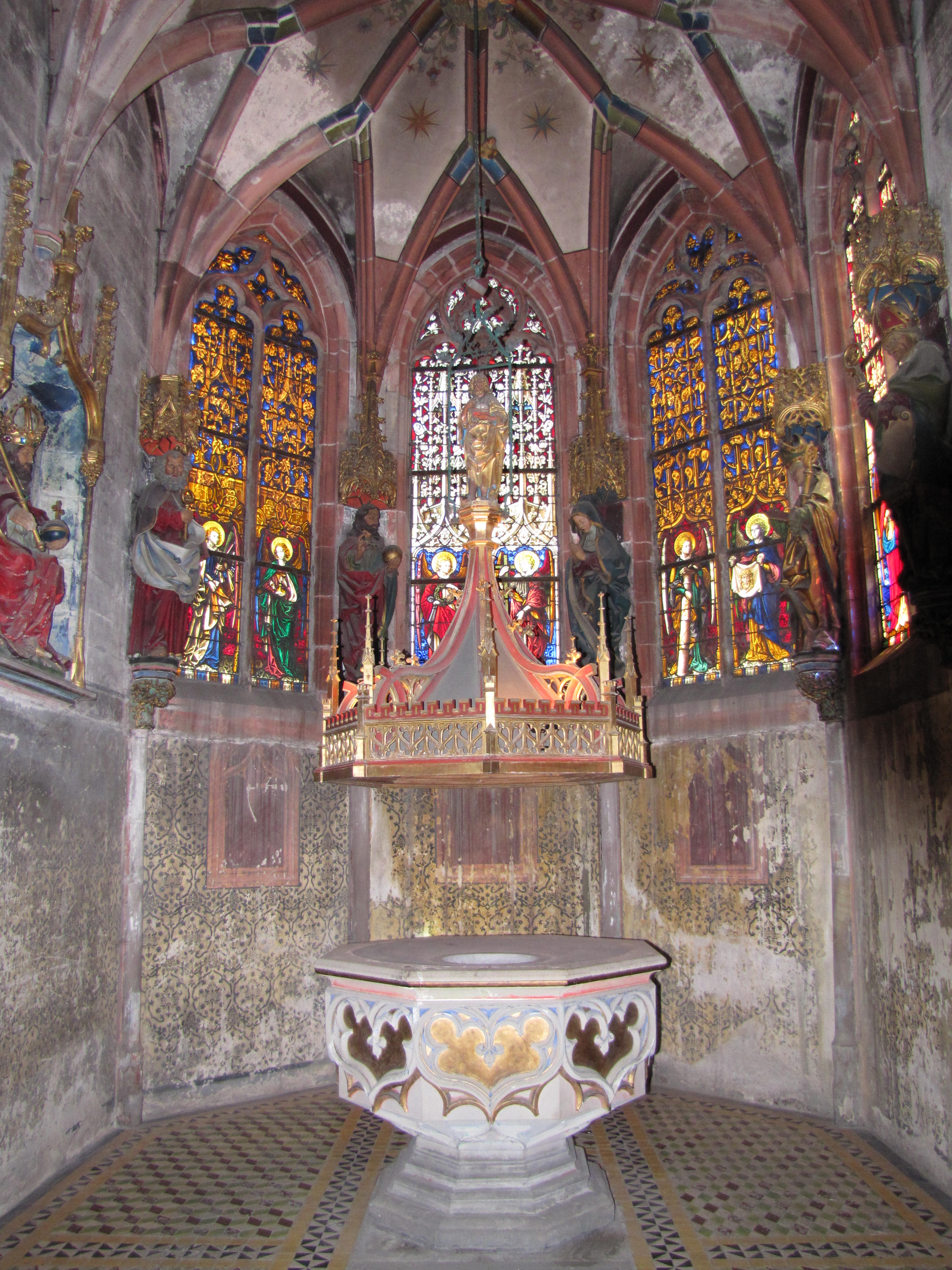
Baptismal fonts

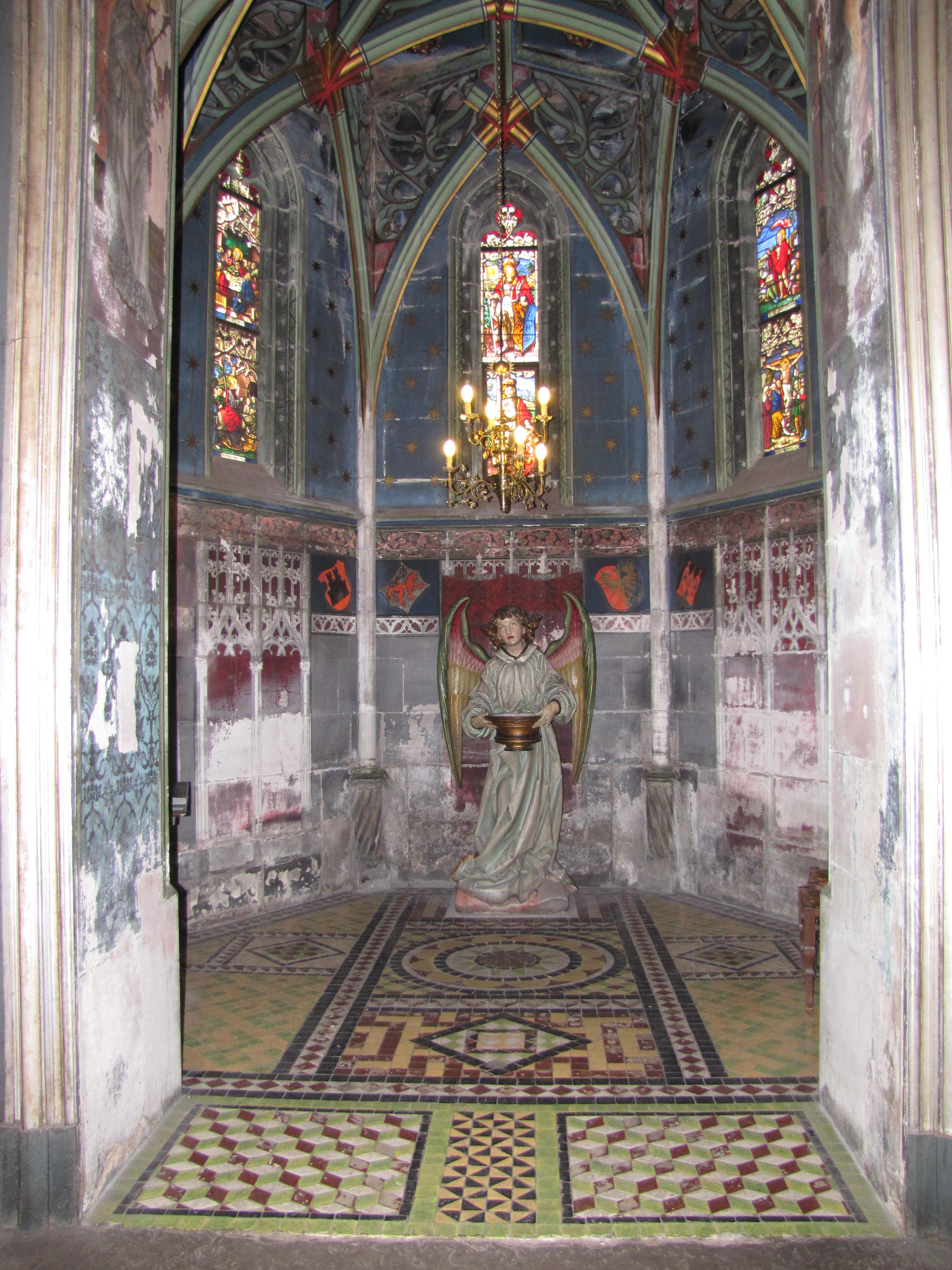
Angel stoup

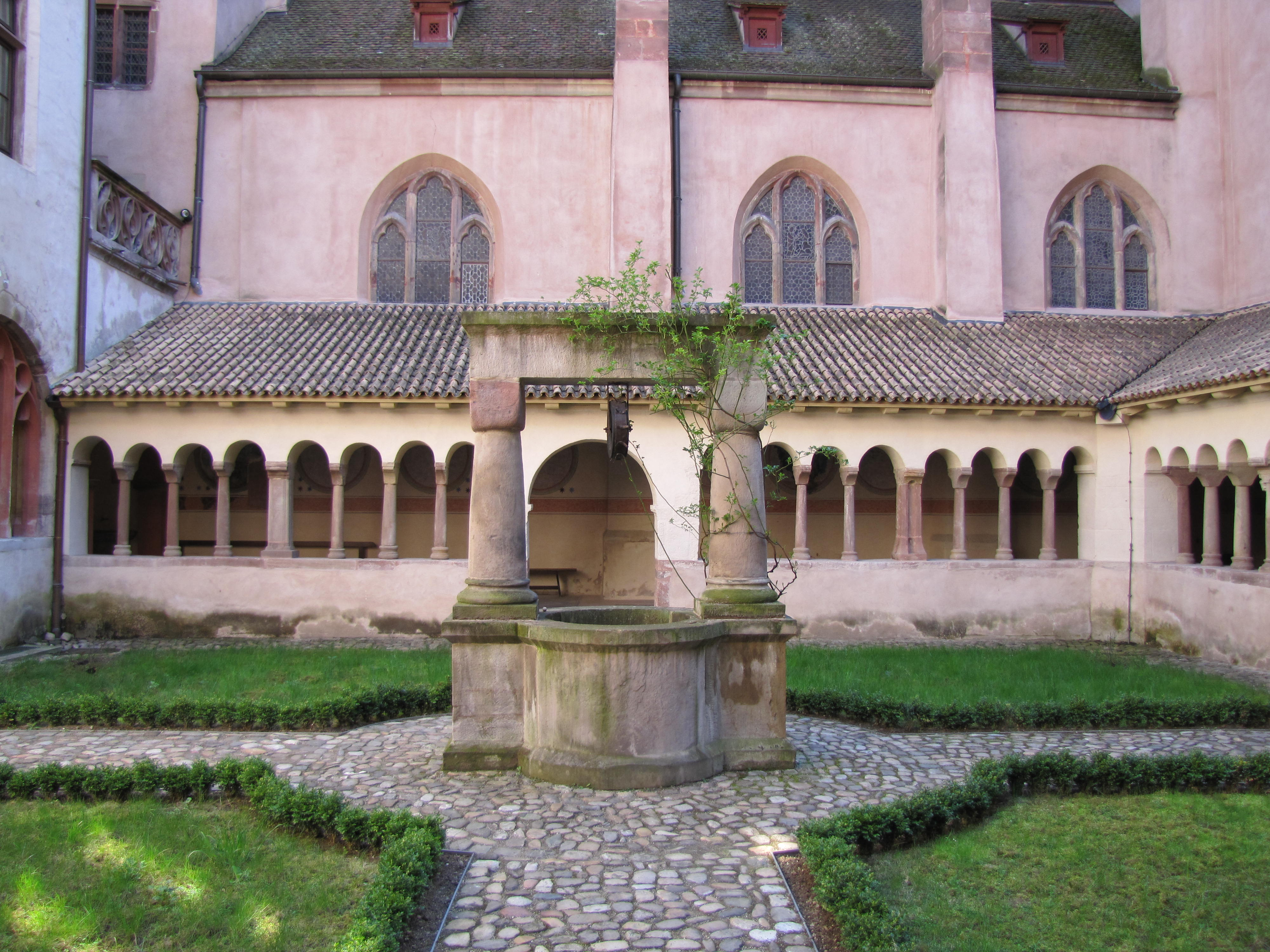
The cloister

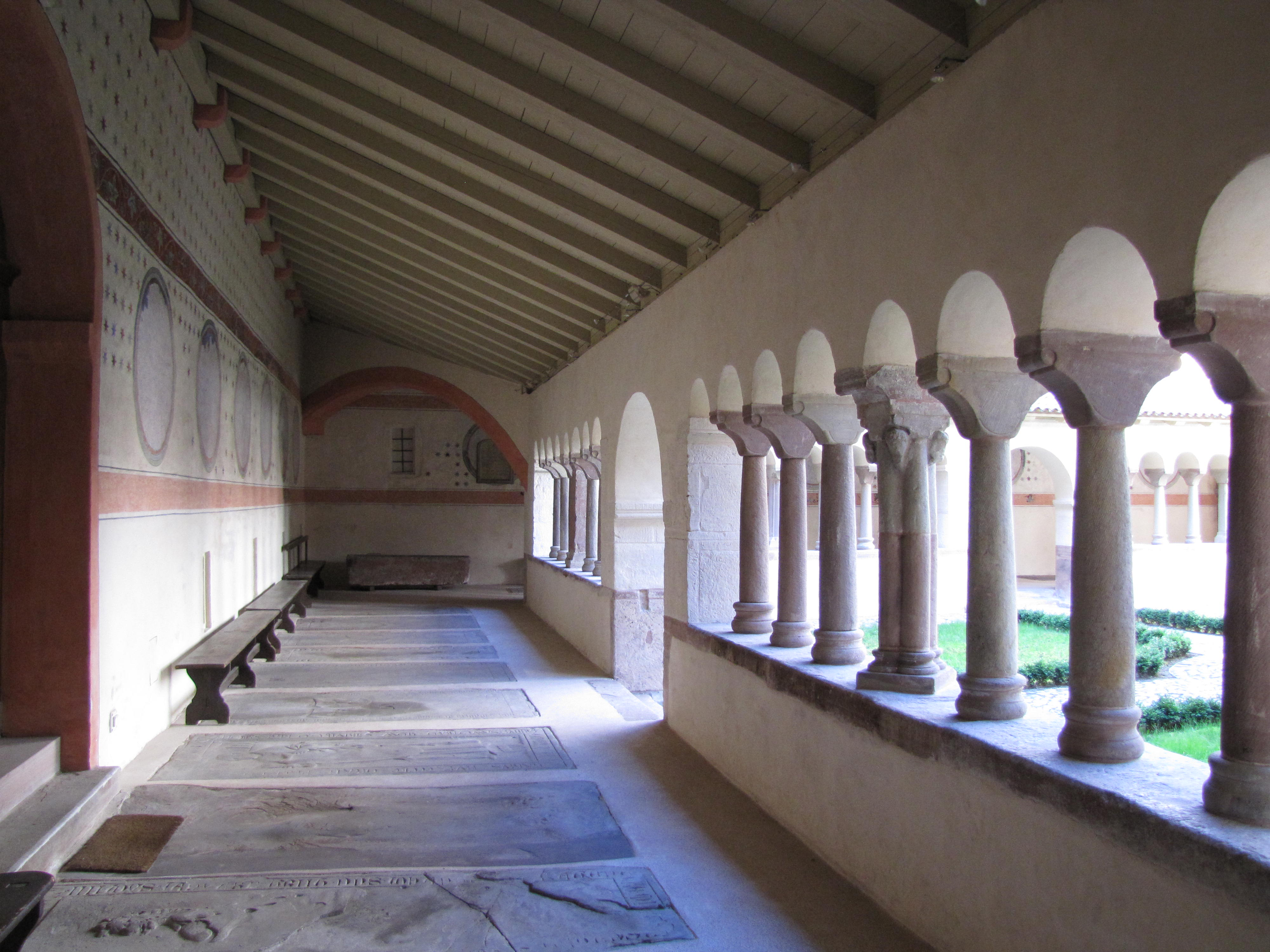
Inside the cloister
