= National Theatre of Strasbourg =

Coordinates: 48°35′11″N 7°45′19″E

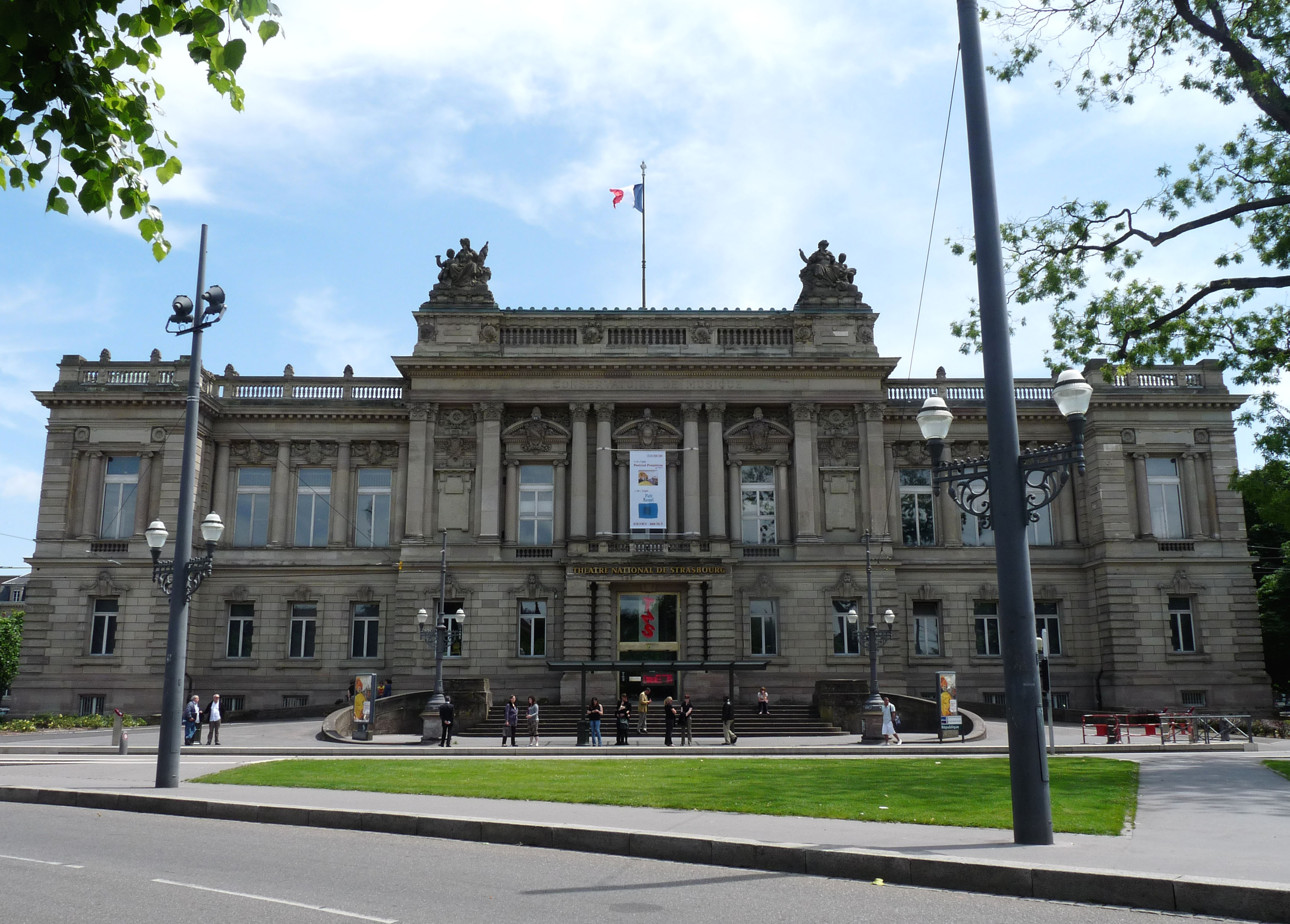
Front on the Place de la République

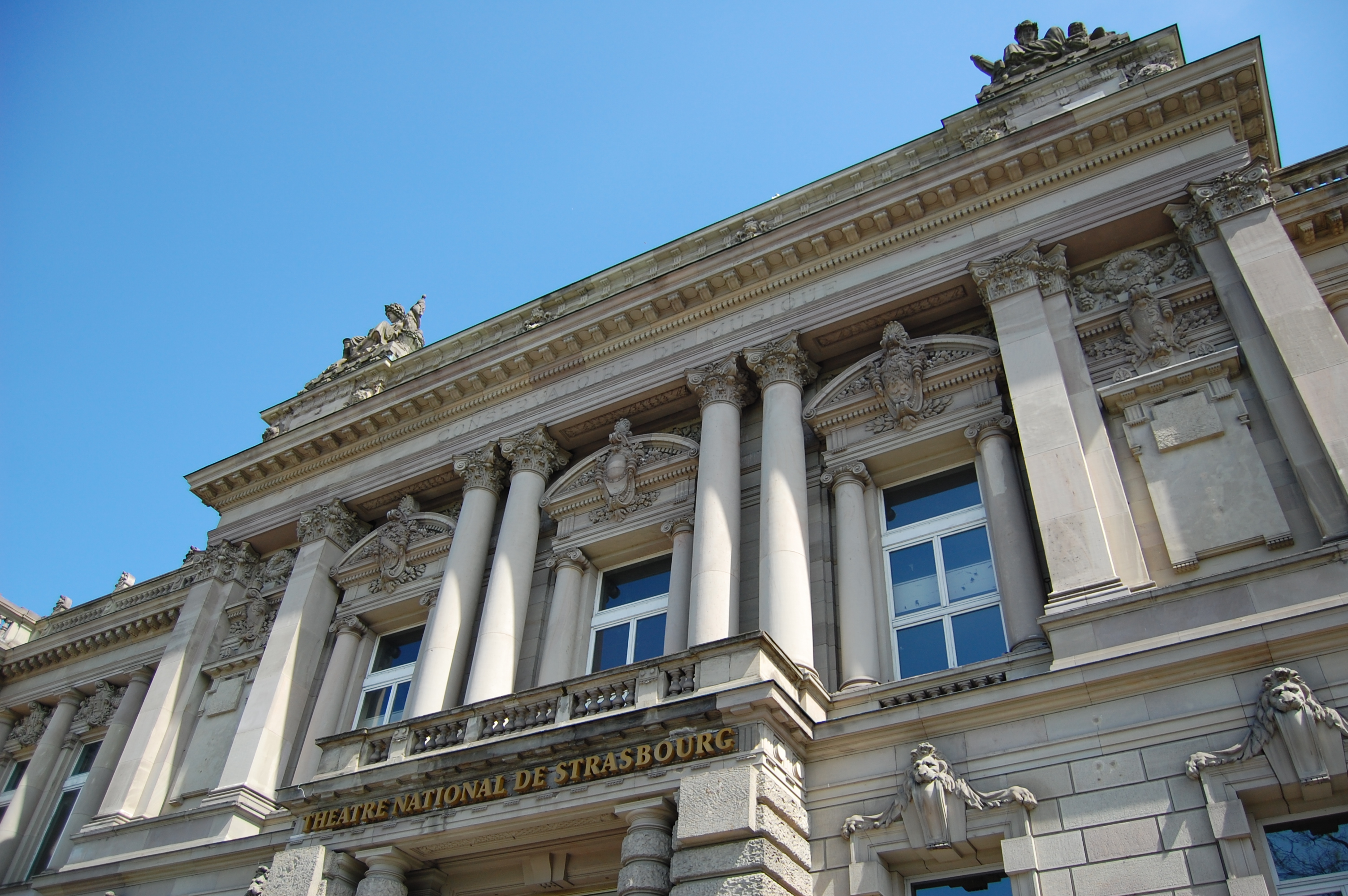
Close-up of the façade

The National Theatre of Strasbourg (French: Théâtre national de Strasbourg, pronounced [teɑtʁ nɑsjɔnal də stʁasbuʁ]; TNS) is a palace building on Strasbourg's Place de la République, now occupied by a theatre company of the same name, the National Theatre of Strasbourg.

The TNS was originally built to house the legislative assembly of the regional parliament of Alsace-Lorraine, after the area came under German control with the Treaty of Frankfurt (1871). It was built between 1888 and 1889 in neo-Renaissance style by the architect partners August Hartel and Skjold Neckelmann.

== History ==
In 1919, when Alsace-Lorraine returned to France, the French Government offered the building to the city of Strasbourg, which in turn offered it to the Strasbourg music conservatory, at the behest of its new director Guy Ropartz, who was refusing to occupy the Palais du Rhin opposite.

On 25 September 1944, the east wing of the building that contained the Chamber of the Assembly was destroyed by American bombing. It was reconstructed between 1950 and 1957, this time with a theatre auditorium replacing the assembly chamber. Michel Saint-Denis, the director of the National Theatre of Strasbourg at the time, entrusted this work to the architect Pierre Sonrel, who had recently worked with him in London restoring The Old Vic, which itself had been badly damaged by wartime bombing.

In 1995, the façade, roofing, and the entrance on Place de la République were classified as a monument historique.

=== Conservatory ===
In 1922, the Conservatory of Strasbourg (founded in 1855, the same year as the Orchestre philharmonique) was moved into the upper part of the building and several teaching rooms were built in as well as a concert hall. In 1995, the building wasn't deemed suitable enough for teaching music any more and the conservatory had to move out; it was subsequently relocated in the Cité de la musique et de la danse, a state-of-the-art building inaugurated in 2006. The concert hall has remained unused since. In 2016, the monumental pipe organ, a 1963 work by organ builder Curt Schwenkedel, was restored and moved into Saint Stephen’s Church, where it started a new life as a church organ instead of a concert organ.

== Seating capacities ==
The Hartel and Neckelmann building houses two rooms: the salle Bernard-Marie Koltès (470 or 600 seats) and the salle Hubert Gignoux (a 200-seat modular room). Two other theater rooms (120 and 250 seats, respectively) used by the TNS are located in Espace Klaus Michael Grüber in rue Jacques Kablé.
