= August Hartel =

German architect

August Hartel (26 February 1844 – 18 February 1890) was a German architect.

Born in Cologne, Hartel was a student and later an employee of Franz Schmitz (architect). Together with Theodor Quester, he operated an office in Krefeld, which planned in 1877 the Christuskirche, Bochum in Gothic Revival style. He died a few months after his appointment as Baumeister of the cathedral in Strasbourg.
