= Old Saint Peter's Church, Strasbourg =

Catholic and Lutheran church building in Strasbourg, Alsace, France

Coordinates: 48°34′58″N 7°44′24″E

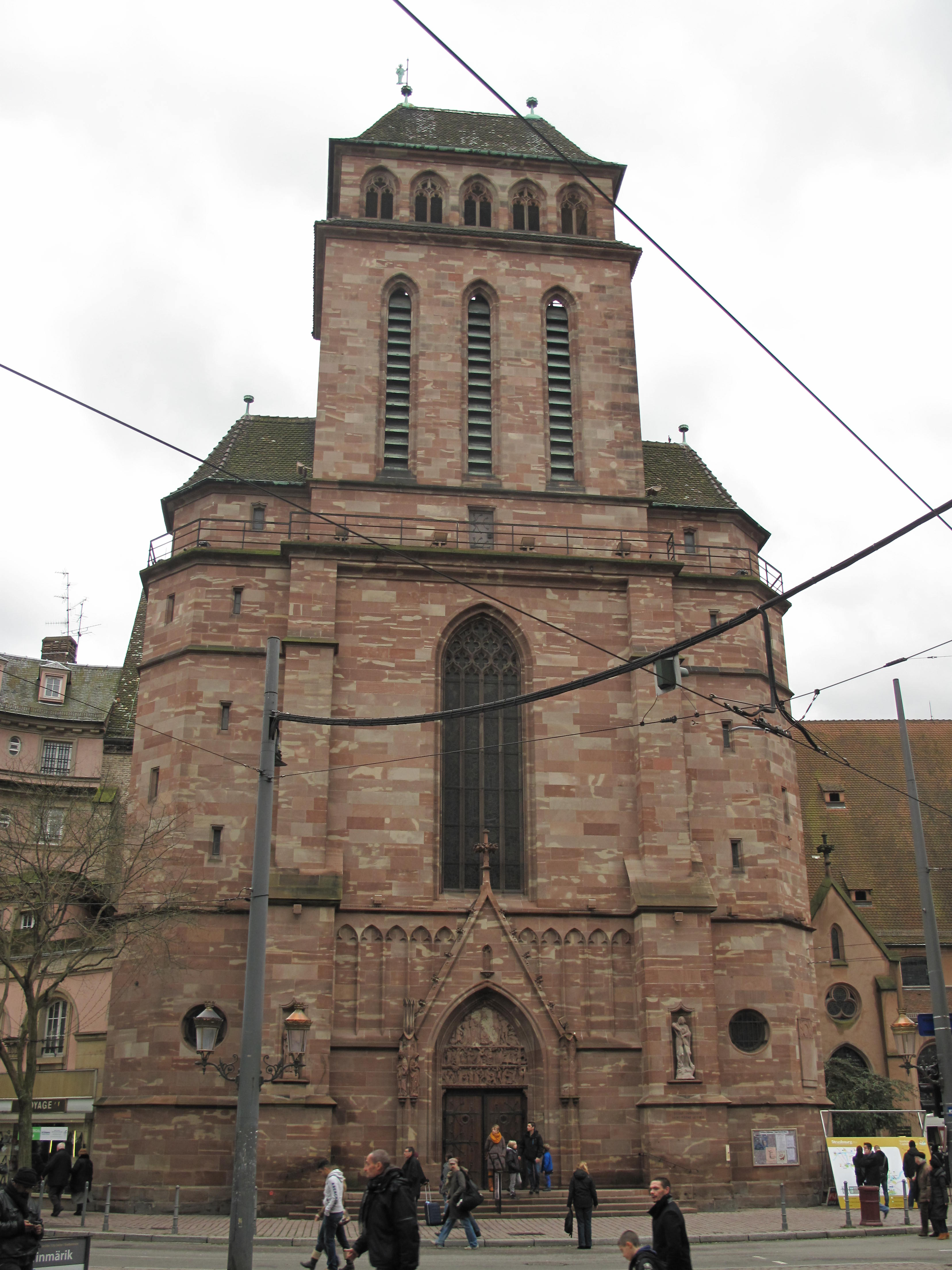
Façade of Catholic church

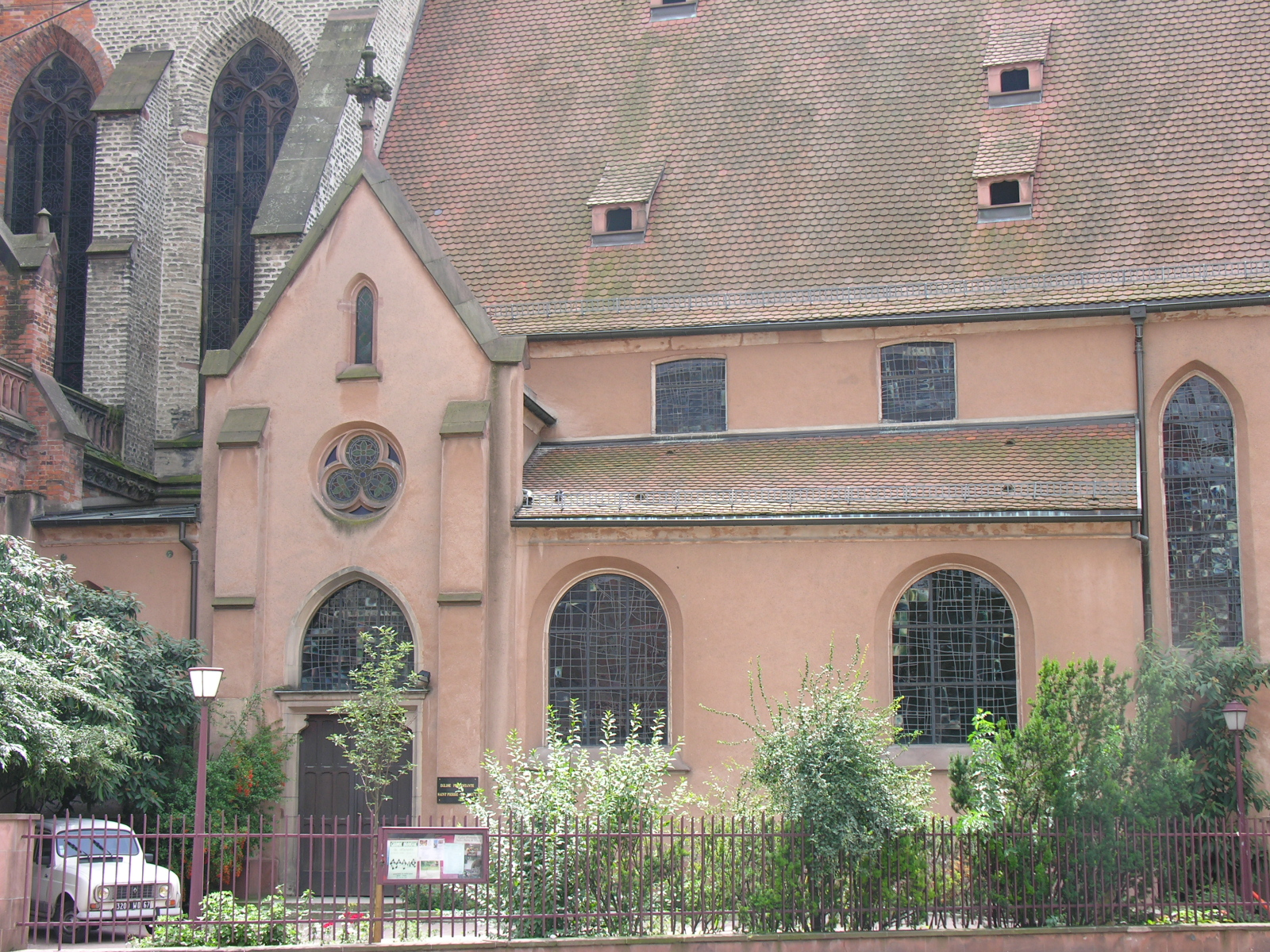
Entrance to Protestant church

The Church of Old Saint Peters (French: Église Saint-Pierre le Vieux) is a by simultaneum Catholic and Lutheran church building in Strasbourg, Alsace is first mentioned in 1130.

In the Middle Ages it was one of Diocese of Strasbourg's nine parish churches.

On 22 May 1398 the chapter of the Abbey of Honau, which had been in Rhinau since 1290, moved to Old St Peter's because of flooding in Rhinau. The chapter stayed there until 1529, conducting its services in the choir, while the parish occupied the nave. When the Catholic rite was restored in 1683, the chapter returned to the church and stayed there until 1790, when it was wound up.

On 20 February 1529, when Strasbourg openly joined the Reformation and suspended the practice of the Mass, the church became Lutheran. Martin Bucer and the other Strasbourg reformers had campaigned for several years to have Protestant services in all of Strasbourg's churches, but in 1525 the city council had voted to retain the mass in several churches, including Old St Peter's.

In 1535, in the context of the Reform, a Latin school, or 'Middle school' was opened at Old Saint Peters.

In 1683, two years after the annexation of Strasbourg by France, Louis XIV ordered that part of the church be returned to the Catholics and that a wall be constructed inside the church by the rood screen, to restrict the Protestant services to the nave. It was not until 2012 that a door was opened in this dividing wall.

In the 19th century, the Catholic part of the church was extended. The extension was designed by the architect Conrath and opened in 1867. The 1762 pipe organ of the Catholic part was moved to the Church of Saint Maurice in Soultz-les-Bains in 1865.

The Catholic Church contains relics of Brigit of Kildare as well as a number of important works of art classified as Monuments historiques such as the "Passion of Christ", a series of ten Gothic paintings by Heinrich (or Henri) Lutzelmann (1485), the "Scenes from the Life of St Peter" an (incomplete) series of four wooden early Renaissance or late Gothic reliefs made around 1500 and a series of four 1504 paintings depicting "Scenes of the Life of Christ after the Resurrection".

The Lutheran part of the church, presently owned and used by a congregation within the Protestant Church of Augsburg Confession of Alsace and Lorraine, also features some notable works of art, among which the wooden Renaissance relief "Holy Family" (1520s) by Hans Wydyz, classified as a Monument historique.

== Galleries ==
Views of the Catholic Church

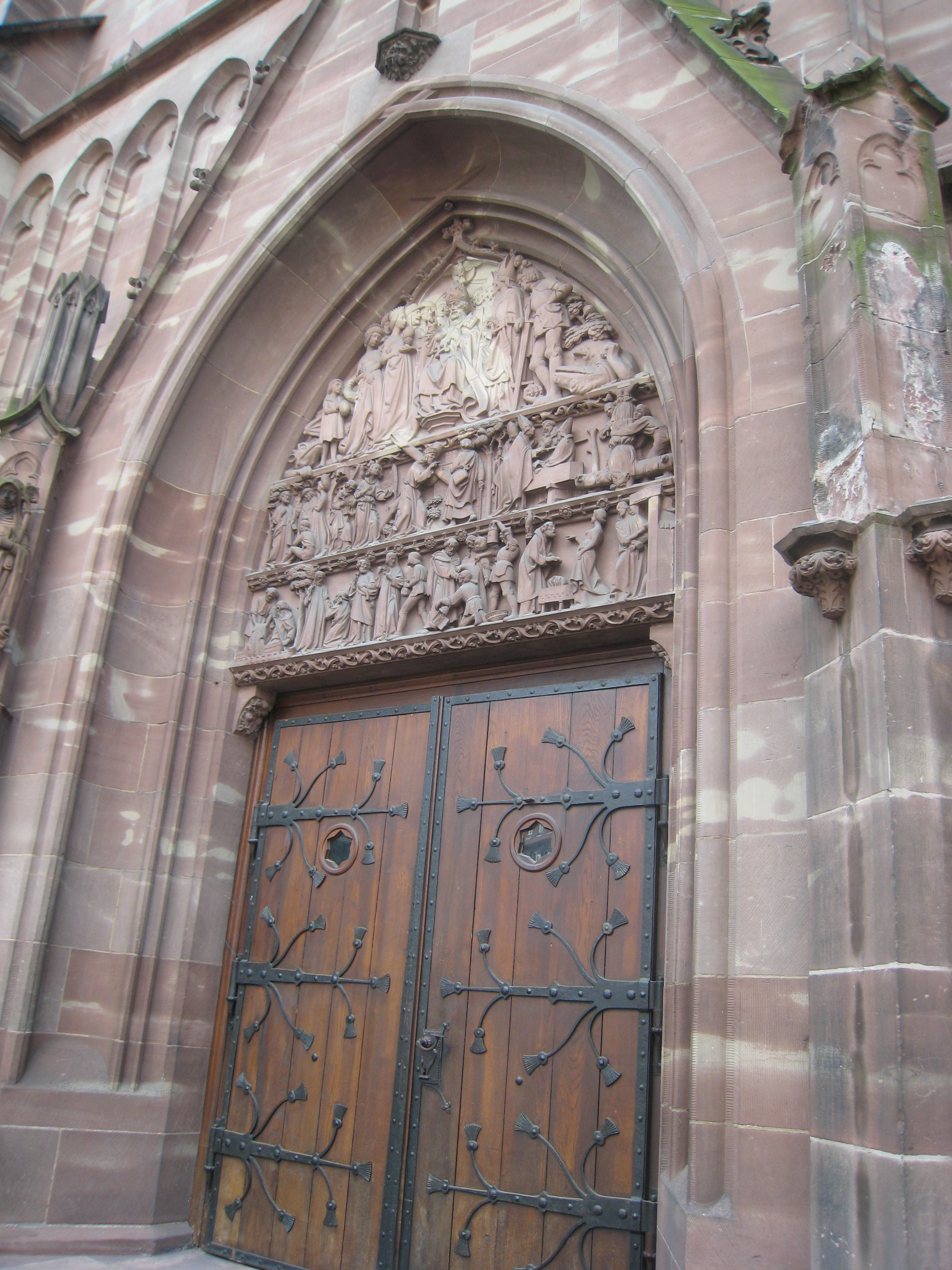
Portal

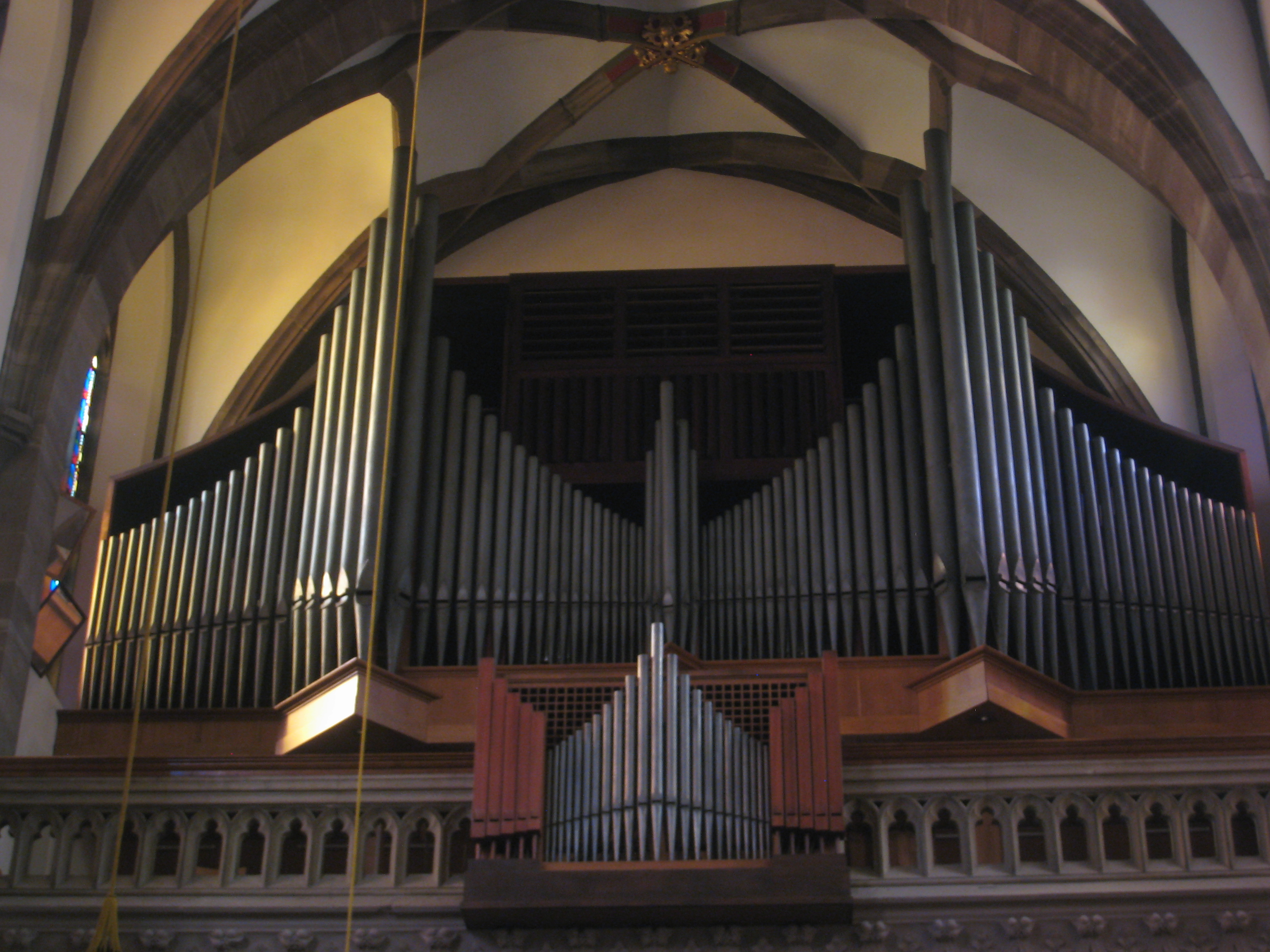
Pipe organ

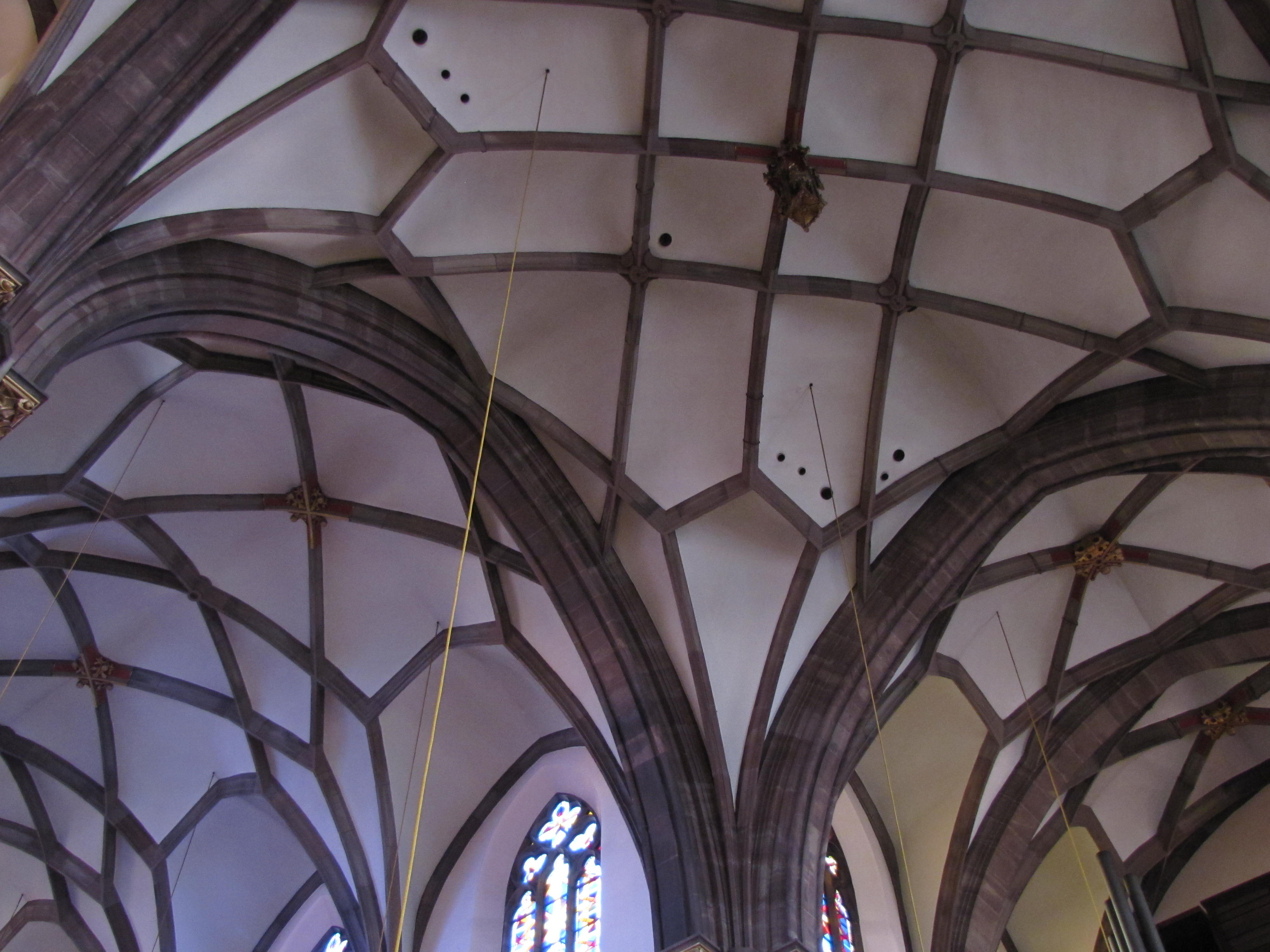
Vaults

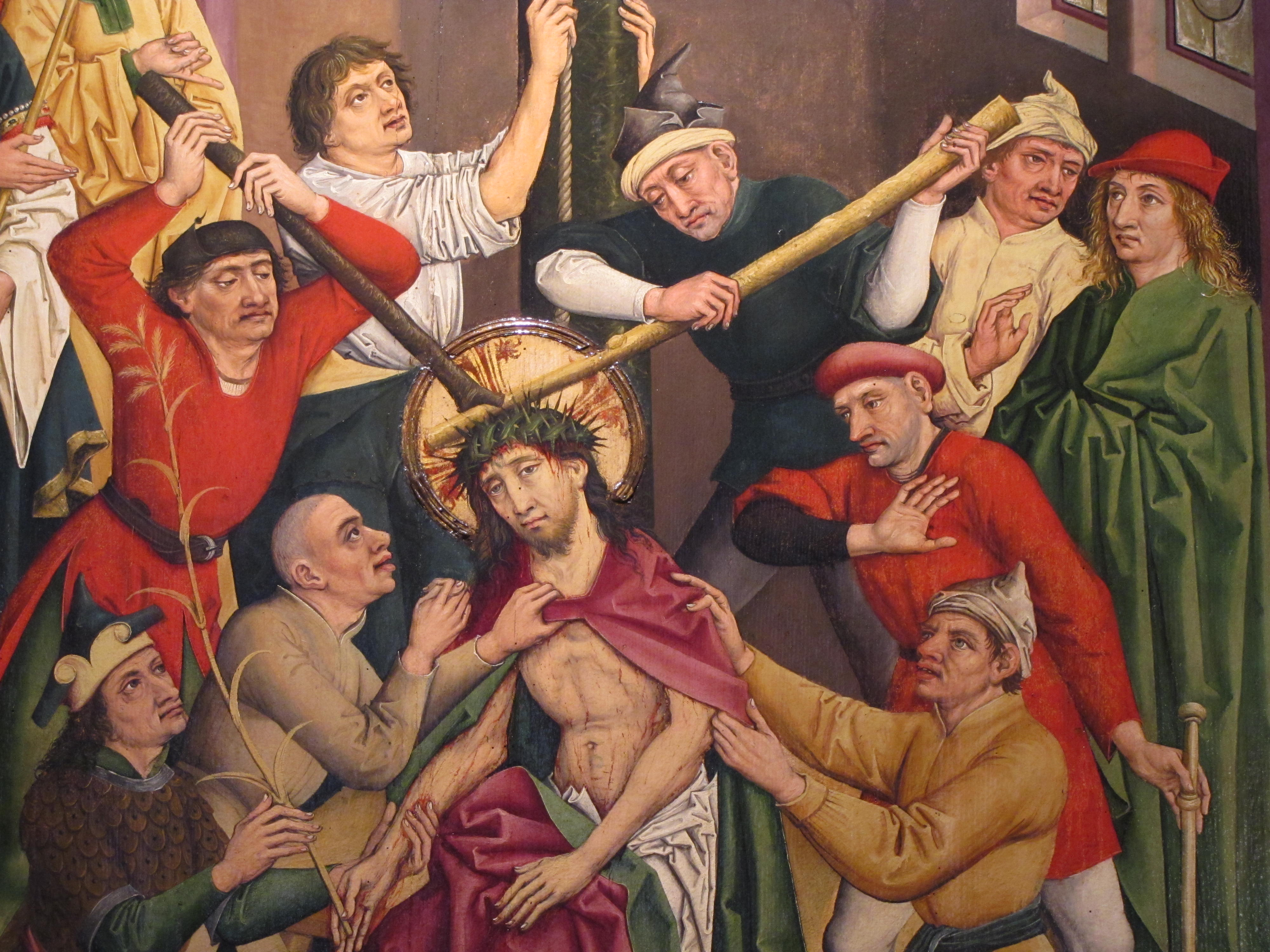
"The Passion of Christ" (detail of a panel)

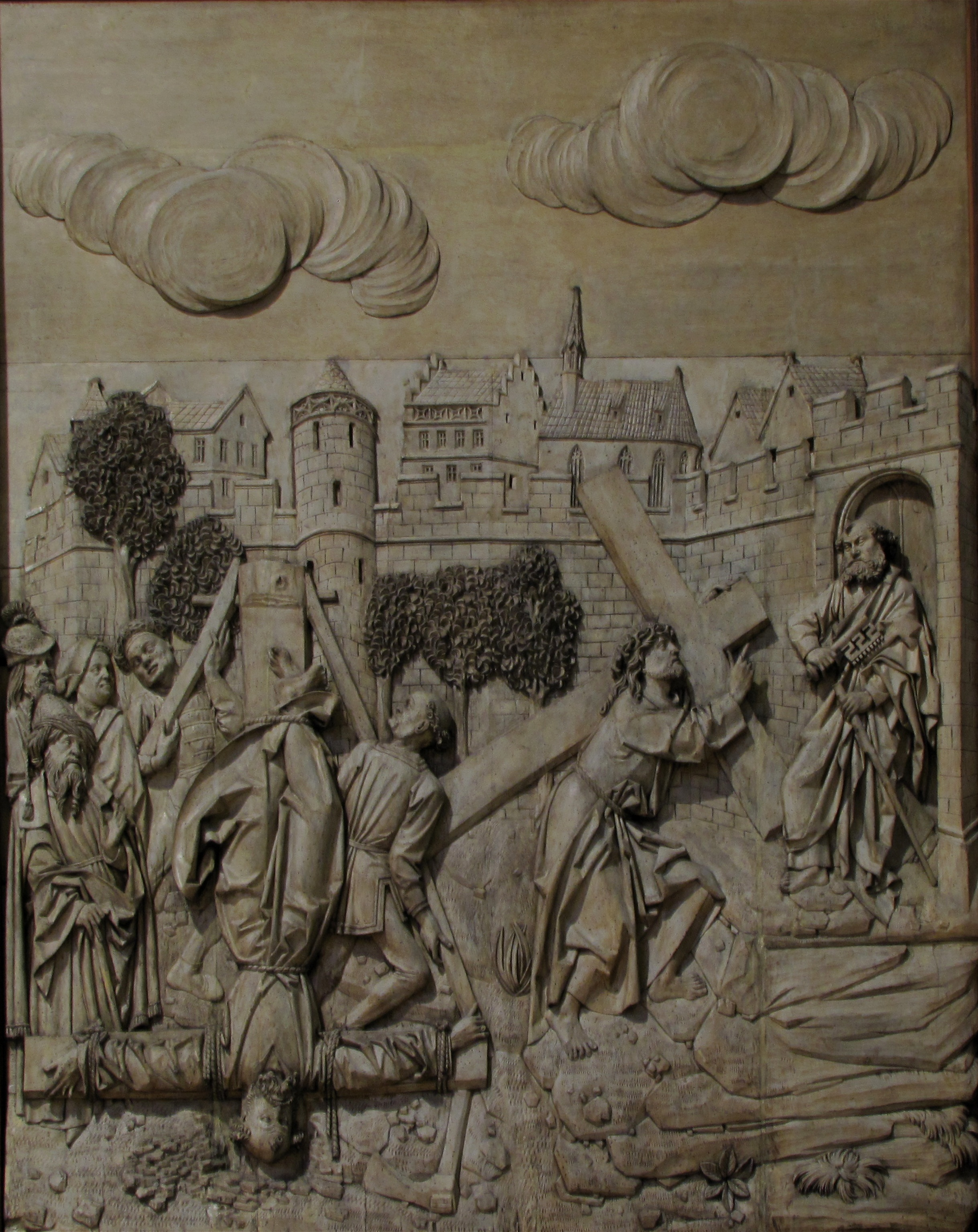
"Scenes from the Life of St Peter" (detail of a panel)
Views of the Protestant Church

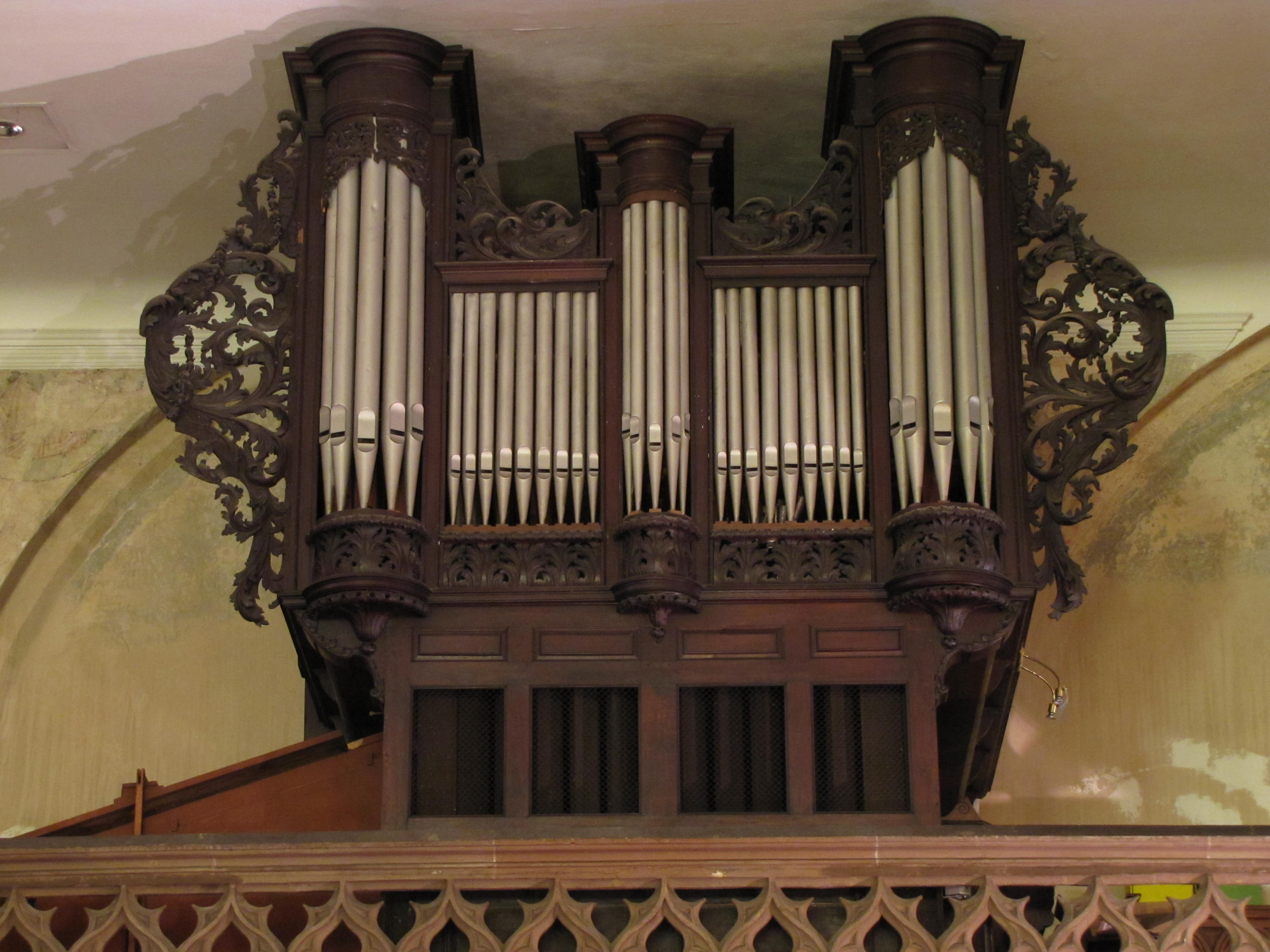
Pipe organ

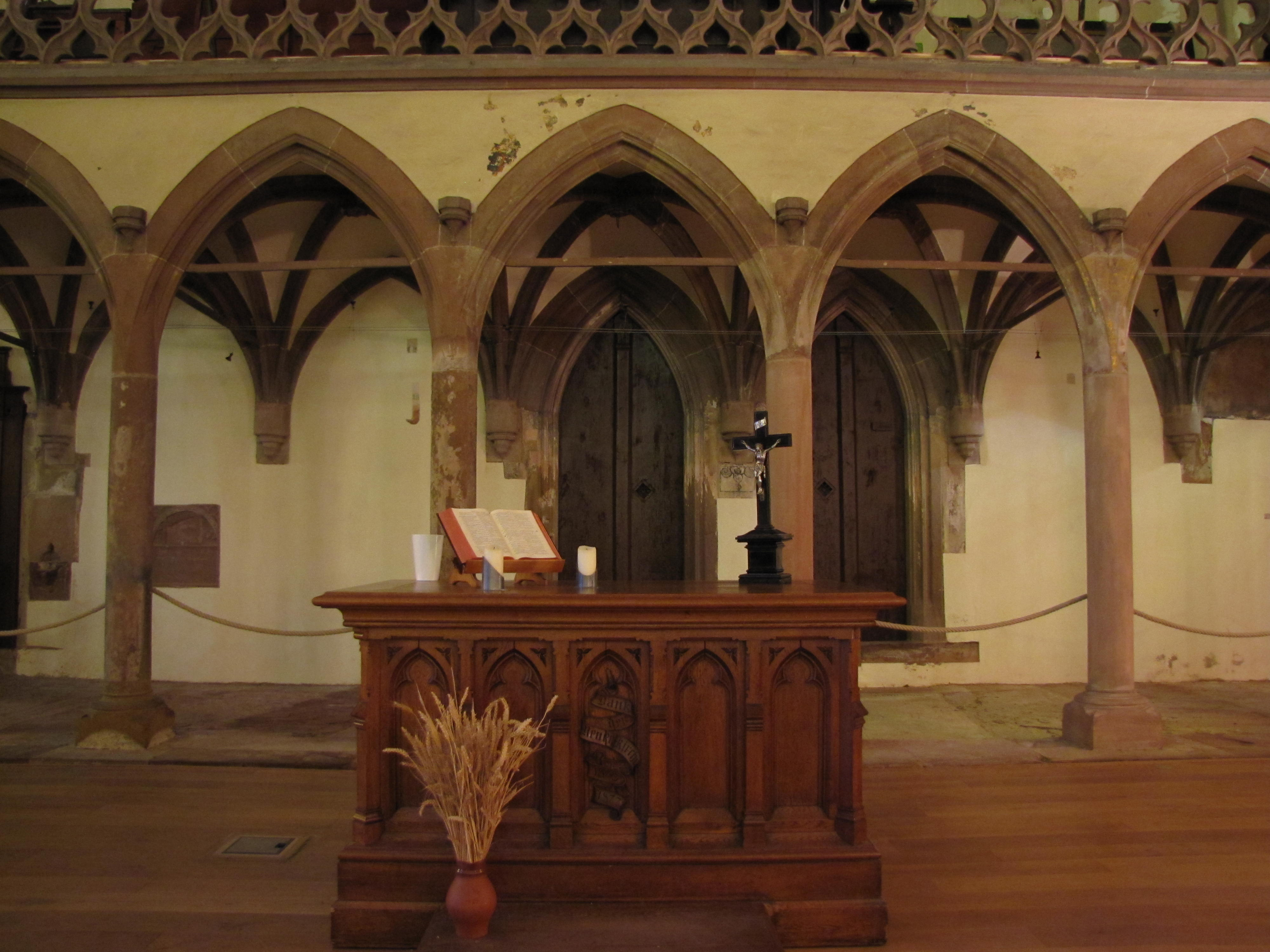
Altar

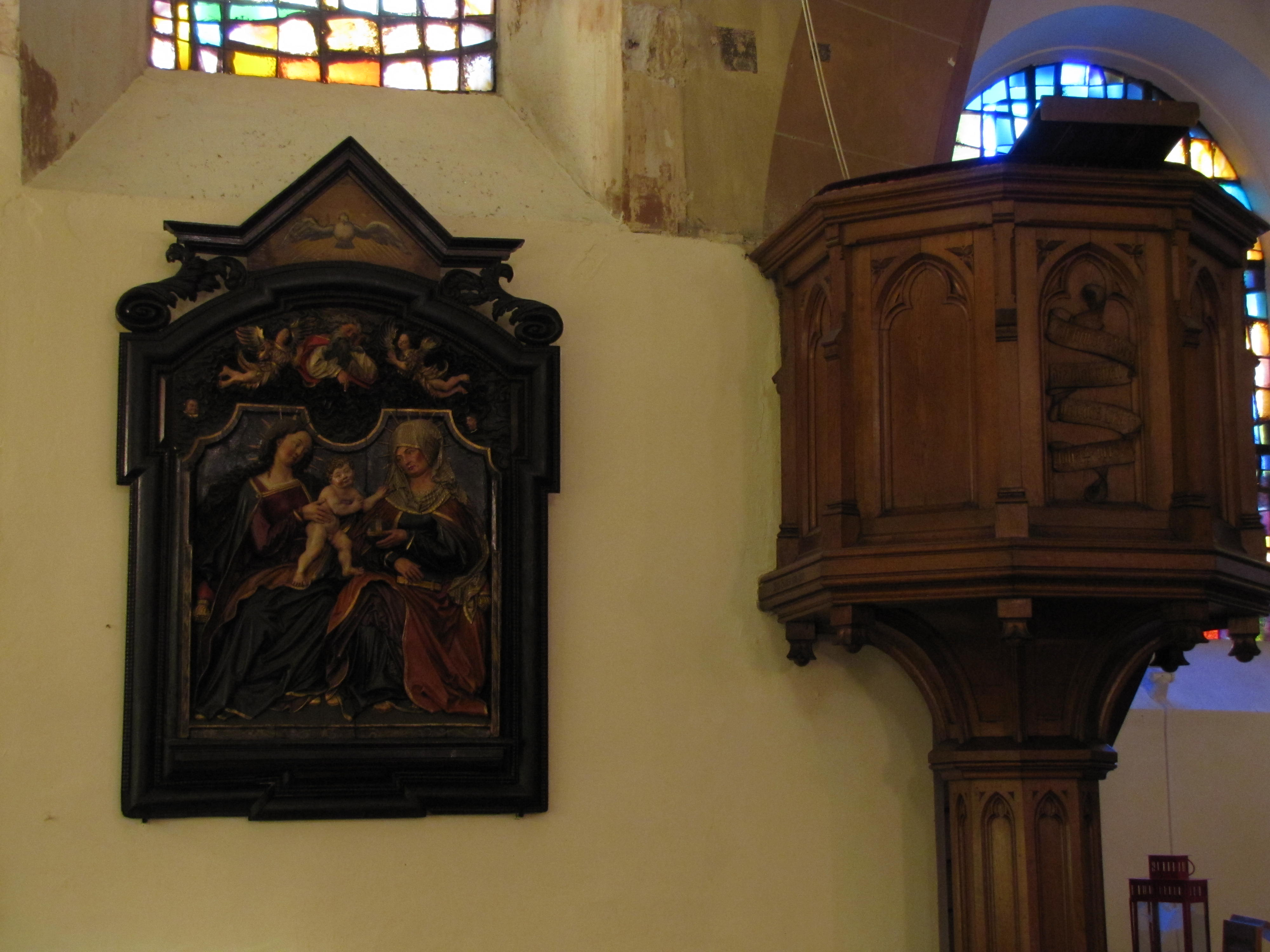
Chancel and relief "Holy Family"

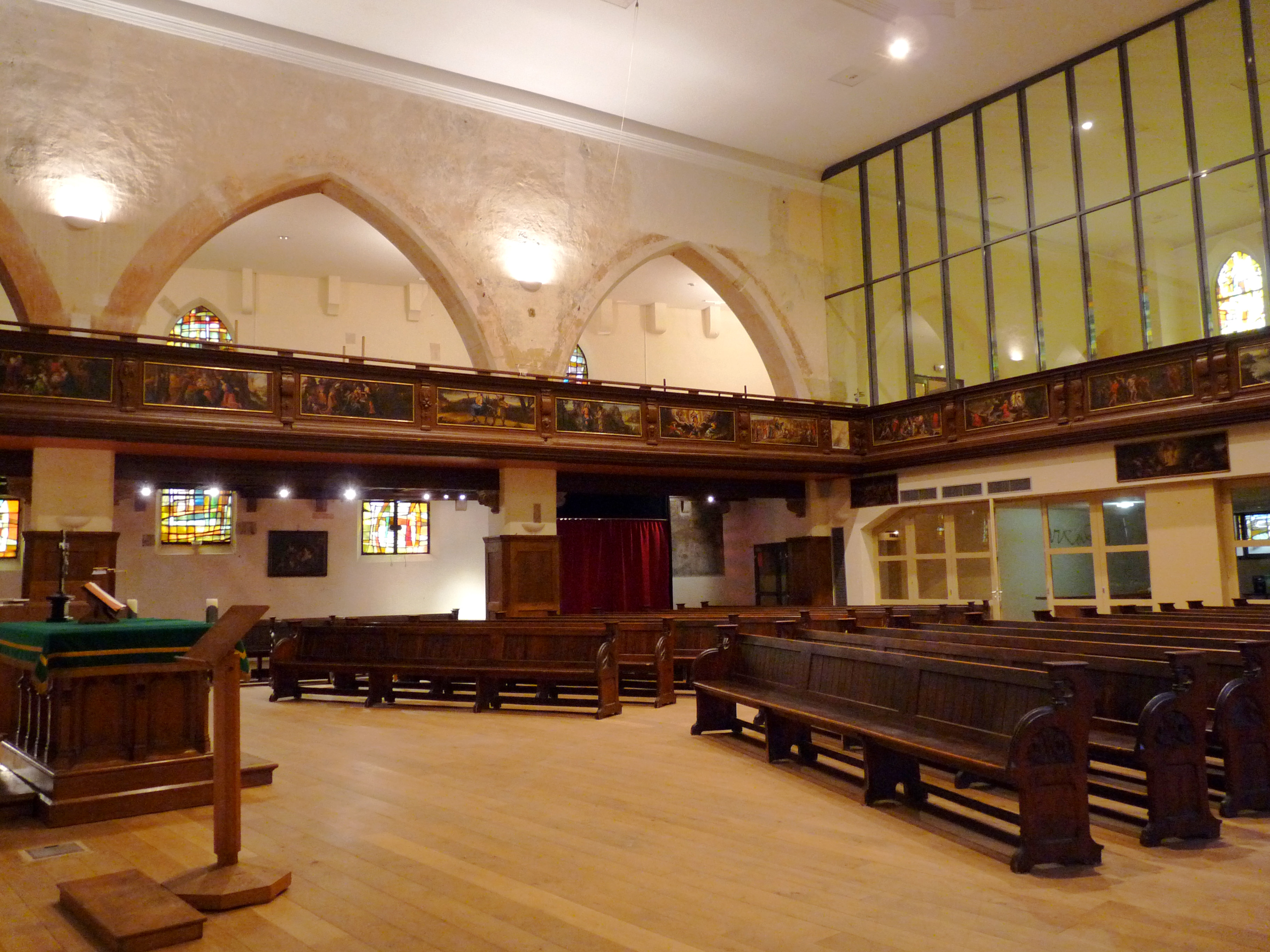
The gallery

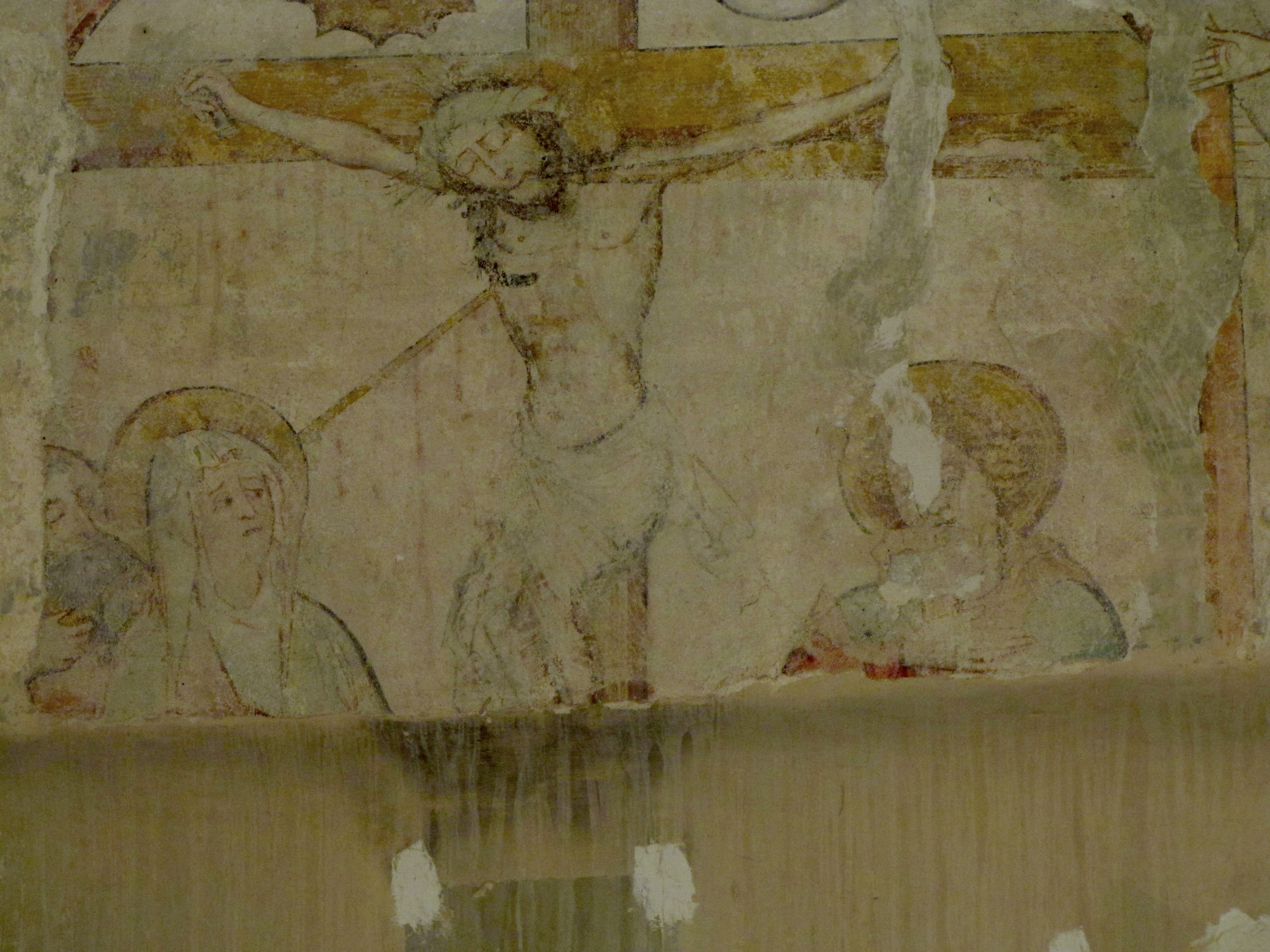
Fresco
