= Sainte-Madeleine, Strasbourg =

Church in Strasbourg, France

Coordinates: 48°34′48″N 7°45′17″E

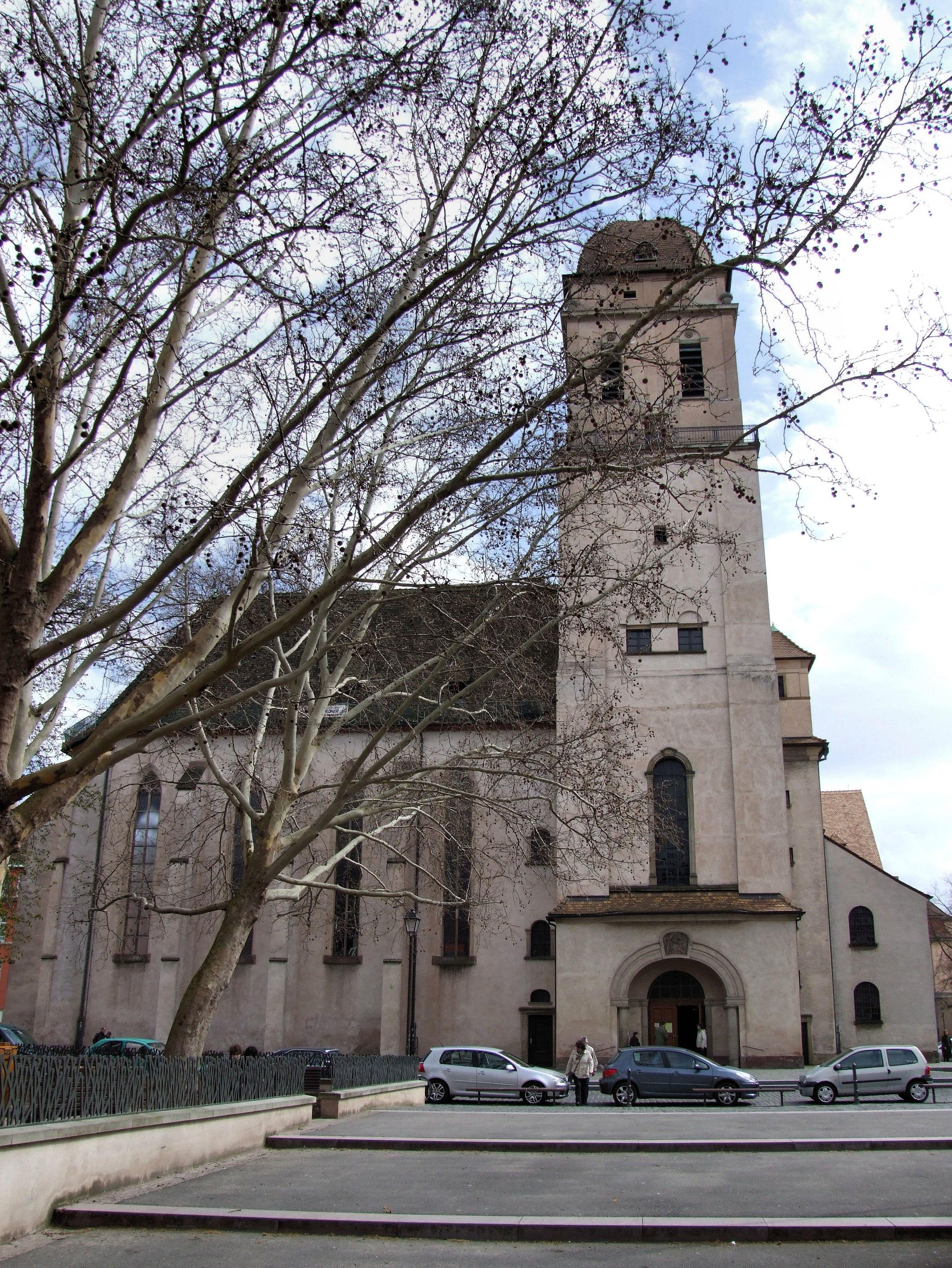
Main façade of Sainte-Madeleine Church

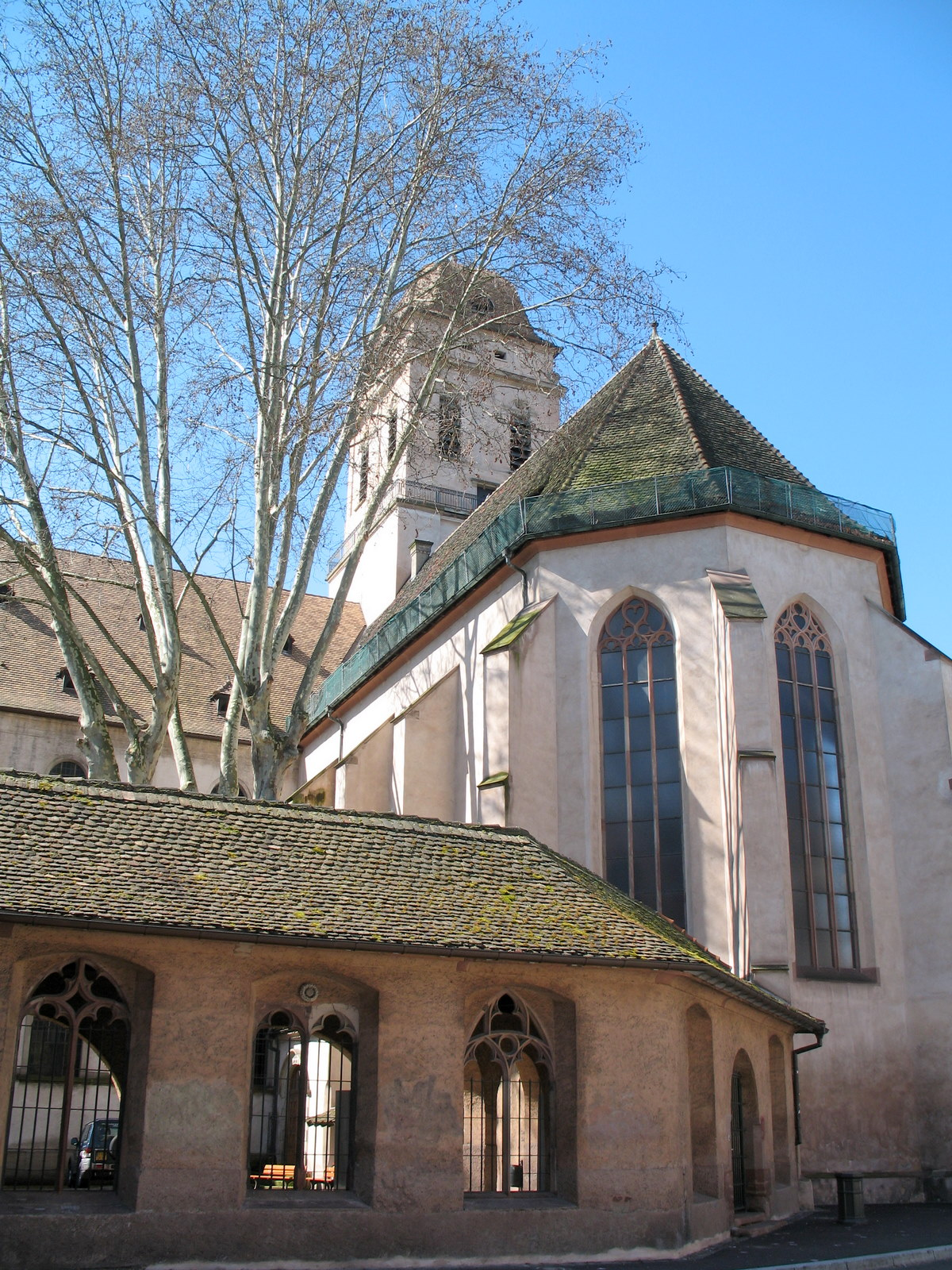
Gothic parts (cloister and side chapel) of Sainte-Madeleine Church

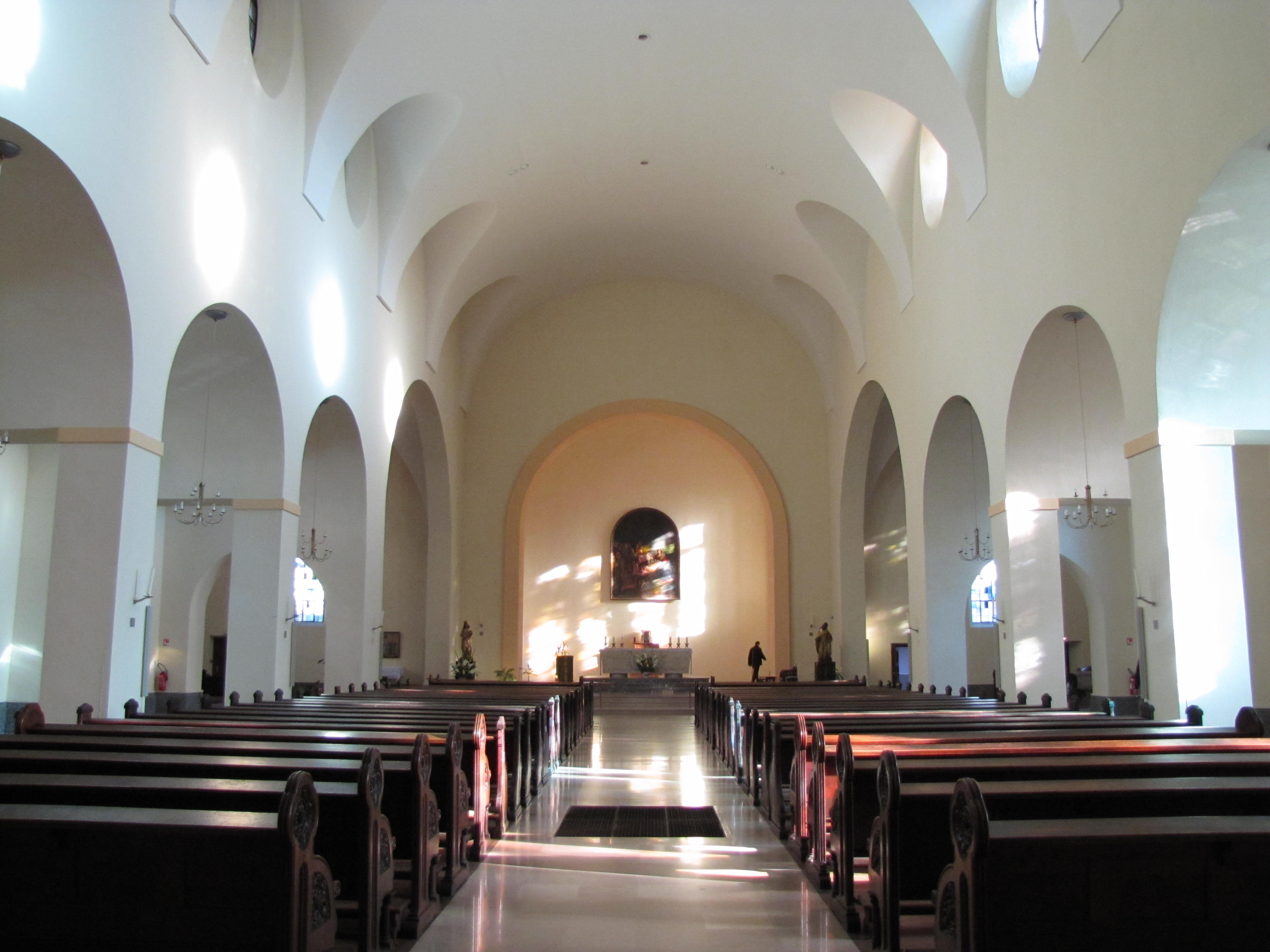
A view of the nave originally rebuilt by Fritz Beblo

The Sainte-Madeleine Church (French: Église Sainte-Madeleine [eɡliz sɛ̃t madlɛn]; German: Magdalenenkirche [makdaˈleːnənˌkɪʁçə]) is a Catholic church in Strasbourg, France, which was built in Gothic style in the late 15th century, but largely rebuilt in a style close to Jugendstil after a devastating fire in 1904. Destroyed again during World War II, the church was re-constructed in its modern form.

This is the fourth building dedicated to Mary Magdalene built in the city since the 13th century. The church is classified as a historic monument by a decree of 6 December 1898.

== History and architecture ==
The first convent dedicated to Mary Magdalene was built in 1225 on the outskirts of the city of Strasbourg, on the site of the current place de la République. The institution, which welcomed repentant prostitutes, was evacuated and then destroyed around 1470, since the city feared imminent invasion by the armies of the Duke of Burgundy.

A new convent was rebuilt in the Krutenau district. The Gothic church of the convent of the sisters of the order of St. Mary Magdalene (Ordo Sanctae Mariae of magdalenae poenitentia), completed in 1478, was destroyed by fire in 1904. All that remains of this church, the last Gothic structure built in Strasbourg, is the choir housing fragments of some frescoes. It now serves as a chapel, dedicated to the Blessed Sacrament. Remains of the once abundant stained glass windows vy Peter Hemmel of Andlau that decorated the church are shown in the Musée de l’Œuvre Notre-Dame. John Calvin had made sermons and directed services in that church .

The current church, which is perpendicular to the earlier building, was built in 1907 according to plans by Fritz Beblo and is more spacious and airy. It has a barrel vault, based on the model of St. Michael's Church, Munich, and a conspicuous belltower. Severely damaged by Anglo-American bombing on 11 August 1944, it was rebuilt, true to Beblo's original, in 1958.

A part of the former cloisters from the earlier convent can still be seen, surrounding the adjacent school building.

== Furniture ==
=== Pipe organs ===
An organ was purchased from Andreas Silbermann on 17 February 1716 and was completed in 1718. It had a manual and an echo – on a specific keyboard – and separate pedals. The instrument was sold in 1799 to the city of Lampertheim, before vanishing in 1876.

The church then owned a first Roethinger organ, which was destroyed during the bombing of 1944. It was then endowed with a second Roethinger organ, which was inaugurated by Michel Chapuis and Robert Pfrimmer on 28 November 1965. It was completely rebuilt by Michel Wolf of Manufacture d'orgues alsacienne in 1997 and 1998, but the harmonization was not modified. Work was done on the cabinet in 2004. The organ was then restored by the firm of Alfred et Daniel Kern, which replaced the keyboards.

The Gothic side chapel of the current 20th-century church, that used to serve as the choir of the medieval church, houses another much smaller organ. This instrument from 1719, built by Andreas Silbermann, was originally designed for Marmoutier Abbey and was installed in its current location in 2012. It is classified as a Monument historique since 1976.

=== Adoration of the Shepherds ===
The church choir's rear wall is adorned by a large painting (oil on canvas, 3.82 m (12.5 ft) high, 2.82 m (9 ft 3 in) wide) representing the Adoration of the Shepherds. This 18th-century work was initially displayed in Strasbourg Cathedral and moved into Sainte-Madeleine either after 1904 or 1944. It is classified as a Monument historique since 1980.

=== Stations of the Cross ===
Sainte-Madeleine owned a set of fifteen oil on canvas paintings by Joseph Melling, representing all the Stations of the Cross. Only four of these paintings had officially survived the fire of 1904, until a fifth surviving painting was rediscovered in 2017.

== Gallery ==
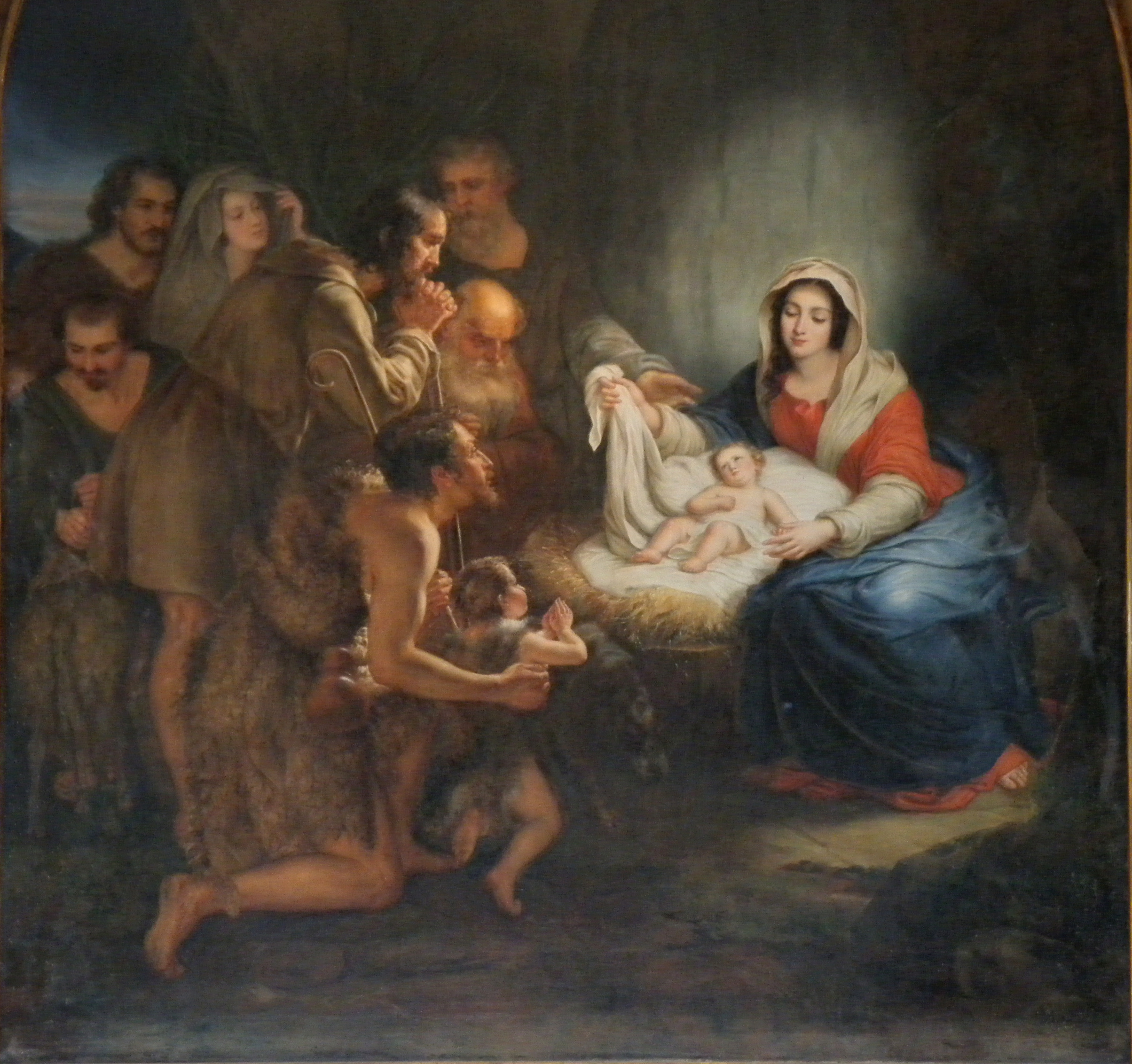
Adoration of the Shepherds (detail)

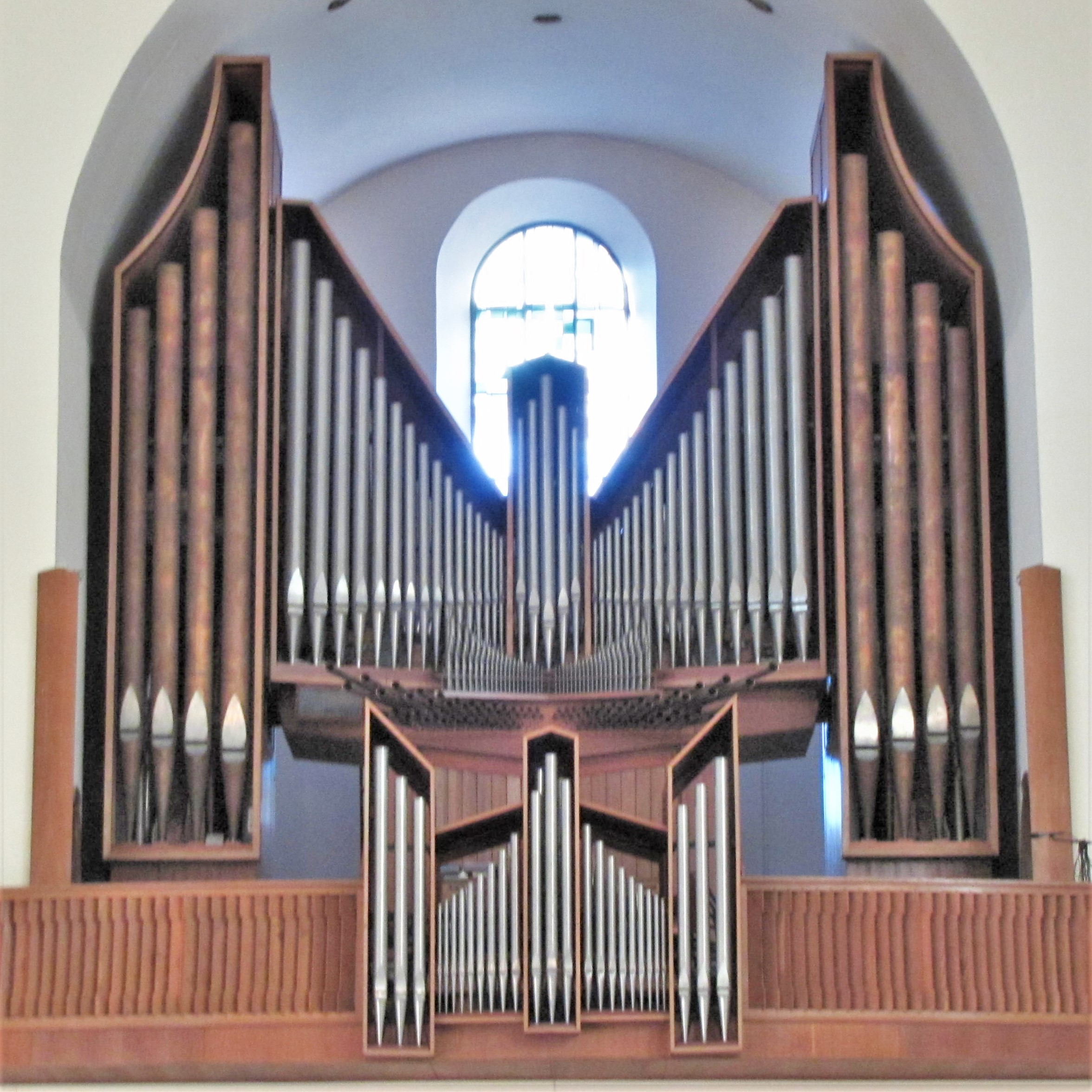
Main pipe organ from 1965

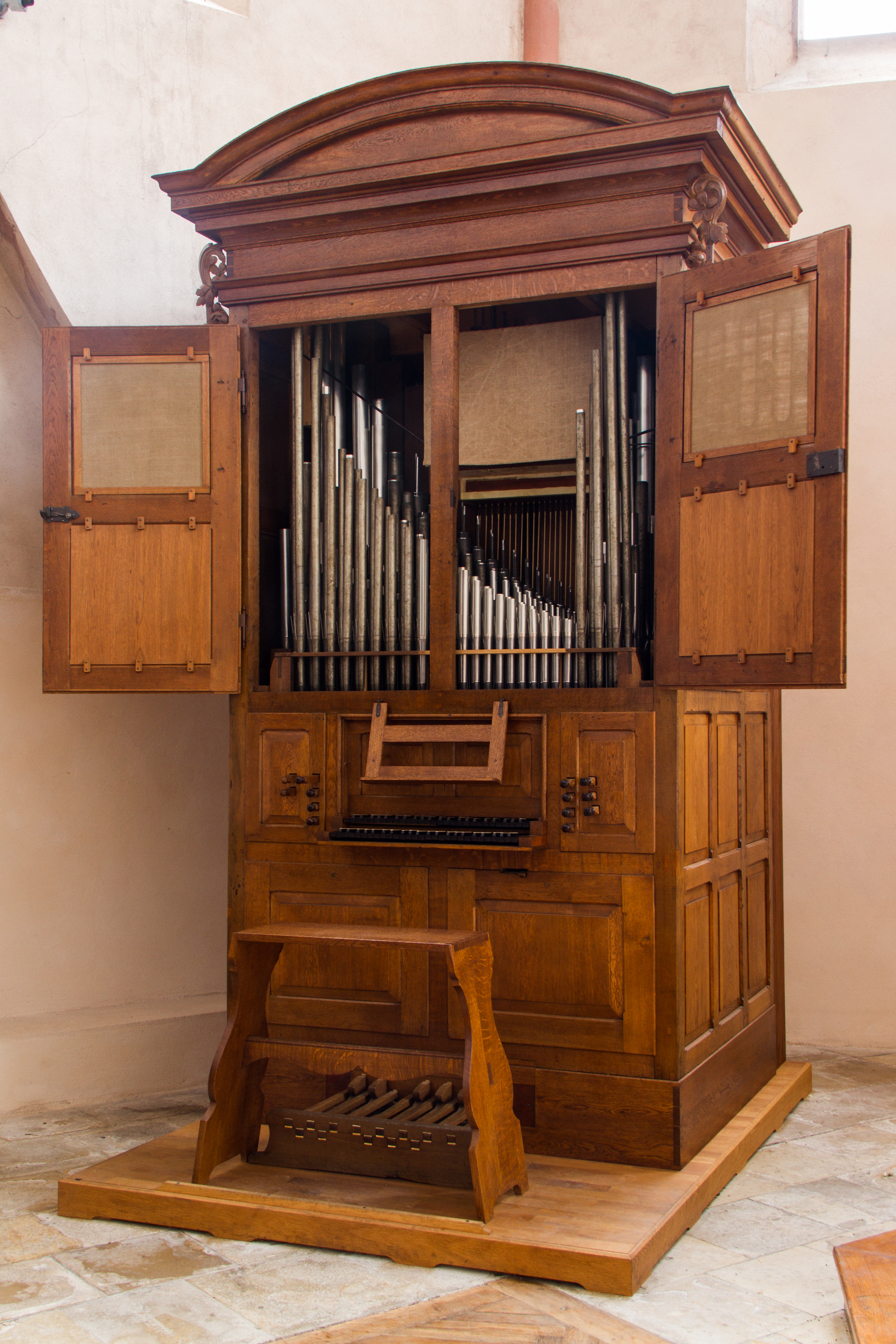
Side chapel pipe organ from 1719

== See also ==
- The Passion of Christ, a set of ten late 15th-century paintings originally displayed in the church.
