= Fritz Beblo =

German artist

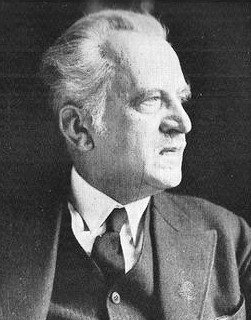
Fritz Beblo (c.1936)

Friedrich Karl Ewald Beblo (10 November 1872 – 11 April 1947) was a German city planner, architect and painter.

== Early life and education ==
He was born in Breslau. His father, Emil Beblo, was a secondary school teacher. Fritz was a class comrade of actor Friedrich Kayssler and author and poet Christian Morgenstern at the Maria-Magdalenen-Gymnasium in Breslau, where his father also taught. Fritz got his lifelong love of music from his father. His mother took particular care of Christian Morgenstern when he and her son became acquainted with each other. After leaving secondary school in 1883, Beblo first attended the Technische Hochschule Charlottenburg in Berlin. Here, he lived in close contact with his school friends Kayssler and Morgenstern. The three of them founded a cabaret and the regulars' table, Der Galgenberg (Gallows Hill). As one of the "gallows brothers", Beblo got the nickname of Stumme Hannes (Silent Hannes). (One of Morgenstern's best-known works is a collection of poems called Galgenlieder or "Gallows Songs".) Like the future actor, Friedrich Kayssler, Beblo maintained lifelong contact with his school friend from Breslau, Morgenstern.

In 1896, Beblo continued his studies at the Technischen Hochschule Karlsruhe with Professor Carl Schäfer, a renowned architect. His friendship with the painter Adolf Erbslöh is from this period. After finishing his studies in architecture, Beblo first went to the fortress Festung Ehrenbreitstein near Koblenz as the royal Prussian site manager and then to Traben-Trarbach on the Moselle River. There he participated in building the Moselle Bridge. After passing the examination for Baumeister (master builder) in 1902, he took over supervision of the building site for the new secondary school in Traben-Trarbach and built an adult education center (Volkshochschule) according to his own designs.

== 1903–1919 in Strasbourg ==
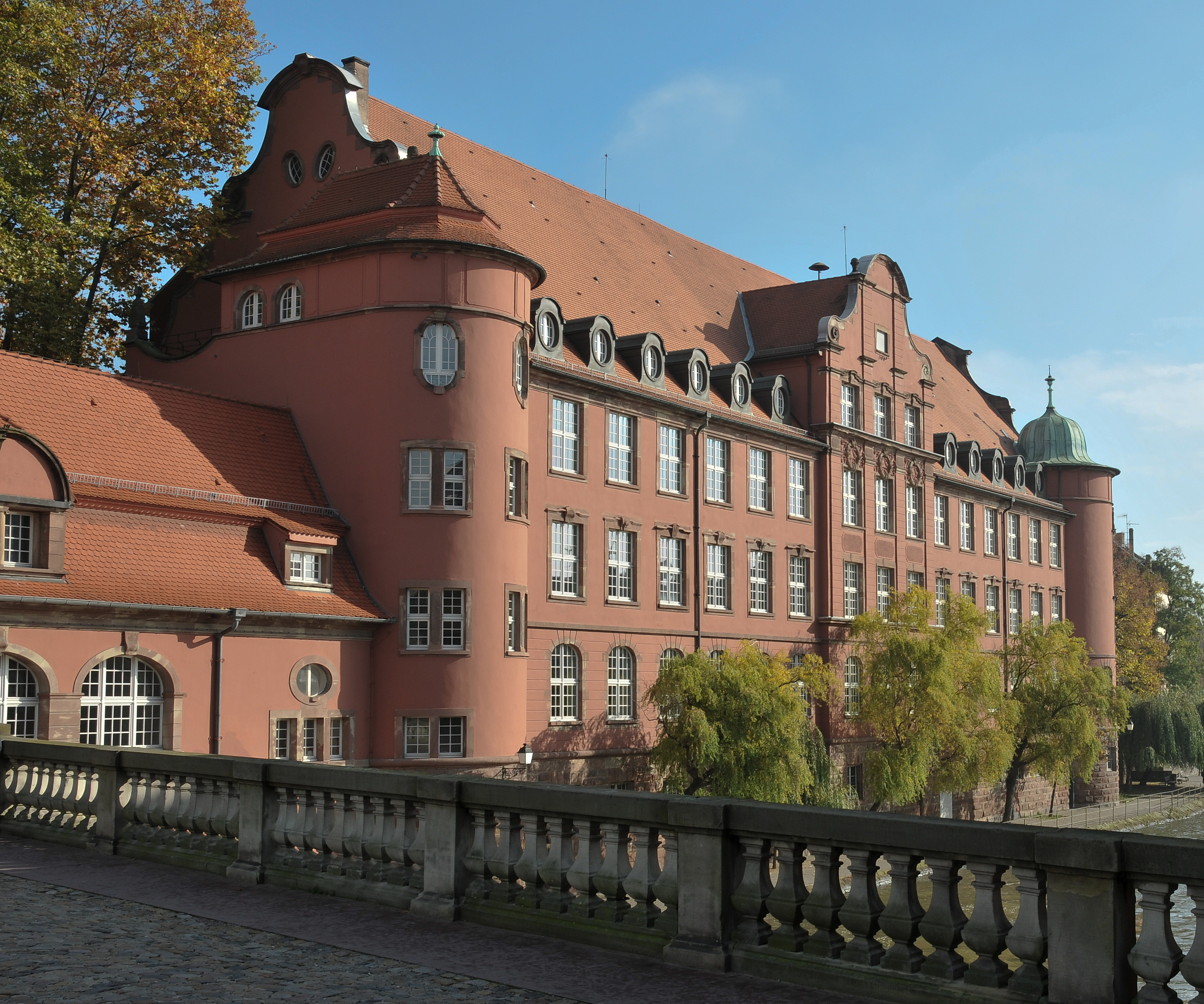
École Saint-Thomas in Strasbourg (built 1905–1907)

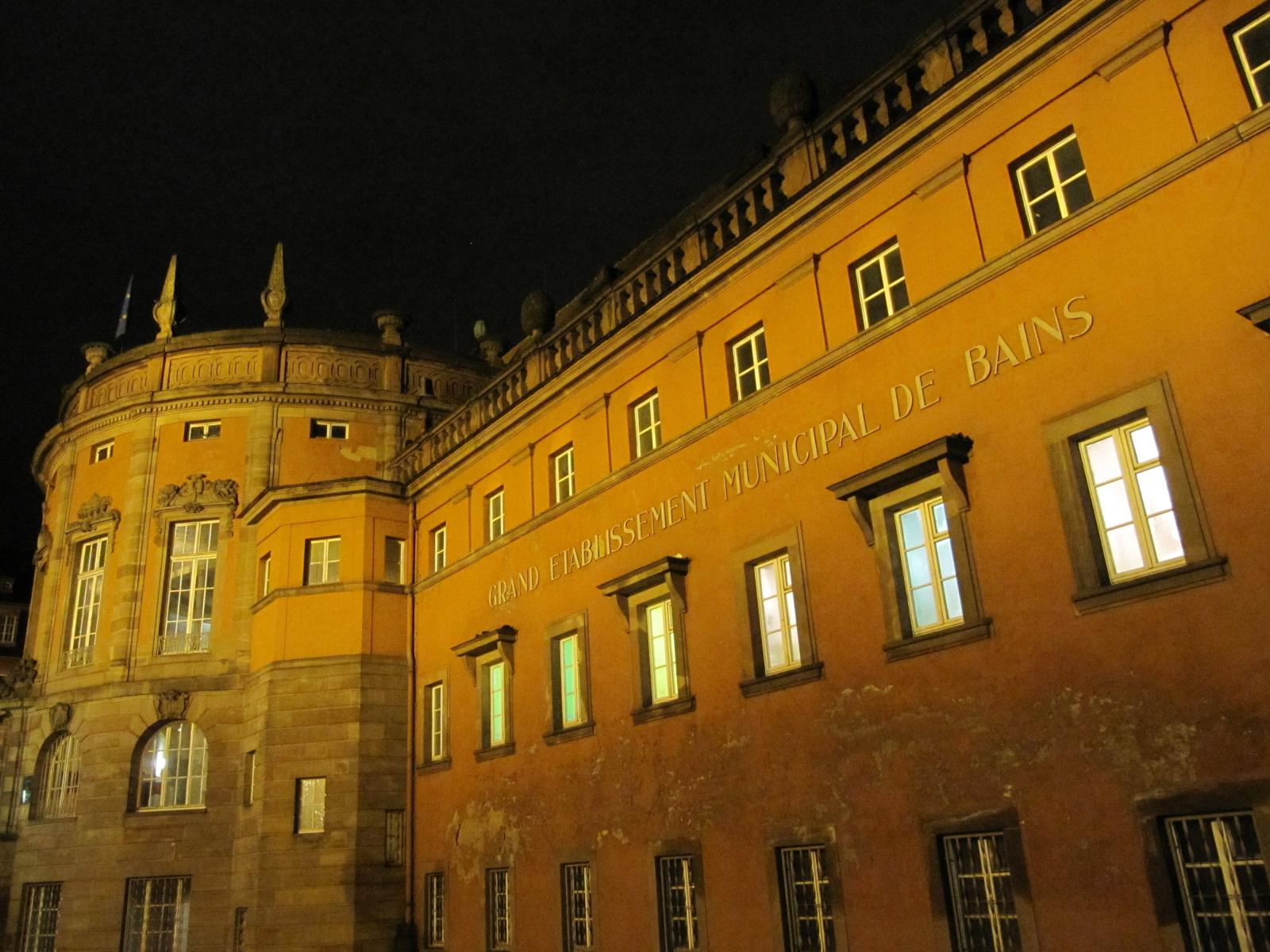
Bains municipaux (municipal baths) in Strasbourg (built 1904–1911)

Fritz Beblo began as a city building inspector in Strasbourg, which had belonged to the state of Elsass-Lothringen (Alsace-Lorraine) in the German Empire since 1871. At the beginning of the 20th century, Strasbourg was also in the midst of a lot of building activity (the Neustadt). In 1910, Fritz Beblo was named head of the building department and building control office (Baurat, building officer). He received support for his plans from Rudolf Schwander, the mayor. Beblo's name is especially connected with the Musau-Schule (1904–1906), the Thomasschule (1905–1907), the Neufeldschule (1907–1909, today the Collège Louise Weiss), the Haushaltsschule beside the Magdalenenkirche (1909–1910), the Magdalenenkirche, the Grande Percée (Neue Straße) and the swimming pool and thermal baths Bains Municipaux (1905–1910). This Art Nouveau style bath is considered one of his finest works and is protected as a historical monument. The last work of Beblo in Strasbourg that is worth mentioning is the grounds of the Nordfriedhof (Northern Cemetery). He was not able to complete this work, having to leave the city of Strasbourg after the end of the First World War, since he was a German official and the city had become French again.

== 1919–1936 in Munich ==
Beblo received offers from Aachen, Bonn and Munich. He decided to go to Munich, where he expected large tasks as the city building officer. Above all, he erected multi-floor apartment buildings at the beginning of his work there to lessen the need for apartments. In the following years, he produced plans for general building guidelines and land utilization, which went far beyond the existing city limits, and a plan for green space in 1926. Beblo was co-responsible for drawing up the Dante Stadium, for the popular family swimming pool Maria Einsiedel, and for the Technische Rathaus (Technical City Hall). In 1934, Munich got great importance as a center for transportation. The extension of the autobahn entrance at Ramersdorf and the Ludwigsbrücke (Ludwig's Bridge) are some of the last great tasks of Beblo before his retirement. After 1936, Beblo lived quite withdrawn in his house in Munich-Giesing. He died at the age of 74 and was buried in the Friedhof am Perlacher Forst (Cemetery at the Perlach Forest), which he himself had been involved in planning. For his special services to the city of Munich, a street in Munich-Bogenhausen was named after him in 1955.

== Family ==
In 1902 Beblo married Melanie Luise Knoch, whom he had met in Karlsruhe. He and his wife had three children. Beblo's daughter, Anne (who was an author of children's books) married Christian Kayssler, the son of his friend, Friedrich Kayssler. Both of his sons became architects, like their father. Fritz Beblo was an illustrator of several children's books by Morgenstern, as well as books by his daughter, Anne Kayssler-Beblo.

== Books ==
All books are in German.

- Alemannische und fränkische Elemente des Straßburger Bürgerhauses, in: Elsaß-Lothringen Yearbook 3, 1924, pp. 92–104
- Die Baukunst in Elsaß-Lothringen 1871–1918. In: Das Reichsland Elsaß-Lothringen 1871–1918, Vol. 3, Wissenschaft, Kunst und Literatur in Elsaß-Lothringen 1871–1918, Frankfurt am Main 1934, pp. 241–263.
- Works of Fritz Beblo in the catalog of the German National Library

== Literature ==
- Exhibition catalog Bauen auf Tradition, Fritz Beblo 1872–1947, in the city archive of Munich, 1991

== See also ==
- List of German painters
