= The Passion of Christ (Strasbourg) =

15th-century religious paintings

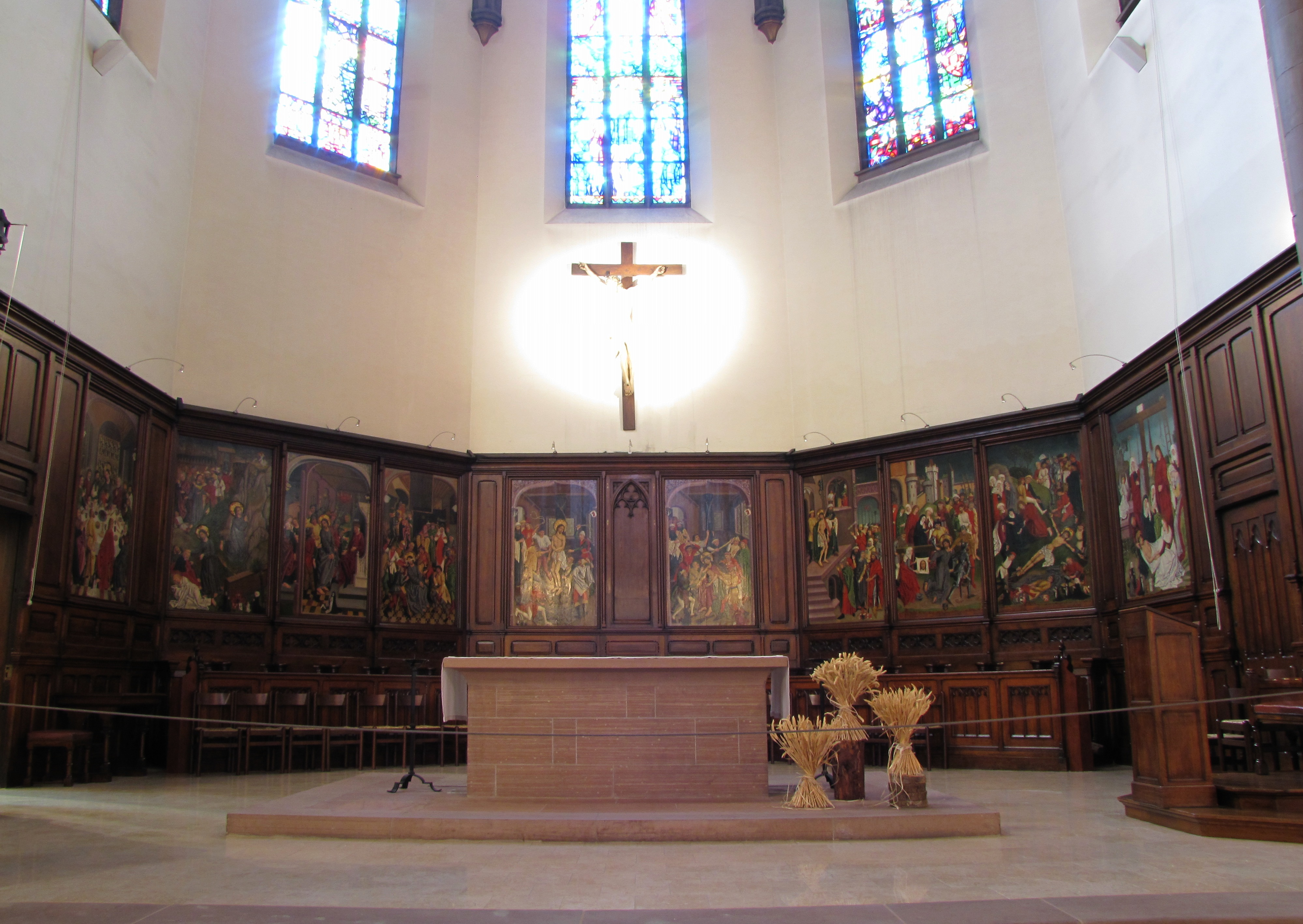
- Artist: Master of the Drapery Studies
- Year: 1485
- Medium: Oil painting
- Dimensions: 203 cm × 120 cm (80 in × 47 in)
- Location: Old Saint Peter's Church; Strasbourg

The Passion of Christ (French: La Passion du Christ) is a set of ten late 15th-century, Gothic religious paintings of the Passion of Jesus now displayed in the choir of the Catholic part of Old Saint Peter's Church in Strasbourg, France. The set is classified as a Monument historique by the French Ministry of Culture since 1978.

== History ==
The oil paintings, depicting selected scenes from the Passion of Jesus, are dated approximately from 1485 or 1488 or around 1490. The artist is generally thought to be one Heinrich Lützelmann (or Henri Lutzelmann in French), active in Strasbourg during these times. According to some scholars, he may be identical with the Anonymous master "Master of the Drapery Studies" (German: Meister der Gewandstudien), whose attributed work is recorded in the Alsatian capital during that period. The Musée de l’Œuvre Notre-Dame owns a few slightly earlier paintings by that artist, known in French as Maître des études de draperies.

The Strasbourg Passion of Christ was originally painted for the new Magdalene Church, which was completed in 1478. That church was almost entirely destroyed by a fire in 1904. The Passion paintings, however, had been sold by the Magdalene parish to the Saint Peter's parish at some point in the 19th century after the opening of the Neo-Gothic extension and were thus preserved. Most of the ten paintings feature donor portraits complete with coats of arms, on a much smaller scale than the main depicted event.

The paintings depict the episodes immediately preceding and following the Crucifixion of Jesus but not actually Jesus hanging from the Cross. In the church, this is represented by an 18th-century crucifix hung above the centre of the set.

The dimensions of the nine first paintings of the set are 203 centimetres (80 inches) high and 120 centimetres (47 inches) wide. The tenth painting, the Descent from the Cross (or Lamentation of Christ) is approximately 155 centimetres (61 inches) wide and may not originally have belonged to the same set.

== Gallery ==
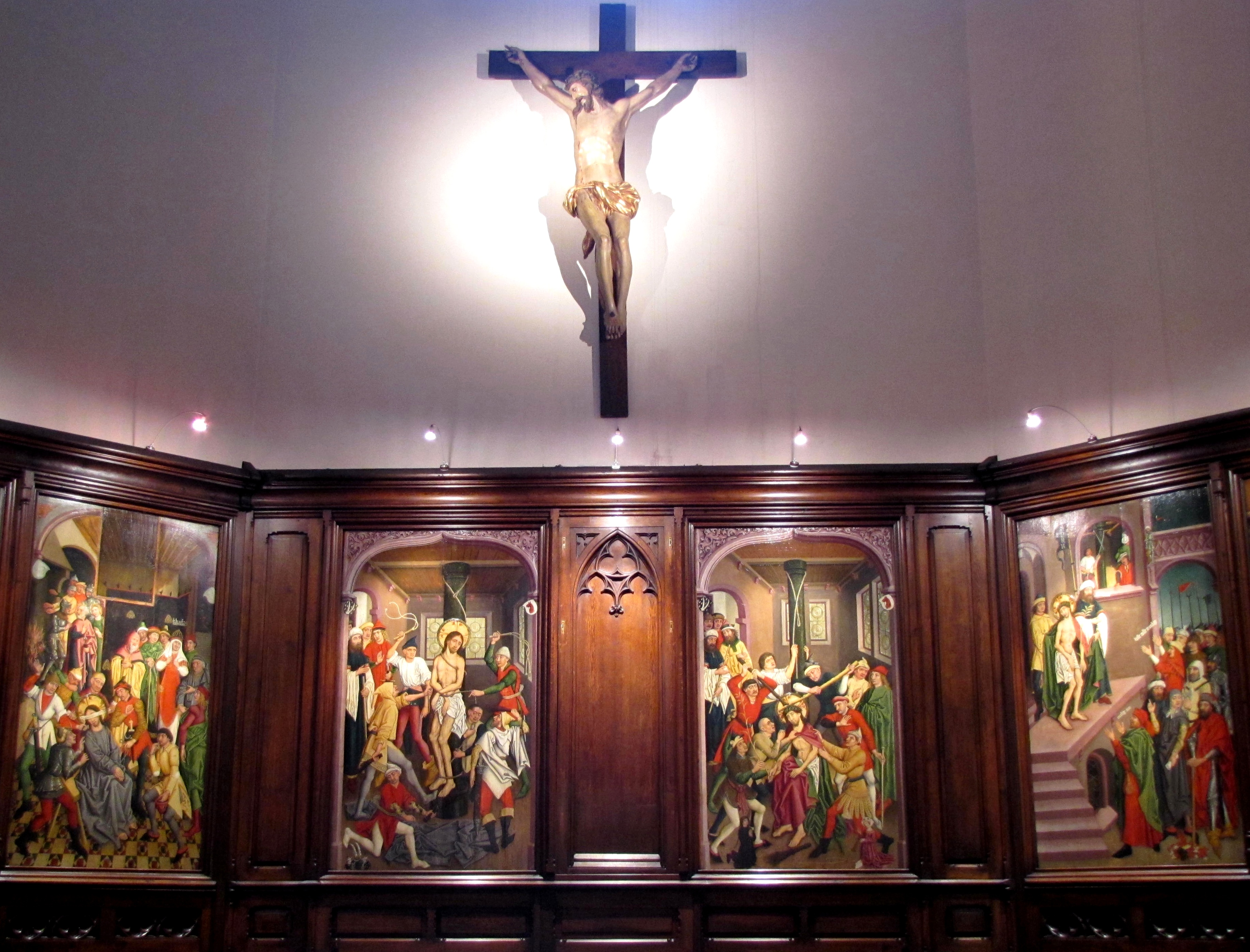
The central panels and the 18th-century crucifix

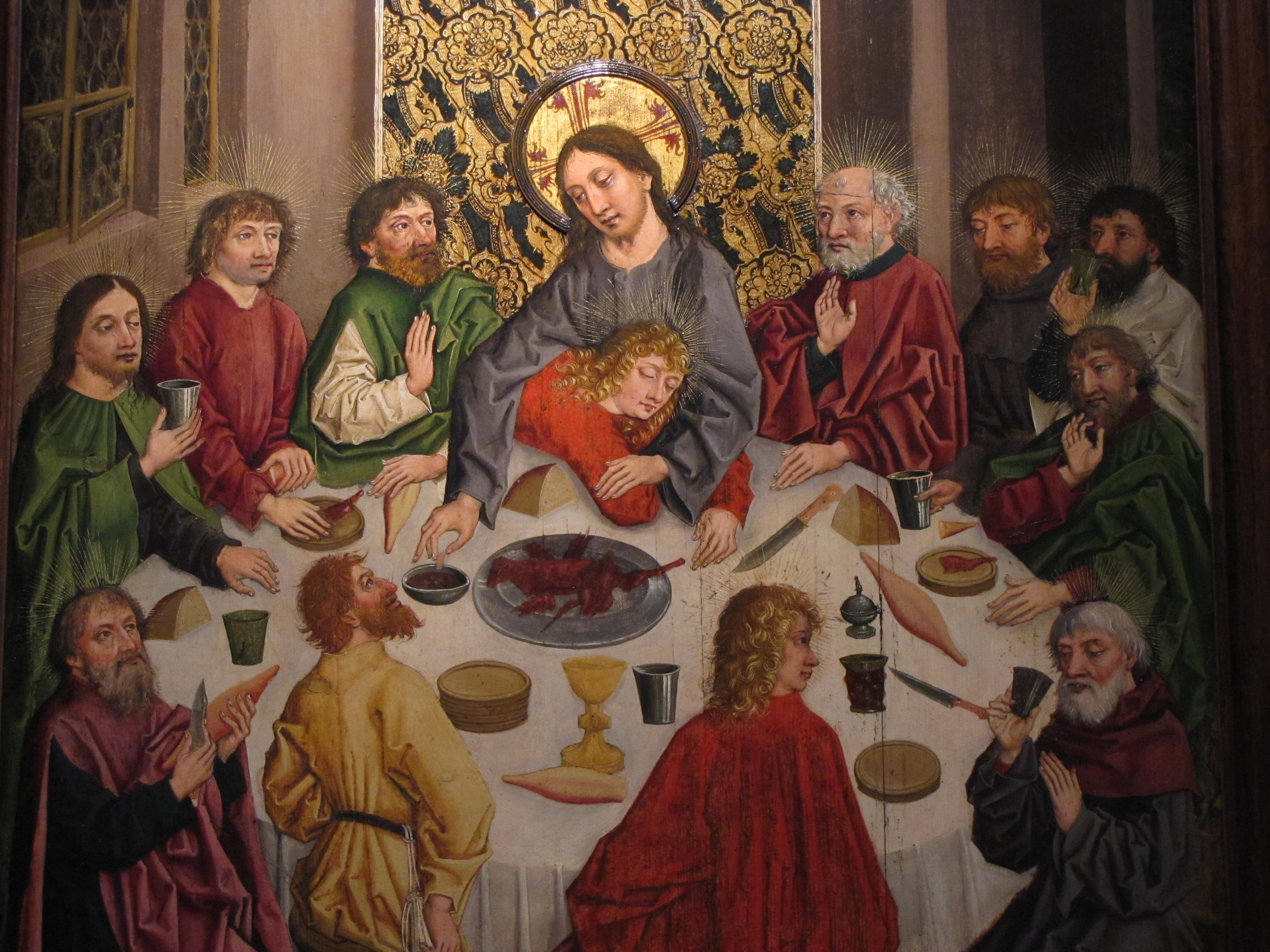
Last Supper (detail)

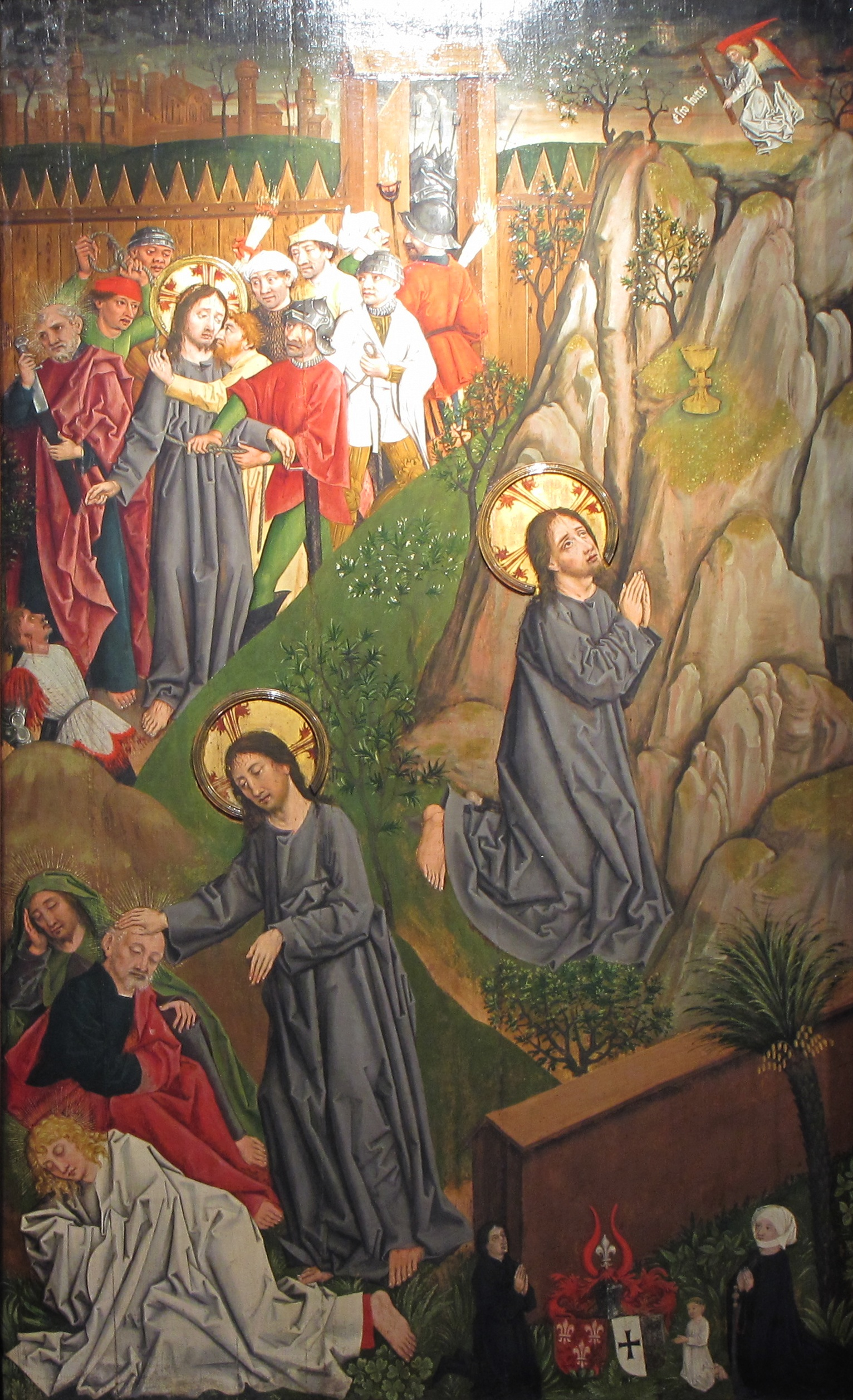
Agony in the Garden, Arrest of Jesus

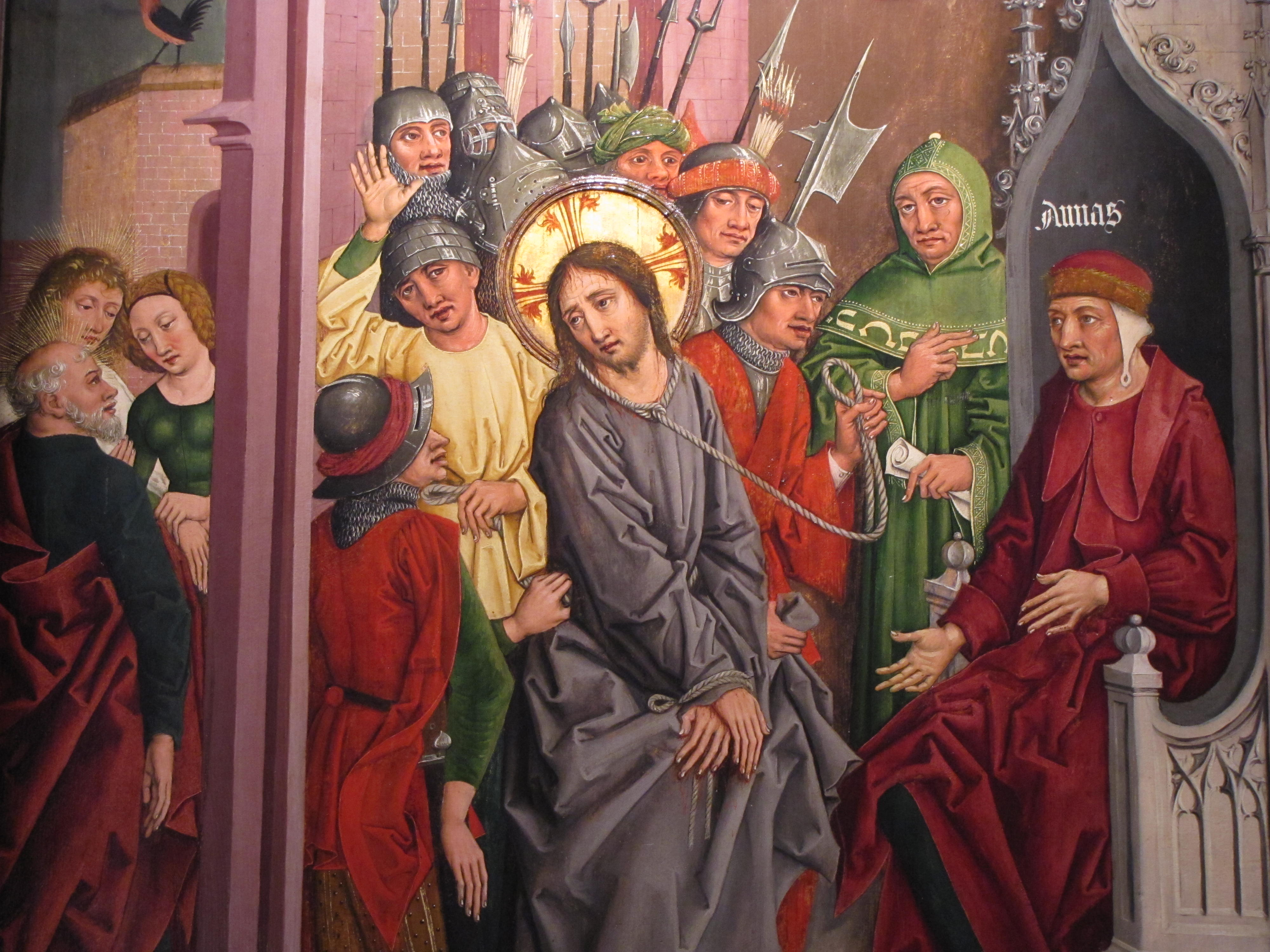
Christ before Annas (detail)

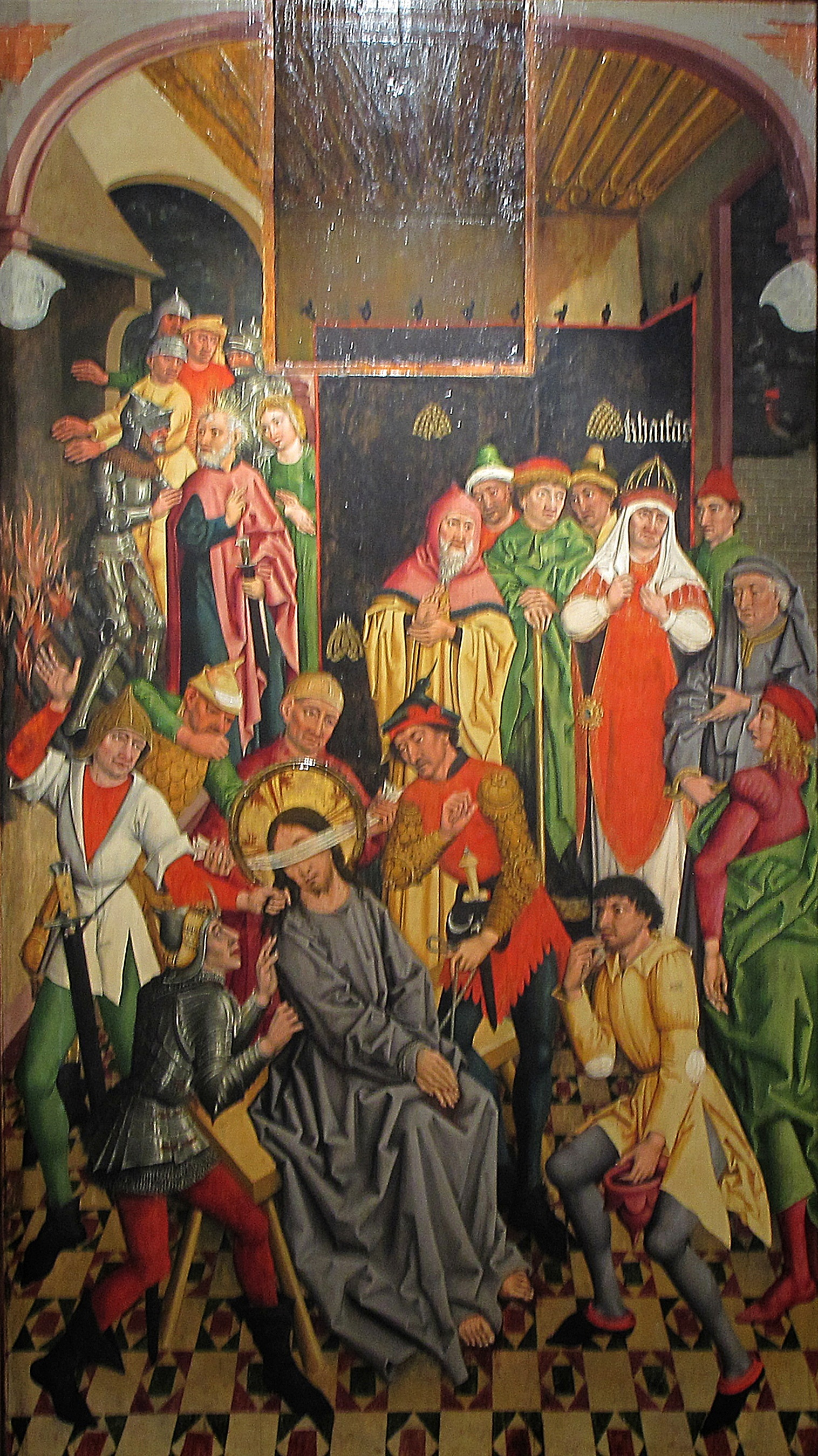
Derision of Christ

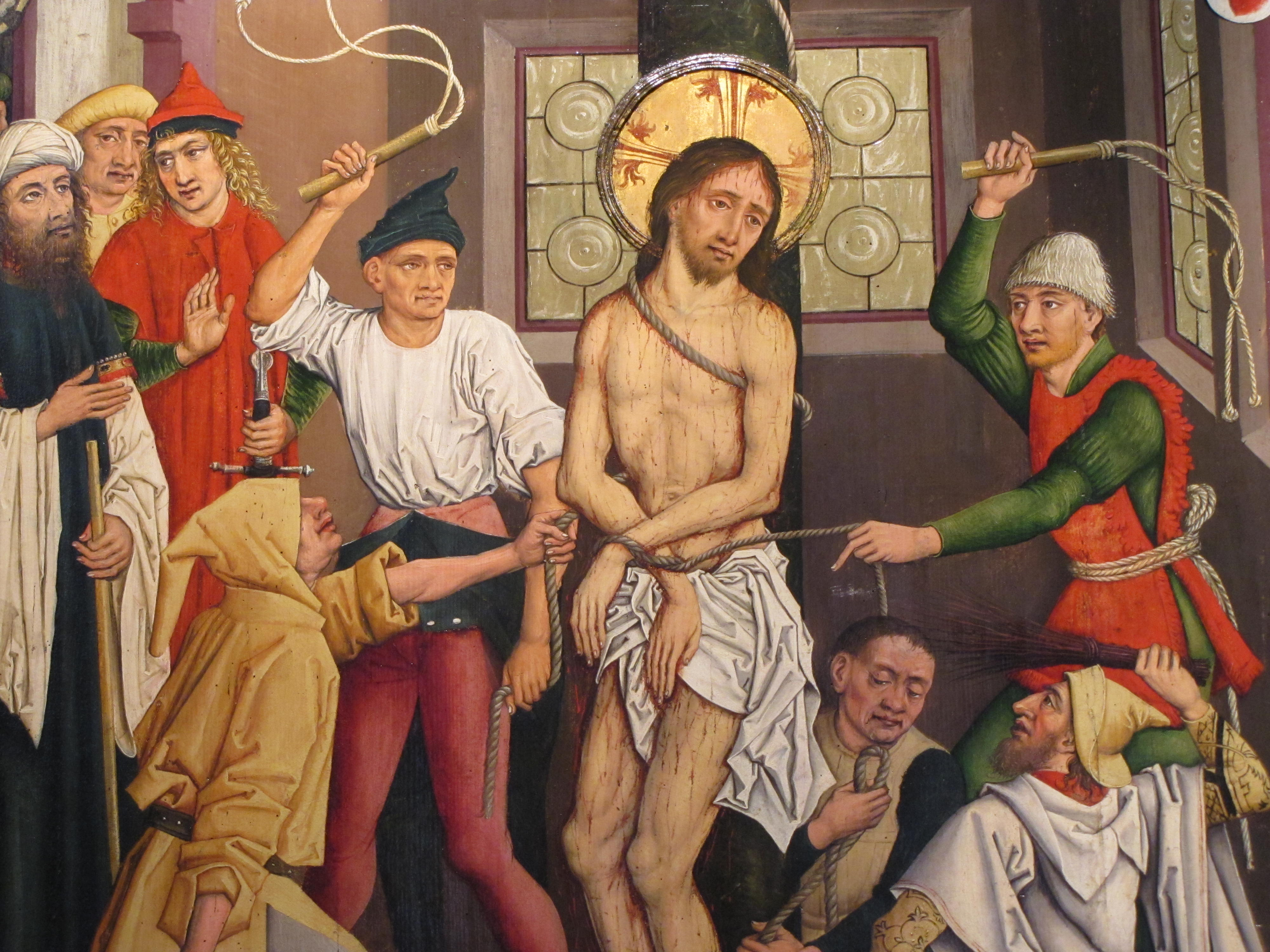
Flagellation of Christ (detail)

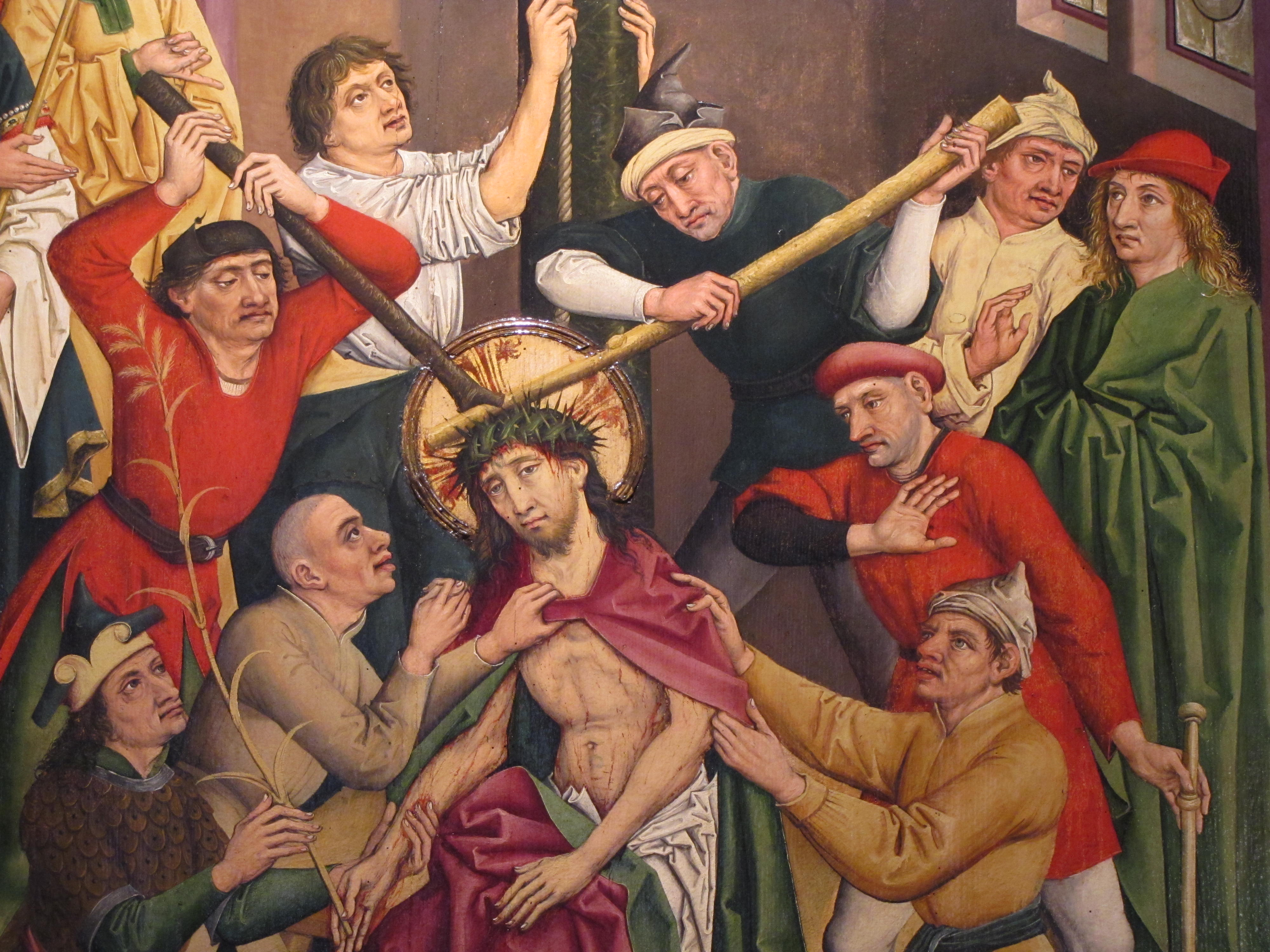
The Crown of Thorns (detail)

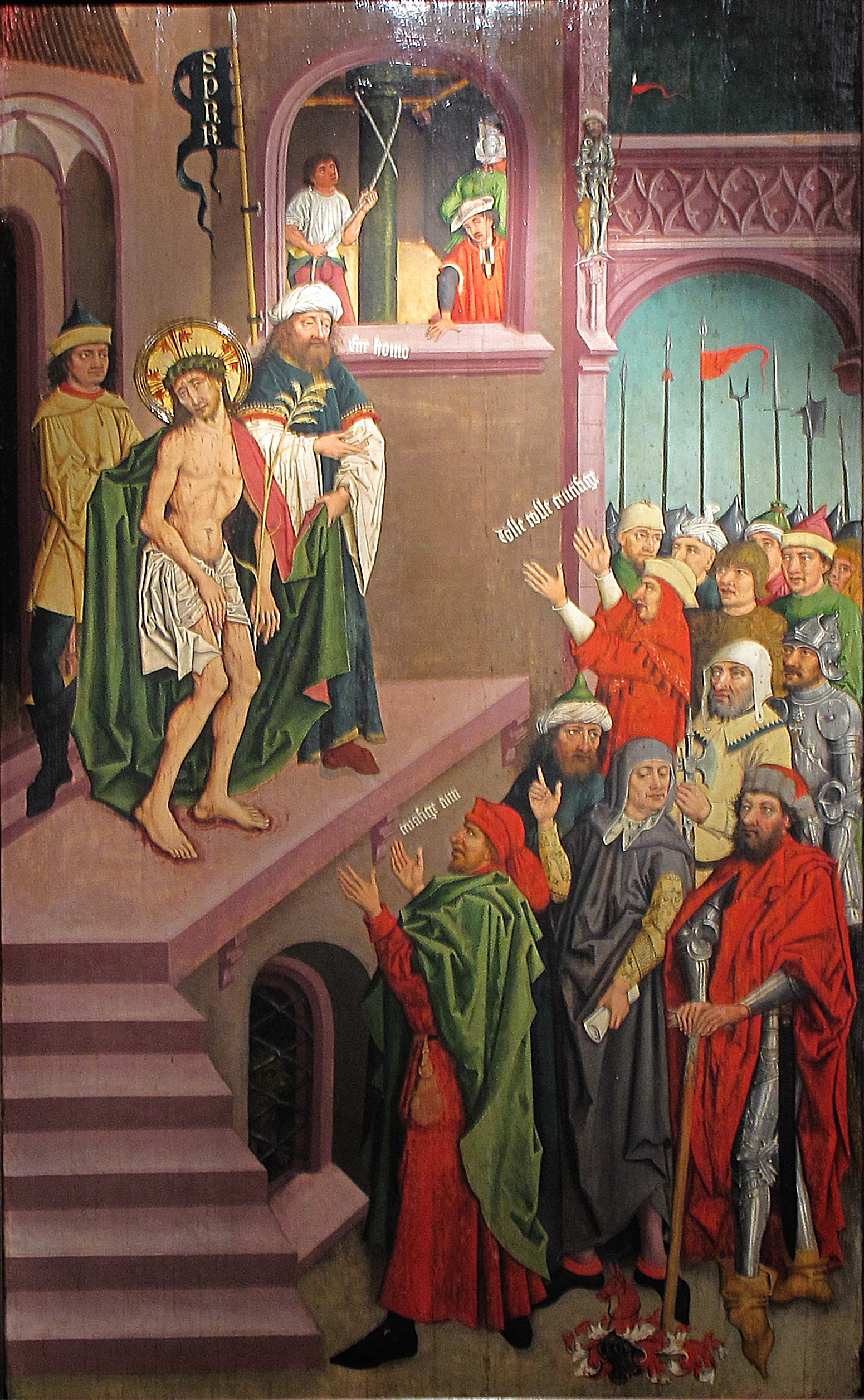
Ecce homo

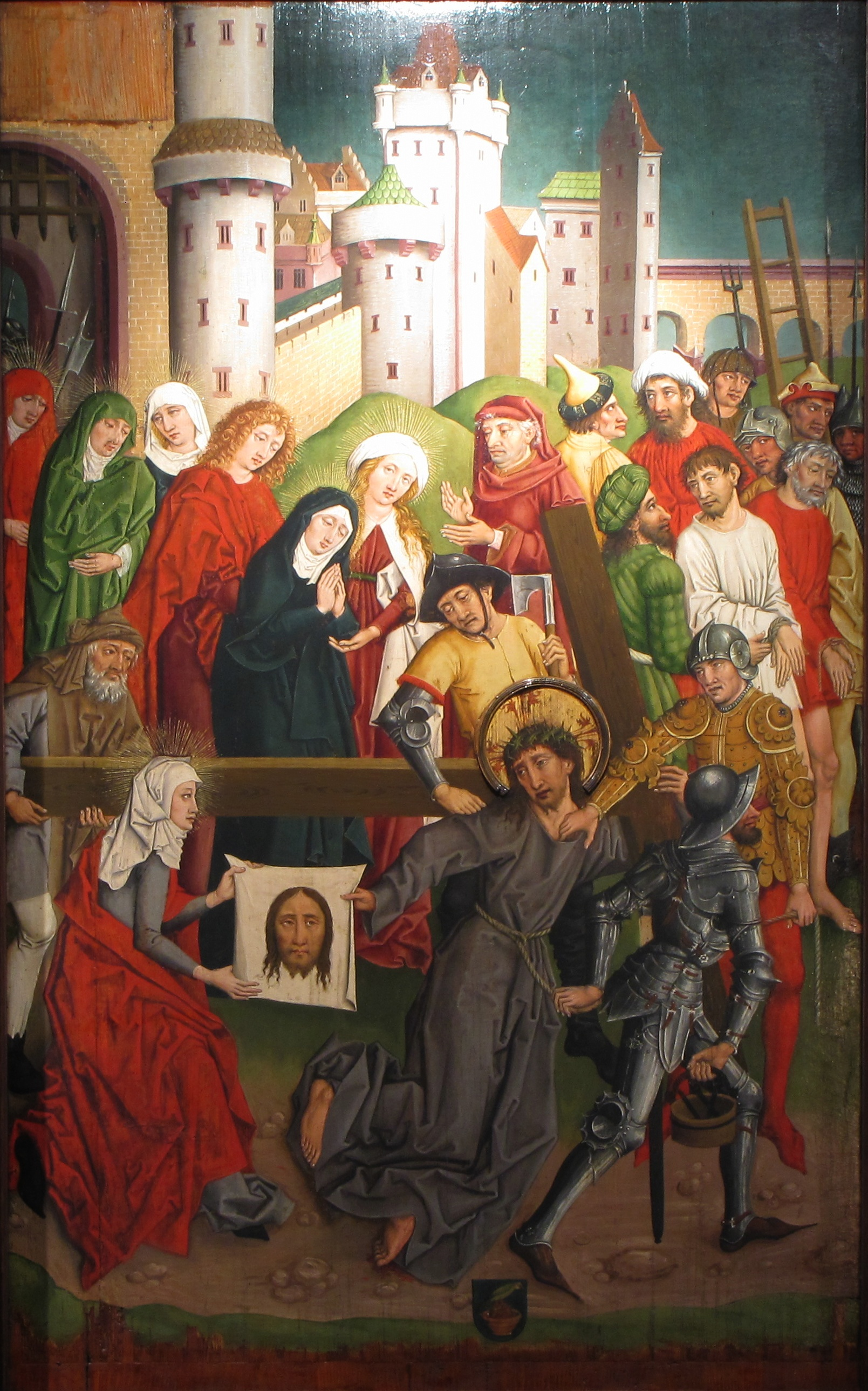
Bearing of the Cross, Veil of Veronica

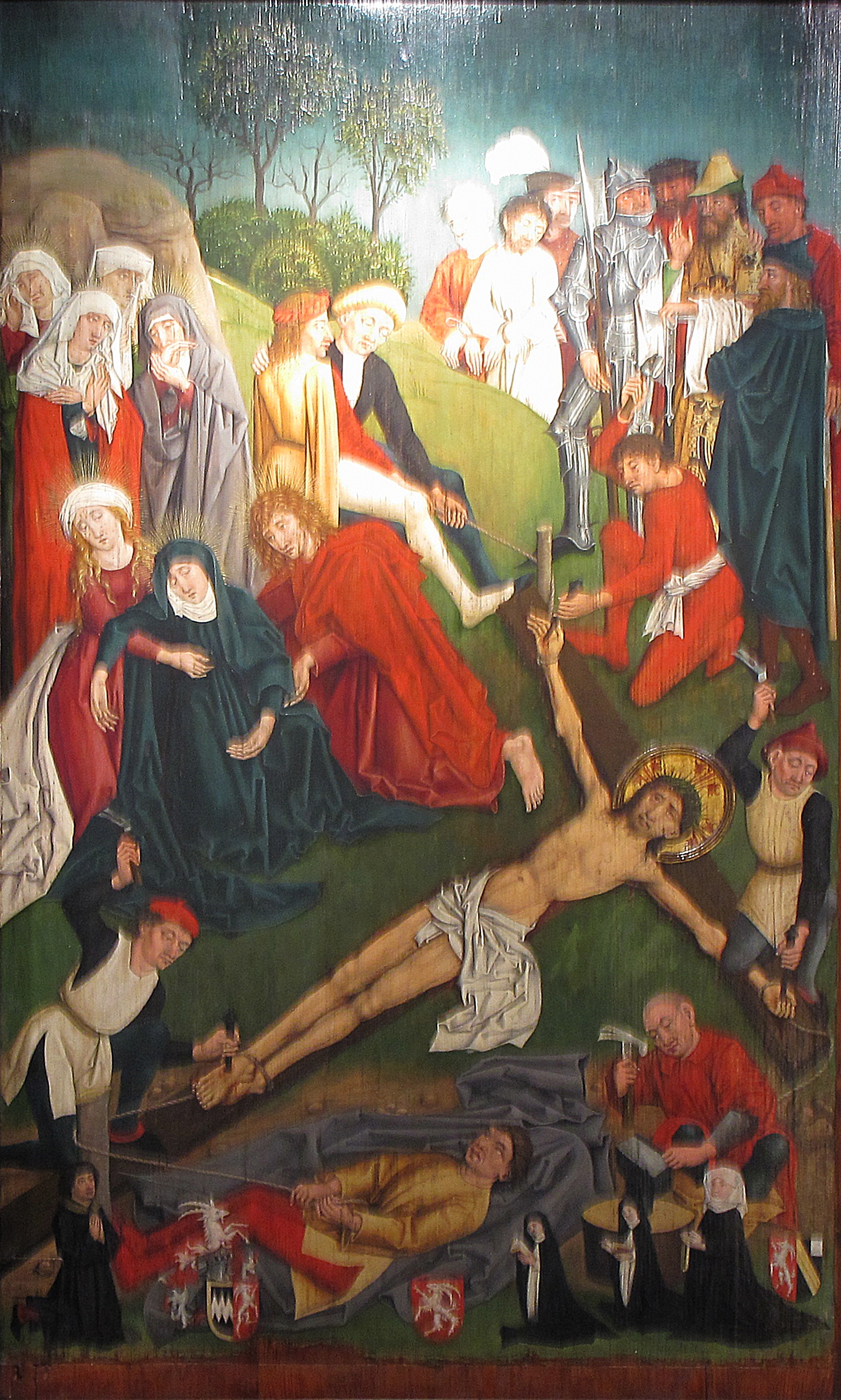
Nailing on the Cross

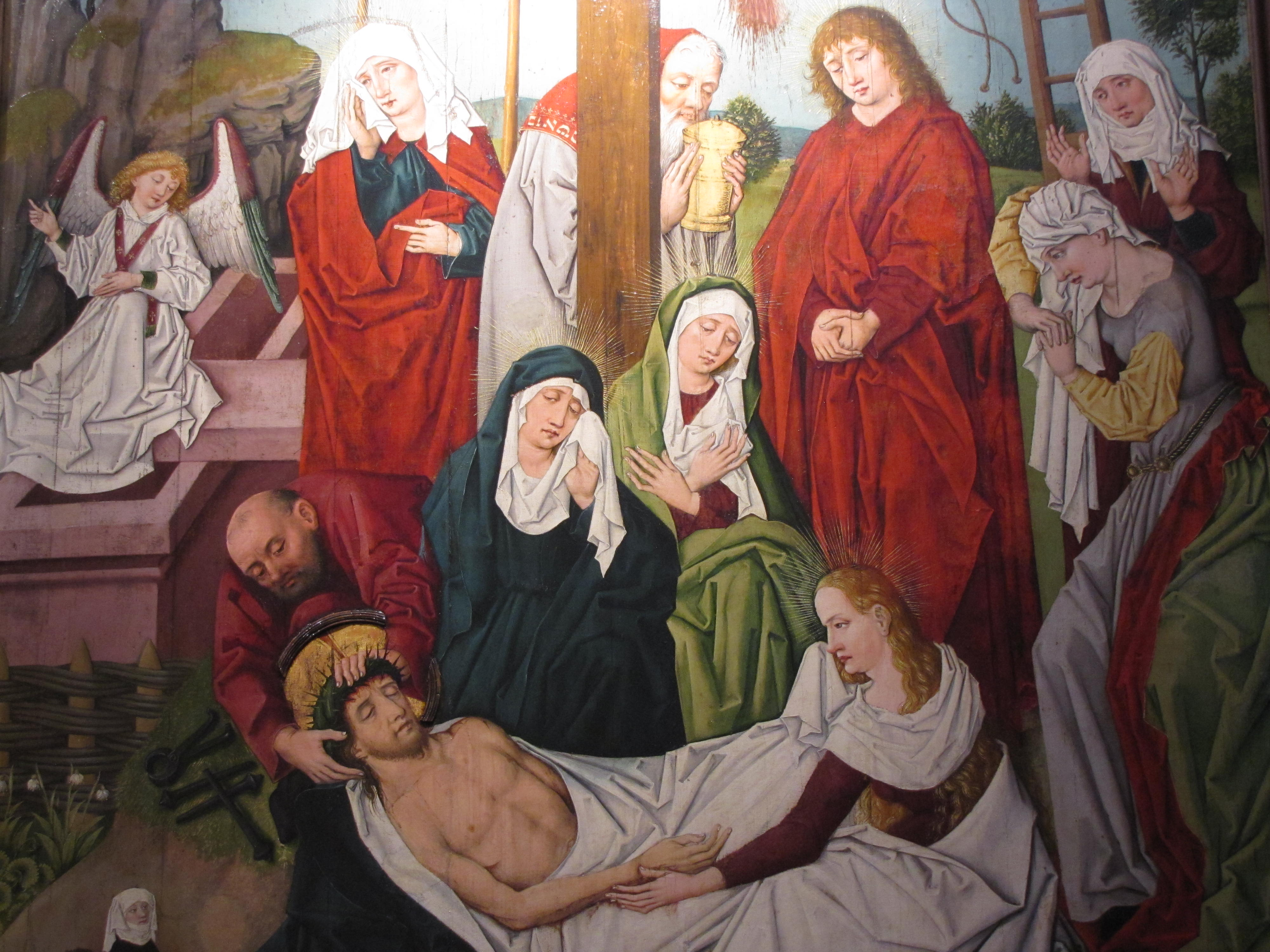
Descent from the Cross (detail)

== See also ==
- Category:Paintings of the Passion of Jesus
