= Margot =

Margot (/ˈmɑːrɡoʊ, ˈmɑːrɡət/ MAR-goh, MAR-gət, French: [maʁɡo]) is a feminine given name, a French diminutive of Marguerite that has long been used as an independent name. Variant spellings in use include Margo and Margaux. It is also occasionally a surname.

== Usage ==
An increase in usage of the name in England and Wales was attributed to the popularity of the Australian actress Margot Robbie and the 2023 American film Barbie. The name was among the top 50 names given to British girls born in 2023. It has also increased in use elsewhere in the Anglosphere, including New Zealand and the United States. It has been in regular use in French-speaking countries including Belgium, France, and in Quebec, Canada. Persons named Margot include the following:

== People with the given name ==
- Marguerite de Valois (1553–1615), known as La Reine Margot, queen of France and of Navarre
- Margot Abad, Argentine film actress
- Margot Adler (1946–2014), American journalist
- Margot Anand (born 1944) , French author, teacher, seminar leader and public speaker
- Margot Arce de Vázquez (1904–1990), Puerto Rican essayist and educator
- Margot Arnold (1925–2016), British-born American novelist
- Margot Asquith (1864–1945), countess of Oxford and Asquith
- Margot Austin (1907–1990), American children’s book illustrator
- Margot Badran (born 1936), scholar of Middle Eastern history and women's studies
- Margot Bailet (born 1990), French alpine skier
- Margot Bærentzen (1907–1983), Danish fencer
- Margot Becke-Goehring (1914–2009), German chemist
- Margot Benacerraf (1926–2024), Venezuelan film director
- Margot Bengtsson (born 1943), Swedish psychologist
- Margot Bennett, several people
- Margot von Beroldingen (1878–1968), American heiress
- Margot Bettauer Dembo (1928–2019), German-born American translator
- Margot Béziat (born 2001), French canoeist
- Margot Bingham (born 1987), American actress and singer-songwriter
- Margot Blakely (born 1950), New Zealand alpine skier
- Margot Blanche (born 1983), French/Filipino singer and songwriter
- Margot Boch (born 1999), French bobsledder
- Margot Boer (born 1985), Dutch speed skater
- Margot Bogert, American Scouting leader
- Margot Botsford (born 1947), American judge
- Margot Boulet (born 1990), French rower
- Margot Boyd (1913–2008), English actress
- Margot Bryant (1897–1988), British actress
- Margot Canaday, American historian
- Margot Chevrier (born 1999), French pole vaulter
- Margot Ciccarelli, Brazilian jiu jitsu practitioner from Italy
- Margot Clyne (born 1995), American cyclist
- Margot Comstock (1940–2022), American computer magazine editor
- Margot Cottens (1922–1999), Uruguayan actress
- Margot Dalton, American novelist
- Margot Day, American singer-songwriter
- Margot Debén (1922–2010), Nicaraguan-Puerto Rican actress, singer, musician, show host and magician
- Margot Desvignes (born 2000), French ice hockey player
- Margot Dittmeyer (born 1935), German tennis player
- Margot Donald (1923–2005), Australian photographer
- Margot Dorenfeldt (1895–1986), Norwegian chemist
- Margot Douaihy, American writer
- Margot Drake (1899–1948), English actress
- Margot Dreschel (1908–1945), nazi concentration camp guard
- Margot Duhalde (1920–2018), Chilean aviator
- Margot Eates (1913–1994), British art historian and curator
- Margot Eskens (1936–2022), German singer
- Margot Fassler, American historian
- Margot Finn, British historian and academic
- Margot Flemming (born 1993), Canadian curler
- Margot Fonteyn (1919–1991), British ballerina
- Margot Forde (1935–1992), New Zealand botanist
- Margot Foster (born 1958), Australian rower
- Margot Frank (1926–1945), sister of German World War II diarist Anne Frank
- Margot Franssen (born 1952), Dutch-born Canadian entrepreneur and activist
- Margot Friedländer (1921–2025), German survivor of the Holocaust and public speaker
- Margot Garabedian (born 1996), Cambodian triathlete
- Margot Gayle (1908–2008), American historian preservationist
- Margot van Geffen (born 1989), Dutch field hockey player
- Margot Glockshuber (born 1949), German pair skater
- Margot Gore (1913–1993), British aviator and osteopath
- Margot Grahame (1911–1982), British actress
- Margot Guilleaume (1910–2004), German operatic soprano
- Margot Hartman (1933–2020), American actress
- Margot Hellwig (born 1941), German volksmusik singer
- Margot Heuman (1928–2022), German-born American Holocaust survivor
- Margot Hielscher (1919–2017), German singer and actress
- Margot Hilton (born 1947), British-born Australian author
- Margot Honecker (1927–2016), German politician, wife of Erich Honecker
- Margot Horspool, British jurist
- Margot Hutcheson (born 1952), Australian artist
- Margot Isaacs, Marchioness of Reading (1919–2015), British aristocrat and campaigner
- Margot James (born 1957), British Conservative politician
- Margot Janse (born 1969), Dutch chef
- Margot Jefferys (1916–1999), British sociologist and professor
- Margot Kalinke (1909–1981), German politician
- Margot Kaminski, American AI and privacy professor
- Margot Käßmann (born 1958), German theologist and writer
- Margot Kelly (1894–1983), Australian hotel manager and restaurateur
- Margot Kidder (1948–2018), Canadian-American actress known for playing Lois Lane in Superman
- Margot Klestil-Löffler (born 1954), Austrian diplomat
- Margot Knight, Australian actress
- Margot Kober (born 1965), Austrian cross-country skier
- Margot Kraneveldt (born 1967), Dutch politician
- Margot Lambert (born 1999), French badminton player
- Margot Lander (1910–1961), Danish ballerina
- Margot Leeuwenburgh (born 1995), Dutch rower
- Margot Leicester (born 1949), British actress
- Margot Lemire (1946–2024), Canadian poet and playwright
- Margot Leverett, American clarinet player
- Margot Livesey (born 1953), Scottish-born writer
- Margot Llobera (born 1996), Andorran footballer
- Margot Lovejoy (1930–2019), American artist and art historian
- Margot Lumb (1912–1998), British squash player
- Margot MacGibbon (1906–1998), Australian violinist and teacher
- Margot Machol, American writer and government official
- Margot Mahler (1948–1997), German actress
- Margot Marshall (1918–2010), British soldier
- Margot Marsman (1932–2018), Dutch swimmer
- Margot Mayo (1910–1974), American dance instructor
- Margot Moe (1899–1988), Norwegian figure skater
- Margot Moles (1913–1987), Spanish alpine skier
- Margot Neville, pseudonym of Margot Goyder and Ann Goyder
- Margot O'Neill (born 1958), Australian journalist, writer and producer
- Margot Osmeña (born 1949), Filipino politician
- Margot Pardoe (1902–1996), British children's writer
- Margot Parker (born 1943), British politician
- Margot Peet (1903–1995), American painter
- Margot Perryman (born 1938), British artist
- Margot Peters (1933–2022), American novelist and biographer
- Margot Pfannstiel (1926–1993), German journalist
- Margot Philips (1902–1988), New Zealand painter
- Margot Pilz (born 1936), Austrian visual artist
- Margot Prior (1937–2020), Australian psychologist and autism researcher
- Margot von Renesse (1940–2022), German politician
- Margot Ravinel (born 2002), French ski mountaineer
- Margot Rhys (1914–1996), Australian actress
- Margot Rojas Mendoza (1903–1996), Cuban pianist and teacher
- Margot Robbie (born 1990), Australian actress and producer
- Margot Robinne (born 1991), French footballer
- Margot Römer (1938–2005), Venezuelan artist
- Margot Roosevelt (born 1950), American journalist
- Margot Rose (born 1956), American actress
- Margot Ruddock (1907–1951), English actress, poet and singer
- Margot Sanger-Katz, American journalist
- Margot von Schlieffen (1921–2014), German film editor
- Margot Lee Shetterly (born 1969), American nonfiction writer
- Margot Shiner (1923–1998), German-British gastroenterologist
- Margot Shumway (born 1979), American rower
- Margot Siegel (1923–2015), American journalist
- Margot Sikabonyi (born 1982), Italian actress
- Margot Singer, American short story writer and novelist
- Margot Smith (1966–2011), Australian musical artist
- Margot Sponer (1898–1945), German philologist and resistant fighter
- Margot Stern Strom (1941–2023), American educator
- Margot Stevenson (1912–2011), American actress
- Margot Sunderland, British psychologist
- Małgorzata Szutowicz (born 1995), widely known as Margot, Polish non-binary LGBTQIA activist and co-founder of the Stop Bzdurom collective
- Margot Taulé (1920–2008), Dominican engineer and architect
- Margot Thien (born 1971), American synchronized swimmer
- Margot Tomes (1917–1991), American artist and illustrator
- Margot Trooger (1923–1994), German actress
- Margot Turner (1910–1993), British nurse
- Margot Vanpachtenbeke (born 1999), Belgian cyclist
- Margot Vella, Australian dual-code rugby player
- Margot Walle (1921–1990), Norwegian figure skater
- Margot Wallström (born 1954), Swedish politician
- Margot Walter (1903–1994), German actress
- Margot Wells (born 1952), British athlete
- Margot Werner (1937–2012), Austrian ballet dancer, singer and actress
- Margot Wicki-Schwarzschild (1931–2020), German Holocaust witness
- Margot Wikström (1936–2010) Swedish politician of the Social Democratic Party
- Margot Williams, American botanist
- Margot Yerolymos (born 1997), French tennis player
- Margot Zemach (1931–1989), American illustrator
- Margot Zuidhof (born 1992), Dutch field hockey player

== People with the surname ==
- Georges Margot (1902–1998), French equestrian
- Jean-Luc Margot (born 1969), Belgian astronomer
- Manuel Margot (born 1994), Dominican baseball player

== Fictional characters ==
- Margot, 2009 film starring Anne-Marie Duff as ballerina Margot Fonteyn
- Margot at the Wedding, 2007 American film by Noah Baumbach
- La Reine Margot, 1845 novel by Alexandre Dumas
- La Reine Margot (1994 film), 1994 film based on the Dumas novel starring Isabelle Adjani
- Margot, a character in the film Legally Blonde
- Margot, a character in the comic book Nemesis: Reloaded, Nemesis: Rogues' Gallery, and Nemesis: Forever
- Margot Tenenbaum, a character in the film The Royal Tenenbaums
- Margot, the protagonist of Ray Bradbury's All Summer in a Day
- Margot Mary Wendice, a character in the 1954 Alfred Hitchcock film Dial M For Murder
- Margot Beste-Chetwynde, a character in Evelyn Waugh's novel Decline and Fall
- Margot Lane, assistant to Lamont Cranston, a character in the 1940 American film serial The Shadow
- Margot Leadbetter, the Goods' neighbour, a character in the 1970s British sitcom The Good Life (1975 TV series)

== See also ==
- Princess Margaret, Countess of Snowdon (1930–2002), youngest child of George VI and sister of Elizabeth II; affectionately known as Margot in the British royal family
