= Place de la République, Strasbourg =

One of the main squares of the city of Strasbourg, France

Place de la République
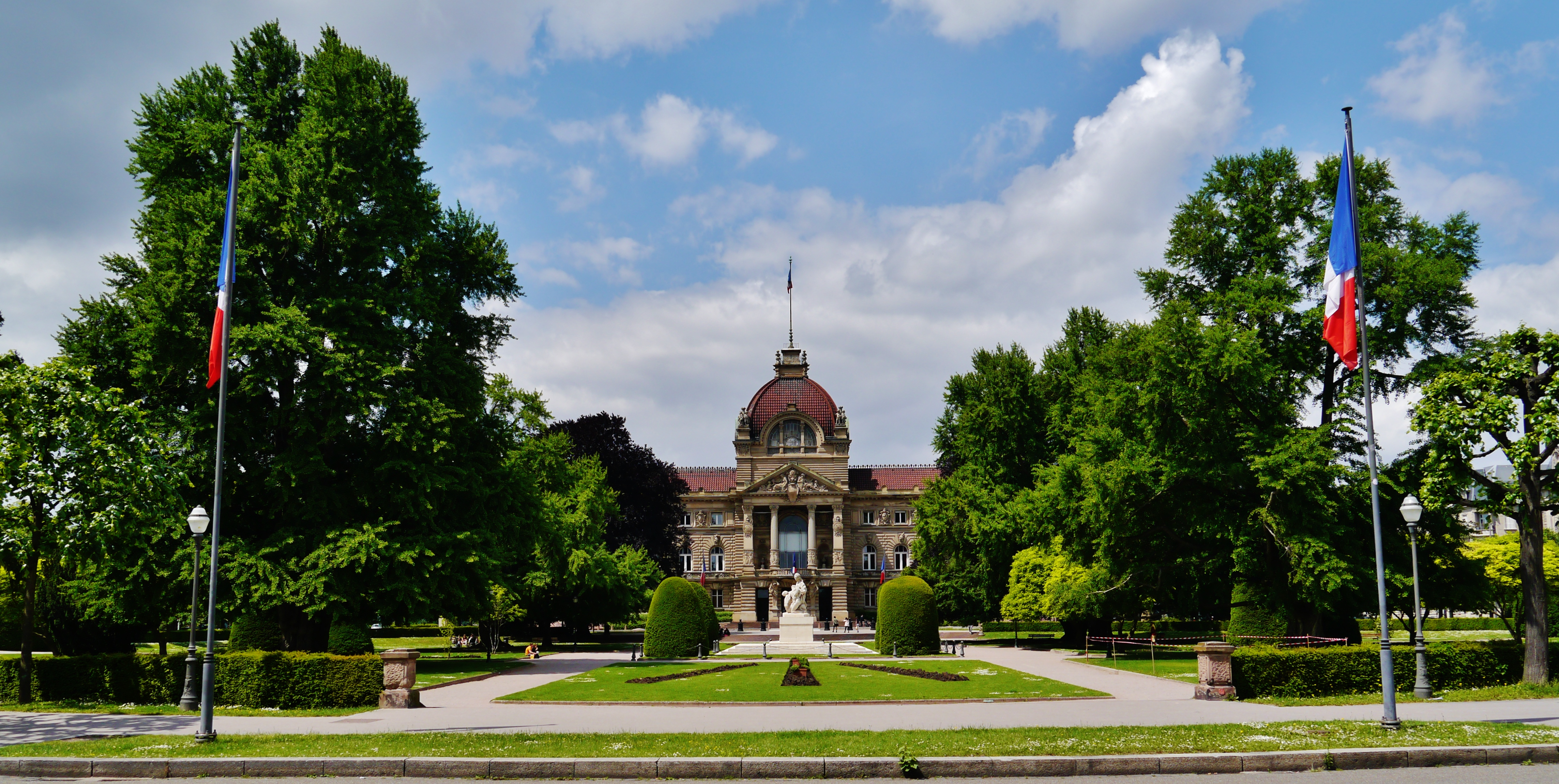
- Trees on the Place de la République
- Interactive map of Place de la République
- Type: Public square
- Location: Strasbourg, Alsace, France
- Coordinates: 48.58721°N 7.75397°E

The Place de la République (French pronunciation: [plas də la ʁepyblik], "Republic Square"; former German: Kaiserplatz, "Imperial Square") is one of the main squares of Strasbourg, France. It is surrounded on three sides by five buildings, none of which are residential: the Palais du Rhin, the National and University Library, the Théâtre national de Strasbourg, the Préfecture of Grand Est and Bas-Rhin, and the tax center Hôtel des impôts. All of these buildings are classified as monuments historiques. The fourth side of the square is devoid of buildings; it faces the Faux-Rempart Canal.

== Description and history ==
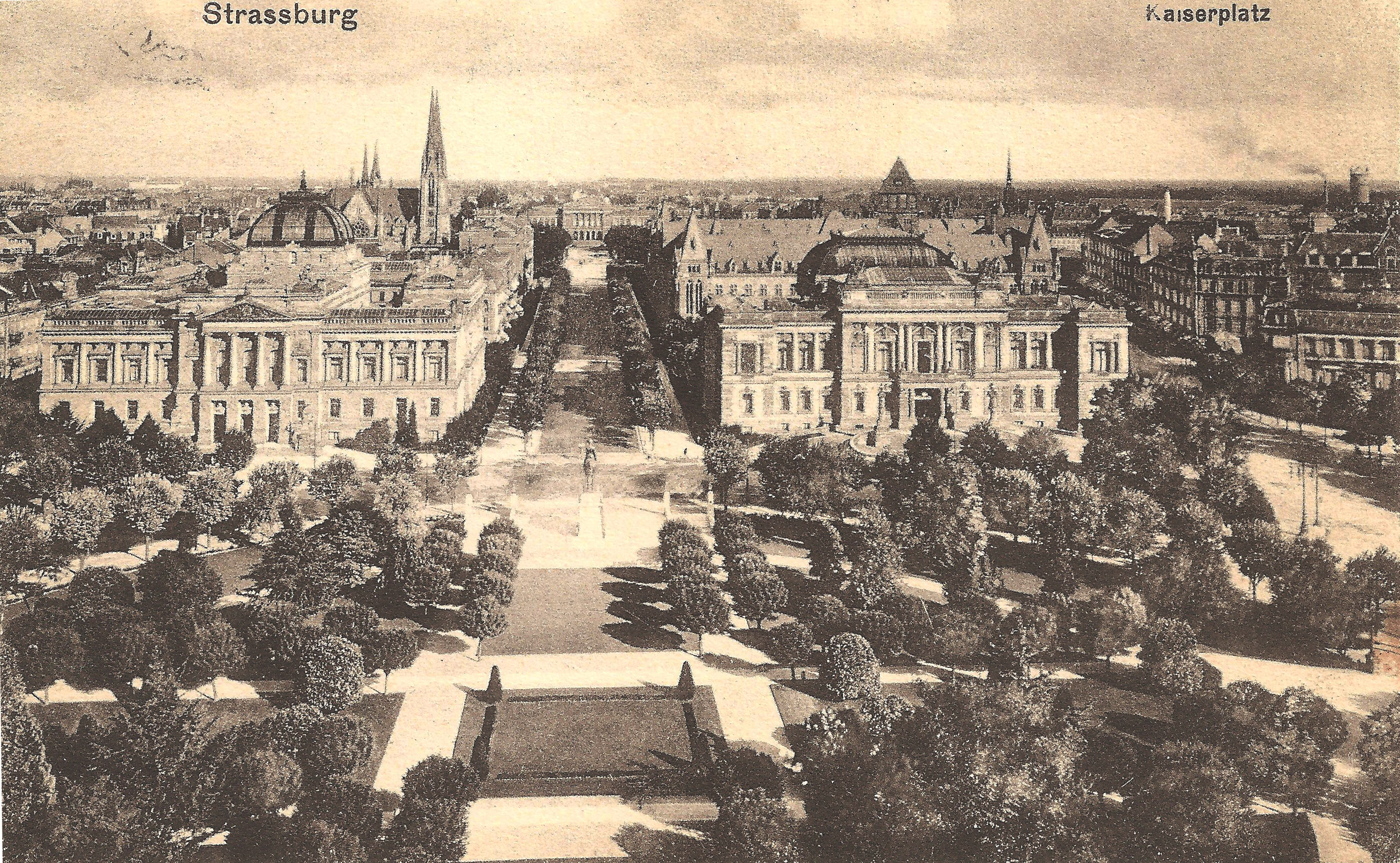
Center and east side of the square (then still called Kaiserplatz) around 1915, looking to St. Paul's Church and the University Palace

The Place de la République is a square (four sides of identical lengths) surrounding a circular public garden crossed by a north-west and a south-east axis. The area was originally occupied by a section of the city walls, which were demolished after the Franco-Prussian War. An ancient Jewish cemetery was located on grounds near to the river; it is assumed to be the place where the Jews of Strasbourg were burned at the stake in 1349.

The Place de la République was designed by architect Jean-Geoffroy Conrath (1824–1892) during the Reichsland period as the conspicuous and grandiose entrance of the Neustadt opposite the ancient Grande Île city center on the other side of the Ill. The layout and construction of the square began in 1880. It was then called Kaiserplatz ("Imperial Square" or "Emperor Square"). Ginkgo biloba trees, which were presented by Emperor Meiji of Japan to his German counterpart (either Wilhelm I or Wilhelm II, depending on the source), were planted in the central garden in the 1880s; those trees still stand today. Conversely, a purple beech and a fern-leaf beech, planted between 1883 and 1887, were felled by a storm in the night of the 19–20 June 2019.

In the very centre of the square stands a war memorial statue by Léon-Ernest Drivier, inaugurated in 1936. It represents a mother holding two dead sons, alluding to the dual nature of Strasbourg's history between Germany and France. The memorial replaces an equestrian statue of Emperor Wilhelm I, commissioned in 1897, that stood on the square from 1911 until 1918.

=== Palais du Rhin ===
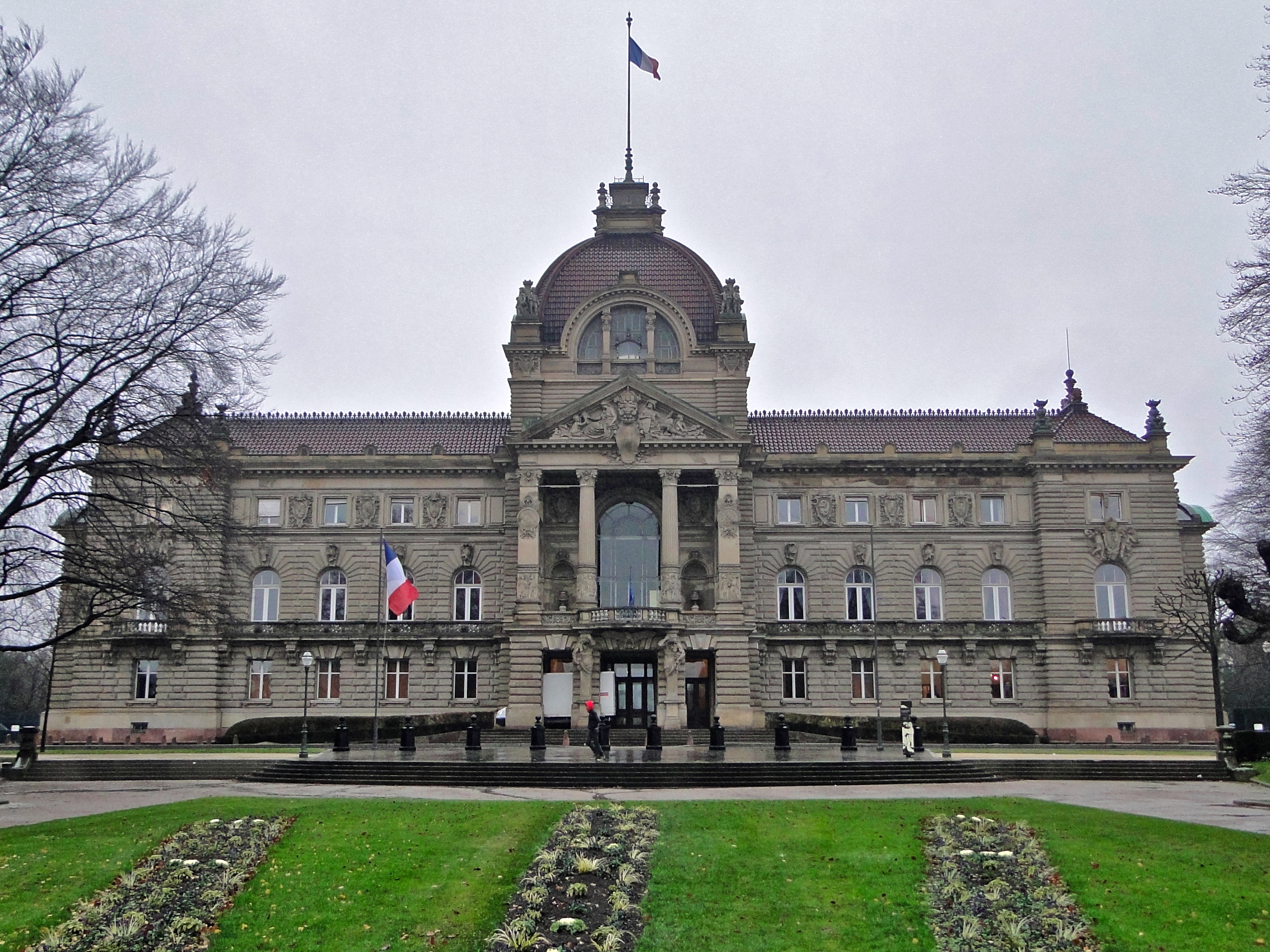
Palais du Rhin

The former Imperial Palace is surrounded by its own garden, which is separated from the square by a monumental wrought iron fence. The Palace, a solemn neo-Renaissance building crowned with a heavy dome, was built from 1884 until 1887 by Hermann Eggert. It is used as the seat of the Central Commission for Navigation on the Rhine since 1920 and also houses the Direction régionale des affaires culturelles (DRAC) of Grand Est. It is classified as a monument historique since 1993.

=== Théâtre national de Strasbourg ===
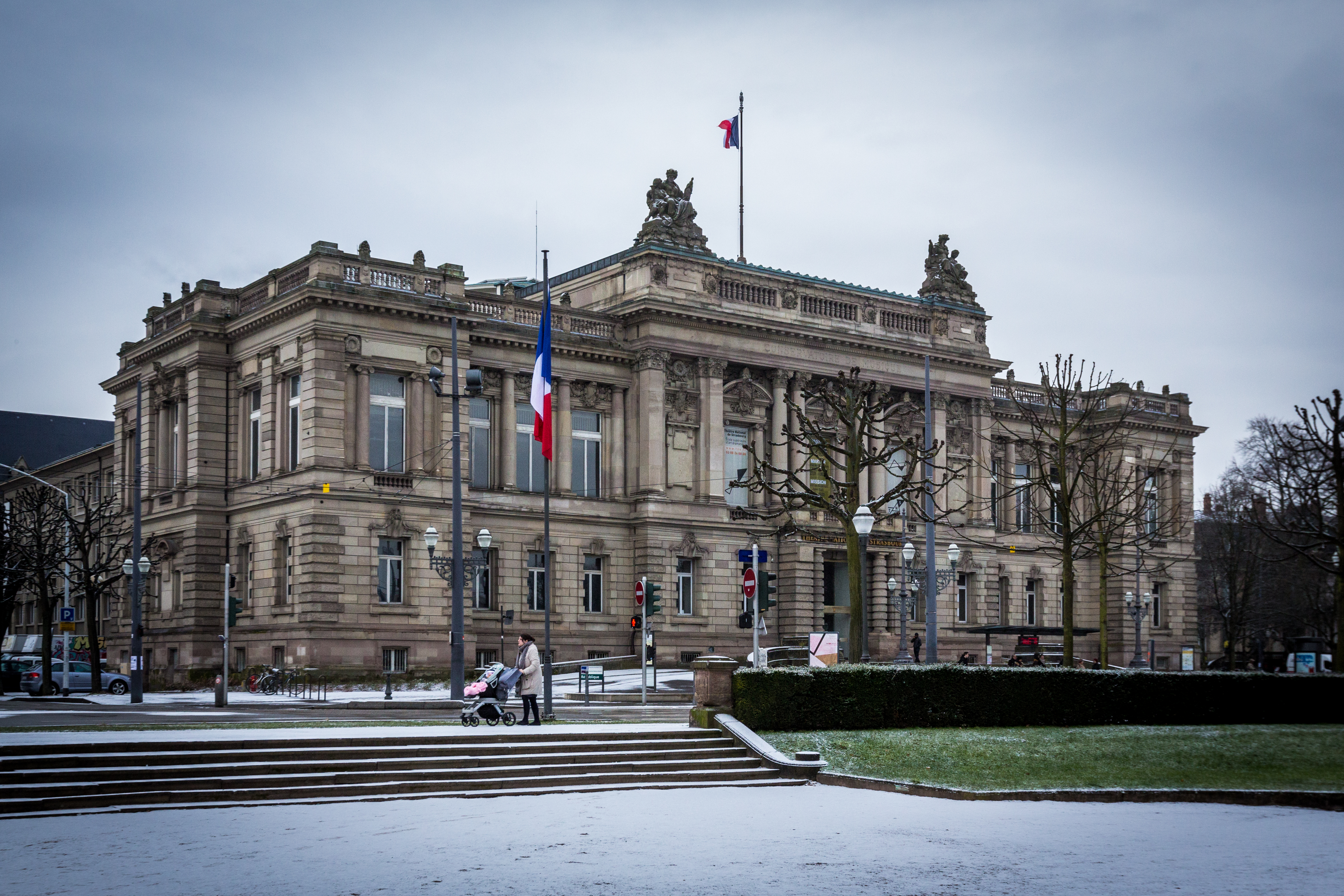
Théâtre national de Strasbourg

The building now housing the Théâtre national de Strasbourg (TNS) was originally built as the seat of the Parliament (German: Landtag) of Alsace-Lorraine. It was designed by August Hartel and Skjold Neckelmann in a radically different neo-Renaissance style than Hermann Eggert's, and built in 1888–89. It is classified as a monument historique since 1992.

=== National and University Library ===
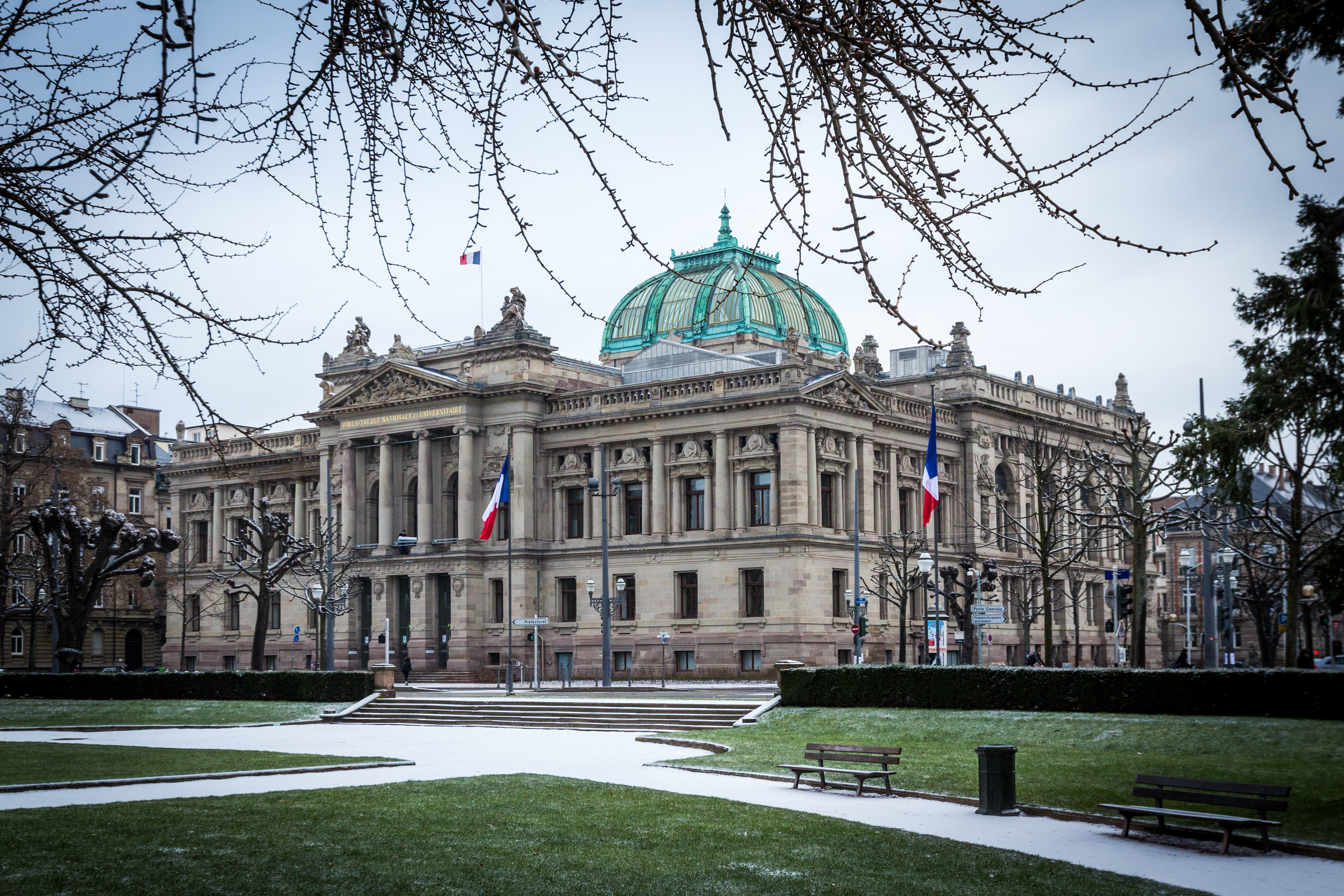
National Academic Library (Strasbourg)

The Bibliothèque nationale et universitaire (BNU) was built from 1889 until 1895, also in the neo-Renaissance style, again by Hartel and Neckelmann. It is classified as a monument historique since 2004.

=== Hôtel des impôts ===
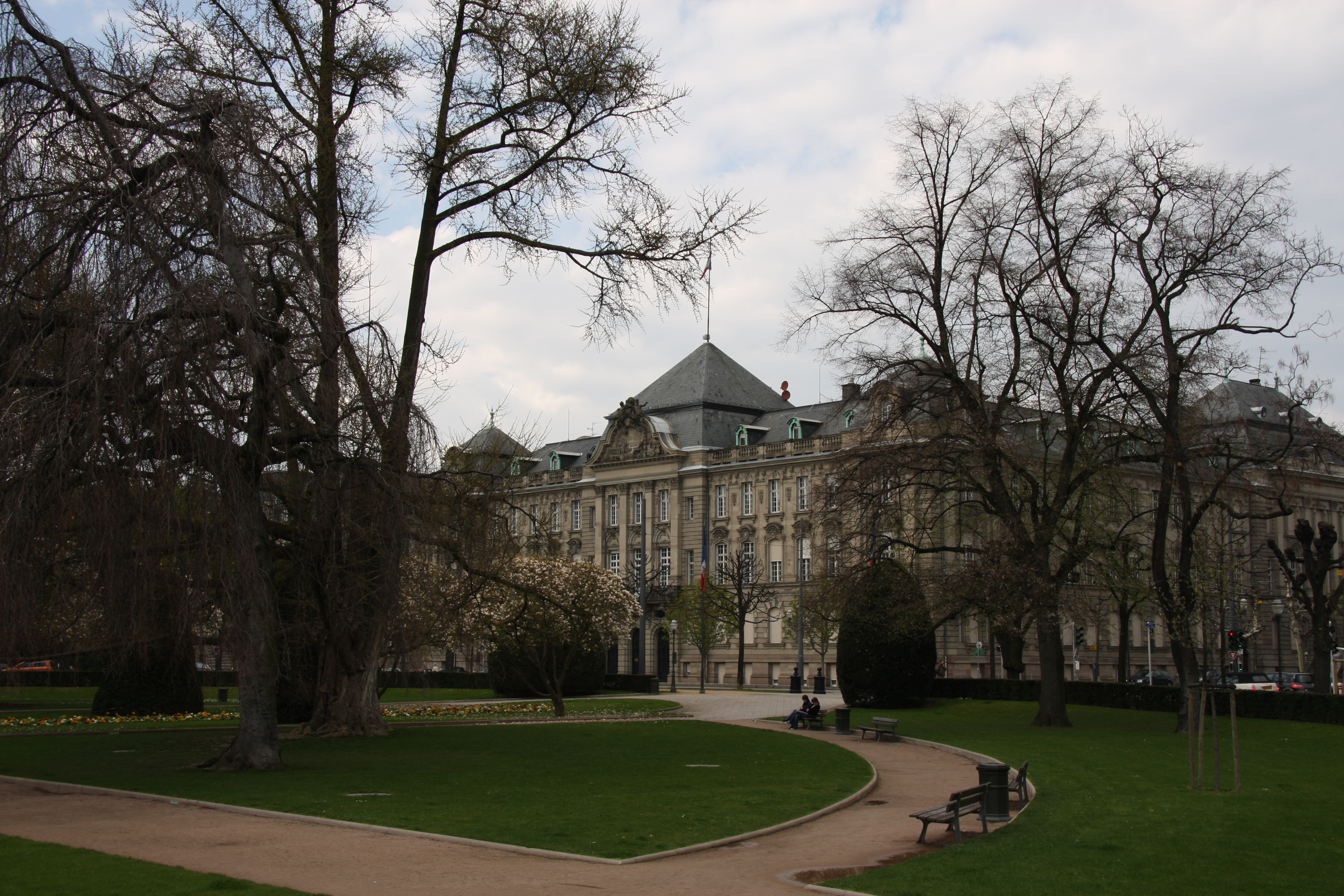
Hôtel des impôts

This Baroque Revival building was built from 1899 until 1902 by Ludwig Levy, the architect of the Great Synagogue of Strasbourg. It was originally used as the seat of several ministries: agriculture, infrastructure and finances. It is classified as a monument historique since 1996.

=== Préfecture ===
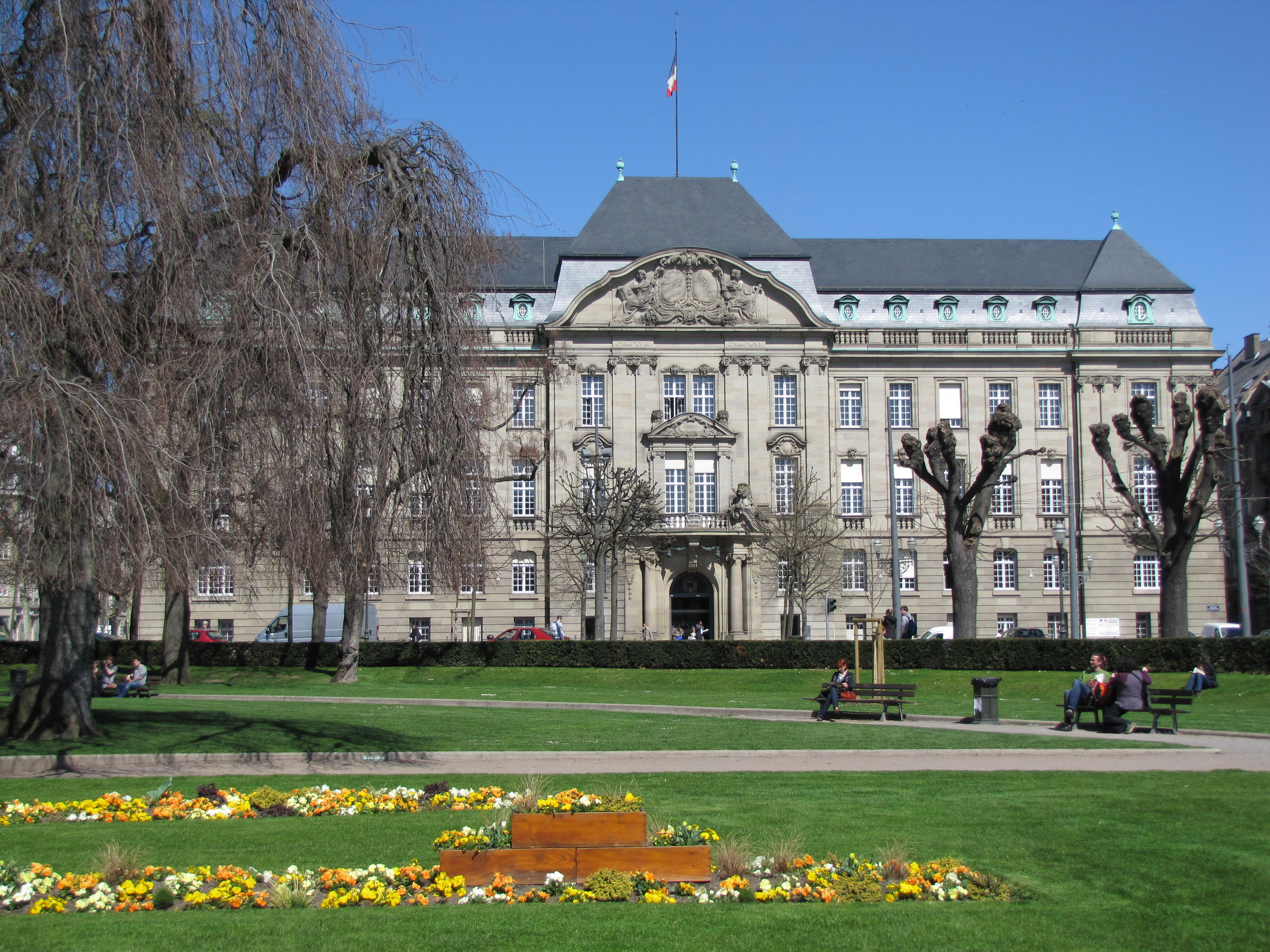
Préfecture

The Préfecture de la région Grand-Est et du département du Bas-Rhin (not to be confused with the residence of the prefect, the Hôtel du préfet) was built from 1907 until 1911, based on designs by Ludwig Levy. The façade was decorated with statues of lions by Alfred Marzolff. The building also housed ministries of Alsace-Lorraine. It is a more austere example of Baroque Revival architecture than its older counterpart. It is classified as a monument historique since 1996.

=== Aby Warburg Spiral ===
A work of art called Spirale Aby Warburg, le monument aux vivants ("Aby Warburg spiral, the monument to those who live") by Luxembourgish artist Bert Theis (1952–2016) was installed on the square in 2002. It can be and is used as a bench.

=== Pont du Théâtre ===
The Place de la République and the Grande Île city center are connected by the stone arch bridge Pont du Théâtre (1869–1870). That bridge was reinforced with concrete and partly modified in 1999–2000 in order to allow for the passage of the tramway (see below, "Transportation").

== Transportation ==
As of 2017, the Place de la République is served by the Strasbourg tramway lines B, C, E and F, and by the CTS buses 15a and 72.
