= Margaux (name) =

- Gender: Female
- Language: French
- Name day: January 12, February 3, July 17, July 20, October 16, November 16

Other names
- Alternative spelling: Margot, Margo

Margaux is a French feminine given name.

== Notable people ==
Notable people with the name include:

- Margaux Avril (born 1991), French singer
- Margaux Châtelier (born 1990), French actress
- Margaux Dietz (born 1990), Swedish blogger
- Margaux Farrell (born 1990), American swimmer
- Margaux Fragoso (1979–2017), American author
- Margaux Hemingway (1954–1996), American fashion model and actress
- Margaux Isaksen (born 1991), American modern pentathlete
- Margaux Pinot (born 1994), French judoka
- Margaux Sol (born 2008), French rhythmic gymnast
- Margaux Williamson (born 1976), Canadian painter, filmmaker, and writer

== See also ==
- Margeaux, Canadian entertainer
