= Ludwig Levy =

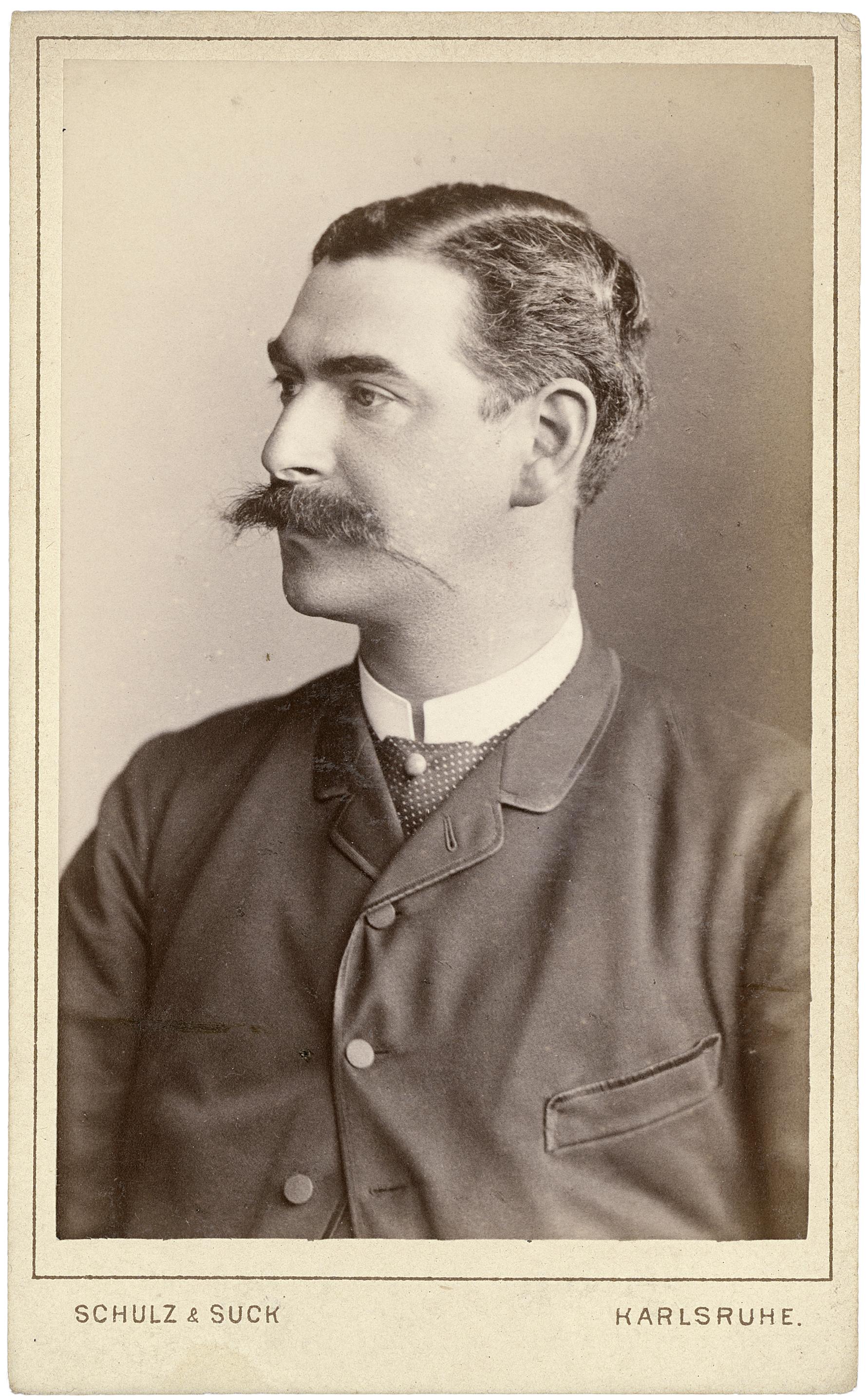
- portrait in 1886
- Born: 18 April 1854; Landau, Kingdom of Bavaria, a part of the German Confederation
- Died: 30 November 1907 (aged 53); Karlsruhe, Grand Duchy of Baden, a part of the German Empire
- Known for: Architecture
- Style: Historicism

Ludwig Levy (18 April 1854 – 30 November 1907) was a German Jewish architect of the Historicist school. He designed a number of synagogues, amongst which was the huge Neue Synagoge in Strasbourg, as well as official buildings such as the ministries of Alsace-Lorraine on the Kaiserplatz in that same town.

== Life and work ==
Levy was born in Landau, Palatinate (then belonging to the Kingdom of Bavaria), the sixth child of Jonas Levy, a textile trader from Herxheim, and Barbara Levy, née Machhol, from Edesheim. His older brother Heinrich was a district engineer in Landau. Attracted towards the same profession, Levy started studying mathematics and engineering in Karlsruhe in 1870, to the displeasure of his father who had wished for him to study medicine instead.

After obtaining his degree in engineering in 1875 at the Polytechnical school of Karlsruhe, Levy took classes in architecture in the same school for one year. Between 1876 and 1881, he trained with architects in Mainz and Frankfurt, before leaving for a ten-month journey of architectural studies through Italy. Back in Frankfurt in 1882, he became an assistant to Paul Wallot, the architect of the Reichstag building. He moved to Kaiserslautern later the same year, where he lived and worked as an independent architect until 1886.

In 1886, Ludwig Levy was named a professor at the Baugewerbeschule in Karlsruhe. He would remain in that town until his premature death from a heart attack at the age of 53. Levy married in 1890 and had two children, a daughter, Marie Babette (born 1891), and a son, Erwin Walter (born 1896). Levy's widow Flora, née Levinger, died in the Theresienstadt concentration camp on 23 April 1943, aged 74. By this time, both their children had been dead as well, leaving no descendants. The family's former house in Karlsruhe was destroyed during World War II.

From 1902 until his death, in addition to his post as a professor, Levy held the positions of Bautechnischer Referent and Baurat in the Ministry of the Interior of the Grand Duchy of Baden.

During his career, Levy designed a number of grand synagogues in Strasbourg, Kaiserslautern, Pforzheim, Rostock, Barmen, Bingen, Baden-Baden, Luxembourg City, and many other places. Almost all of these were destroyed by the Nazis during and after "Kristallnacht". Most of the villas, churches and administrative buildings designed by Levy have survived, such as the church in Olsbrücken, the villa Böhm in Neustadt an der Weinstraße, etc. The Protestant church of Bexbach (1888–1889) is today colloquially known as the "Levy-Kirche".

== Gallery ==
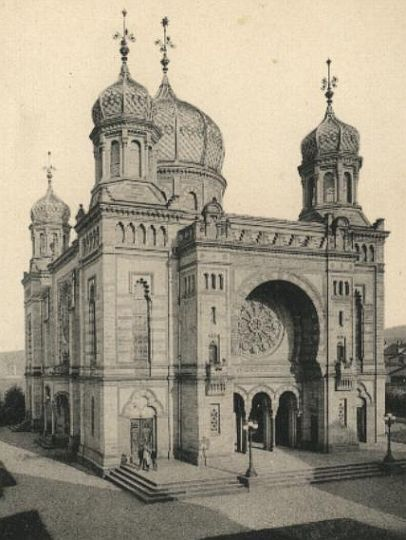
Synagogue of Kaiserslautern (1886)

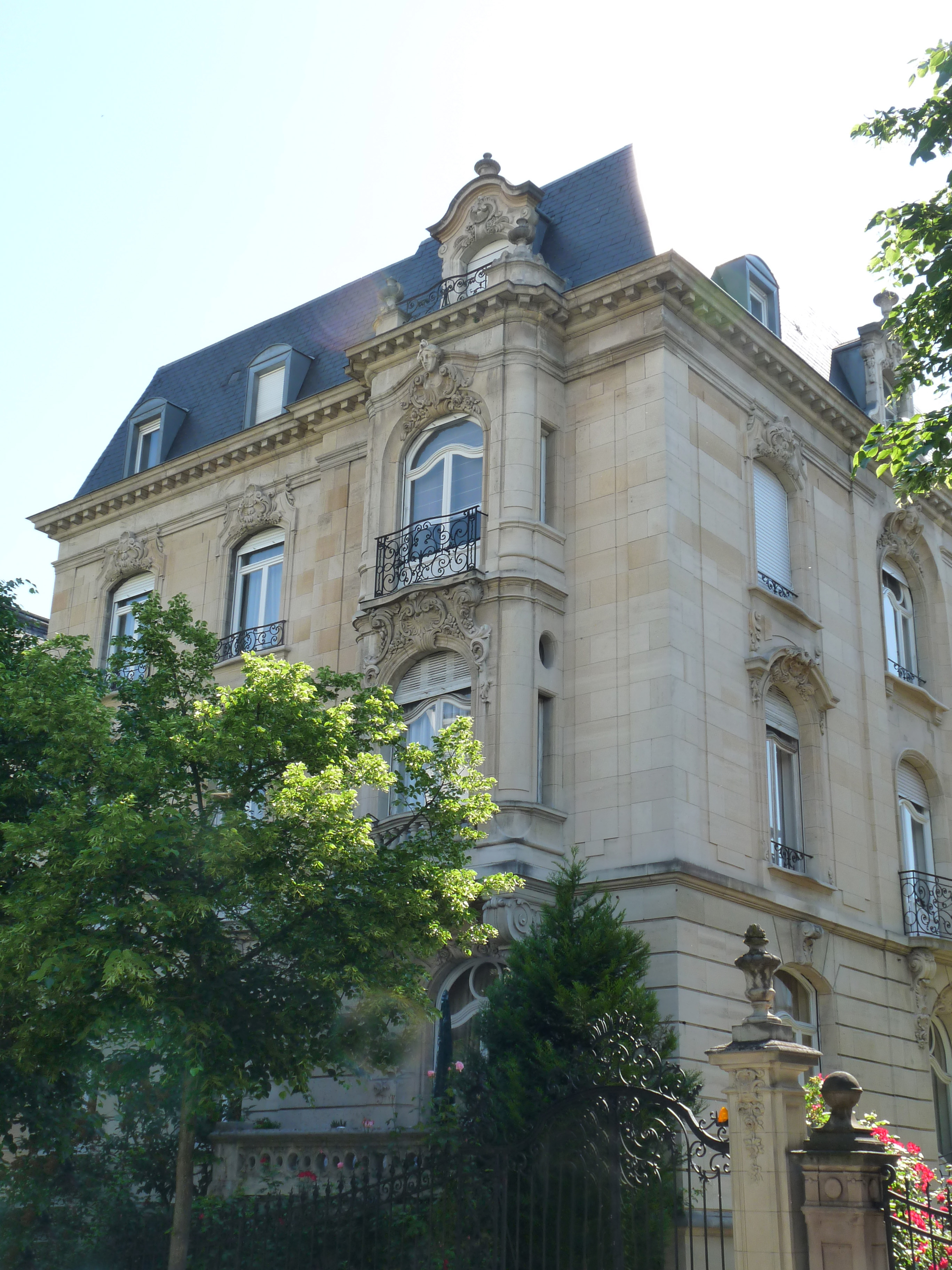
Villa Levi (no relation) in Strasbourg (1891)

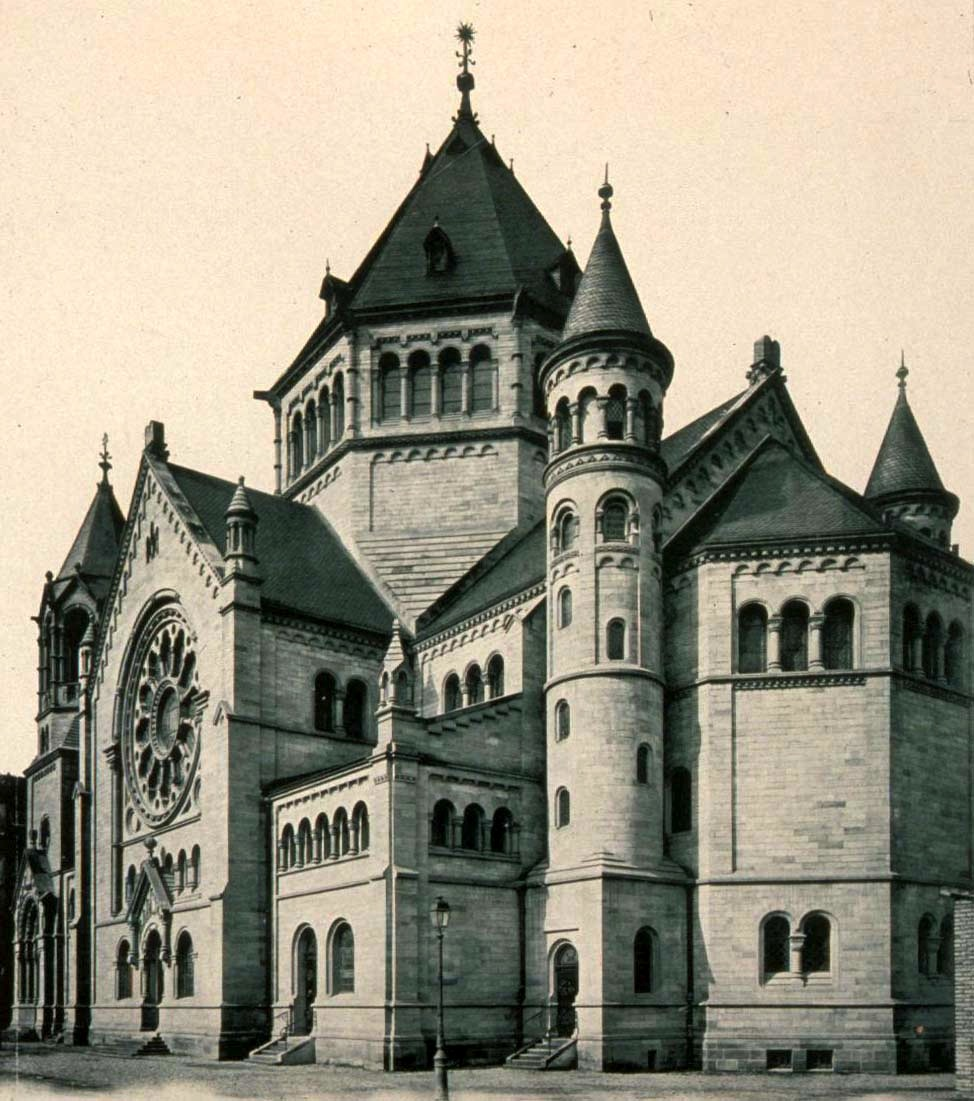
New Synagogue of Strasbourg (1895–1898)

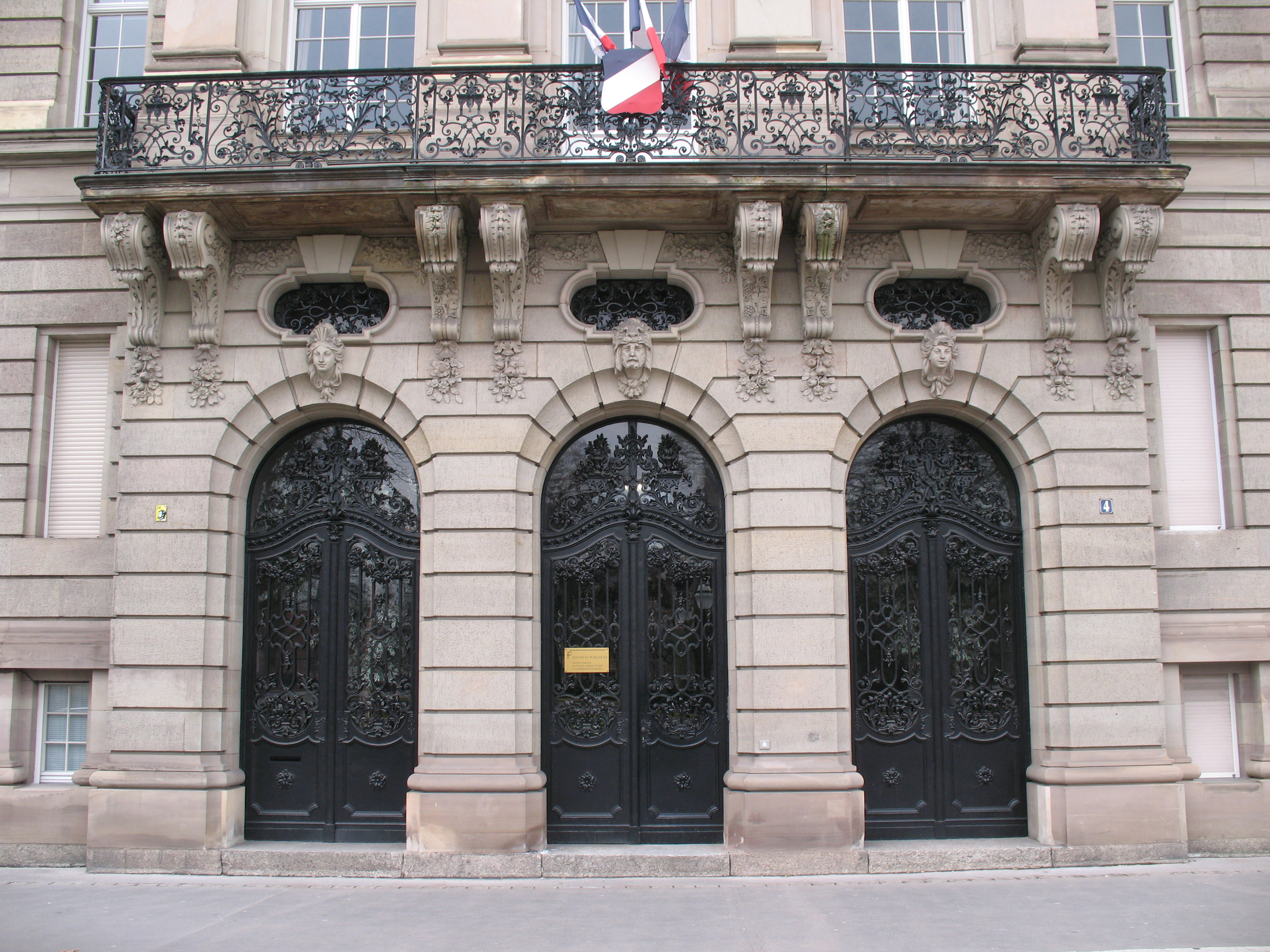
Portal of Hôtel des impôts, Strasbourg (former ministries of Alsace-Lorraine, built 1899–1902)

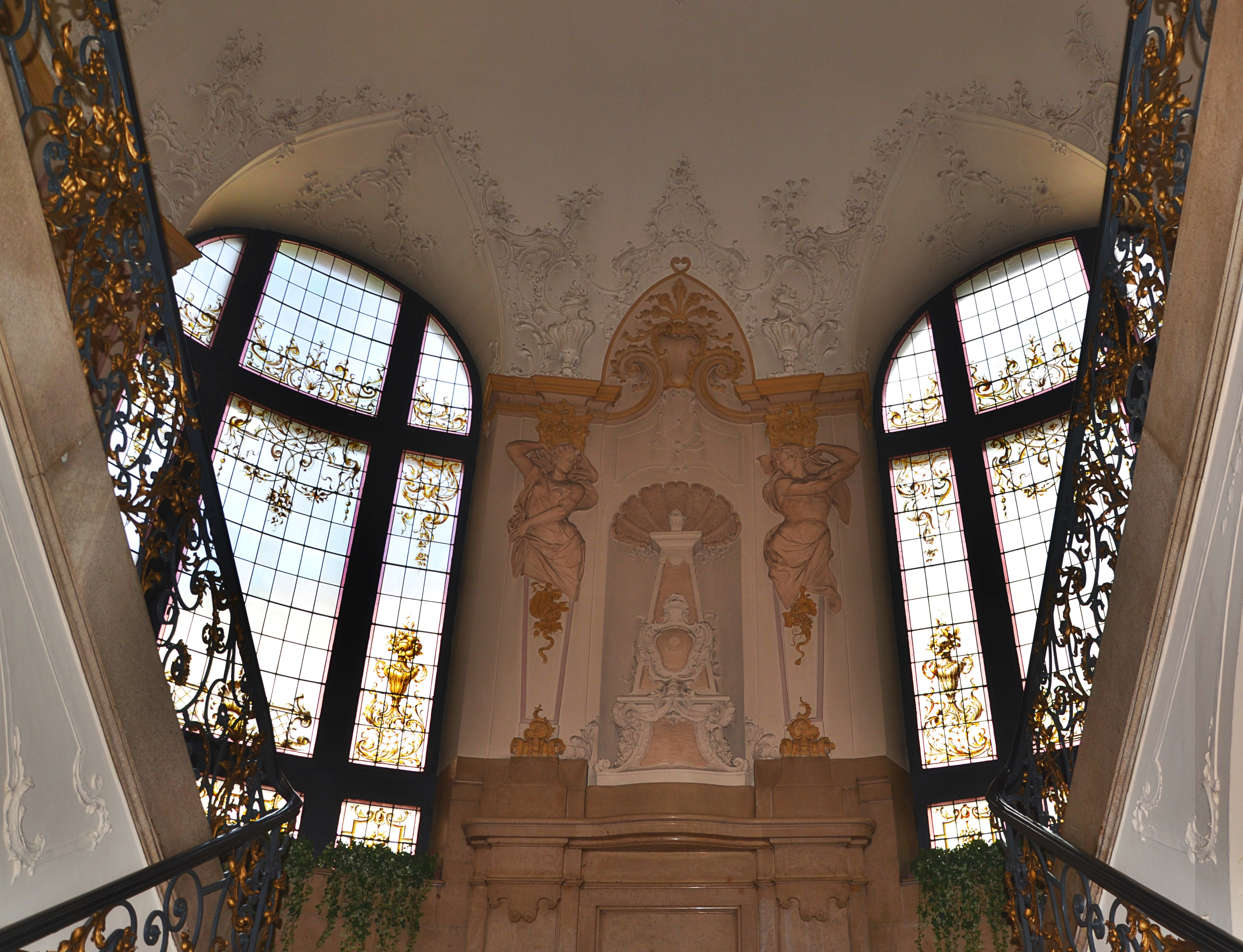
Staircase in Hôtel des impôts

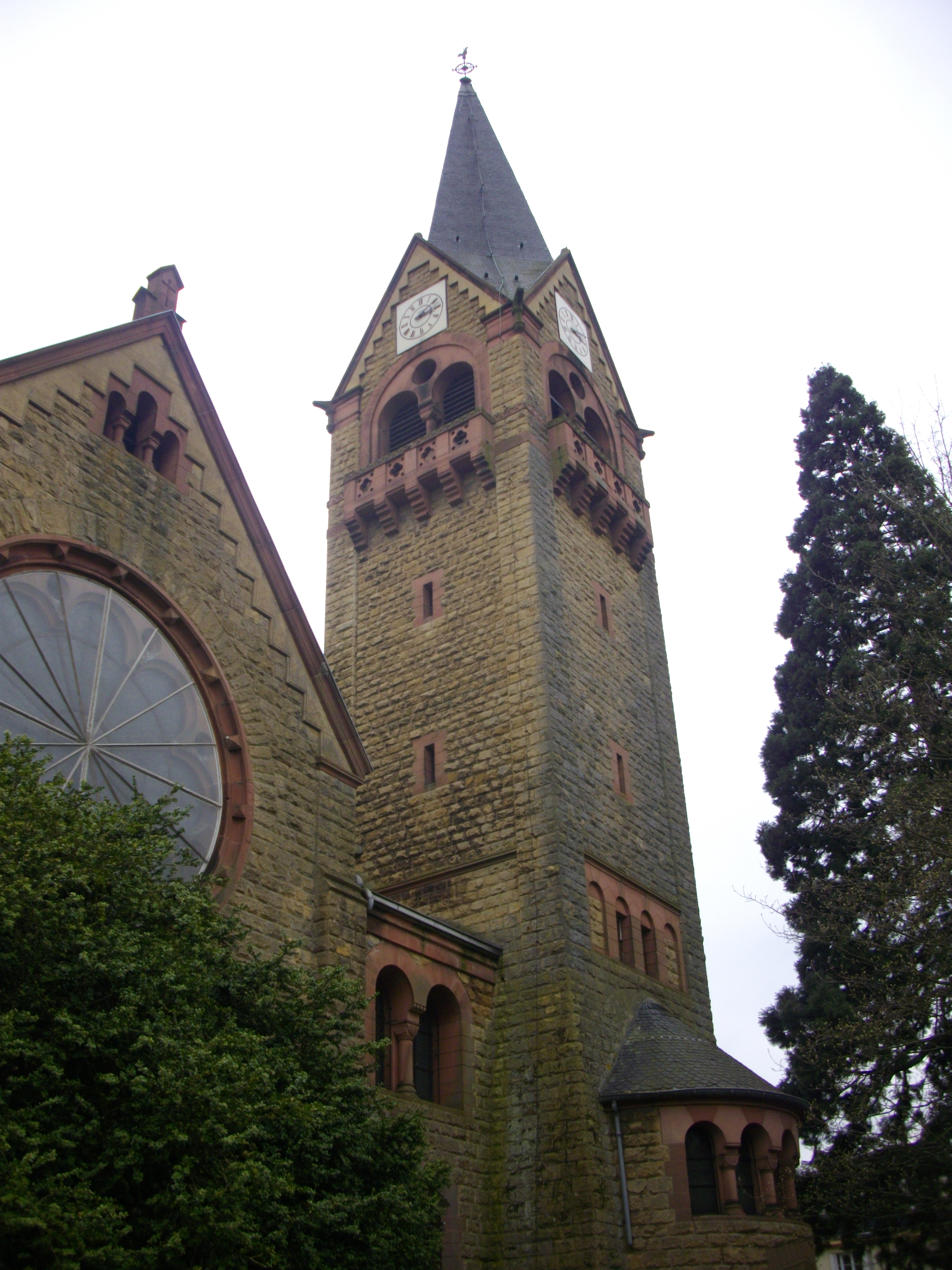
Protestant church in Metz (1901–1904)

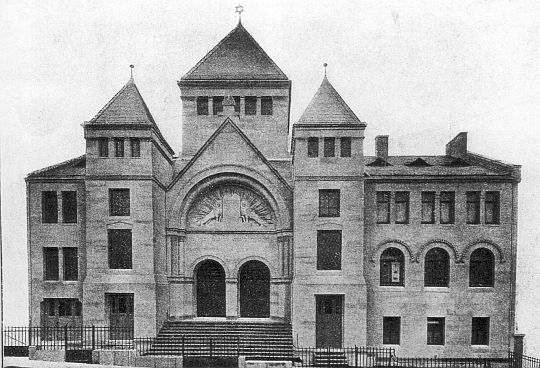
Synagogue in Bingen (1903–1905)

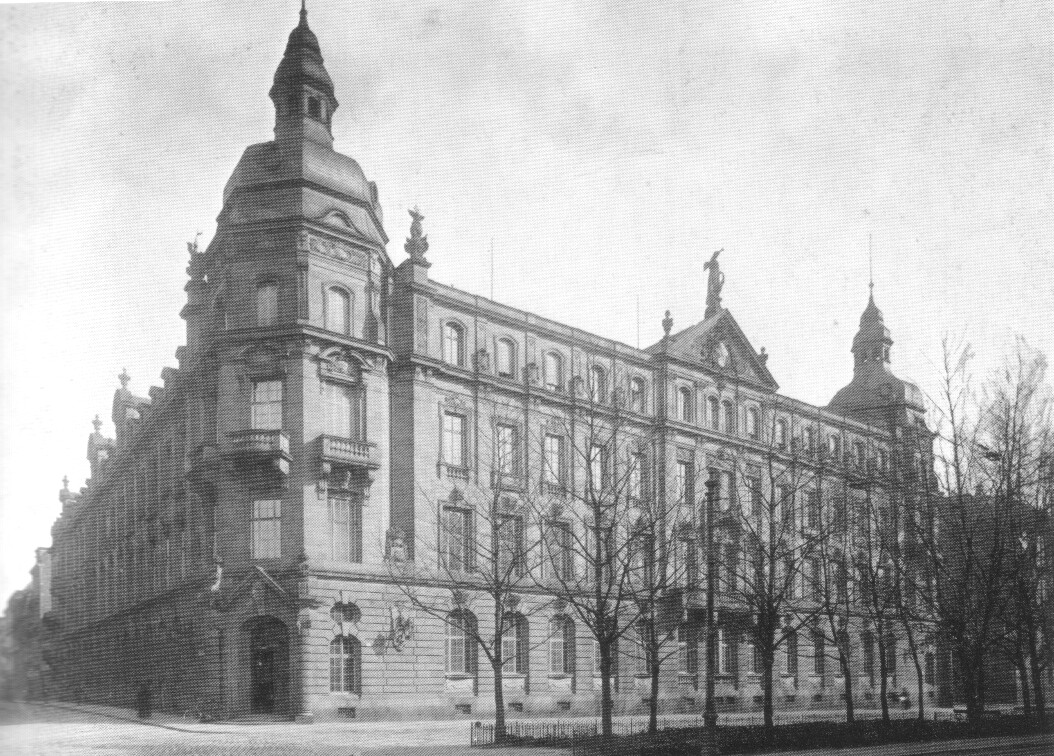
Grand Ducal local administration (Großherzogliches Bezirksamt) in Mannheim (1906)
