= Facing History and Ourselves =

US-based non-profit organization

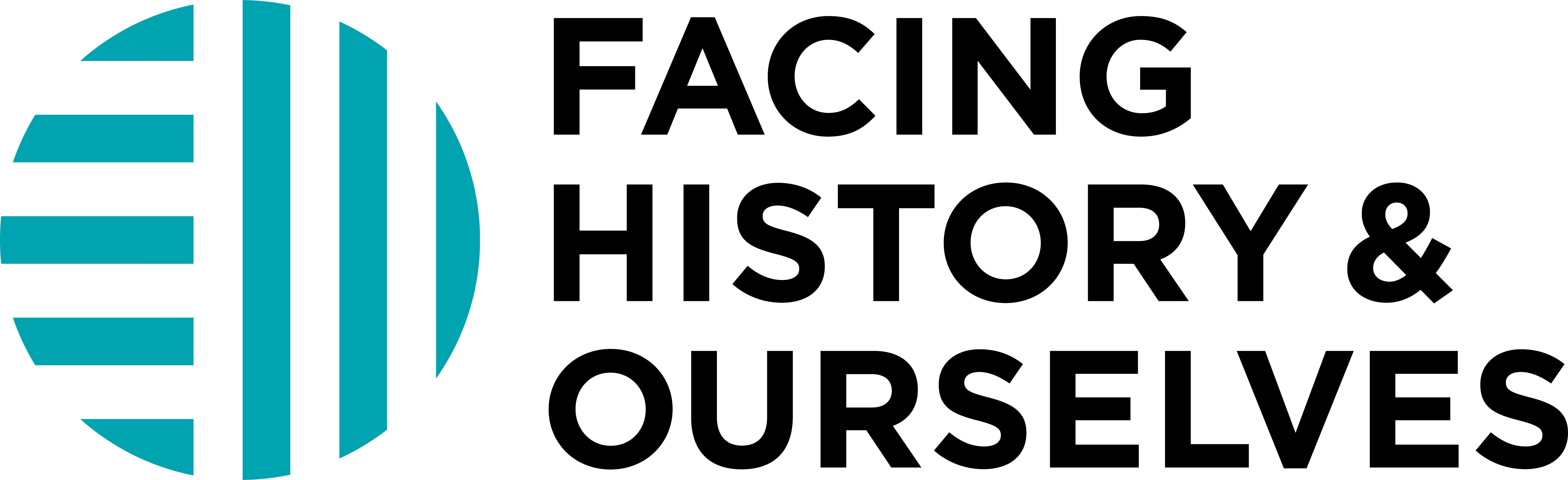
- Formation: 1976; 50 years ago
- Founder: Margot Stern Strom (co-founder) William S. Parson (co-founder)
- Type: Nonprofit
- Purpose: Social justice Education
- Headquarters: Boston, Massachusetts, U.S.
- Region served: United States; Canada; Israel; Northern Ireland; South Africa; China
- Key people: Desmond Blackburn, President and CEO
- Affiliations: Bill & Melinda Gates Foundation
- Staff: 180
- Website: www.facinghistory.org

Facing History & Ourselves is a global non-profit organization founded in 1976. The organization's mission is to "use lessons of history to challenge teachers and their students to stand up to bigotry and hate." The organization is based in Boston, Massachusetts, with 180 staff members in the main office and in other U.S. states.

== Work ==
Since the late 1970s, the group claims to have trained over 10,000 teachers, who have taught over half a million students in the U.S. and Canada. The curriculum is now also used in Israel, Northern Ireland, South Africa and China. Most of their revenue comes from grants and contributions. The teaching workshops, seminars, guest speakers, and resource materials are funded by the contributions and gifts. Contributors that donate $100,000 or more are placed into FHAO's Sustaining Gift Program, which currently includes over 86 families and foundations. The Bill and Melinda Gates Foundation donated over $200,000 for the implementation of common-core standards in July 2013.

== Curriculum ==
The course is aimed at middle school and high school students. In the classroom, students take part in group discussions and use primary source material to learn about different historical events. The curriculum aims to create a history course with a reflective component, allowing students to think about modern day prejudices.

The semester-long class starts with learning about the impact of the individual in society and how one is affected by his or her environment and culture. Students then learn about governments and the roles citizens play in their nation, and talk about the effects of bystanders in society. Classes gradually move into talking about dehumanization and how different societal groups can turn against each other, threatening a democracy.

The course is taught by looking into racial segregation in the United States. Students also learn about the Armenian genocide, Cambodian Genocide, and the history of Native Americans and Japanese Americans in the USA. The final subject focused on is antisemitism and Nazi Germany.

The course aims to connect the events with the students' lives by calling for reflection. Students are asked to think about familiar subjects such as peer pressure, conformity, and belongingness. The course's goal is to help students realize their role in society, and to promote global citizenship so that future events like the ones discussed can be prevented.

== Programs ==
Facing History offers professional development programs for educators interested in teaching the subject. To meet local, state, or national mandates, the organization works with the school district. The course also meets Common Core Standards by offering resources and professional development, using primary source material. The organization has been working longest with Boston Public Schools and has developed units for their civics and history curricula for grades 8-11. They also work with departments of education to meet their individual standards as well.

Working with high school and middle school teachers, they are taught how to lead group discussions, introduce controversial topics, and establish a classroom environment necessary for the course. Facing History provides online courses divided into single week sessions, which include group discussions, videos, and conference calls. In addition to working with individual educators, the organization also goes to schools and school districts to lead seminars and programs. After attending a seminar, taking an online course, or participating in a workshop, teachers have access to a free online lending library and individual coaching, and can book guest speakers for the classroom.

Educator resources on the group's website include lesson plans, readings, study guides, teaching strategies, library resources, videos, and project ideas. The readings are broken down into the topics of antisemitism, the Armenian Genocide, the Civil Rights Movement, democracy, eugenics, genocide and collective violence, the Holocaust, human rights, human behavior, and immigration.

The organization has chosen not to provide resources dealing with the Gaza war, leading to dissent among its staffers.

== Staff ==
Desmond K. Blackburn became president and CEO in 2023 after the retirement of his predecessor, Roger Brooks, who served from 2014 to 2023. Brooks was formerly Dean of the Faculty and Chief Academic Officer at Connecticut College. Margot Stern Strom, the executive director, cofounded with William S. Parsons (later Chief of Staff at the United States Holocaust Memorial Museum) the organization in 1976 and received the Charles A. Dana Award for Pioneering Achievements in Education on November 5, 1997, in New York City.

== Effectiveness ==
The group's evaluation department claims to have performed over 140 studies which show the program to be effective and beneficial to students. In 2006 the Institute of Education Sciences of the United States Department of Education released a WWC intervention report. It evaluated eight studies conducted by FHAO, and seven did not meet WWC evidence standards and reservations. When evaluating the studies, WWC did not notice statistical significance in knowledge, attitudes, and values.

The one study that did meet standards showed primary outcomes of relationship maturity, ethnic identity, civic attitudes and participation, racism, and moral reasoning. The study suggested that, in a group of 346 eighth grade students, Facing History positively affected their maturity level and made them less racist. It did not show significant change in students' moral reasoning. Difference in change of ethical reasoning was slightly significant from a pre-test to a post-test.

Since then, Facing History & Ourselves has undergone two randomized controlled trials both of which showed that the program had positive effects. For instance, students who participated in it grew significantly in their empathy and prosocial behavior, and had stronger participatory citizenship beliefs compared to non-Facing History students.

Holocaust scholar Deborah Lipstadt wrote in 1995 that FHAO's approach is not effective, especially in terms of what she viewed as the unjustified parallels it draws between the antisemitism of Germany in the 1930s and other forms of racism existing in contemporary America and other places.

== See also ==
- Holocaust education
