= Margot Wicki-Schwarzschild =

German Holocaust witness (1931–2020)

Margot Wicki-Schwarzschild (born 1931 in Kaiserslautern, died 29 December 2020 in Basel) was a German survivor and a Holocaust witness. She survived two internment camps in France.

== Life ==
Her father Richard Jakob Schwarzschild, born 12 December 1898 in Kaiserslautern, was of Jewish heritage, and her mother Aloisia, "Luise", née Keim, born 3 January 1909 in Passau, was Catholic. She had a sister: Hannelore Schwarzschild (1929–2014). The family celebrated both Christian and Jewish holy days. The family lived in Steinstraße 30 in Kaiserslautern. In 1938 her father was transported to the Dachau concentration camp for six weeks under protective custody. When he returned, he was not allowed to discuss what had happened to him there. Around the same time, the family had to move into a Judenhaus and Margot (seven years old) and her sister were expelled from their school.

The Synagogue of Kaiserslautern, where her father regularly played the organ was destroyed in September or October 1938.

In the early morning of 22 October 1940, the Gestapo deported the entire family to the French Camp de Gurs in the Pyrenees. "Hunger, lice, bugs, fleas and rats were just as much a part of everyday life as the omnipresent mud." In 1941 Wicki-Schwarzschild was transferred to Camp de Rivesaltes with her mother and sister. In November of the same year, the two sisters came to a home run by the Children's Aid of the Swiss Red Cross in Pringy in Haute-Savoie. Her father was able to rent a small apartment near Carcassonne in semi-freedom and brought the family home. In 1942 they were again deported to Rivesaltes, where the family was separated. Her father was deported to the Auschwitz concentration camp in 1943 and murdered there. With the help of Friedel Bohny-Reiter, a sister of the Swiss Red Cross, and with a photograph of her communion, her mother was able to save herself and her daughters from deportation. An article by Sister Hannelore about the conditions in the camp was sent to a Jewish newspaper in Switzerland. A Swiss teacher read this report and sent the family food parcels.

After the fall of the Nazi regime, Margot, her mother and sister went back to Kaiserslautern. The sisters would have preferred to stay in France as they hardly spoke any German. They went to the boy scouts and their stories impressed the young Erhard Roy Wiehn so much that he decided to study sociology and research the fate of survival. After leaving school, Wicki-Schwarzschild trained as a translator and interpreter. She found work at the American headquarters, then in a Jewish agency in Geneva.

She married Josef Wicki. The couple had children and grandchildren. In 1961 they moved to Reinach where Wicki-Schwarzschild began to report on her experiences in schools and became a Holocaust witness. She also accompanied school classes on trips to Gurs, together with other contemporary witnesses such as Eva Mendelsson and Paul Niedermann. Wicki-Schwarzschild also published a number of memorial texts.
