= Margot MacGibbon =

Australian violinist & teacher (1906–1998)

- Born: 13 March 1906; Castlemaine, Victoria, Australia
- Died: 4 September 1998 (aged 92); London, England, UK
- Education: Royal Academy of Music
- Occupations: Violinist; teacher
- Known for: The MacGibbon Quartet (founder and leader)
- Spouse: Frederick Jackson (married 1931)

Margot MacGibbon (13 March 1906 – 4 September 1998) was an Australian violinist and teacher, who was in the "top echelons" of chamber musicians. Her MacGibbon string quartet existed for almost 50 years.

== Early life ==
Margot MacGibbon was born in Castlemaine, Victoria, Australia on 13 March 1906. As a child, she received lessons from her aunt in both piano and violin, before settling on the latter and performing solo in local concerts.

In 1927, MacGibbon was awarded an Associated Board Scholarship to the Royal Academy of Music in London. She studied violin with Spencer Dyke, piano with Frank Britton, and harmony with Harry Farjeon. Later, she studied under the pianist Clifford Curzon, and violin with Sascha Lasserson. While at the academy, she won a number of prizes, and while still a student was made sub-professor in ensemble playing.

In 1931 she married Frederick Jackson, who she had met while at the Royal Academy of Music. Jackson was a pianist and choirmaster. Following their marriage, the couple toured Europe, Australia, and New Zealand - described as "musically inseparable". He died in 1972, while conducting a performance.

== Career ==
MacGibbon formed her string quartet in 1936, going on to perform regularly around the UK, and frequently broadcast on the BBC. The MacGibbon Quartet gave regular concert series at London's Conway Hall from 1936 to 1969. As well as in her own quartet, MacGibbon performed many times with others over the course of her career, including with well-known ensembles such as the English Chamber Orchestra.

She was a founding member of the London Mozart Players under Harry Blech. Blech praised MacGibbon as an excellent player, saying: “I always liked to have her near the front".

The Musical Times wrote that:

For Margot MacGibbon, versatility was both a professional strength and source of personal pride; but perfectionism of craft was no less central to her approach music.

In 1979, MacGibbon co-founded The Sascha Lasserson Memorial Trust, serving on the panel of adjudicators for the international Lasserson Memorial Violin Competition.

Margot MacGibbon continued playing into her nineties, even after suffering a stroke. She still taught, and prepared pupils for exams, at the age of 90.

She died in London on 4 September 1998. The Times remembered her as "a musician of formidable character, and natural talent", and "a tiny, colourful and complex person". In 1999, the Margot MacGibbon Award for an Australian violinist was established at the Royal Academy of Music, in her memory.
