= Synagogue du Quai Kléber =

Synagogue du Quai Kléber (Neue Synagoge)
- German: Synagoge am Kleberstaden
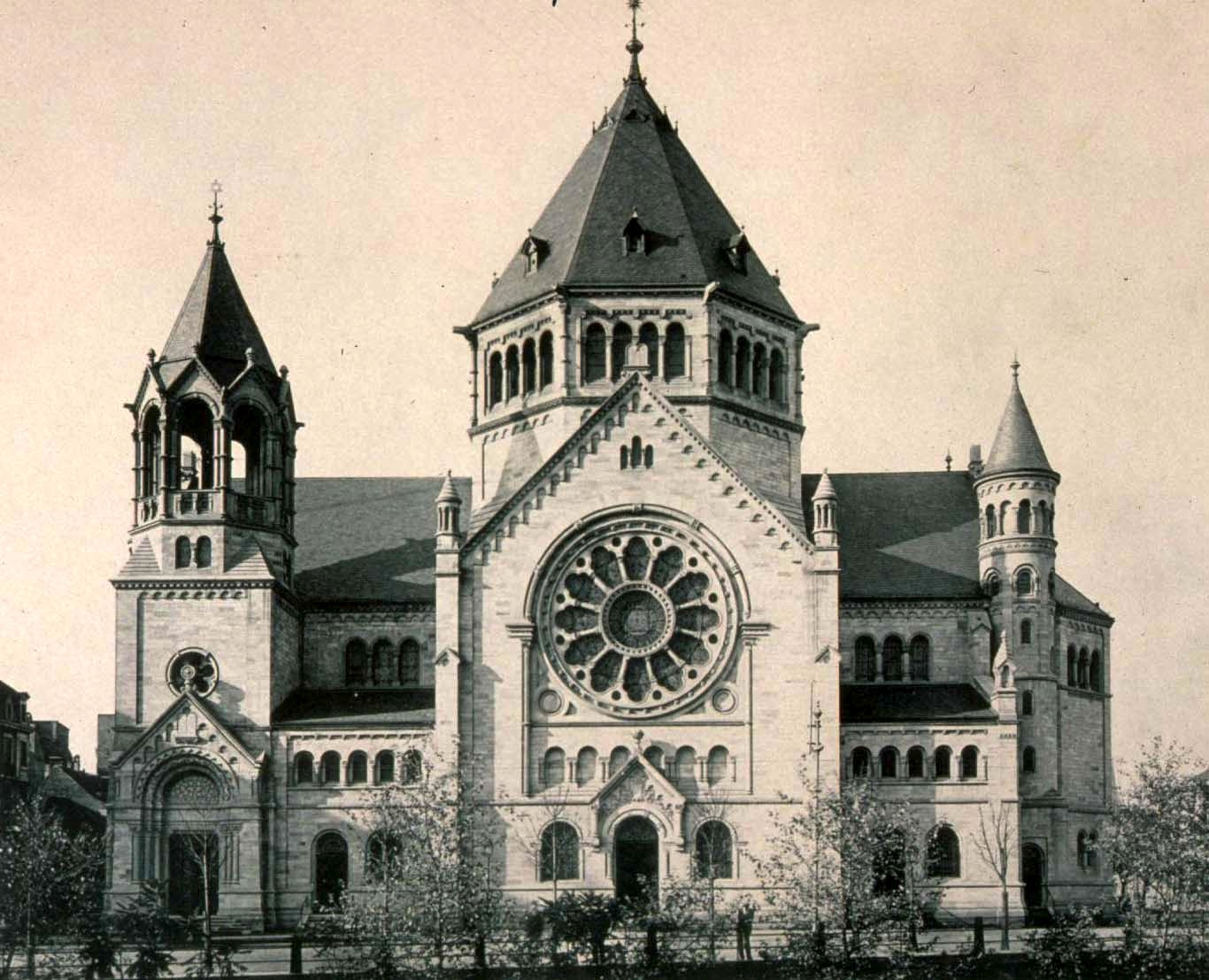
- Lateral view, seen from Canal du Faux-Rempart

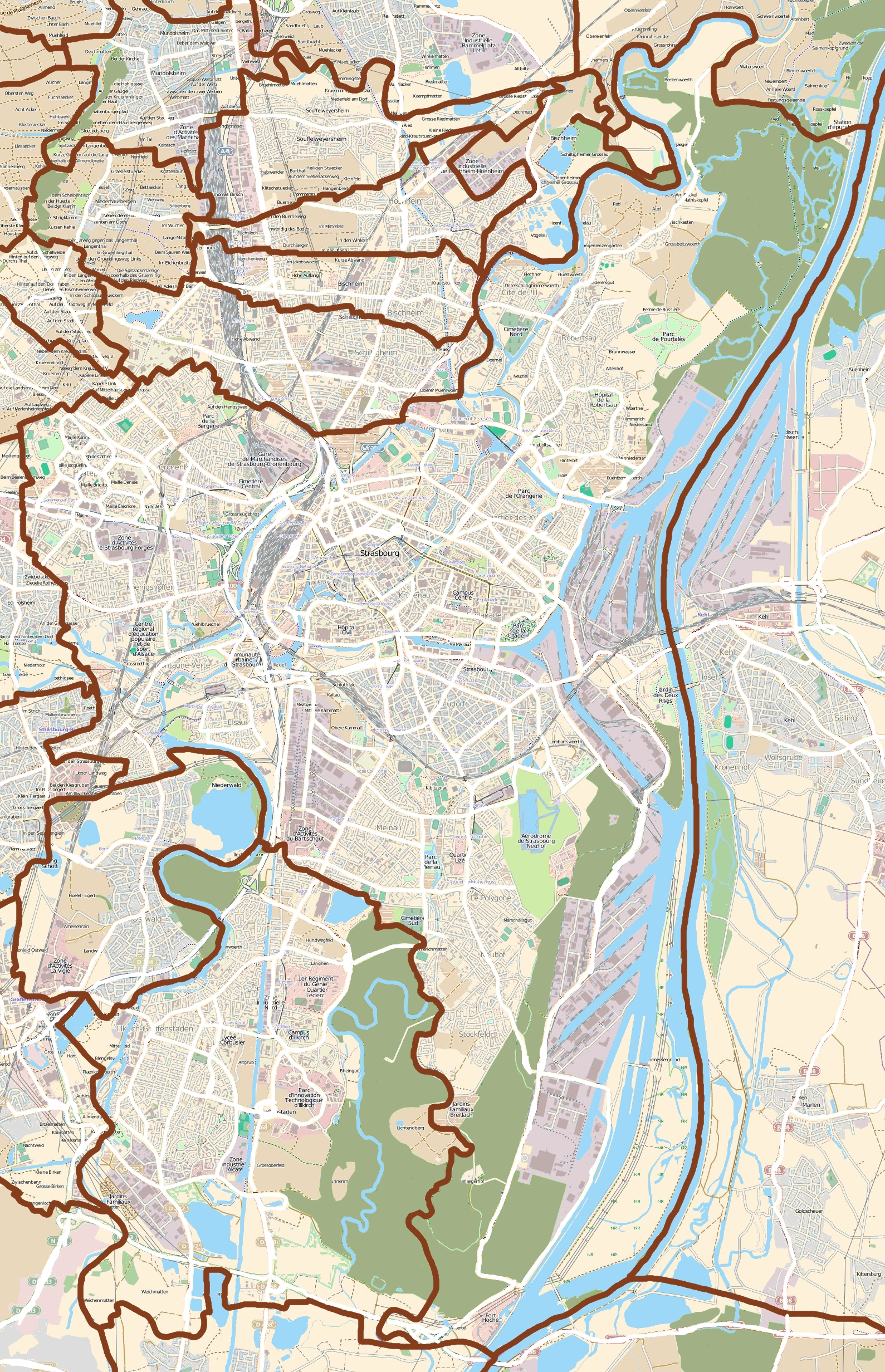
- Location of the former synagogue

Religion
- Affiliation: Judaism (former)
- Ecclesiastical or organisational status: Synagogue (1898-1940)
- Status: Destroyed

Location
- Location: Strasbourg
- Country: France
- Coordinates: 48°35′07″N 7°44′30″E

Architecture
- Architect: Ludwig Levy
- Type: Synagogue architecture
- Style: Romanesque Revival
- Groundbreaking: 1895
- Completed: 1898
- Construction cost: 800,000 Reichsmark
- Destroyed: 1940–1941

Specifications
- Capacity: 1,639 worshipers
- Length: 46 m (151 ft)
- Width (nave): 19 m (62 ft)
- Dome: One
- Dome height (outer): 54 m (177 ft)

The Synagogue du Quai Kléber (German: Synagoge am Kleberstaden, also formerly known as Neue Synagoge, "New Synagogue") was the main synagogue of Strasbourg, France before World War II. It was built in the "Neustadt" when the city was part of the German Empire (until 1918) and destroyed by Nazi Germany after it annexed the city in 1940; in the years between, Strasbourg and its Jewish community were French.

== History ==
The synagogue was designed by Ludwig Levy (1854–1907) and built from 1895 until 1898 at a final cost of 800,000 Reichsmark. The imposing Romanesque Revival building was inspired by the Imperial Cathedrals of Mainz, Speyer, and Worms, all located in the Rhine region, like Strasbourg.

The synagogue was built in pink and grey Vosges sandstone from the Phalsbourg quarries and crowned with a 54 m (177 ft) dome, which rivalled the neighbouring Saint-Pierre-le-Jeune Catholic Church. The main hall's nave was 46 m (151 ft) long and 19 m (62 ft) wide and had 1,639 seats on two levels: 825 for the men and 654 for the women; the space surrounding the ark contained 40 seats for the choir. A lateral oratory that was used on working days could accommodate 100 people. The main prayer room was equipped with a pipe organ made by Walcker Orgelbau, which was replaced in 1925 by an instrument by Edmond Alexandre Roethinger.

After the 1940 victory over France, the Nazis annexed Alsace. The synagogue was first entirely plundered, then burnt to the ground. The destruction by arson was the work of a group of Hitler Youths from Baden and Alsace and occurred during the night of 30 September/ 1 October 1940; a first deliberate fire had already been lit on 12 September. What remained of the walls was totally razed in 1941.. The Nazis compelled the insurer of the synagogue to make payment of the damages to them instead of the congregation.

A first memorial to the synagogue was inaugurated in 1976 near the place where it once stood. That memorial was expanded in 1994, and the tramway station nearby was given the name Ancienne Synagogue Les Halles. In 2012, the perimeter of the memorial was expanded again to include a newly created Allée des Justes-parmi-les-Nations dedicated to the Righteous Among the Nations. The 1994 memorial was knocked down by a car in March 2019 in what was first suspected to be a deliberate act but was later ruled to be an accident; it has been restored since.

== Gallery ==
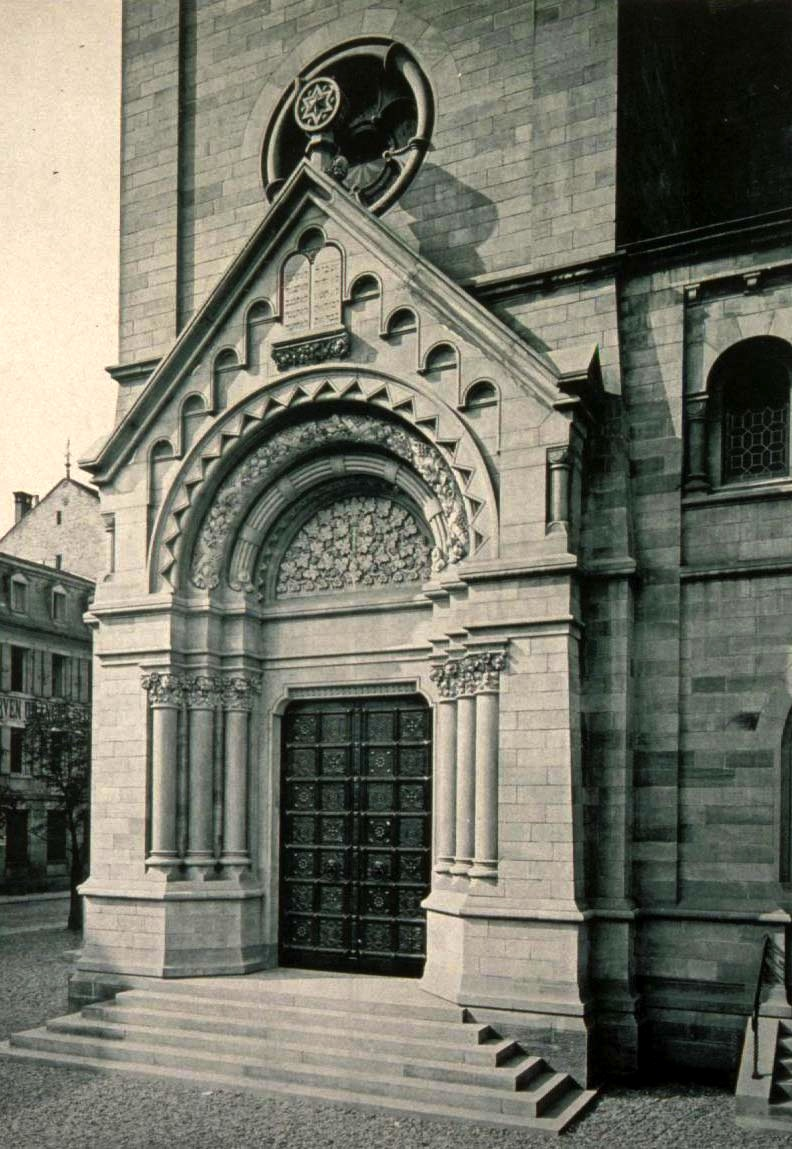
Main portal, with Star of David and Tablets of Stone

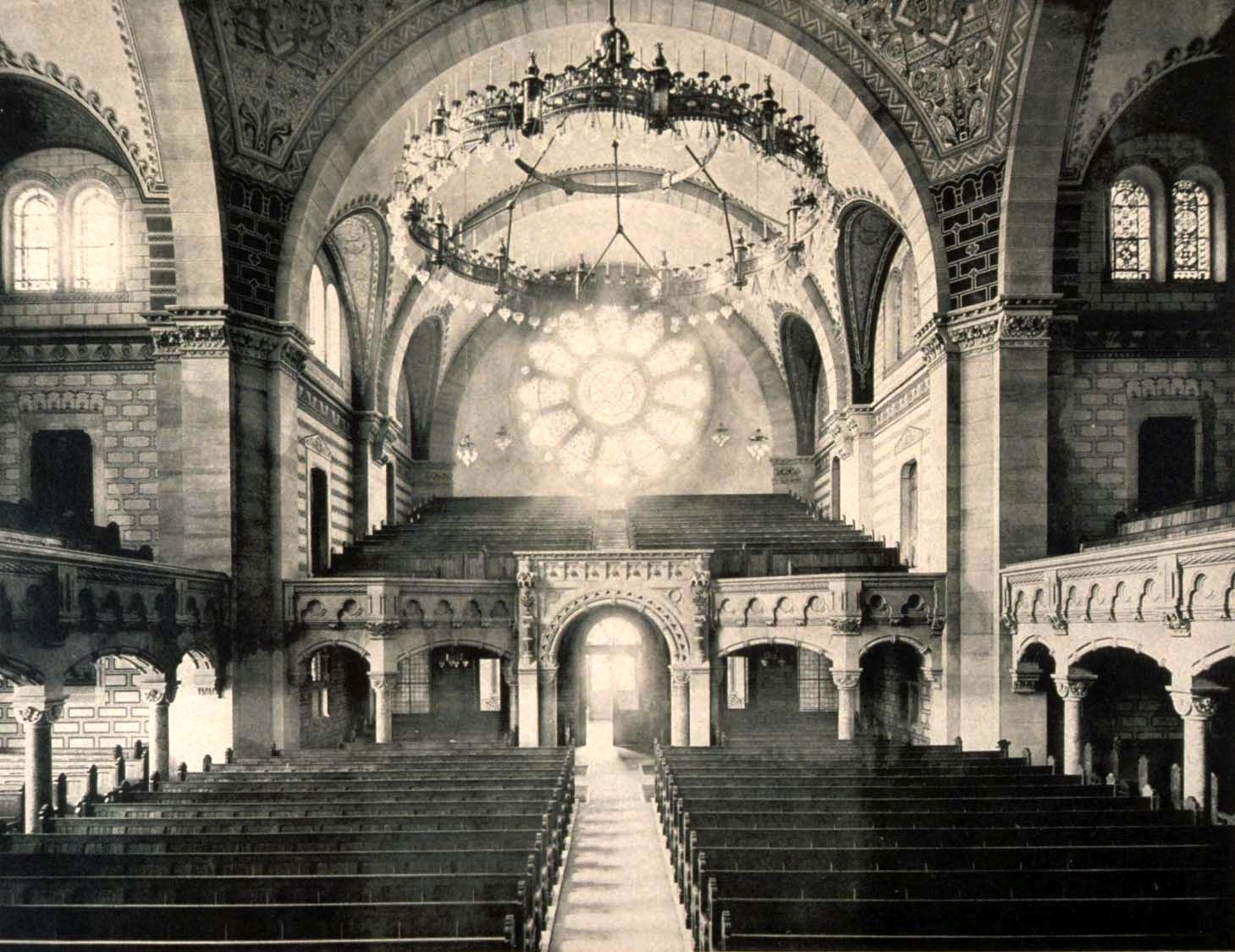
Interior looking west

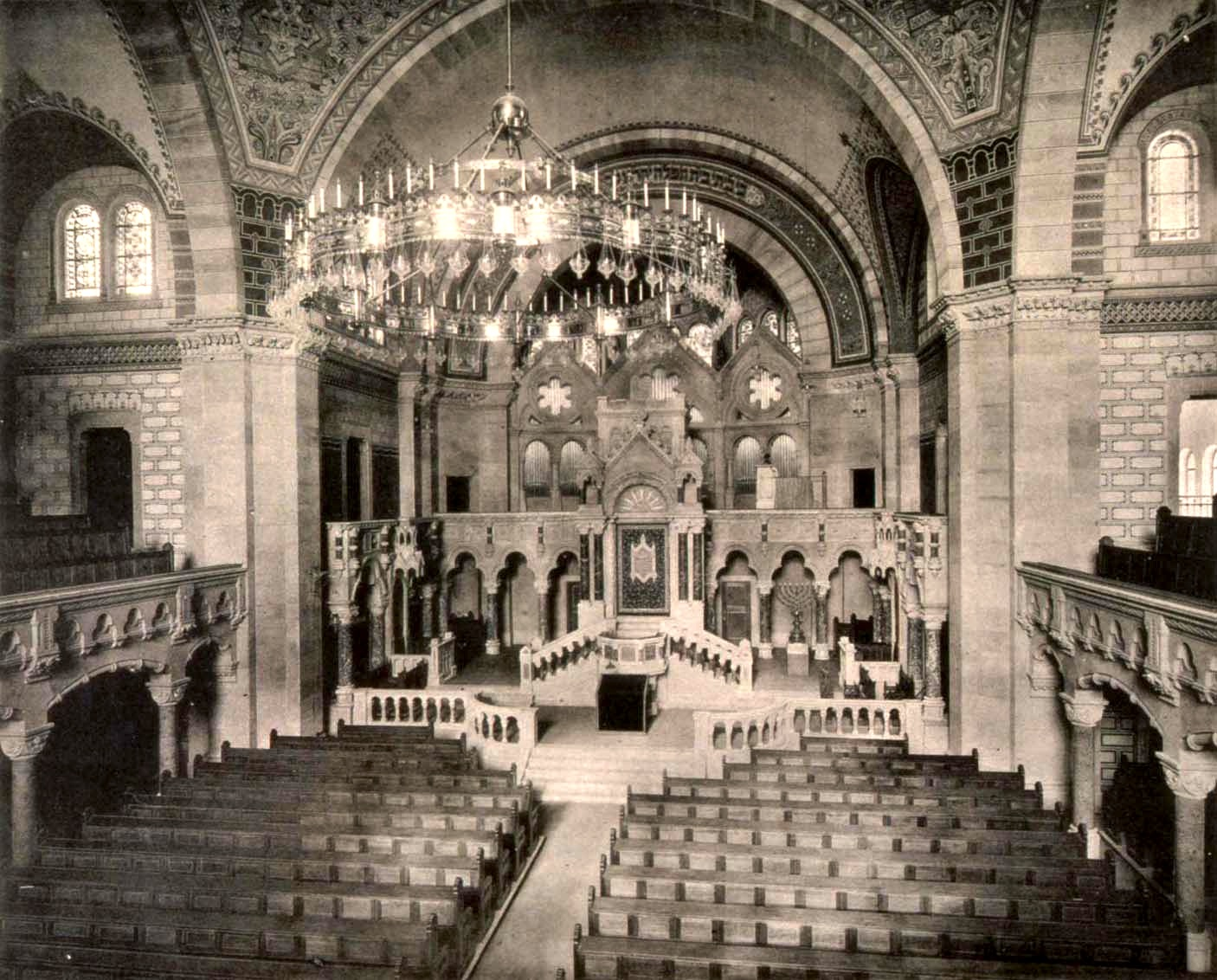
Interior looking east

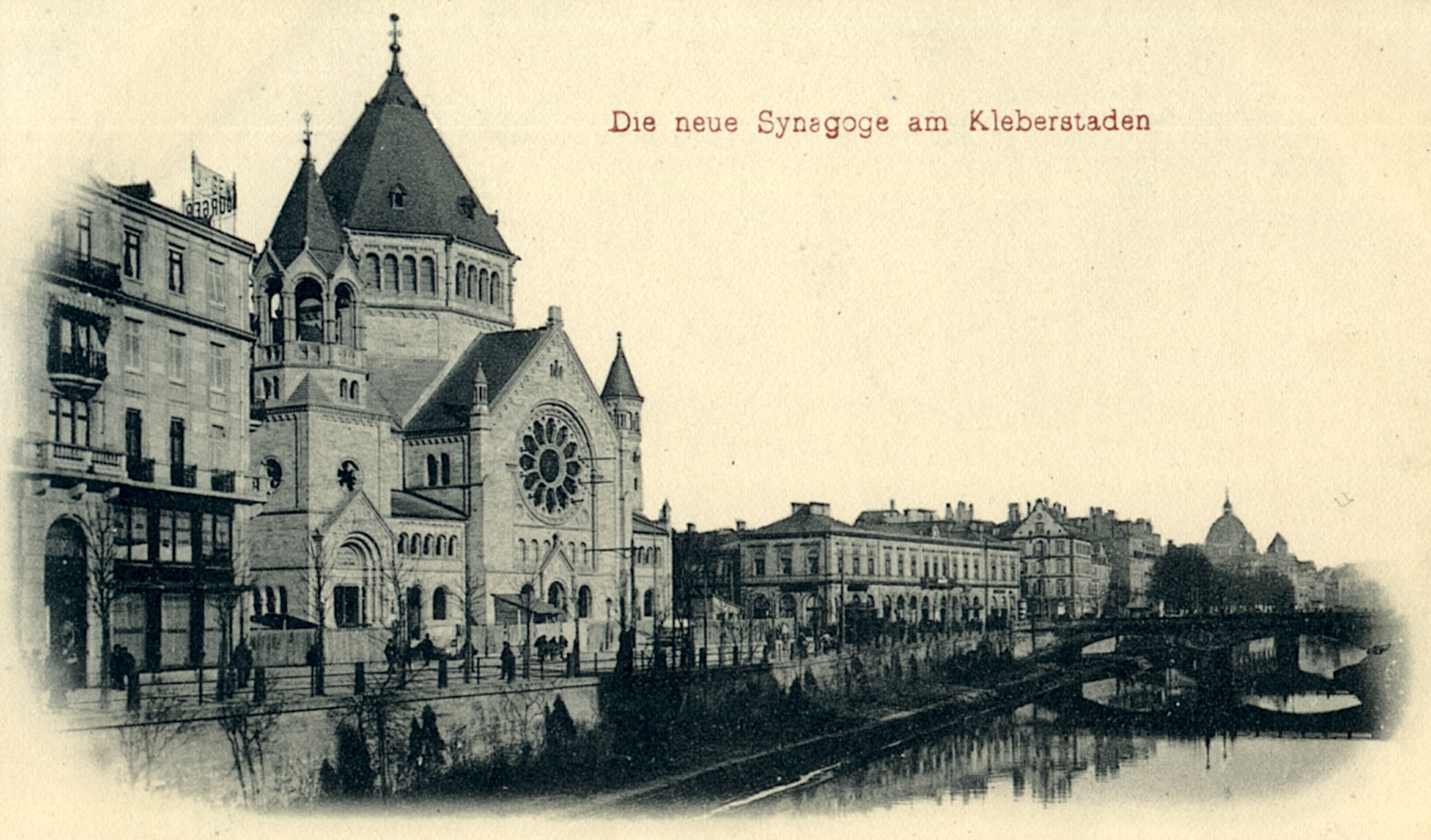
On a postcard, 1898

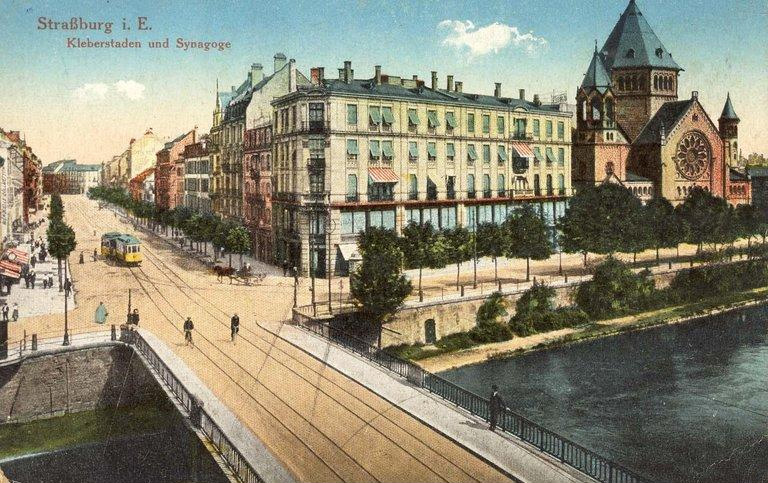
On a postcard, 1918
