= Margot Stern Strom =

American educator (1941–2023)

Margot Stern Strom (October 20, 1941 – 28 March 2023) was an American teacher. She was the cofounder of Facing History and Ourselves.

She was the author of the 1994 book Facing History and Ourselves: Holocaust and Human Behavior with William S. Parsons.
