= Margot Donald =

Australian photographer (1923–2005)

- Born: Margot Donald; 1 January 1923; Roseville, New South Wales, Australia
- Died: 28 August 2005 (aged 82); Sydney, New South Wales, Australia
- Occupations: Photographer, colourist
- Parent: William John Donald

Margot Moore (née Donald, 1 January 1923 – 28 August 2005) was an Australian photographer. She began her career in Sydney, and later made her way to London. She was a set designer, and also made backgrounds and portraits.

== Early life ==
Donald was born in the Sydney suburb of Roseville on 1 January 1923. Her father, William John Donald, was a cartoonist. When Margot was thirteen, she received her first Brownie camera from her father, and she quickly developed an interest in photography.

The work produced by the Hobberts studios had been described by Sydney Ure Smith, editor of the Home and Art in Australia, as chic and smart advertising... typical of the rapid growth and sophistication of commercial photography studios at the time.

== Career ==
=== 1939–1946 ===
Donald began work in 1939 as a junior colourist in the Russell Roberts Advertising Studio, Sydney. She moved to Falk Studios (founded by Walter Barnett) in 1942.

=== 1947–1949 ===
In 1940s returning servicemen reclaimed many of the traditional male roles within the workforce, although Donald kept her place at Russell Roberts until 1949. Whilst she was there she gained exposure and recognition for her commercial photography work. Her work can be seen in Australian Photography (1947), Photograms of the Year (1947) and Contemporary Photography (1949). In the 1940s Donald traveled to England, where she was employed at American Lintas Advertising Studios. Due to her experience Donald had a considerable advantage within the field of Commercial Photography having been exposed to it from a young age. Donald gained more experience within her chosen field of photography.

=== 1950s ===
In 1950s Donald returned to Australia and began working with colour film. During this period Donald married and worked as a commercial photographer.

== Collections ==
One of Donald's collections can be viewed in the National Gallery of Australia .

Donald's photographs Patricia and My Joy Gloves were taken in the early 1940s. They echo the then current influence of modernism in commercial photography and the new directions it was taking after the war. They present sharply focused subjects, softly modelled and highlighted with grand architectural geometric in the background.

== Death ==
Donald died in Sydney on 28 August 2005, at the age of 82.

== See also ==
- Olive Cotton
