= Margot Bennett =

Margot Bennett may refer to:

- Margot Bennett (writer) (1912–1980), Scottish writer of crime, thriller and science fiction novels
- Margot Bennett (actress) (born 1935), American publicist and former actress
