= Margot Day =

American singer-songwriter

Margot Day is a singer, flutist, songwriter, and poet. Day played with the band, The Plague, in the 1980s as part of the underground music scene in New York City. Day also played flute with Slow Walk 13, a conceptual music band, in 1982. In 1987, The Plague released a self-titled album and two years later, the band broke up. Day went on to release an eponymous album in 1997. In 1999, she released another album, Sacred.

In 2010 her six-piece group mOss circle self-published a self-titled CD, which Seven Days called "a lovingly crafted and mostly well-executed take on the genre" of fantasy rock. In 2018, she was playing with Kurtis Knight in a duo called Metamorph. 2019 Metamorph expanded to include Anomaly on Bass, Joe Netzel on Drums and Dancers Rivqah Cas and Kitten Mapants
