= Kaiserslautern Synagogue =

Former synagogue in Kaiserslautern, Germany

- The synagogue in 1925

Religion
- Affiliation: Judaism
- Ecclesiastical or organisational status: Synagogue
- Status: Destroyed

Location
- Location: Present-day Synagogenplatz, Fischerstraße, Kaiserslautern, Rhineland-Palatinate
- Country: Germany
- Interactive map of Kaiserslautern Synagogue
- Coordinates: 49.444409°N 7.774479°E

Architecture
- Architect: Ludwig Levy
- Type: Synagogue
- Style: Moorish Revival with Byzantine Revival elements
- Groundbreaking: 1883
- Completed: 1886
- Destroyed: 1938
- Dome height (outer): 37 m

The Kaiserslautern Synagogue was a synagogue in Kaiserslautern, Germany, on the site now known as Synagogenplatz, beside Fischerstraße. Designed by Ludwig Levy in a style combining Moorish Revival and Byzantine Revival elements, it was inaugurated on 26 February 1886. The Nazi authorities forced the Jewish community to sell the building to the city in 1938, and it was demolished between August and October that year, before Kristallnacht.

== History ==
=== Earlier synagogue ===
Kaiserslautern's first purpose-built synagogue was erected in 1848–1849 at Salzstraße 8 and inaugurated in the early summer of 1849. It remained in use until the completion of the larger synagogue in 1886. The earlier building was then sold and converted into a house; it was demolished in 1972.

=== Construction ===
By the 1870s, the synagogue on Salzstraße had become too small for the community. In 1881, the congregation acquired a site on Frühlingsstraße, now Luisenstraße. Ludwig Levy (1854–1907), an architect based in Karlsruhe, prepared the plans for the new building.

Construction began in June 1883, and the foundation stone was laid on 29 October that year. The synagogue was inaugurated on 26 February 1886. Construction cost 193,328 marks, and the top of its central dome stood 37 metres above ground level.

== Architecture ==
The synagogue combined a domed centralised plan with a longitudinal arrangement resembling a basilica. Its ground plan consisted of a Greek cross inscribed within a square. The spaces between the arms of the cross and the surrounding square were connected to the cross arms to form side aisles, which were reserved for female members of the congregation.

Four central piers supported the arches beneath the large, bulbous dome, which rose above a drum. Pendentives bridged the spaces between the supporting arches. This structural arrangement retained elements of the Byzantine domed central-plan tradition.

Levy emphasised the central section of the façade by projecting it forward and framing a rose window and a three-part entrance with a large horseshoe arch. The arch was deeply recessed into the masonry. Numerous small windows further articulated the sections flanking the central projection.

== Demolition ==
During the Nazi period, Kaiserslautern was intended to become a regional party capital, or Gauhauptstadt. Fischerstraße, then named Dr.-Frick-Straße after Wilhelm Frick, was designated as a route for party parades. Mayor Richard Imbt used plans to widen the street as a pretext for removing the synagogue, claiming that it had never fitted into the cityscape and obstructed the proposed improvements.

The Jewish community was forced to sell the synagogue to the city. A farewell service was held on 27 August 1938, and demolition began on 31 August. Several explosions were required to destroy the building, with the final blast taking place on 9 October 1938.

== Memorial ==
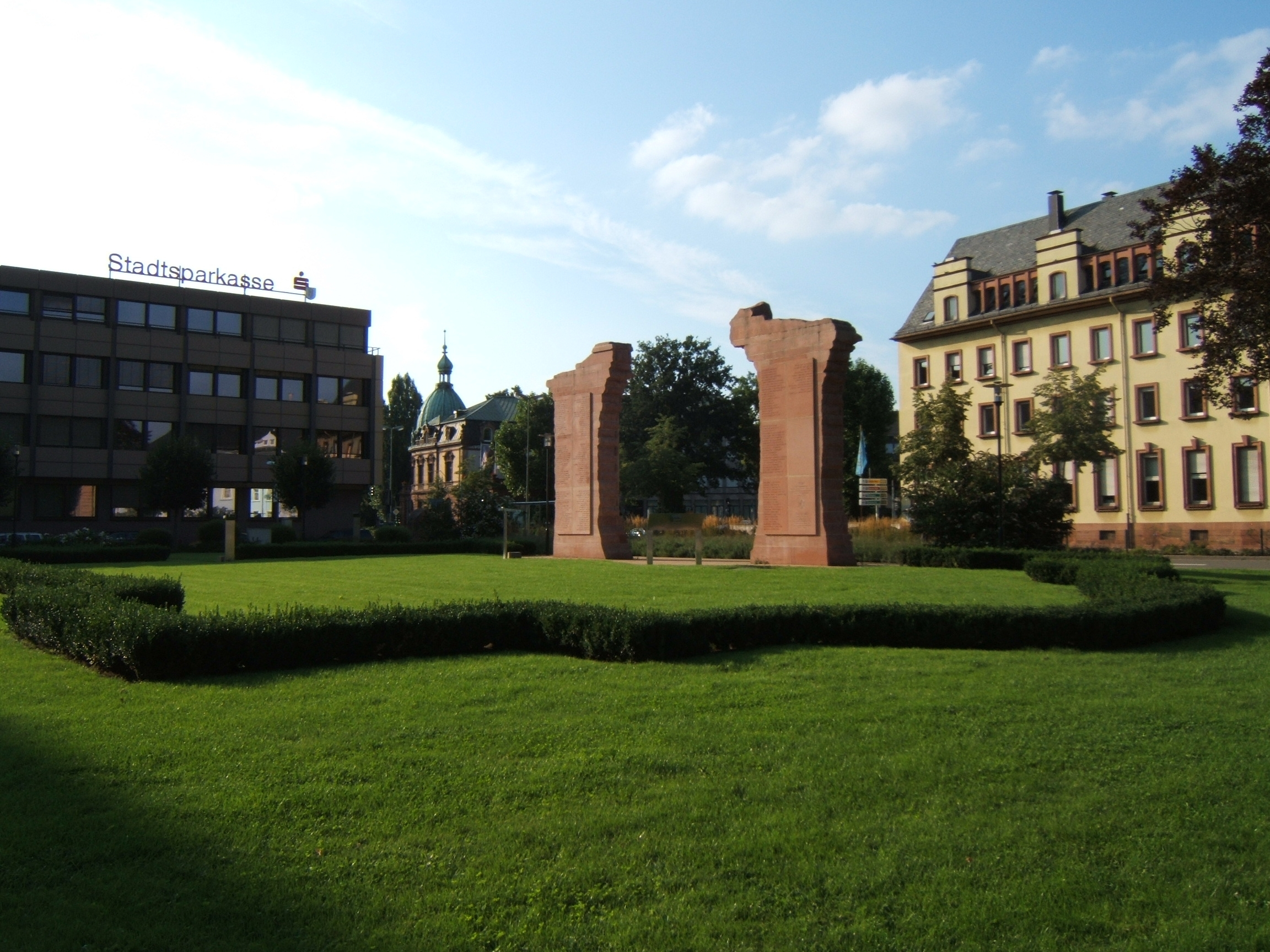
The memorial at Synagogenplatz

A memorial stone was erected on the former synagogue site in 1980. The site covers approximately 2,440 square metres (26,300 sq ft).

In 2002, the square was redesigned to commemorate the Jewish victims of Nazi persecution in Kaiserslautern. Box hedges mark the outline of the former synagogue's exterior walls. Two sandstone fragments reproduce part of the structure that remained standing for several days during its demolition. The names of victims are inscribed on their inner faces.

Seven viewing devices show images from a virtual reconstruction of the synagogue produced by the Technical University of Darmstadt, each depicting the building from the viewer's position on the square.

== Gallery ==
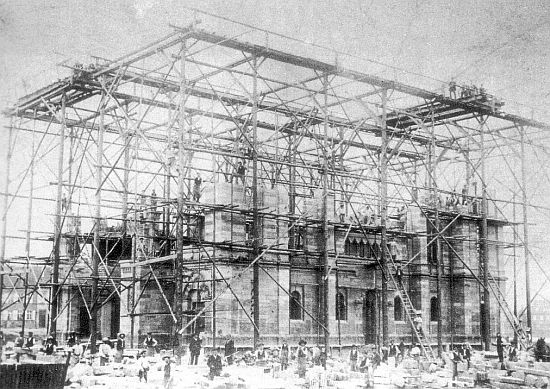
The synagogue under construction in 1884

The synagogue in 1900

The synagogue in 1909

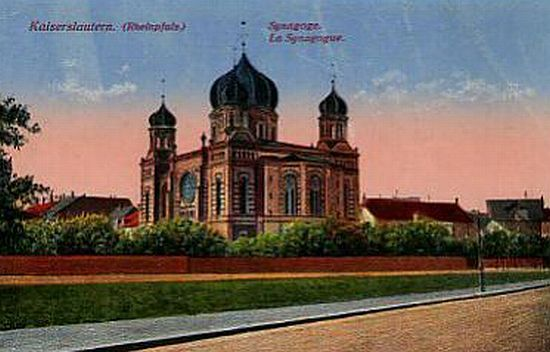
An early 20th-century postcard

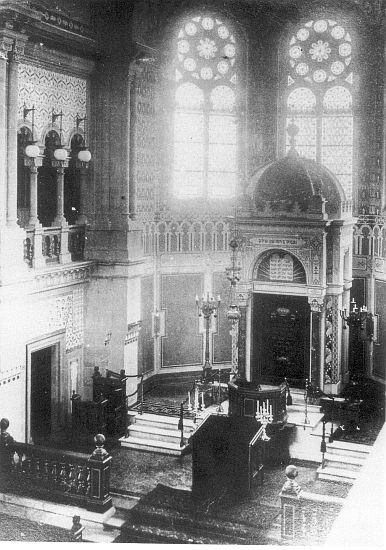
Interior view

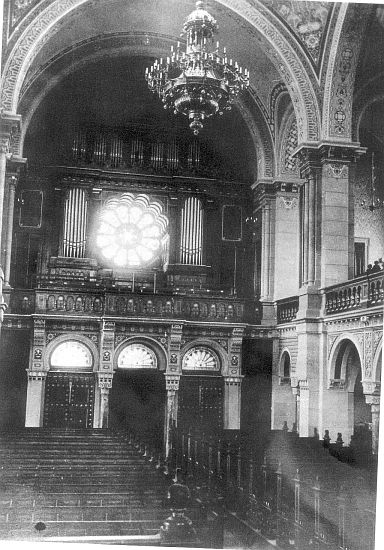
Another view of the interior
