= Margot Römer =

Venezuelan artist (1938-2005)

Margot Römer (1938, Caracas, Venezuela – 2005) was a Venezuelan artist who was a leader of radical experimental art, a teacher and a professional pilot. Her artwork reflected topics involving domesticity and sensuality of the human body. She emphasized topics of the female body by using objects to create irony. Römer had diverse knowledge in many mediums including silkscreen, pencil, oil painting, and sometimes assemblages or collages involving found objects.

== Biography ==
Born October 7, 1938, in Caracas, Venezuela, and died in 2005. Römer used conceptual language and objects in her work to refer to the human body. In 1976, Römer became part of a curatorial team for the Galeria de Arte Nacional in Caracas. She was a director of Sala Mendoza art foundation. In the 1970s, Römer focused on incorporating messages about violence and corruption awareness within her art. During the late 1980s, she turned her focus on environmental and social issues. She was an educator and art historian who wrote about Venezuelan art and the culmination of installation art and conceptual art. Römer participated in group exhibitions and events, including 1973 XII São Paulo Biennial and the 1981 São Paulo Biennial.

Römer's earliest teachers were Armando Lira and Lucio Rivas, where she learned the importance of color. Later studied under Cristóbal Rojas at the school of Plastic and Applied Arts from 1969 to 1971. It was in 1973 that she entered an Engraving workshop of Luisa Palacios in which Römer learned about pop art concepts and figuration. In 1974, she began using discarded objects and painting them vibrant colors to give them a sense of alternate meaning. Margot Römer is most known for her urinal and nationality works in which she paints them in multicolor, often colors of the Venezuelan flag and gives them a smooth organic appearance.

In 1978, she began her work on flags and nationality at "The International Drawing Triennial" in Poland. She began teaching at the Salon d'Automne in Paris in the Metropolitan University until 1982. Römer left for the United States in 1982, and exhibited artwork in "Artists from the Continent" in Virginia. She volunteered at Museum of Modern Art in New York in the cataloging and graphic work for the department in prints and illustrated books. She returned to Venezuela in 1984, where she started artworks featuring mountains covered in national flags.

== Art works ==
Aparato reproductor de la mujer (Woman's reproductive system) Made in 1972 with acrylic paint over a wooden door and cactus in a flower pot placed within the window of the door. On the door there is a list with the female reproductive system. This was exhibited in both Henrique Faria, New York and the Brooklyn Museum.

"The Urinal of Marcel Duchamp" A painting Römer presented in the Associated Graphic Arts Workshop of Luisa Palacios (TAGA). The painting is of a urinal inside a see-through box wrapped in a bow like a gift. The idea behind this piece was to take an everyday object and give it new meaning. In recognition of the iconography of the artist Marcel Duchamp. The urinal is painted with black and white stripes externally. While the inside is a mixture of blue, red and magenta. This painting comes from Dadaist influences because of the emphasis on the unpredictable and absurd importance of wasted objects.

Corte esquemático del abdomen (Schematic cut of the abdomen)1970 This artwork was shown in Henrique Faria, New York. The medium for this piece is silkscreen. The image shows an oven with a dominant red color similar to that of an abdomen. The oven is left with its door open and has a pink frame for the opening. This is a representation of woman's bodies, their abdomen is looked at as machines that can produce babies.

== Exhibitions ==
=== Solo exhibitions ===
- Desde el taller de Margot Römer (1976) Estudio Actual, Caracas
- La estrella es la estrella (1987) Museo de Bellas Artes, Caracas
- Del cielo a la tierra (1991) Sala Mendoza, Caracas
- Balance general (1996) Museo de Arte Contemporáneo de Caracas Sofía Imber
- Ortogonías (2001) Museo Alejandro Otero, Caracas. This series shows a representation of 3-dimensional objects through a linear perspective.
- Las sensaciones perdidas del hombre (1972) Sala Mendoza, Caracas
- Para contribuir a la confusión general (1972) Ateneo de Caracas
- Dibujos (1973) Sala Mendoza, Caracas
- Piel y piel (1973) XII Bienal de São Paulo
- Las artes plásticas en Venezuela (1976) Museo de Bellas Artes, Caracas
- Third International Drawing Biennial (1976) Inglaterra
- The International Drawing Trienal (1978) Wroclaw, Poland
- Artists from the Continent (1983) Chrysler Museum, Norkfolk, Virginia, USA
- Challenge: Young Latin America on Paper (1987) CDS Gallery, NY
- Bienal de Cuenca, Ecuador (1989; mención honorífica)
- Fabulación-Figuración. 75 años de pintura latinoamericana (1990) Galería de Arte National, Caracas
- Transitoria (2003) Centro Cultural Corp Group, Caracas.

=== Group exhibitions ===
In 1972, Römer participated in "two seminal group exhibitions in the history of conceptional art in Caracas. Las Sensaciones Perdidas del Hombre at Sala Mendoza, and Para Contribuir a la Confusión General in Ateneo de Caracas. In 1973, she made Skin to Skin for the XII Biennial of São Paulo. This was a pentagonal model referring to the sensations perceived through the skin.

== Honors and awards ==
1972: Received honorable mention at the 2nd Salón Nacional de Jóvenes Artistas de Maracay for her work entitled, El aparato reproductor de la mujer (woman's reproductive system).

1977: Römer received the Premio Arturo Michelena as the first female artist from Venezuela.

2000: She won the Premio Nacional Armando Reverón for visual arts.

== Publications ==
In 2003, Römer wrote La transestética postmoderna in Caracas. This book addresses Venezuelan art and the postmodernism that exists in the world. Particularly the chronological progression and overview of events within the art world. Based on Römer's graduate thesis when she studied at the Universidad Simón Rodríguez in Caracas.

== Bibliography ==
Fajardo-Hill, Cecilia (2017). Radical Women: Latin American Art, 1960 -1985. Armand Hammer Museum of Art and Cultural Center; Brooklyn Museum: Hammer Museum, University of California; Munich; New York: Del Monico Books/Prestel, 2017. ISBN 9783791356808.

Guevara, Roberto. Margot Römer: Balance general. Caraca: Museo de Arte Contemporáneo de Caracas Sofía Imber, 1996.

Jiménez, Ariel. Margot Römer: Del cielo a la tierra. Caracas: Sala Mendoza, 1991.

La Rocca, Graziana. Margot Römer: Series lenguajes plásticos; Artistas de hoy y mañana. Vol. 2. Caracas: Colegial Bolivariana, 2001.

Rojas, Fernando. Colección arte venezolano: Margot Römer. Caracas: Ministerio del Poder Popular para la Cultura, 2008.

Römer, Margot. La transestética postmoderna. Caracas: Fundación Banco Mercantil, 2003.

Post-War & Contemporary Art, RAGO ARTS AND AUCTION CENTER. https://www.ragoarts.com/docs/pdf_catalogues/2018_MayPWart.pdf

Benezit Dictionary of Artists. Oxford University Press. 2010. ISBN 978-0199773787.
