= Margot Wikström =

Swedish politician (1936–2010)

Margot Wikström (1936 – 4 September 2010) was a Swedish politician of the Social Democratic Party.

In the 1970s she was elected to the city council of Umeå, and in 1980 she became mayor, the first woman mayor in the county. From 1990 to 2001 she was a member of the leadership of the Social Democratic party.

From 1995 to 1999, Wikström was the president of the Swedish Association of Local Authorities (Svenska Kommunförbundet), an association that existed from 1969 to 2007 (now part of the Swedish Association of Regions) to interact with the Riksdag of Sweden.

Preceded by Joakim Ollén	President of the Swedish Association of Local Authorities; 1995–1999	Succeeded by Ilmar Reepalu
