= 22, Rue du Général de Castelnau =

Art Nouveau house in Strasbourg, France

Immeuble, 22 rue du Général de Castelnau
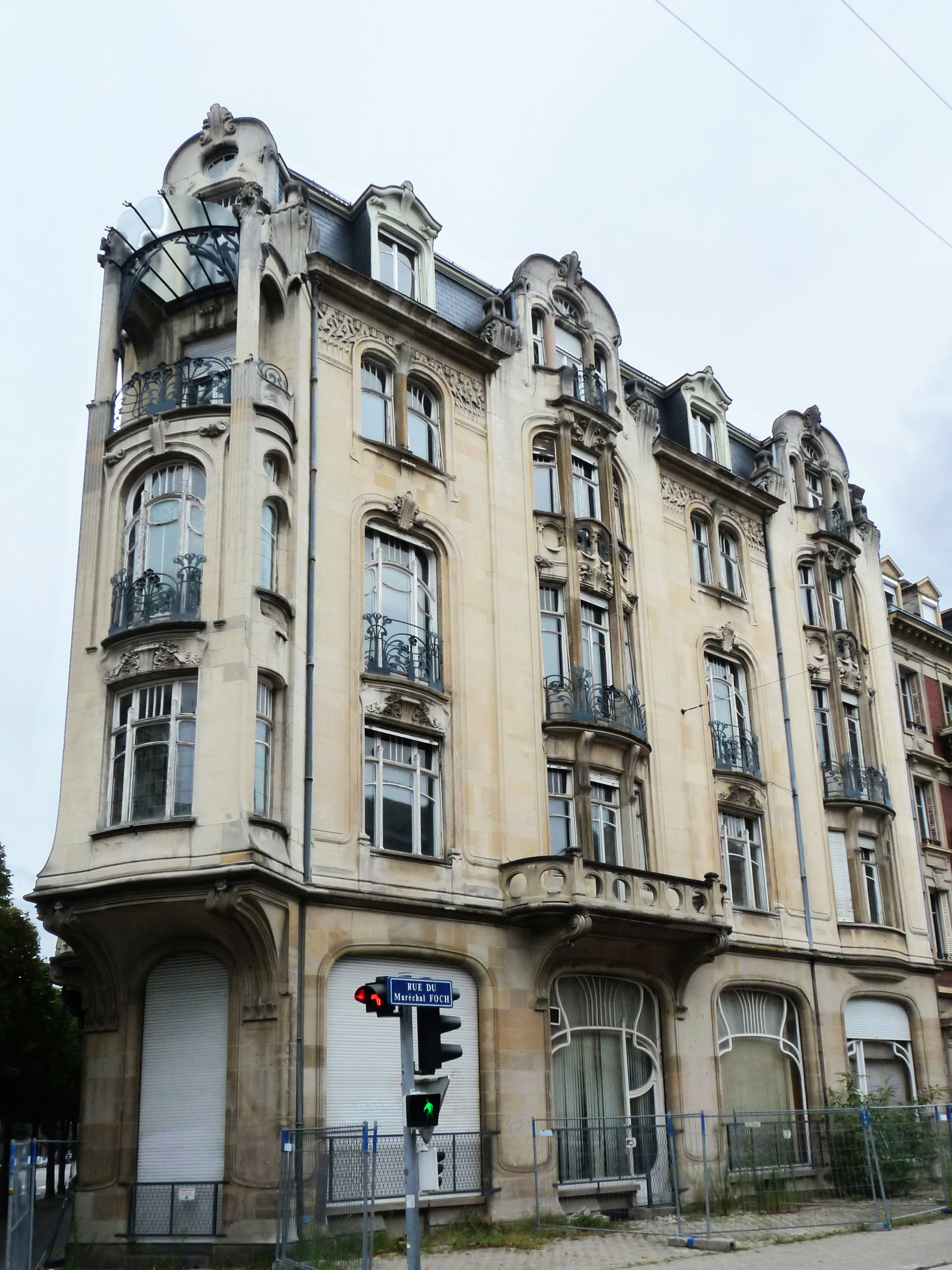

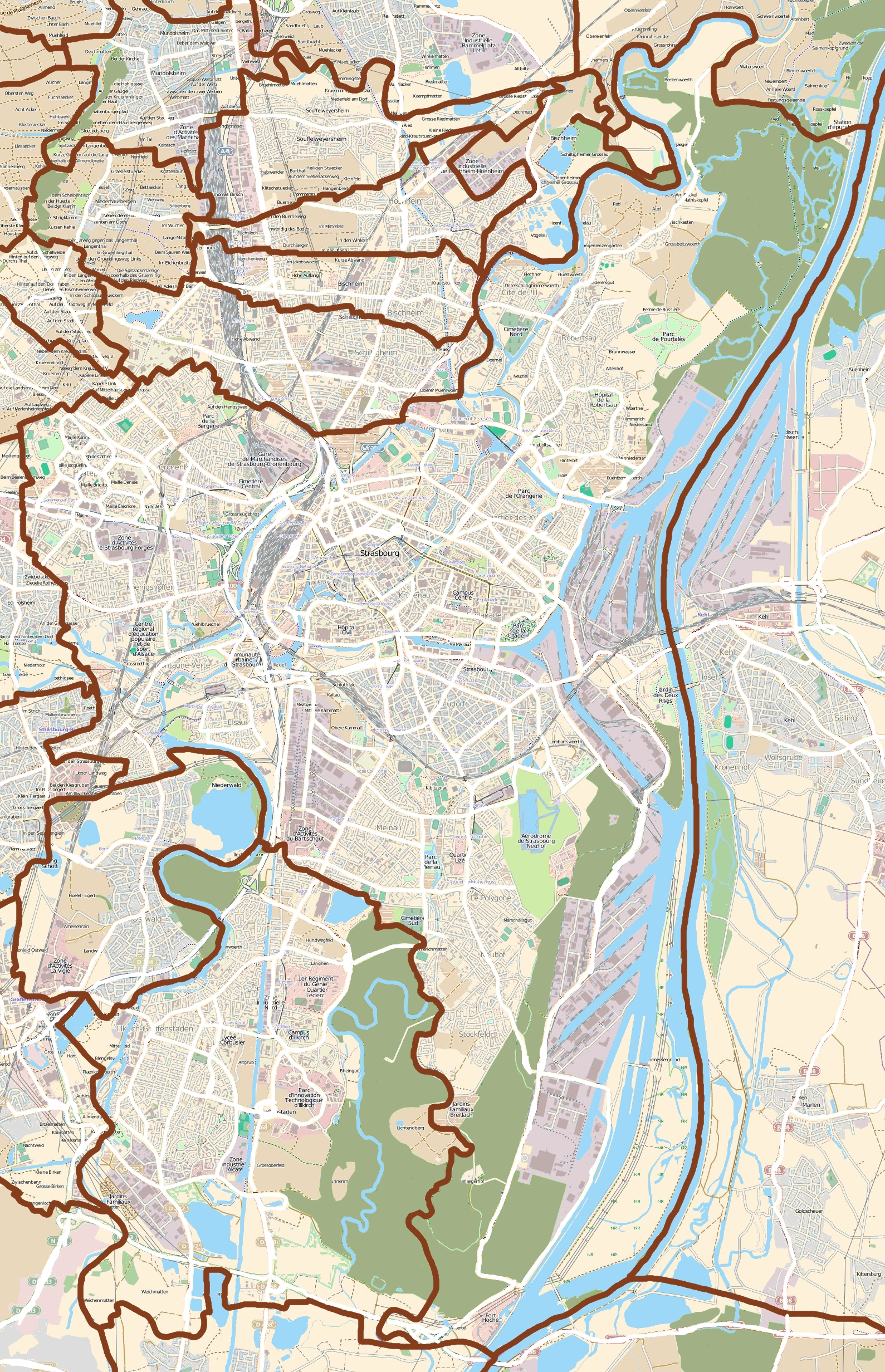
- Location within Strasbourg

General information
- Type: House
- Architectural style: Art Nouveau
- Location: Strasbourg, France
- Coordinates: 48°35′20.50″N 7°45′04″E
- Construction started: 1901
- Completed: 23 June 1903
- Renovated: 1948–1949

Technical details
- Floor count: 4

Design and construction
- Architects: Franz Lütke, Heinrich Backes

The House on 22, Rue du Général de Castelnau is an Art Nouveau building in the Neustadt district of Strasbourg, France. It is classified as a Monument historique by the French Ministry of Culture since 1975. Located at the angle of Rue du Général de Castelnau and Rue du Maréchal Foch, it has a triangular plan and two facades.

The house was built from 1901 until 1903 by the architects Franz Lütke (1860–1929) and Heinrich Backes (1866–1931), who used one of the floors as their office, they were professional partners from 1898 until 1907. A very prolific duo, they built a number of other Art Nouveau houses in Strasbourg, of which several are classified as Monuments historiques as well (such as 46, Avenue des Vosges; 56, Allée de la Robertsau; 4, Rue Erckmann-Chatrian; and 24, Rue Twinger).

In spite of the use of reinforced concrete, the house is described as "lithe and light" (souple et léger). It has been called "probably the finest Art Nouveau apartment building in the city".

== Gallery ==
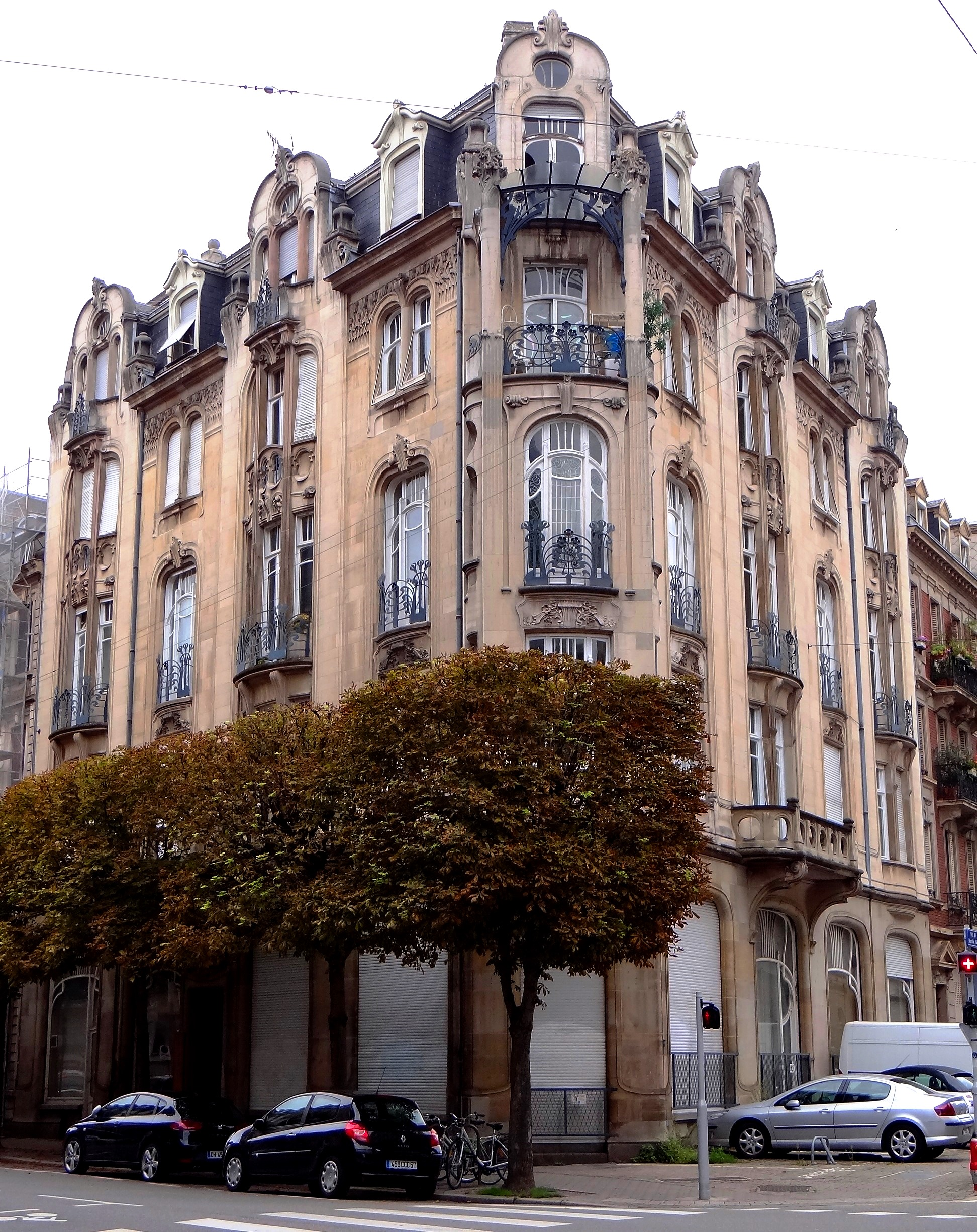
The house

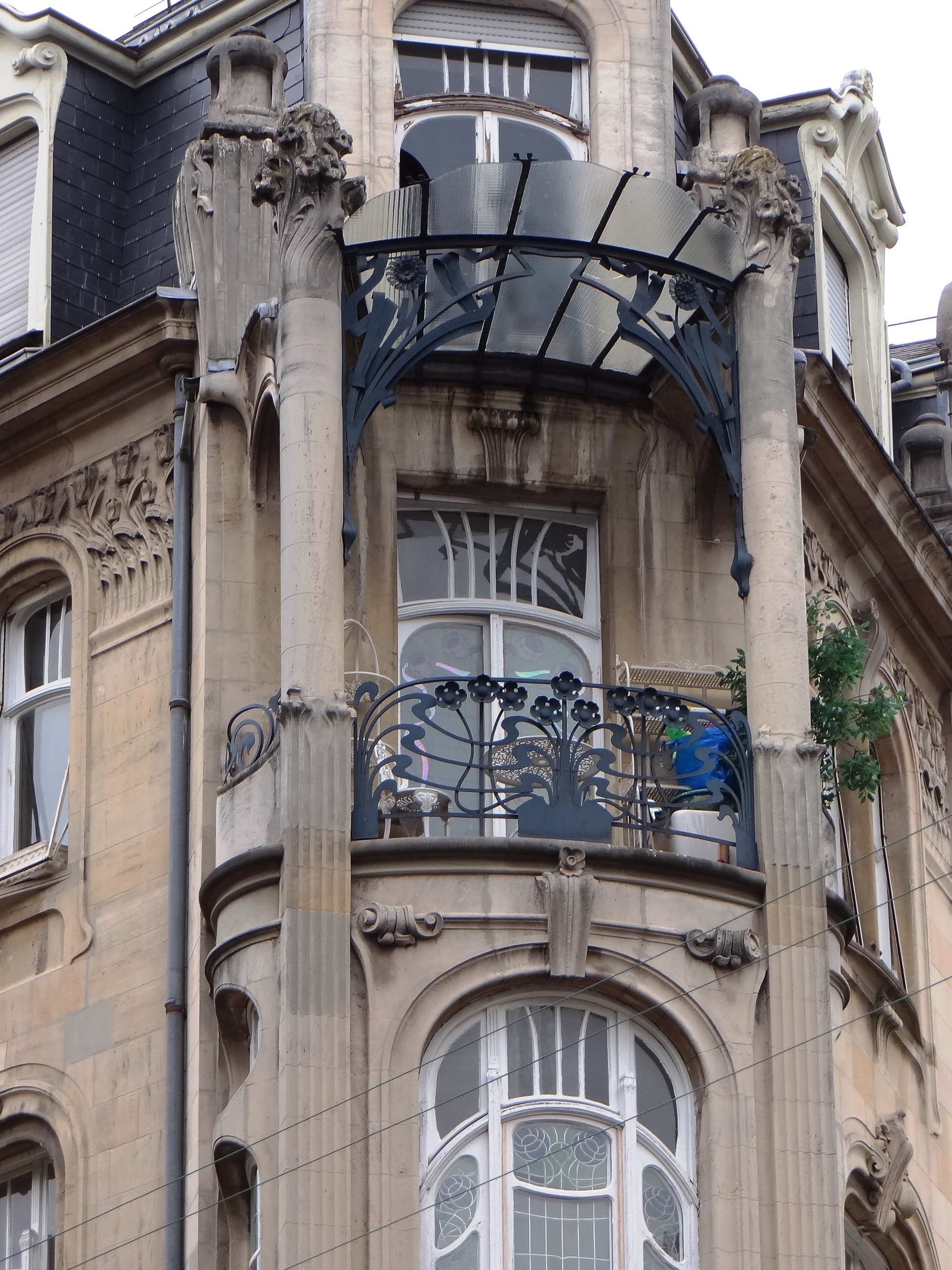
Detail of a balcony

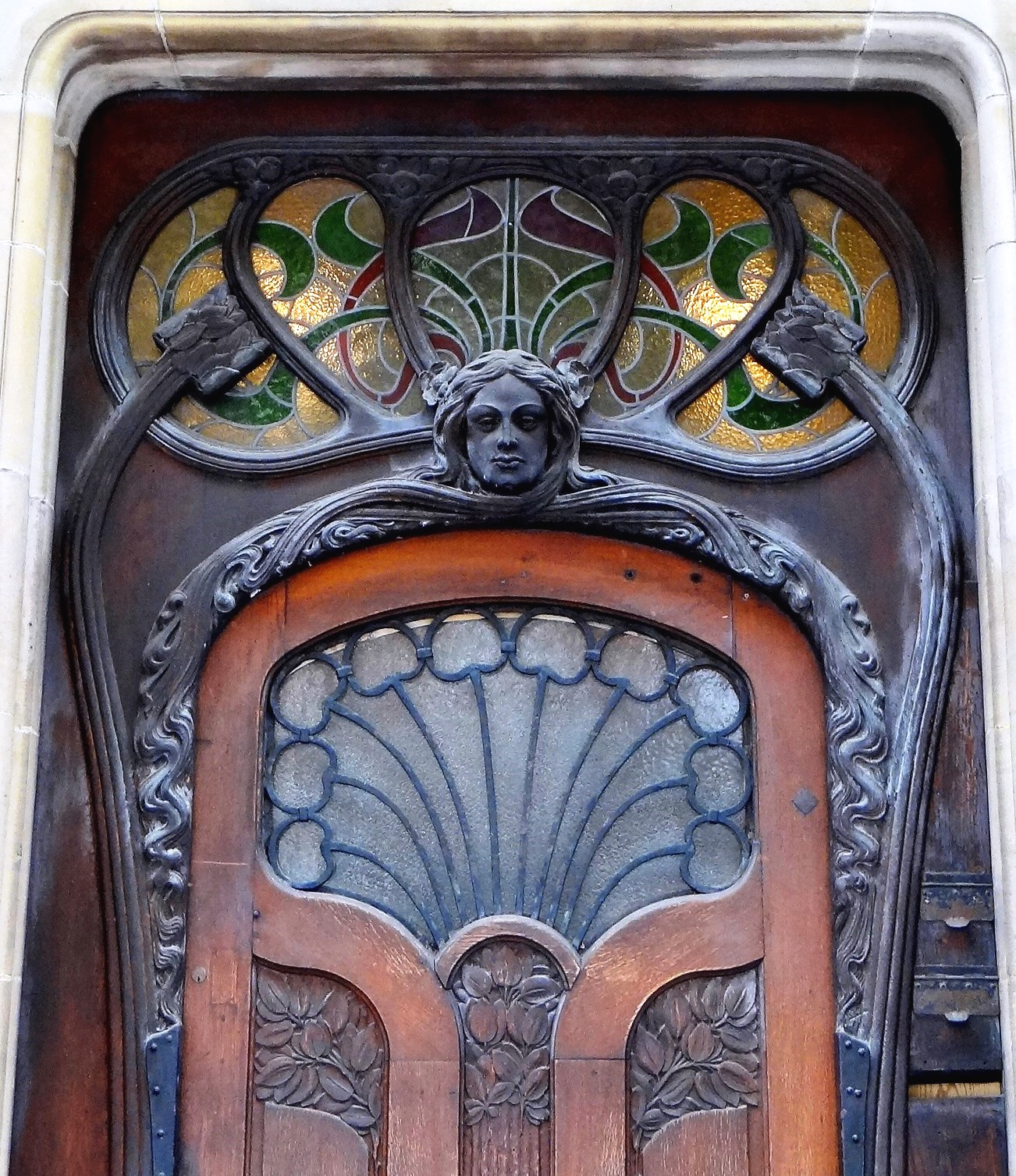
Detail of the door

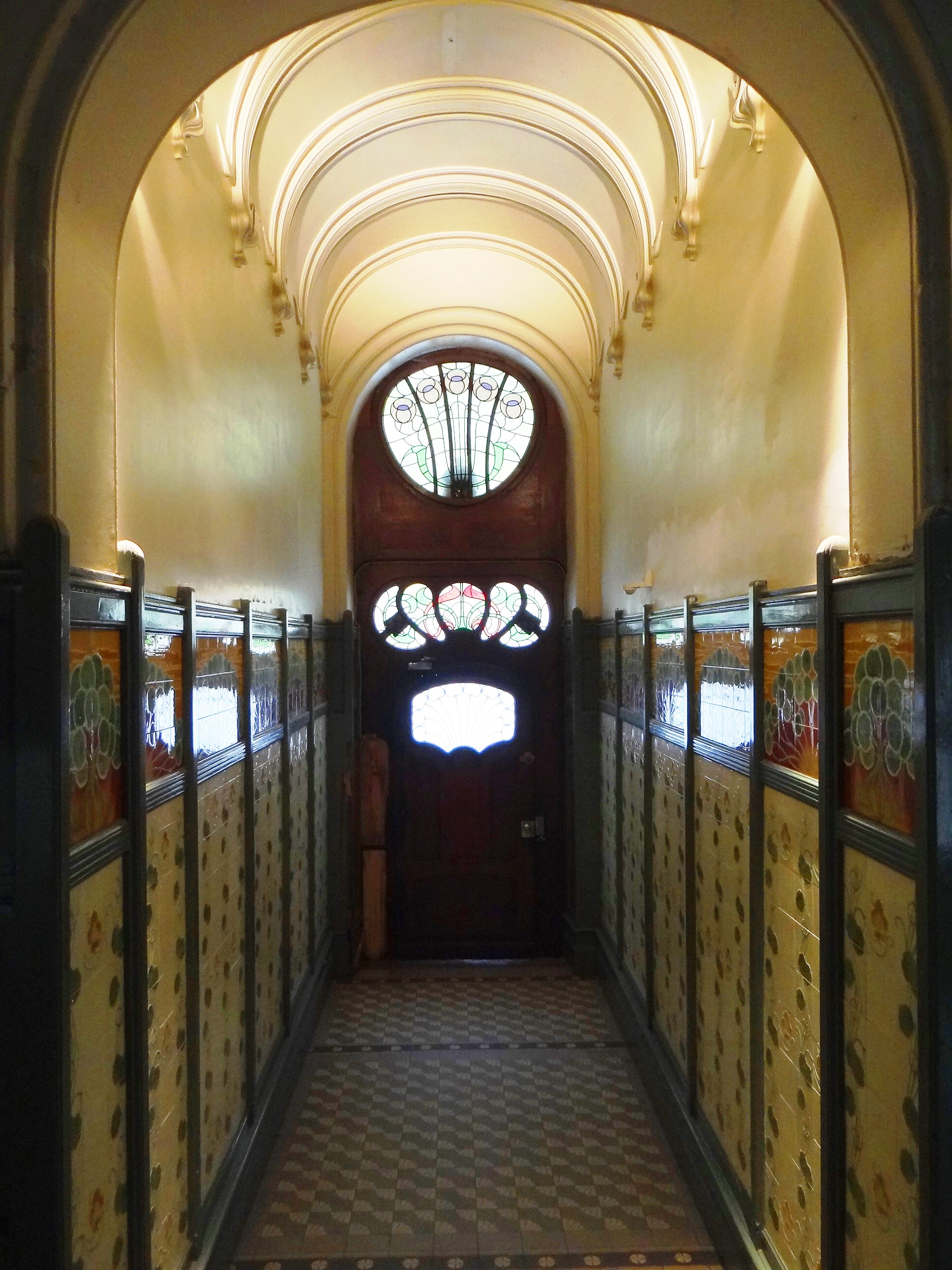
The entrance

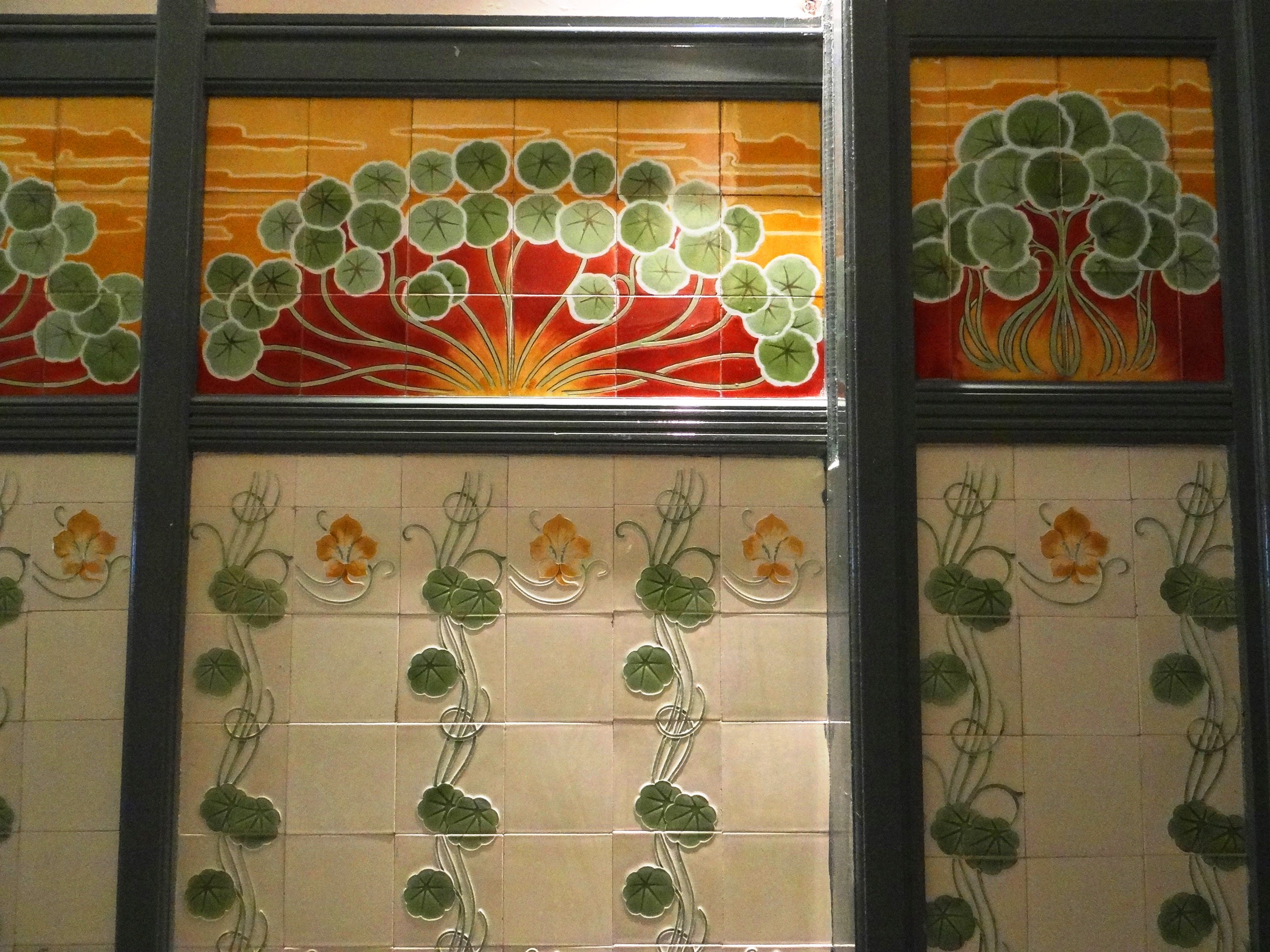
Glazed tiles in the entrance

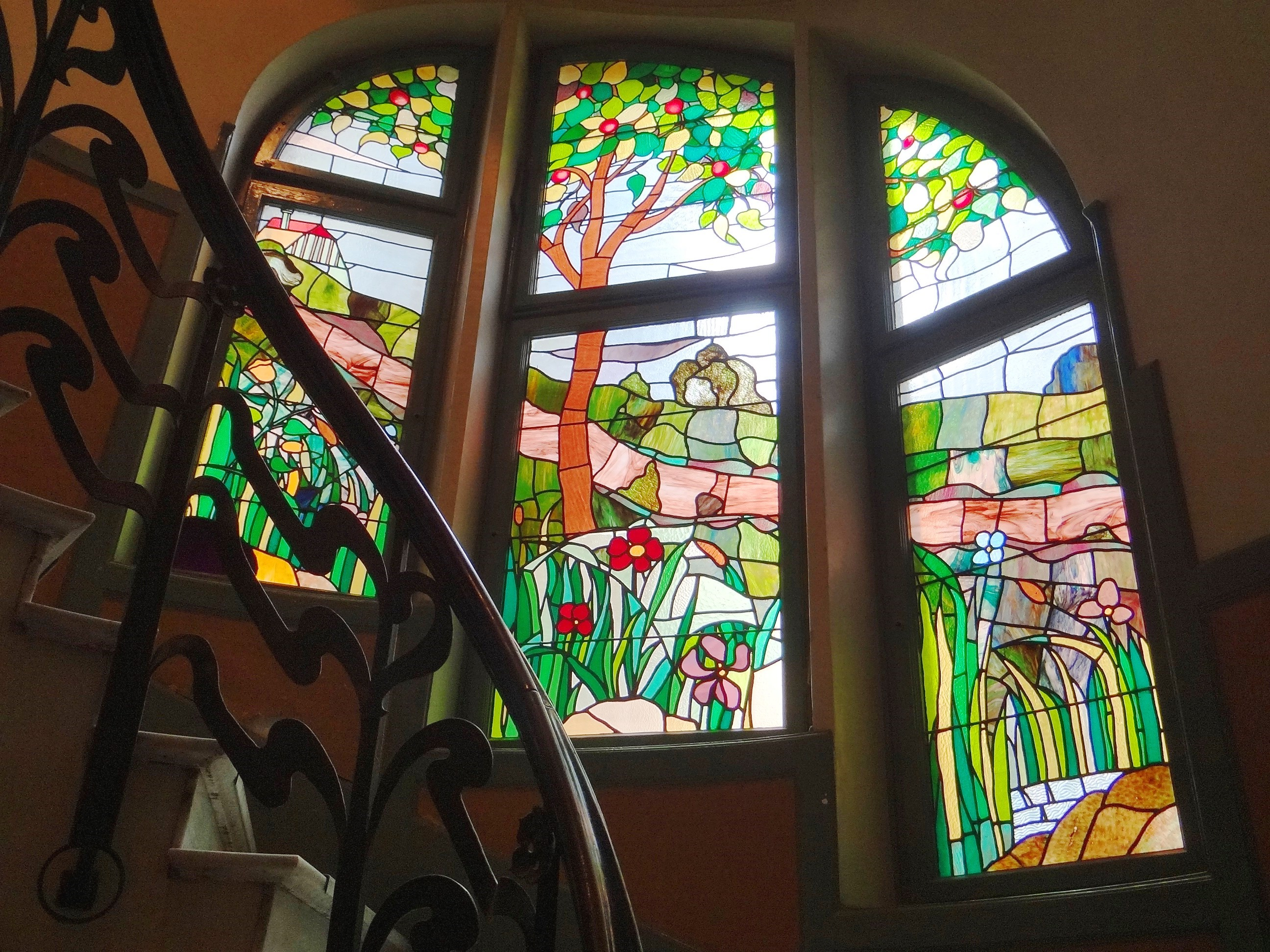
Stained glass in the staircase
