= 56, Allée de la Robertsau =

Historic building in Strasbourg, France

Immeuble, 56 allée de la Robertsau
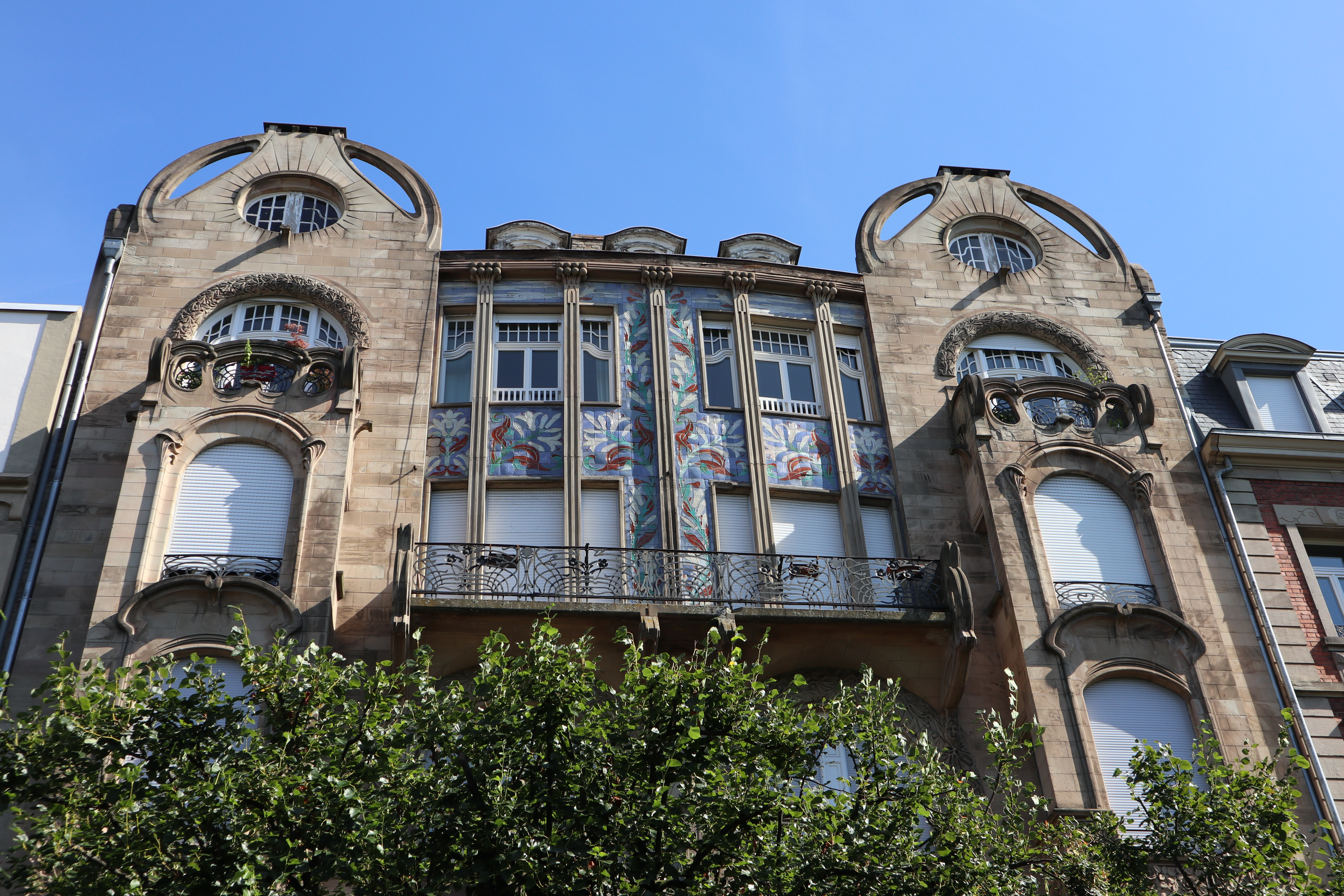
- Upper part with mosaic

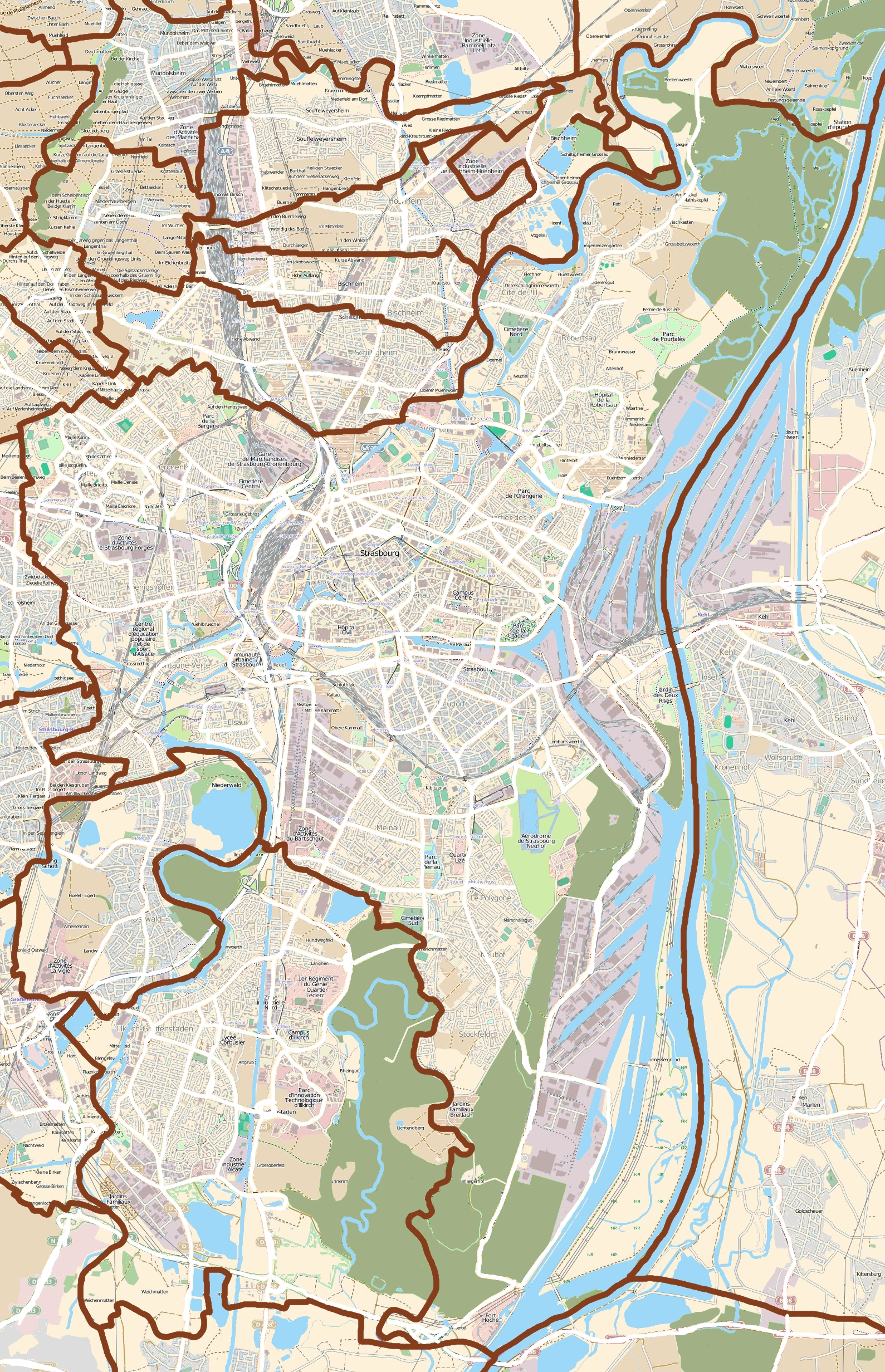
- Location within Strasbourg

General information
- Type: House
- Architectural style: Art Nouveau
- Location: Strasbourg, France
- Coordinates: 48°35′25″N 7°46′06″E
- Construction started: 7 April 1902
- Completed: 14 April 1903

Technical details
- Floor count: 4

Design and construction
- Architects: Franz Lütke, Heinrich Backes

The House on 56, Allée de la Robertsau is an Art Nouveau building in the Neustadt district of Strasbourg, France. It is classified as a Monument historique by the French Ministry of Culture since 1975.

The house was built from 1902 until 1903 by the architects Franz Lütke (1860–1929) and Heinrich Backes (1866–1931) for the master baker Georges Cromer. It is considered one of the most representative buildings of the Strasbourg brand of Art Nouveau architecture, influenced both by German and by French stylistic tendencies.

Lütke and Backes were professional partners from 1898 until 1907. A very prolific duo, they built a number of other Art Nouveau houses in Strasbourg, of which several are classified as Monuments historiques as well (such as 46, Avenue des Vosges; 22, Rue du Général de Castelnau; 4, Rue Erckmann-Chatrian; and 24, Rue Twinger).

== Gallery ==
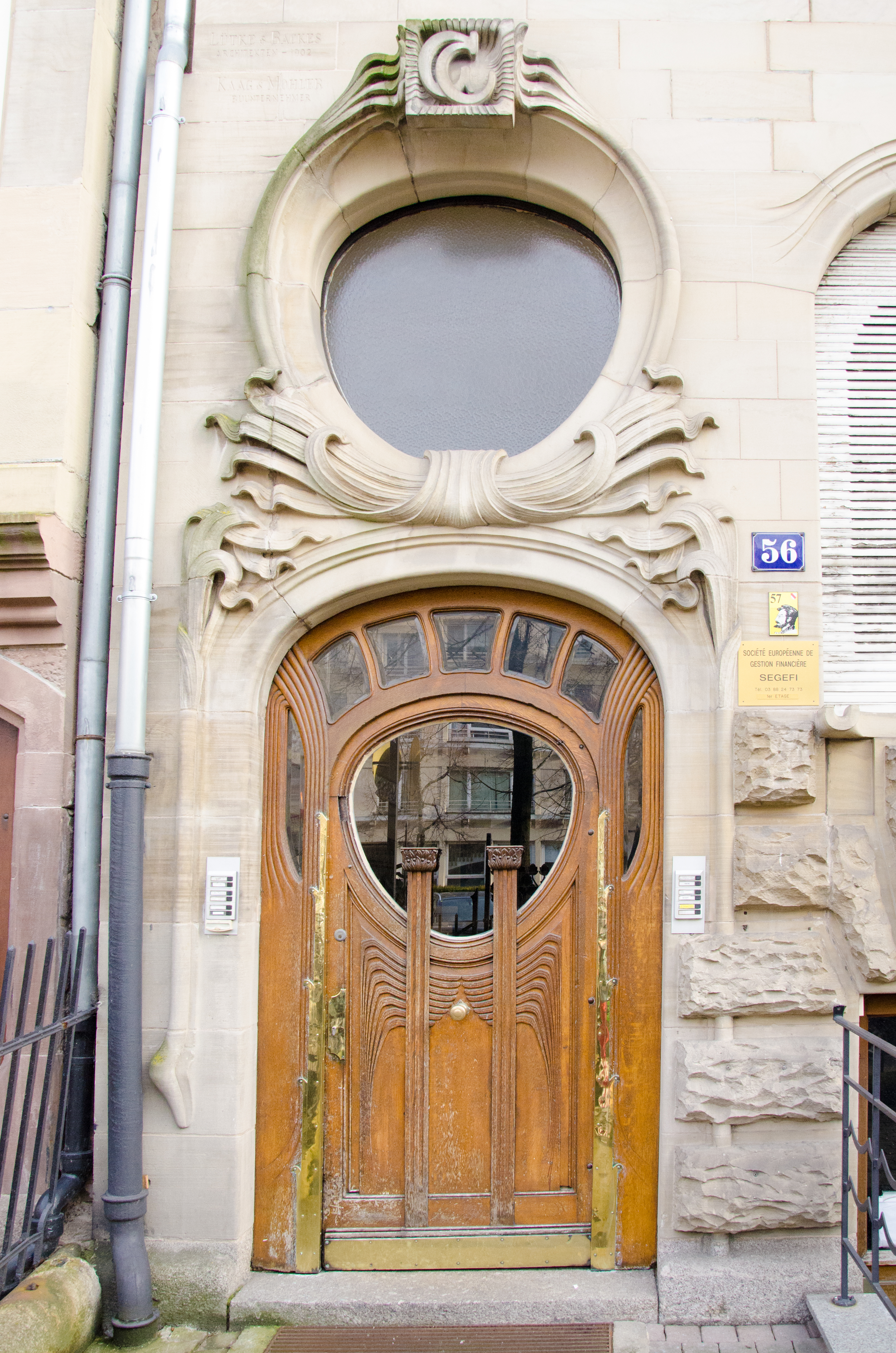
Entrance

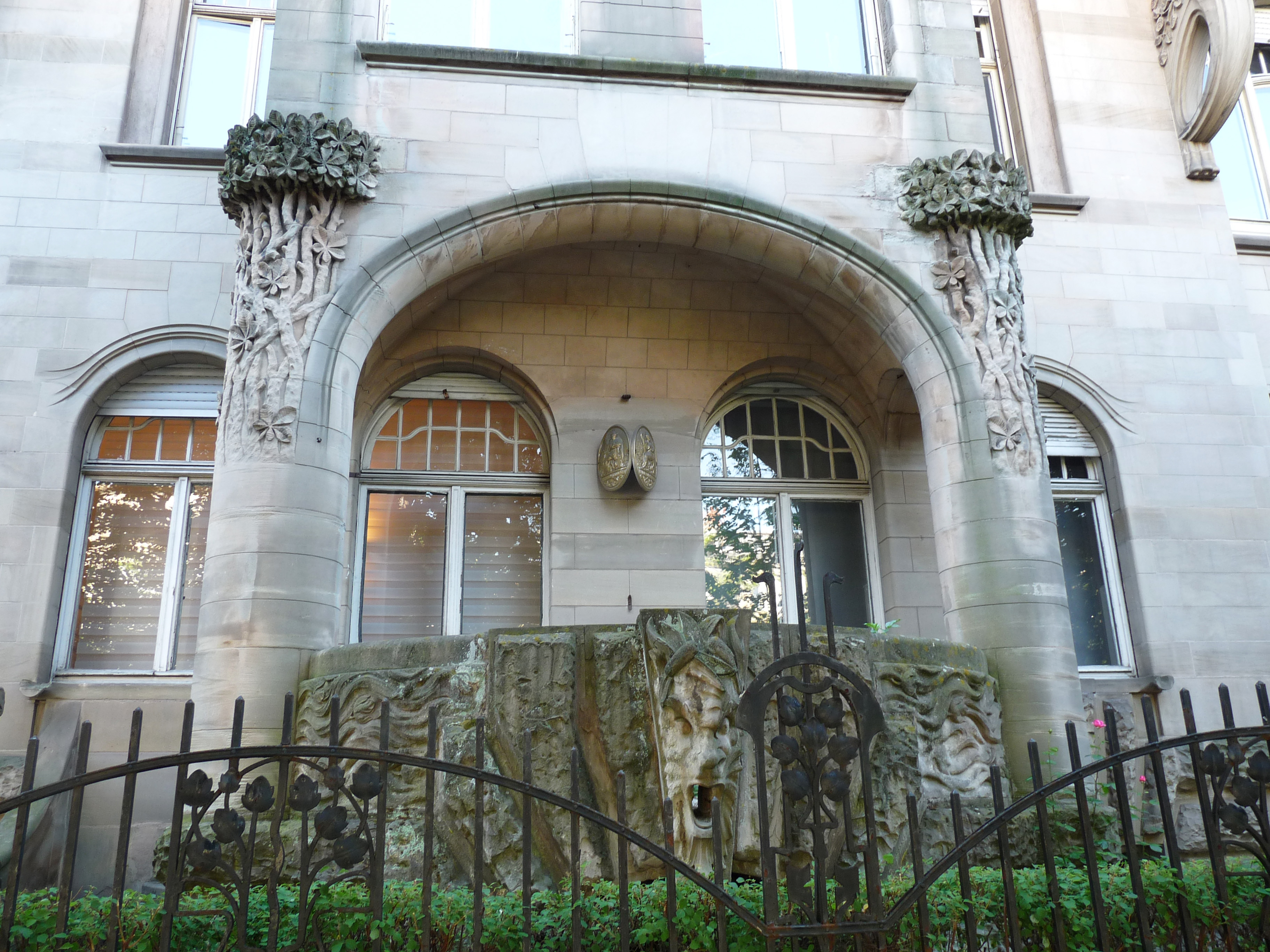
Lower part (garden terrace)

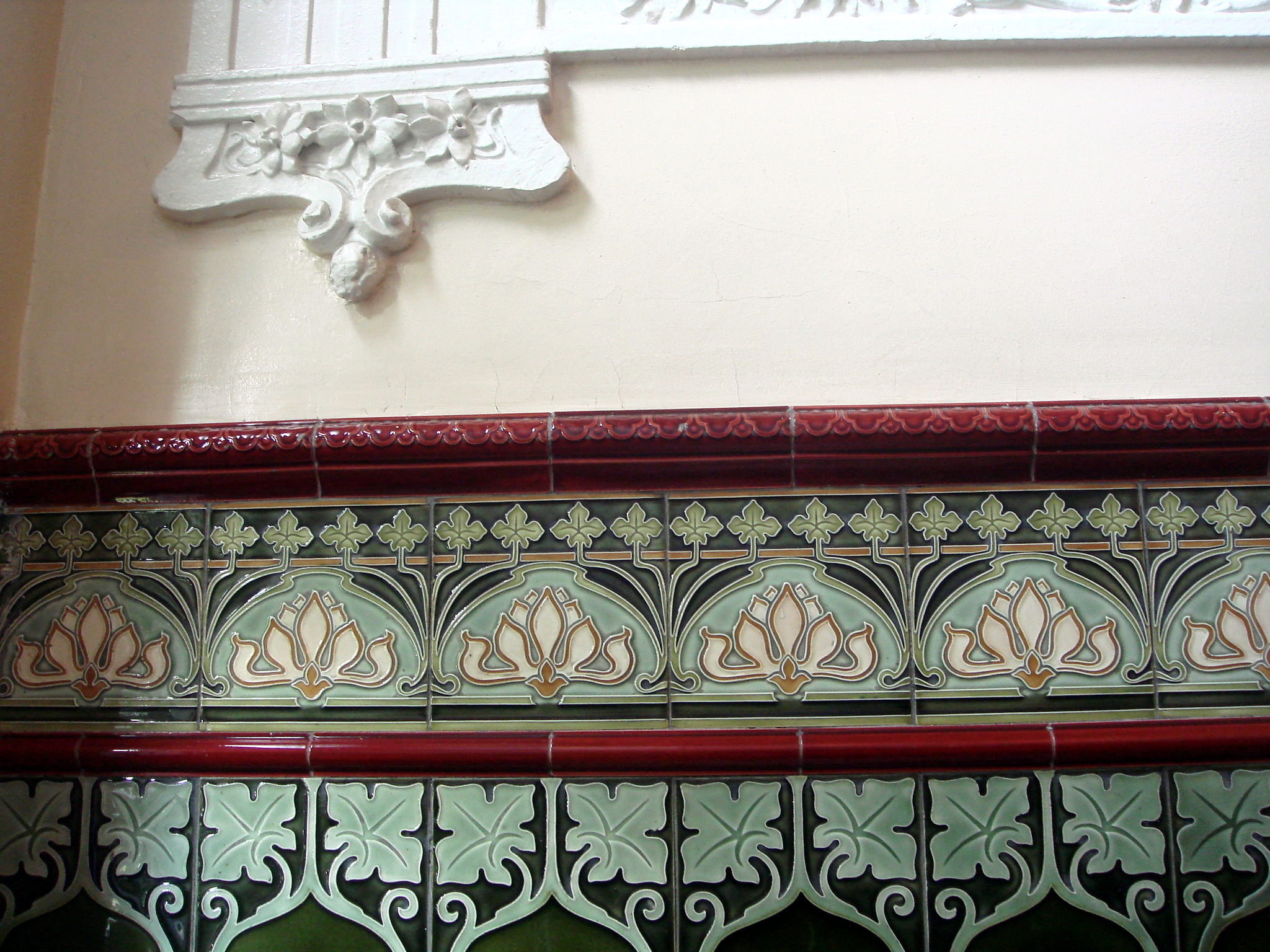
Glazed tiles in the entrance

== See also ==
- Villa Schutzenberger, in the same street
