= Grande Île, Strasbourg =

Island in Strasbourg, France

UNESCO World Heritage Site
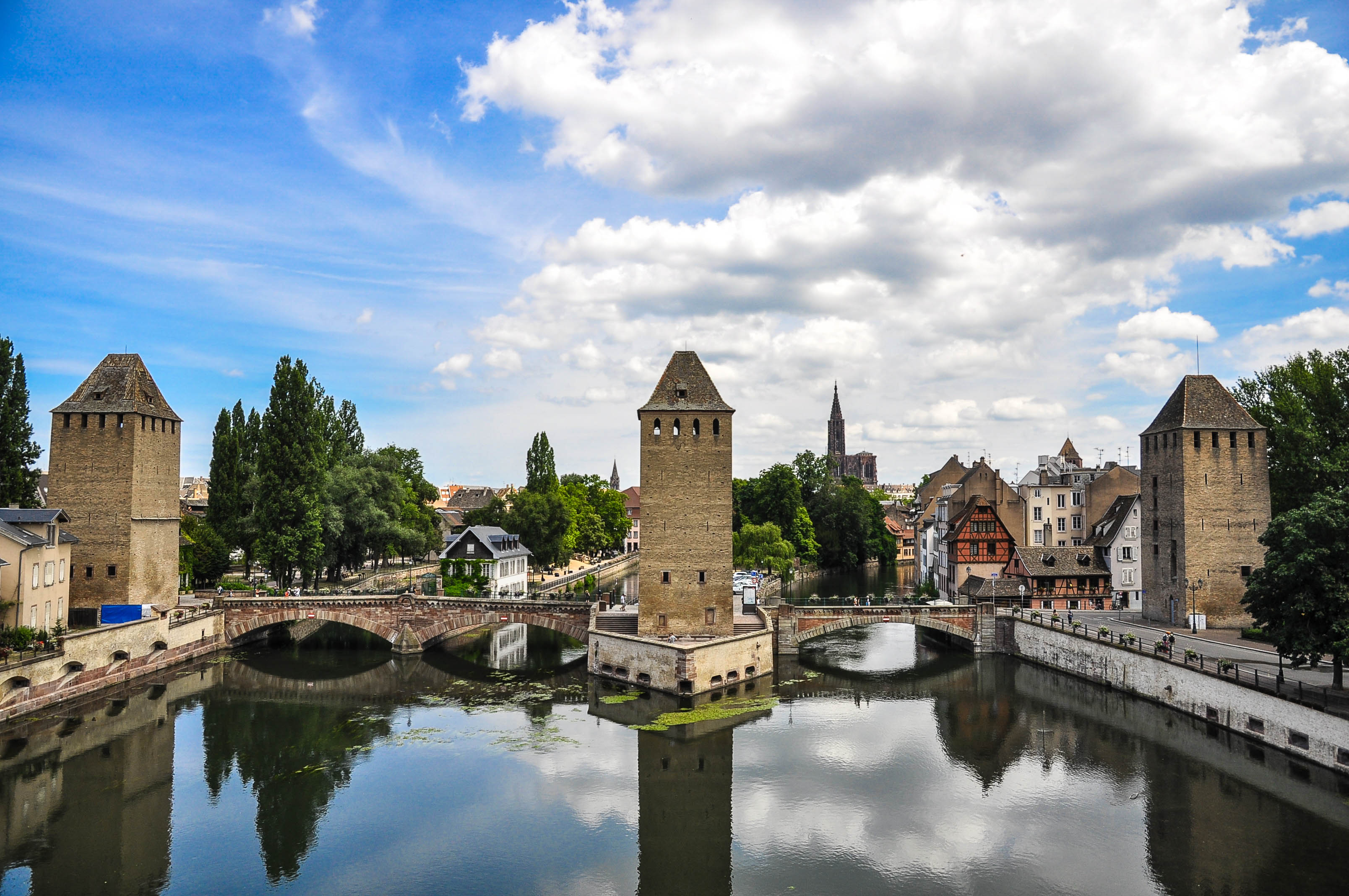
- View of part of the Ponts Couverts, to the west of the Grande Île, from the Barrage Vauban

- Location within Grand Est Location within France
- Location: Strasbourg, Bas-Rhin, Grand Est, France
- Part of: Strasbourg, Grande-Île and Neustadt
- Criteria: Cultural: (i), (ii), (iv)
- Reference: 495bis
- Inscription: 1988 (12th Session)
- Extensions: 2017
- Coordinates: 48°34′58.8″N 7°44′52.8″E

The Grande Île (French pronunciation: [ɡʁɑ̃d il]; "Large Island") is an island that lies at the historic centre of Strasbourg, France. Its name derives from the fact that it is surrounded on one side by the main channel of the Ill river and on the other side by the Canal du Faux-Rempart, a canalised arm of that river. The Grande Île was named a UNESCO World Heritage Site in 1988. At the time, the International Council on Monuments and Sites noted that the Grande Île is "an old quarter that exemplifies medieval cities".

The Grande Île is sometimes referred to as "ellipse insulaire" because of its shape. It measures some 1.25 kilometres (0.78 mi) by 0.75 kilometres (0.47 mi) at its longest and broadest. At the centre of the island lies the Place Kléber, the city's central square. Further south is Strasbourg Cathedral, the world's fourth-tallest church and an ornate example of 15th-century Gothic architecture. At the western end of the island is the quarter of Petite France, the former home of the city's tanners, millers and fishermen, and now one of Strasbourg's main tourist attractions. The Grande Île also houses the former fluvial customs house Ancienne Douane.

Besides the cathedral, the Grande Île is home to four other centuries-old churches: St. Thomas, St. Pierre-le-Vieux, St. Pierre-le-Jeune, and St. Étienne. Being the historical center of Strasbourg and the seat of local secular power, it also houses the city's most imposing 18th-century hôtels particuliers and palaces, including the Palais Rohan, the Hôtel de Hanau (now the City Hall), the Hôtel des Deux-Ponts (birthplace of Ludwig I of Bavaria and now home to the city's military governor), the Hôtel de Klinglin, the Hôtel d'Andlau-Klinglin, and the Hôtel de Neuwiller, among many others. The island is also home to the Episcopal Palace of the Archdiocese of Strasbourg.

To mark the Grande Île's status as a World Heritage Site, 22 brass plates were placed on the bridges giving access to the island.

== Gallery ==
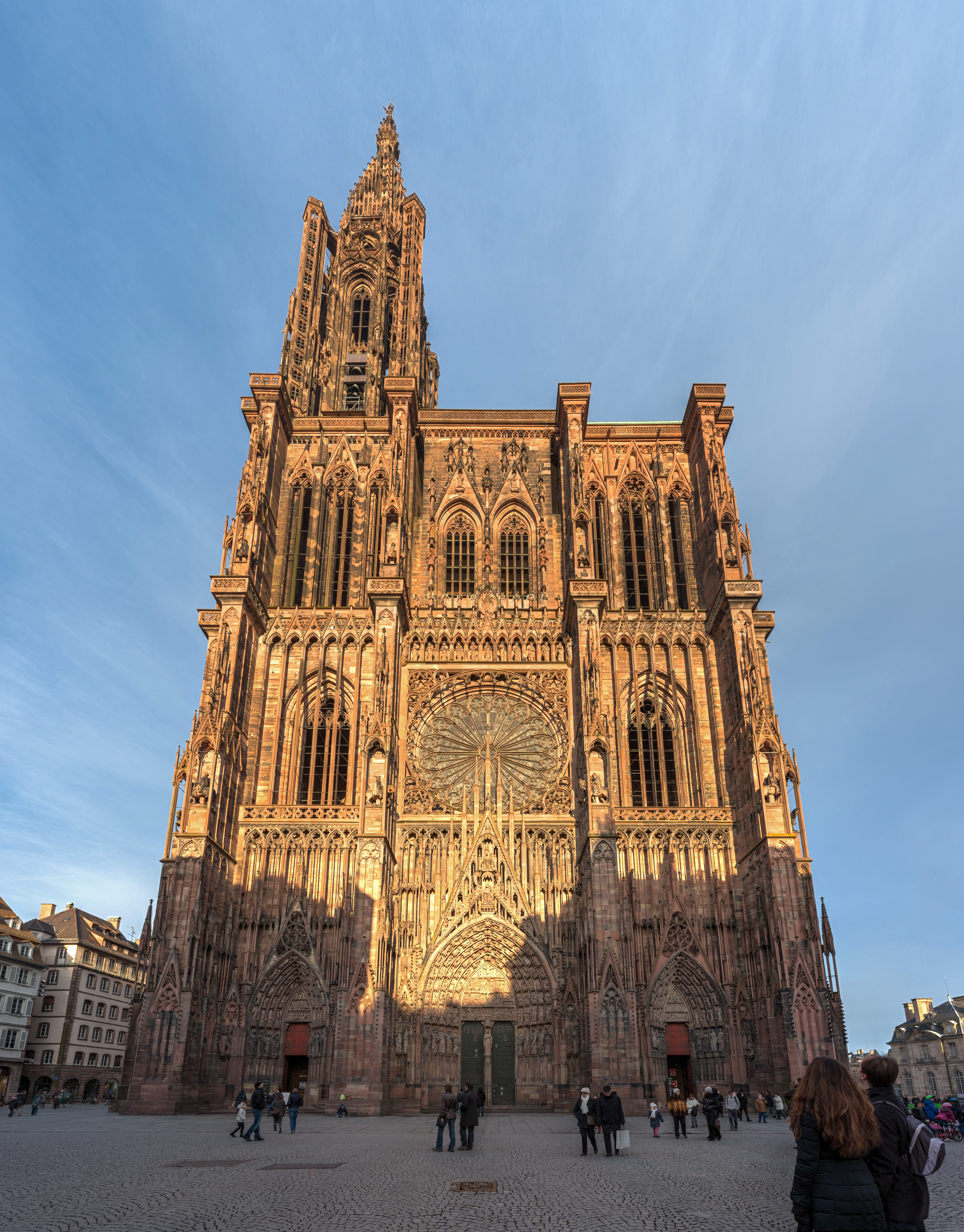
West front of Strasbourg Cathedral from the Place de la Cathédrale

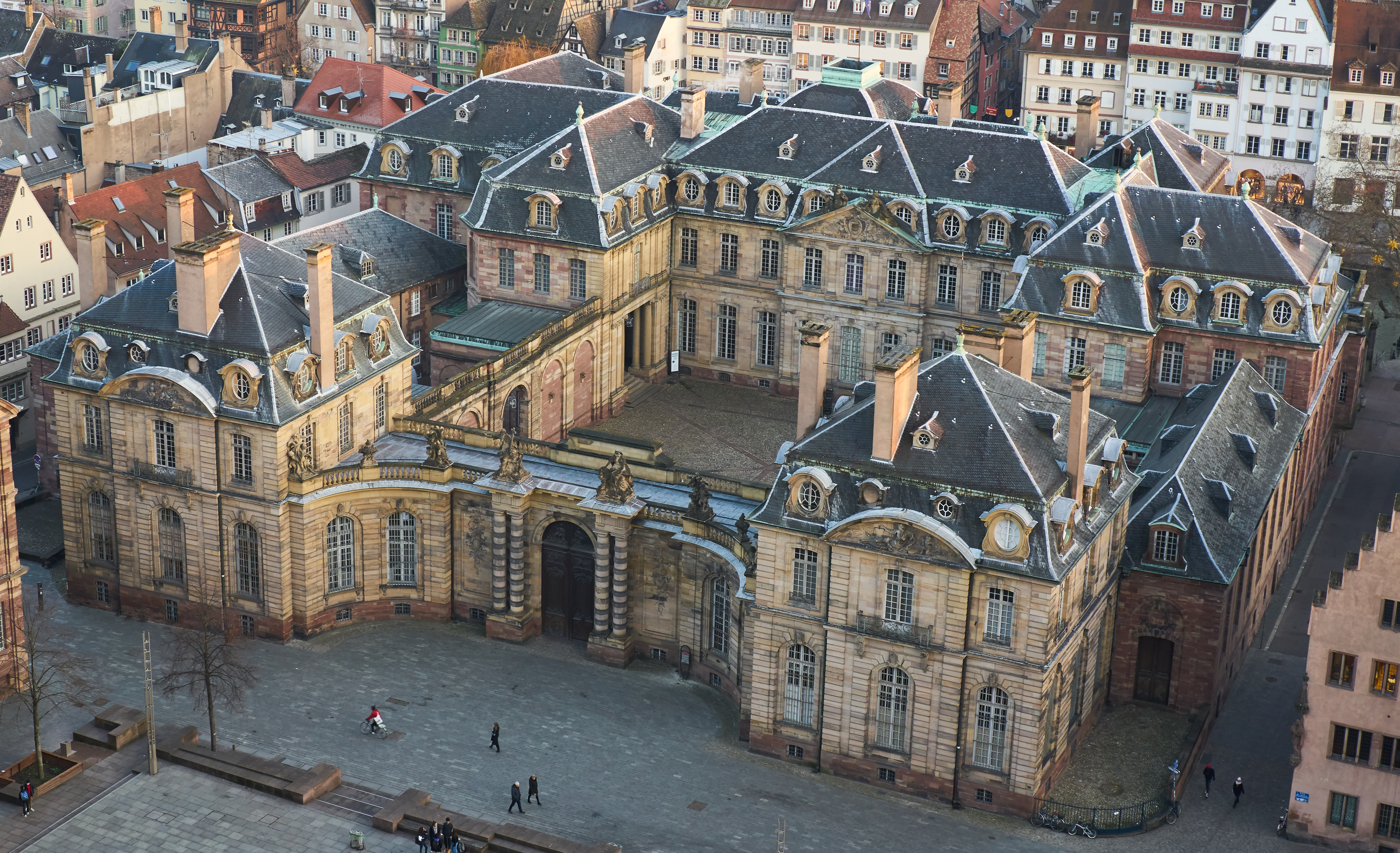
Aerial view of the Palais Rohan from the cathedral's platform

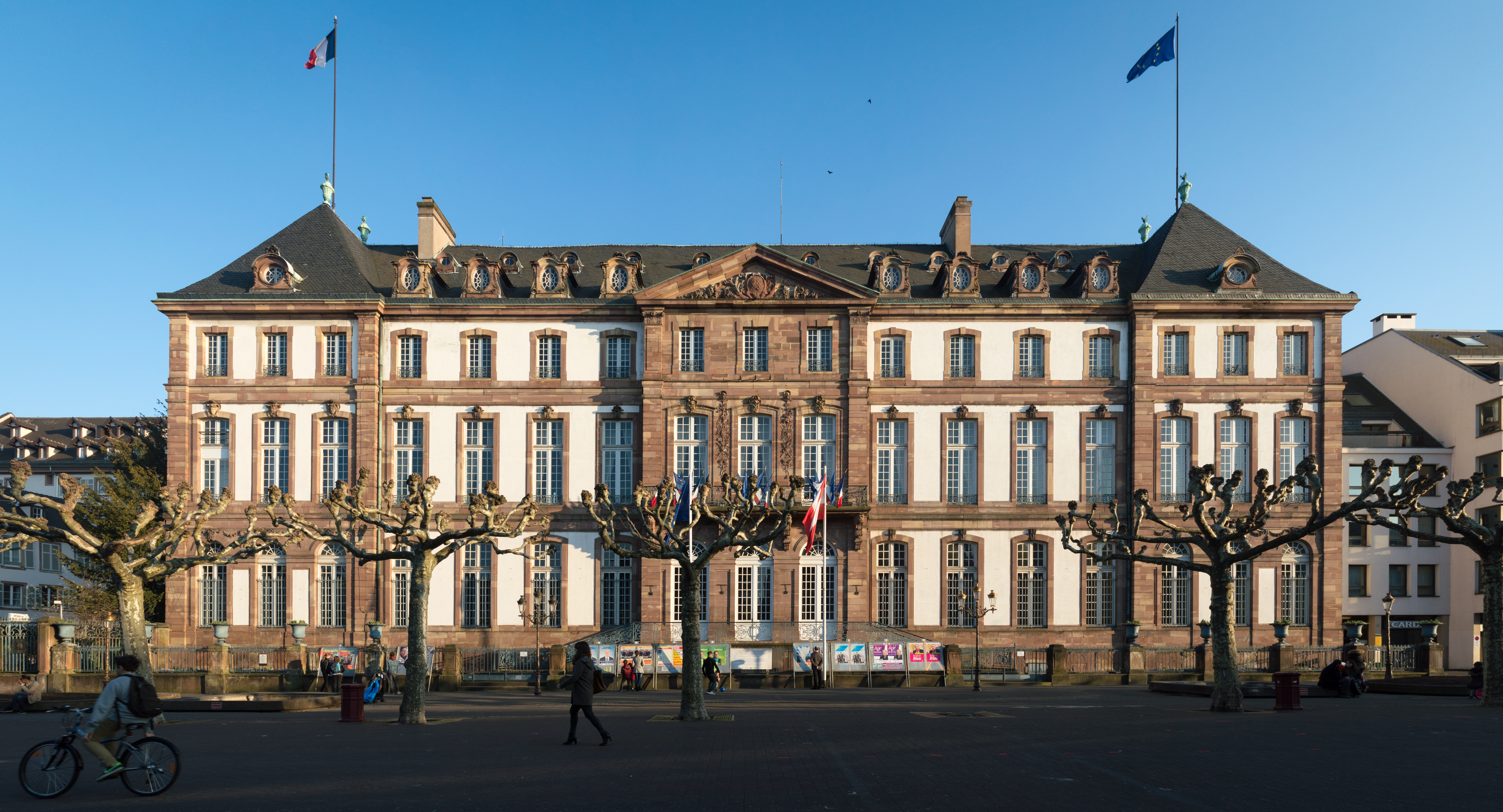
Façade of the City Hall, former Hôtel de Hanau-Lichtenberg

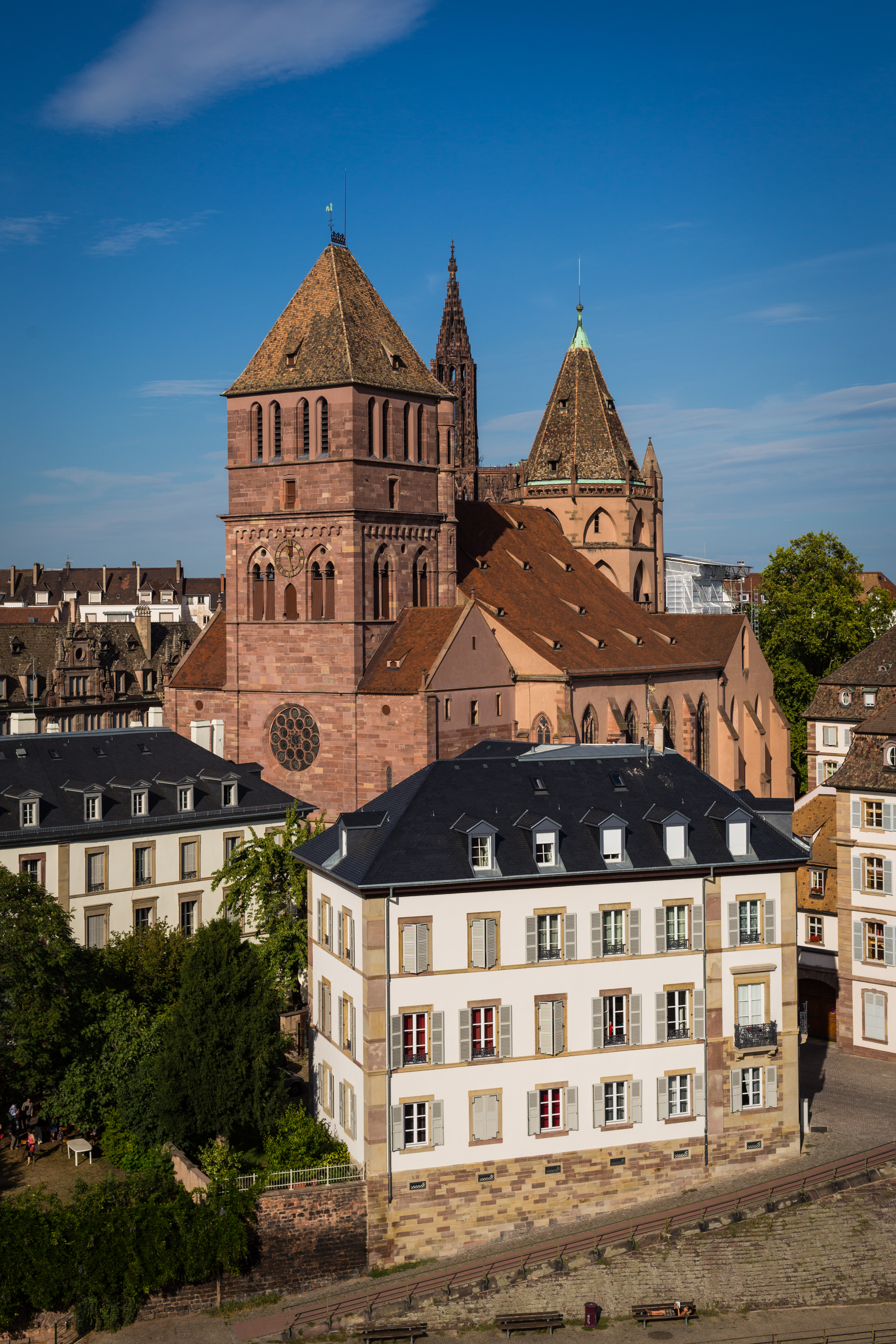
Aerial view of St. Thomas' Church from across the Ill river

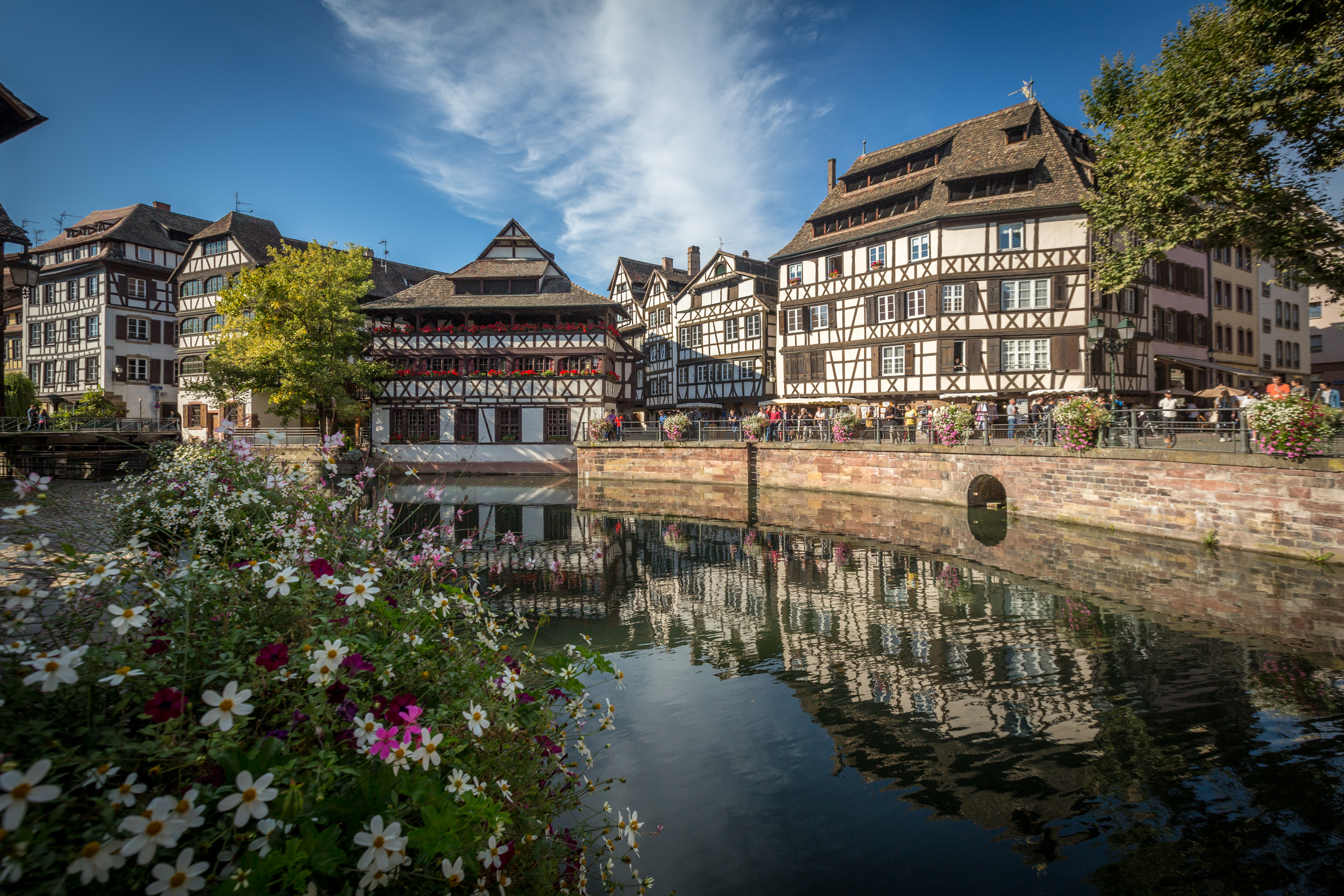
Maison des Tanneurs and the Place Benjamin Zix in Petite France

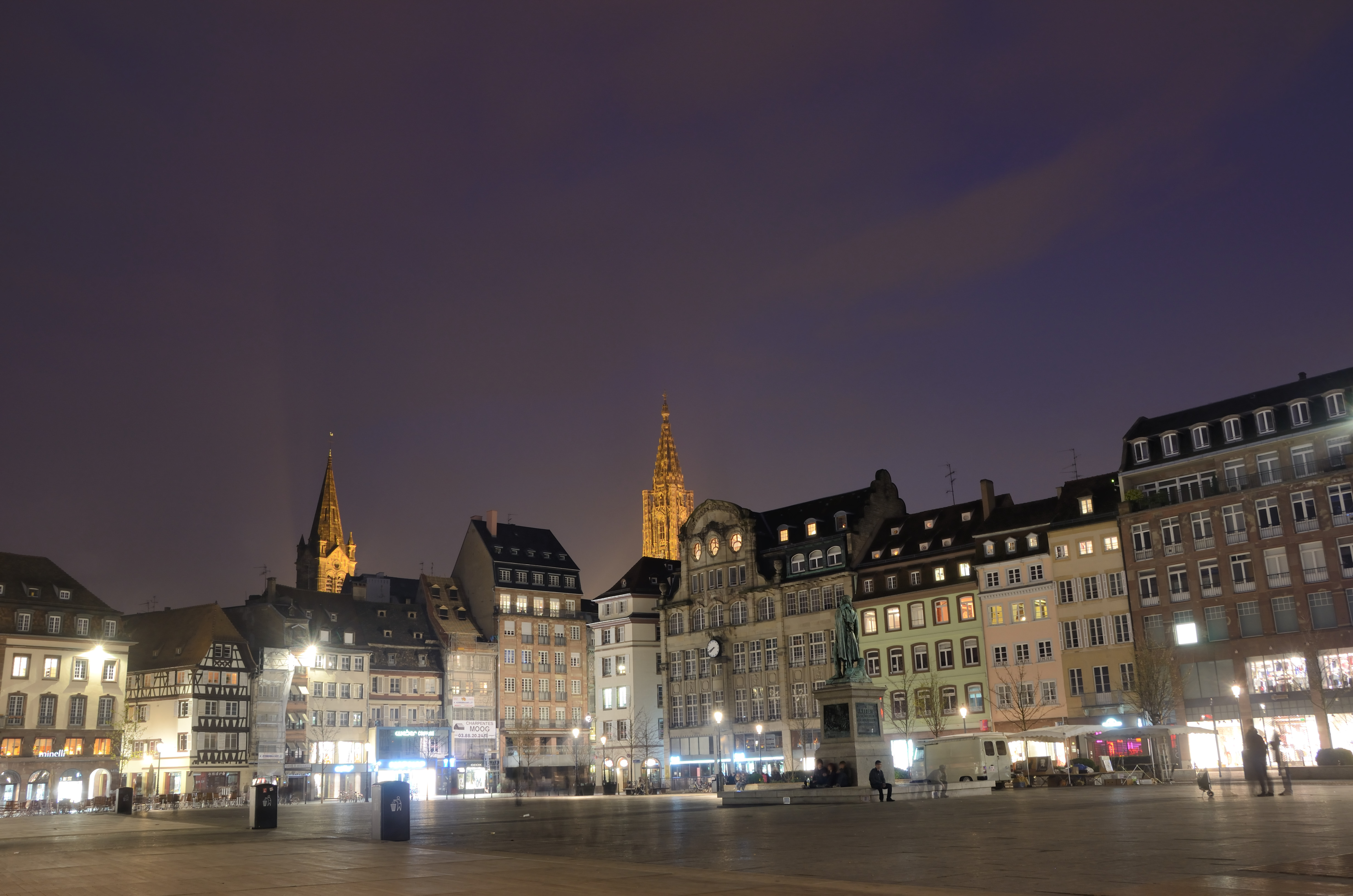
Panoramic view of the Place Kléber by night

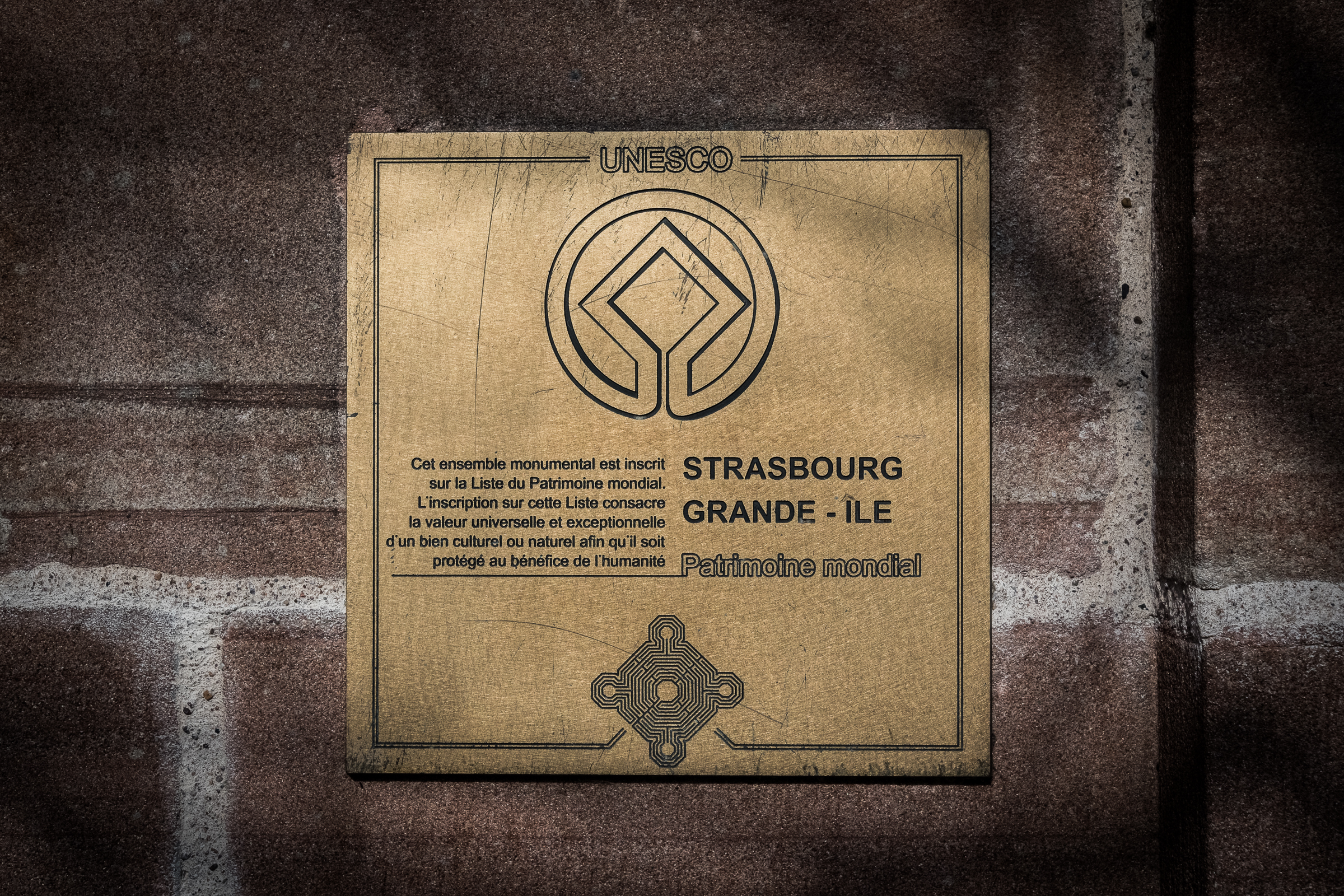
UNESCO World heritage brass plate affixed to the Corbeau bridge
