= Ancienne Douane (Strasbourg) =

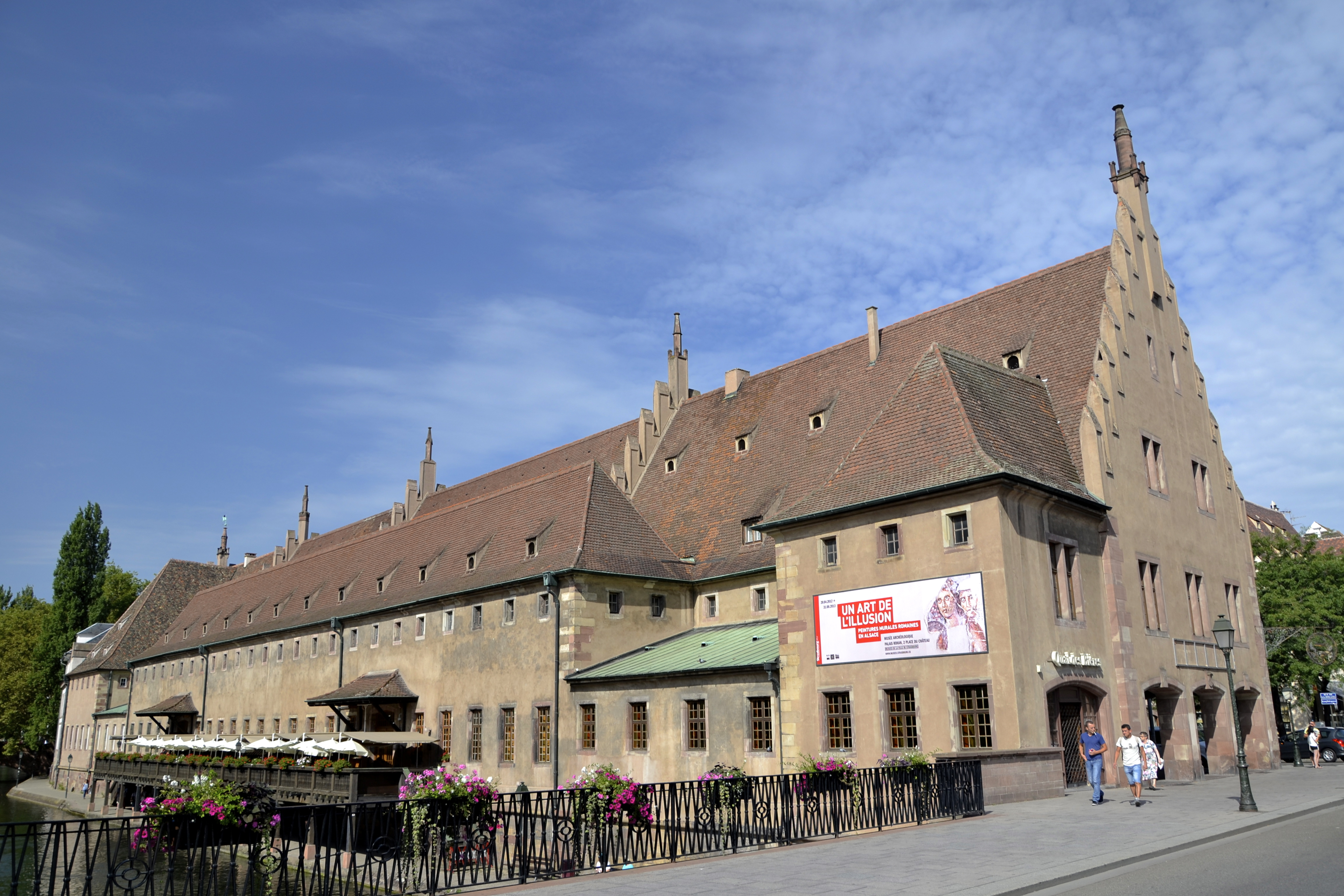
- South side of Ancienne Douane and the river Ill in 2012

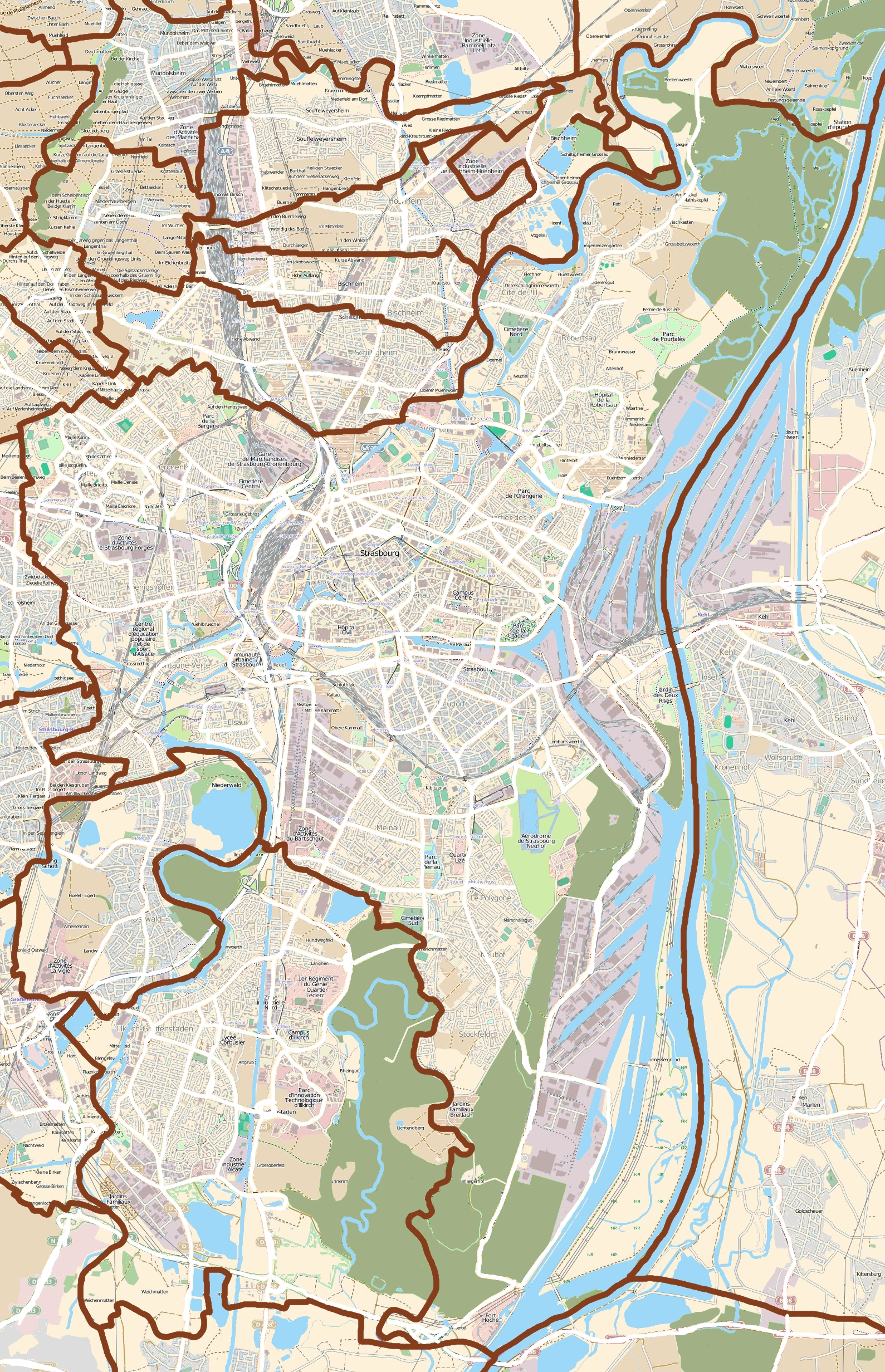
- Location within Strasbourg
- Former names: German: Kaufhaus; German: Markthalle

General information
- Type: customs house
- Architectural style: Gothic
- Location: Strasbourg, France, 6, rue de la Douane
- Coordinates: 48°34′46″N 7°45′00″E
- Construction started: 1358
- Completed: 1389
- Renovated: 1962–1965
- Destroyed: 1944
- Owner: Municipality of Strasbourg

Design and construction
- Architect: Robert Will (reconstruction)

Ancienne Douane (French pronunciation: [ɑ̃sjɛn dwan], "Old Custom house") is a 14th-century building on the Grande Île, the historic city centre of Strasbourg, France. The structure is classified as a monument historique by the French Ministry of Culture since 1948.

The custom house was built in 1358 and enlarged in 1389. It was heavily damaged by British and American bombing raids on 11 August 1944 and left as a ruin for almost two decades before being rebuilt according to the medieval plans by architect Robert Will (1910–1998).

The Ancienne Douane currently houses a restaurant and a covered market.
