= Barrage Vauban =

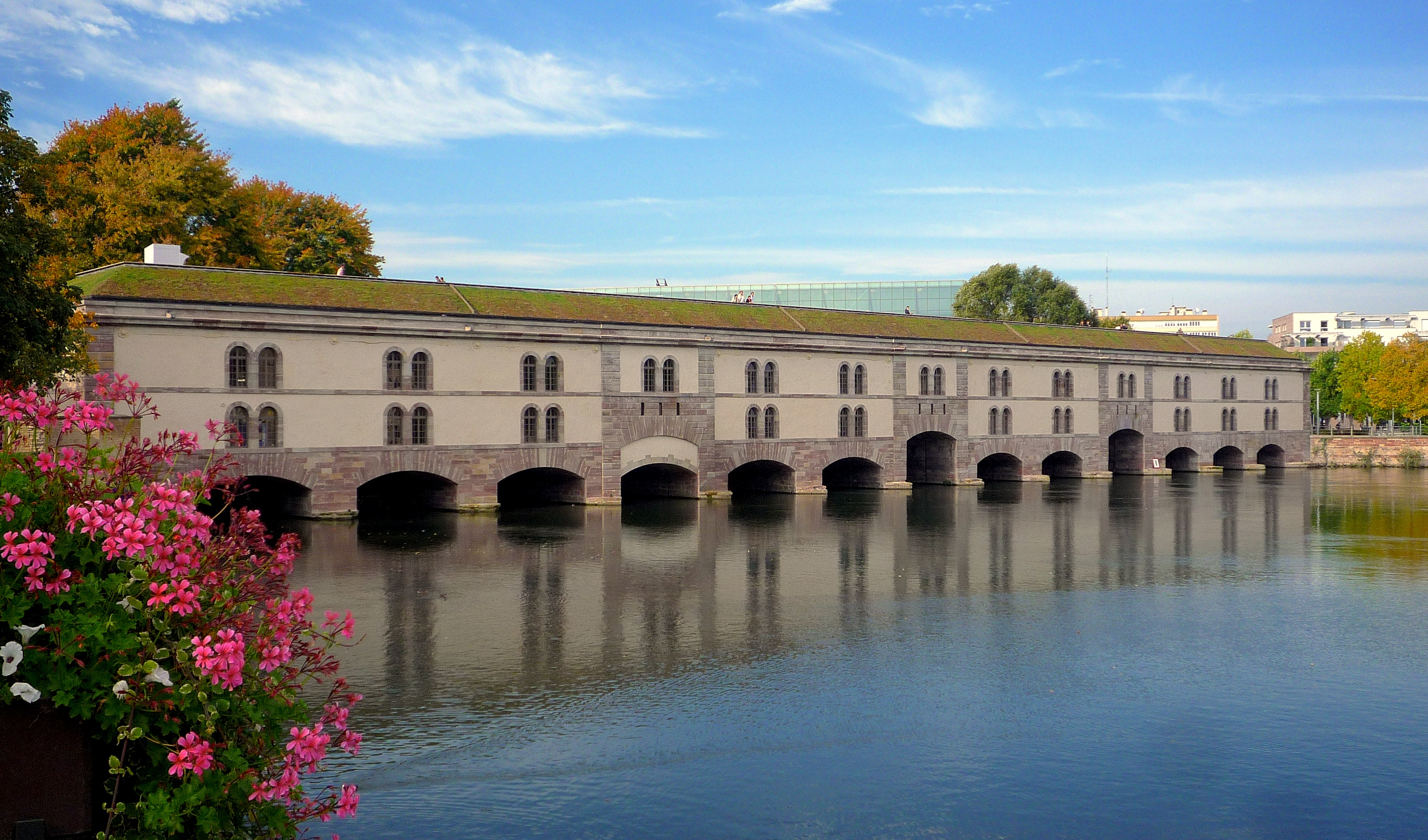
- The downstream side of the barrage after restoration in 2012
- Coordinates: 48°34′46″N 7°44′17″E
- Crosses: River Ill
- Locale: Strasbourg, France

Characteristics
- Total length: 120 m (390 ft)

History
- Opened: 1690

Location
- Interactive map of Barrage Vauban

The Barrage Vauban, or Vauban Dam, is a bridge, weir and defensive work erected in the 17th century on the River Ill in Strasbourg, France. At that time, it was known as the Great Lock (grande écluse), although it does not function as a navigation lock in the modern sense of the word. Today it serves to display sculptures and has a viewing terrace on its roof, with views of the earlier Ponts Couverts bridges and Petite France quarter. It has been classified as a Monument historique since 1971.

The barrage was constructed from 1686 to 1690 in pink Vosges sandstone by the French engineer Jacques Tarade according to plans by Vauban. The principal defensive function of the barrage was to enable, in the event of an attack, the raising the level of the River Ill and thus the flooding of all the lands south of the city, making them impassable to the enemy. This defensive measure was deployed in 1870, when Strasbourg was besieged by Prussian forces during the Franco-Prussian War, and resulted in the complete flooding of the northern part of the suburb of Neudorf.

The barrage has 13 arches and is 120 metres (390 ft) in length. Within the structure an enclosed corridor links the two banks and a lapidarium serves to display ancient plaster casts and copies of statues and gargoyles from Strasbourg Cathedral and the Palais Rohan. Three of the arches are raised to permit navigation, and the corridor is carried across these by drawbridges. The roof was rebuilt in 1965–66 in order to construct the panoramic terrace. Admission to the barrage and terrace is free, and they are open daily from 09:00 to 19:30.

The Strasbourg Museum of Modern and Contemporary Art and the Commanderie Saint-Jean, now home to the prestigious École Nationale d'Administration, are both adjacent to the northern end of the barrage. The headquarters (Hôtel du Département) of the Bas-Rhin department is by the southern end.

== Gallery ==
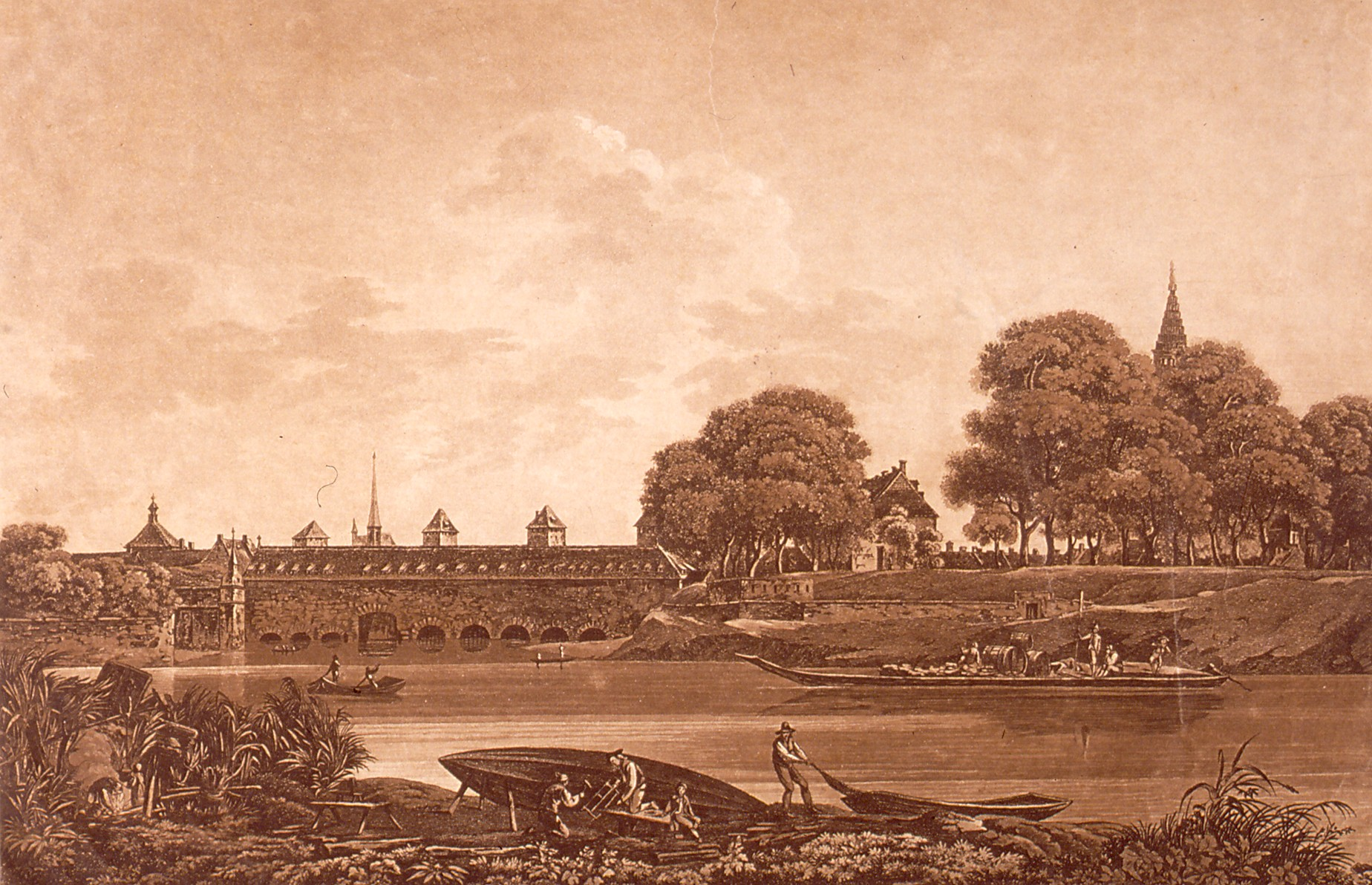
An image of the upstream side of the barrage from 1750

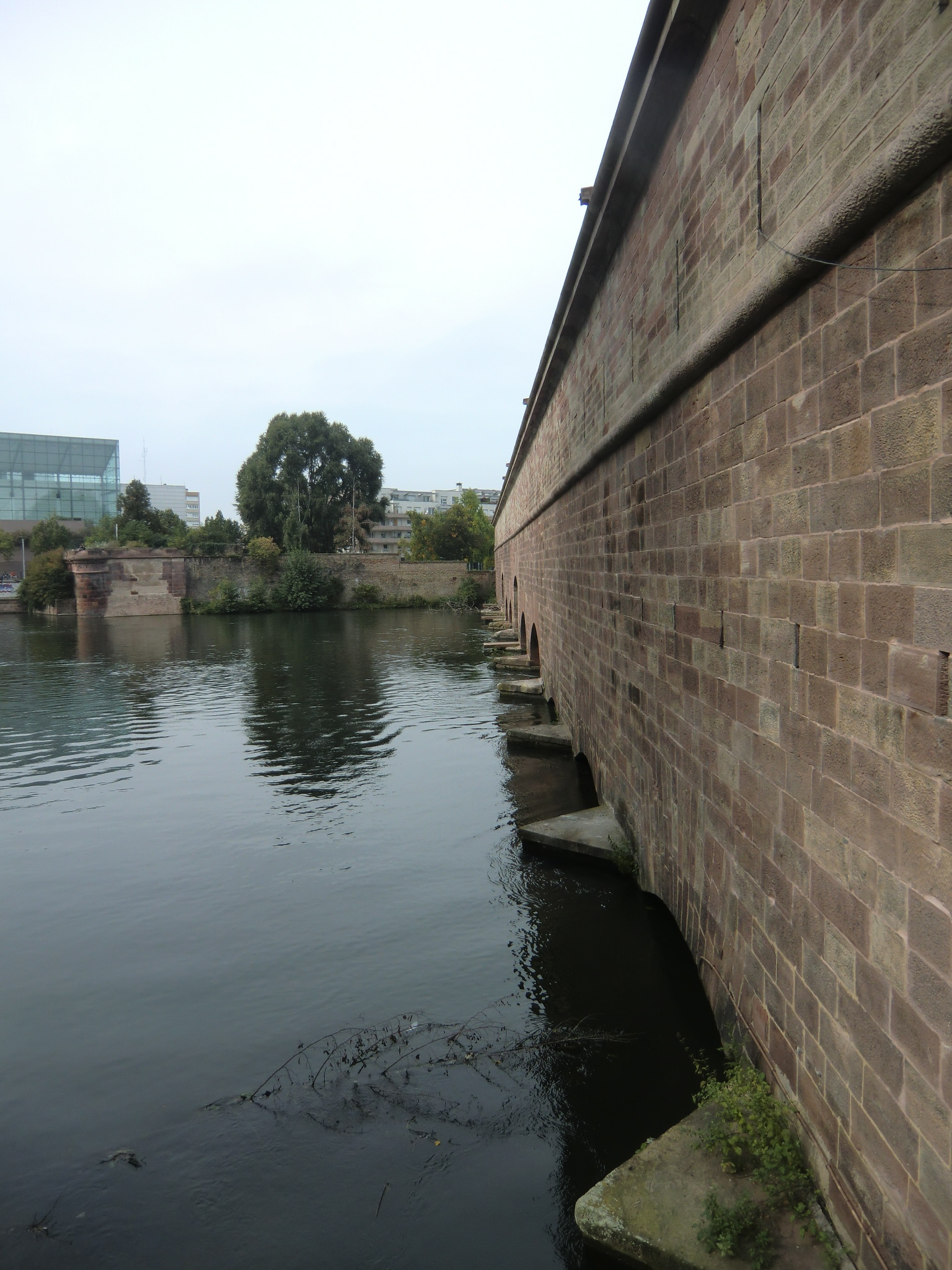
Upstream side of the barrage showing the stonework

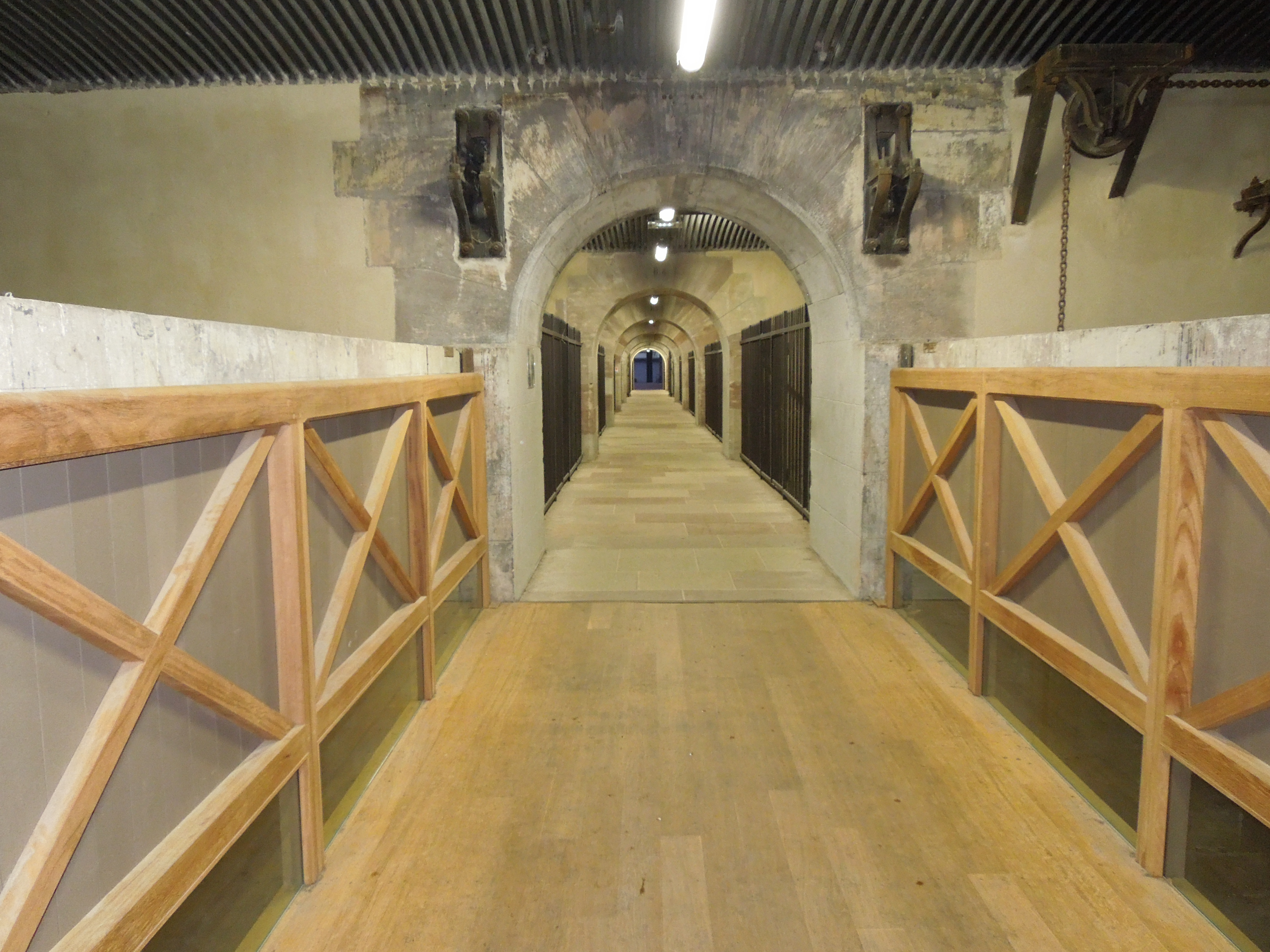
The internal corridor

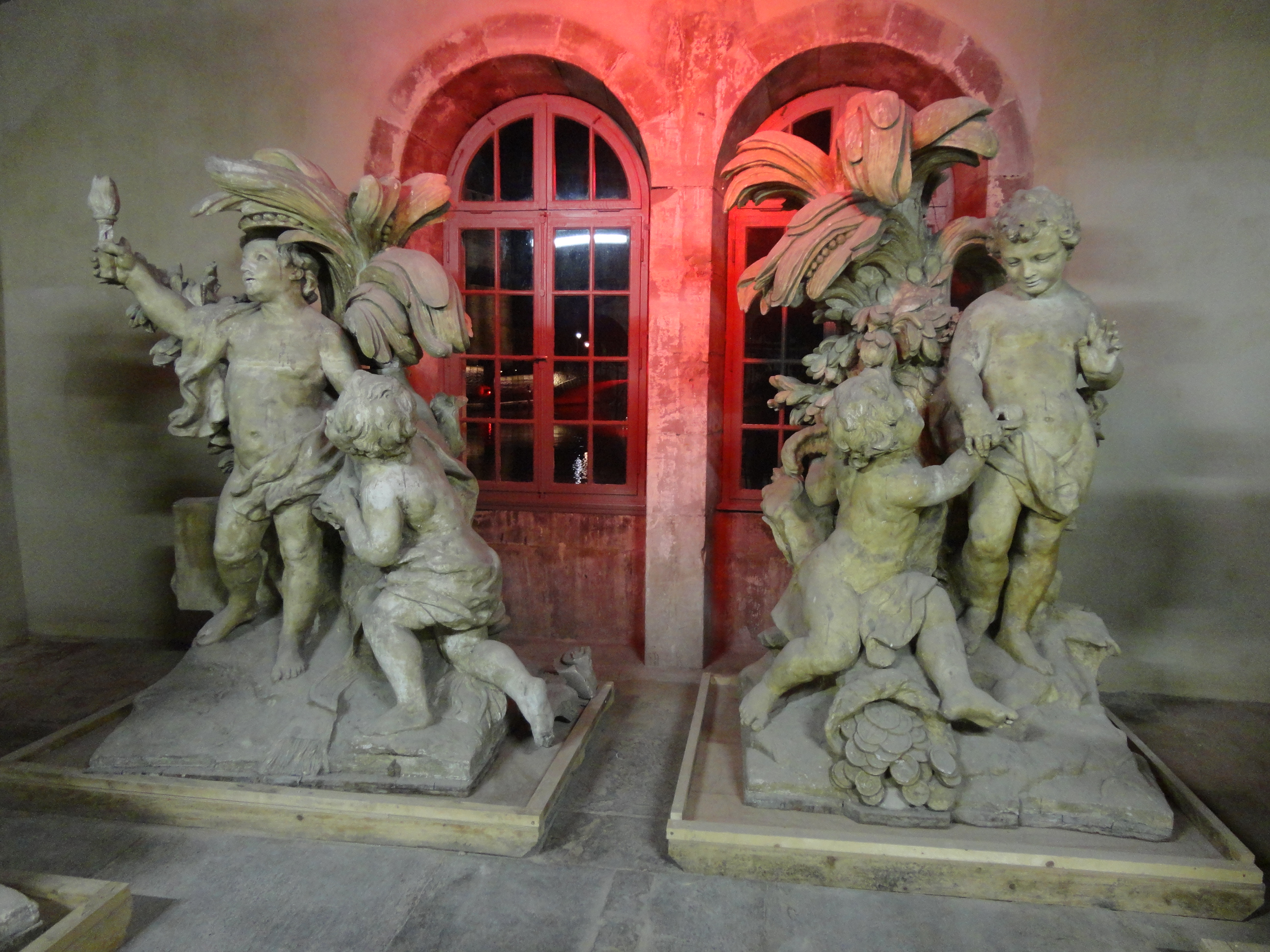
Statues from the Palais Rohan in the lapidarium

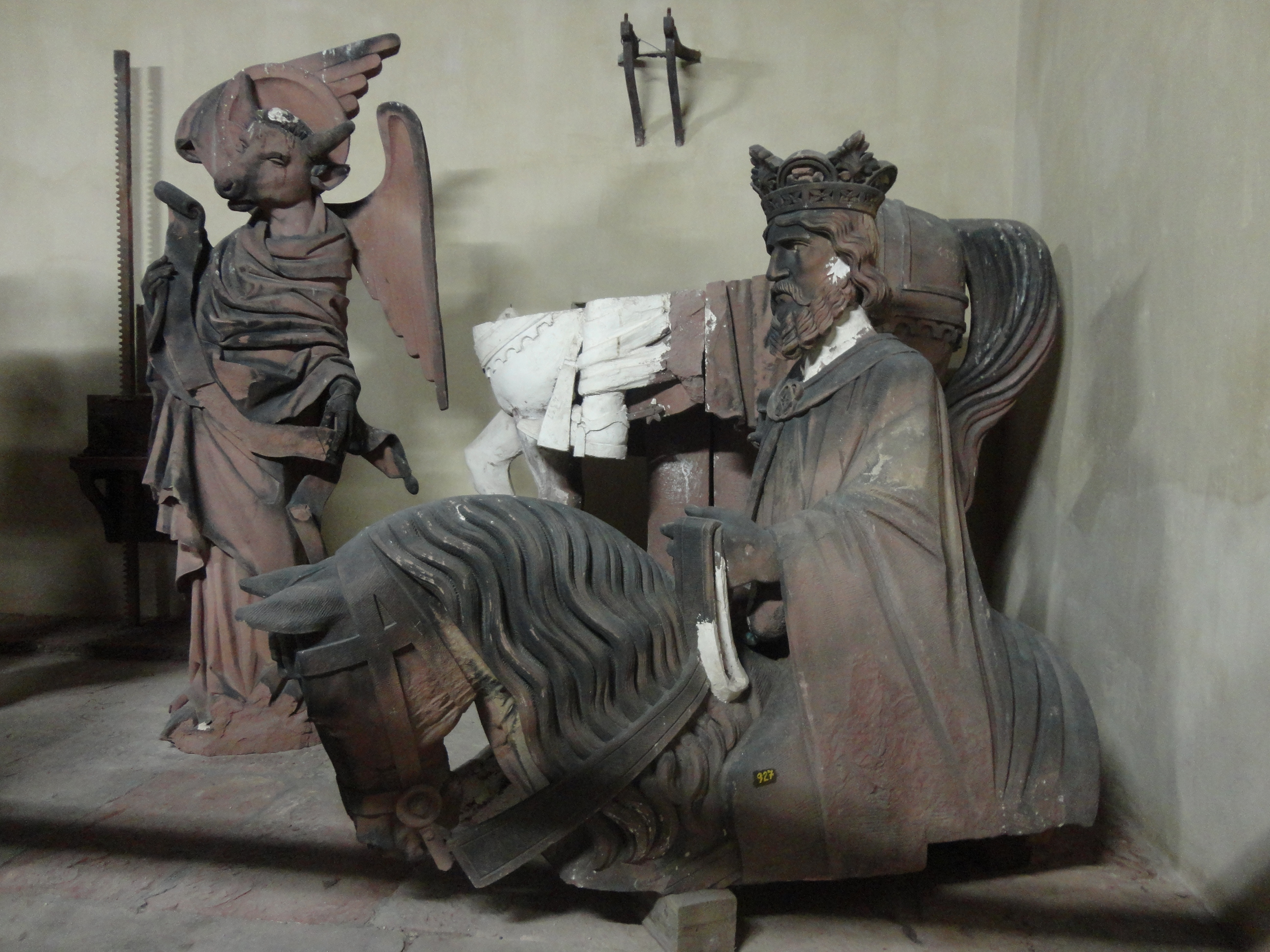
Statues from Strasbourg Cathedral in the lapidarium

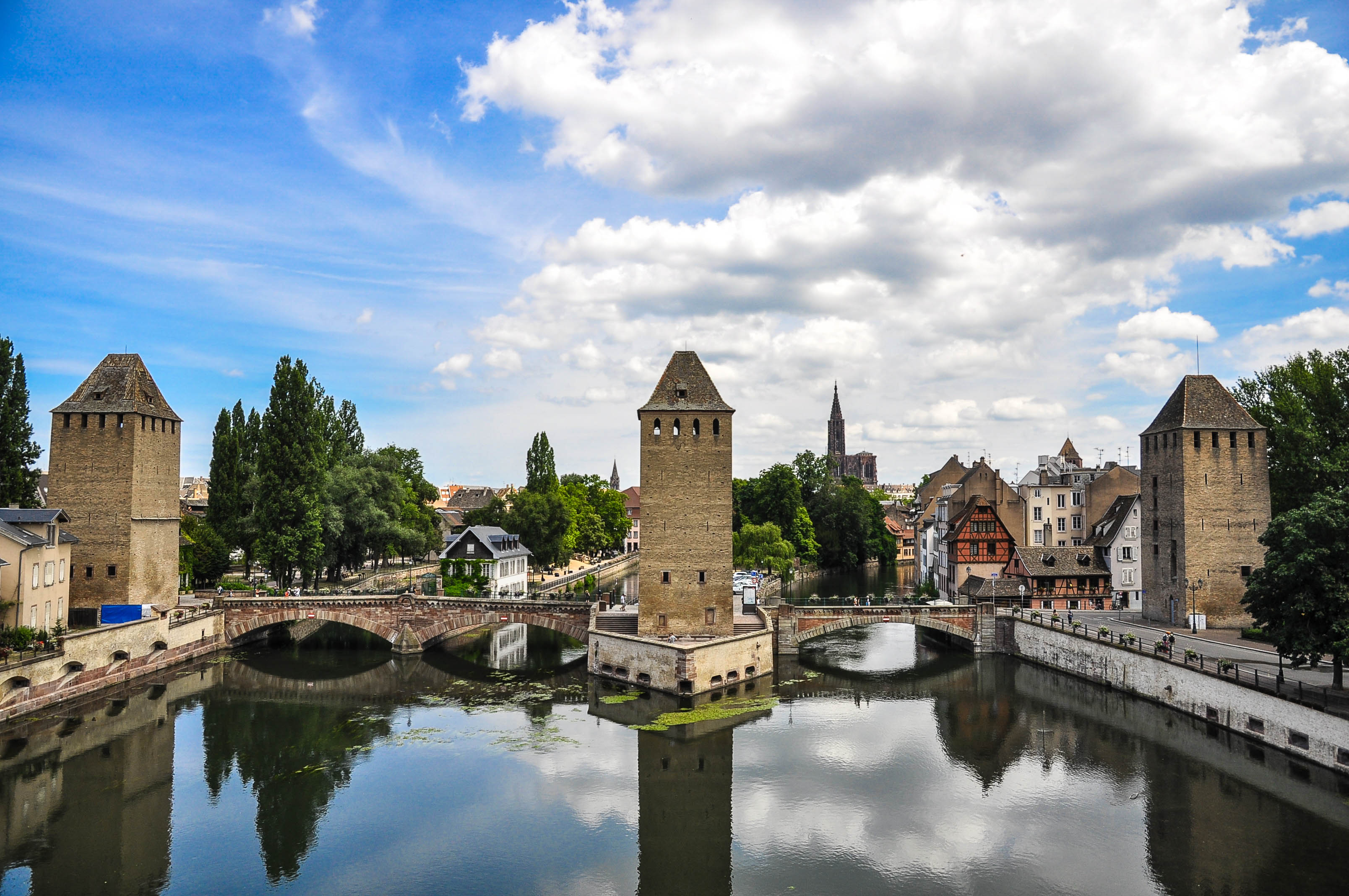
View of part of the Ponts Couverts and Petite France from the terrace
