= Petite France, Strasbourg =

Petite France Französel
- Quarter
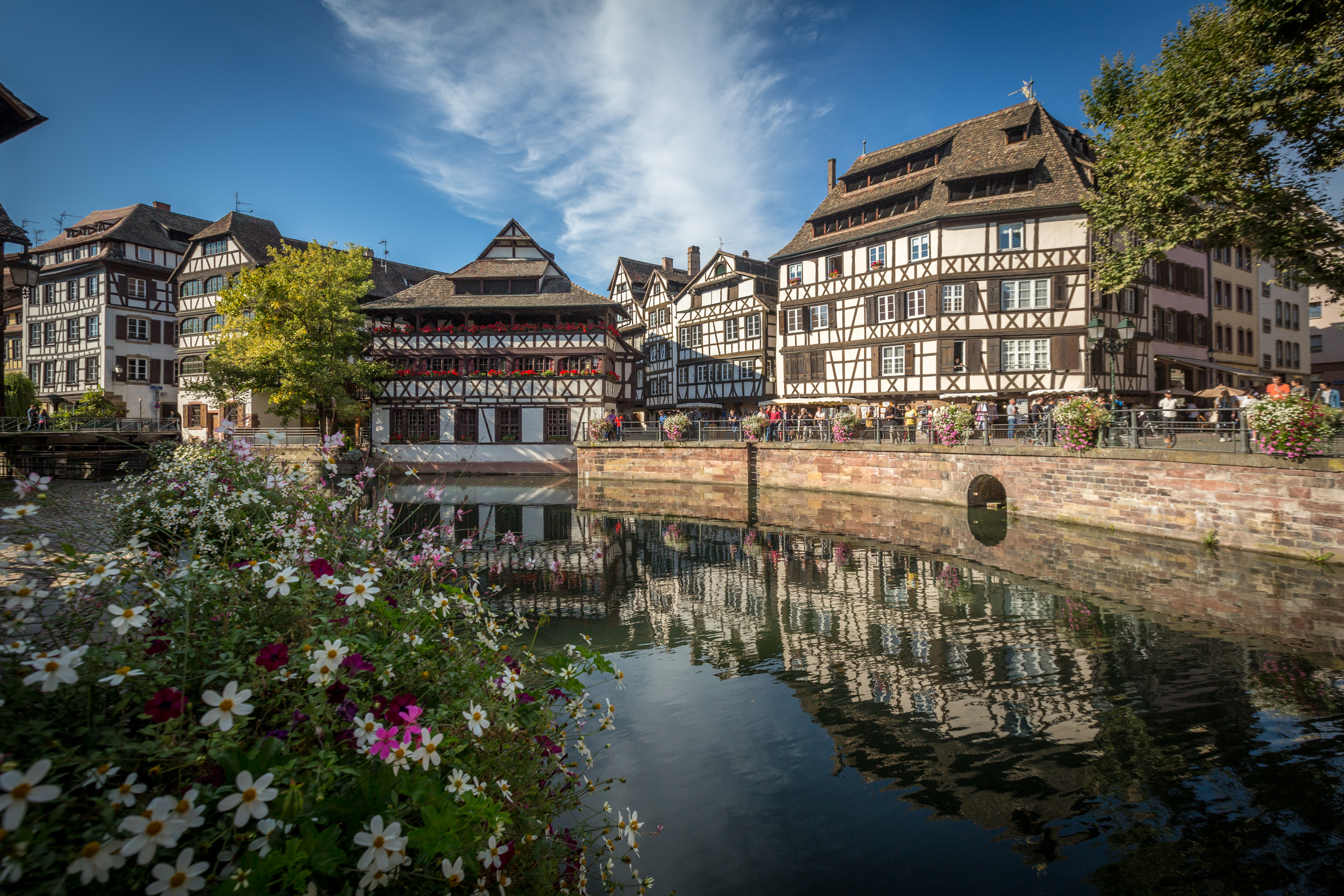
- The Maison des Tanneurs and the Place Benjamin-Zix in the heart of the quarter

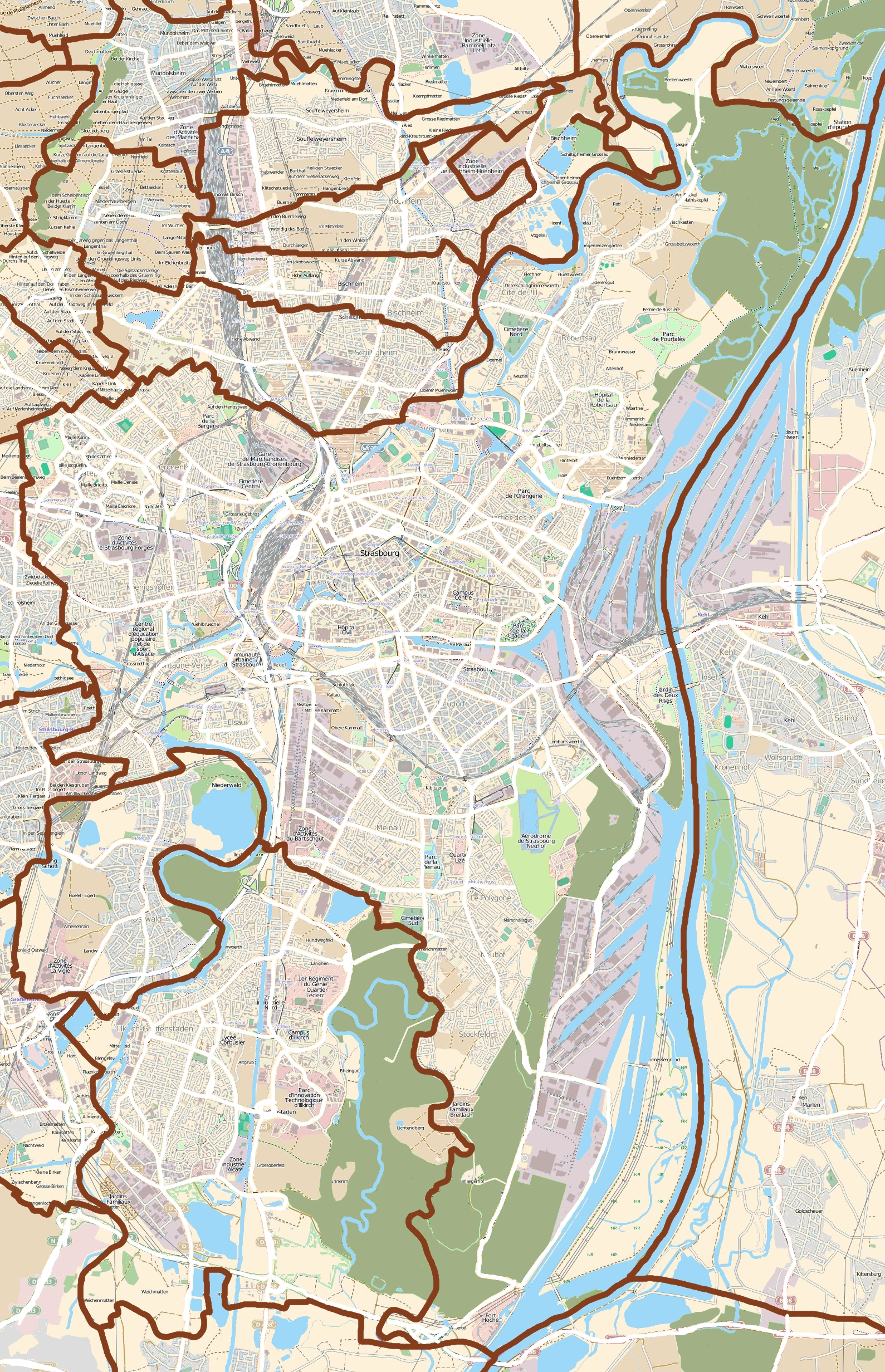
- The Petite France in relation to the city of Strasbourg
- Coordinates: 48°34′51″N 7°44′26″E
- Country: France
- Region: Alsace
- Department: Bas-Rhin
- Commune: Strasbourg

The Petite France (French pronunciation: [pətit fʁɑ̃s]), in Alsatian dialect: Französel; "Little France"), also known as the Quartier des Tanneurs ("Tanner's Quarter") is the south-western part of the Grande Île of Strasbourg, France, the most central and characteristic island of the city that forms the historic centre.

The district is bounded to the north by the Quai de la Bruche (Brischstade), the Rue du Bain-aux-Plantes, the Place Benjamin-Zix and the Rue des Dentelles; to the east by the Rue du Pont-Saint-Martin, the Pont Saint-Thomas (Thomas Bridge) and the Mills footbridge; to the south by the Channel of Zorn-Mühle; and to the west by the Covered Bridges.

At the Petite France, the river Ill splits up into a number of channels that cascade through an area that was, in the Middle Ages, home to the city's tanners, millers and fishermen, and is now one of Strasbourg's main tourist attractions. The Petite France forms part of the UNESCO World Heritage Site of the Grande Île, designated in 1988.

== History ==
=== Pflanzbad, Mühlenplan, Gedeckte Brücken ===
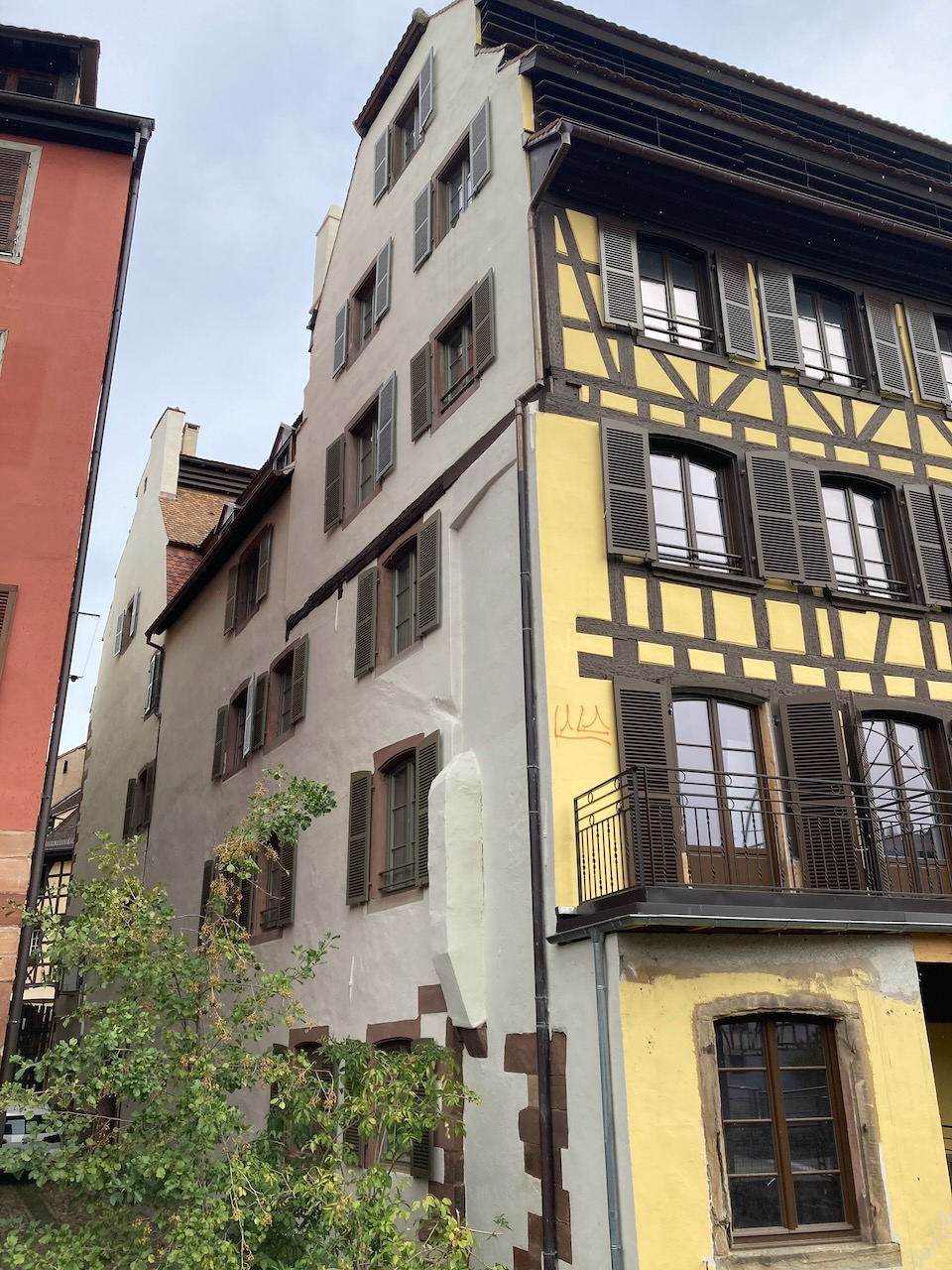
Former Huguenot tannery Bury, Rue des Dentelles 12

The Petite France district did not emerge as an urban entity until the 20th century. Originally, the term "Little France" was reserved for the dam that separates the Spitzmühlen Canal from the shipping canal. Up until the 19th century, the three units that make up the district today were called in Alsatian dialect "Am Pflanzbad", "Der Mühlenplan" and "Bei den Gedeckten Brücken".

In the 13th century, the Rue du Bain-aux-Plantes, the main street of the quarter, was known as Glanzhof, in the 15th century it became the Pflanzhof, and later the Pflanzbad. This designation referred to a public bathhouse (No. 22) in which women underwent a bath treatment with fragrant and beneficial herbs.

The "Mühlenplan" still corresponds to the Rue des Moulins, which is sometimes also called the mill quarter. The Petite France is therefore not a historical district in the narrower sense, but a picturesque district that emerged with its narrow alleys of half-timbered houses on the banks of the Ill and was not very popular at the time because of the tanneries (white and red tanners) and the associated smells. In addition to the tanners and mill owners, poor fishermen, executioners and prostitutes also lived here. Due to the poverty, many houses were built in half-timbered construction. The origin goes back to the 16th century.

Just upstream of the Petite France, the river Ill flows through the Barrage Vauban, a defensive structure built at the end of the 17th century. Downstream of this, the river splits into the Canal du Faux-Rempart, which flows to the north of the Grande Île, and four channels which flow through the Petite France quarter before reuniting in the main channel of the river, flowing to the south of the Grande Île. These four channels are spanned by the Ponts Couverts, an earlier defensive structure of three bridges and four towers that, despite its name, has not been covered since the 18th century.

Downstream of the Ponts Couverts, the four channels flow through an area of largely half-timbered buildings which, together with the narrow lanes and footbridges that connect them, mostly date from the 16th and 17th centuries. The sloping roofs of many of the buildings include open lofts where hides were once dried. Three of the four channels flowing through the quarter run over weirs that once drove mills and other industries, whilst the northernmost channel is navigable. This passes through a lock and the Pont du Faisan swing bridge in the centre of the quarter, and is largely used by passenger trip boats.

On the north bank of the Ill at the heart of the quarter is the Maison des Tanneurs, home of the Tanner's Guild, and the Place Benjamin-Zix. From this square lead several streets, including the Rue du Bain-aux-Plantes and the Rue des Dentelles, also lined by half-timbered houses. To the east these lead to the Saint-Thomas church, the city’s main Lutheran church, and to the west back to the Pont Couverts and to the Saint-Pierre-le-Vieux church, actually two churches (one Protestant and one Catholic) in the same building.

=== Hospice of the Incurable ===
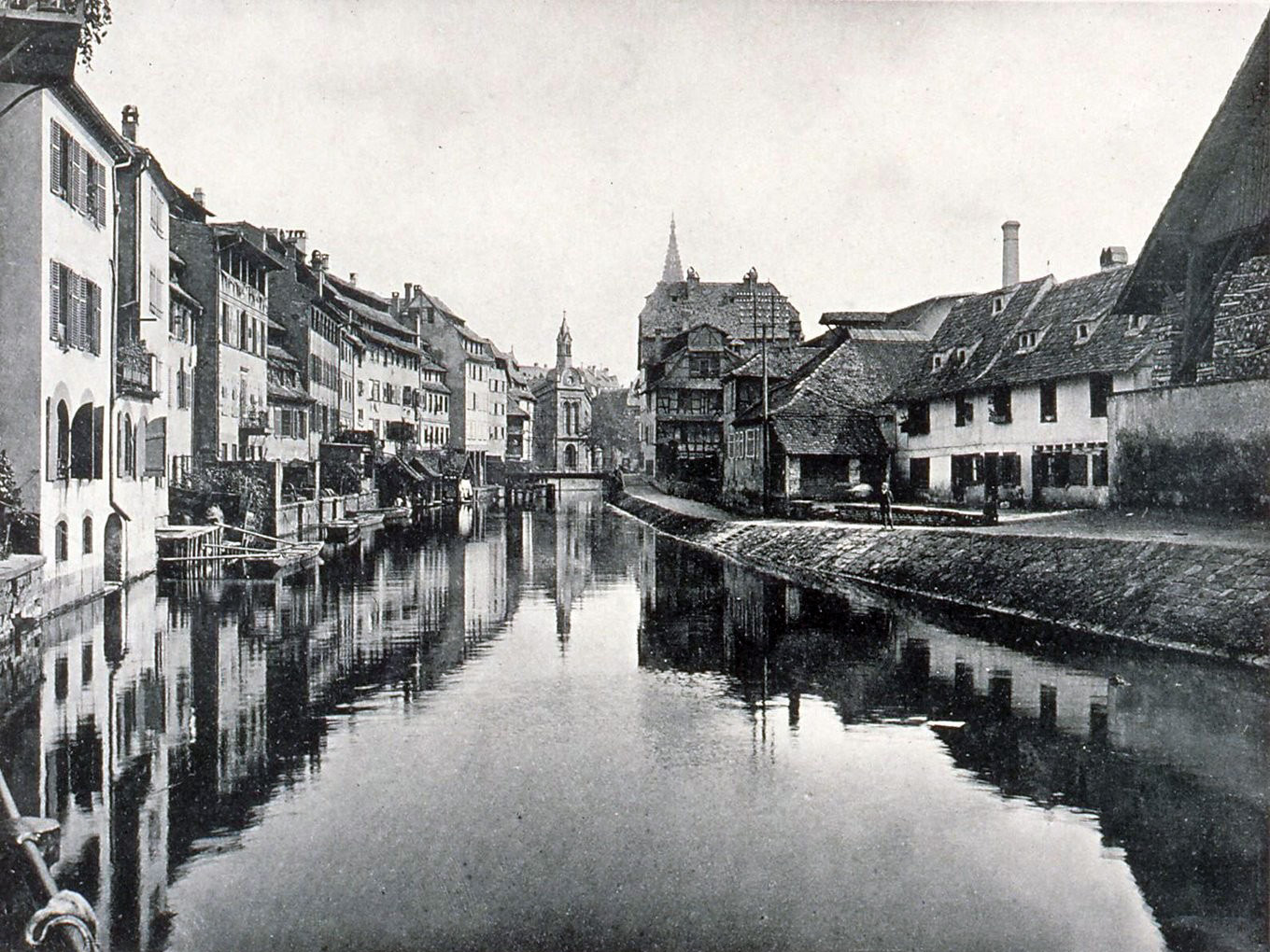
Blodergängel on the right, Quai de la Petite France (1898)

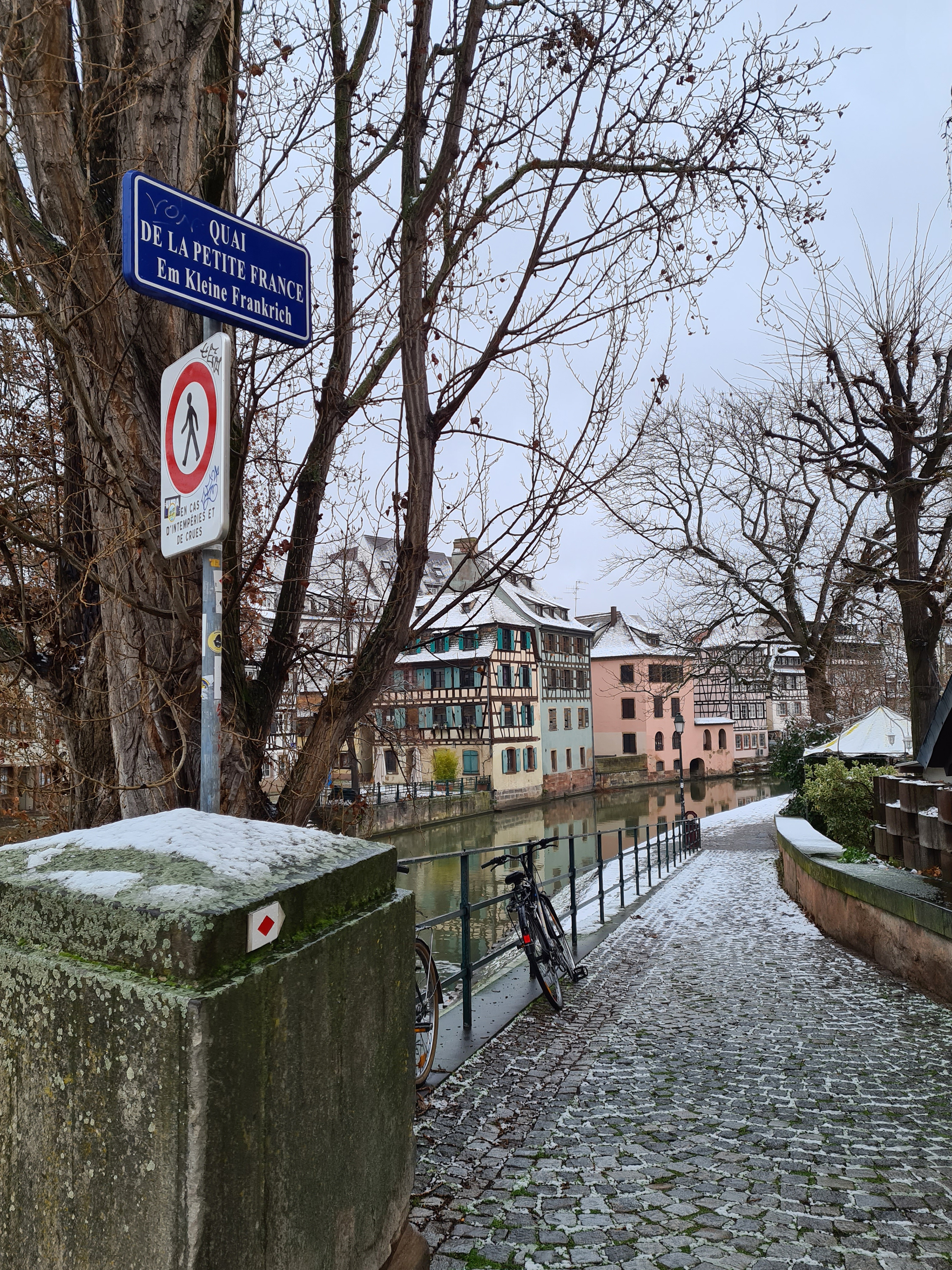
Blodergängel, Quai de la Petite France

The origin of the name Petite-France ("Little France") was not given for patriotic or architectural reasons. It can be found in the Alsatian name Blatterhüs of a hospice for the incurable, originally founded in the Finkwiller district and then moved in 1687 to a new building at 6 rue des Moulins, on what is now the Quai de la Petite-France (Blodergängel in Alsatian during the 18th and 19th centuries), where it operated for a period of almost 300 years until 1789 in the then German-speaking and culturally German-influenced Lutheran University City of Strasbourg. Until 1789, all of Alsace was a foreign country under customs law (province à l'instar de l'étranger effectif), i.e. it had a customs border with France, but not with the Holy Roman Empire. The hospice was founded in 1503 by Gaspard Hofmeister, a citizen of the city, for the Landsknechte of Charles VIII of France, who had contracted syphilis during the Italian wars. The return of the Landsknechte from the siege of Naples brought syphilis to the region. The hospice had been expanded in 1506 and 1522 before being moved in 1687. Syphilis is a disease that appeared suddenly in Europe at the end of the 15th century and soon required considerable care for the often marginalised patients. The population called the hospice "Zum Französel" at the time, as syphilis was considered a "French disease". In the 18th century, the place was called the Hospice of the Incurable. In 1795, the building was referred to as "La Petite France", then by extension the entire district.

== Sights ==
- Maison des Tanneurs (1572), 42 rue du Bain aux Plantes
- Place Benjamin-Zix
- Rue du Bain-aux-Plantes
- Former tannery (1600) of Huguenot Benjamin Bury, 12 rue des Dentelles
- Former tannery (1591) of Henri Haderer
- Église Saint-Martin
- Anciennes Glacières
- Barrage Vauban
- Église méthodiste de Sion
- Ponts couverts
- Blodergängel, Quai de la Petite France
- Four defense towers of the old city wall from the 14th century

== Gallery ==
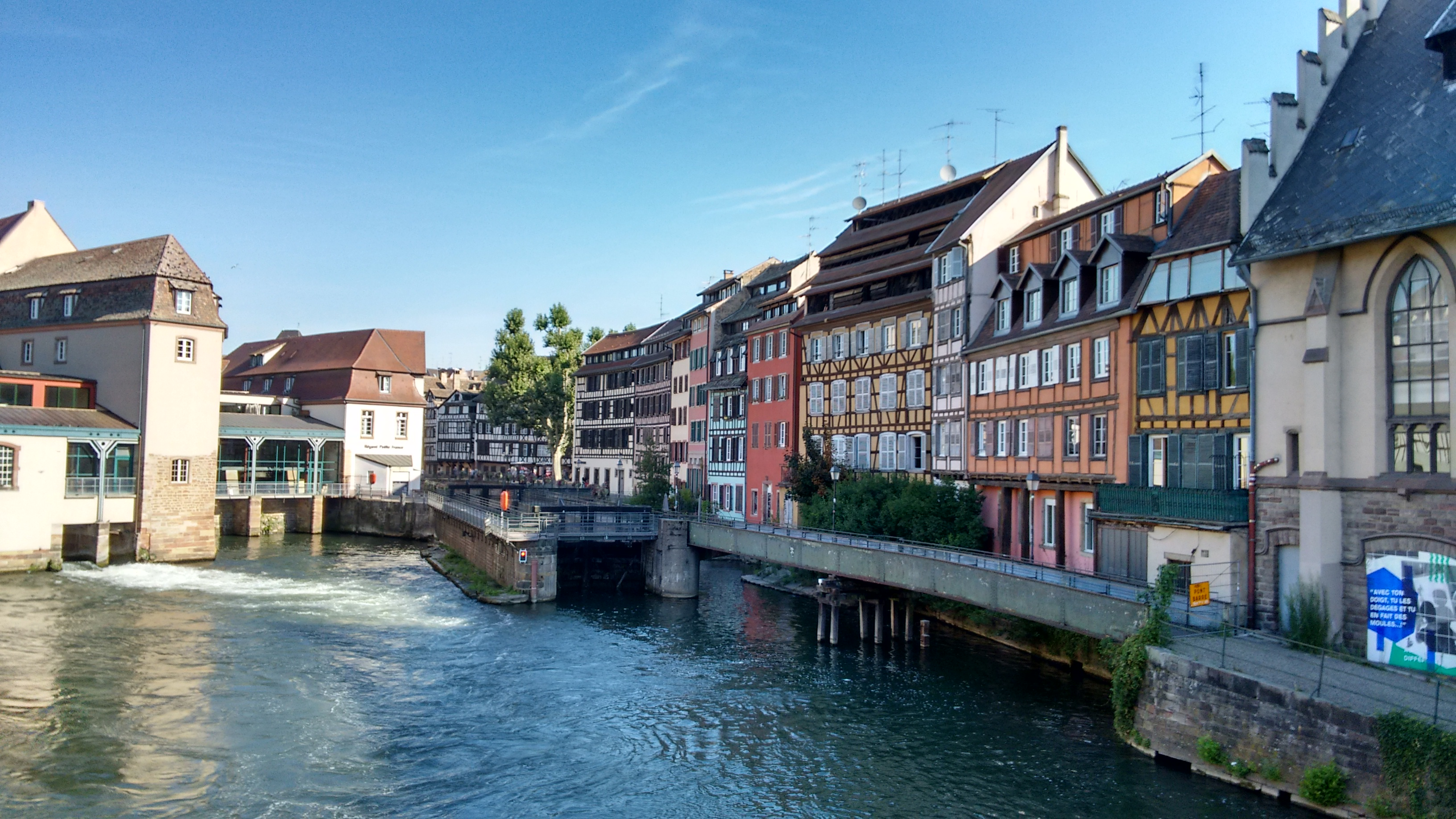
The quarter's weirs, lock and half-timbered buildings

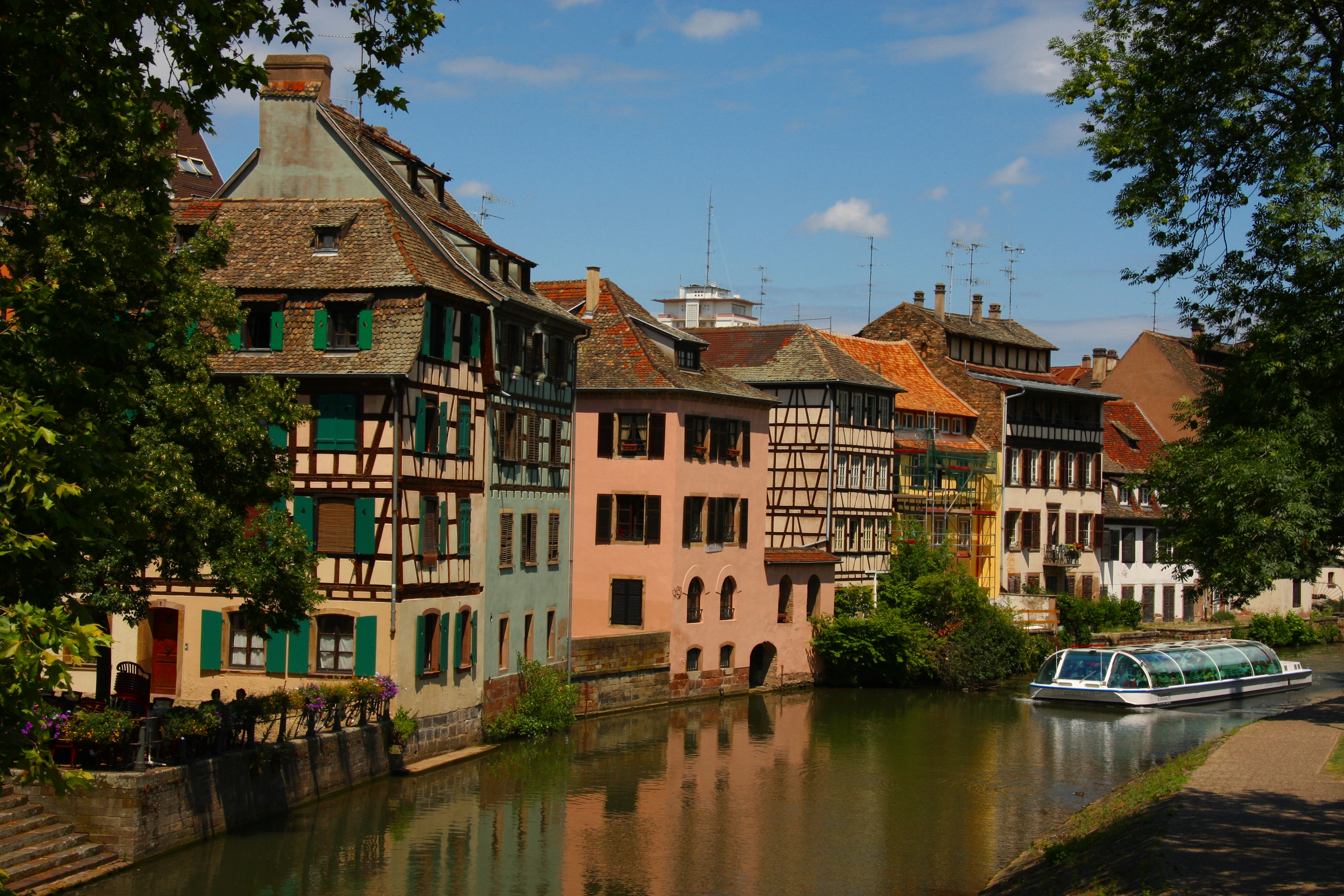
A trip boat on the river Ill

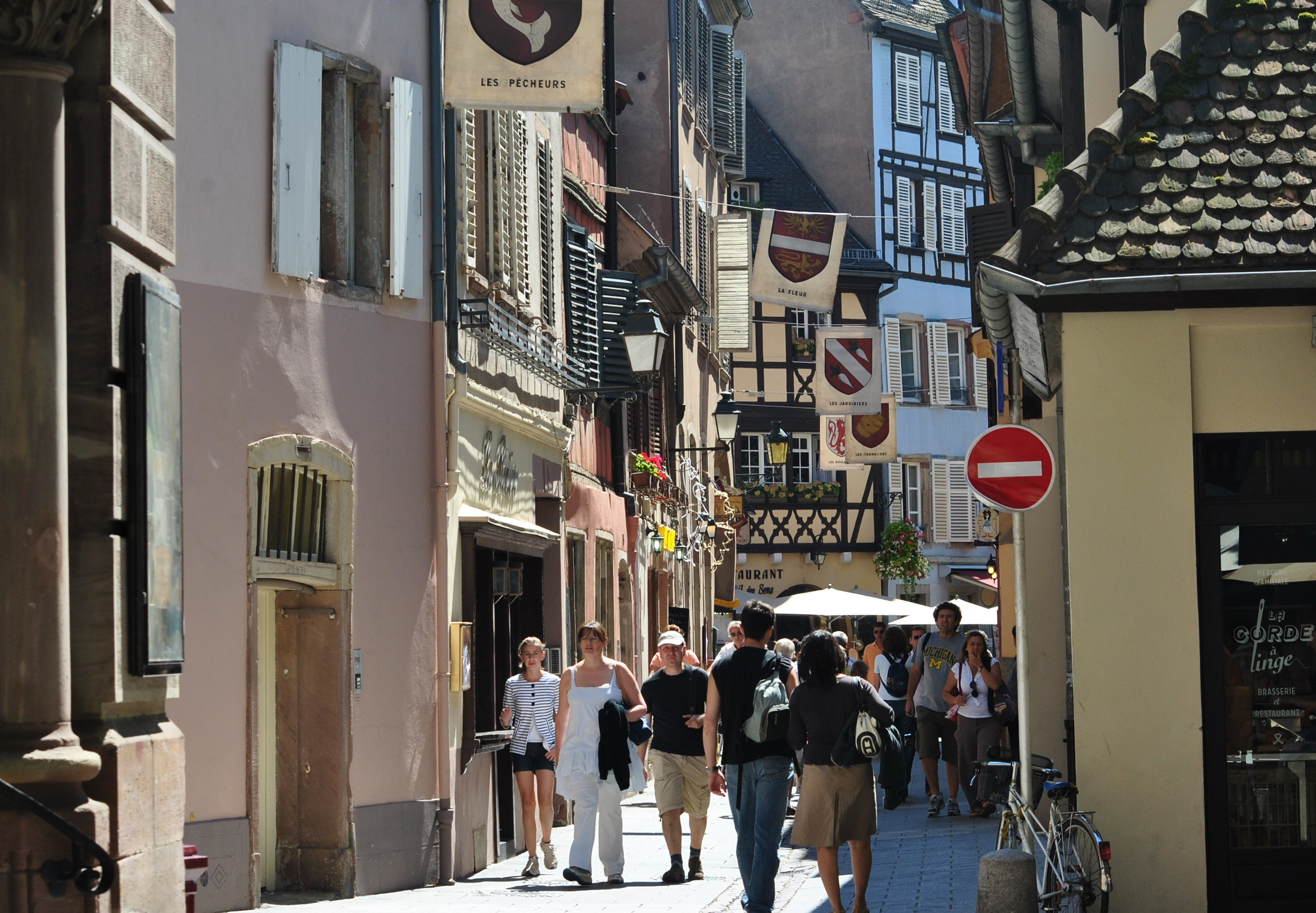
The Rue des Dentelles, one of the quarter's narrow streets

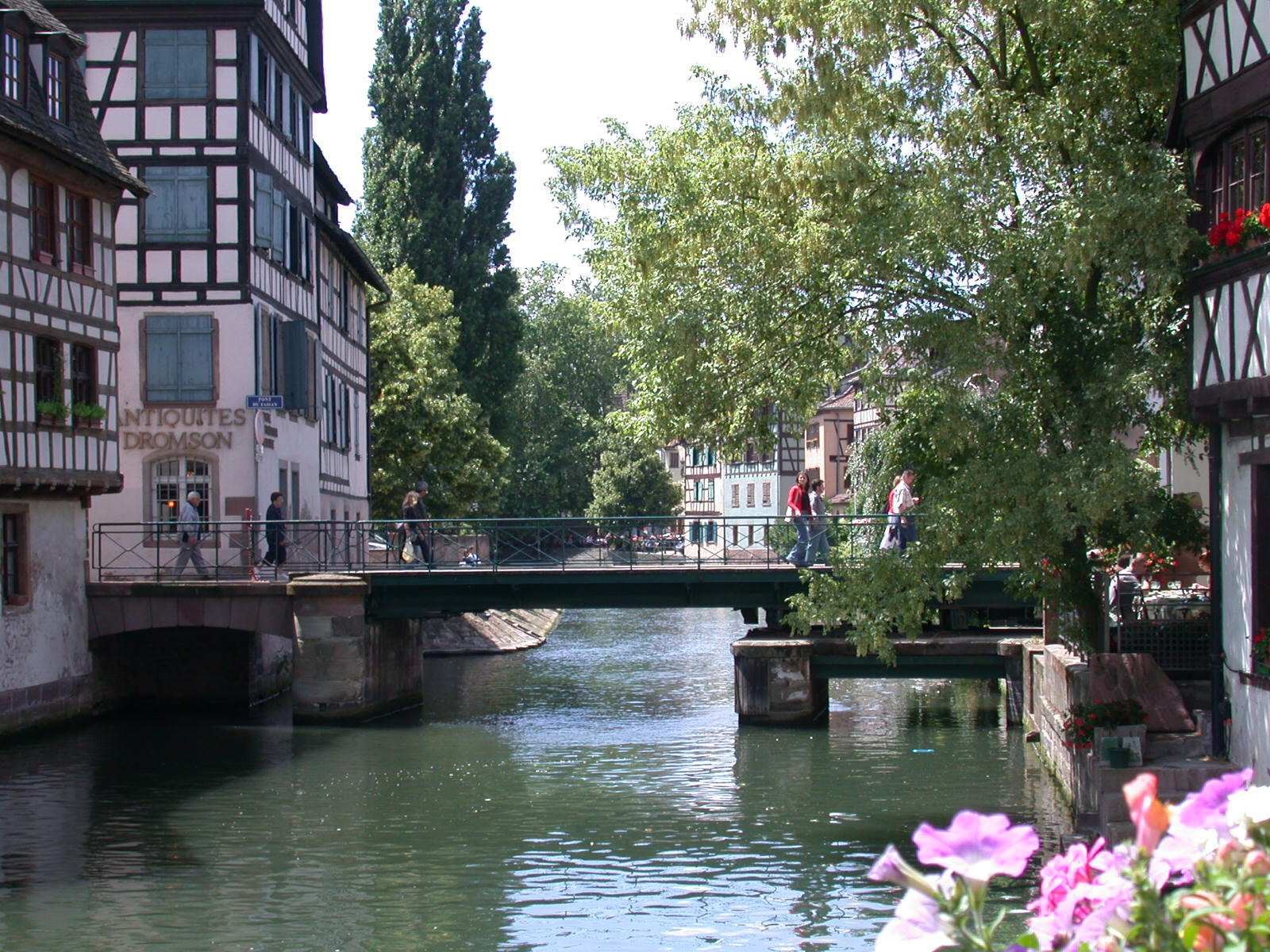
The Pont du Faisan, one of the quarter's bridges
