= Faux-Rempart Canal =

Canal in the French city of Strasbourg

Canal du Faux-Rempart
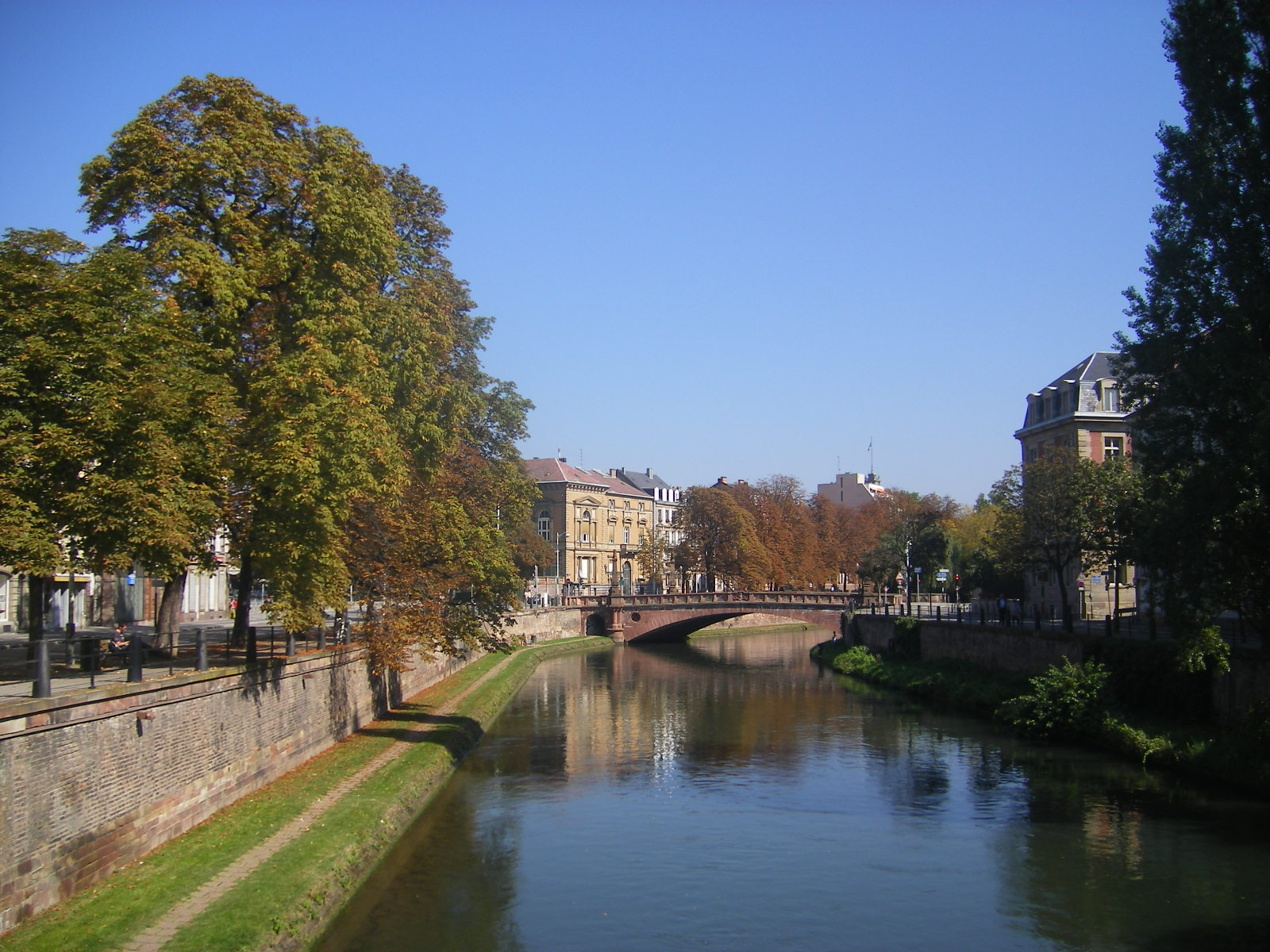
- The Canal du Faux-Rempart and Pont de la Fonderie
- Interactive map of Canal du Faux-Rempart

Specifications
- Length: 2 km (1.2 mi)
- Locks: 1
- Status: Open to trip boats only

History
- Date of first use: 13th century (defense work); 1840 (for navigation)

Geography
- Beginning coordinates: 48.580649°N 7.738251°E
- Ending coordinates: 48.583389°N 7.757156°E
- Connects to: River Ill

The Canal du Faux-Rempart (French pronunciation: [kanal dy fo ʁɑ̃paʁ]), also known as the Fossé du Faux-Rempart ([fose-]), is a canal in the centre of Strasbourg, France. The canal connects at both ends to the River Ill, thus surrounding the Grande Île that lies at the historic centre of the city.

The canal was originally an arm of the River Ill. Initially the bank on the inner, or city, side of the arm was fortified. In the thirteenth century a further wall was built along the middle of the channel. This fortified wall became known as the Faux Rempart or false rampart. Between 1831 and 1832, the mayor Frédéric de Turckheim removed the Faux Rempart in order to "allow a spacious navigation channel and freight transport within the city." In 1840, the canal was opened to navigation.

In its 2-kilometre (1.2 mi) length, the canal is crossed by 13 bridges, and passes through a single lock. Navigation is officially restricted to passenger trip boats only, which operate frequent circular cruises round the Grande Île and through the historic Petite France district of the city.

== Gallery ==
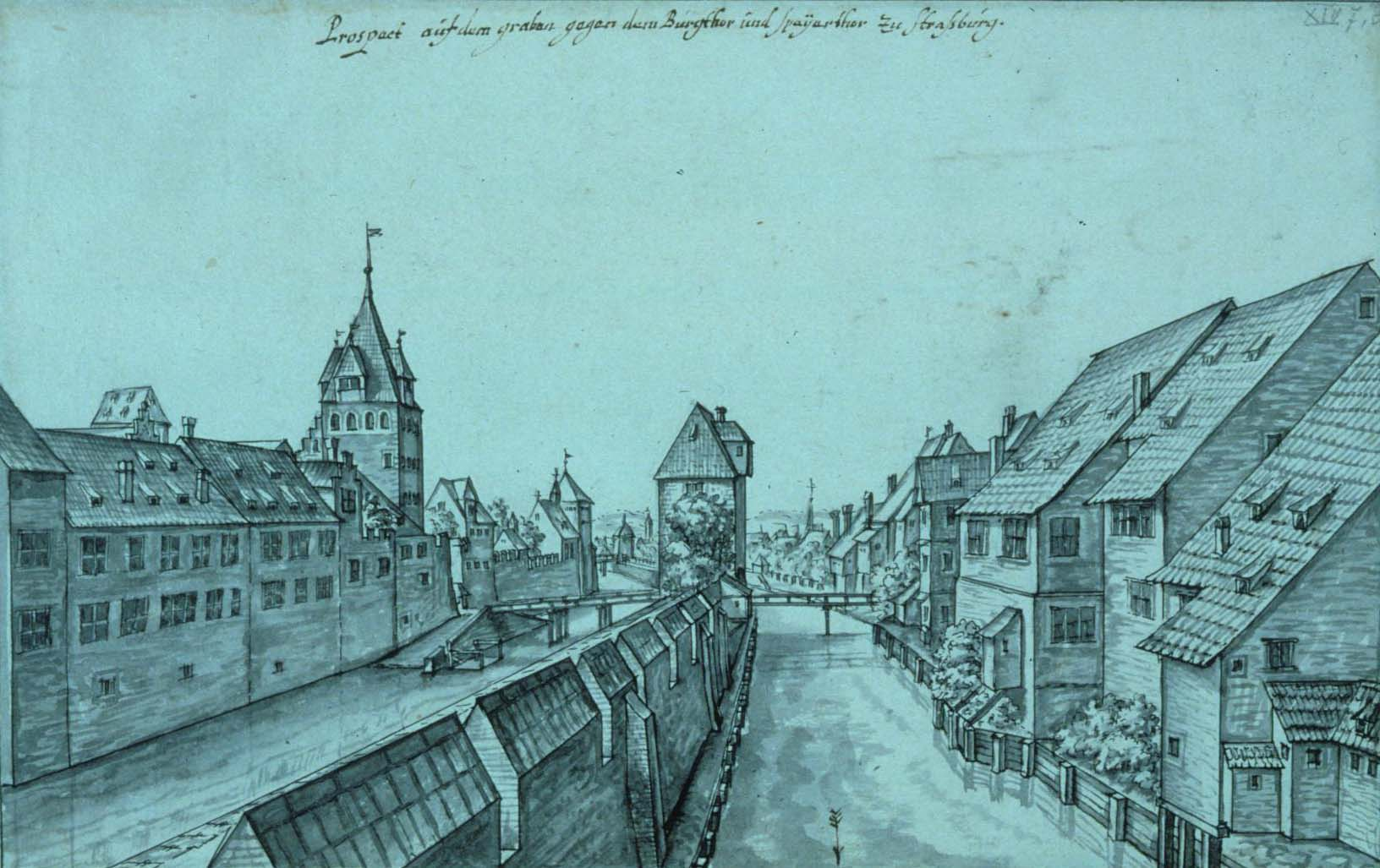
Drawing of the Faux Rempart in 1650

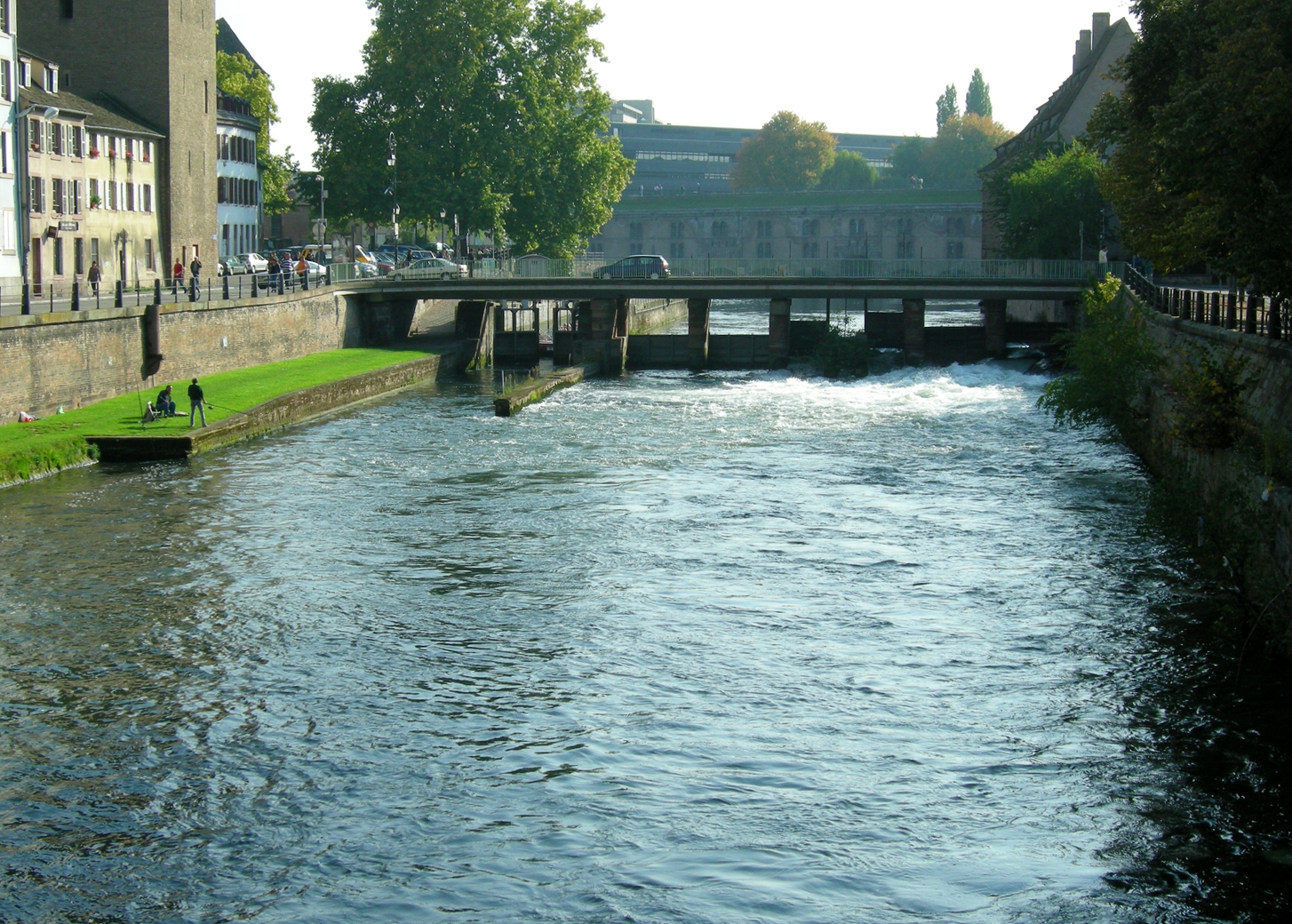
The upstream end of the canal, with the single lock

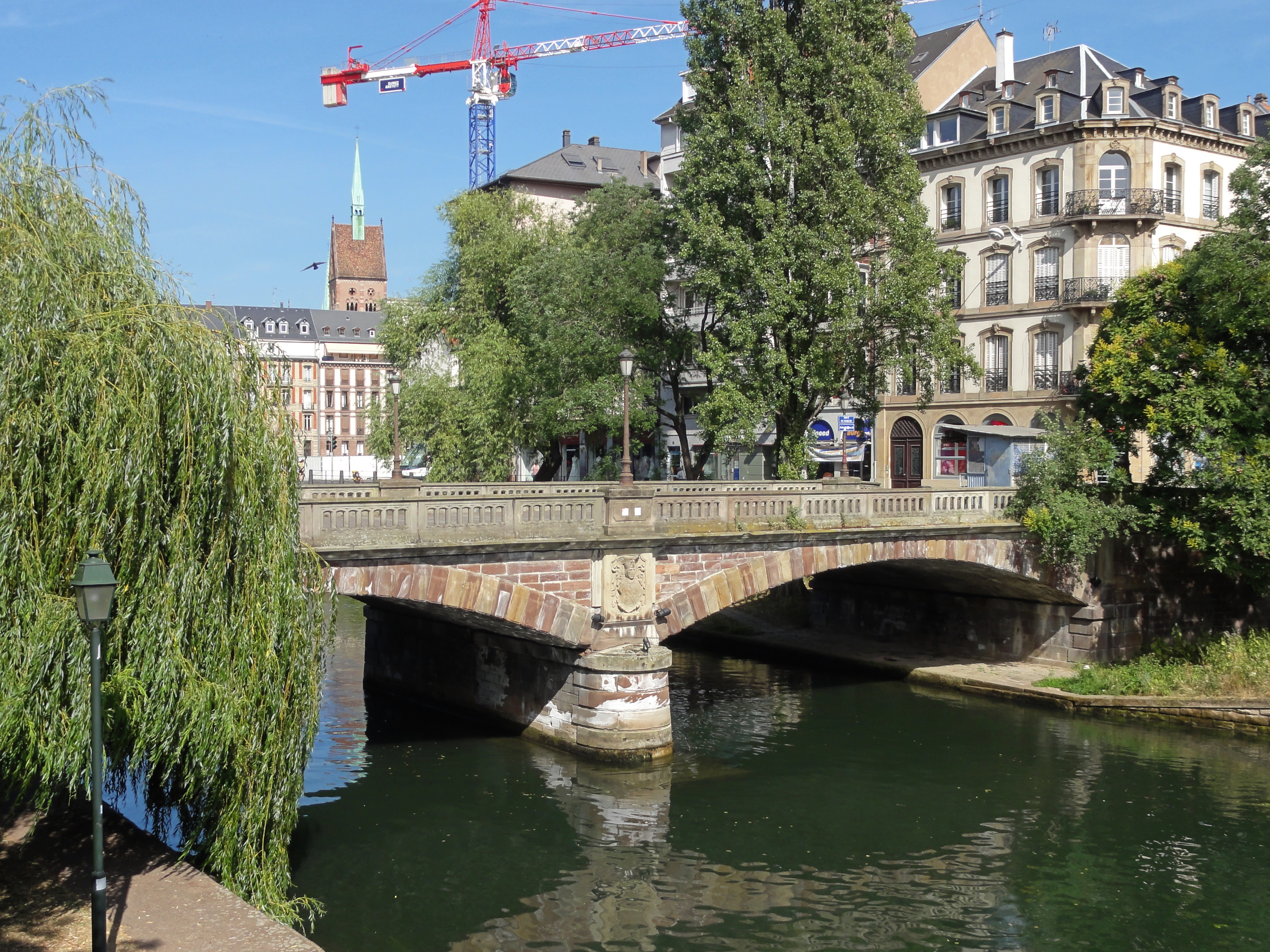
The Pont du Marché

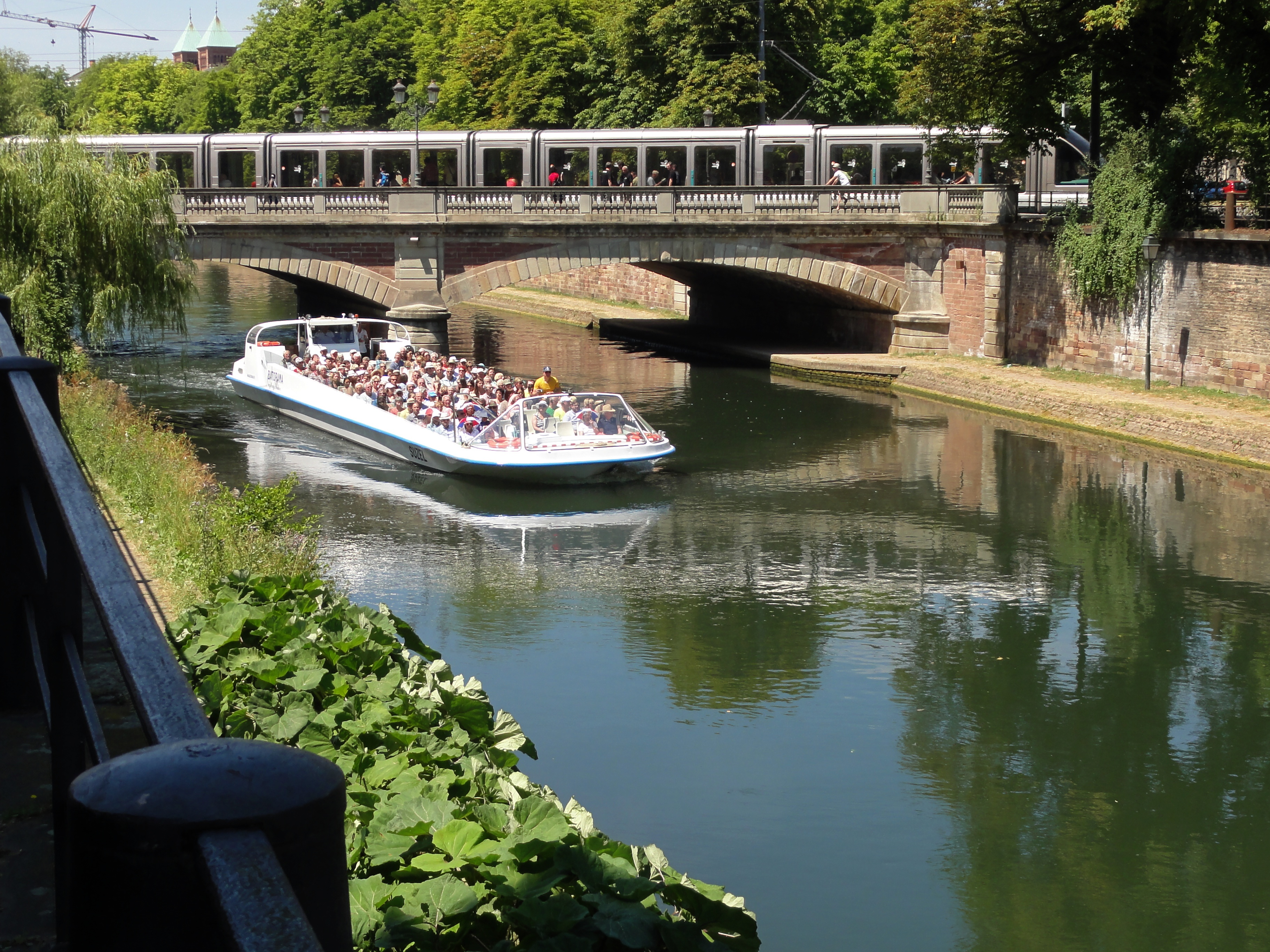
Trip boat at the Pont du Théâtre

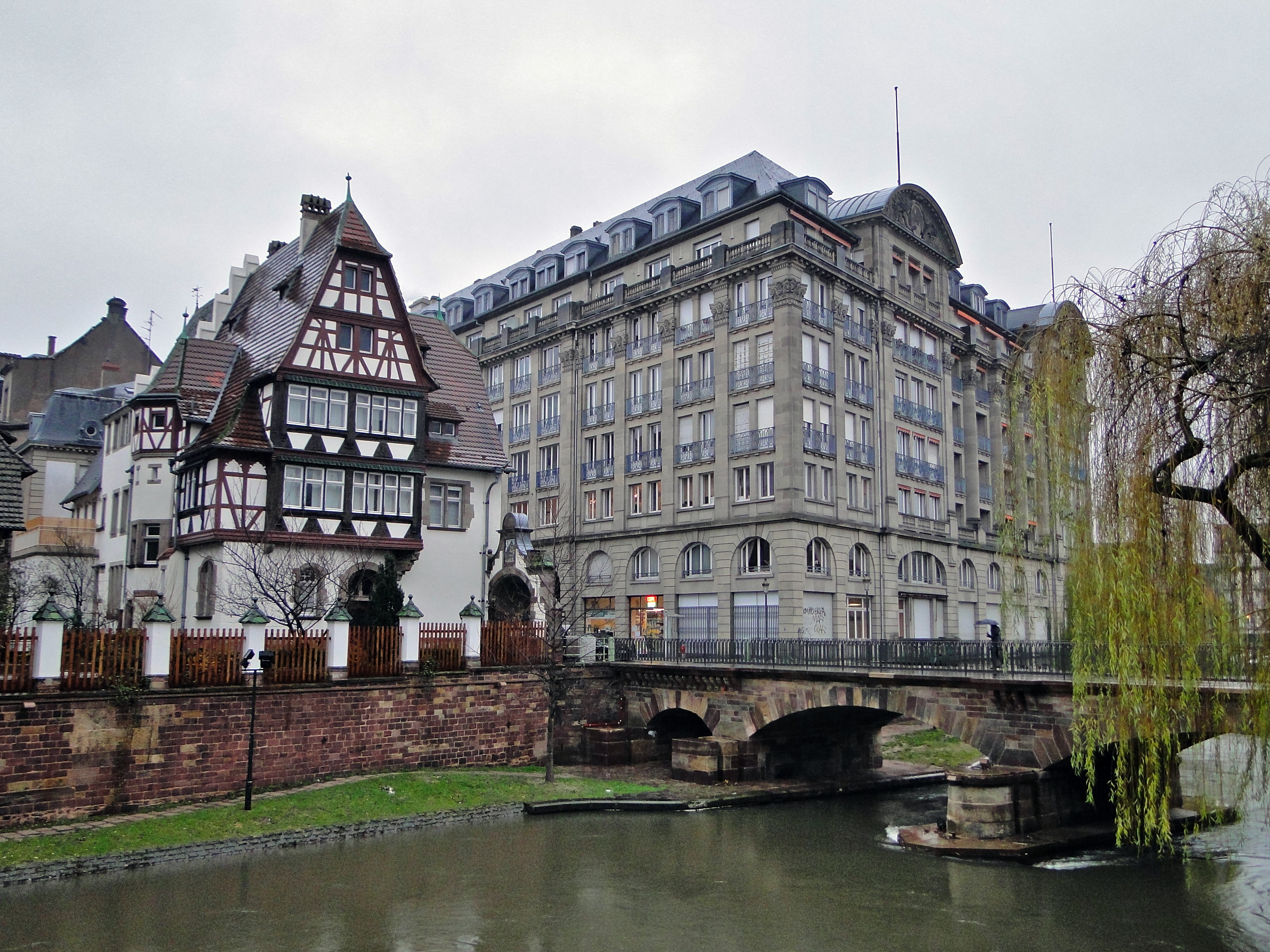
The Pont Saint-Étienne at the downstream end

== See also ==
- List of canals in France
