= Thur (France) =

River in Alsace, France

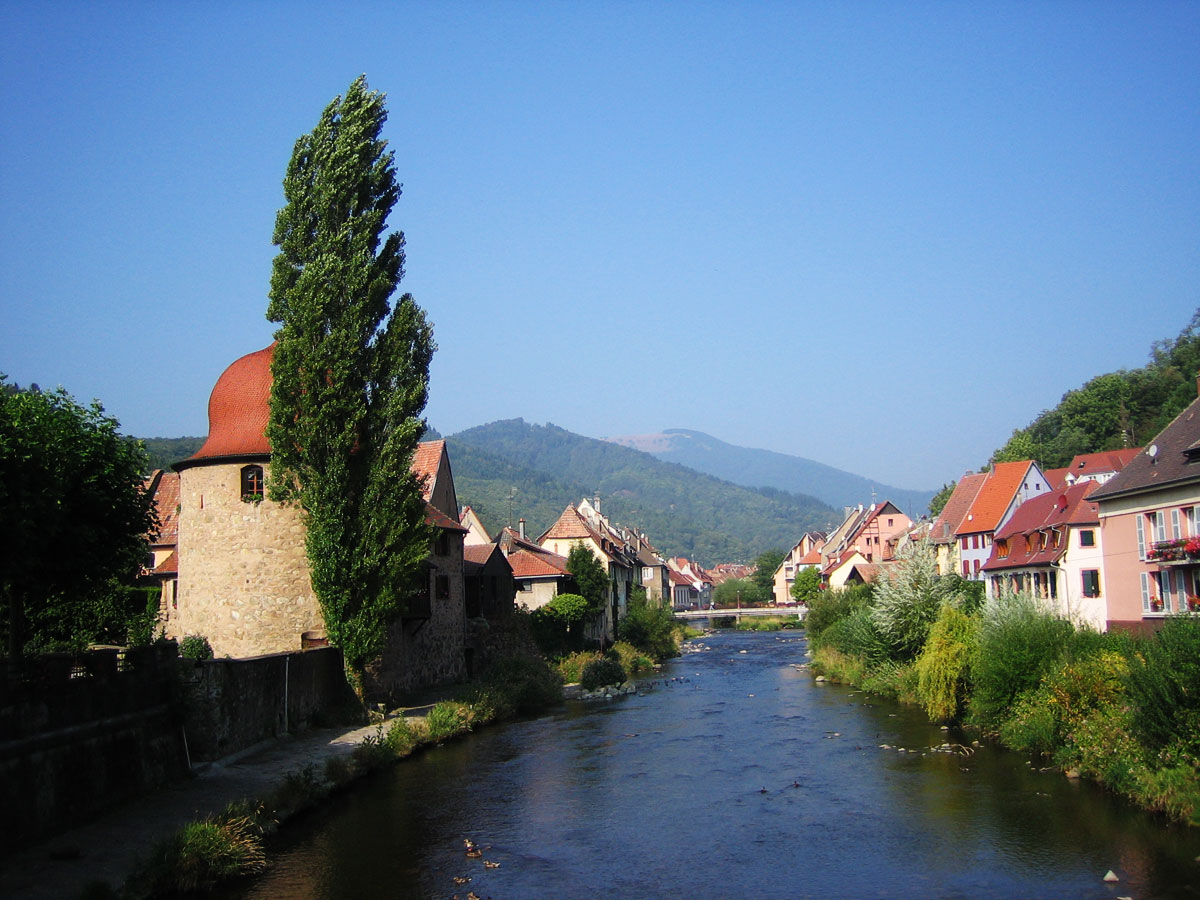
- The Thur in Thann

- Location within France Location within Grand Est

Location
- Country: France
- Department: Haut-Rhin

Physical characteristics
- Source
  - location: Vosges mountains
  - elevation: ±950 m (3,120 ft)
- Mouth
  - location: river Ill
  - coordinates: 47°52′32″N 7°20′34″E
- Length: 53 km (33 mi)
- Basin size: 262 km^{2} (101 mi^{2})
- Discharge
  - average: 5.5 m^{3}/s (190 cu ft/s)

Basin features
- Progression: Ill→ Rhine→ North Sea

The Thur (French pronunciation: [tyʁ]) is a river in the Haut-Rhin department, Alsace, France, left tributary of the river Ill. It rises in the Vosges Mountains, and flows through the towns Thann and Cernay. It flows into the Ill (a tributary of the Rhine) near Ensisheim, north of Mulhouse. It is 53 km (33 mi) long.
