= Winkel, Haut-Rhin =

Commune in Grand Est, France

Winkel
- Commune
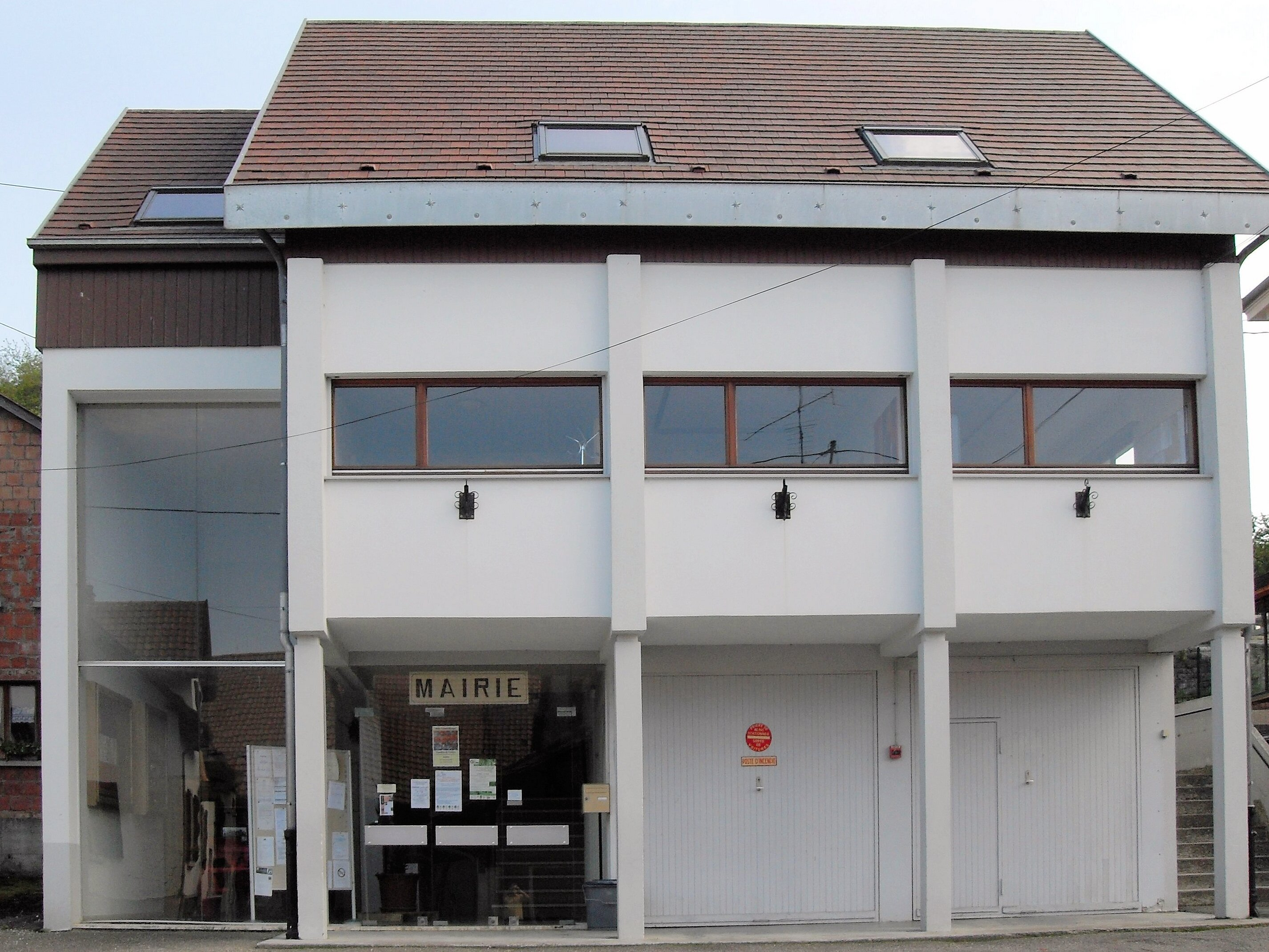
- The town hall in Winkel

- Coat of arms
- Location of Winkel
- Location within France Location within Grand Est
- Coordinates: 47°27′42″N 7°15′51″E
- Country: France
- Region: Grand Est
- Department: Haut-Rhin
- Arrondissement: Altkirch
- Canton: Altkirch
- Intercommunality: Sundgau

Government
  - Mayor (2020–2026): Agnès Lorentz
- Area^{1}: 7.87 km^{2} (3.04 sq mi)
- Elevation: 565 m (1,854 ft)
- Highest elevation: 811 m (2,661 ft)
- Lowest elevation: 520 m (1,710 ft)
- Population (2023): 301
  - Density: 38.2/km^{2} (99.1/sq mi)
- Time zone: UTC+01:00 (CET)
  - Summer (DST): UTC+02:00 (CEST)
- INSEE/Postal code: 68373 /68480
- ^{1} French Land Register data, which excludes lakes, ponds, glaciers > 1 km^{2} (0.386 sq mi or 247 acres) and river estuaries.

Winkel (French pronunciation: [viŋkəl]; Alsatian: Wínkel) is a commune in the Haut-Rhin department in Alsace in north-eastern France.

The river Ill takes its source in the village. Its inhabitants are called Winkelois and Winkeloises.

== Population ==
Historical population
| Year | Pop. | ±% p.a. |
|---|---|---|
| 1968 | 361 | — |
| 1975 | 331 | −1.23% |
| 1982 | 323 | −0.35% |
| 1990 | 331 | +0.31% |
| 1999 | 334 | +0.10% |
| 2007 | 371 | +1.32% |
| 2012 | 331 | −2.26% |
| 2017 | 304 | −1.69% |
| 2023 | 301 | −0.17% |
Source: INSEE

== See also ==
- Communes of the Haut-Rhin department
