= Ill (France) =

River in Alsace, France

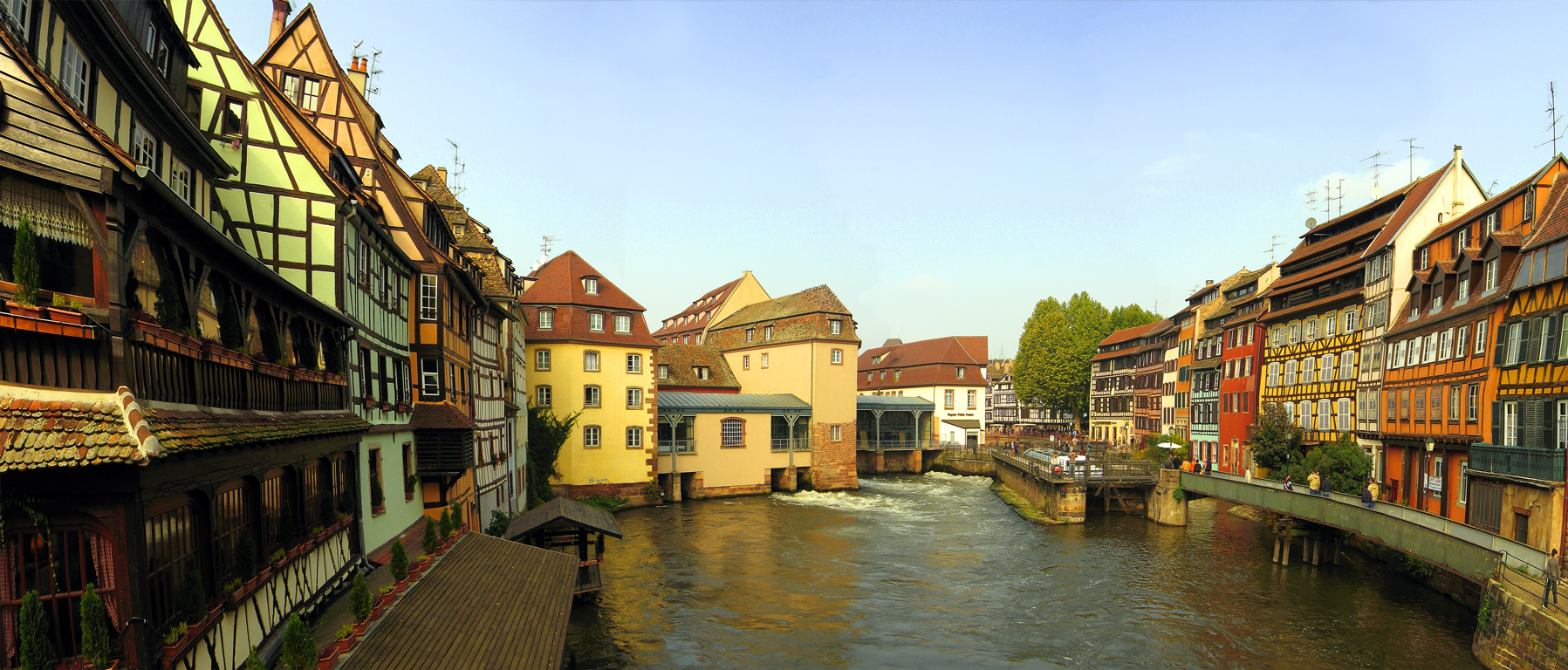
- The Ill in the Petite France quarter of Strasbourg. The river's only lock can be seen right of centre.

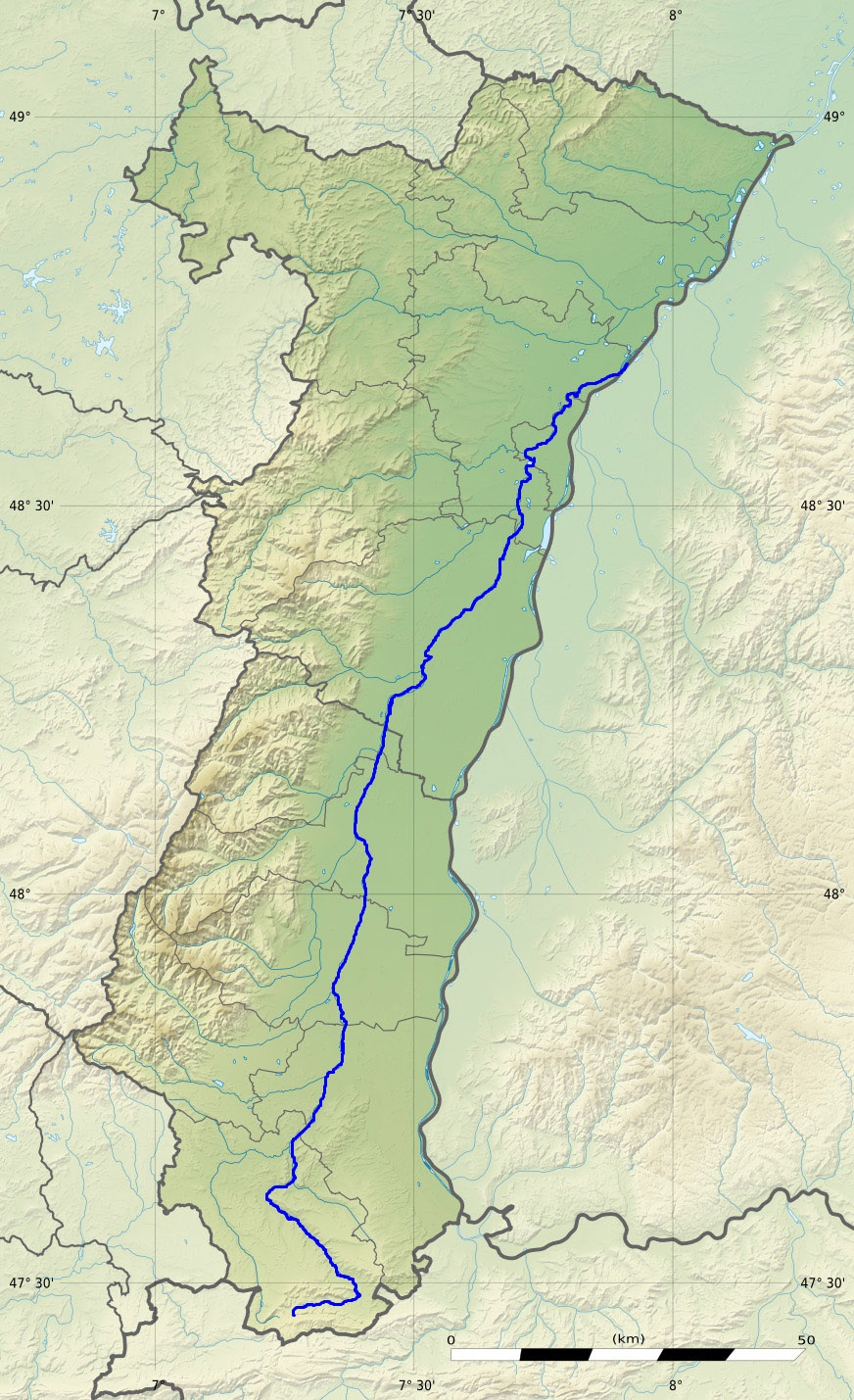

Location
- Country: France
- Region: Grand Est

Physical characteristics
- Source
  - location: Jura Mountains
  - elevation: 570 m (1,870 ft)
- Mouth
  - location: Rhine
  - coordinates: 48°42′1″N 7°55′52″E
- Length: 217 km (135 mi)
- Basin size: 4,760 km^{2} (1,840 mi^{2})

Basin features
- Progression: Rhine→ North Sea
- Tributaries
  - left: Doller, Thur, Fecht, Bruche, Souffel

The Ill at Maison Rouge, near Colmar

The Ill (/ˈɪl/ IL; Alemannic German: [ɪl], French: [il]) is a river in Alsace, in north-eastern France, and a left-bank, or western, tributary of the Rhine. It is 217 km (135 mi) long.

It starts down from its source near the village of Winkel, in the Jura Mountains, with a resurgence near Ligsdorf, turns around Ferrette on its east side, and then runs northward through Alsace, flowing parallel to the Rhine. Taking apart the Largue, also coming from the Jura Mountains near Illfurth, it receives several tributaries from the west bank Vosges mountains after passing through Altkirch: the Doller in Mulhouse, the Thur near Ensisheim, the Lauch in Colmar, the Fecht in Illhaeusern, the Giessen in Sélestat, the Andlau near Fegersheim, the Ehn near Geispolsheim, the Bruche next to Strasbourg and the Souffel upstream from La Wantzenau before meeting with the Rhine downstream from Gambsheim's lock. As the Ill nears the city of Mulhouse, most of its flow is diverted into a discharge channel leading to the Doller, protecting the historical center of the town from floods.

Flowing through the city of Strasbourg, the river forms part of the 17th-century fortifications and passes through a series of locks and channels in the picturesque old town, including the Petite France quarter, where its waters were once used to power mills and tanneries. One of these channels is the Canal du Faux-Rempart that, together with the main channel of the Ill, surrounds the Grande Île or historic centre of Strasbourg.

== Navigation ==
The Ill is currently navigable from a junction with the Canal de la Marne au Rhin for a distance of just under 10 kilometres (6.2 mi) upstream to a head of navigation at Nachtweid. This stretch of river passes through the centre of Strasbourg, and makes connection with the Canal du Faux-Rempart, the Canal du Rhone au Rhine and the, no longer navigable, Canal de la Bruche. There is a single lock, in the Petite France quarter of central Strasbourg.

Navigation through the section of the central part of this section, through Petite France, is restricted to small pleasure craft in the downstream direction only; upstream traffic and commercial traffic must use an indirect route from the Canal de la Marne au Rhin to the Canal du Rhone au Rhine via the Port of Strasbourg. Passenger trip boats use this section in the opposite direction, completing their loop via the Canal du Faux-Rempart that is closed to all other traffic.

Other stretches of the Ill, downstream of the Canal de la Marne au Rhin to the confluence with the Rhine, and upstream of Nachtweid, are not navigable by powered craft, although they may be used by canoes and similar craft.
