= Palais Rohan, Strasbourg =

18th-century palace, home of MBAS, MADS, and MAS

Palais Rohan
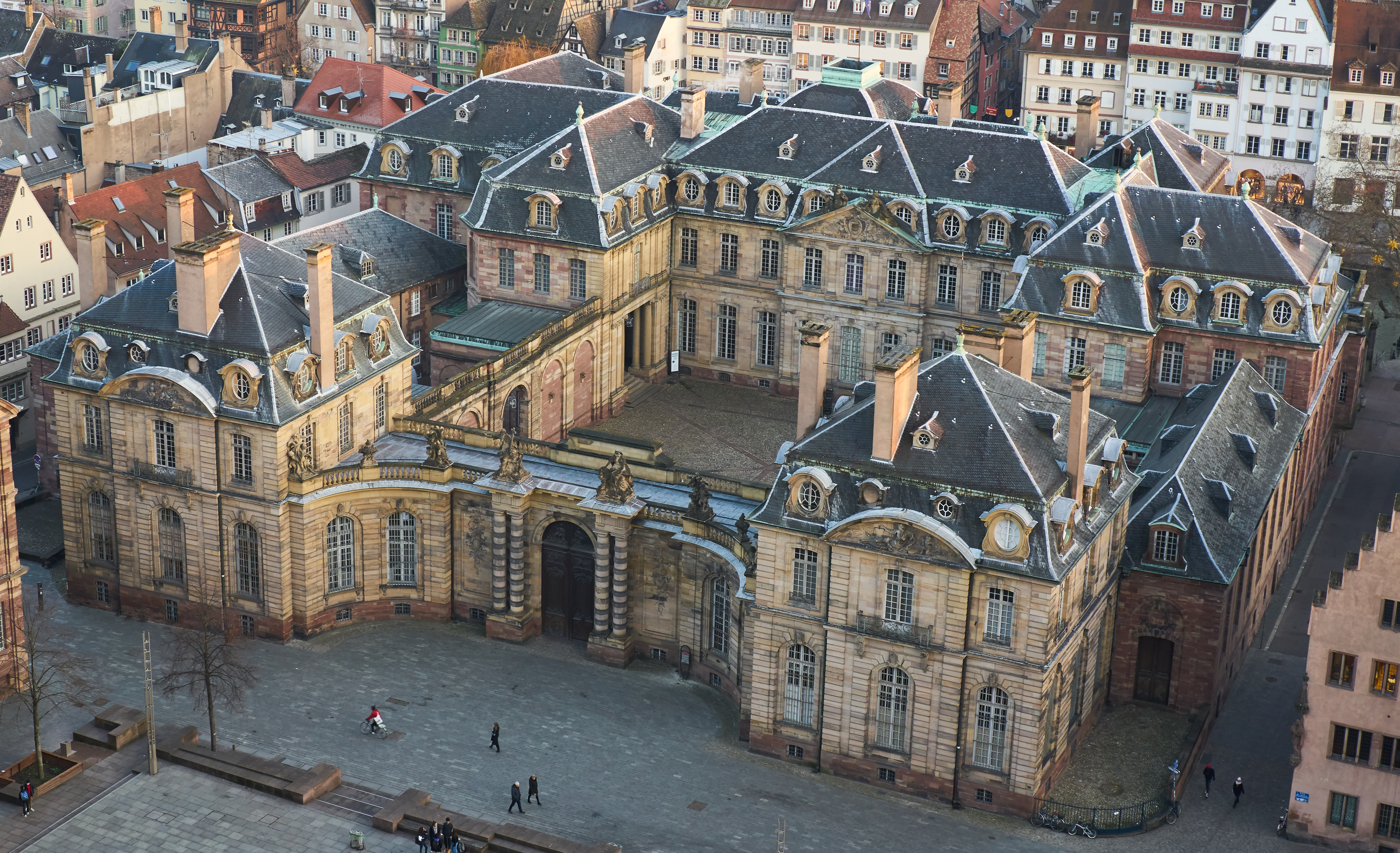
- Aerial view from the Strasbourg Cathedral viewing platform, January 2020

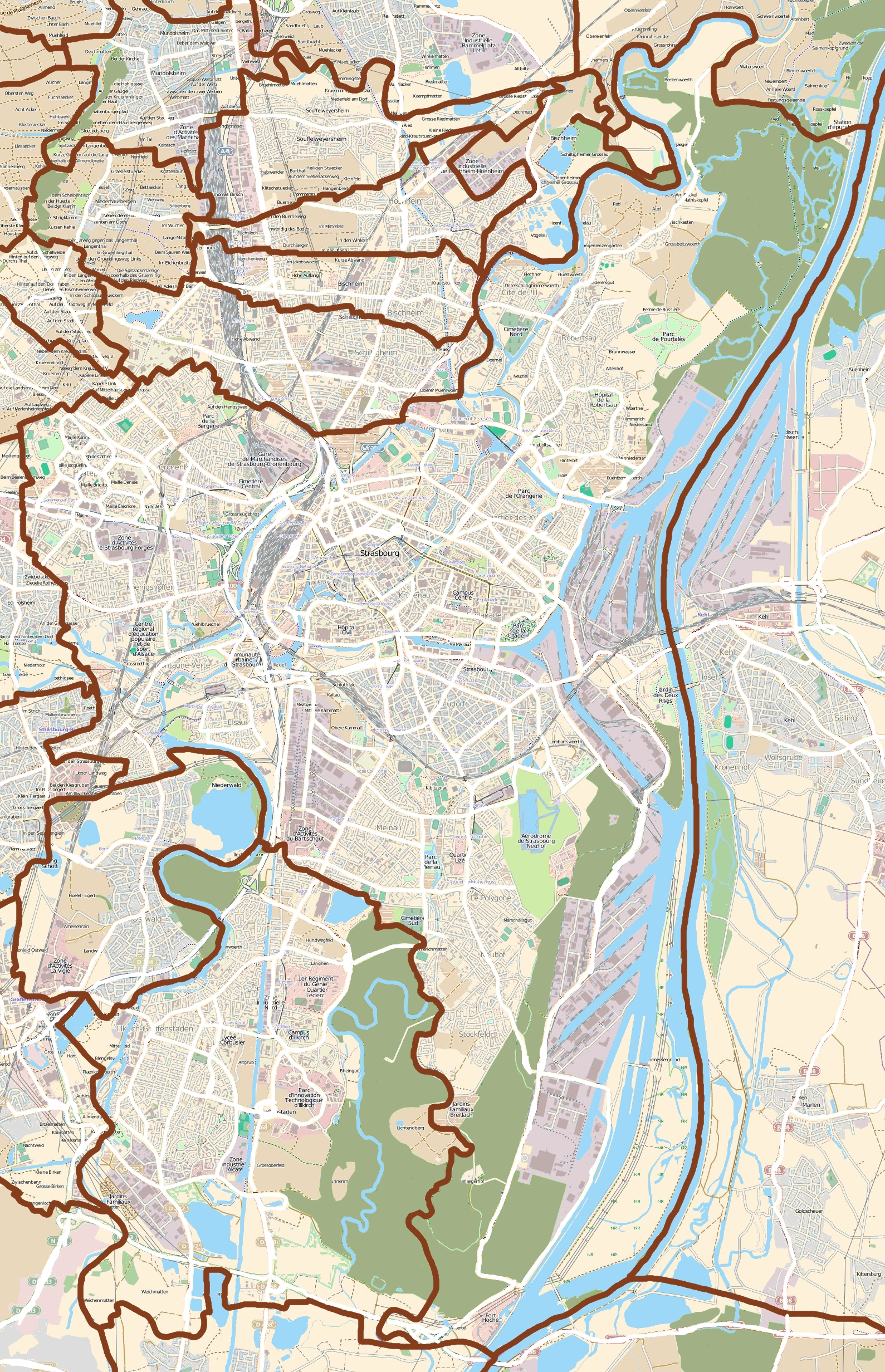
- Location within Strasbourg
- Alternative names: Palais des Rohan, Palais des Rohans

General information
- Type: Palace
- Architectural style: Baroque
- Location: Strasbourg, France, 2, place du Château, 67000 Strasbourg
- Coordinates: 48°34′51″N 7°45′08″E
- Current tenants: Archaeological Museum, Museum of Fine Arts, Museum of Decorative Arts
- Construction started: 1732
- Completed: 1742
- Owner: Municipality of Strasbourg

Design and construction
- Architects: Robert de Cotte, Joseph Massol

Website
- www.musees.strasbourg.eu/index.php?page=le-palais-rohan-en

The Palais Rohan (Rohan Palace) in Strasbourg is the former residence of the prince-bishops and cardinals of the House of Rohan, an ancient French noble family originally from Brittany. It is a major architectural, historical, and cultural landmark in the city. It was built next to Strasbourg Cathedral in the 1730s, from designs by Robert de Cotte, and is considered a masterpiece of French Baroque architecture. Since its completion in 1742, the palace has hosted a number of French monarchs such as Louis XV, Marie Antoinette, Napoleon and Joséphine, and Charles X.

Reflecting the history of Strasbourg and of France, the palace has been owned successively by the nobility, the municipality, the monarchy, the state, the university, and the municipality again. Its architectural conception and its iconography were intended to indicate the return of Roman Catholicism to the city, which had been dominated by Protestantism for the previous two centuries. Thus the prelate's apartments face the cathedral, to the north, and many of the statues, reliefs and paintings reflect Catholic dogma.

Since the end of the 19th century the palace has been home to three of Strasbourg's most important museums: the Archaeological Museum (Musée archéologique, basement), the Museum of Decorative Arts (Musée des Arts décoratifs, ground floor) and the Museum of Fine Arts (Musée des Beaux-Arts, first and second floor). The municipal art gallery, Galerie Robert Heitz, in a lateral wing of the palace, is used for temporary exhibitions. The Palais Rohan has been listed since 1920 as a monument historique by the French Ministry of Culture.

== History ==
=== Up to 1871 ===
In 1727, Armand Gaston Maximilien de Rohan, bishop of Strasbourg since 1704 and cardinal since 1712, commissioned the architect Robert de Cotte to design the palace; de Cotte provided initial plans the same year. Seven years prior, in 1720, Cardinal de Rohan had already charged de Cotte with renovation and embellishment works on his castle in Saverne, the predecessor of the current Rohan Castle. De Cotte had also previously designed the Hôtel du grand Doyenné, the first hôtel particulier in Louis XV style built in Strasbourg. The Palais Rohan was built on the site of the former residence of the bishop, the "bishop's demesne", (Note: German: bischöflicher Fronhof, shortened to Bischofshof, "bishop's court", also known as "bishop's palace" (German: bischöfliche Pfalz).) which is recorded since at least 1262. The area itself is near the heart of the ancient Argentoratum, first mentioned in 12 BC. Diverse archaeological excavations on the Place du Château, the square facing the palace, have unearthed many remains of the Roman camp.

Building work on the Palais Rohan took place from 1732 until 1742 under the supervision of the municipal architect Joseph Massol, who also worked on the Hôtel de Hanau and the Hôtel de Klinglin during the early years of the project. Massol was assisted by the architects Laurent Gourlade and Étienne Le Chevalier. The sculptures, including statues as well as reliefs, were provided by Robert Le Lorrain, assisted by Johann August Nahl, Gaspard Pollet, and Laurent Leprince, and the paintings by Pierre Ignace Parrocel and Robert de Séry. The ébéniste Bernard Kocke and the ironworkers and locksmiths Jean-François Agon and his son Antoine Agon worked on the furnishings of the apartments, while the stucco was the work of the Italians Castelli and Morsegno. A budget of 344,000 French livres had been established for the construction – 200,000 livres lent from the Cathedral chapter (Grand Chapitre) and 144,000 raised as local taxes over a period of twelve years – but the final cost is estimated at one million French livres. The palace is mostly built in yellow sandstone from Wasselonne, with pink sandstone for the less visible parts.

The House of Rohan owned (Note: The residence of the bishop belonged to the Roman Catholic diocese of Strasbourg, but due to the reforms Louis XIV forced on Alsace in 1687, the diocese became the property of selected French nobility. Thus Armand Gaston became landgrave of Lower Alsace and prince of the Holy Roman Empire as soon as he was created prince-bishop of Strasbourg.) the palace until the French Revolution, when it was confiscated, declared bien national ("state owned"), and finally auctioned off on 8 August 1791. Bought by the municipality, it became the new town hall (hôtel de ville) the same year, succeeding the Neubau. Much of the furniture and many of the works of art in the Palais were sold, and in 1793 the eight life-sized mural portraits of prince-bishops decorating the Salle des évêques (Bishops' Hall) were destroyed. They were replaced in 1796 by allegories of civic virtues painted by Joseph Melling. Only the portrait of Armand Gaston, the builder of the palace, was later restored to its original place with a 1982 replica of Hyacinthe Rigaud's lost painting. (Note: Although Rigaud's original had been destroyed, contemporaneous copies have survived such as the one kept in the Palace of Versailles.) Melling also replaced the overdoor portraits of kings of France, decorating the same room with paintings of vases.

The Palais Rohan remained the hôtel de ville until 1805. That year, the municipality presented it to Napoleon, who returned the Hôtel de Hanau in exchange. Like the palace, the hôtel had been state-owned since the Revolution. The 1805 arrangement proved favourable for the municipality: the maintenance of the Hôtel de Hanau was less costly than that of the larger Palais Rohan. It pleased Napoleon, for whom the palace was the more conspicuous display of grandeur. As for the palace, imperial ownership meant renewed splendour. The present to Napoleon was officially accepted by decree on 21 January 1806; the interiors were then refurbished by the architect Pierre-François-Léonard Fontaine. In the years before the Franco-Prussian War and the return of Alsace to Germany, the Palais Rohan was the property of the French state, which was in turn an empire, a kingdom, a monarchy, a republic, and again an empire.

=== Since 1871 ===
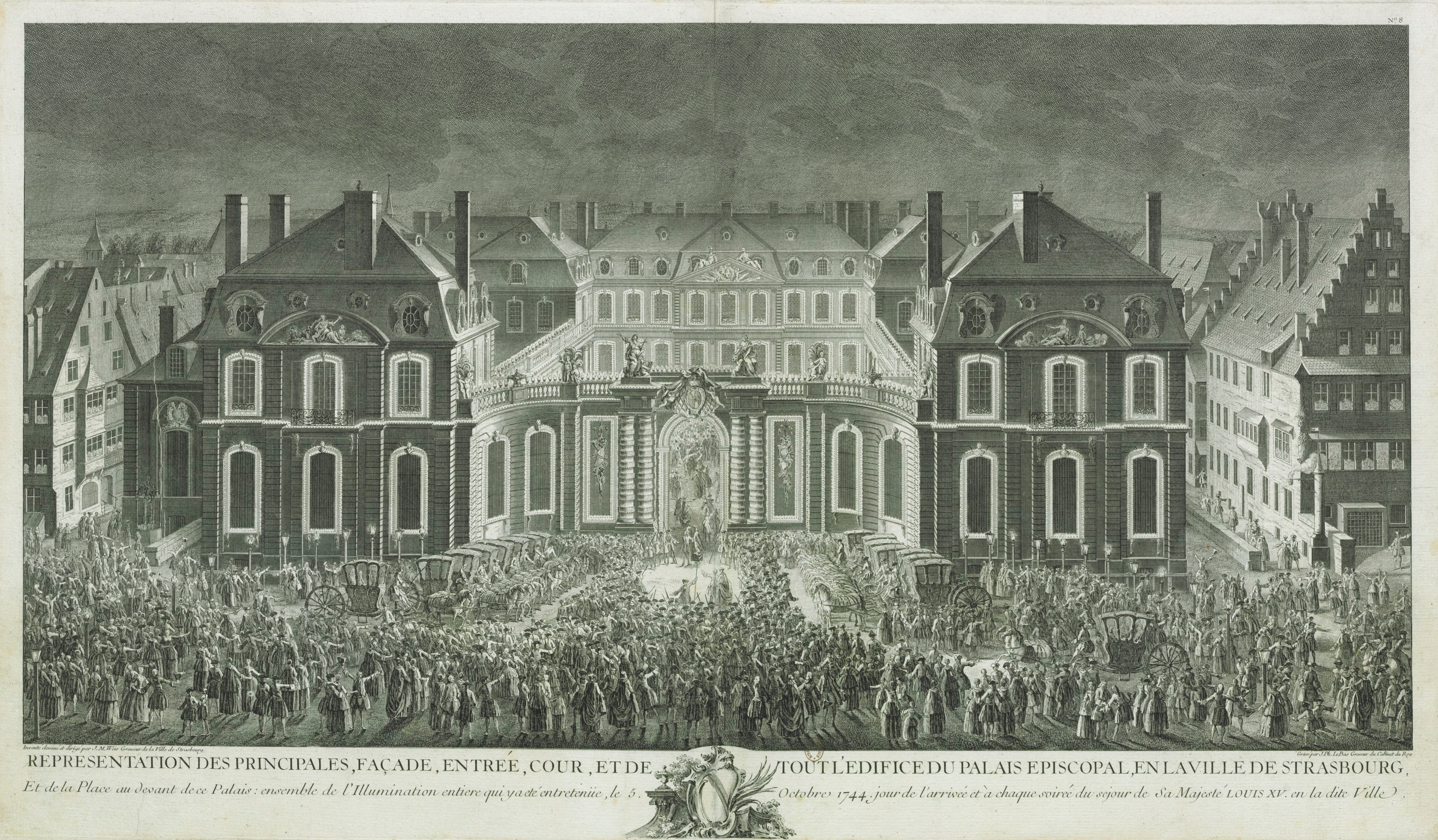
The palace on 5 October 1744, during a visit of King Louis XV of France

The year 1871 signified the end of French rule and the beginning of German rule over Alsace, which had until 1681 been linked to Germany through the Holy Roman Empire. Having lost the Franco-Prussian War, France had to cede the departments of Bas-Rhin, Haut-Rhin, and Moselle (the territory also known as Alsace-Lorraine, or Elsass-Lothringen in German) to the newly created German Empire. Now under new administration and having lost its residential purpose, the Palais Rohan had to be assigned a new role. Between 1872 and 1884, until the opening of the Palais universitaire, it was used by the newly established Kaiser-Wilhelms-Universität, the Imperial German version of the University of Strasbourg, as the seat of the faculties of law, philosophy, and sciences. The palace then served as the university's library until the opening of the National and University Library in 1895. After this, the palace again became the property of the city and was adapted to receive the municipal art collections that were being built up again by director Wilhelm von Bode after their total destruction during the Siege of Strasbourg (see below, Musée des Beaux-Arts). The first section of the new Kunstmuseum der Stadt Strassburg, established in 1898, was inaugurated in 1899.

After the return of Alsace to French rule in 1918, the new director of the Musée des Beaux-Arts and the Musée des Arts décoratifs, Hans Haug (1890–1965), put major efforts into presenting the Palais Rohan as a coherent whole again. Strasbourg suffered during World War II, and on 11 August 1944 the palace was damaged by British and American bombs. After the war, restoration measures were soon undertaken under the supervision of the architects Robert Danis (1879–1949) and Bertrand Monnet (1910–1989), but in 1947 a fire broke out and devastated a significant part of the collections of the Museum of Fine Arts. This fire was an indirect consequence of the bombing raids: because of the destruction inflicted on the palace, the building had suffered from damp, which was treated with welding torches, and poor handling of these caused the fire.

Rebuilding and refurbishing the palace took until well into the 1950s, with full restoration not completed until the 1990s. In 1989 a large trompe-l'œil fresco depicting the Roman goddess Ceres was rediscovered behind layers of plaster and white paint in the former dining hall, the eastern wing of the Synod Hall (see below, Apartments). It is thought to have been concealed under Napoleonic ownership, and had been forgotten since.

=== Notable guests ===
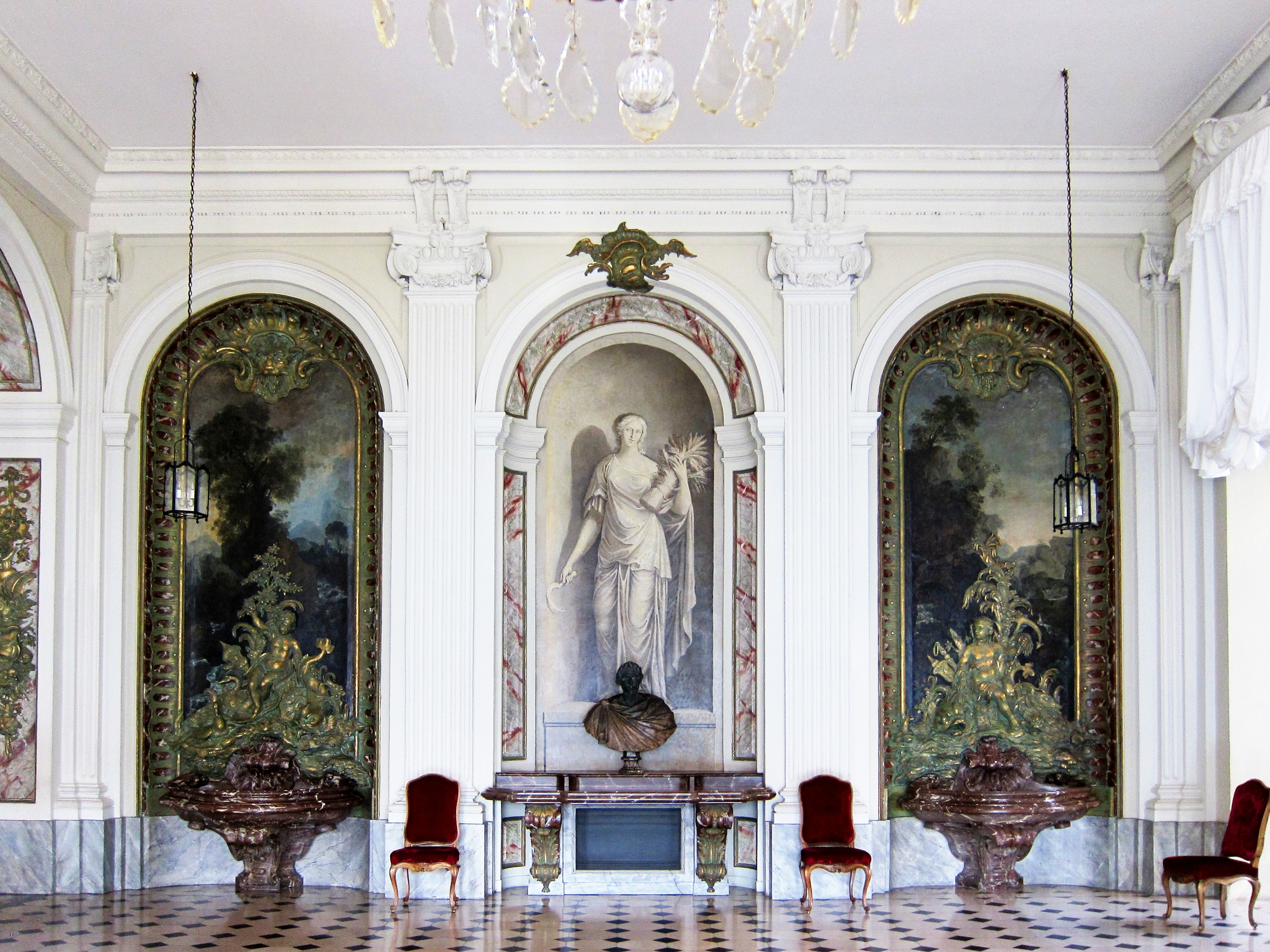
Fresco depicting Ceres, rediscovered in 1989

King Louis XV stayed in the palace from 5 to 10 October 1744. Maria Josepha of Saxony, Dauphine of France, spent two nights in the palace from 27 to 29 January 1747. Queen Marie Antoinette spent her first night on French soil there on 7 to 8 May 1770. In 1805, 1806, and 1809 Emperor Napoleon spent several nights in the palace; his wife, Empress Josephine stayed for longer periods, from September 1805 until January 1806 (Battle of Austerlitz), and from May until July 1809 (Battles of Aspern-Essling and of Battle of Wagram).

Napoleon's second wife, Empress Marie Louise, spent her first nights on French soil in the palace, from 22 to 25 March 1810; she came from Austria like Marie-Antoinette. Other royal French guests were Charles X, on 7 and 8 September 1828, (Note: The website of the Musées de Strasbourg erroneously writes "1829".) and Louis Philippe I from 18 to 21 June 1831.

In the early 20th century, the sculptor Ringel d′Illzach used one of the rooms of the palace as an atelier. After World War II, the first great art exhibition in the palace, "L'Alsace française 1648–1948", was inaugurated on 13 June 1948 by Jean de Lattre de Tassigny, one of the chief artisans of the Liberation of Alsace (1944–45).

On 8 May 1985, U.S. President Ronald Reagan dined in the Palace and signed the official Strasbourg guestbook, on the occasion of his visit to the European Parliament. In December 1989, the Palais Rohan hosted the dinner parties of the heads of state of the European Council, including François Mitterrand, Helmut Kohl, Margaret Thatcher, Giulio Andreotti and Felipe González. Twenty years later, before the 2009 Strasbourg–Kehl summit, it was the site of a meeting between French President Nicolas Sarkozy and his American counterpart Barack Obama as well as their wives Carla Bruni and Michelle Obama. In the 21st century, the palace was the setting for the official dinner for the 2016 Fed Cup finalists, the gala dinners for the 20th and the 25th anniversary of Eurimages, as well as other festive receptions, since it can be booked for such occasions from the municipality.

== Structure ==
The palace is structured around a large and paved courtyard. It has a trapezoidal plan, and the land falls away toward the river Ill. To compensate for the slope, the riverside (southern) façade of the main wing has four floors (including the Mansard roof), while the courtyard (northern) façade has three floors. The half-buried floor corresponds to the basement and now houses the archaeological museum (see below, Museums). The riverside façade is thus both the highest and the widest of the palace. The terrace before it, facing the Quai des Bateliers, is closed at both ends by elaborate wrought-iron gates adorned with the coat of arms of the House of Rohan.

The riverside façade is formed by the main residential bulk and the library wing on the west side, which offers a contrast in shape and design, notably through its single, very large window. The main part of the façade is symmetrically arranged around an avant-corps of four columns with Corinthian capitals. The avant-corps is crowned with a voluminous triangular pediment, again adorned with the coat of arms of the House of Rohan, while the library wing is crowned with a semicircular pediment. That pediment was originally surmounted by two copper statues of angels, now lost. The library wing was not part of the original 1727 plan but was conceived in 1733, after the cardinal bought up and demolished a row of houses on the current Rue de Rohan. The architect, Robert de Cotte, was thus able to distribute the interior spaces of the residential bulk on an even grander and also more practical plan, notably putting the main staircase to the left (east) of the apartment wing instead of the centre.

The courtyard façade of the main wing, in the same classical style as its counterpart facing the Ill, is narrower. A strong emphasis is put on the verticality of the windows, by which means the impression of height is accentuated. Again, a central avant-corps is crowned with a triangular pediment bearing reliefs and in this case also statues. Both façades are richly decorated with allegorical mascarons (depicting seasons, temperaments, continents and elements), eighteen in all on the riverside façade and nine in all on the courtyard façade, to which the riverside façade adds a pair of broad wrought-iron balconies. Due to the difference in width and the trapezoidal plan, the centres of the façades are not aligned.

The courtyard is divided in three sections separated by a row of arches. The left section (as seen from the cathedral) belongs to the Communs wing, which housed the servants. The right section belongs to the stables wing. Left and right of the façade are exedras decorated with busts of Roman emperors. The entrance to the palace is through the left exedra. Facing the courtyard façade is a peristyle with five arches. The central arch, the highest and widest, faces the centre of the façade and opens on the palace's main gate.

The front of the palace on the Place du Château (called the Place de l'Évêché between 1740 and 1793), designed in a more Baroque style than the rest of the palace, is wide and curved. The central gate is framed by two pairs of columns and juts out in the shape of a triumphal arch. The upper part of the front section is crowned with statues representing allegories of faith such as "Religion" and "Eucharist", and personifications of Christian virtues such as "Mercy" and "Penance". Plaster casts of some of these statues are displayed in the lapidarium inside the Barrage Vauban. The wooden portal (oak) and the walls east and west of the gate are decorated with trophies and heraldic symbols relating to the House of Rohan and the episcopal polity. The two pavilions connecting the Communs and the stable wings with the gate section are decorated with sixteen mascarons representing male and female Old Testament prophets, and with crescent-shaped pediments, in contrast to the triangular pediments of the façades. The east (left) pavilion housed the palace's kitchens while the west (right) pavilion housed the offices of the ecclesiastical court.

=== Exterior views ===
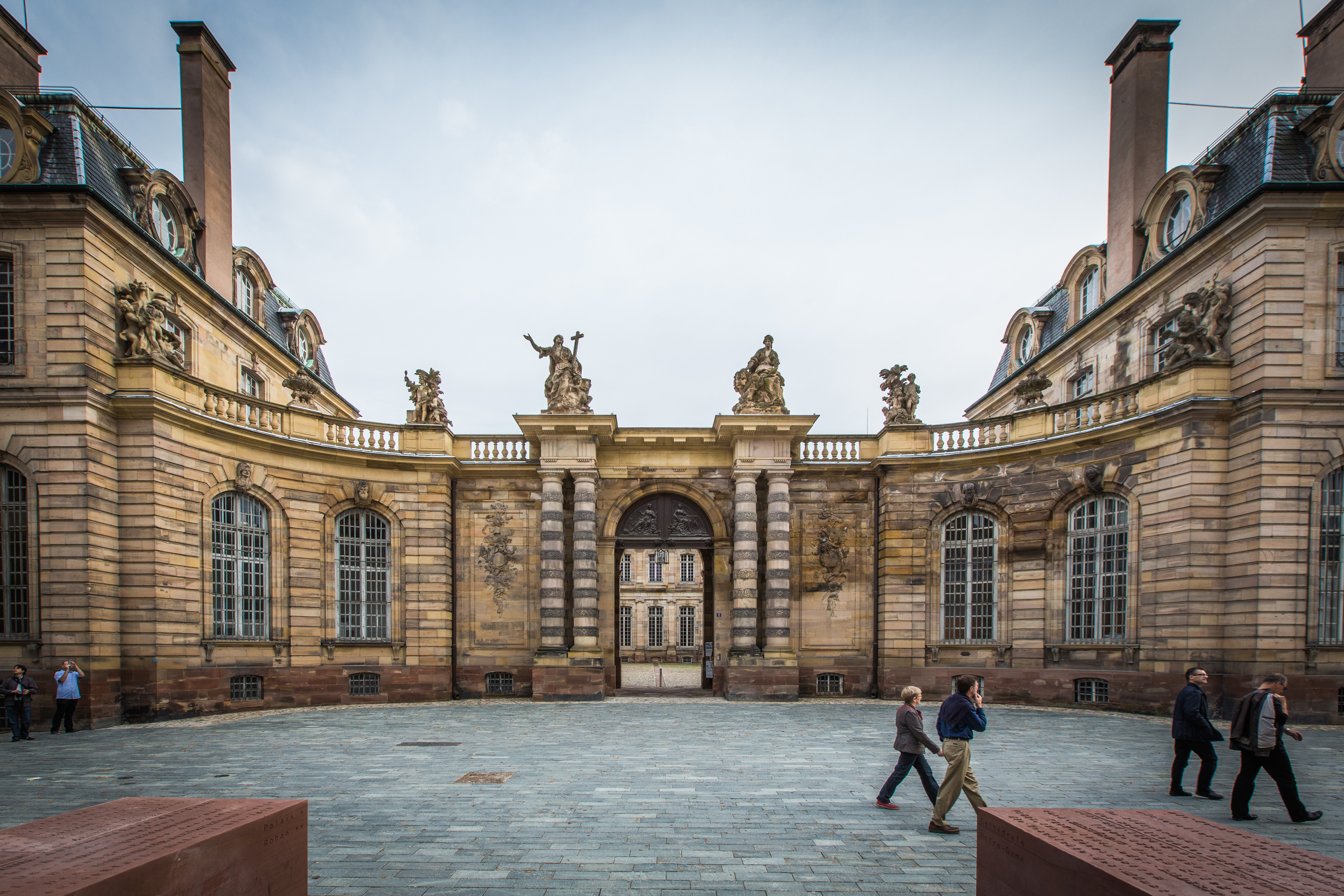
Entrance of the palace

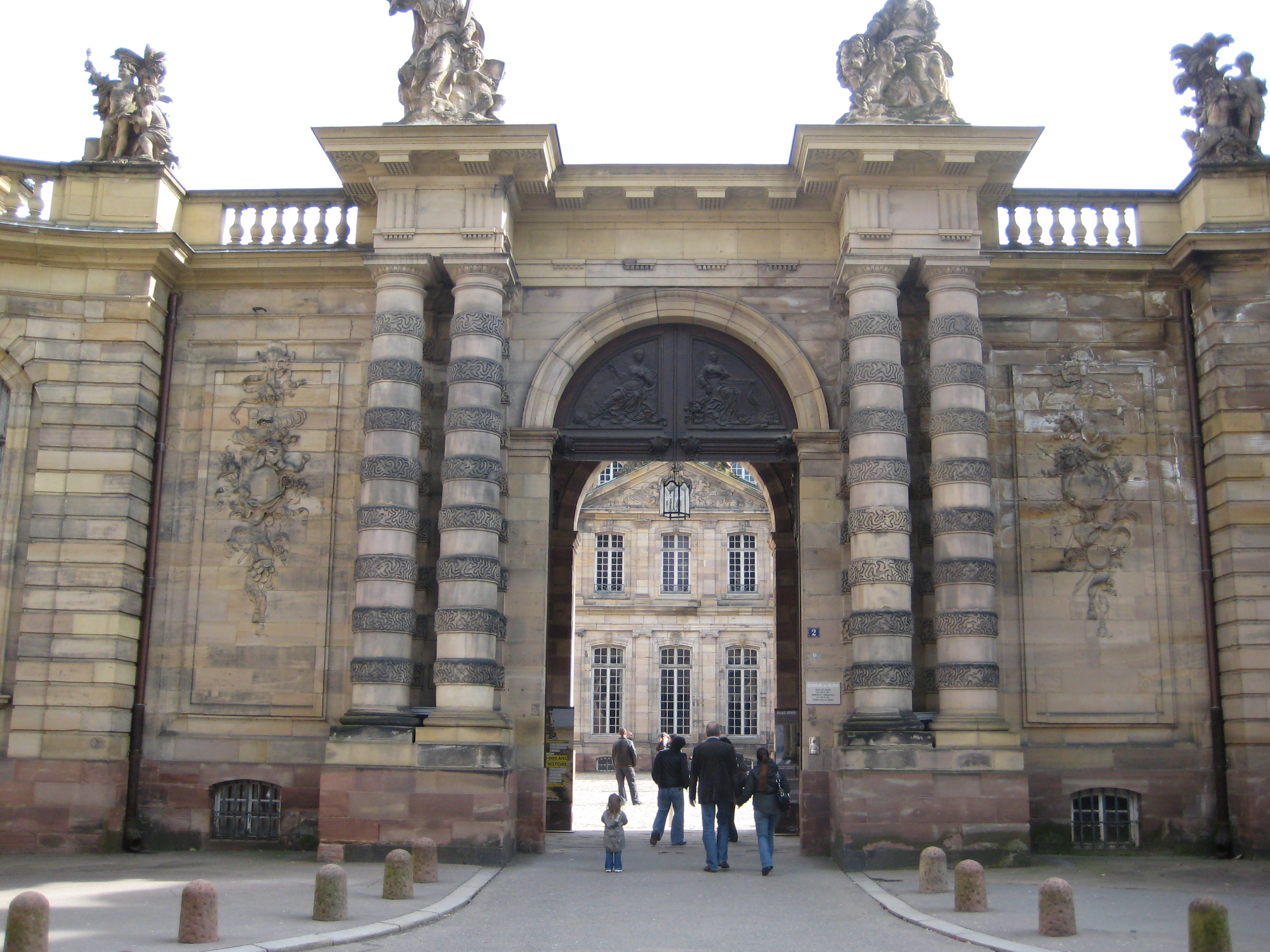
The main portal

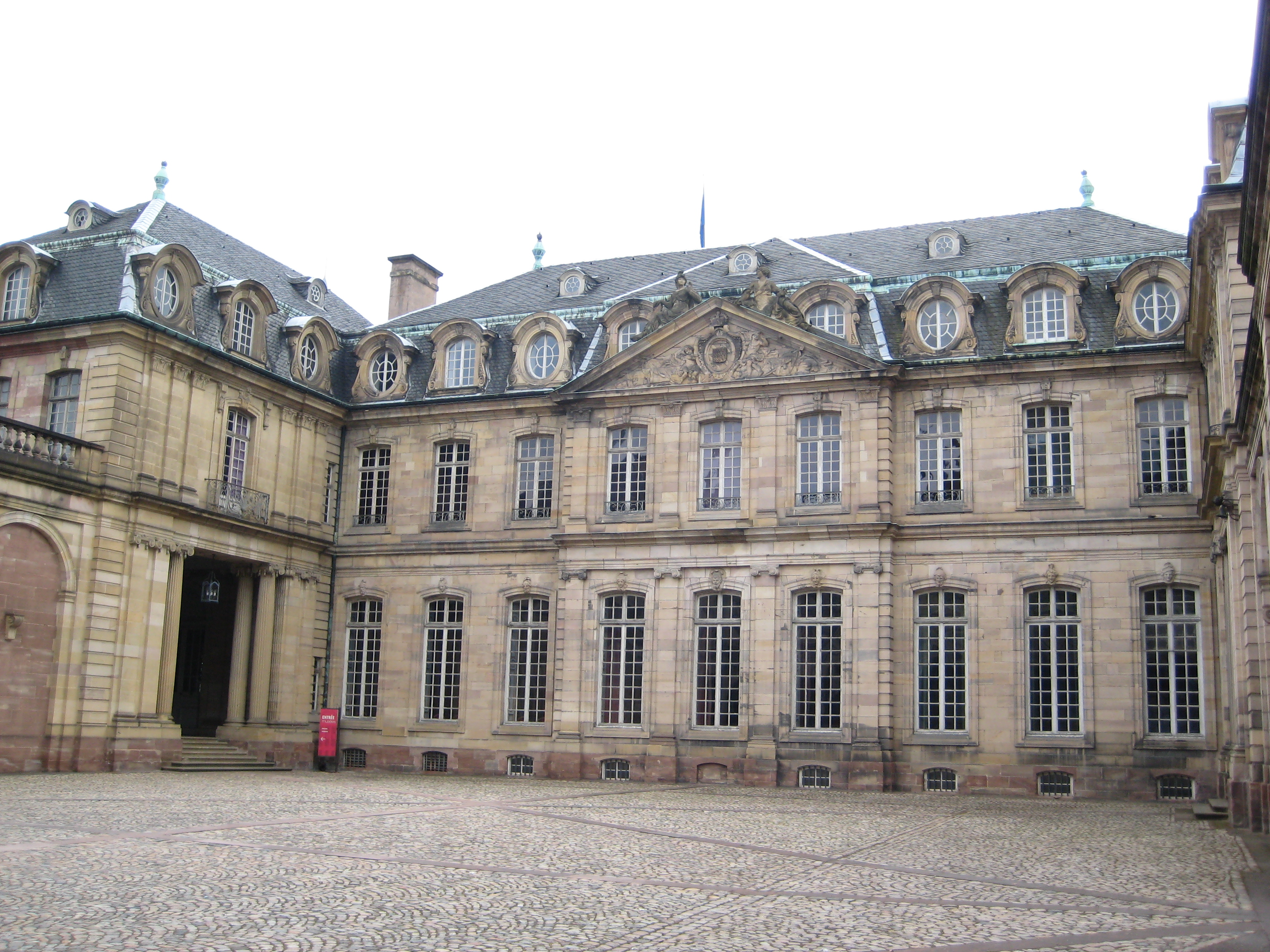
Façade facing the inner courtyard

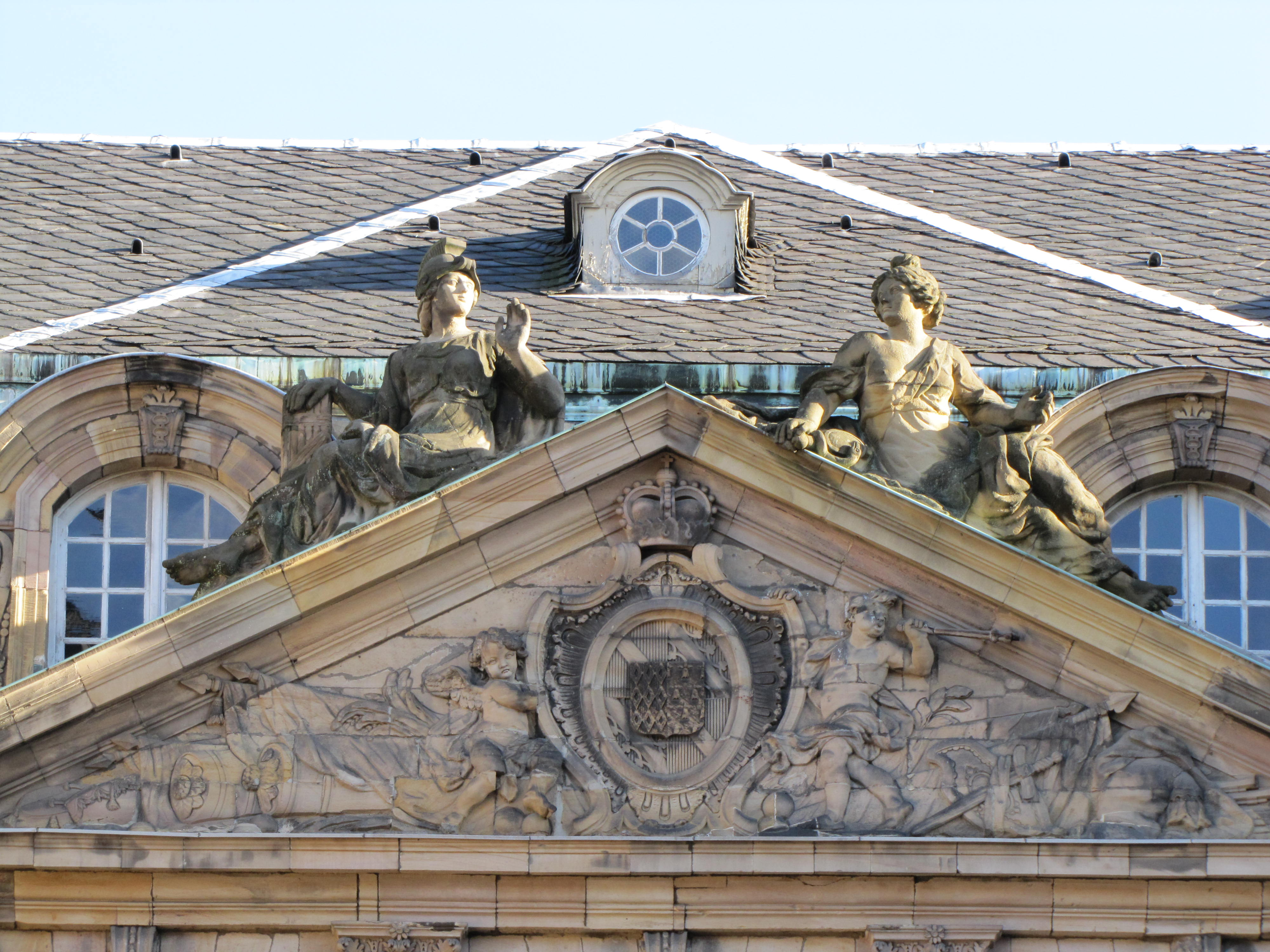
Pediment with coat of arms of the courtyard façade

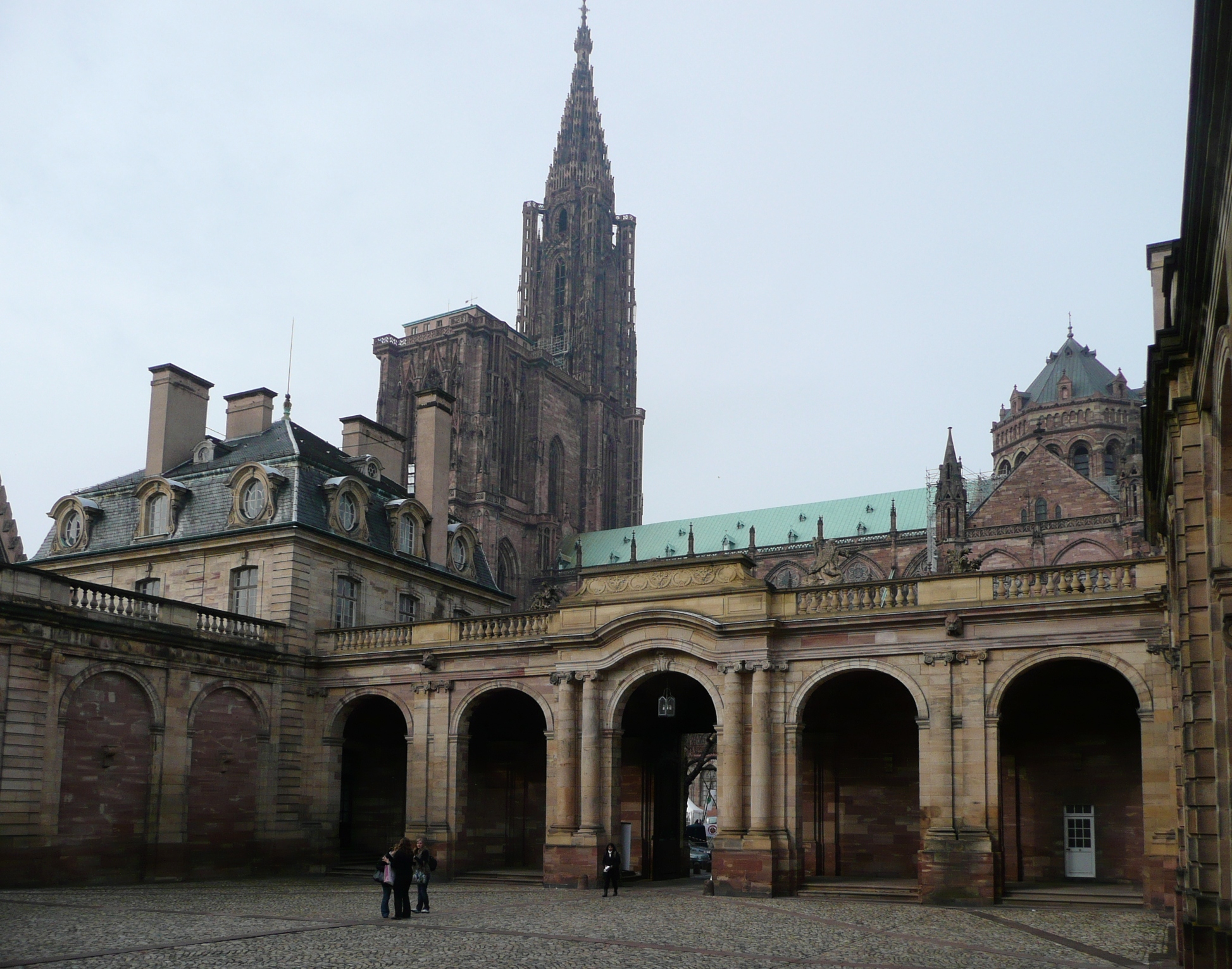
View from the main courtyard towards the entrance and the Cathedral

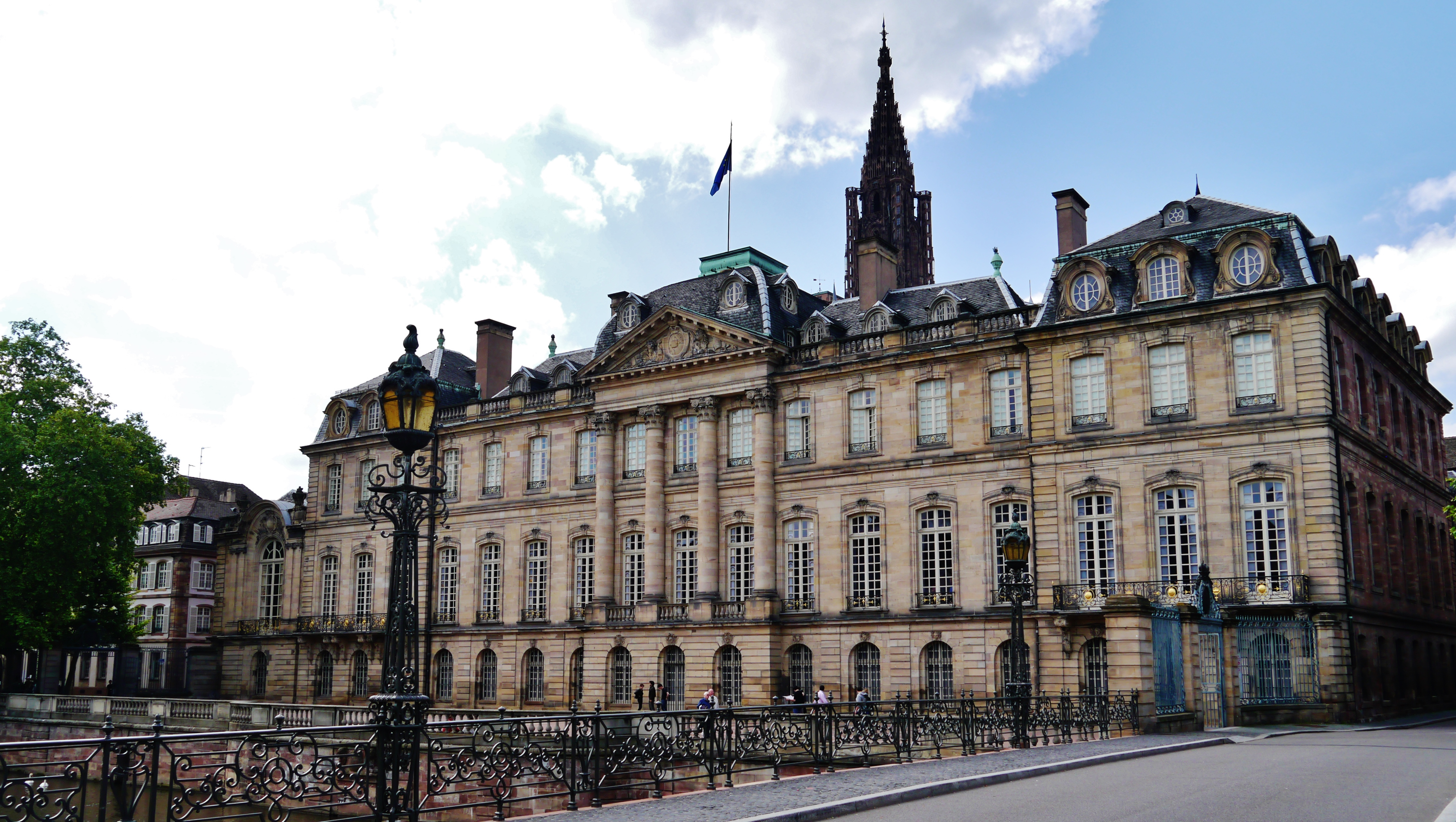
Façade facing the river

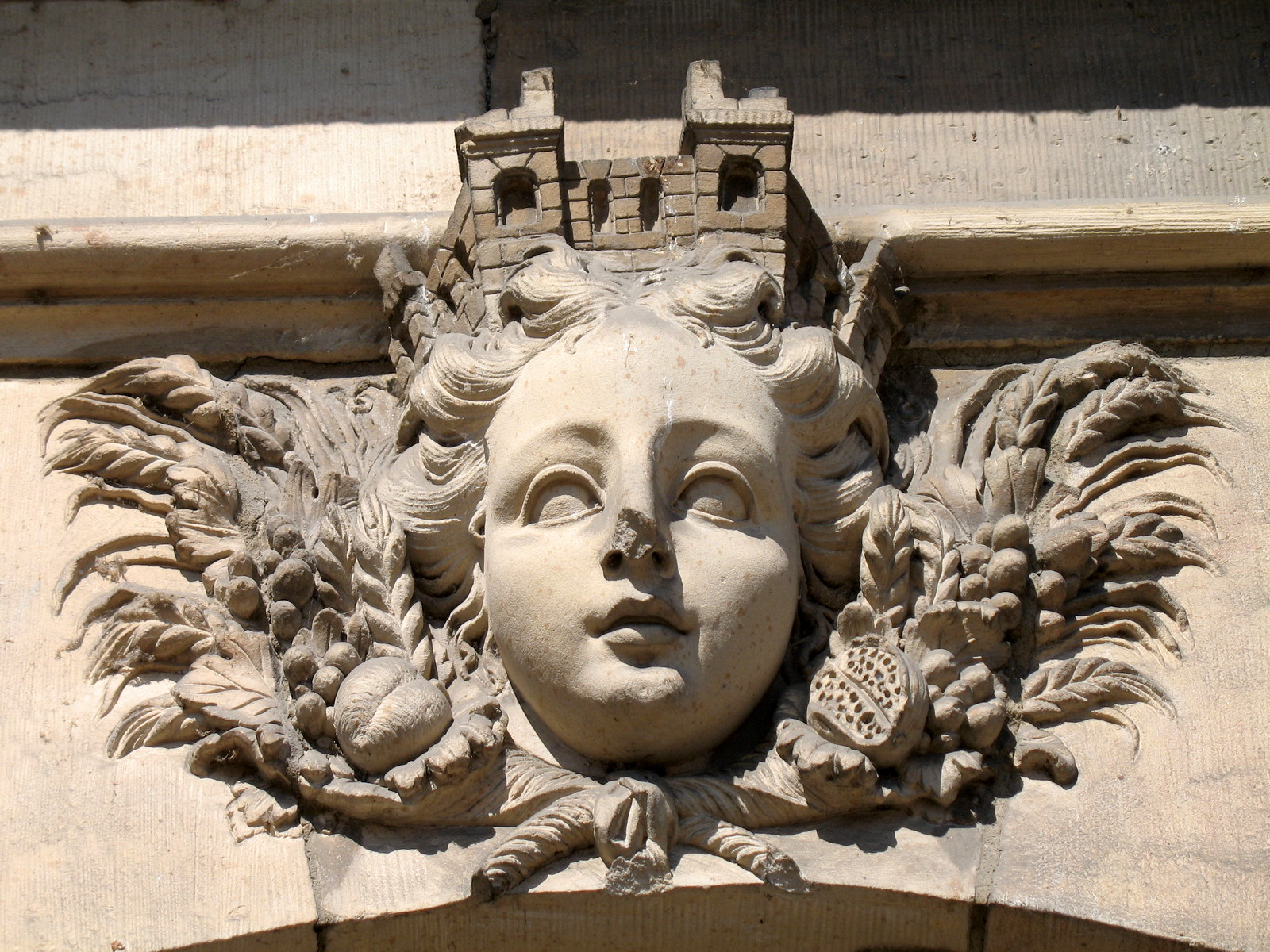
A mascaron depicting Cybele on the riverside façade

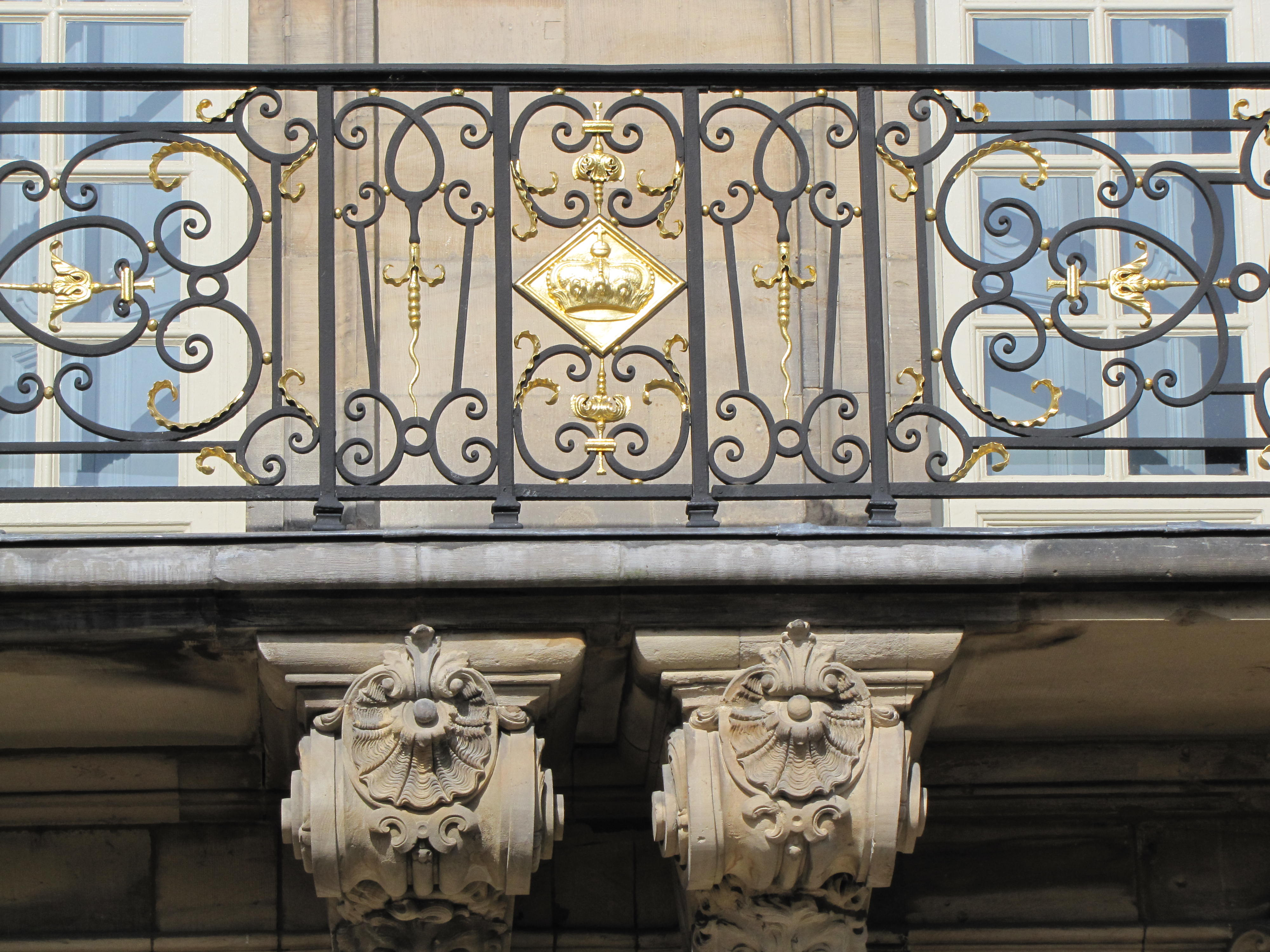
Detail of a wrought iron balcony

== Apartments ==
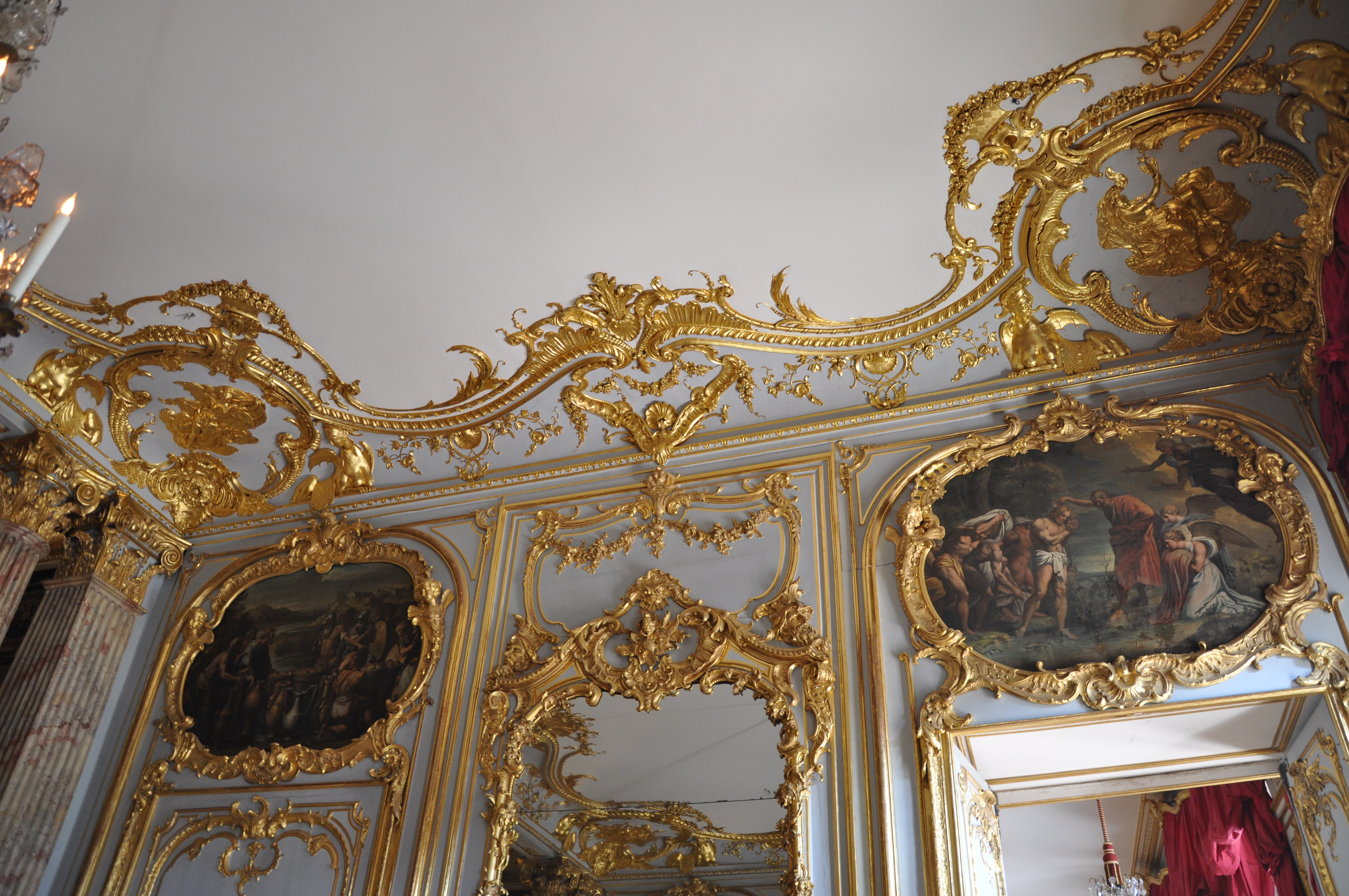
Gilded stucco in the Bedchamber of the King

The apartments on the piano nobile today form a part of the Musée des Arts décoratifs.

The chambers of the prince-bishops and cardinals of the House of Rohan are divided into the grand appartement (display space, facing the river, or south) and petit appartement (living space, facing the inner court and the cathedral, or north), as in the Palace of Versailles. On either side of the suites are the two most spacious rooms of the palace, the Synod Hall (a single, vast room composed of the dining hall and the guards' hall, separated by a row of arches) and the library, which both extend over the entire longitudinal axis of the wing. The library also serves as the nave of the palace's very small chapel. The grand appartement is composed of the Salle des évêques (Bishops' Hall) – the former Antichambre du roi – the Chambre du roi (Bedchamber of the King), the Cabinet du roi (Cabinet of the King), also known as the Salon d'assemblée (Assembly Room) and the Garde-robe du roi (Cloakroom of the King). The "petit appartement" is composed of the Antichambre du prince-évêque, the Chambre du prince-évêque, the Cabinet du prince-évêque (turned into Napoleon's bedchamber after 1800) and the Garde-robe du prince-évêque. The castle's garderobe (Cabinet de commodités) is situated next to the cloakroom of the prince-bishop. The interiors were designed according to the decorative principles established by Jacques-François Blondel in his influential book De la distribution des maisons de plaisance et de la décoration des édifices en général (1738), and the stucco and boiseries were influenced by the style of Nicolas Pineau.

Many of the original furnishings were sold in the wake of the French Revolution. Some works of art, including the overdoors from the Salle des évêques, part of the municipal collections, were destroyed with the museum situated in the Aubette when the Prussian Army shelled the city during the Siege of Strasbourg in 1870. In the 20th century and especially during the reconstruction following the bomb damage of August 1944, a great deal of effort went into locating the surviving missing objects and replacing the lost works with identical or similar pieces. They were supervised by the aforementioned Hans Haug, who had become director of the newly created network of the municipal museums on 1 January 1945. Some elements, though, were never restored, such as the stucco of the library. It was lost in 1817 because of leaks through the ceiling; as the only free-standing part of the building, the library has a flat roof.

Among the works of art on view in the apartments, several stand out for their artistic and historic value. The set of eight (originally nine) tapestries depicting "The History of Constantine" was woven around 1624 after modellos by Rubens. It had been commissioned by Louis XIII, who later presented it to the Marquis of Cinq-Mars. Three tapestries are displayed in the Chambre du roi, one in the Cabinet du roi, and four in the library. The set of eight 17th-century Italian busts of Roman emperors in the Salle des évêques belonged to the personal collection of Cardinal Mazarin. Both sets of works were bought in 1738 from the respective heirs by Armand Gaston de Rohan. Another bust of particular value is the marble portrait of Armand Gaston, sculpted in 1730–1731 in Rome by Edmé Bouchardon. It is also displayed in the library. The floor of the chapel is partly covered with a 1745 (Note: The website of the Musées de Strasbourg erroneously writes "1743", according to Étienne Martin, the carpet was woven between May and November 1745.) imitation of a Turkish carpet, woven in the Aubusson manufactory and bearing in its centre the coat of arms of Armand Gaston de Rohan. The carpet covering the large table in the middle of the library was woven in Portuguese India around 1730. (Note: The website of the Musées de Strasbourg erroneously writes "17th century") It was given to the Cathedral chapter after 1806 and sold to the Musée de Cluny in 1865 but was returned to the city of Strasbourg on permanent loan in 1939. On display in most of the rooms are surviving works from Louis René de Rohan's vast collection of Japanese vases and Chinese pottery and lacquerware from the Ming and Qing dynasties, originally destined for the new castle in Saverne. A curio cabinet in the Garde-robe du prince-évêque displays dessert tableware from the Manufacture de Sèvres, made in 1772–1774 for Louis-René de Rohan's special embassy in Vienna. These items now belong to the Musée des Arts décoratifs.

A pair of large canvases with hunting dogs by Jean-Baptiste Oudry (1742), now hanging in the Salle du synode, once hung in the Parisian hôtel particulier of Samuel-Jacques Bernard. The three paintings in the chapel are copies of works by Antonio da Correggio: Adoration of the Shepherds, Virgin and Child with Sts Jerome and Madeleine, and The Rest on the Return from Egypt. They were made in 1724 in Modena and Parma by Robert de Séry (1686–1733) for Armand Gaston, whom he had met in Rome the same year. De Séry would later provide many other paintings for the cardinal's apartments, all of them copies of paintings by greater masters. Napoleon's green bed is an authentic work by Jacob-Desmalter.

The red canopy bed in the King's bedchamber is a 1989 copy of a bed kept in the Château d'Azay-le-Rideau, thought to be very similar to the lost original. The portraits of kings Louis XIV and Louis XV in the library are copies made in 1950 of originals by Hyacinthe Rigaud kept in the Palace of Versailles. These 20th-century copies are replacements for the 18th-century copies of the same paintings that were destroyed during the French Revolution at the same time as the portraits of the prince-bishops in the Bishops' Hall (see above, History). The overdoor paintings in the antechamber of the prince-bishop are also 20th-century copies, replacing 18th-century copies of French Baroque masters such as Antoine Coypel, Charles Le Brun, and Charles de La Fosse, that were destroyed in 1944. These paintings represent biblical stories; the lost first copies were made in 1737–1740 in Versailles. The other paintings on the walls belong to the Musée des Beaux-Arts, including Louis XV offrant la Paix à L'Europe ("Louis XV presenting Peace to Europe", 1737) by François Lemoyne, on display in the Garde-robe du prince-évêque, and La déification d'Énée ("The Deification of Aeneas", 1749) by Jean Restout the Younger, on display in the Chambre du prince-évêque.

=== Interior views ===
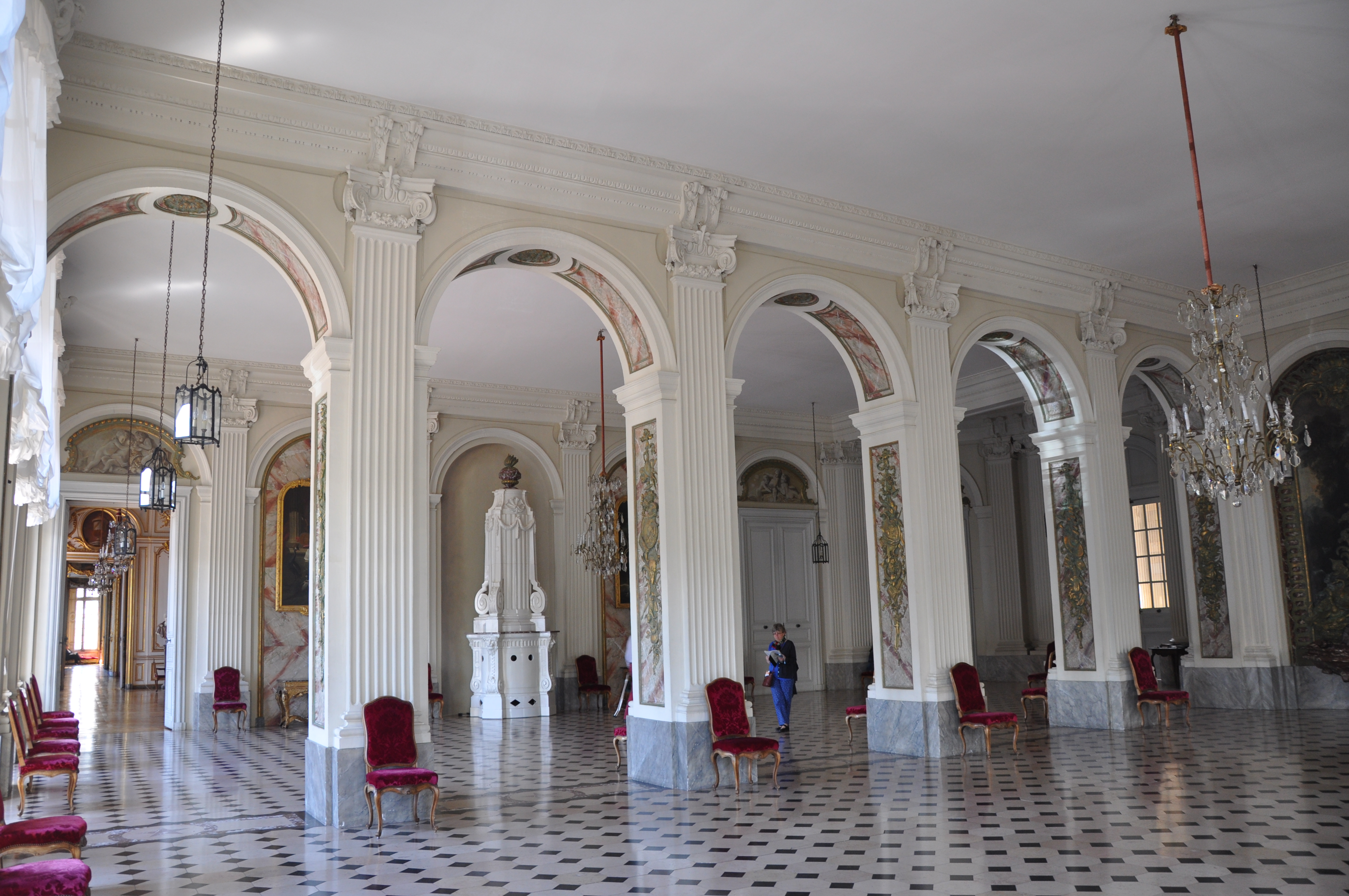
Synod hall

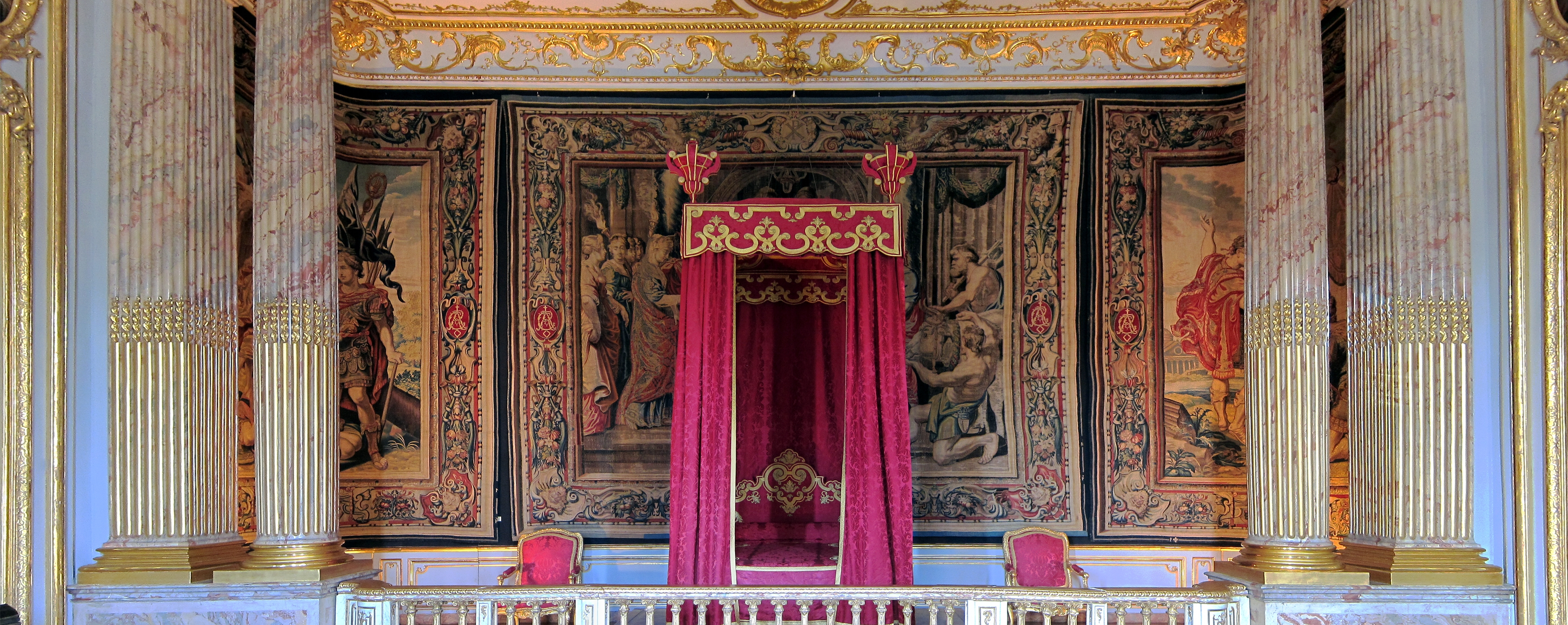
Canopy bed in the King's bedchamber

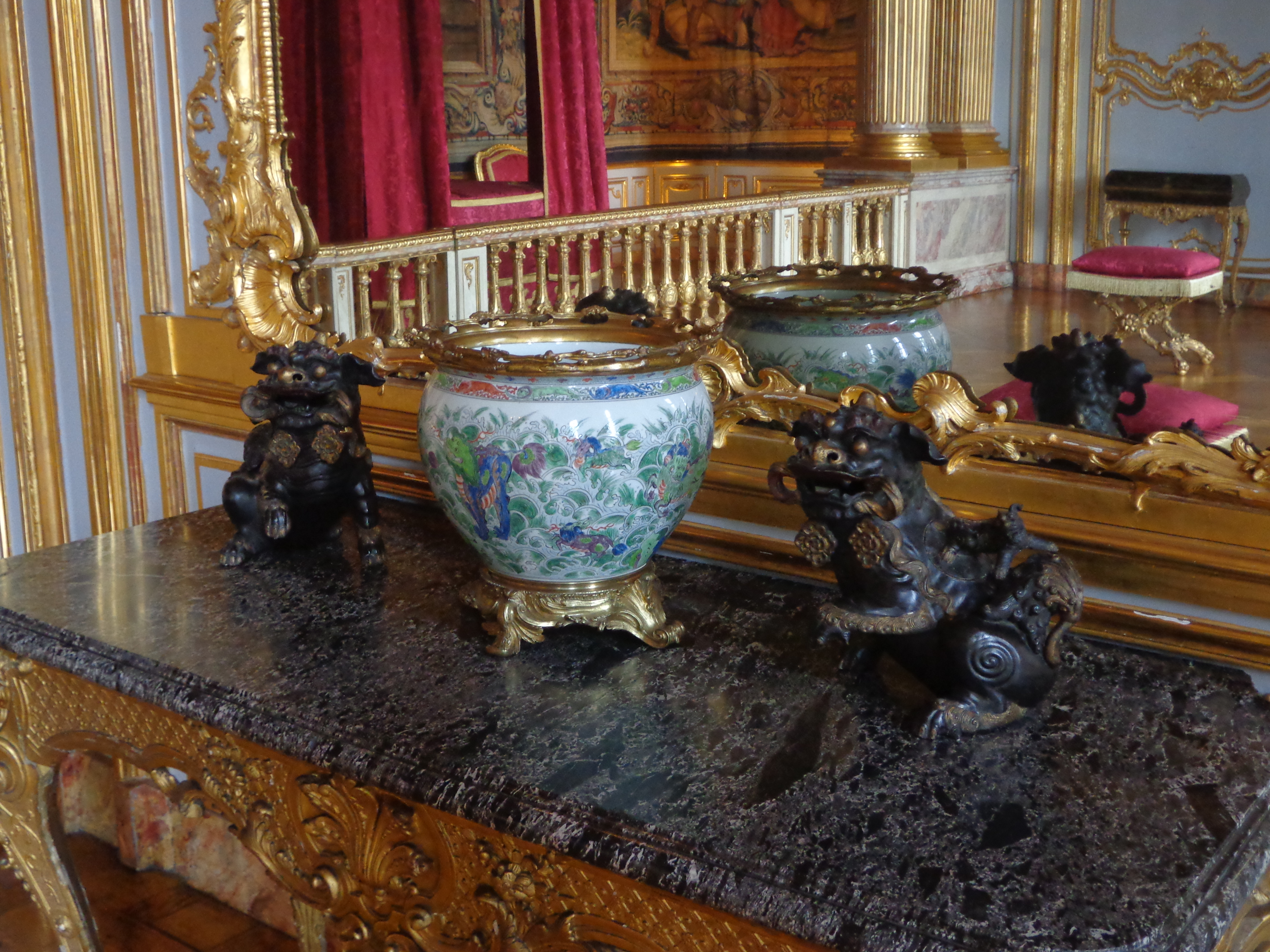
Chinese ceramics in the King's bedchamber

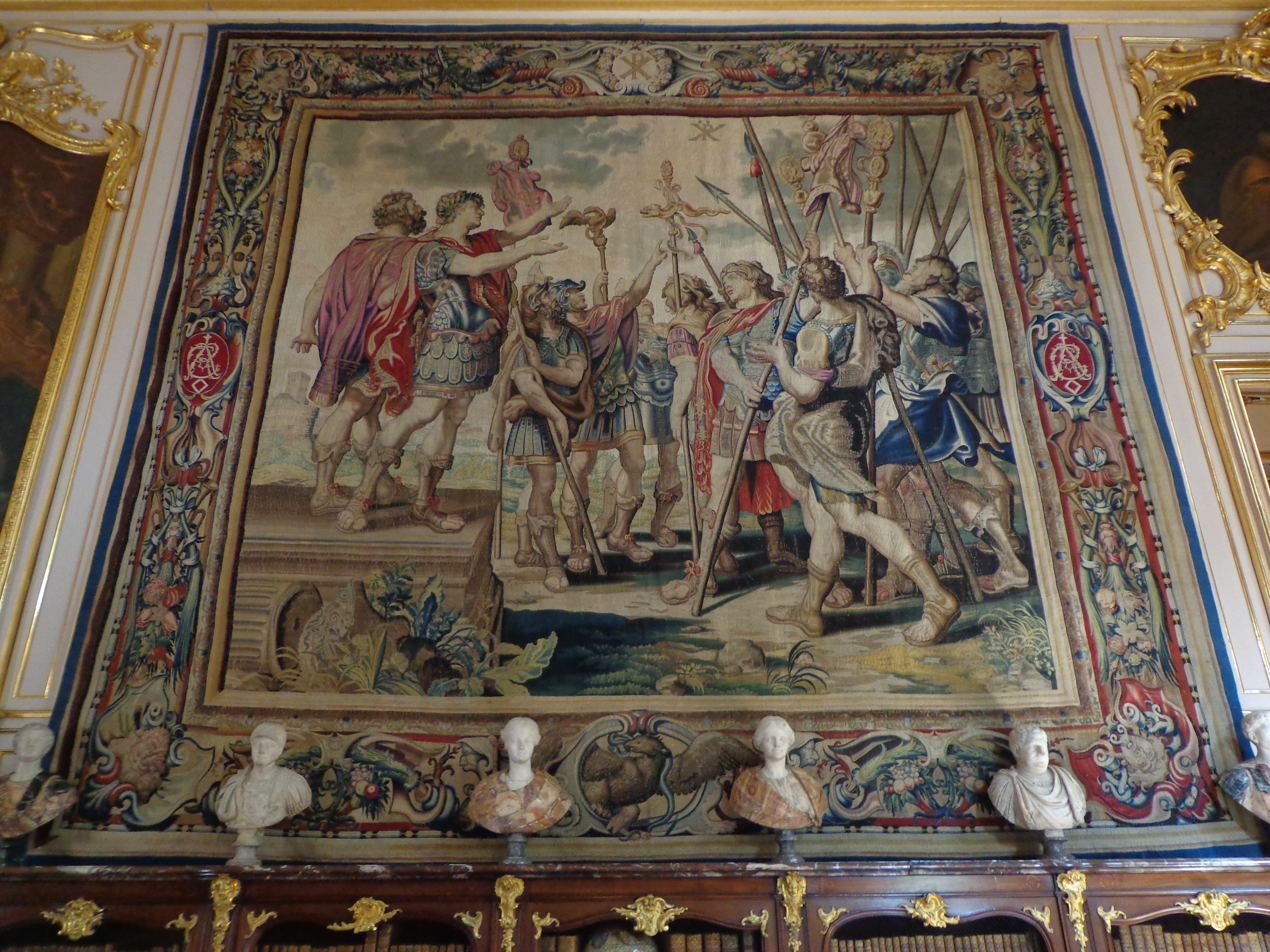
Tapestry from "The History of Constantine" in the library

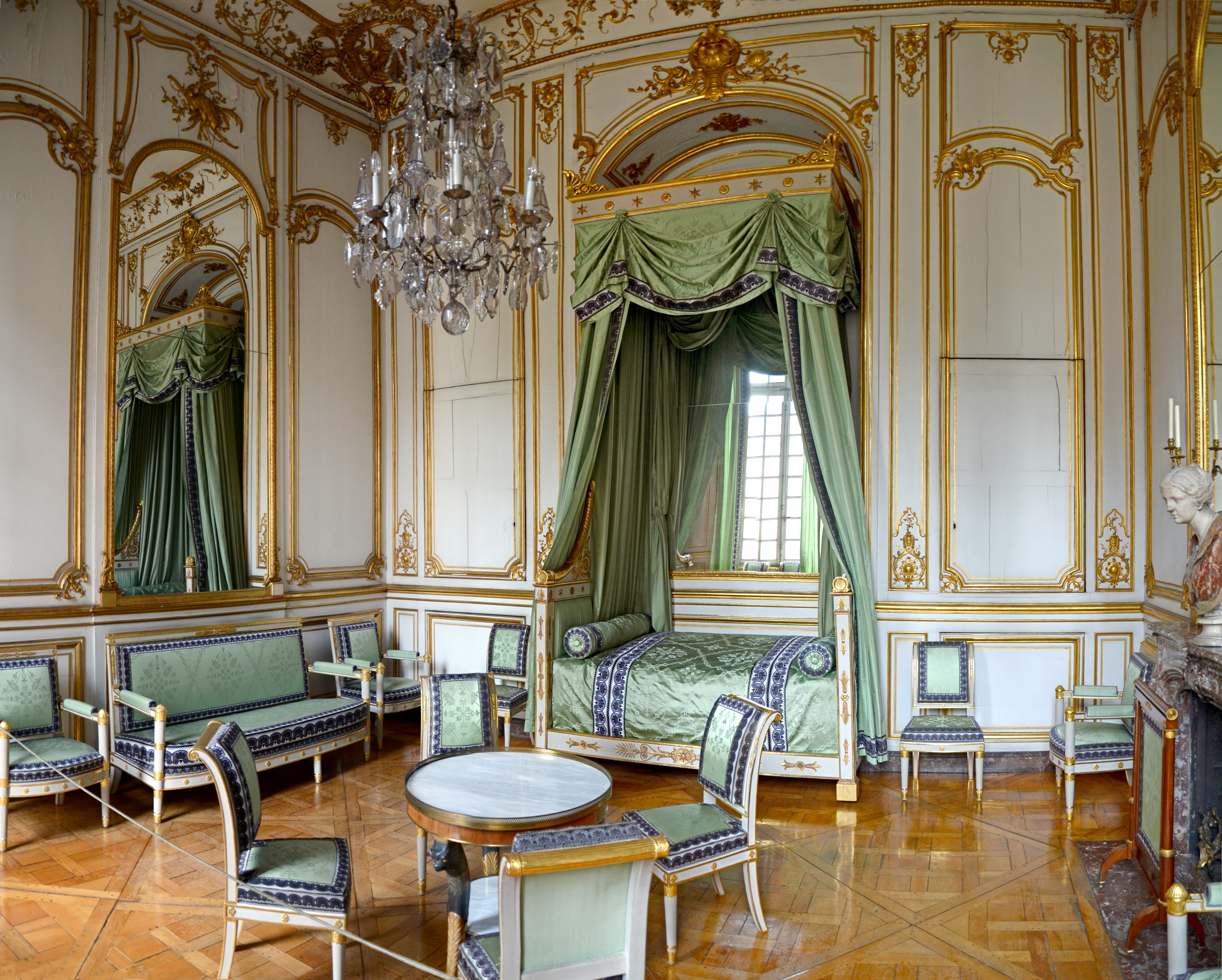
Bedchamber of Napoleon in the Empire style

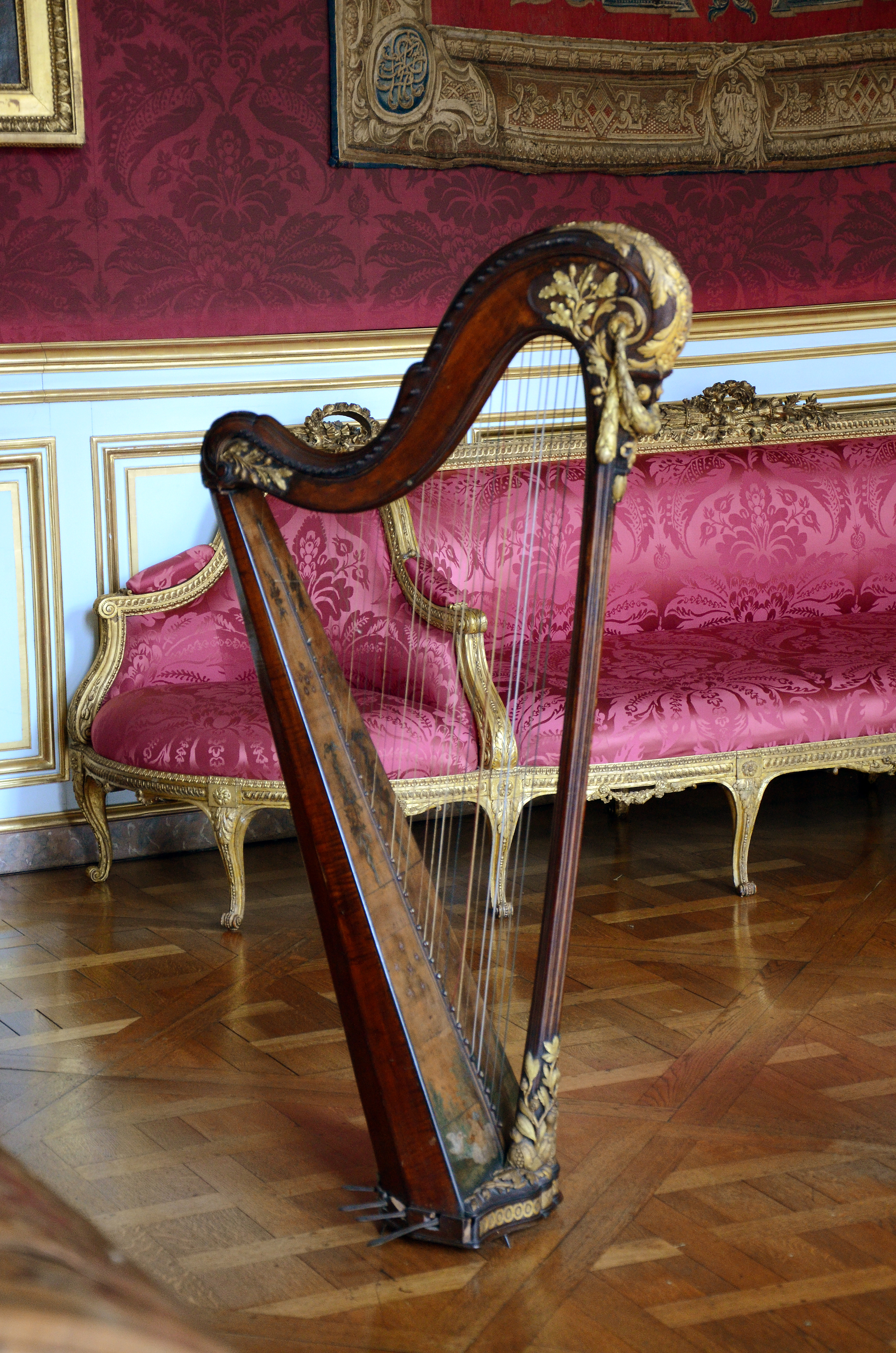
18th-century pedal harp in the Prince-bishop's bedchamber

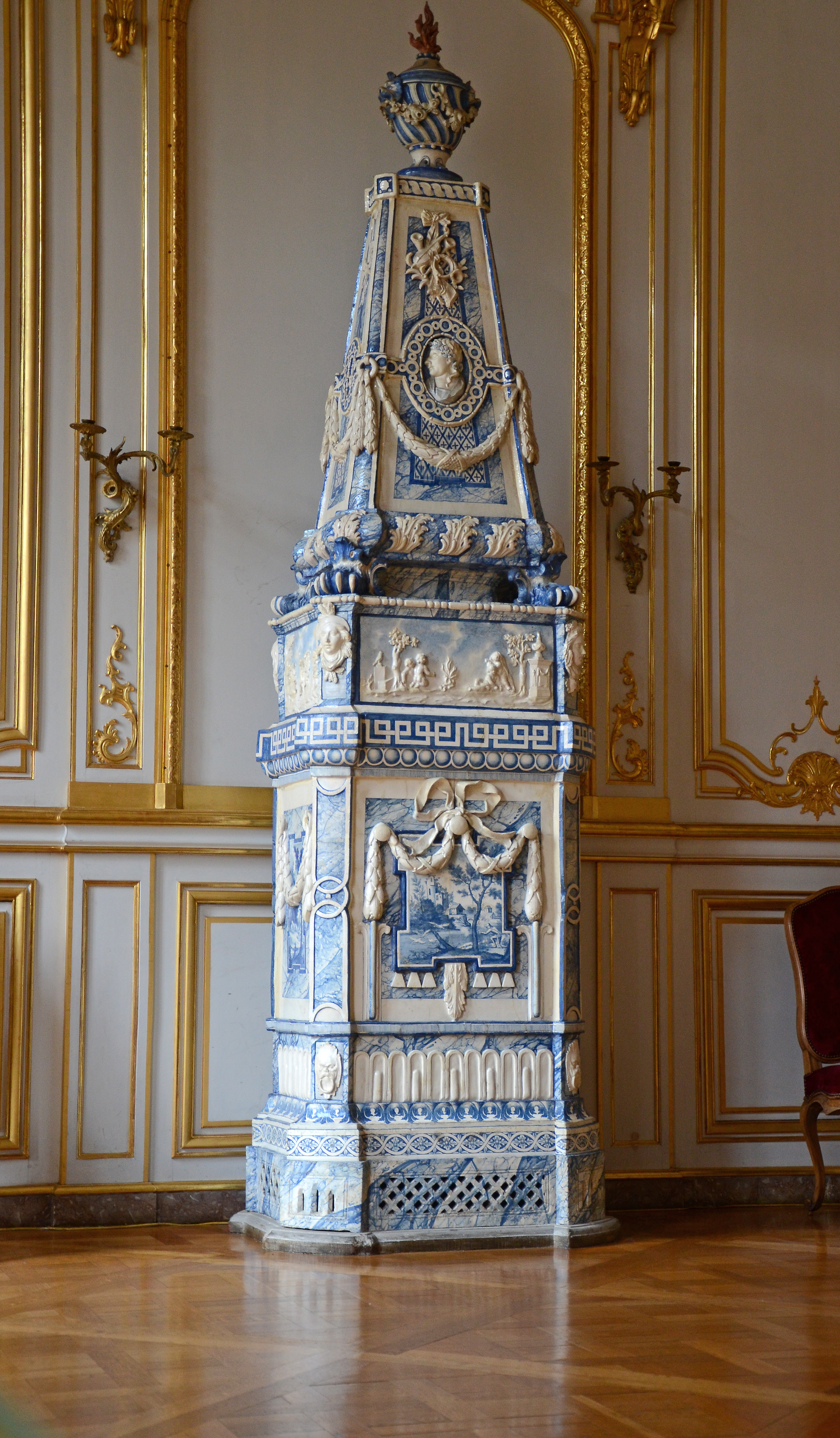
18th-century cocklestove in the Prince-bishop's antechamber

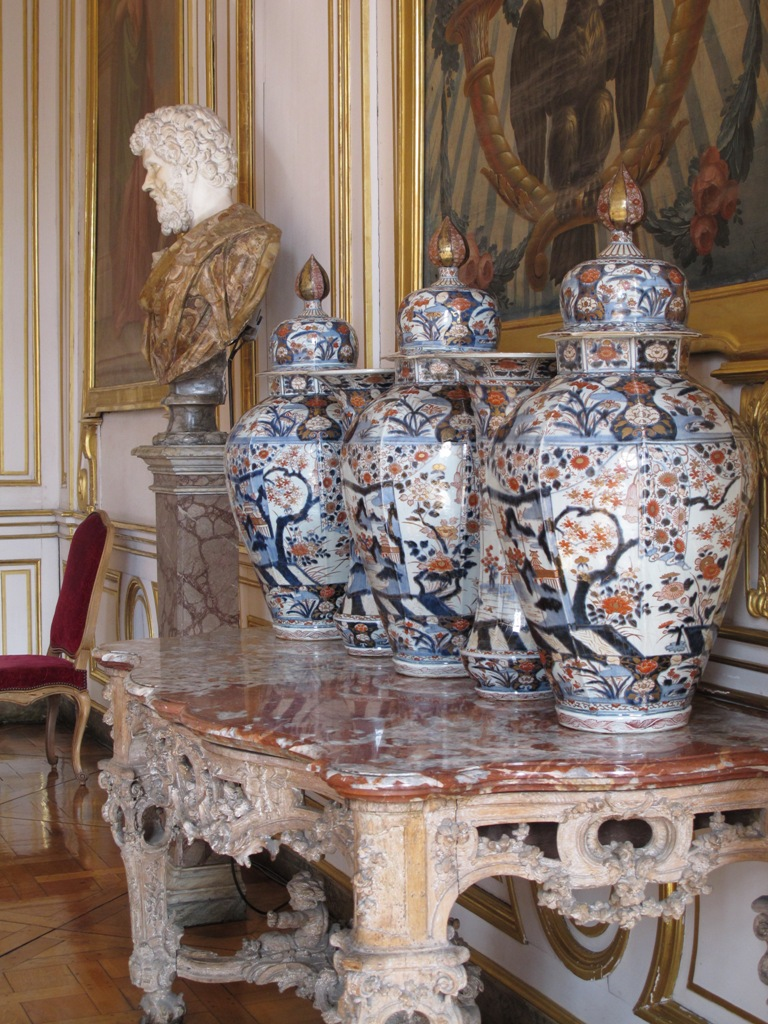
Vases from China and a 17th-century bust of Septimius Severus from the Mazarin collection in the Bishop's hall

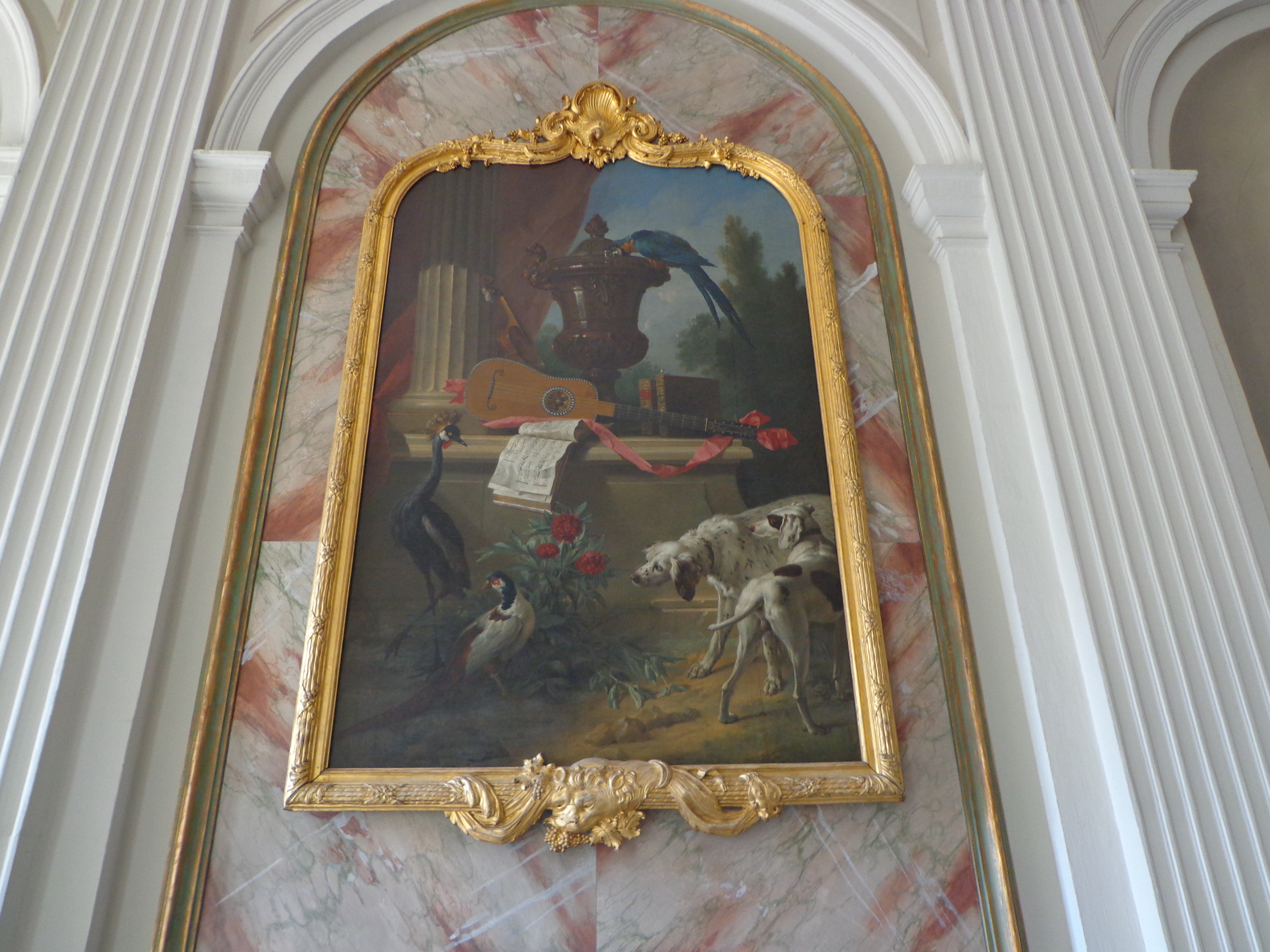
Painting by Jean-Baptiste Oudry (1742) in the Synod hall

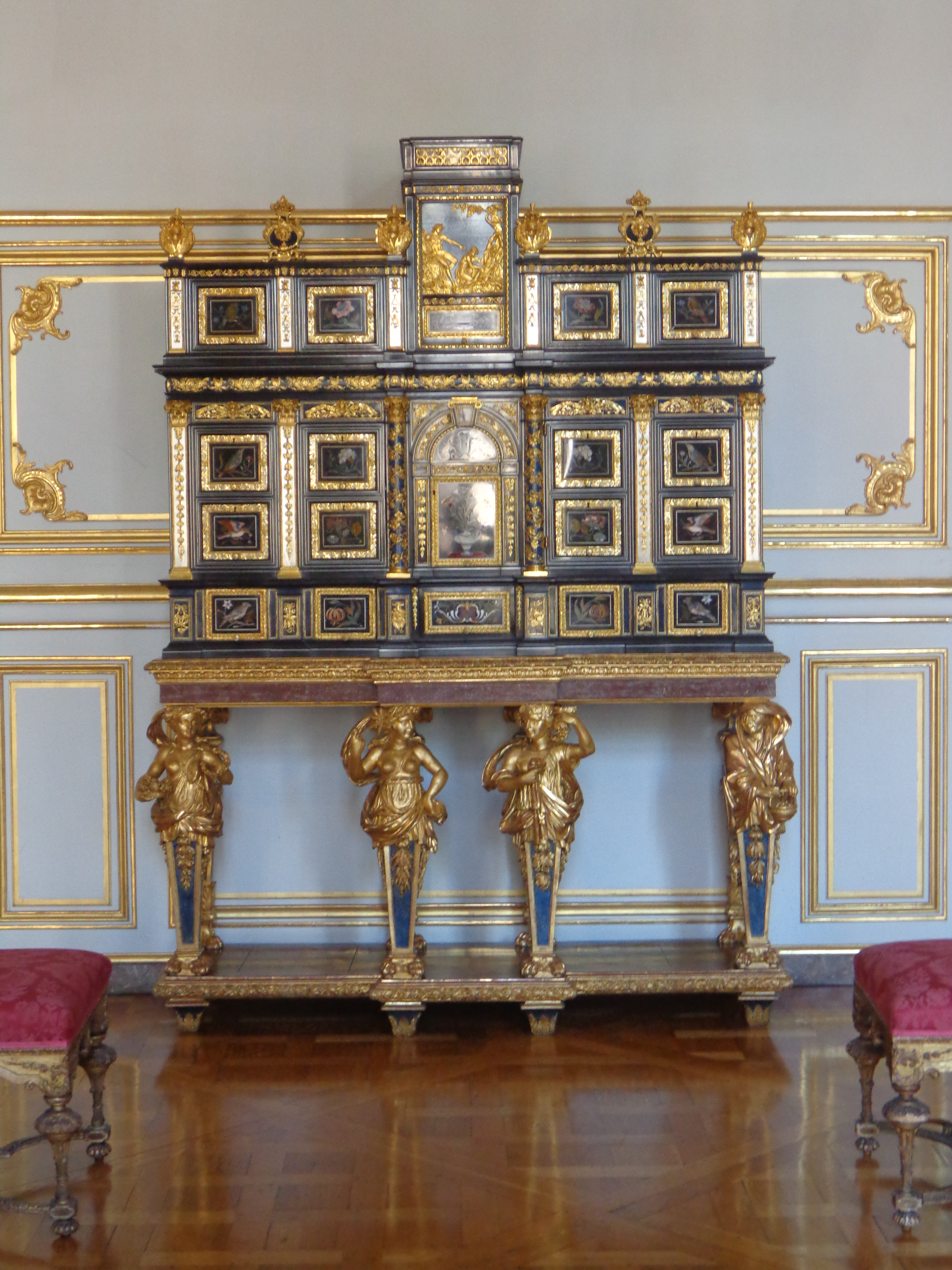
1660s cabinet from Florence, Italy in the Prince-bishop's antechamber

== Museums ==
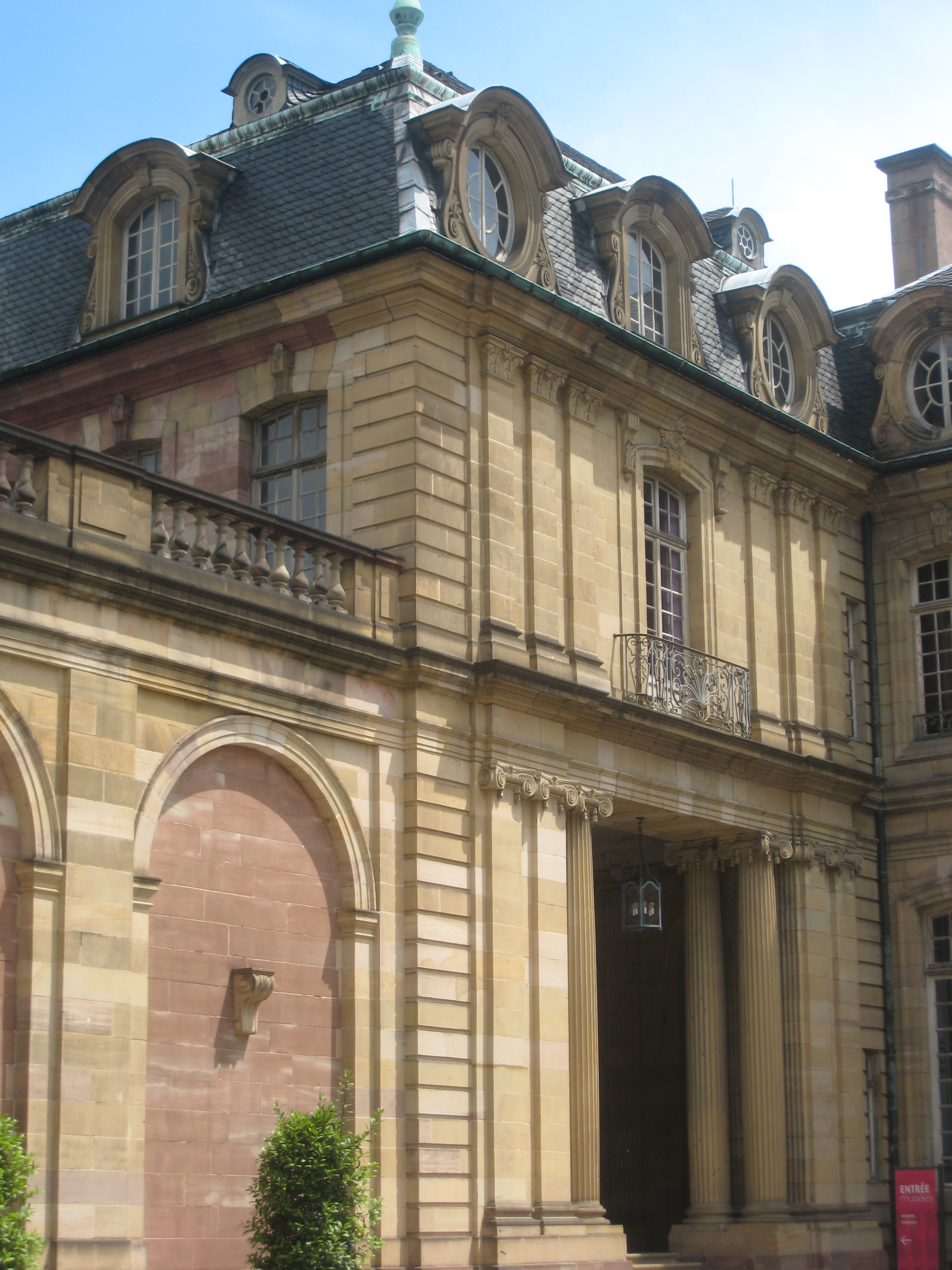
Entrance to the museums (seen in 2008)

=== Musée des Beaux-Arts ===
The Musée des Beaux-Arts (Museum of Fine Arts), on the first and second floors of the palace, is the successor of the Musée de peinture et de sculpture (Museum of painting and sculpture), established in 1803 and entirely destroyed by Prussian artillery shelling and the subsequent violent fire during the night of 24–25 August 1870. The new museum was opened in 1899. The collections present an overview of European art from the 13th century to 1871, with considerable weight given to Italian as well as Flemish and Dutch paintings, with artists such as Hans Memling, Correggio, Anthony van Dyck, Giotto, Pieter de Hooch, Botticelli, Jacob Jordaens, and Tintoretto, among many others. The collections of Upper Rhenish art until 1681 (Baldung, Hemmel, Stoskopff, Witz, and others) had been moved into the dedicated Musée de l'Œuvre Notre-Dame in 1931.

=== Musée des Arts décoratifs ===
The Musée des Arts décoratifs (Museum of Decorative arts) is on the ground floor. It was established in its current form in the years 1920–1924, when the collections of the Kunstgewerbe-Museum Hohenlohe, originally established in 1887, were relocated in the stables wing adjacent to the palace apartments. The collections had previously been in the Renaissance former municipal slaughterhouse Grandes Boucheries or Große Metzig, which now hosts the Musée historique de Strasbourg.) The museum suffered in the World War II bombing raids of 1944 but the building has since been restored and the collections replenished. Besides the furniture and decoration of the cardinals' apartments, the collections focus on the local production of porcelain (Strasbourg faience), silver-gilt, and clockmaking, with original parts of the medieval Strasbourg astronomical clock including the automaton rooster from 1354. The reconstructed living room of a former hôtel particulier, the 1750s Hôtel Oesinger, displays 18th-century furniture in situ on a more intimate scale than the rooms of the palace.

=== Musée archéologique ===
The Musée archéologique (Archaeological Museum) is in the basement. The former archaeological collections of the city had been entirely destroyed, along with the municipal library, during the Siege of Strasbourg in 1870. A new collection was started in 1876 on behalf of the "Society for the preservation of the historical monuments of Alsace" (French: Société pour la conservation des Monuments historiques d'Alsace, German: Gesellschaft zur Erhaltung der geschichtlichen Denkmäler im Elsass). It was moved into the palace in 1889, first opened to the public in 1896, and moved to its present location in 1907. The museum displays finds from northern Alsace from the Paleolithic Era to the Merovingian dynasty, with a special focus on Argentoratum.

== See also ==
- List of Baroque residences
