= Neubau, Strasbourg =

Neubau, Le Neue Bau, Neuer Bau
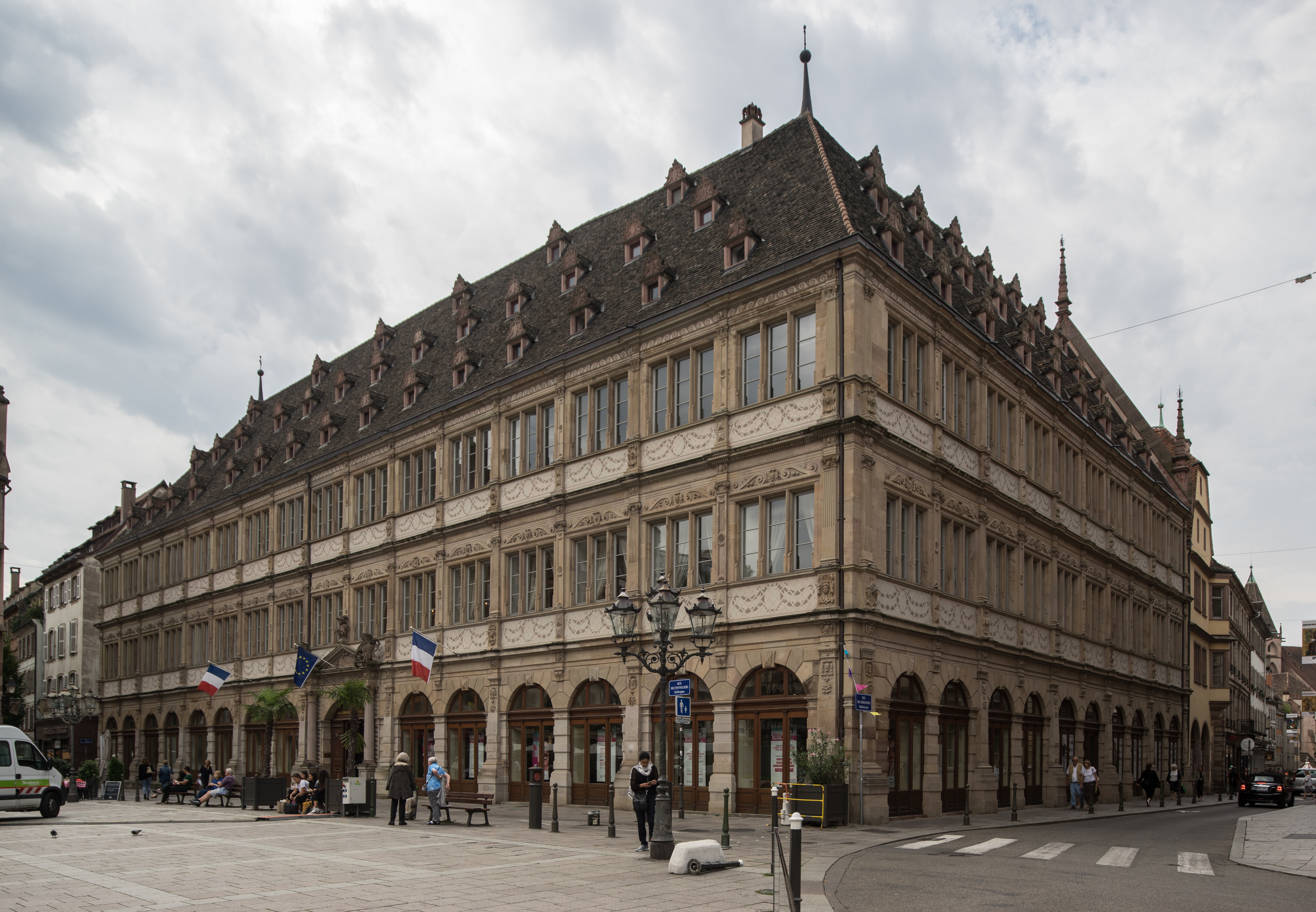
- Seen in September 2018

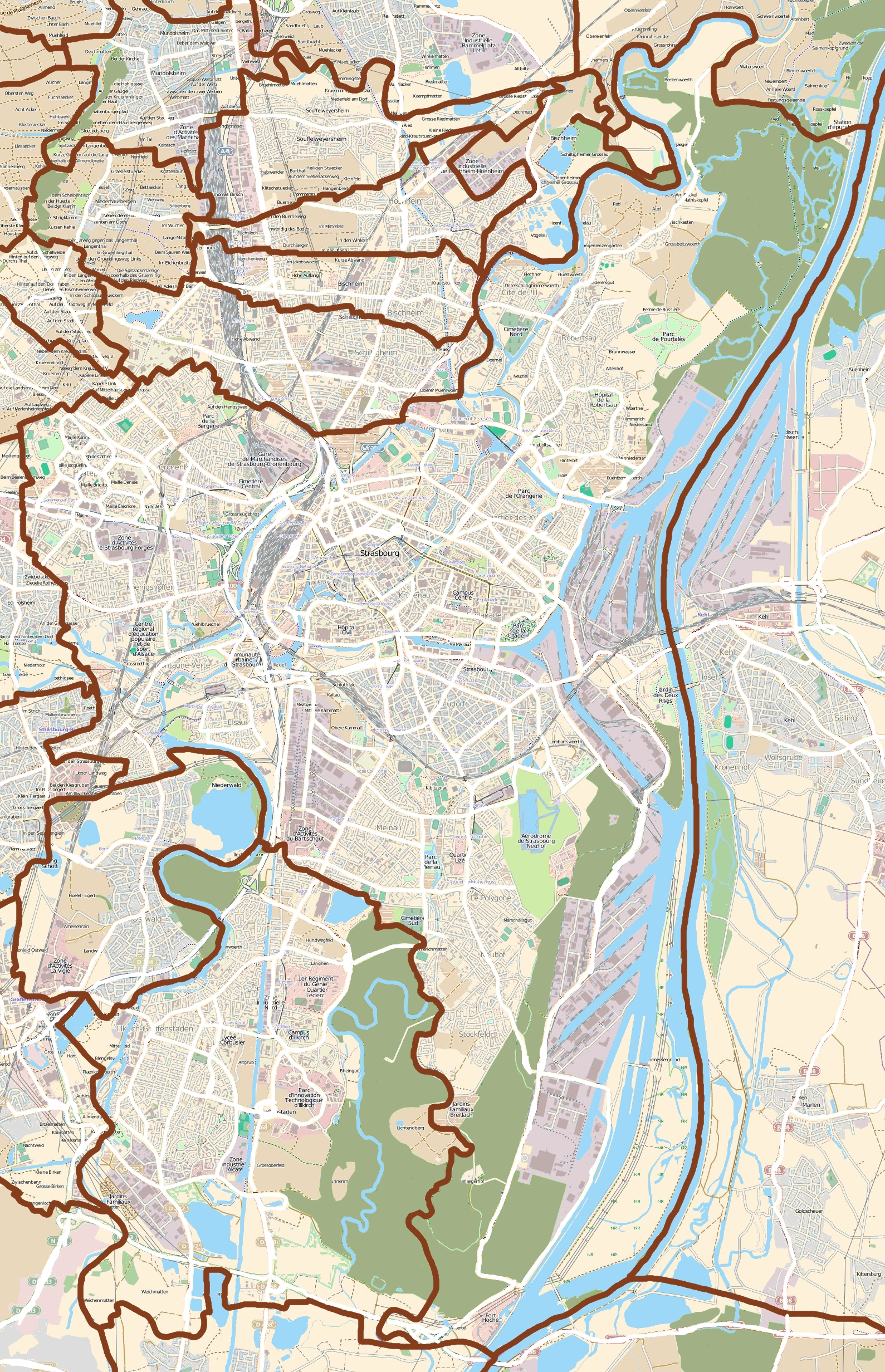
- Location within Strasbourg
- Alternative names: Chambre de commerce et d'industrie, CCI

General information
- Type: Civic
- Architectural style: Renaissance
- Location: Strasbourg, France, 10 Place Gutenberg, 67000 Strasbourg
- Coordinates: 48°34′51.36″N 7°44′53.86″E
- Current tenants: CCI de Strasbourg et du Bas-Rhin
- Construction started: 1582
- Completed: 1585; 1867
- Renovated: 2004–2008

Technical details
- Floor count: 3

The Neubau, also known as Le Neue Bau or Neuer Bau(German for "new building") is a historic building located on the Grande Île in the city center of Strasbourg, in the French department of the Bas-Rhin. It has been classified as a Monument historique since 1995.

The Neubau is the most representative example of Renaissance architecture in Strasbourg and is, as such, a major landmark of the old town.

== History ==
The New Building was designed, literally, as a "new building" with no specific purpose at first apart from adding some space to the older administrative buildings that stood then on what is now Place Gutenberg: the town hall (demolished in 1781), the chancery (demolished in 1800), the mint (demolished in 1738). The novelty of the building was also reflected by its then decidedly modern style, probably the work of architects and artists from Switzerland. The pilasters of the three floors are crowned (from top to bottom) with Tuscan, Ionian and Corinthian capitals. Strasbourg's other Renaissance civic buildings and palaces, such as the butcher's hall Grosse Metzig (now housing the Musée historique) or the Hôtel de Boecklinsau were all built or started in the decade following the opening of the Neubau.

In 1781, the Neubau became the new town hall of Strasbourg after the ancient town hall (or Pfalz), a medieval building, was torn down and razed. During the French Revolution, the new town hall was pillaged and the original furniture all but disappeared. It became the Chamber of commerce in 1792 and was refurnished by orders of Napoleon in 1802; thus the reception rooms now display Baroque tapestries and early 19th-century furniture. In 1867, the architect, Eugène Petiti (1809–1883) added an aisle on the south side of the building, exactly replicating the 1580s style.

The Neubau was completely renovated in the 2000s.

== Gallery ==
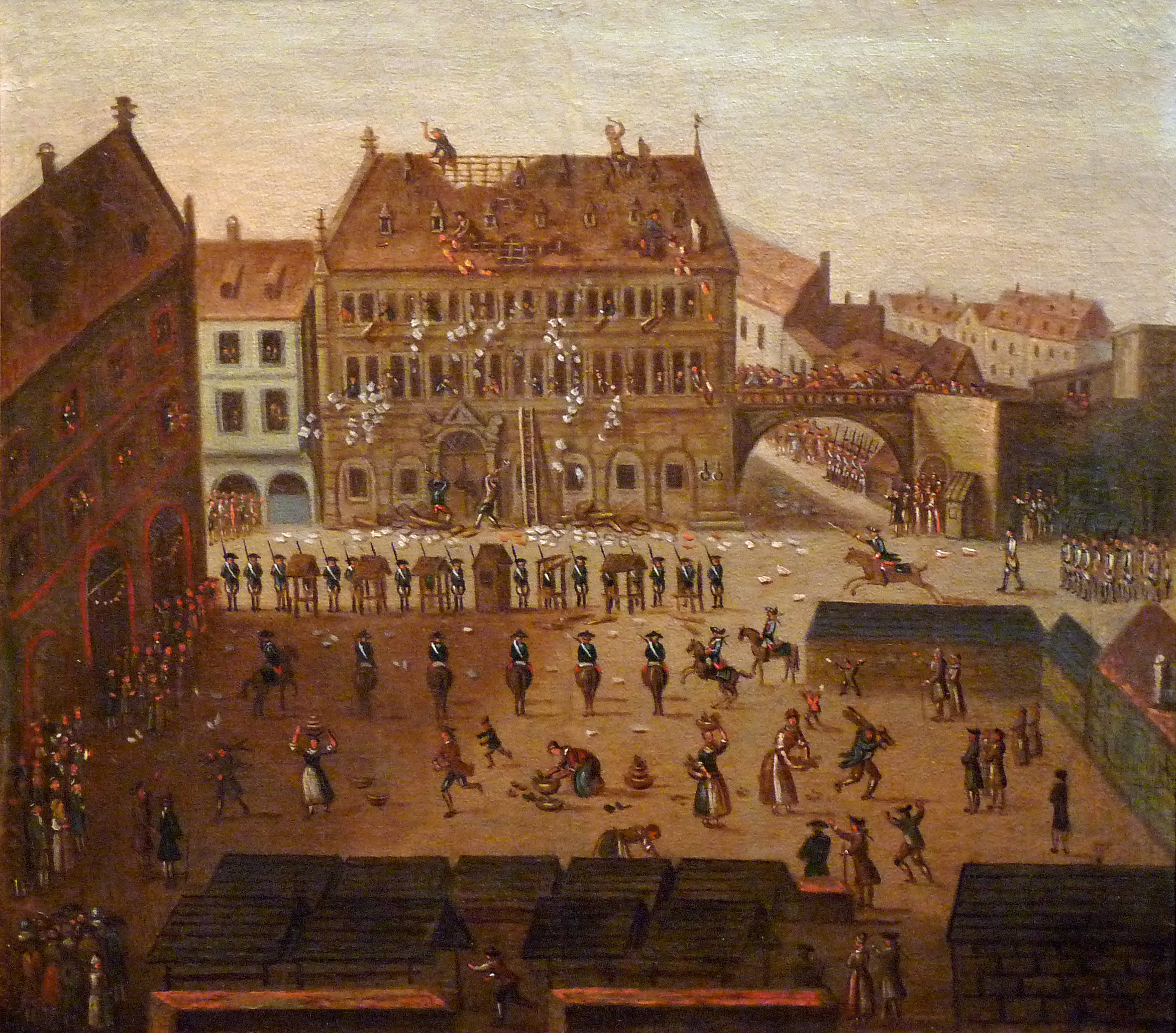
Ransacking of the hôtel de ville by French Revolutionaries on 21 July 1789 (painting in the Musée historique de Strasbourg)

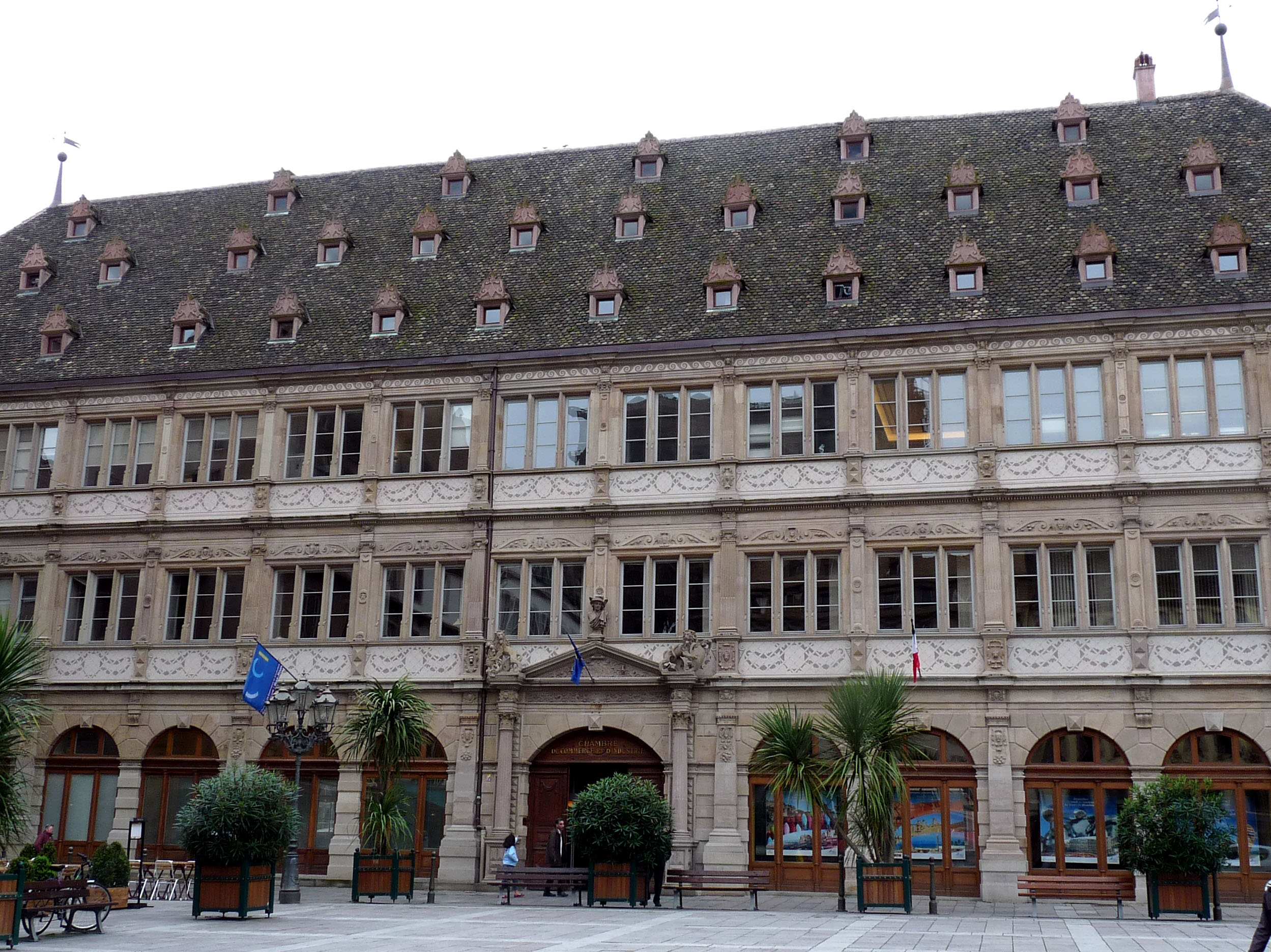
Façade in 2009

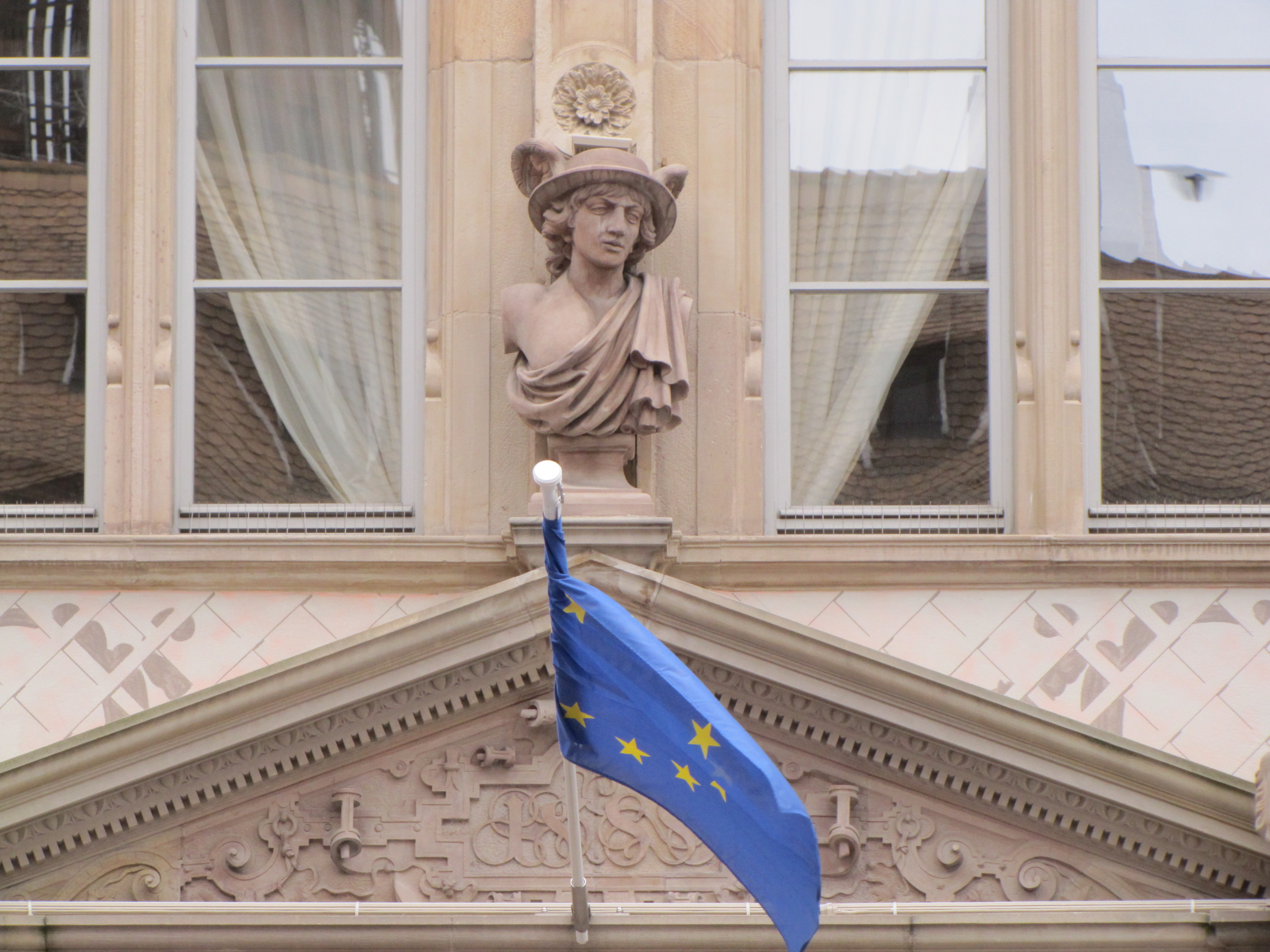
Pediment of the main portal and bust of Mercurius

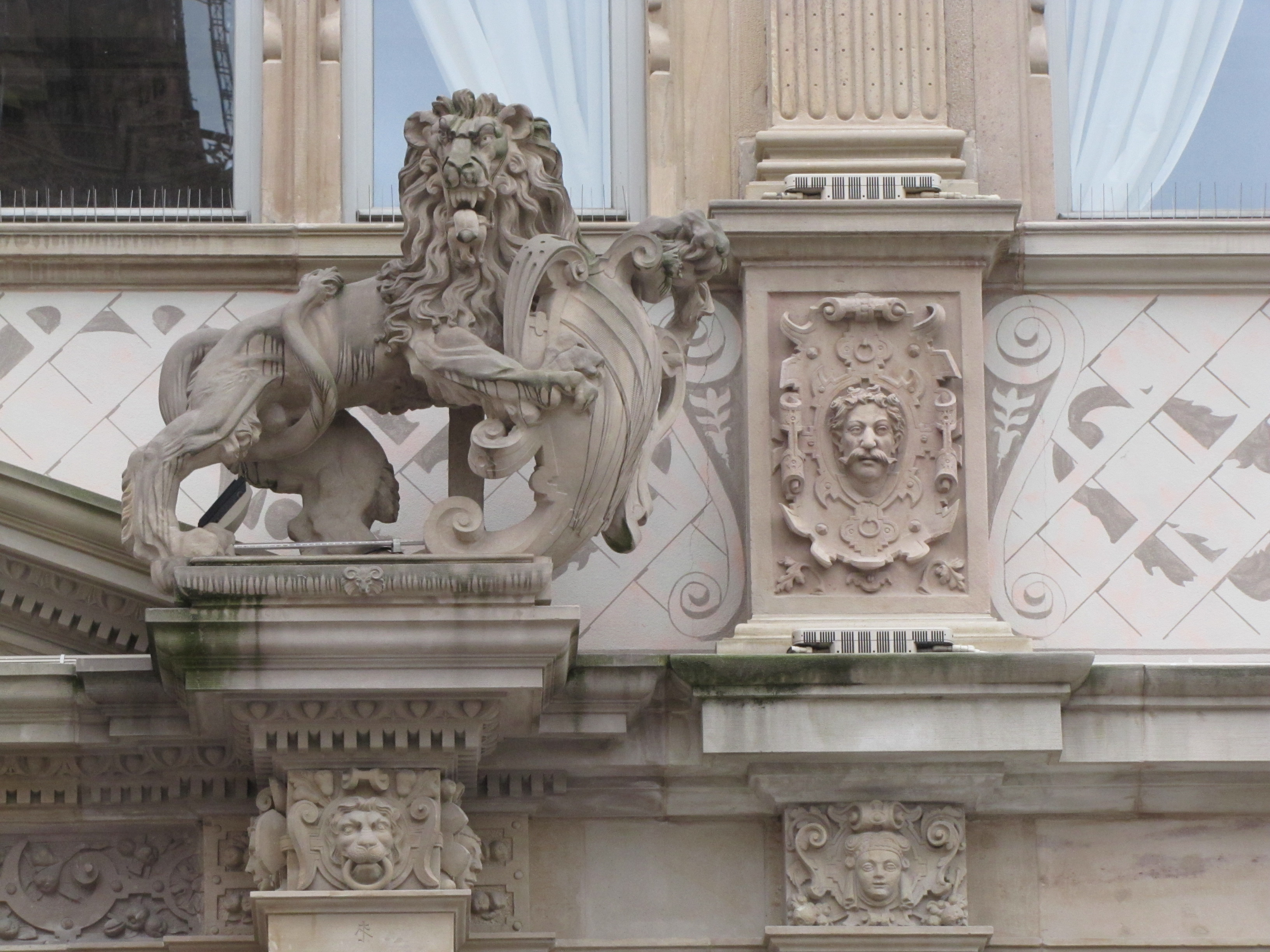
Lion of central portal and reliefs of façade

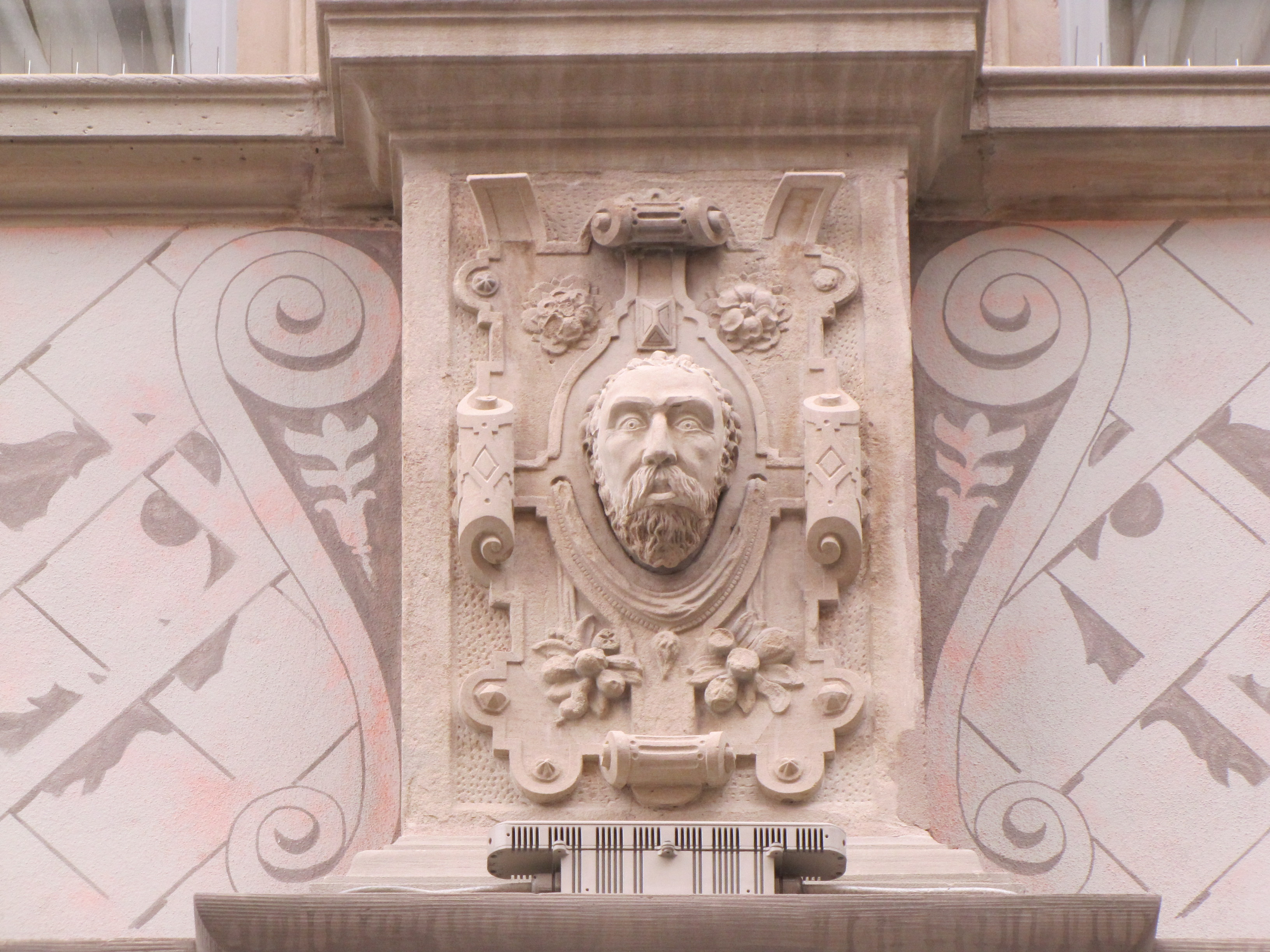
Detail of reliefs and sgraffito

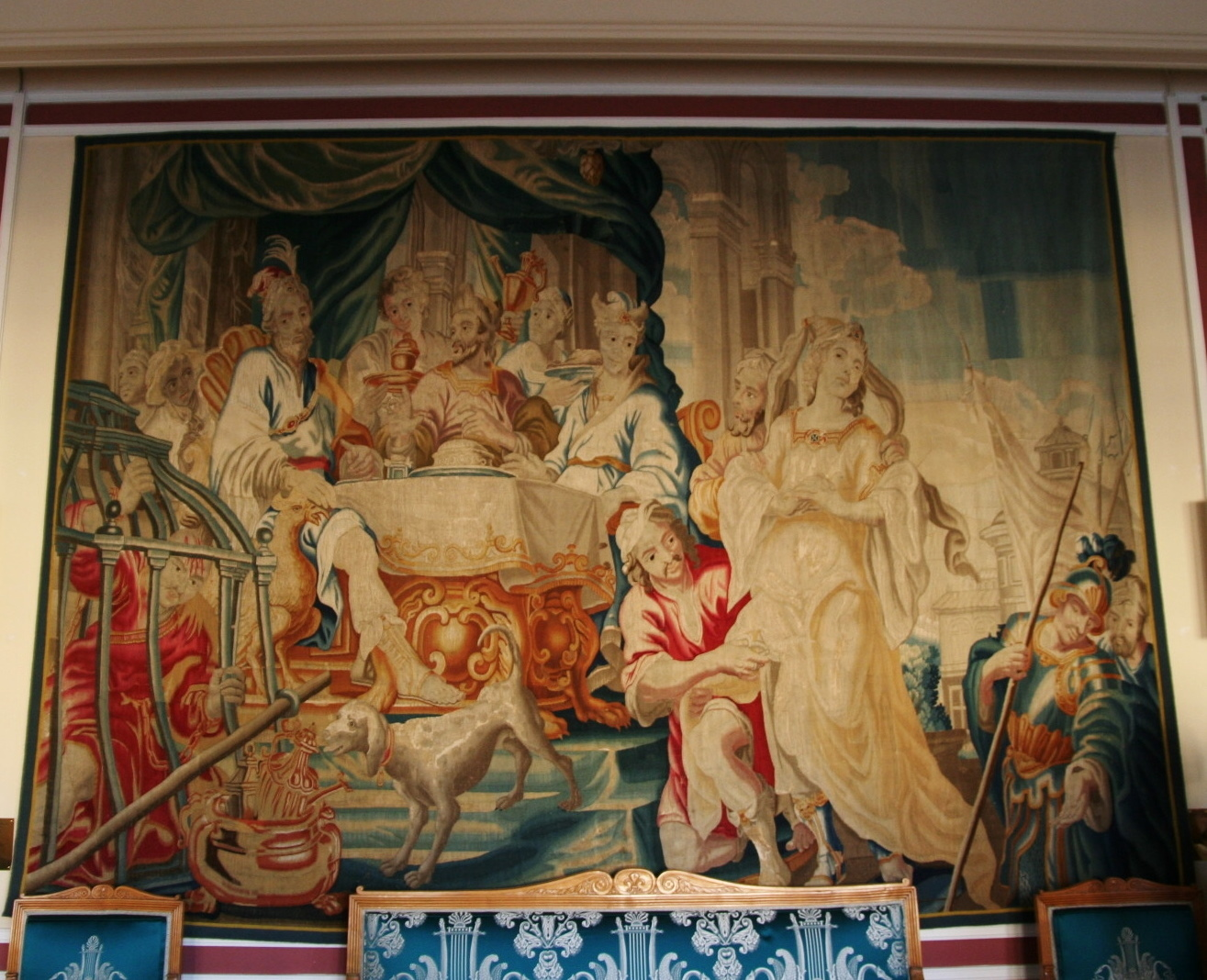
17th-century tapestry from Flanders depicting the humiliation of Bayezid I by Timur

== Literature ==
- Recht, Roland; Foessel, Georges; Klein, Jean-Pierre: Connaître Strasbourg, 1988, ISBN 2-7032-0185-0, pages 155–157

== See also ==
- Hôtel de Hanau
