= Musée historique de Strasbourg =

Museum in Strasbourg, France

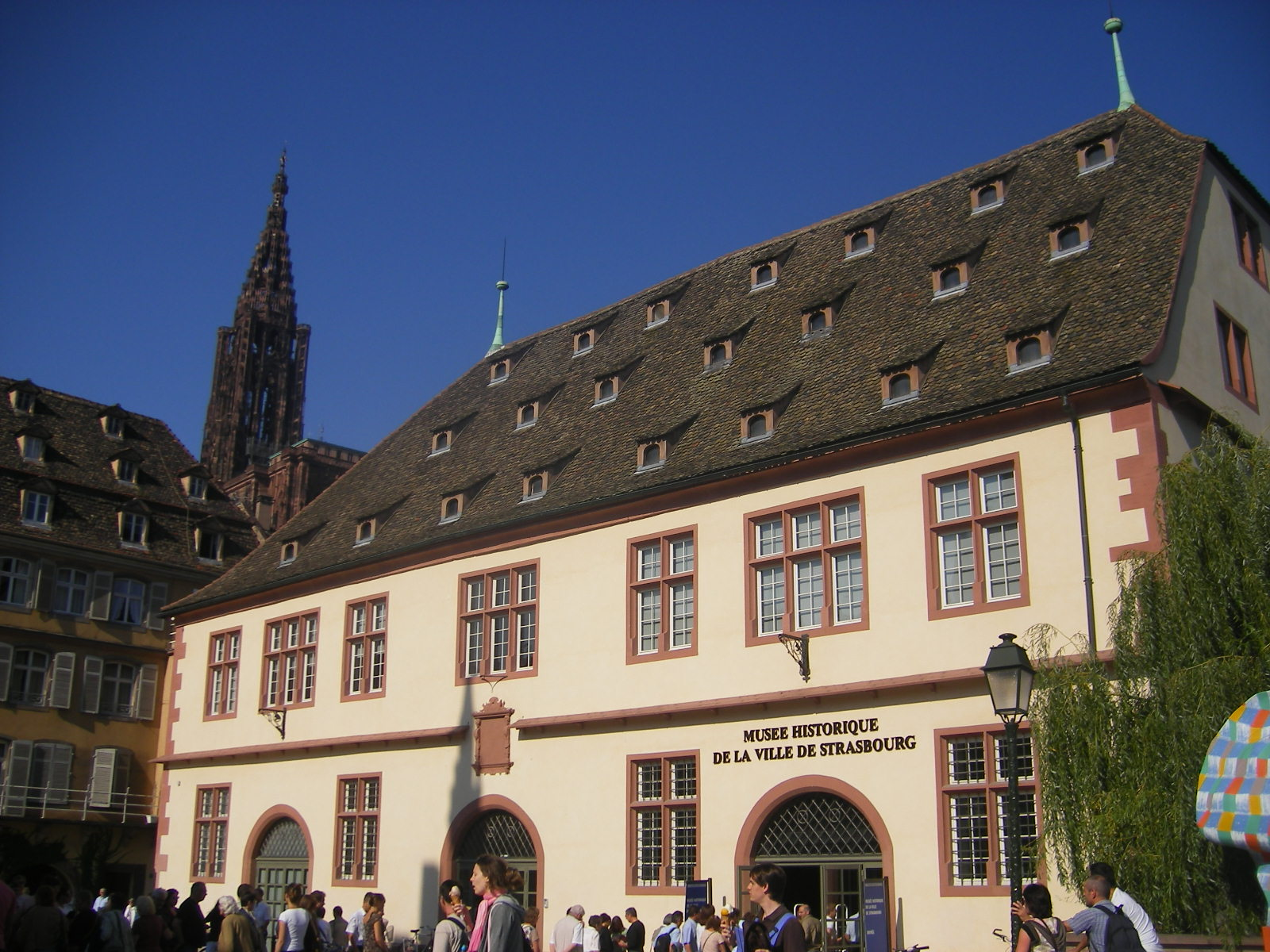
- Entrance of the museum

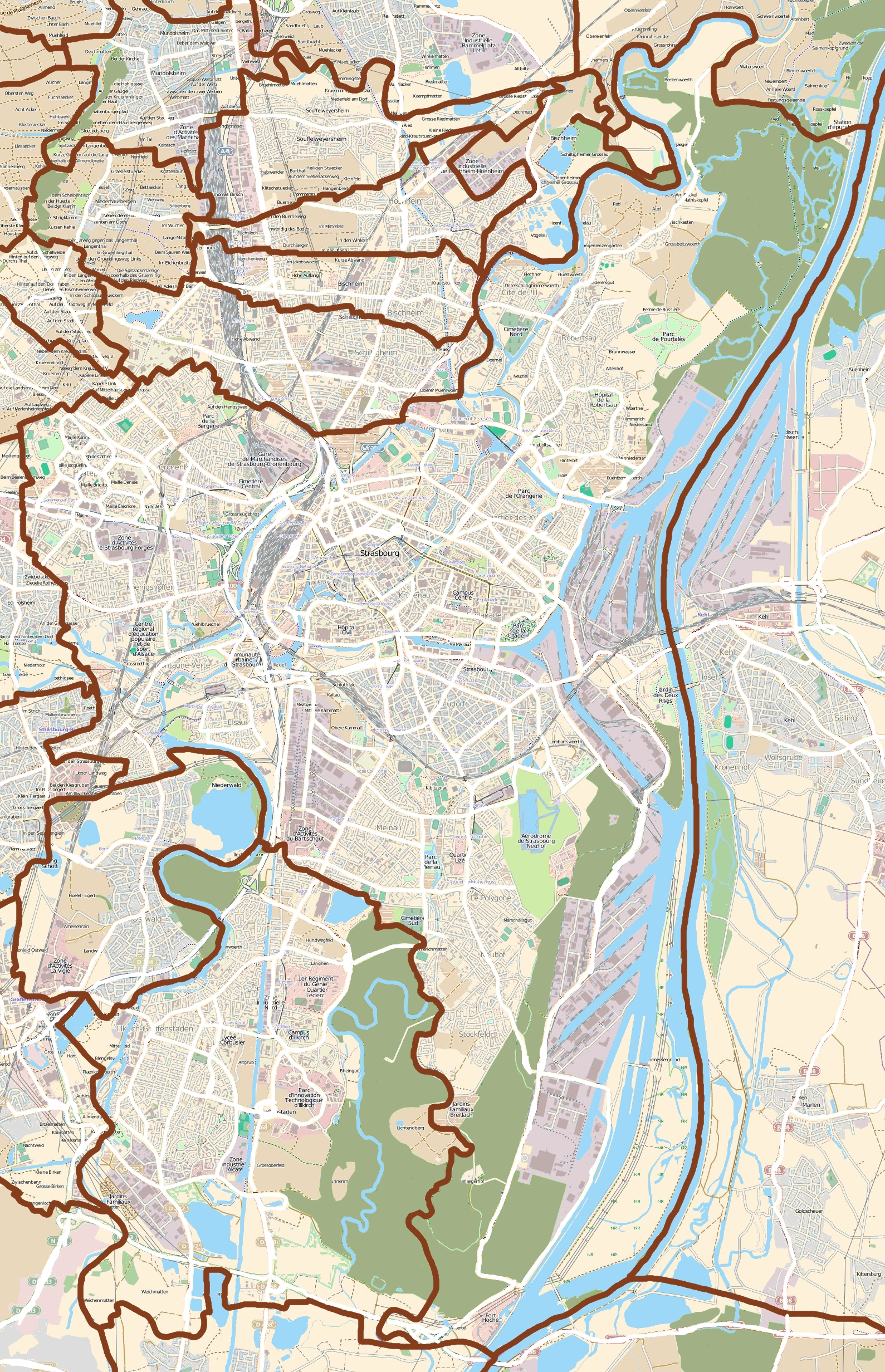
- Location within Strasbourg
- Coordinates: 48.58°N 7.750833°E
- Website: musees.strasbourg.eu

The Musée historique (transl. Historical museum; de la ville de Strasbourg) is a museum in Strasbourg in the Bas-Rhin department of France. It is located in the Renaissance building of the former slaughterhouse (Grande boucherie) and is dedicated to the tumultuous history of the city from the early Middle Ages until the contemporary period.

== History ==
Founded in 1920, the museum occupies the building of the former Great Butchery of Strasbourg (built in 1586–1588), classified as a historical monument.

On June 30, 2007, after twenty years of closure for works, the museum reopened its doors under the direction of Monique Fuchs to present a first slice of the history of Strasbourg, ranging from the first traces of civilization to the year 1800; the second section opened on 16 November 2013, it corresponds to the first floor of the building and covers the Napoleonic period up to the present day. At the end of 2013, the reopening is therefore complete and all the rooms of the museum are open to the public.

== Collections ==
The museum presents the political, economic and social history of Strasbourg, through a set of military objects, clothing, paintings, drawings, sculptures and a whole collection of objects ranging from the Middle Ages to the 18th century. More recent collections should be presented after the end of the second phase of the work.

Only 1,650 of the 200,000 objects in the museum's possession are presented, including a remarkable piece: a relief map dating from 1727. This is a representation of the city and its immediate surroundings in the form of a model, at the 1/600th scale, on an area of nearly 80 m2.

The museum houses numerous exhibits and collections, mostly donated by the citizens of Strasbourg, but also from the rest of Alsace. For example, there is a military collection of around 160 uniforms and documents here.

Collections from the European institutes in Strasbourg (including the Council of Europe and the European Court of Human Rights) were also contributed to the museum. An example of this is the judicial robe of Jean-Paul Costa, former President of the European Court of Human Rights.

== Bibliography ==
- Les collections du Musée historique de la ville de Strasbourg : de la ville libre à la ville révolutionnaire, Strasbourg, Musées de la ville de Strasbourg, 2008, ISBN 2-35125-053-2
