= Strasbourg =

Prefecture in Grand Est, France

Strasbourg Strossburi (Alsatian)
- Prefecture and commune
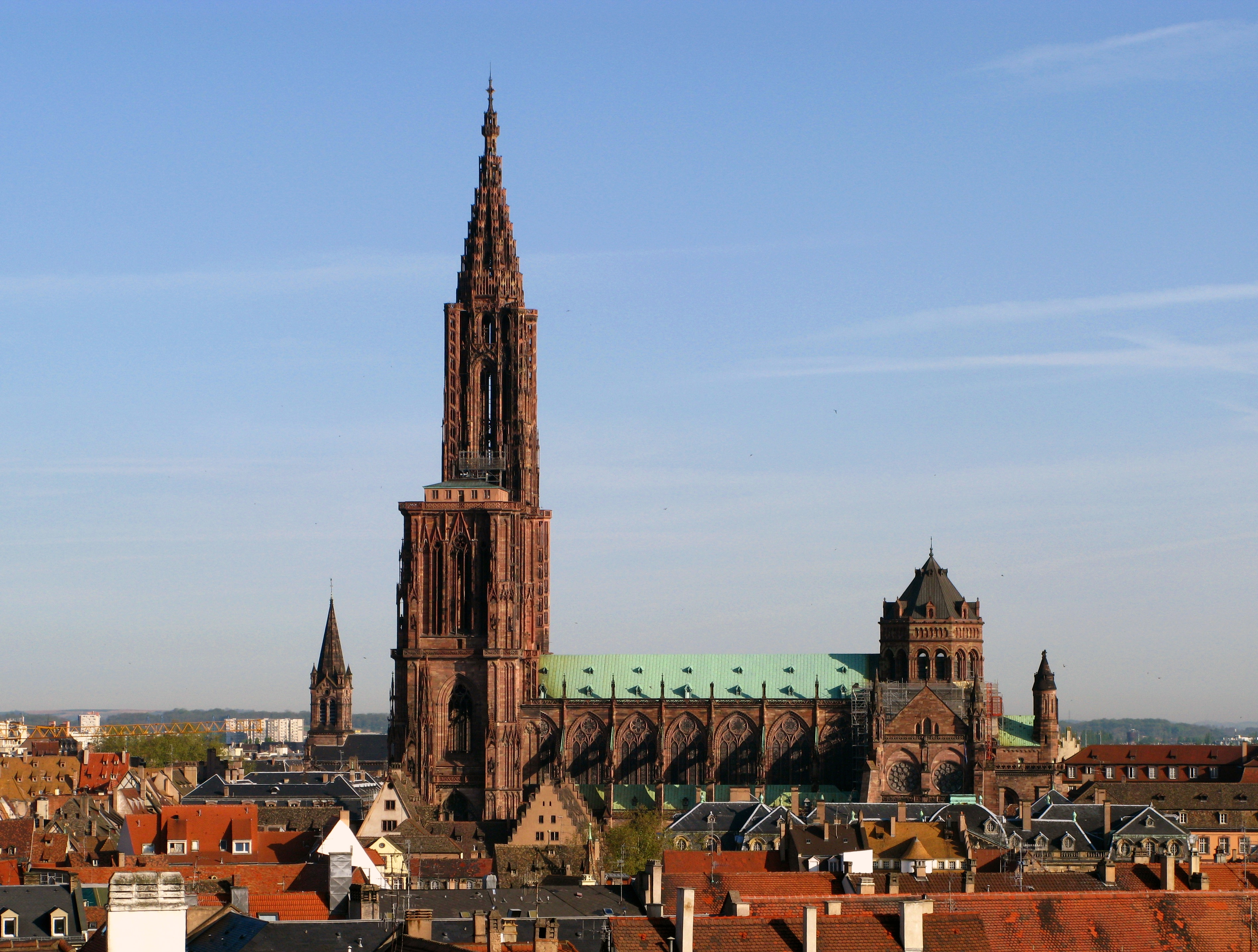
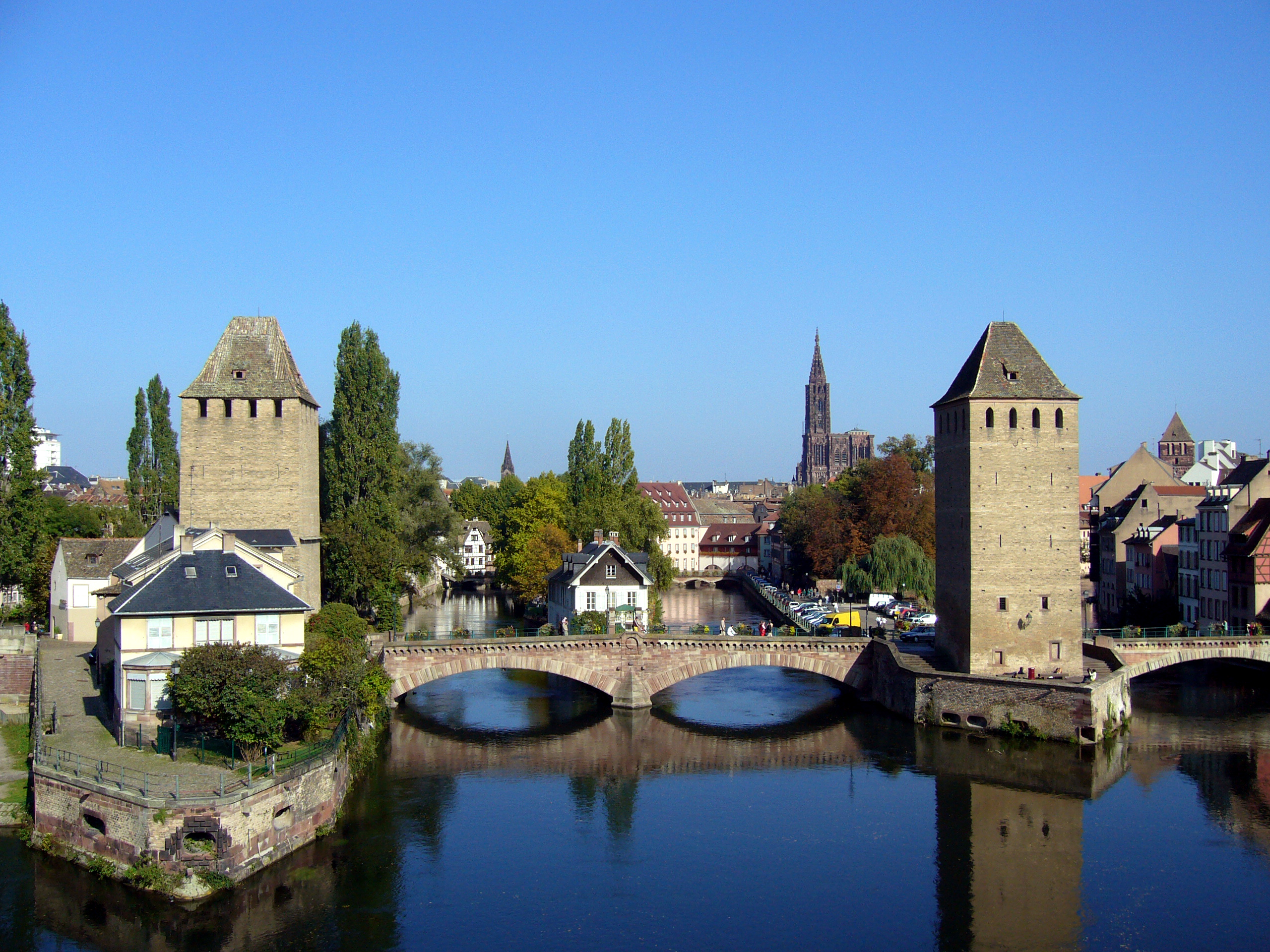
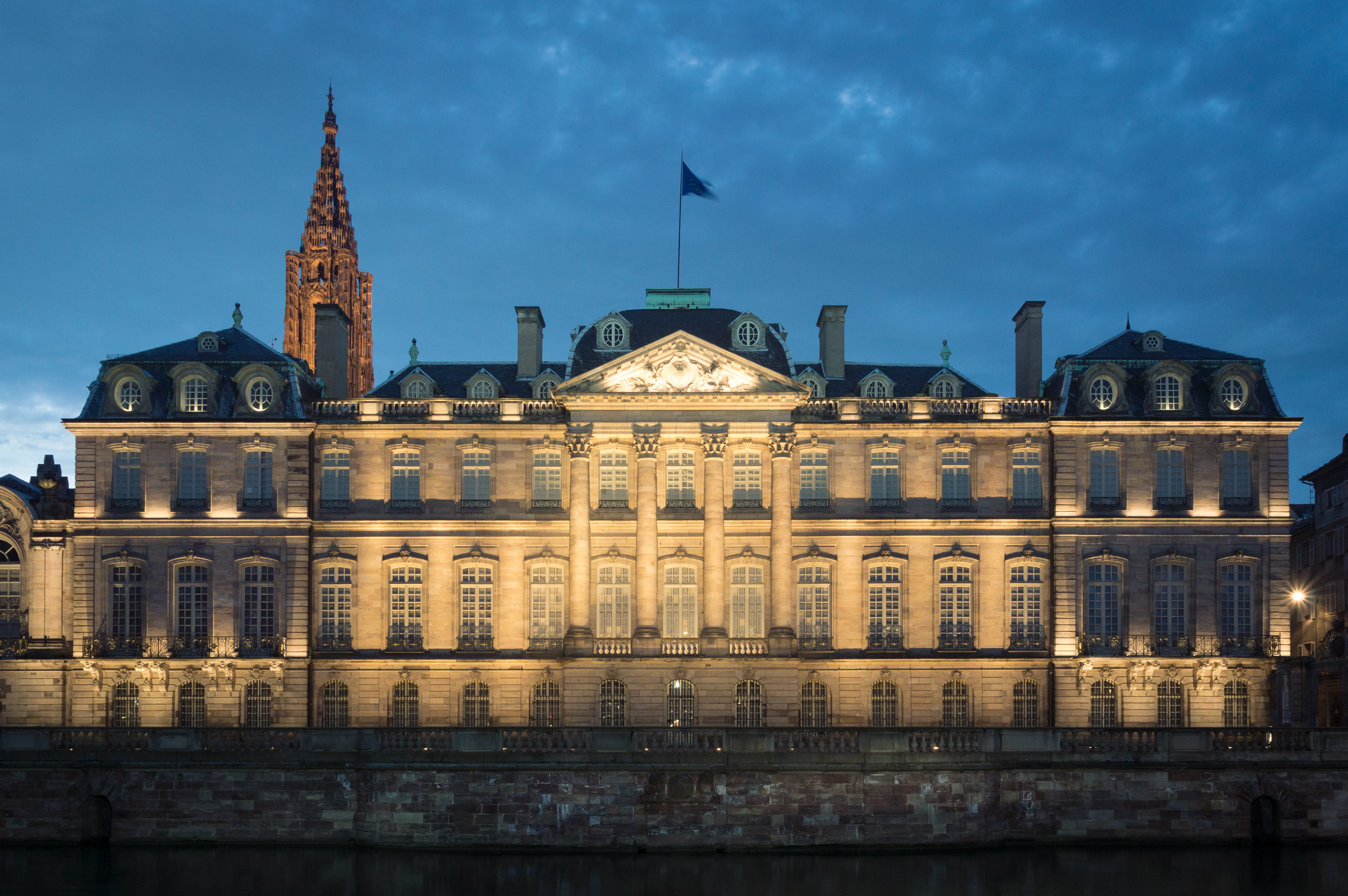
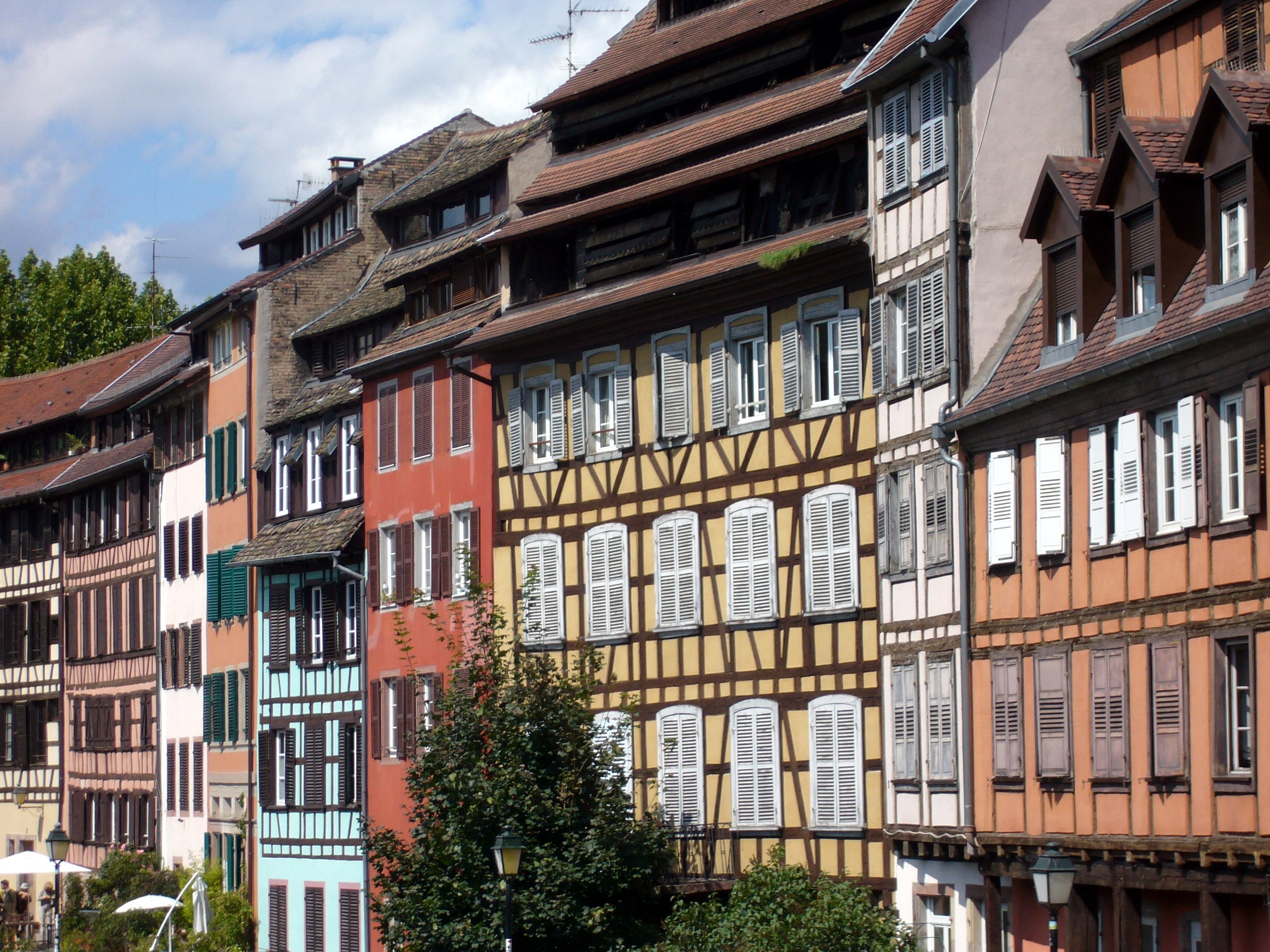
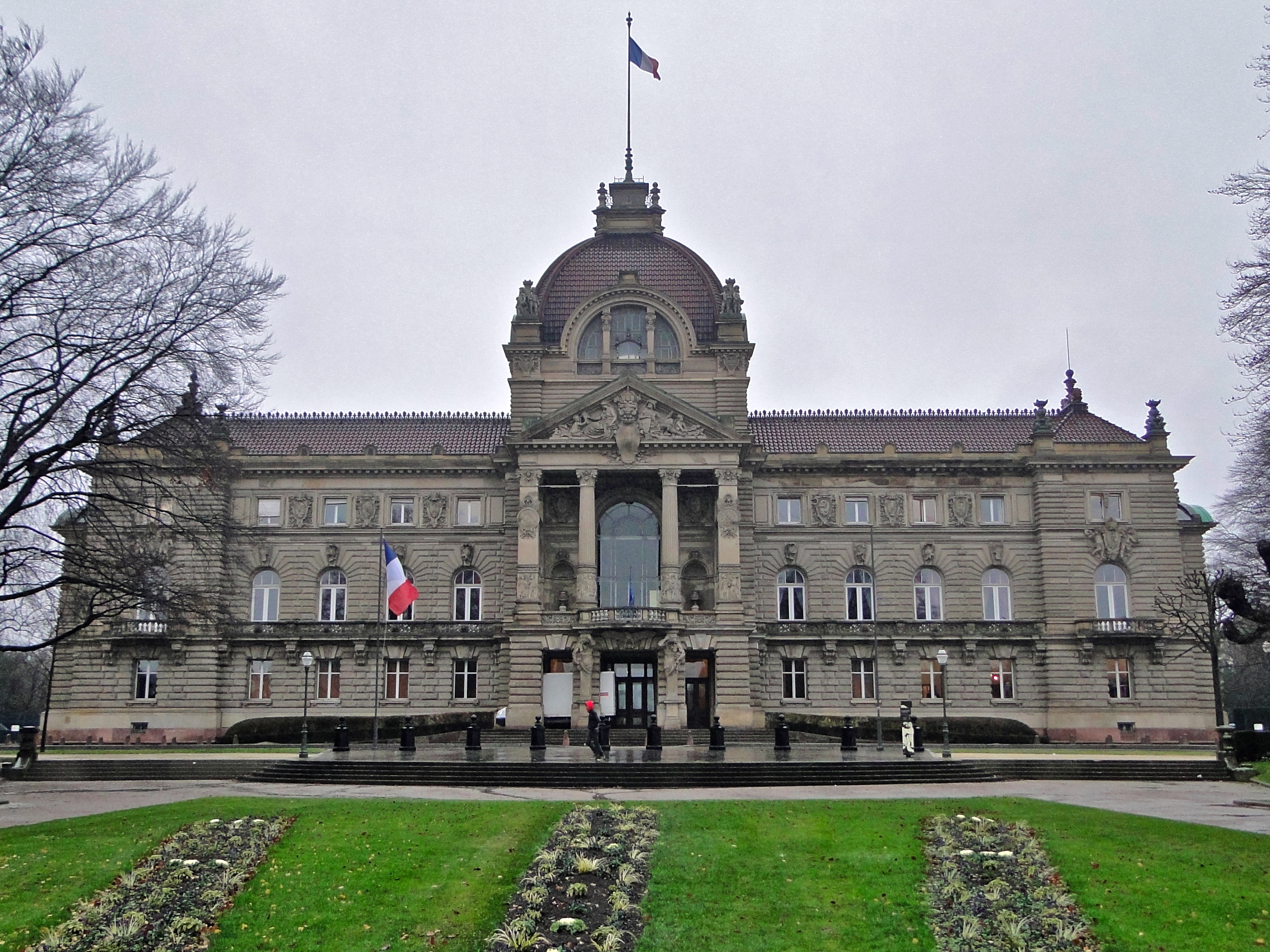
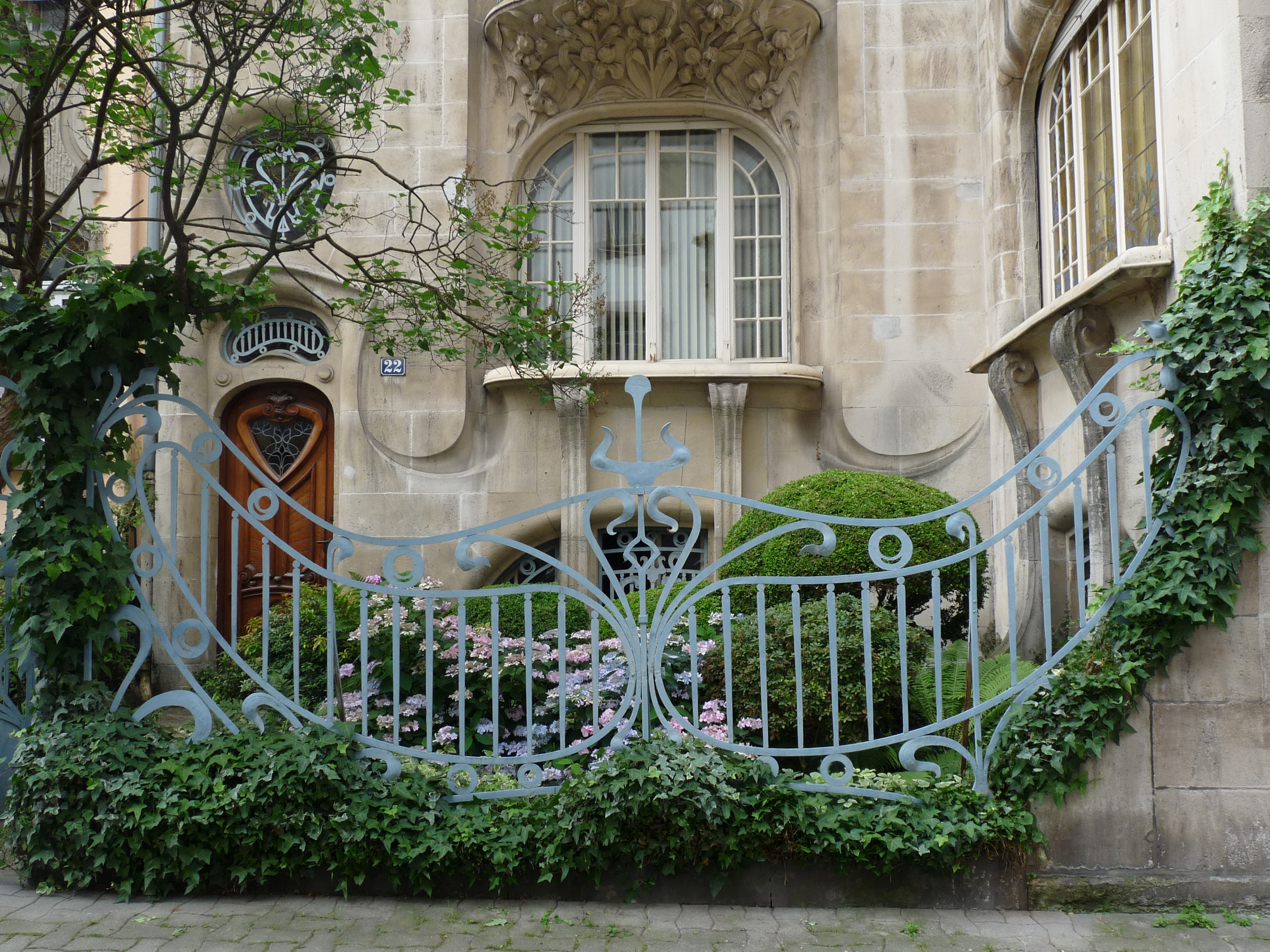
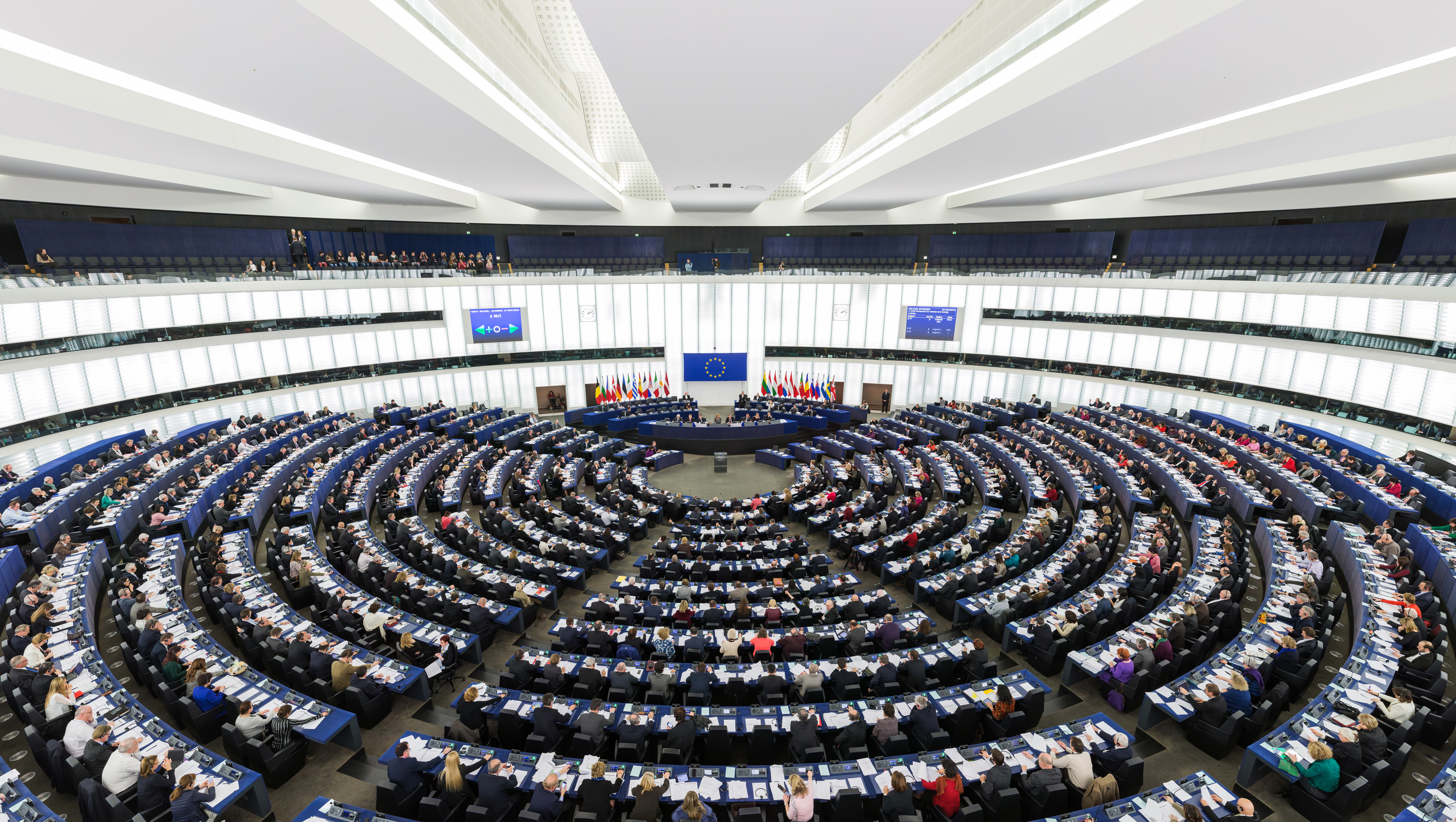
- Strasbourg Cathedral and the Old Town Ponts Couverts Palais Rohan Petite France Palais du Rhin Hôtel Brion Hemicycle of the European Parliament

- Flag Coat of arms
- Location of Strasbourg
- Location within France Location within Grand Est
- Coordinates: 48°35′00″N 07°44′45″E
- Country: France
- Region: Grand Est
- Department: Bas-Rhin
- Arrondissement: Strasbourg
- Canton: 6 cantons
- Intercommunality: Eurométropole de Strasbourg

Government
  - Mayor (2026–32): Catherine Trautmann (Socialist Party (France))
- Area^{1}: 78.26 km^{2} (30.22 sq mi)
  - Urban (2020 (Note: Only the part of the urban area on French territory.)): 240.2 km^{2} (92.7 sq mi)
  - Metro (2020): 2,227.1 km^{2} (859.9 sq mi)
- Highest elevation: 151 m (495 ft)
- Lowest elevation: 132 m (433 ft)
- Population (2023): 293,771
  - Rank: 8th in France
  - Density: 3,754/km^{2} (9,722/sq mi)
  - Urban (2023): 494,536
  - Urban density: 2,059/km^{2} (5,332/sq mi)
  - Metro (2023): 875,163
  - Metro density: 392.96/km^{2} (1,017.8/sq mi)
- Demonym(s): French forms: Strasbourgeois (m.); Strasbourgeoise (f.); English form: Strasburger (Note: Derived from the original German demonyms Straßburger (m.) and Straßburgerin (f.), which are easier for most English speakers to pronounce; alternative adapted forms include Strassburger and Strasbourger.)
- Time zone: UTC+01:00 (CET)
  - Summer (DST): UTC+02:00 (CEST)
- INSEE/Postal code: 67482 /
- Dialling codes: 0388, 0390, 0368
- Website: strasbourg.eu
- ^{1} French Land Register data, which excludes lakes, ponds, glaciers > 1 km^{2} (0.386 sq mi or 247 acres) and river estuaries.

Strasbourg (Note: English: UK: /ˈstræzbɜːrɡ/ STRAZ-burg, US: /ˈstrɑːsbʊərɡ, ˈstrɑːz-, -bɜːrɡ/ STRAHSS-boorg, STRAHZ-, -burg; French: [stʁasbuʁ]; German: Straßburg [ˈʃtʁaːsbʊʁk]; Bas Rhin Alsatian: Strossburi [ˈʃd̥ʁɔːsb̥uʁi]; Haut Rhin Alsatian: Strossburig [ˈʃd̥ʁɔːsb̥uʁiɡ̊].) is a prefecture and commune, and the largest city of the Grand Est region of northeastern France, in the historic region of Alsace. It is the prefecture of the Bas-Rhin department and the official seat of the European Parliament.

In 2023, the city had 294,229 inhabitants, while Greater Strasbourg had a population of 522,596. Strasbourg's metropolitan area had a population of 875,163 the same year, making it the eighth-largest metro area in France and home to 14% of the Grand Est region's inhabitants. The transnational Strasbourg-Ortenau Eurodistrict had a population of roughly 1.02 million in 2020. Strasbourg is one of the de facto three main capitals of the European Union (alongside Brussels and Luxembourg), as it is the seat of several European institutions, such as the European Parliament, the Eurocorps and the European Ombudsman of the European Union. An organization separate from the European Union, the Council of Europe (with its European Court of Human Rights, its European Directorate for the Quality of Medicines most commonly known in French as "Pharmacopée Européenne", and its European Audiovisual Observatory) is also located in the city.

Together with Geneva (United Nations) and New York City (United Nations world headquarters), Strasbourg is among the few cities in the world that are not national capitals and host international organisations of the first order. The city is the seat of many non-European international institutions such as the Central Commission for Navigation on the Rhine and the International Institute of Human Rights. It is the second city in France in terms of international congresses and symposia, after Paris. Strasbourg's historic city centre, the Grande Île (Grand Island), was classified a World Heritage Site by UNESCO in 1988, with the newer "Neustadt" being added to the site in 2017. Strasbourg is immersed in Franco-German culture and although violently disputed throughout history, has been a cultural bridge between France and Germany for centuries, especially through the University of Strasbourg, currently the second largest in France, and the coexistence of Catholic and Protestant culture. It is also home to the largest Islamic place of worship in France, the Strasbourg Grand Mosque.

Economically, Strasbourg is an important centre of manufacturing and engineering, as well as a hub of road, rail and river transportation. The port of Strasbourg is the second largest on the Rhine after Duisburg in Germany, and the second-largest river port in France after Paris.

== Etymology and names ==
Until the fifth century AD, the city was known as Argantorati (in the nominative, Argantorate in the locative), a Celtic Gaulish name Latinised first as Argentorate (with Gaulish locative ending, as appearing on the first Roman milestones in the first century) and then as Argentoratum (with regular Latin nominative ending, in later Latin texts). The Gaulish name is a compound of arganto(n)- (cognate to Latin argentum, which gave modern French argent), the Gaulish word for silver; and -rati, the Gaulish word for fortified enclosures, cognate to the Old Irish ráth (see ringfort). Arganto also referred to any precious metal, particularly gold, which suggests that the settlement began either as a fortified enclosure located by a river gold mining site, or as a hoard of gold mined from the nearby rivers.

After the fifth century the city became known by a completely different name, later Gallicized as Strasbourg (Lower Alsatian: Strossburi; German: Straßburg). That name is of Germanic origin and means 'town (at the crossing) of roads'. The modern Stras- is cognate with the German Straße and English street, both derived from Latin strata ("paved road"), while -bourg is cognate with the German Burg and English borough, both derived from Proto-Germanic *burgz ("hill fort, fortress").

Gregory of Tours was the first to mention the name change: in the tenth book of his History of the Franks written shortly after 590 he said that Egidius, Bishop of Reims, accused of plotting against King Childebert II of Austrasia in favor of his uncle King Chilperic I of Neustria, was tried by a synod of Austrasian bishops in Metz in November 590, found guilty and removed from the priesthood, then taken "ad Argentoratensem urbem, quam nunc Strateburgum vocant" ("to the city of Argentoratum, which they now call Strateburgus"), where he was exiled.

== History ==
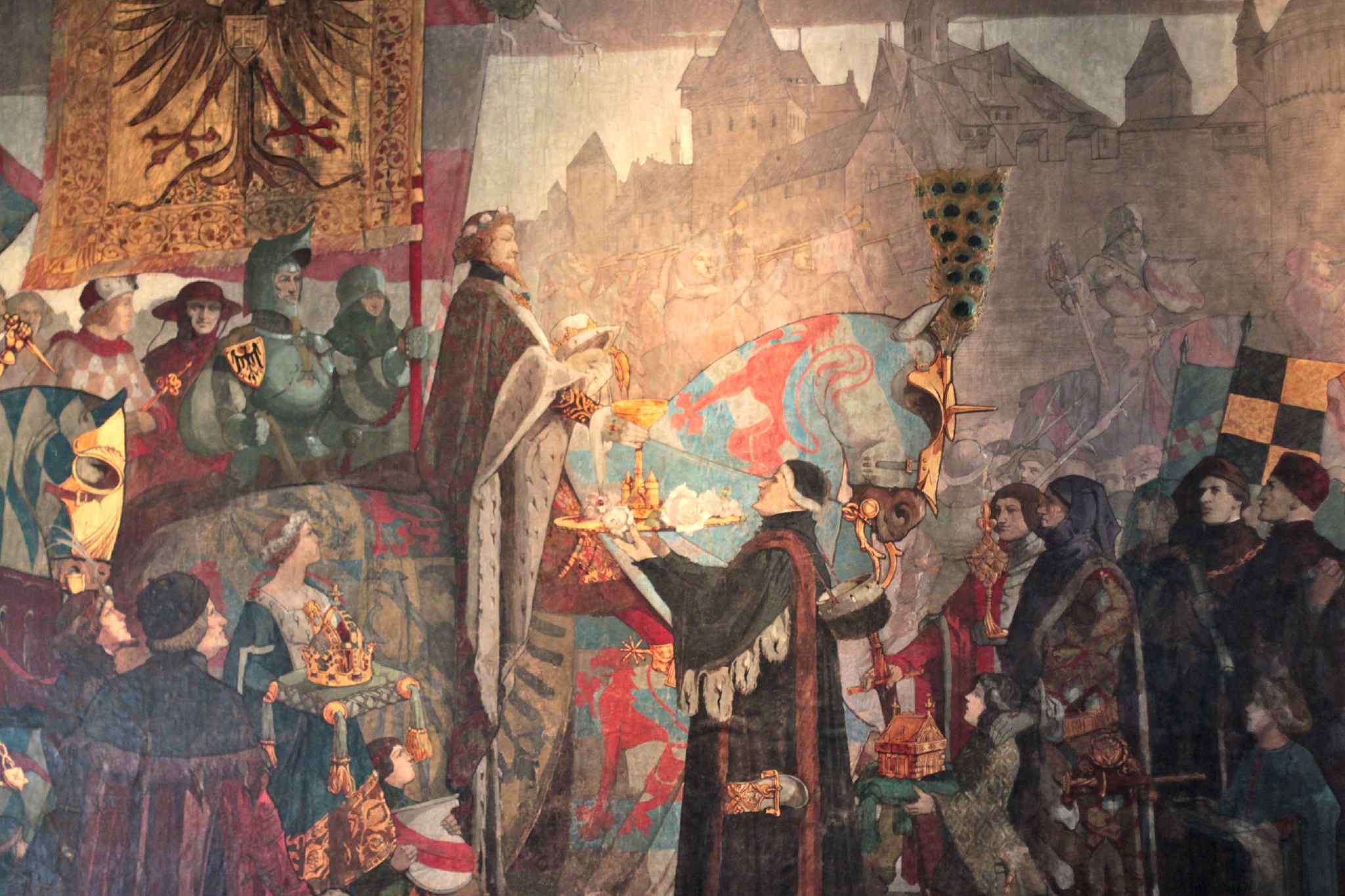
Sigismund, Holy Roman Emperor visiting Strasbourg in 1414, detail of a painting by Léo Schnug

The Roman camp of Argentoratum was first mentioned in 12 BC; the city of Strasbourg which grew from it celebrated its 2,000th anniversary in 1988. The fertile area in the Upper Rhine Plain between the rivers Ill and Rhine had already been populated since the Middle Paleolithic.

Between 362 and 1262, Strasbourg was governed by the bishops of Strasbourg; their rule was reinforced in 873 and then more in 982. In 1262, the citizens violently rebelled against the bishop's rule (Battle of Hausbergen) and Strasbourg became a free imperial city. It became a French city in 1681, after the conquest of Alsace by the armies of Louis XIV. In 1871, after the Franco-Prussian War, the city, as part of the Imperial Territory of Alsace–Lorraine, became German again, until 1918 (end of World War I), when it reverted to France. Strasbourg was captured by the German army in June 1940 at the end of the Battle of France (World War II), and subsequently came under German control again through formal annexation into the Gau Baden-Elsaß under the Nazi Gauleiter Robert Wagner; since the liberation of the city by the 2nd French Armoured Division under General Leclerc in November 1944, it has again been a French city. In 2016, Strasbourg was promoted from capital of Alsace to capital of Grand Est.

Strasbourg played an important part in the Protestant Reformation, with personalities such as John Calvin, Martin Bucer, Wolfgang Capito, Matthew and Katharina Zell, but also in other aspects of Christianity such as German mysticism, with Johannes Tauler, Pietism, with Philipp Spener, and Reverence for Life, with Albert Schweitzer. Delegates from the city took part in the Protestation at Speyer. It was also one of the first centres of the printing industry with pioneers such as Johannes Gutenberg, Johannes Mentelin and Heinrich Eggestein. Among the darkest periods in the city's long history were the years 1349 (Strasbourg massacre), 1518 (Dancing plague), 1793 (Reign of Terror), 1870 (Siege of Strasbourg) and the years 1940–1944 with the Nazi occupation (atrocities such as the Jewish skull collection) and the British and American bombing raids. Some other notable dates were the years 357 (Battle of Argentoratum), 842 (Oaths of Strasbourg), 1538 (establishment of the university), 1605 (world's first newspaper printed by Johann Carolus), 1792 (La Marseillaise) and 1889 (pancreatic origin of diabetes discovered by Minkowski and Von Mering).

Strasbourg has been the seat of European institutions since 1949: first of the International Commission on Civil Status and of the Council of Europe, later of the European Parliament, of the European Science Foundation, of Eurocorps, and others as well.

== Geography ==
=== Location ===
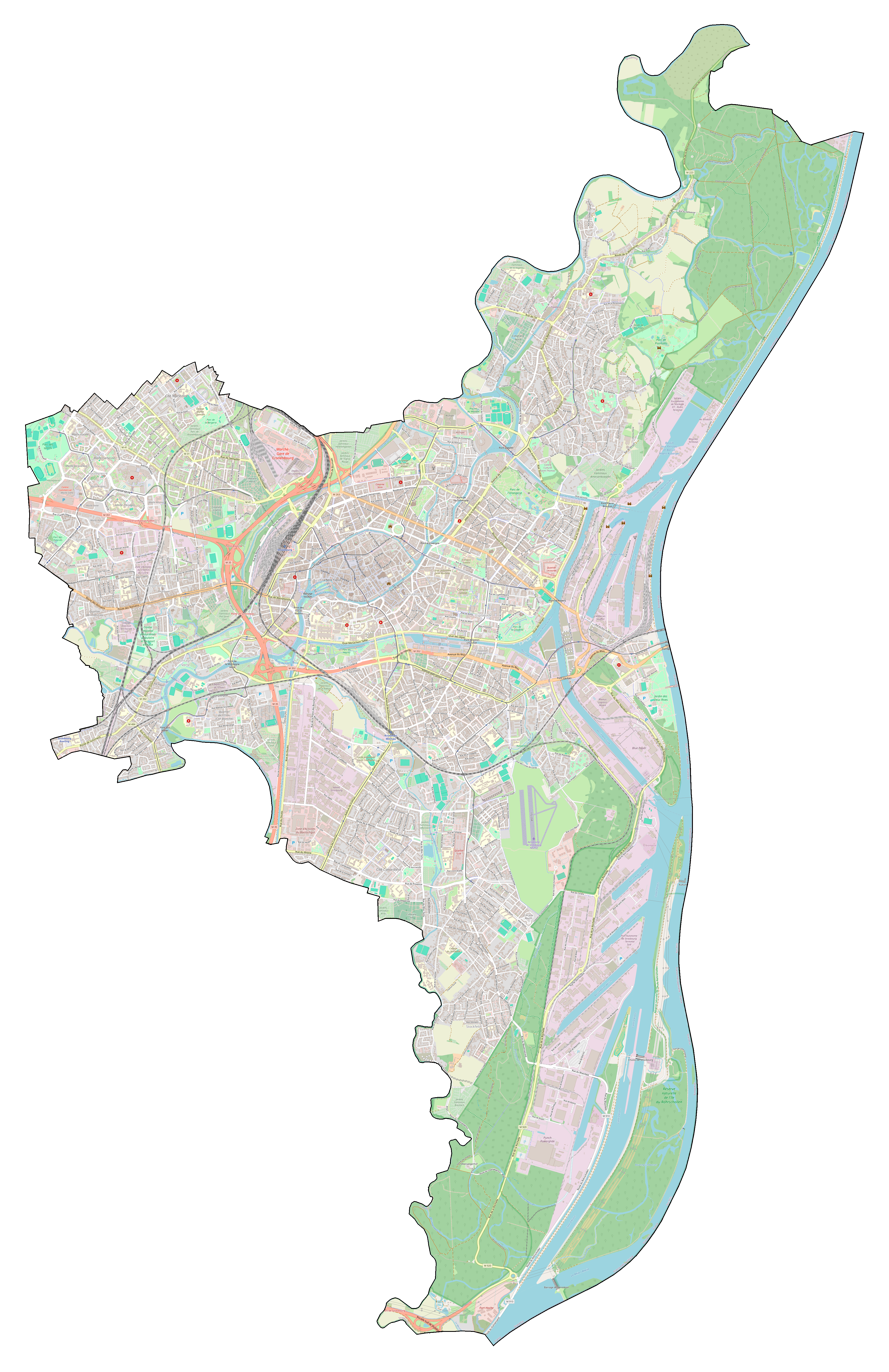
Detailed OSM map of Strasbourg.

Strasbourg is situated at the eastern border of France with Germany. This border is formed by the Rhine, which also forms the eastern border of the modern city, facing across the river to the German town Kehl. The historic core of Strasbourg, however, lies on the Grande Île in the river Ill, which here flows parallel to, and roughly 4 km (2.5 mi) from, the Rhine. The natural courses of the two rivers eventually join some distance downstream of Strasbourg, although several artificial waterways now connect them within the city.

The city lies in the Upper Rhine Plain, at between 132 and 151 metres (433 and 495 ft) above sea level, with the upland areas of the Vosges Mountains some 20 km (12 mi) to the west and the Black Forest 25 km (16 mi) to the east. This section of the Rhine valley is a major axis of north–south travel, with river traffic on the Rhine itself, and major roads and railways paralleling it on both banks.

The city is some 397 km (247 mi) east of Paris. The mouth of the Rhine lies approximately 450 km (280 mi) to the north, or 650 km (400 mi) as the river flows, whilst the head of navigation in Basel is some 100 km (62 mi) to the south, or 150 km (93 mi) by river.

=== Climate ===
The climate in Strasbourg has changed over the past decades, and while it retains an oceanic climate (Cfb in the Köppen classification), it is increasingly resembling a humid subtropical climate (Köppen Cfa), with certain continental influences. Winters are cool and variable, with short periods of very cold weather. Snow is rare, but frost is common. Summers are hot, punctuated by heat waves, and rainfall is low throughout the year despite 101 days of rain annually.

Strasbourg's location in the Rhine valley, sheltered from strong winds by the Vosges and Black Forest mountains, results in poor natural ventilation, making Strasbourg one of the most atmospherically polluted cities of France. Nonetheless, the progressive disappearance of heavy industry on both banks of the Rhine, as well as effective measures of traffic regulation in and around the city have reduced air pollution in recent years.

Climate data for Strasbourg – Entzheim (SXB), elevation: 150 m (492 ft) (1991–2020 normals, extremes 1923–present)
Month	Jan	Feb	Mar	Apr	May	Jun	Jul	Aug	Sep	Oct	Nov	Dec	Year
Record high °C (°F)	17.6 (63.7)	21.2 (70.2)	26.3 (79.3)	30.0 (86.0)	34.6 (94.3)	40.4 (104.7)	38.9 (102.0)	38.7 (101.7)	35.1 (95.2)	31.0 (87.8)	22.1 (71.8)	18.6 (65.5)	40.4 (104.7)
Mean daily maximum °C (°F)	5.2 (41.4)	7.3 (45.1)	12.1 (53.8)	17.0 (62.6)	20.9 (69.6)	24.4 (75.9)	26.4 (79.5)	26.1 (79.0)	21.6 (70.9)	15.8 (60.4)	9.4 (48.9)	5.9 (42.6)	16.0 (60.8)
Daily mean °C (°F)	2.5 (36.5)	3.6 (38.5)	7.4 (45.3)	11.3 (52.3)	15.5 (59.9)	18.9 (66.0)	20.6 (69.1)	20.3 (68.5)	16.1 (61.0)	11.5 (52.7)	6.3 (43.3)	3.3 (37.9)	11.4 (52.5)
Mean daily minimum °C (°F)	−0.2 (31.6)	0.0 (32.0)	2.6 (36.7)	5.7 (42.3)	10.1 (50.2)	13.4 (56.1)	14.9 (58.8)	14.5 (58.1)	10.7 (51.3)	7.2 (45.0)	3.3 (37.9)	0.8 (33.4)	6.9 (44.4)
Record low °C (°F)	−23.6 (−10.5)	−22.3 (−8.1)	−16.7 (1.9)	−5.6 (21.9)	−2.4 (27.7)	1.0 (33.8)	4.9 (40.8)	3.2 (37.8)	−1.3 (29.7)	−7.6 (18.3)	−10.8 (12.6)	−23.4 (−10.1)	−23.6 (−10.5)
Average precipitation mm (inches)	35.4 (1.39)	34.1 (1.34)	38.6 (1.52)	41.8 (1.65)	77.2 (3.04)	68.5 (2.70)	71.9 (2.83)	61.3 (2.41)	54.6 (2.15)	59.5 (2.34)	47.6 (1.87)	45.2 (1.78)	635.7 (25.03)
Average precipitation days (≥ 1.0 mm)	9.1	8.3	8.5	8.6	10.8	10.2	10.4	9.5	8.0	9.6	9.2	10.2	112.3
Average snowy days	7.0	6.7	3.3	0.7	0.0	0.0	0.0	0.0	0.0	0.1	2.2	6.0	25.9
Average relative humidity (%)	86	80	72	66	68	68	68	71	76	83	88	87	76
Average dew point °C (°F)	0 (32)	0 (32)	2 (36)	4 (39)	9 (48)	13 (55)	14 (57)	14 (57)	11 (52)	8 (46)	4 (39)	1 (34)	7 (44)
Mean monthly sunshine hours	55.5	85.8	146.4	186.9	209.1	226.4	239.7	224.2	173.5	100.4	55.2	44.2	1,747.3
Source 1: Meteociel (snowy days 1981–2010)
Source 2: Time and Date

== Districts ==
Strasbourg is divided into the following districts:

1. Bourse, Esplanade, Krutenau
2. Centre Ville (Downtown Strasbourg)
3. Gare, Tribunal (Central Station, Court)
4. Conseil des XV, Orangerie
5. Cronenbourg
6. Hautepierre, Poteries
7. Koenigshoffen,
8. Montagne-Verte (Green Hill)
9. Elsau
10. Meinau
11. Neudorf-Musau
12. Neuhof 1 (including Ganzau)
13. Neuhof 2
14. Robertsau
15. Port du Rhin (Rhine's Harbor)

== Main sights ==
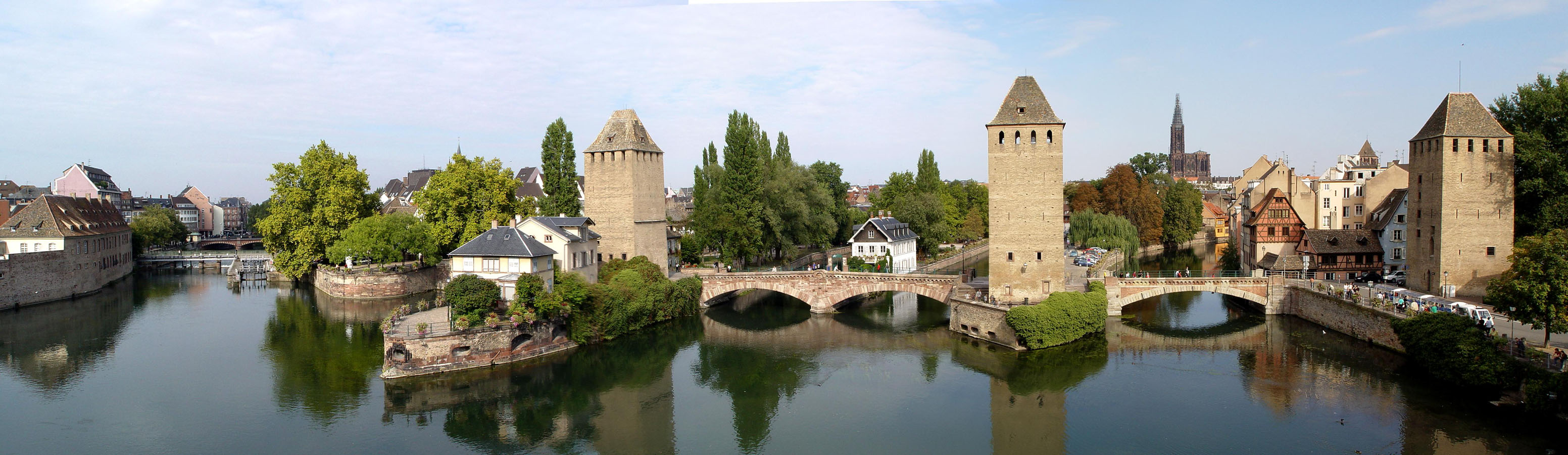
Panorama from the Barrage Vauban with the medieval bridge Ponts Couverts in the foreground (the fourth tower is hidden by trees at the left) and the cathedral in the distance on the right

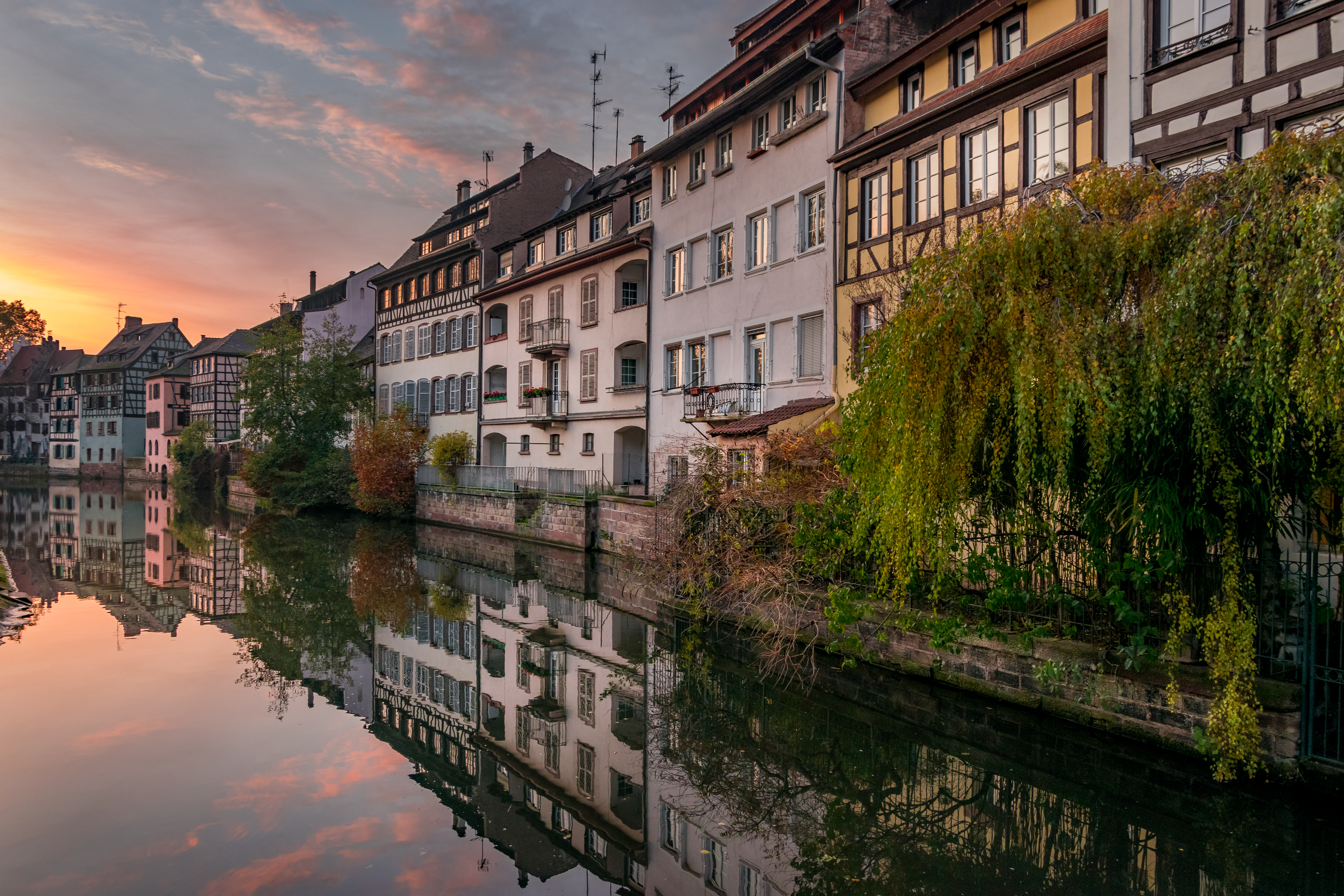
La Petite France during golden hour

=== Architecture ===
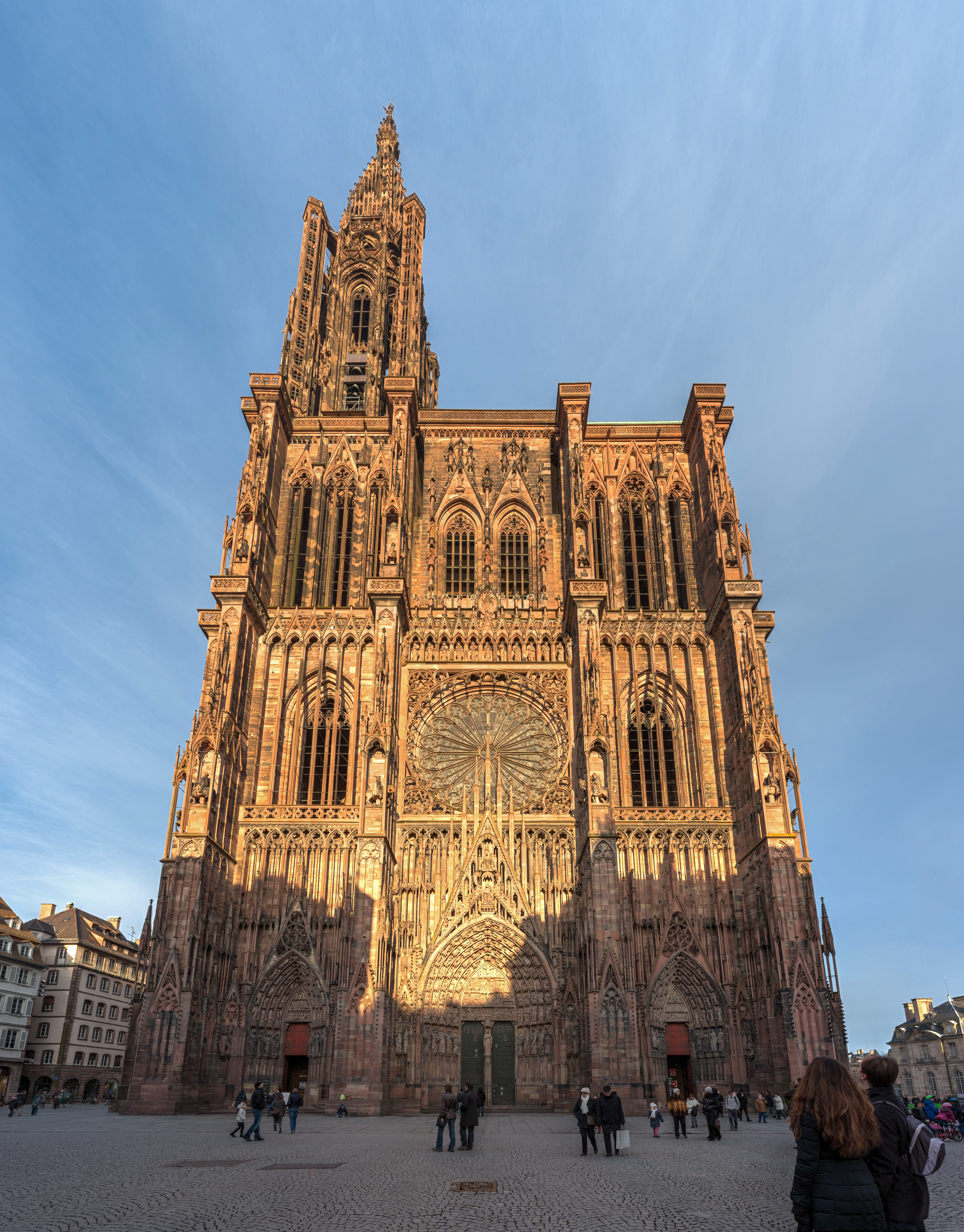
Strasbourg, Cathedral of Our Lady

The city is chiefly known for its sandstone Gothic Cathedral with its famous astronomical clock, and for its medieval cityscape of Rhineland black and white timber-framed buildings, particularly in the Petite France district or Gerberviertel ("tanners' district") alongside the Ill and in the streets and squares surrounding the cathedral, where the renowned Maison Kammerzell stands out.

Notable medieval streets include Rue Mercière, Rue des Dentelles, Rue du Bain aux Plantes, Rue des Juifs, Rue des Frères, Rue des Tonneliers, Rue du Maroquin, Rue des Charpentiers, Rue des Serruriers, Grand' Rue, Quai des Bateliers, Quai Saint-Nicolas and Quai Saint-Thomas. Notable medieval squares include Place de la Cathédrale, Place du Marché Gayot, Place Saint-Étienne, Place du Marché aux Cochons de Lait and Place Benjamin Zix.

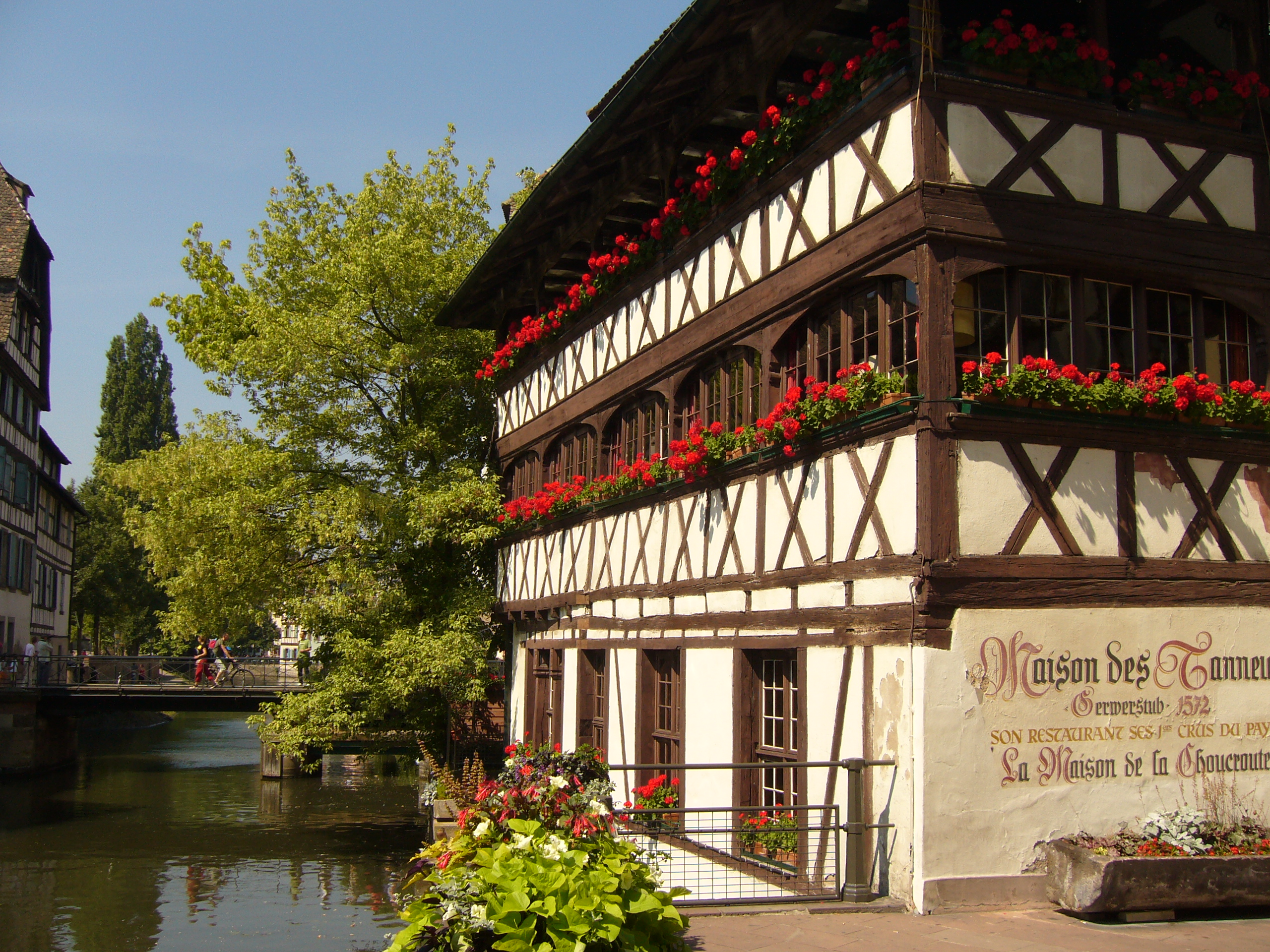
Maison des tanneurs

In addition to the cathedral, Strasbourg houses several other medieval churches that have survived the many wars and destructions that have plagued the city: the Romanesque Église Saint-Étienne, partly destroyed in 1944 by Allied bombing raids; the part-Romanesque, part-Gothic, very large Église Saint-Thomas with its Silbermann organ on which Wolfgang Amadeus Mozart and Albert Schweitzer played; the Gothic Église protestante Saint-Pierre-le-Jeune with its crypt dating back to the seventh century and its cloister partly from the eleventh century; the Gothic Église Saint-Guillaume with its fine early-Renaissance stained glass and furniture; the Gothic Église Saint-Jean; the part-Gothic, part-Art Nouveau Église Sainte-Madeleine etc. The Neo-Gothic church Saint-Pierre-le-Vieux Catholique (there is also an adjacent church Saint-Pierre-le-Vieux Protestant) serves as a shrine for several 15th-century wood-worked and painted altars coming from other, now destroyed churches and installed there for public display; especially the Passion of Christ. Among the numerous secular medieval buildings, the monumental Ancienne Douane (old custom-house) stands out.

The German Renaissance has bequeathed the city some noteworthy buildings (especially the current Chambre de commerce et d'industrie, former town hall, on Place Gutenberg), as did the French Baroque and Classicism with several hôtels particuliers (i.e. palaces), among which the Palais Rohan (completed 1742, used for university purposes from 1872 to 1895, now housing three museums) is the most spectacular. Other buildings of its kind are the "Hôtel de Hanau" (1736, now the city hall); the Hôtel de Klinglin (1736, now residence of the préfet); the Hôtel des Deux-Ponts (1755, now residence of the military governor); the Hôtel d'Andlau-Klinglin (1725, now seat of the administration of the Port autonome de Strasbourg) etc. The largest baroque building of Strasbourg though is the 150-metre-long (490 ft) 1720s main building of the Hôpital civil. As for French Neo-classicism, it is the Opera House on Place Broglie that most prestigiously represents this style.

Strasbourg also has eclecticist buildings in its extended German district, the Neustadt, which is a memory of Wilhelmian architecture since most of the major cities in Germany proper suffered intensive damage during World War II. Streets, boulevards and avenues are homogeneous, high (up to seven stories) and broad examples of German urban lay-out and of this architectural style that mixes five centuries of European architecture as well as Neo-Egyptian, Neo-Greek and Neo-Babylonian styles. The former imperial palace Palais du Rhin, the most political and thus heavily criticized of all German Strasbourg buildings, represents the scale and stylistic character of this period. The two most structurally complex buildings of these times are the École internationale des Pontonniers (the former Höhere Mädchenschule, with its towers, turrets and multiple round and square angles) and the Haute école des arts du Rhin with its ornate façade of painted bricks, woodwork and majolica.

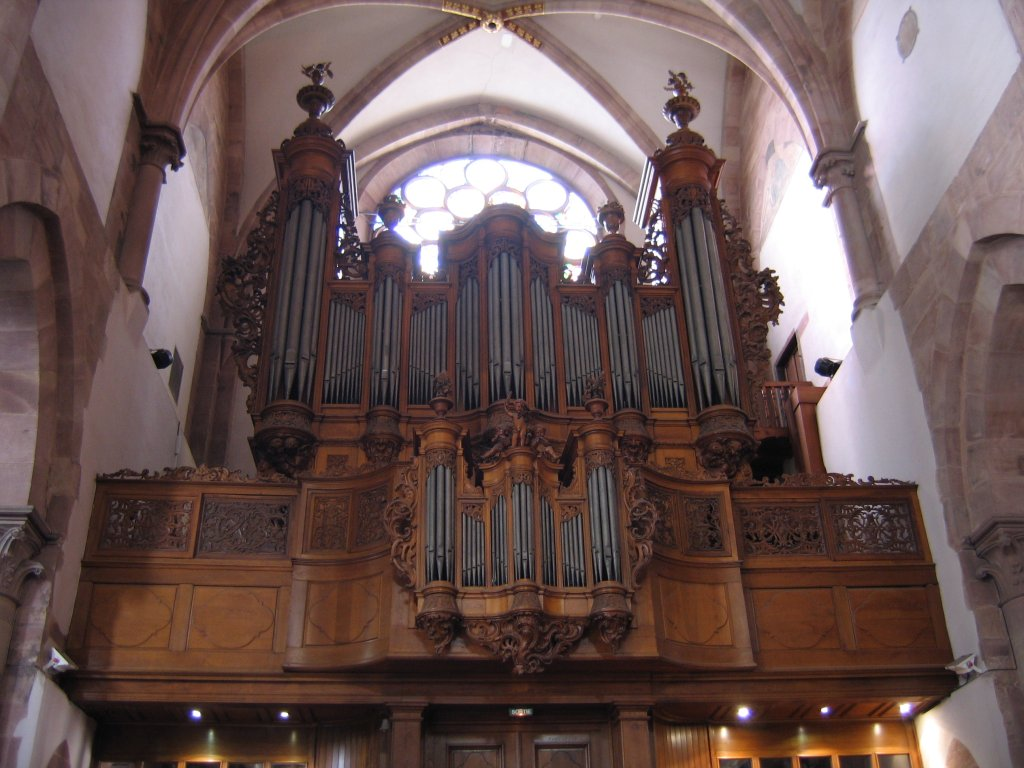
The baroque organ of the Église Saint-Thomas

Notable streets of the German district include: Avenue de la Forêt Noire, Avenue des Vosges, Avenue d'Alsace, Avenue de la Marseillaise, Avenue de la Liberté, Boulevard de la Victoire, Rue Sellénick, Rue du Général de Castelnau, Rue du Maréchal Foch and Rue du Maréchal Joffre. Notable squares of the German district include Place de la République, Place de l'Université, Place Brant and Place Arnold.

Impressive examples of Prussian military architecture of the 1880s can be found along the newly reopened Rue du Rempart, displaying large-scale fortifications among which the aptly named Kriegstor (war gate).

As for modern and contemporary architecture, Strasbourg possesses Art Nouveau buildings (such as the huge Palais des Fêtes and houses and villas like Villa Schutzenberger and Hôtel Brion), examples of post-World War II functional architecture (the Cité Rotterdam, for which Le Corbusier did not succeed in the architectural contest) and, in the very extended Quartier Européen, large administrative buildings including the European Court of Human Rights building by Richard Rogers. Other notable contemporary buildings are the new Music school Cité de la Musique et de la Danse, the Musée d'Art moderne et contemporain and the Hôtel du Département facing it, as well as, in the outskirts, the tramway-station Hoenheim-Nord designed by Zaha Hadid.

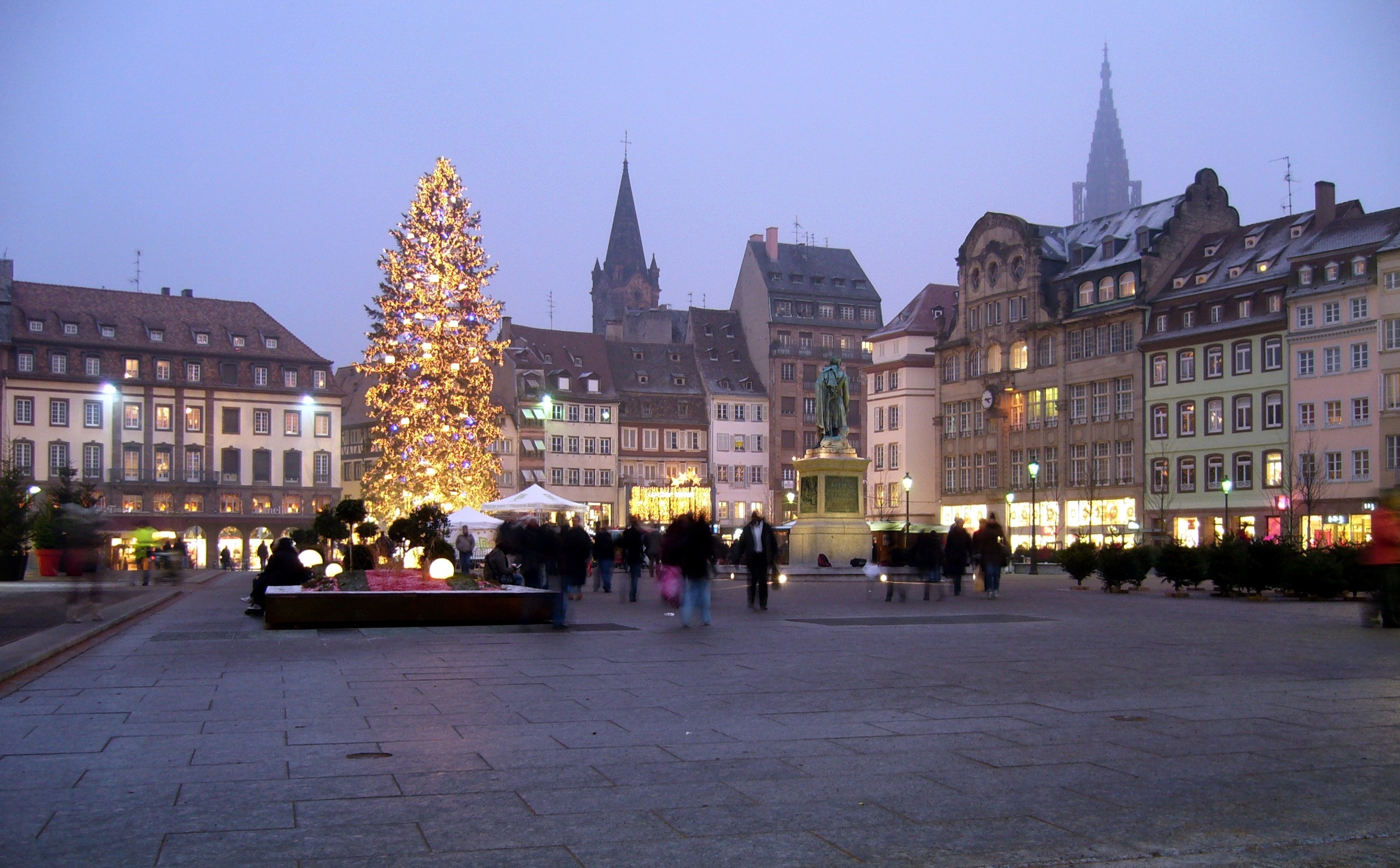
Place Kléber

The city has many bridges, including the medieval and four-towered Ponts Couverts that, despite their name, are no longer covered. Next to the Ponts Couverts is the Barrage Vauban, a part of Vauban's 17th-century fortifications, that does include a covered bridge. Other bridges are the ornate 19th-century Pont de la Fonderie (1893, stone) and Pont d'Auvergne (1892, iron), as well as architect Marc Mimram's futuristic Passerelle over the Rhine, opened in 2004.

The largest square at the centre of the city of Strasbourg is the Place Kléber. Located in the heart of the city's commercial area, it was named after general Jean-Baptiste Kléber, born in Strasbourg in 1753 and assassinated in 1800 in Cairo. In the square is a statue of Kléber, under which is a vault containing his remains. On the north side of the square is the Aubette (Orderly Room), built by Jacques François Blondel, architect of the king, in 1765–1772.

=== Parks ===
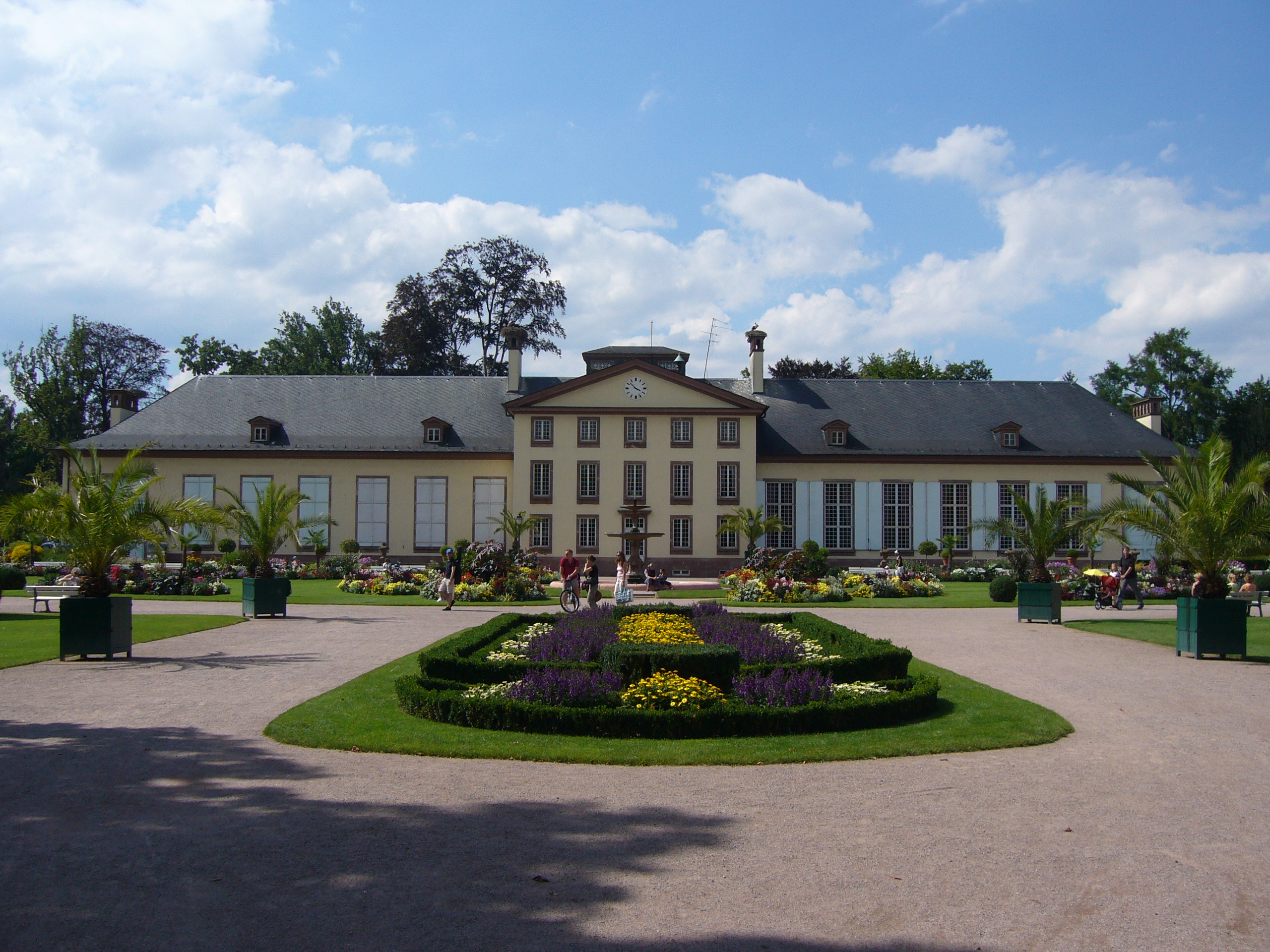
The Pavillon Joséphine (rear side) in the Parc de l'Orangerie

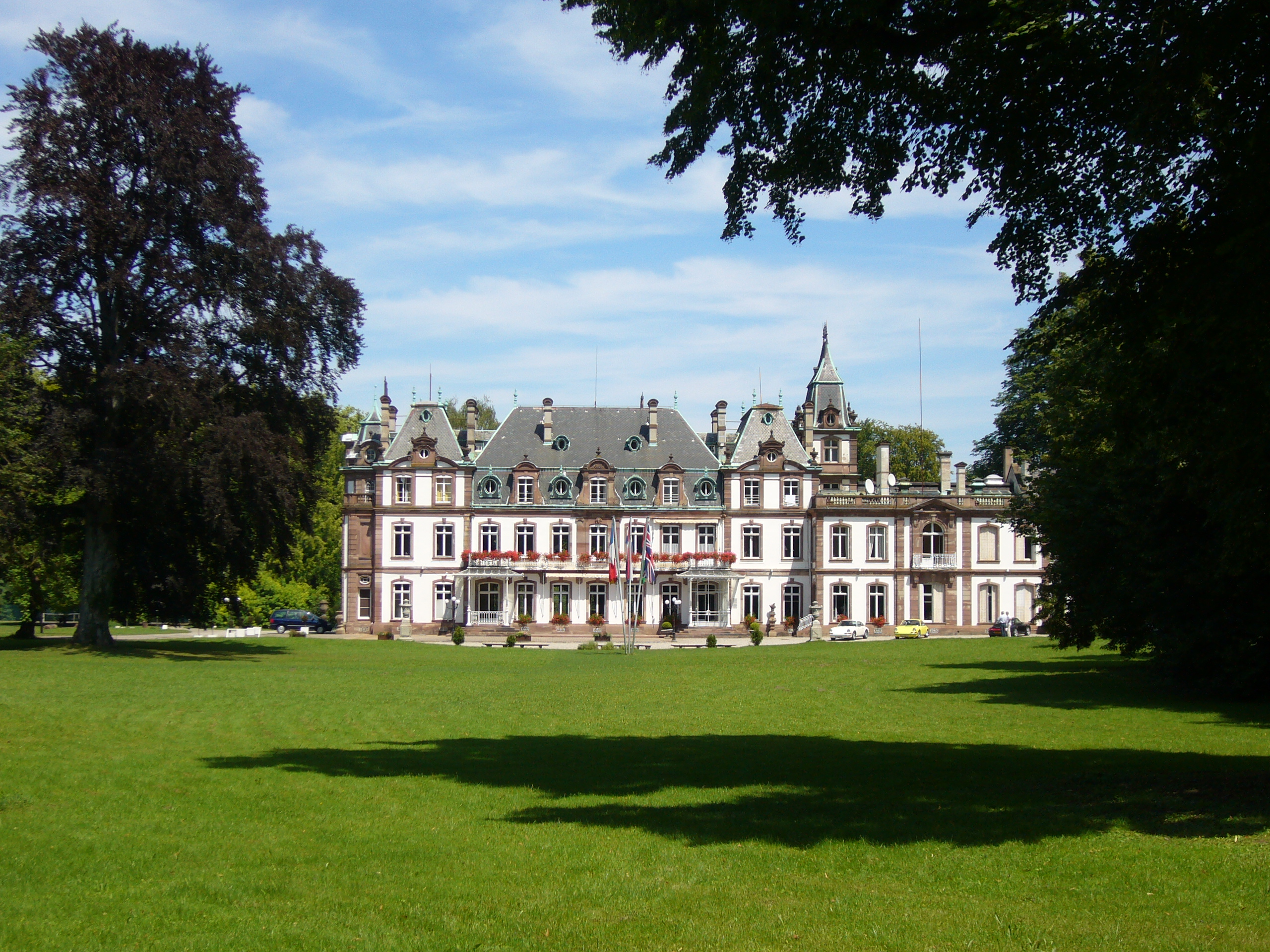
The Château de Pourtalès (front side) in the park of the same name

Strasbourg features a number of prominent parks, of which several are of cultural and historical interest: the Parc de l'Orangerie, laid out as a French garden by André le Nôtre and remodeled as an English garden on behalf of Joséphine de Beauharnais, now displaying noteworthy French gardens, a neo-classical castle and a small zoo; the Parc de la Citadelle, built around impressive remains of the 17th-century fortress erected close to the Rhine by Vauban; the Parc de Pourtalès, laid out in English style around a baroque castle (heavily restored in the 19th century) that now houses a small three-star hotel, and featuring an open-air museum of international contemporary sculpture. The Jardin botanique de l'Université de Strasbourg (botanical garden) was created under the German administration next to the Observatory of Strasbourg, built in 1881, and still owns some greenhouses of those times. The Parc des Contades, although the oldest park of the city, was completely remodeled after World War II. The futuristic Parc des Poteries is an example of European park-conception in the late 1990s. The Jardin des deux Rives, spread over Strasbourg and Kehl on both sides of the Rhine opened in 2004 and is the most extended (60-hectare) park of the agglomeration. The most recent park is Parc du Heyritz (8,7 ha), opened in 2014 along a canal facing the hôpital civil.

=== Museums ===
As of 2020, the city of Strasbourg has eleven municipal museums (including Aubette 1928), eleven university museums, and at least two privately owned museums (Musée vodou and Musée du barreau de Strasbourg). Five communes in the metropolitan area also have museums (see below), three of them dedicated to military history.

==== Overview ====
The collections in Strasbourg are distributed over a wide range of museums, according to a system that takes into account not only the types and geographical provenances of the items, but also the epochs. This concerns in particular the following domains:

- Old Master paintings from the Germanic Rhenish territories and until 1681 are displayed in the Musée de l'Œuvre Notre-Dame (MOND); old master paintings from all the rest of Europe (including the Dutch Rhenish territories) and until 1871, as well as old master paintings from the Germanic Rhenish territories between 1681 and 1871, are displayed in the Musée des Beaux-Arts; paintings since 1871 are displayed in the Musée d'art moderne et contemporain (MAMCS).
- Decorative arts until 1681 are on display in the MOND, decorative arts from the years 1681 until 1871 are on display in the Musée des arts décoratifs, decorative arts after 1871 are on display at the MAMCS, with items from each epoch also shown in the Musée historique.
- Prints and drawings until 1871 are displayed in the Cabinet des estampes et dessins, save for the original plans of Strasbourg Cathedral, displayed in the MOND. Prints and drawings after 1871 are displayed in the MAMCS, and in the Musée Tomi Ungerer/Centre international de l'illustration (the combined number of prints and drawings amounts to well over 200,000).
- Artefacts from Ancient Egypt are on display in two entirely different collections, one in the Musée archéologique and the other belonging to the Instituts d'Égyptologie et de Papyrologie of the University of Strasbourg.

==== Fine-art museums ====
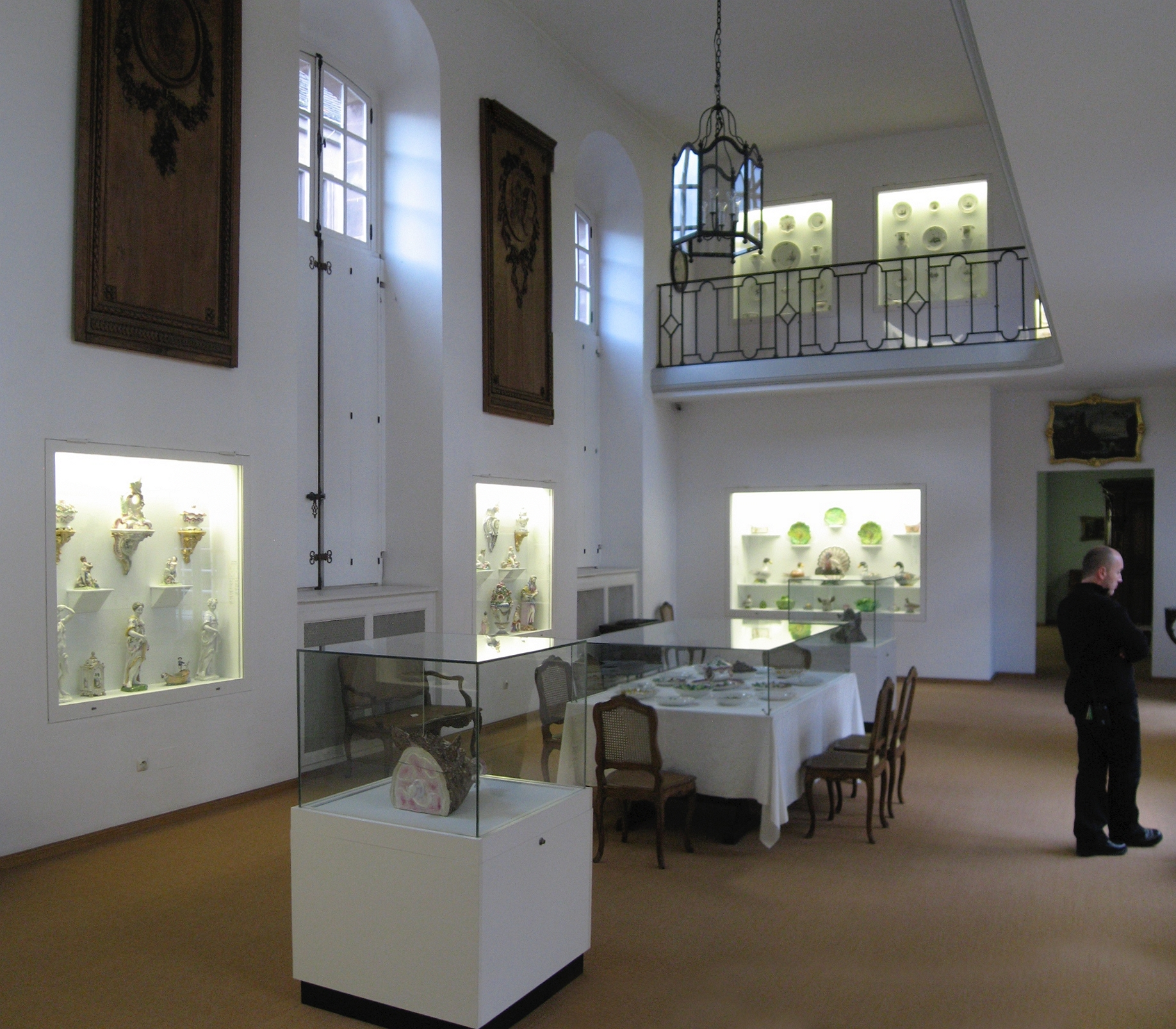
A room in the Musée des Arts décoratifs

- The Musée des Beaux-Arts owns paintings by Hans Memling, Francisco de Goya, Tintoretto, Paolo Veronese, Giotto di Bondone, Sandro Botticelli, Peter Paul Rubens, Anthony van Dyck, El Greco, Correggio, Cima da Conegliano and Piero di Cosimo, among others.
- The Musée de l'Œuvre Notre-Dame (located in a part-Gothic, part-Renaissance building next to the cathedral) houses a large and renowned collection of medieval and Renaissance upper-Rhenish art, among which original sculptures, plans and stained glass from the cathedral and paintings by Hans Baldung and Sebastian Stoskopff.
- The Musée d'Art moderne et contemporain is among the largest museums of its kind in France.
- The Musée des Arts décoratifs, located in the sumptuous former residence of the cardinals of Rohan, the Palais Rohan displays a reputable collection of 18th century furniture and china.
- The Cabinet des estampes et des dessins displays five centuries of engravings and drawings, but also woodcuts and lithographies.
- The Musée Tomi Ungerer/Centre international de l'illustration, located in a large former villa next to the Theatre, displays original works by Ungerer and other artists (Saul Steinberg, Ronald Searle ... ) as well as Ungerer's large collection of ancient toys.

==== Other museums ====
- The Musée archéologique presents a large display of regional findings from the first ages of man to the sixth century, focusing on the Roman and Celtic period. It also includes a collection of works from Ancient Egypt and Ancient Greece, assembled and bequeathed by Gustave Schlumberger.
- The Musée alsacien is dedicated to traditional Alsatian daily life.
- Le Vaisseau ("The vessel") is a science and technology centre, especially designed for children.
- The Musée historique (historical museum) is dedicated to the tumultuous history of the city and displays many artifacts of the times, including the Grüselhorn, the horn that was blown at 10 every evening during medieval times to order the Jews out of the city.
- The Musée vodou (Voodoo museum) opened its doors on 28 November 2013. Displaying a private collection of artefacts from Haiti, it is located in a former water tower (château d'eau) built in 1883 and classified as a Monument historique.
- The Musée du barreau de Strasbourg (The Strasbourg bar association museum) is a museum dedicated to the work and the history of lawyers in the city.

==== University museums ====
The Université de Strasbourg is in charge of a number of permanent public displays of its collections of scientific artefacts and products of all kinds of exploration and research.

- The Musée zoologique is one of the oldest in France and is especially famous for its collection of birds. The museum is co-administered by the municipality.
- The Gypsothèque (also known as Musée des moulages or Musée Adolf Michaelis) is France's second-largest cast collection and the largest university cast collection in France.
- The Musée de Sismologie et Magnétisme terrestre displays antique instruments of measure.
- The Musée Pasteur is a collection of medical curiosities.
- The Musée de minéralogie is dedicated to minerals.
- The Musée d'Égyptologie houses a collections of archaeological findings made in and brought from Egypt and Sudan. This collection is entirely separate from the Schlumberger collection of the Musée archéologique (see above).
- The Crypte aux étoiles ("star crypt") is situated in the vaulted basement below the Observatory of Strasbourg and displays old telescopes and other antique astronomical devices such as clocks and theodolites.

==== Museums in the suburbs ====
- Musée Les Secrets du Chocolat (Chocolate museum) in Geispolsheim
- Fort Frère in Oberhausbergen
- Fort Rapp in Reichstett
- MM Park France, a military museum, in La Wantzenau

== Demographics ==
The commune of Strasbourg proper had a population of 293,771 on 1 January 2021, the result of a constant moderate annual growth which is also reflected in the constant growth of the number of students at its university (e. g. from 42,000 students in 2010 to 52,000 students in 2019). The metropolitan area of Strasbourg had a population of 853,110 inhabitants in 2019 (French side of the border only), while the transnational Eurodistrict had a population of 1 million in 2022.

In the Middle Ages, Strasbourg (a free imperial city since 1262) was an important town. According to a 1444 census, the population was circa 20,000; only one third less than Cologne, then a major European city.

Historical population

Year	Pop.	±% p.a.
1793	47,254	—
1800	49,056	+0.54%
1806	51,465	+0.80%
1821	49,680	−0.24%
1831	49,712	+0.01%
1836	57,885	+3.09%
1841	70,298	+3.96%
1846	71,992	+0.48%
1851	75,565	+0.97%
1856	77,656	+0.55%
1861	82,014	+1.10%
1866	84,167	+0.52%
1871	85,654	+0.35%
1875	94,306	+2.43%
1880	104,471	+2.07%
1885	111,987	+1.40%
1890	123,500	+1.98%
1895	135,608	+1.89%
1900	151,041	+2.18%

Year	Pop.	±% p.a.
1905	167,678	+2.11%
1910	178,891	+1.30%
1921	166,767	−0.64%
1926	174,492	+0.91%
1931	181,465	+0.79%
1936	193,119	+1.25%
1946	175,515	−0.95%
1954	200,921	+1.70%
1962	228,971	+1.65%
1968	249,396	+1.43%
1975	253,384	+0.23%
1982	248,712	−0.27%
1990	252,338	+0.18%
1999	264,115	+0.51%
2007	272,123	+0.37%
2012	274,394	+0.17%
2017	280,966	+0.47%
2023	293,771	+0.75%

Source: EHESS and INSEE (since 1968)

=== Population composition ===
	2012	%	2007	%
Total population	274,394	100	272,123	100
0–14 years	47,473	17.3	46,263	17.0
15–29 years	77,719	28.3	78,291	28.8
30–44 years	54,514	19.9	54,850	20.2
45–59 years	45,436	16.6	47,236	17.4
60–74 years	30,321	11.1	27,060	9.9
75+ years	18,931	6.9	18,424	6.8

== Culture ==
Strasbourg is the seat of internationally renowned institutions of music and drama:

- The Orchestre philharmonique de Strasbourg, founded in 1855, one of the oldest symphonic orchestras in western Europe. Based since 1975 in the Palais de la musique et des congrès.
- The Opéra national du Rhin
- The Théâtre national de Strasbourg
- The Percussions de Strasbourg
- The Théâtre du Maillon
- The "Laiterie"

Other theatres are the Théâtre jeune public, the TAPS Scala and the Kafteur.

=== Events ===
- Musica, international festival of contemporary classical music (autumn)
- Festival international de Strasbourg (founded in 1932), festival of classical music and jazz (summer)
- Festival Augenblick, film festival held annually since 2005.
- Festival des Artefacts, festival of contemporary non-classical music
- Les Nuits électroniques de l'Ososphère
- Strasbourg European Fantastic Film Festival is an annual film festival devoted to science fiction, horror and fantasy. It was known as the Spectre Film Festival before 2008.
- Strasbulles is the annual comic con, also known as the European Festival of Bande Dessinée
- The Strasbourg International Film Festival is an annual film festival focusing on new and emerging independent filmmakers from around the world.
- Christkindelsmärik, held from the end of November through December, is an annual Christmas market that dates back to 1570.

== Education ==
=== Universities and tertiary education ===
Strasbourg, well known as a centre of humanism, has a long history of excellence in higher education, at the crossroads of French and German intellectual traditions. Although Strasbourg had been annexed by the Kingdom of France in 1683, it still remained connected to the German-speaking intellectual world throughout the 18th century, and the university attracted numerous students from the Holy Roman Empire, with Goethe, Metternich and Montgelas, who studied law in Strasbourg, among the most prominent. With 19 Nobel prizes in total, Strasbourg is the most eminent French university outside of Paris.

Until 2009, there were three universities in Strasbourg, with an approximate total of 48,500 students in 2007, and another 4,500 students attended one of the diverse post-graduate schools:

- Strasbourg I – Louis Pasteur University
- Strasbourg II – Marc Bloch University
- Strasbourg III – Robert Schuman University

The three institutions merged in 2009, forming the Université de Strasbourg. Its component schools include:

- Sciences Po Strasbourg (Institut d'études politiques de Strasbourg), the University of Strasbourg's political science and international studies centre
- The EMS (EM Strasbourg Business School), the University of Strasbourg's business school
- The INSA (Institut national des sciences appliquées), the University of Strasbourg's engineering school
- The ENA (École nationale d'administration). ENA trains most of the nation's high-ranking civil servants. The relocation to Strasbourg was meant to give a European vocation to the school and to implement the French government's "décentralisation" plan.
- The ISEG Group (Institut supérieur européen de gestion group)
- The ECPM (École européenne de chimie, polymères et matériaux)
- The EPITA (École pour l'informatique et les techniques avancées)
- The EPITECH (École pour l'informatique et les nouvelles technologies)
- The ITIRI (Institute de traducteurs, d'interpretes, et de relations Internationales)
- The INET (Institut national des études territoriales)
- The IIEF (Institut international d'études françaises)
- Three IUTs (Instituts universitaires de technologie located in Schiltigheim, Illkirch and Haguenau)
- The ENGEES (École nationale du génie de l'eau et de l'environnement de Strasbourg)
- The CUEJ (Centre universitaire d'enseignement du journalisme)
- TÉLÉCOM Physique Strasbourg (École nationale supérieure de physique de Strasbourg), Institute of Technology, located in the South of Strasbourg (Illkirch-Graffenstaden)

==== Other tertiary institutions ====
Two American colleges have a base in Strasbourg: Syracuse University, New York, and Centre College, Kentucky. There is also HEAR (Haute école des arts du Rhin) the celebrated art school, and the International Space University in the south of Strasbourg (Illkirch-Graffenstaden).

The European Center for Studies and Research in Ethics is a tertiary establishment for research and education in Ethics. This center is located at the premises of the old faculty of medicine in Strasbourg. The Center’s name in French is CEERE (Centre européen d’enseignement et de recherche en éthique).

=== Primary and secondary education ===
International schools include:

Multiple levels:

- European School of Strasbourg (priority given to children whose parents are employed at the European institutions)
- International School Strasbourg

For elementary education:

- École Internationale Robert Schuman
- International School at Lucie Berger
- Russian Mission School in Strasbourg

For middle school/junior high school education:

- Collège International de l'Esplanade

For senior high school/sixth form college:

- Lycée International des Pontonniers (FR)
- Lycée International Jean Sturm

== Libraries ==
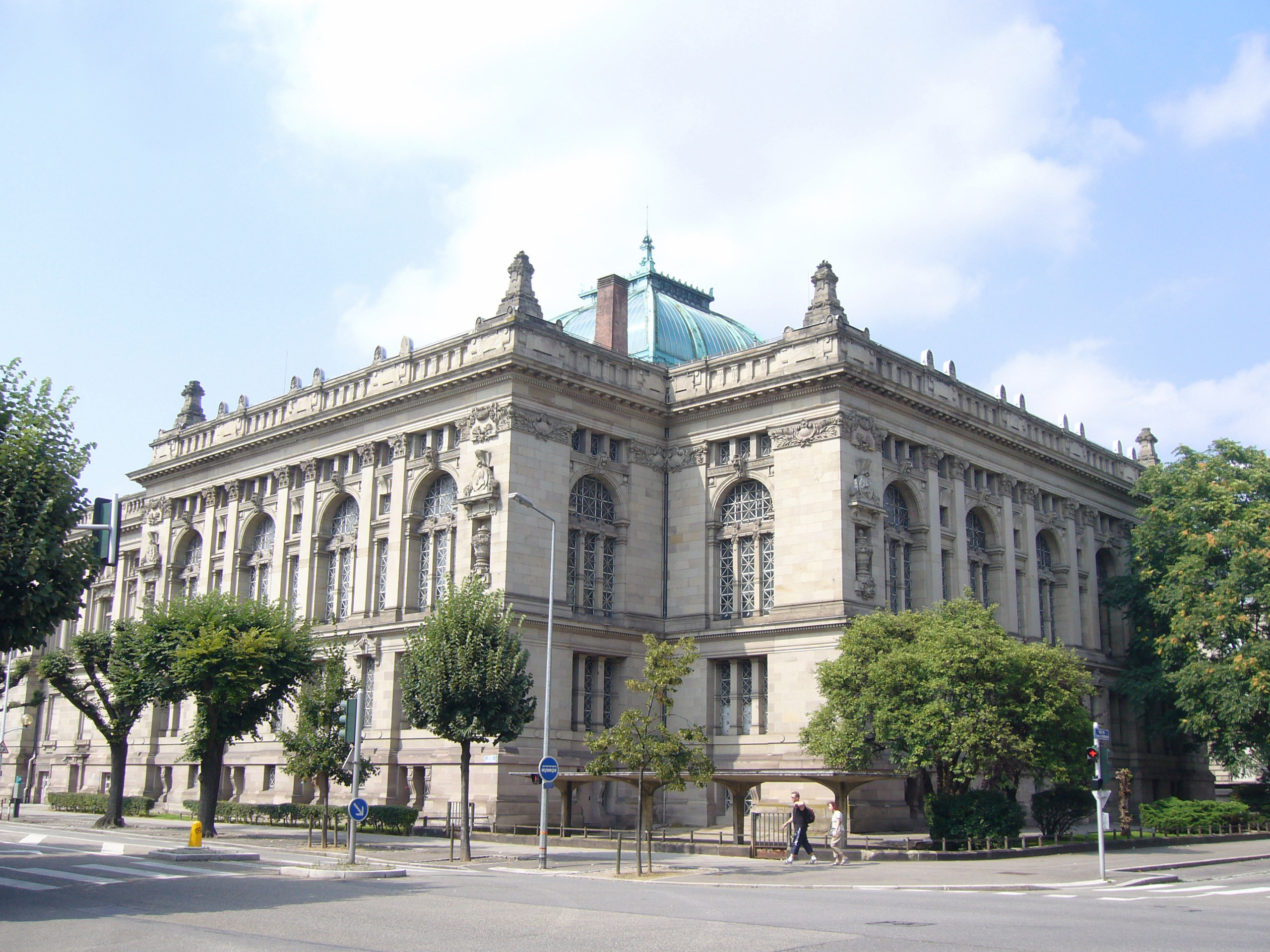
National Library

The Bibliothèque nationale et universitaire (BNU) is, with its collection of more than 3 million titles, the second-largest library in France after the Bibliothèque nationale de France. It was founded by the German administration after the complete destruction of the previous municipal library in 1871 and holds the unique status of being simultaneously a students' and a national library. The Strasbourg municipal library had been marked erroneously as "City Hall" in a French commercial map, which had been captured and used by the German artillery to lay their guns. A librarian from Munich later pointed out "...that the destruction of the precious collection was not the fault of a German artillery officer, who used the French map, but of the slovenly and inaccurate scholarship of a Frenchman."

The municipal library Bibliothèque municipale de Strasbourg (BMS) administers a network of ten medium-sized libraries in different areas of the town. A six stories high "Grande bibliothèque", the Médiathèque André Malraux, was inaugurated on 19 September 2008 and is considered the largest in Eastern France.

=== Incunabula ===
As one of the earliest centres of book-printing in Europe (see above: History), Strasbourg for a long time held a large number of incunabula—books printed before 1500—in its library as one of its most precious heritages: no less than 7,000. After the total destruction of this institution in 1870, however, a new collection had to be reassembled from scratch. Today, Strasbourg's different public and institutional libraries again display a sizable total number of incunabula, distributed as follows: Bibliothèque nationale et universitaire, ca. 2,120, Médiathèque de la ville et de la communauté urbaine de Strasbourg, 349, Bibliothèque du Grand Séminaire, 238, Médiathèque protestante, 66, and Bibliothèque alsatique du Crédit Mutuel, 5.

== Transport ==
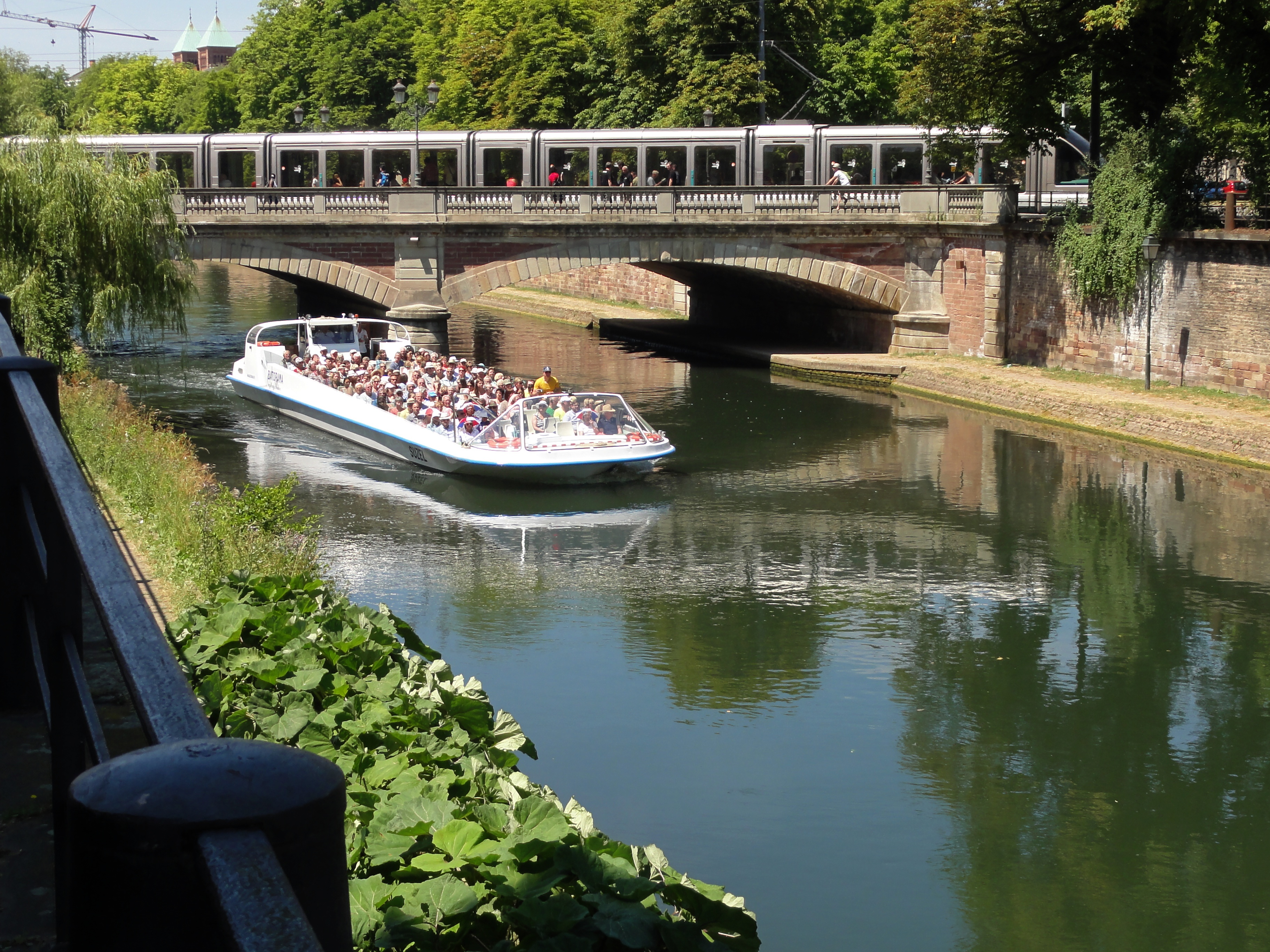
One of Strasbourg's trams passes over one of its canals, while a tourist trip boat passes underneath.

Train services and the Réseau express métropolitain européen operates from the Gare de Strasbourg, the city's main station in the city centre, eastward to Offenburg and Karlsruhe in Germany, westward to Metz and Paris, and southward to Basel. Strasbourg's links with the rest of France have improved due to its recent connection to the TGV network, with the first phase of the TGV Est (Paris–Strasbourg) in 2007, the TGV Rhin-Rhône (Strasbourg-Lyon) in 2011, and the second phase of the TGV Est in July 2016.

Strasbourg also has its own airport, serving major domestic destinations as well as international destinations in Europe and northern Africa. The airport is linked to the Gare de Strasbourg by a frequent train service.

City transport in Strasbourg includes the Strasbourg tramway, which opened in 1994 and is operated by the regional transit company Compagnie des Transports Strasbourgeois (CTS), consisting of 6 lines with a total length of 55.8 km (34.7 mi). The CTS also operates a comprehensive bus network throughout the city that is integrated with the trams. With more than 500 km (311 mi) of bicycle paths, biking in the city is convenient and the CTS operates a cheap bike-sharing scheme named Vélhop. The CTS and its predecessors also operated a previous generation of tram system between 1878 and 1960, complemented by trolleybus routes between 1939 and 1962.

Being on the Ill and close to the Rhine, Strasbourg has always been an important centre of fluvial navigation, as is attested by archeological findings. In 1682 the Canal de la Bruche was added to the river navigations, initially to provide transport for sandstone from quarries in the Vosges for use in the fortification of the city. That canal has since closed, but the subsequent Canal du Rhône au Rhin, Canal de la Marne au Rhin and Grand Canal d'Alsace are still in use, as is the important activity of the Port autonome de Strasbourg. Water tourism inside the city proper attracts hundreds of thousands of tourists yearly.

The tram system that now criss-crosses the historic city centre complements walking and biking in it. The centre has been transformed into a pedestrian priority zone that enables and invites walking and biking by making these active modes of transport comfortable, safe and enjoyable. These attributes are accomplished by applying the principle of "filtered permeability" to the existing irregular network of streets. It means that the network adaptations favour active transport and, selectively, "filter out" the car by reducing the number of streets that run through the centre. While certain streets are discontinuous for cars, they connect to a network of pedestrian and bike paths which permeate the entire centre. In addition, these paths go through public squares and open spaces increasing the enjoyment of the trip. This logic of filtering a mode of transport is fully expressed in a comprehensive model for laying out neighbourhoods and districts—the fused grid.

At present the A35 autoroute, which parallels the Rhine between Karlsruhe and Basel, and the A4 autoroute, which links Paris with Strasbourg, penetrate close to the centre of the city. The Grand contournement ouest (GCO) project, programmed since 1999, planned to construct a 24-kilometre-long (15 mi) highway connection between the junctions of the A4 and the A35 autoroutes in the north and of the A35 and A352 autoroutes in the south. This routes well to the west of the city in order to divest a significant portion of motorized traffic from the unité urbaine. The GCO project was opposed by environmentalists, who created a ZAD (or Zone to Defend). After much delay, the GCO was finally inaugurated on 11 December 2021 as the A355 autoroute.

=== Strasbourg public transport statistics ===
The average amount of time people spend commuting on public transport in Strasbourg on weekdays is 52 minutes. Seven percent of travellers on public transport travel for more than 2 hours every day. The average amount of time people wait at a stop or station for public transport is 9 minutes and 11% of passengers wait for more than 20 minutes on average every day. The average distance people usually travel in a single trip on public transport is 3.9 km (2.4 mi), whilst none travels for more than 12 km (7.5 mi) in a single direction.

== European role ==
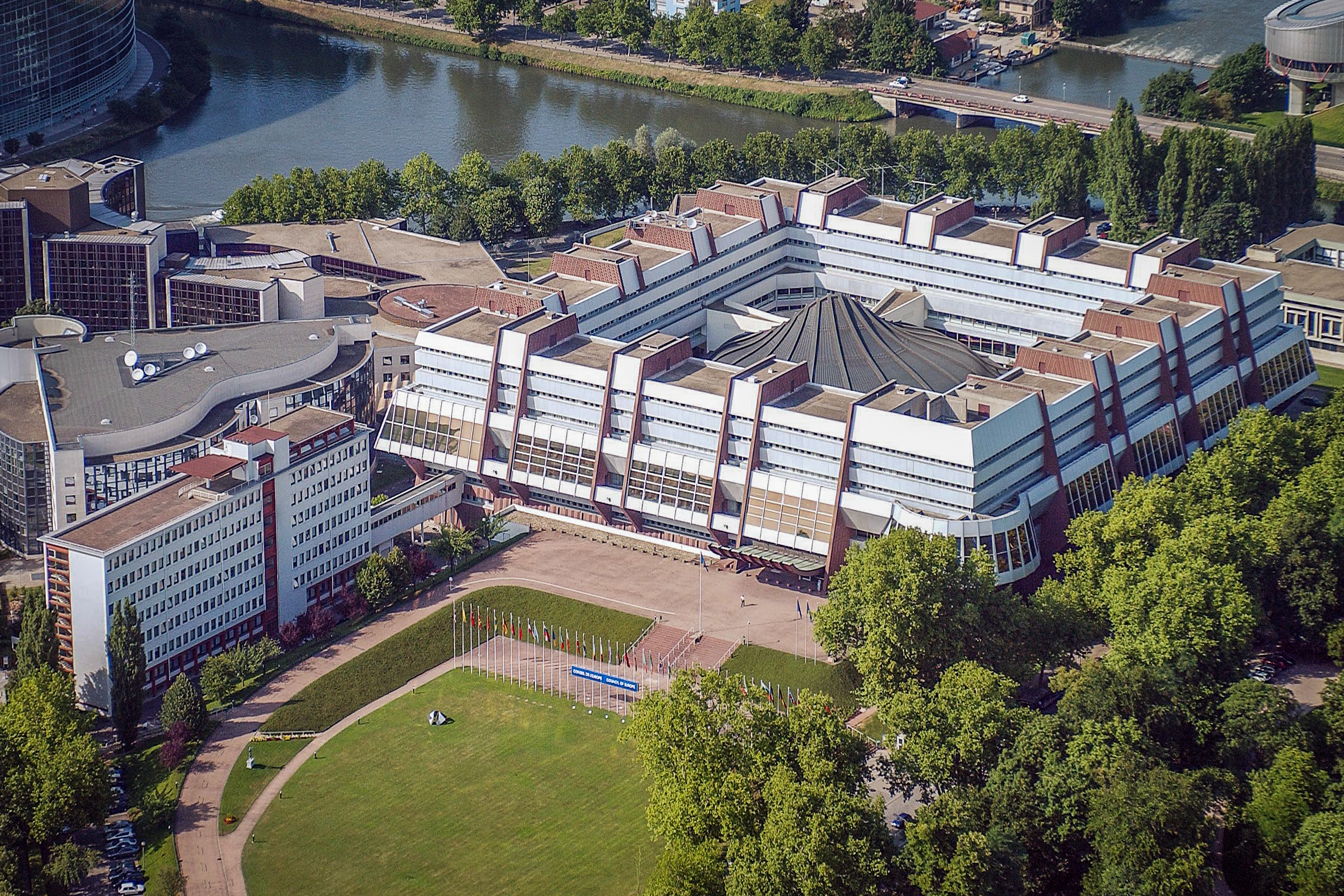
The Palace of Europe of the Council of Europe

=== Institutions ===
Strasbourg is the seat of over twenty international institutions, most famously of the Council of Europe and of the European Parliament, of which it is the official seat. Strasbourg is considered the legislative and democratic capital of the European Union, while Brussels is considered the executive and administrative capital and Luxembourg the judiciary and financial capital.

Strasbourg is the seat of the following organisations, among others:

- Central Commission for Navigation on the Rhine (since 1920)
- Council of Europe with all the bodies and organisations affiliated to this institution (since 1949)
- European Parliament (since 1952)
- European Ombudsman
- Eurocorps headquarters,
- Franco-German television channel Arte
- European Science Foundation
- International Institute of Human Rights
- Human Frontier Science Program
- International Commission on Civil Status
- Assembly of European Regions
- Centre for European Studies (French: Centre d'études européennes de Strasbourg)
- Sakharov Prize

=== Eurodistrict ===
France and Germany have created a Eurodistrict straddling the Rhine, combining the Greater Strasbourg and the Ortenau district of Baden-Württemberg, with some common administration. It was established in 2005 and has been fully functional since 2010.

== Sports ==
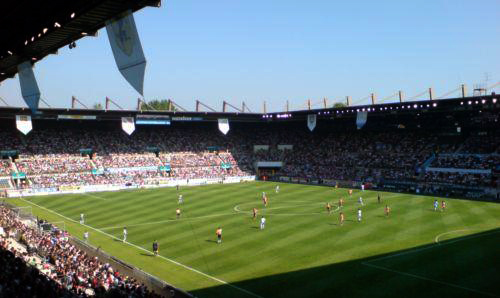
Stade de la Meinau, home of RC Strasbourg

Sporting teams from Strasbourg are the Racing Club de Strasbourg Alsace (football), SIG Strasbourg (basketball) and the Étoile Noire (ice hockey). The women's tennis Internationaux de Strasbourg is one of the most important French tournaments of its kind outside Roland-Garros. In 1922, Strasbourg was the venue for the XVI Grand Prix de l'A.C.F. which saw Fiat battle Bugatti, Ballot, Rolland Pilain, and Britain's Aston Martin and Sunbeam.

In 2006 Strasbourg hosted the Grand Depart of the Tour de France.

The city is home to SN Strasbourg, a First division water polo team that plays its home games at the Piscine de la Kibitzenau.

== Honours ==
Honours associated with the city of Strasbourg:

- The Medal of Honor Strasbourg
- Sakharov Prize seated in Strasbourg
- City of Strasbourg Silver (gilt) Medal, a former medal with City Coat of Arms and Ten Arms of the Cities of the Dekapolis

== Notable people ==
In chronological order, notable people born in Strasbourg include:

- Eric of Friuli
- Johannes Tauler
- Sebastian Brant
- Jean Baptiste Kléber
- Louis Ramond de Carbonnières
- François Christophe Kellermann
- Marie Tussaud
- Ludwig I of Bavaria
- Charles Frédéric Gerhardt
- Louis-Frédéric Schützenberger
- Gustave Doré
- Émile Waldteufel
- Jean-Georges Cornélius
- René Beeh
- Jean/Hans Arp
- Charles Münch
- Hans Bethe
- Maurice Kriegel-Valrimont
- Marcel Marceau
- Tomi Ungerer
- Elizabeth Sombart
- Arsène Wenger
- Petit
- Pio Marmaï
- Matt Pokora
- Barbara Pravi

In chronological order, notable residents of Strasbourg include:

- Johannes Gutenberg
- Hans Baldung
- Martin Bucer
- John Calvin
- Joachim Meyer
- Johann Carolus
- Johann Wolfgang Goethe
- Jakob Michael Reinhold Lenz
- Klemens Wenzel von Metternich
- Georg Büchner
- Louis Pasteur
- Ferdinand Braun
- Albrecht Kossel
- Georg Simmel
- Albert Schweitzer
- Otto Klemperer
- Marc Bloch
- Alberto Fujimori
- Marjane Satrapi
- Paul Ricœur
- Jean-Marie Lehn

== Twin towns and sister cities ==
Strasbourg is twinned with:

- Boston, United States, since 1960
- Leicester, United Kingdom, since 1960
- Stuttgart, Germany, since 1962
- Dresden, Germany, since 1990
- Ramat Gan, Israel, since 1991
- Aida Camp, Palestine, since 2025

Strasbourg has cooperative agreements with:

- Jacmel, Haiti, since 1991 (Coopération décentralisée)
- Fez, Morocco, since 1999 (Coopération décentralisée)
- Douala, Cameroon, since 2005 (Coopération décentralisée)
- Vologda, Russia, since 2009 (Coopération décentralisée)
- Oran, Algeria, since 2015 (Coopération décentralisée)
- Kairouan, Tunisia, since 2015 (Coopération décentralisée)
- Moscow, Russia, since 2016 (Coopération décentralisée)
- Kampala, Uganda, since 2018 (Coopération décentralisée)
- Kagoshima, Japan, since 2019 (Coopération décentralisée)

== In popular culture ==
=== In film ===
- The opening scenes of the 1977 Ridley Scott film The Duellists take place in Strasbourg in 1800.
- The 2007 film In the City of Sylvia is set in Strasbourg.
- Early February 2011, principal photography for Sherlock Holmes: A Game of Shadows (2011) moved for two days to Strasbourg. Shooting took place on, around, and inside the Strasbourg Cathedral. The opening scene of the movie covers an assassination-bombing in the city.

=== In literature ===
- One of the longest chapters of Laurence Sterne's novel Tristram Shandy (1759–1767), "Slawkenbergius' tale", takes place in Strasbourg.
- An episode of Matthew Gregory Lewis' novel The Monk (1796) takes place in the forests then surrounding Strasbourg.
- A part of the story in White Album 2 takes place in Strasbourg.

=== In music ===
- Wolfgang Amadeus Mozart called his Third violin concerto (1775) Straßburger Konzert because of one of its most prominent motives, based on a local, minuet-like dance that had already appeared as a tune in a symphony by Carl Ditters von Dittersdorf. It is not related to Mozart's ulterior stay in Strasbourg (1778), where he gave three concert performances on the piano.
- Havergal Brian's Symphony No. 7 was inspired by passages in Goethe's memoirs recalling his time spent at Strasbourg University. The work ends with an orchestral bell sounding the note E, the strike-note of the bell of Strasbourg Cathedral.
- British art-punk band The Rakes had a minor hit in 2005 with their song "Strasbourg". This song features witty lyrics with themes of espionage and vodka and includes a count of 'eins, zwei, drei, vier!!', even though Strasbourg's spoken language is French.
- On their 1974 album Hamburger Concerto, Dutch progressive band Focus included a track called "La Cathédrale de Strasbourg", which included chimes from a cathedral-like bell.
- Strasbourg pie, a dish containing foie gras, is mentioned in the finale of the Andrew Lloyd Webber musical Cats.
- Several works have specifically been dedicated to Strasbourg Cathedral, notably ad hoc compositions (masses, motets etc.) by Kapellmeisters Franz Xaver Richter and Ignaz Pleyel and, more recently, It is Finished by John Tavener.

=== In television ===
- The French police procedural series César Wagner takes place in and around Strasbourg, with episodes set at the ECHR, National Theatre of Strasbourg and other locally prominent locations. The title character's mother is the city's mayor.
