= Réseau express métropolitain européen =

Railway system in the Strasbourg region

Réseau express métropolitain européen (REME)

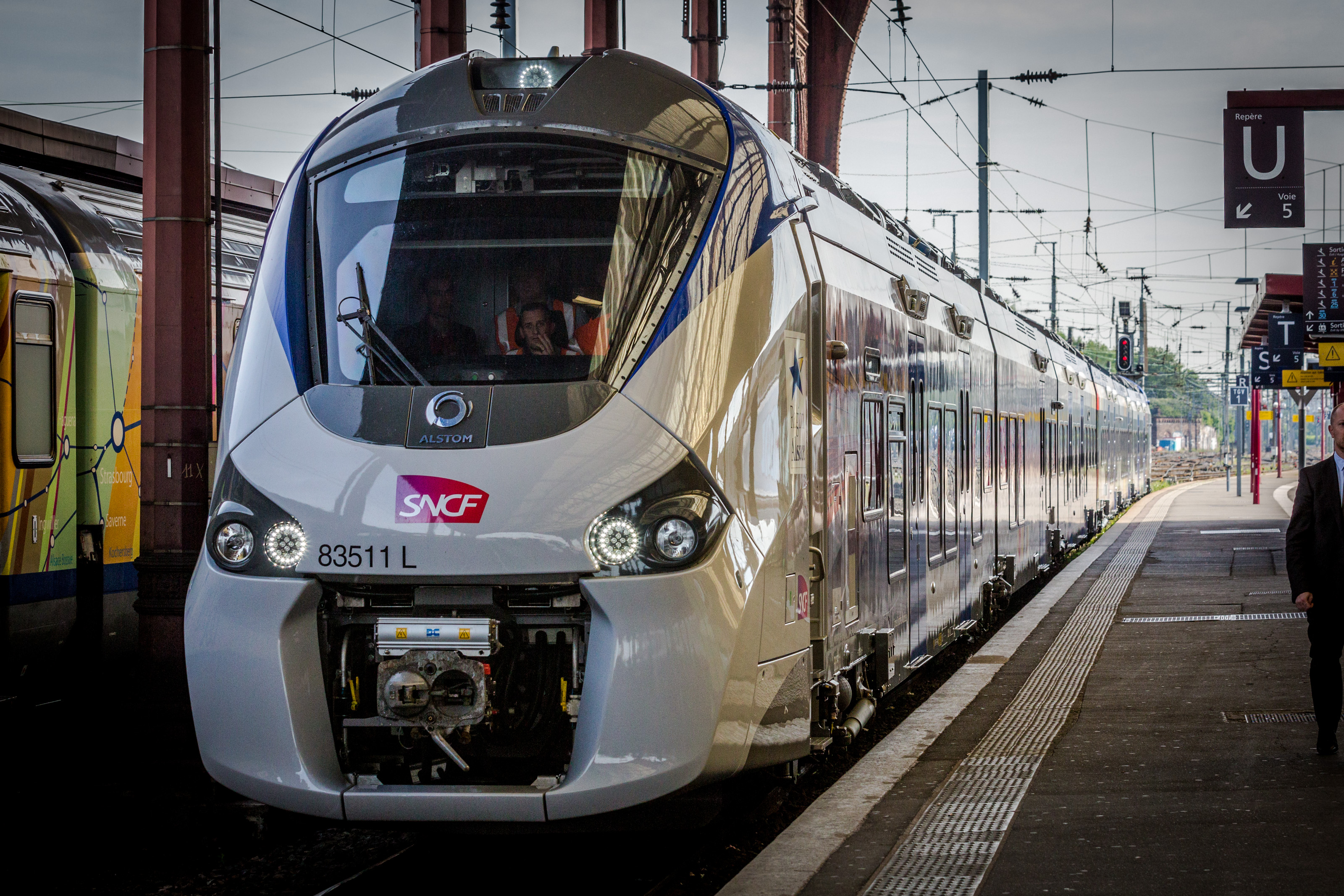
- Strasbourg-Haguenau train at Strasbourg-Ville station

Overview
- Owner: SNCF
- Locale: Grand Est, Baden-Württemberg
- Transit type: Commuter rail
- Number of lines: 3
- Number of stations: 37

Operation
- Began operation: 11 December 2022; 3 years ago
- Operator: SNCF (all lines)

Technical
- System length: 140 km (87 mi)
- Track gauge: 1,435 mm (4 ft 8 1/2 in) standard gauge
- Electrification: Overhead line, 25 kV 50 Hz AC
- Top speed: 140 km/h (90 mph)
Vector map of the network

The Réseau Express Métropolitain Européen (French pronunciation: [ʁezo ɛkspʁɛs metʁɔpɔlitɛ œʁopeɛn]; English: Metropolitan European Express Network), commonly abbreviated REME or Strasbourg RER (pronounced [ɛʁəɛʁ]), is a commuter rail system serving Strasbourg and its suburbs. It acts as a combined city centre underground rail system and suburbs-to-city-centre commuter rail, similar to the RER in Paris and Brussels; S-Bahn in Germany, Austria and Switzerland; S-train in Copenhagen; the Pendeltåg in Sweden; the Overground in London; S Lines in Milan; etc. Eventually, the network will extend to all rail lines and road networks in the Strasbourg catchment area on the French side of the Rhine, as well as in Germany. Initiated by the Grand Est region and the Strasbourg Eurometropolis, the project was due to go into service on December 11, 2022, with completion scheduled for 2030.

== Characteristics ==
=== First phase ===
The first phase of the REME project involves increasing frequency on existing services, introducing half-hourly intervals, extending the range of service hours (up to 10 p.m.), and diametralizing certain services to provide a direct route between Saverne and Sélestat. Three de facto lines have thus been created (Strasbourg ⥋ Haguenau, Strasbourg ⥋ Molsheim and Saverne ⥋ Sélestat). However, the REME does not have its own identity, as trains running on the lines concerned continue to operate under the TER brand, without any other distinctive designation, and without the lines being assigned specific numbers or names.

== History ==
In 2017, the ASTUS association, a member of the National Federation of transport users' associations, initiated a study on the technical feasibility of a through RER in the Strasbourg metropolitan area, with the help of a student from the University of Strasbourg's Faculty of Geography and Planning.

The aim is to serve the metropolitan area in addition to the existing urban and interurban networks, as well as other urban centers in the département to the north and south of Strasbourg.

On May 7, 2021, the Strasbourg Eurometropole voted on a plan to set up a metropolitan express network service. The plan calls for the diametralization, pacing and reinforcement of services, including the construction of a fourth track over six kilometers between Vendenheim and Strasbourg.

On November 27, 2022, French President Emmanuel Macron announced his intention to develop the RER network around major cities.

The network begins to be deployed on December 11, 2022, for completion in 2030. The project is fully co-financed by the Grand Est region and the Eurométropole de Strasbourg, to the tune of 14.5 million euros per year.

== Lines ==
The network, inaugurated on December 11, 2022, is comparable to the RER C and D in the Paris region, with trains running every 15 to 30 minutes on a regular timetable, and tracks shared with TGVs (unlike the Paris RER A and B, which are more like a metro). The system is gradually being rolled out until April 2023.

The network serves nine stations in the Eurometropole. Future plans include the creation of new stops, the modernization of existing stations and the creation of new platforms at Strasbourg-Ville station. The network is due to be extended until 2030.

Strasbourg REME lines
| Line name | Operator | Opened | Last extension | Stations | Trains in service | Length |
|---|---|---|---|---|---|---|
| Saverne ⥋ Sélestat | SNCF | 2022 | N/A | 20 | N/A | 87.21 km (54.19 mi) |
| Strasbourg ⥋ Haguenau | SNCF | 2022 | N/A | 9 | N/A | 34.01 km (21.13 mi) |
| Strasbourg ⥋ Molsheim | SNCF | 2022 | N/A | 8 | N/A | 18.92 km (11.76 mi) (Note: Before the section between Epinay-sur-Orge, Massy-Palaiseau, and Versailles-Chantiers was transferred to the T12 and Transilien V.) |

== See also ==
- Communauté d'agglomération de Haguenau
- Eurométropole de Strasbourg
- Strasbourg–Basel railway
- Paris RER
