= Independent Port of Strasbourg =

Inland port on the Rhine at Strasbourg, France

Port of Strasbourg
- Interactive map of Port of Strasbourg
- Native name: Port autonome de Strasbourg

Location
- Country: France
- Location: Strasbourg, Grand Est

Details
- Opened: 1926
- Type of Harbor: Inland port
- Size of harbour: 200 ha of docks
- Land area: 1,060 ha in Strasbourg
- Employees: c. 10,000 jobs generated across the port area

Statistics
- Annual cargo tonnage: 6.2 million tonnes by river (2024)
- Annual container volume: 319,750 TEU (2024)
- Website www.strasbourg.port.fr

The Port of Strasbourg (French: Port autonome de Strasbourg, commonly abbreviated PAS) is an inland port on the Rhine at Strasbourg, France. It is the second-largest river port in France and acts as a major multimodal freight hub for the Grand Est region.

The port operates as a French public administrative establishment and manages a network of port facilities extending along approximately 100 km of the Rhine. Its estate includes the main port at Strasbourg as well as facilities at Lauterbourg, Beinheim, Marckolsheim and a series of loading points between Seltz and Rhinau.

The PAS group also owns two subsidiaries: Rhine Europe Terminals, which operates container and heavy-cargo terminals, and Batorama, which runs sightseeing boat services in Strasbourg.

== History ==
The present port authority has its origins in an agreement concluded between the French state and the city of Strasbourg on 20 May 1923. The agreement was approved by legislation on 26 April 1924, establishing the legal framework for the autonomous port.

The Port autonome de Strasbourg formally came into being in 1926.

The development of the modern port followed earlier harbour construction in Strasbourg, including the creation of the Commerce and Industry basins around the turn of the 20th century. The expansion of Rhine navigation and the development of rail connections subsequently strengthened Strasbourg's role as a major inland freight centre.

The port marked its centenary in 2026.

== Organisation and governance ==
The Port of Strasbourg is a public administrative establishment with financial autonomy. Its income is derived mainly from property-related revenue, including the leasing of port land and water areas, together with fees for the use of its infrastructure.

Its board of directors includes representatives of the French state, the City of Strasbourg, regional and departmental authorities, the local chamber of commerce, the port of Kehl and employee representatives.

The port's status is unusual within France, reflecting the historic relationship between Strasbourg and the French state and the importance of the Rhine as an international transport corridor.

== Port estate and facilities ==
The Port of Strasbourg manages a port estate extending for approximately 100 km along the Rhine.

The main Strasbourg port covers around 1,060 hectares, including approximately 200 hectares of docks. The wider network includes:

- the main port of Strasbourg;
- Lauterbourg;
- Beinheim;
- Marckolsheim;
- Seltz;
- Fort-Louis;
- Dalhunden;
- Drusenheim;
- Offendorf;
- Gerstheim; and
- Rhinau.

The port combines river, rail and road transport and operates as a major multimodal logistics platform for eastern France.

Container handling is concentrated at terminals in Strasbourg and Lauterbourg. A new trimodal container terminal at Lauterbourg opened in 2018. The facility includes a gantry crane and two 400-metre railway tracks, allowing containers to be transferred between river, rail and road.

== Activity ==
The Port of Strasbourg is France's second-largest river port.

In 2024, the port handled approximately 6.2 million tonnes of goods by river and around 1 million tonnes by rail. Container traffic reached 319,750 TEU, around half of which was transported by river.

The main categories of cargo handled include cereals, petroleum products, aggregates and containerised freight.

Around 350 businesses are located within the port area, supporting approximately 10,000 jobs.

== Strategic development and decarbonisation ==
In 2024 the port adopted its 2024–2028 strategic plan. The plan focuses on four broad priorities: strengthening the port's role in environmental transition, improving its multimodal freight function, supporting regional development and modernising its internal organisation.

In 2025 the PAS launched the operational phase of CLES 2050, a decarbonisation programme developed under the French government's ZIBAC programme within France 2030.

The programme aims to reduce industrial greenhouse-gas emissions across the Strasbourg port area by 81% by 2050. It also seeks to encourage cooperation between industrial companies, logistics operators and public authorities and to support new low-carbon energy and industrial projects.

== Subsidiaries ==
=== Rhine Europe Terminals ===
Rhine Europe Terminals is wholly owned by the Port of Strasbourg and operates the container and heavy-cargo terminals at Strasbourg and Lauterbourg. The port describes it as the leading river-container terminal operator in France.

=== Batorama ===
Batorama is the port's tourism subsidiary and operates sightseeing cruises through Strasbourg.

The service developed from tourist boat trips first introduced in the 20th century and has become one of the principal paid tourist attractions in the Grand Est region. The company carries close to 800,000 passengers annually.

== See also ==
- Rhine
- Port of Kehl
- Strasbourg
- Inland port
