= 2018 Strasbourg attack =

Terrorist attack in Strasbourg, France

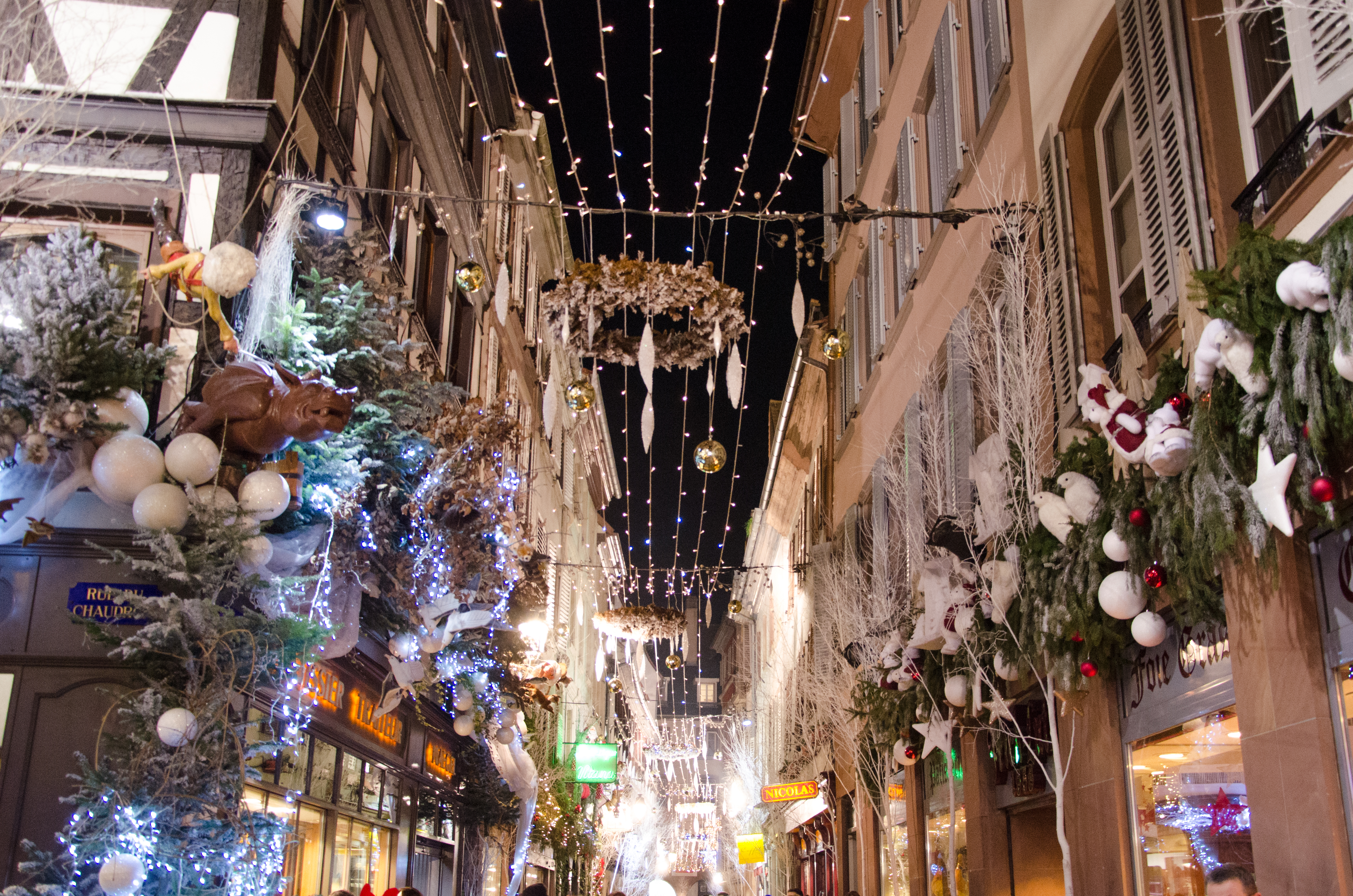
- Rue des Orfèvres where the attack started (pictured in December 2016)

- Strasbourg (France)
- Location: 48.582611°N 7.748889°E; Strasbourg, France
- Date: 11 December 2018; 7 years ago 19:48 - 19:58 ((UTC+1))
- Attack type: Mass shooting, stabbing, mass murder, Islamic terrorism
- Weapons: Modèle 1892 revolver; Knife
- Deaths: 6 (including perpetrator)
- Injuries: 11 (4 severely)
- Perpetrators: Chérif Chekatt (killed in subsequent shootout)
- Motive: Jihadism

On the evening of 11 December 2018, a terrorist attack occurred in Strasbourg, France, when a man attacked civilians in the city's busy Christkindelsmärik (Christmas market) with a revolver and a knife, killing five and wounding 11 before fleeing in a taxi. Authorities called the shooting an act of terrorism.

The attacker was 29-year-old Chérif Chekatt, who had multiple criminal convictions and was on a security services watchlist as a suspected Islamist extremist. Chekatt was killed in a shootout with French police on the evening of 13 December after a manhunt involving 700 officers. Judicial sources said he had pledged allegiance to the terrorist organisation Islamic State of Iraq and the Levant (ISIL).

== Background ==
Christkindelsmärik is the Alsatian dialect name of the Christmas market in Strasbourg, held annually on the square in front of the Strasbourg Cathedral since 1570. In 2000, a bombing plot was foiled by the French and German police when Al-Qaeda-linked operatives had planned to detonate pressure cookers rigged as bombs in the crowd at the Christkindelsmärik. Since then, the market has been under reinforced security. In 2016, several people were arrested in Marseille and Strasbourg for planning a terrorist attack; officials considered cancelling the Christmas market, but it was ultimately held as scheduled.

On the morning of 11 December 2018, the police raided the home of Chérif Chekatt in Neudorf with the intention of arresting him on suspicion of attempted murder. He was not at home, but they found a stun grenade, a loaded .22 calibre rifle, four knives, and ammunition.

== Attack ==
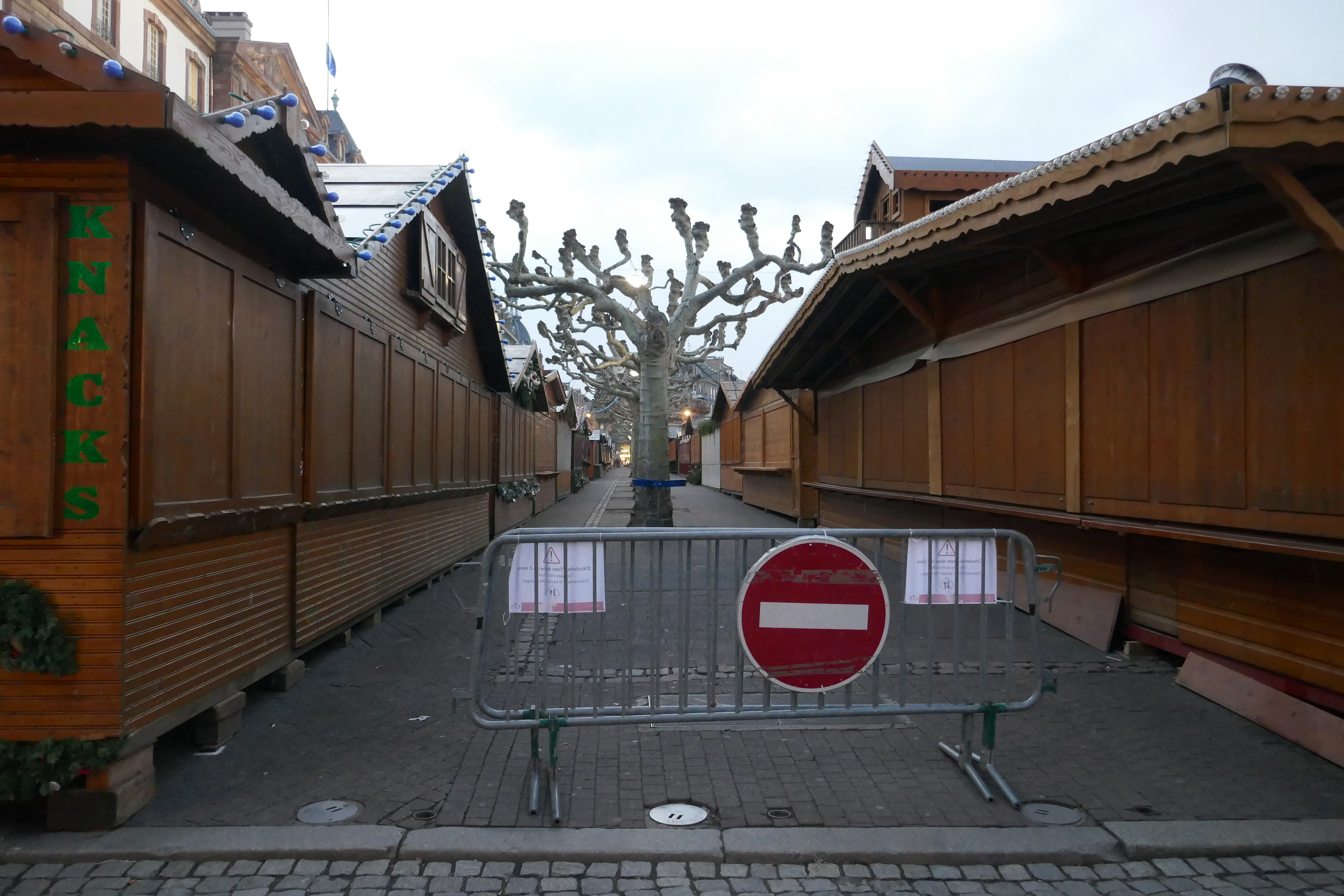
Place Broglie, showing a different Strasbourg Christmas market closed two days after the attack

The attack started at approximately 19:48 local time (18:48 UTC) near Place Kléber, where the Christkindelsmärik was being held. Chérif Chekatt entered the area through Pont du Corbeau at 19:45, then went through Rue des Orfèvres, opening fire and stabbing people in three different locations, first at Carré-d'Or (Rue des Orfèvres), then Rue des Grandes-Arcades. Two hours before the attack, he visited the Christmas market to conduct a reconnaissance of the area.

Chekatt began his attack by forcing Antonio Megalizzi and Barto Pedro Orent-Niedzielski to kneel down in front of the Furla Shop in Rue des Orfèvres. He proceeded to shoot both of them in the head, killing them. Chekatt then fired shots at a woman as she ran into a passageway leading to the Place du Marché-Neuf, hitting her in the arm. Chekatt walked into the passageway leading to the Place du Marché-Neuf and encountered a woman with a friend. He shoots the woman in the chest, slightly injuring her. Chekatt walked through the Place du Marché-Neuf and entered the Sainte-Marguerite alleyway. In the alleyway, he encountered a man. Chekatt asked the man for his name and also asked if he was Christian, before stabbing him twice in the abdomen with a knife. The man would survive his injuries. Chekatt exited the alleyway and entered Rue des Grandes-Arcades, where he would walk north towards the Great Christmas Tree at Place Kléber. Along the way, Chekatt encountered a man with his family outside of an Adidas store. Chekatt shot the man in the face, seriously wounding him in front of his wife and children. Just after shooting the man, Chekatt fired at a woman walking with her friend. He shot her in the back as she ran away, seriously injuring her.

Chekatt continued moving north until he spotted Ahmad Kamal Naghchband, who was with his wife and three children. Chekatt ran up to Naghchband and fatally shot him in the head. Chekatt turned south and moved down Rue du Vieux Marché aux Grains before entering Rue du Saumon. At Rue du Saumon, Chekatt fatally shot Pascal Verdenne outside of an Italian restaurant. Chekatt continued moving west and crossed the tram-line of Rue des Francs-Bourgeois at 19:52. He then moved south before turning west into Rue de la Demi Lune. At Rue de la Demi Lune, Chekatt shot a woman in the leg before moving towards Rue Sainte-Hélène.

At Rue Sainte-Hélène, Chekatt encountered three musicians outside of the Les Savons d'Hélène restaurant. Chekatt opened fire and shot one of the musicians in the back of his head, injuring him. Emerging out of Rue des Drapiers, four soldiers of Opération Sentinelle intercepted Chekatt just after he shot the musician. Chekatt then exchanged fire with the soldiers; a soldier was hit in the hand, and Chekatt was shot in the arm. The second musician outside the restaurant tackled Chekatt just after the exchange of gunfire. As Chekatt was on the ground, he pulled out a knife and started stabbing the musician several times in the back. During the struggle, the third musician tried to disarm Chekatt. However, Chekatt was able to get up and stabbed the third musician in the right shoulder blade.

After the gunfight and scuffle, Chekatt ran down Rue du Savon towards the Pont Saint-Martin bridge. He crossed Grand'Rue before running down Rue du Bouclier. Eventually, he reached the bridge. At the bridge, Chekatt encountered Anupong Suebsamarn, a Thai tourist on vacation with his wife. Chekatt fatally shot the Thai man in the head. A man who witnessed Suebsamarn's death tried running away from Chekatt but was injured with a shot to the neck, making him the last victim of the attack.

The attack lasted ten minutes and took place in multiple streets, during which time Chekatt was heard shouting "Allahu akbar" as he attacked members of the crowd. A 45-year-old Thai tourist was hit in the head in front of a restaurant and died, despite a passersby attempting to resuscitate him; ambulances took over 45 minutes to arrive.

Chekatt then escaped in the direction of Neudorf and Place de l'Étoile, taking a taxi cab at Place des Moulins; the driver was unharmed and reported to the police having taken an armed and wounded man. Chekatt ordered him to drive to Neudorf. His testimony allowed the police to identify the gunman, as the man bragged about killing 10 people and having a grenade at home. During the drive, Chekatt asked the driver to treat his bleeding. The driver stopped the car at Rue de Belfort to retrieve tissues from the trunk at 20:08. Chekatt exited the taxi cab and took the tissues before walking away towards Rue de Saint-Dié. Chekatt walked west towards the tunnel of Rue de la Kaltau. In the tunnel, Chekatt encountered members of the National Police. The police fired a shot at him as he turned to run towards Rue d'Épinal at 20:15. At Rue d'Épinal, more police officers showed up and opened fire at Chekatt. Chekatt fired back at the officers before running away. The police would lose sight of him, starting a 49-hour manhunt.

Two days after the attack, Chekatt's gun was revealed to be a Modèle 1892 revolver which he obtained illegally on the day of the attack.

Initially, 350 personnel of the security forces hunted for Chekatt, supported by air units. Five hundred more personnel joined the next day, with a further 1,300 planned to join as reinforcements. The incident led to the closure of locations around the city, including the European Parliament building. Police used Twitter to relay information to the public. The French government raised their security threat level to the highest possible as the search continued, though Justice Minister Nicole Belloubet stated on Public Sénat that a state of emergency would not be declared for the incident. Five thousand people were stranded in a sports facility used as temporary shelter, and the European Parliament was put on lockdown. President Antonio Tajani tweeted that the European Parliament "will not be intimidated by terrorist or criminal attacks" and will "continue to work and react, strengthened by freedom and democracy against terrorist violence". The incident was declared an act of terrorism by French authorities.

== Victims ==
Five people were killed; two died at the scene and three others in hospital, while 11 others were injured, four critically. The first of the dead to be identified was a 45-year-old male tourist from Thailand who was shot multiple times and died at the scene. He was on holiday with his wife, who was also shot, but survived. The others were a French 61-year-old former bank employee; a 44-year-old local male mechanic and Muslim originally from Afghanistan who died two days later, Antonio Megalizzi, a 29-year-old journalist from Italy covering the European Parliament plenary session, who died on 14 December; and Barto Pedro Orent-Niedzielski, a 36-year-old French-Polish national who died on 16 December.

== Attacker ==
Chérif Chekatt
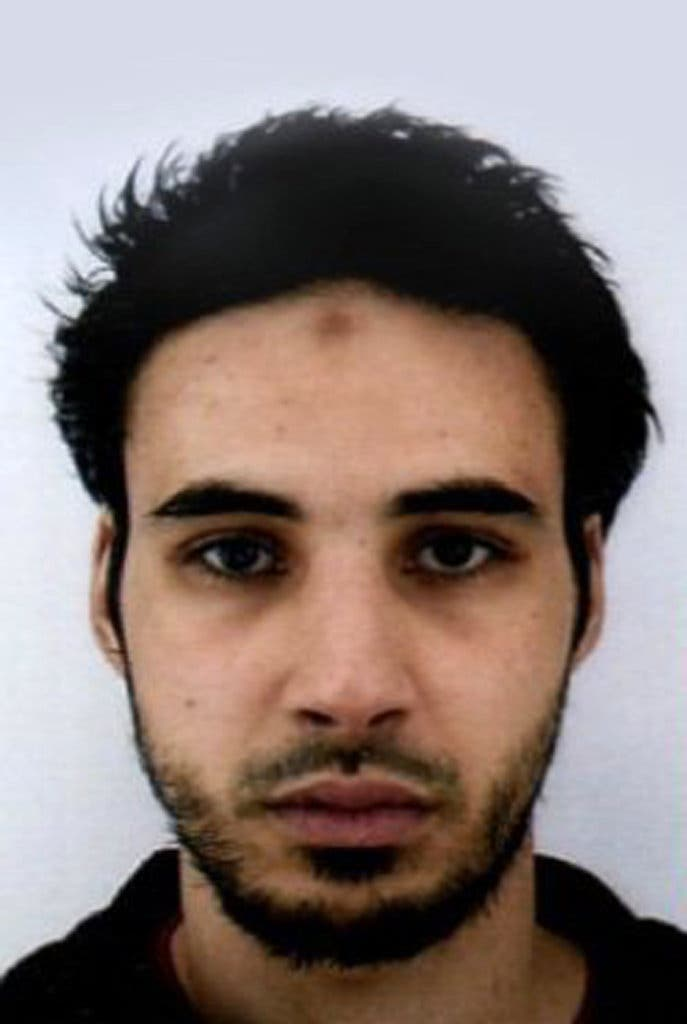
- Chérif Chekatt (photograph released by police after the attack)
- Born: 4 February 1989; Strasbourg, France
- Died: 13 December 2018 (aged 29); Strasbourg, France

The perpetrator was Chérif Chekatt (French pronunciation: [ʃɛʁif ʃɛkat]), a 29-year-old man born of a retired national French-Algerian delivery driver, characterised as a "hardened criminal" who "converted to rigorous Islam".

According to French authorities, Chekatt had been known to police since the age of 10 and he had his first criminal conviction by age 13. He was known to security services for a total of 27 convictions in France, Germany, and Switzerland, arising from 67 recorded crimes in France alone. His criminal activities started with petty crime, robbery and drug dealing.

French police considered him a "gangster-jihadist", a term referring to people convicted of various crimes and "radicalised" in prison. Chekatt was released from prison in France in 2015, then received a prison sentence for theft in Singen, Germany and was expelled to France after his release in 2017.

Chekatt was tagged with a fiche "S" ("State Security" file), a type of extra-judiciary document that French State Security uses to keep track of suspect individuals while not necessarily keeping surveillance on them. He was listed for his recent "religious radicalisation" and for "Islamic extremism". Neighbours said that he seemed quite ordinary, comparing him to his more traditional brother. His German lawyer told media that "he was just an ordinary criminal. It was no special case. We didn't notice any radicalisation." Secretary of State Laurent Nuñez stated that Chekatt had become a "terrorism apologist" in prison, but had not been expected to perform an attack. On the morning of the attack, local police had attempted to arrest him in relation to an attempted murder, but they could not locate him because Chekatt's father had warned him by SMS that the gendarmes were about to arrest him.

Investigators subsequently concluded that Chekatt had made extensive preparations for the attack. He told fellow inmates in 2015 that he would "commit a robbery before departing for Syria or die a martyr", and became "very interested in seeking weapons", according to a friend of the jihadist, Audrey Mondjehi.

=== Manhunt and Chekatt's death ===
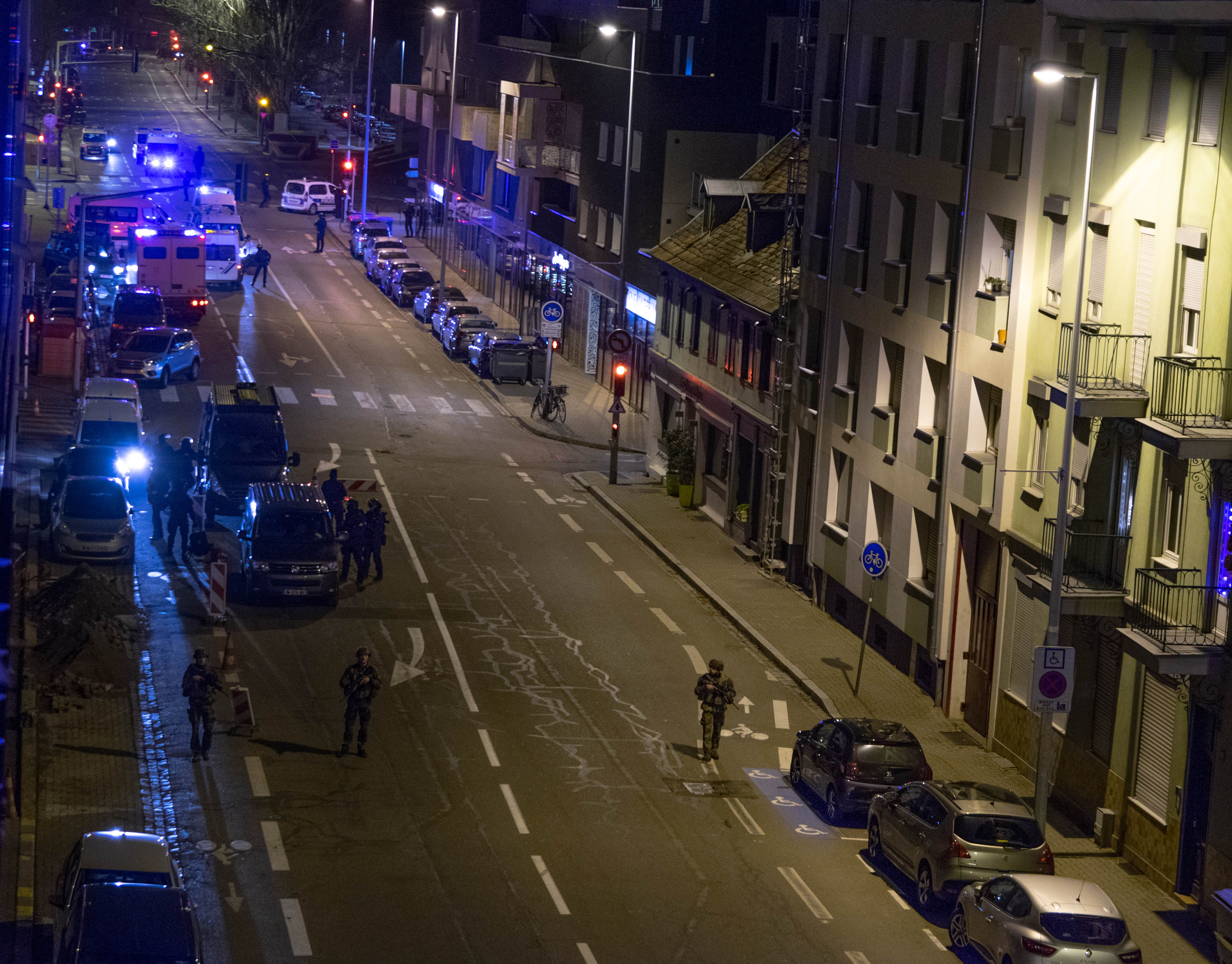
Police mobilized in Neudorf hours after the attack

An investigation was initiated for "murder and acts of terrorism in relation to a criminal enterprise". Four people close to Chekatt were detained for questioning after the shooting, namely his father, who is tagged with a fiche "S" as well because of his religious fundamentalism, his mother, and two of his brothers, both known for their local Salafist affiliation, and a fifth person was taken into custody on 13 December. A search warrant was issued in Algeria for a "very radicalised" third brother, who has his own fiche "S" record because of radicalisation and "contacts with Islamist circles in Strasbourg".

Chekatt was still at large after the attack, and an international manhunt began. There were some initial fears that he had escaped to Germany across the Rhine. Immediate efforts for the manhunt included closing the city's A35 autoroute that leads to Switzerland and Germany, a coordinated security reinforcement between Strasbourg and German state police, and suspending the tramway between the city and Kehl in Germany. Ultimately, more than 700 officers were involved in the manhunt. On 12 December at 19:20 (18:20 UTC), the French National Police released a photograph of Chekatt and asked for any witnesses to come forward.

On the evening of 13 December, police found Chekatt in Strasbourg between Neudorf and the Stade de la Meinau. He was trying to enter a building at Rue du Lazaret. He fired on officers when they tried to question him and they returned fire, killing him.

Soon after his death, the Islamic State claimed him as one of their "soldiers" through their propaganda outlet, Amaq. Christophe Castaner, France's interior minister, dismissed the claim as "completely opportunistic". In an interview for France 2, Chekatt's father said his son had been an Islamic State supporter. Nine days after Chekatt's death, a USB key containing a video of him pledging allegiance to the Islamic State was found among his belongings, judicial sources said.

== Reactions ==
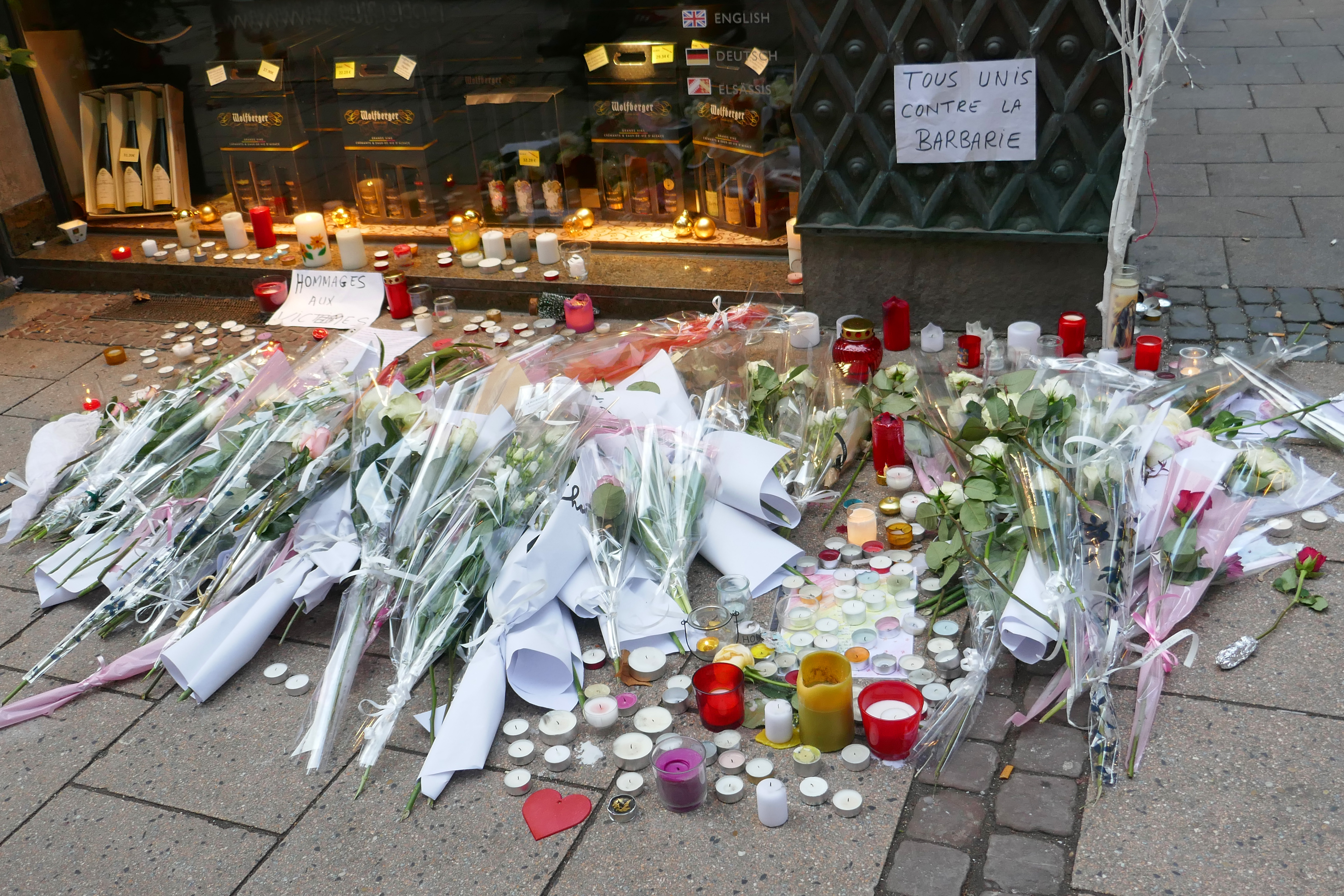
Memorial on Rue des Orfèvres on 13 December

The leader of the Rassemblement National (RN) party, Marine Le Pen, described the attack as an "Islamist massacre". Laurent Wauquiez, leader of the conservative party Les Républicains, called for a strengthening of the laws.

Border controls were increased due to Strasbourg's proximity to Germany. The Christmas market was closed on the day after the attack.

=== Conspiracy theories ===
Conspiracy theorists and some members of the yellow vests movement, which was ongoing at the time of the attack, commented on social media that the shooting was a false flag conspiracy by the French president, to distract attention from the movement's protests. This prompted angry denials from cabinet ministers, who called the claims "disgusting".

== Legal action ==
On 3 April 2024, a court in Paris sentenced Audrey Mondjehi to 30 years in prison for his role in providing the gun Chekatt used in the attack but acquitted him of the specific charge of complicity in the "terrorist murders", supporting Mondjehi's defence that he was unaware of where the weapon was to be used for. Two other suspects were also convicted of helping Chekatt and were sentenced to five years' imprisonment, while a third suspect was acquitted. Mondjehi expressed regret for his actions.

== See also ==
- 2016 Berlin truck attack
- 2016 Nice truck attack
- November 2015 Paris attacks
- Campinas Cathedral shooting, an unrelated attack which happened on the same day
