= Aubette (building) =

Coordinates: 48.5839°N 7.7457°E

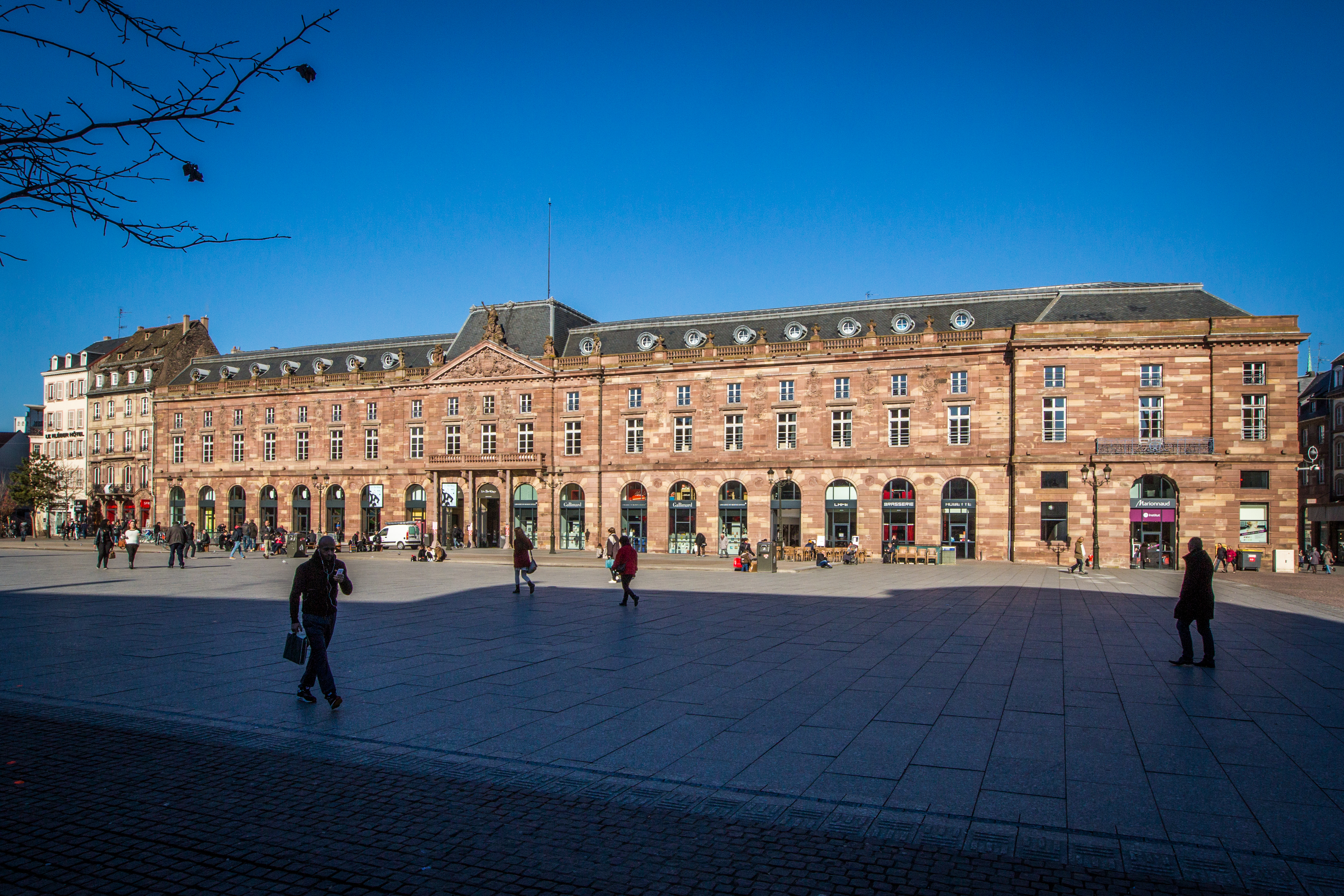
The Aubette on the Place Kléber

L'Aubette is a historic building on the Place Kléber in Strasbourg, France. It was built by Jacques-François Blondel in 1765–1772 on the site of a medieval monastery, but was burnt out in 1870. In 1926, three avant-garde artists, Theo van Doesburg, Sophie Taeuber-Arp and Jean Arp, were commissioned to create a new interior. The building is a historic monument and is open to the public.

== History before 1920 ==
L'Aubette originated from a monastic complex in the thirteenth century. Most of the construction collapsed in the sixteenth century and the remaining parts were used for military purposes. In the eighteenth century, in order to underline and reflect the contemporary French style, the architect Jacques-François Blondel was commissioned to re-build the remnants on the Place Kléber, creating a new building, known first as Obet and then as L'Aubette. This building continued to serve as a military garrison.

In the mid-nineteenth century, the building began to be used for education and entertainment. However, in 1870, it was destroyed by a fire. Only Blondel's façade survived. The ruin was largely ignored until the 1920s.

== Redecoration in 1920s ==
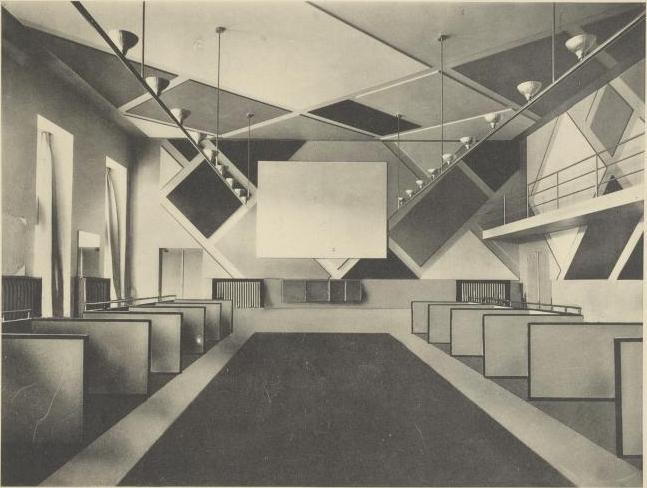
Aubette dance hall in 1929

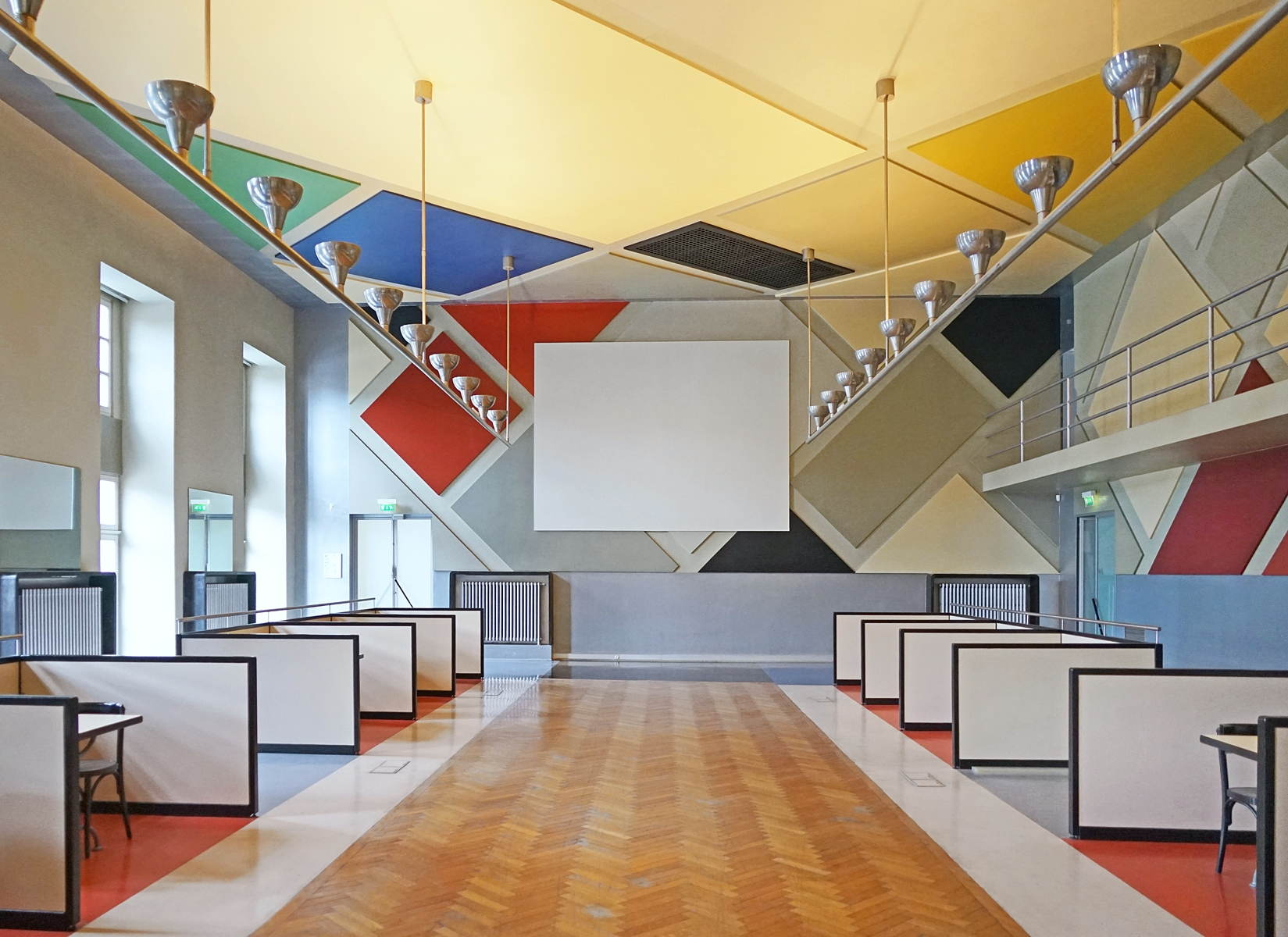
The restored dance hall in 2016

In the 1920s, the lessees of L'Aubette, the brothers Paul and André Horn, commissioned Theo van Doesburg, Sophie Taeuber-Arp and Jean Arp to transform the interior of the building to meet contemporary needs and give it a bold, modern look. The three artists were responsible for different sections of the building: Theo van Doesburg for the two cafés and two dance halls, Sophie Taeuber for the entrance hall, tearoom, and two bars, and Jean Arp for the basement, passage, and billiard room. All three artists worked together designing the stairwell. Their work has been called "the Sistine Chapel of abstract art".

Past artistic experience and background inspired the artists' work on the building. As the pioneer of the Dutch De Stijl movement, Theo van Doesburg employed his perspective on elementarism and the neo-plastic style to decorate the ceiling and wall of the cinema-dancehall with an orthogonal composition in primary colors. Sophie Taeuber-Arp and Jean Arp, two Zurich Dada artists, challenged the conventions of architecture using their aesthetic ideology. The three artists together focused explicitly on developing the relationship between the architecture and human body movements, putting the viewer into an abstract world. Emmy Ball-Hennings wrote of the interior:

The walls, covered with paintings, give the illusion of almost endlessly vast rooms. Here painting makes the visitor dream, it awakens the depths in us. The house may become a treasure box, a reliquary, and one can always look at it with new eyes. And since the image itself does not change, it is the spectator who lets himself be transformed by the image. It is like owning the lamp with which Aladdin lighted the marvelous cave.

In 1938, the interior was covered over.

== Restoration and current use ==
The cinema and the staircase were declared a historic monument in 1985, followed by the ballroom and the foyer bar in 1989. Removation projects were completed in 1994 and 2006. The building is now open to the public with free admission.
