= Christkindelsmärik, Strasbourg =

Christmas market held annually in Strasbourg, France

Christkindelsmärik
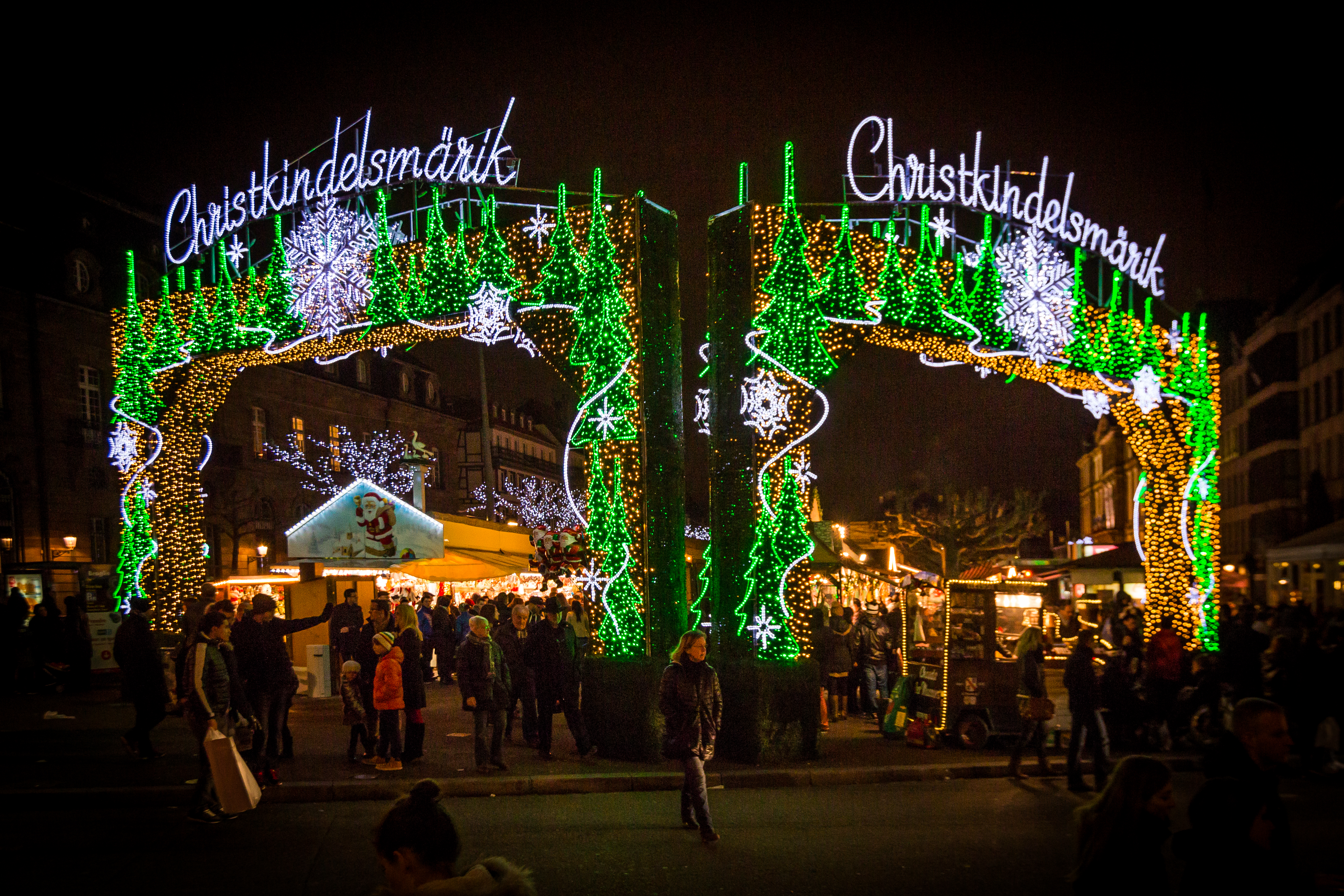
- Christkindelsmärik on the Place Broglie
- Genre: Christmas market
- Dates: 24 November–24 December
- Locations: Strasbourg, France
- Coordinates: 49.03691°N 7.9436°E
- Years active: 1570–present
- Website: Noel-Strasbourg.com

Christkindelsmärik (Alsatian dialect meaning "Market of the Christ Child") is a Christmas market held annually in Strasbourg, France, on the Grande Île, near Strasbourg Cathedral and the Place Kléber. It draws in approximately 2 million visitors each year. Hotels can be booked a year in advance and some receive between 15 and 17% of their yearly income thanks to the Christkindelsmärik's visitors. It is considered one of the most famous Christmas markets throughout Europe. It is estimated that the city benefits of a €16 million profit from this 38-day-long tradition. It is mostly famous for its fragrance of mulled wine (French: vin chaud; German: Glühwein).

== History ==
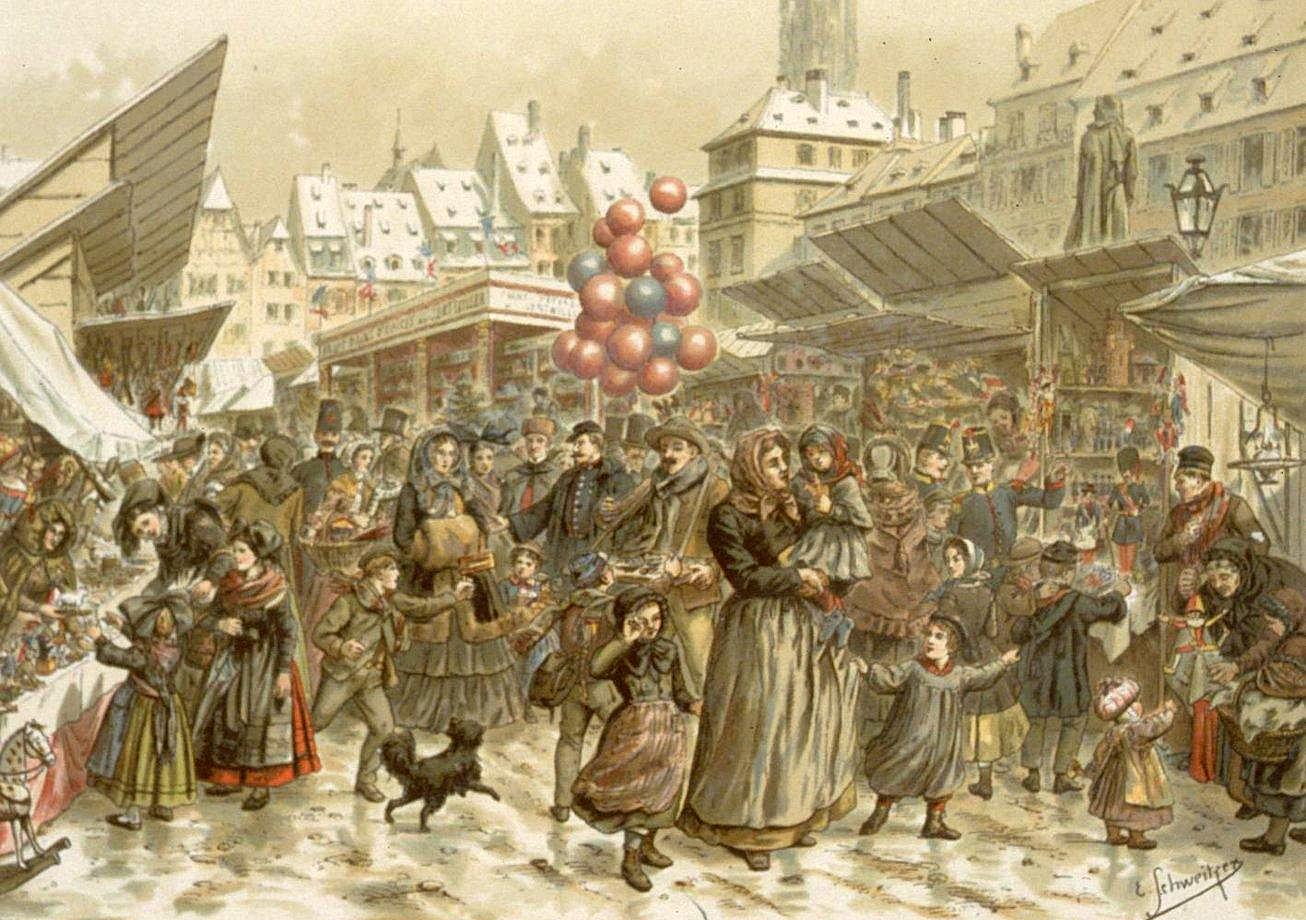
Depiction of the market on the Place Kléber in 1859 by Émile Schweitzer

Strasbourg has been holding Christkindelsmärik around its cathedral since 1570, making it one of the oldest Christmas markets in Europe. The name "Christkindelsmärik" is of Alsatian origin, a low Alemannic German dialect which was the mainly spoken language in the Alsace until the 20th century. In many parts of south Germany and Austria christmas markets (German: Weihnachtsmärkte) are also called Christkind(e)l(s)markt (the spelling depends on the local dialect).

The market takes place annually, from 29 November to 31 December. It mainly takes place on the Place Kléber, the Place Broglie, the Place du Marché aux cochons de lait and around the cathedral.

=== Shooting attack ===
On 11 December 2018, a shooting and stabbing attack occurred at the Christmas market, killing five and injuring several. The attacker, Cherif Chekatt, was injured during a shootout with French soldiers during Opération Sentinelle near the scene and shot dead by police in Strasbourg on 13 December. The incident was classified as terrorism by authorities, who identified the shooter as a known extremist who had been tagged with a fiche "S" (S file or security file), the highest warning level for French state security.

=== Planned bomb attack ===
There was an Al-Qaeda plan to bomb the Christmas market at the foot of the cathedral during the Christmas celebrations of 2000. This was discovered and foiled by authorities in December 2000.

== The tree ==
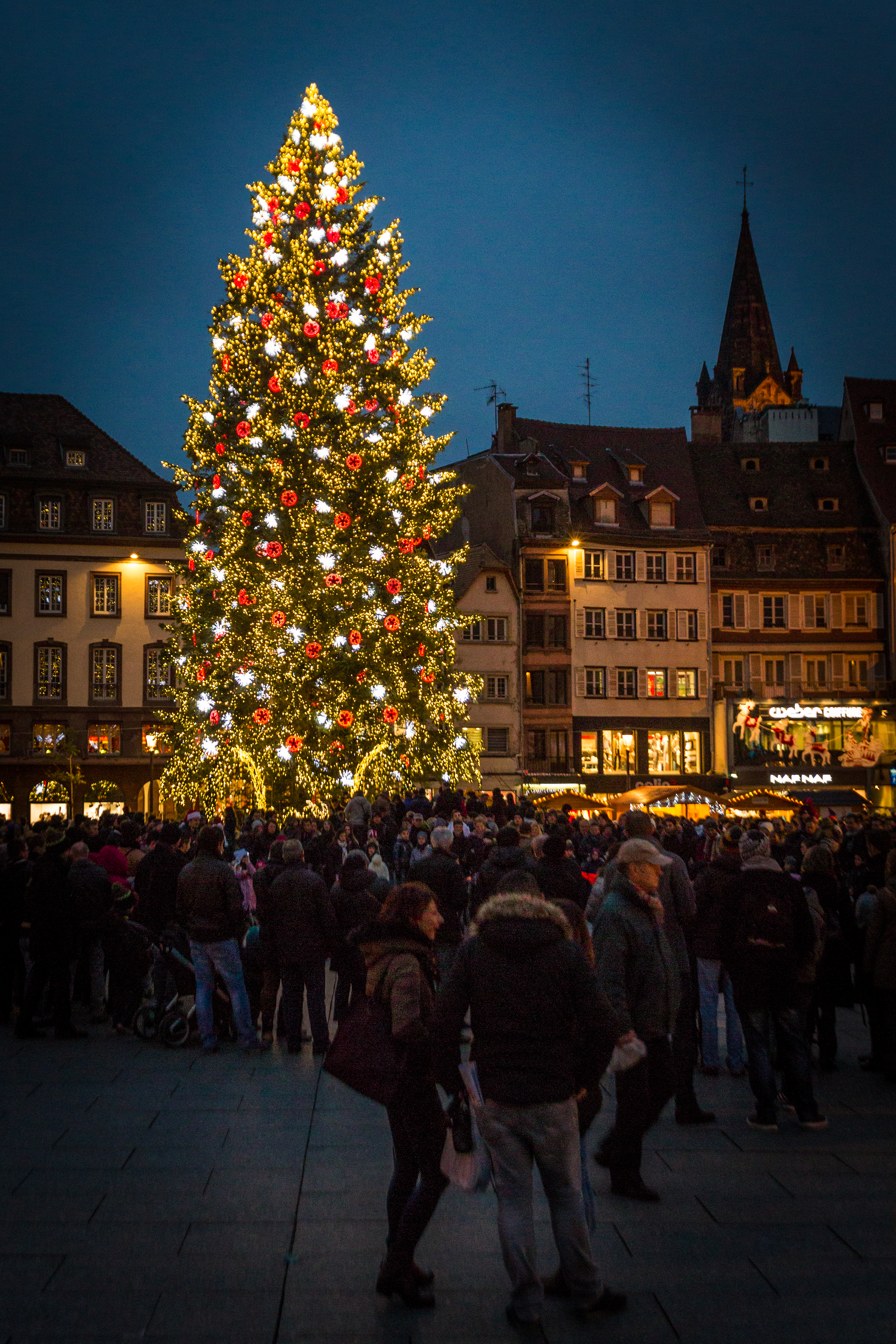
The 30 m (98 ft) 2014 Great Christmas Tree

The Christkindelsmärik's Christmas tree, on the Place Kléber, is traditionally of imposing height. Topping at 32.5 m (107 ft), the 2010 tree dwarfed much of its surroundings. The trees of the following years were only slightly less conspicuous: 30 m (98 ft) in 2011, 2015, and in 2018; 31 m (102 ft) in 2013, etc. At 35 m (115 ft), the 2019 tree surpassed even its 2010 counterpart.

== See also ==
- List of Christmas markets
