= Place Kléber =

Central plaza of Strasbourg, France

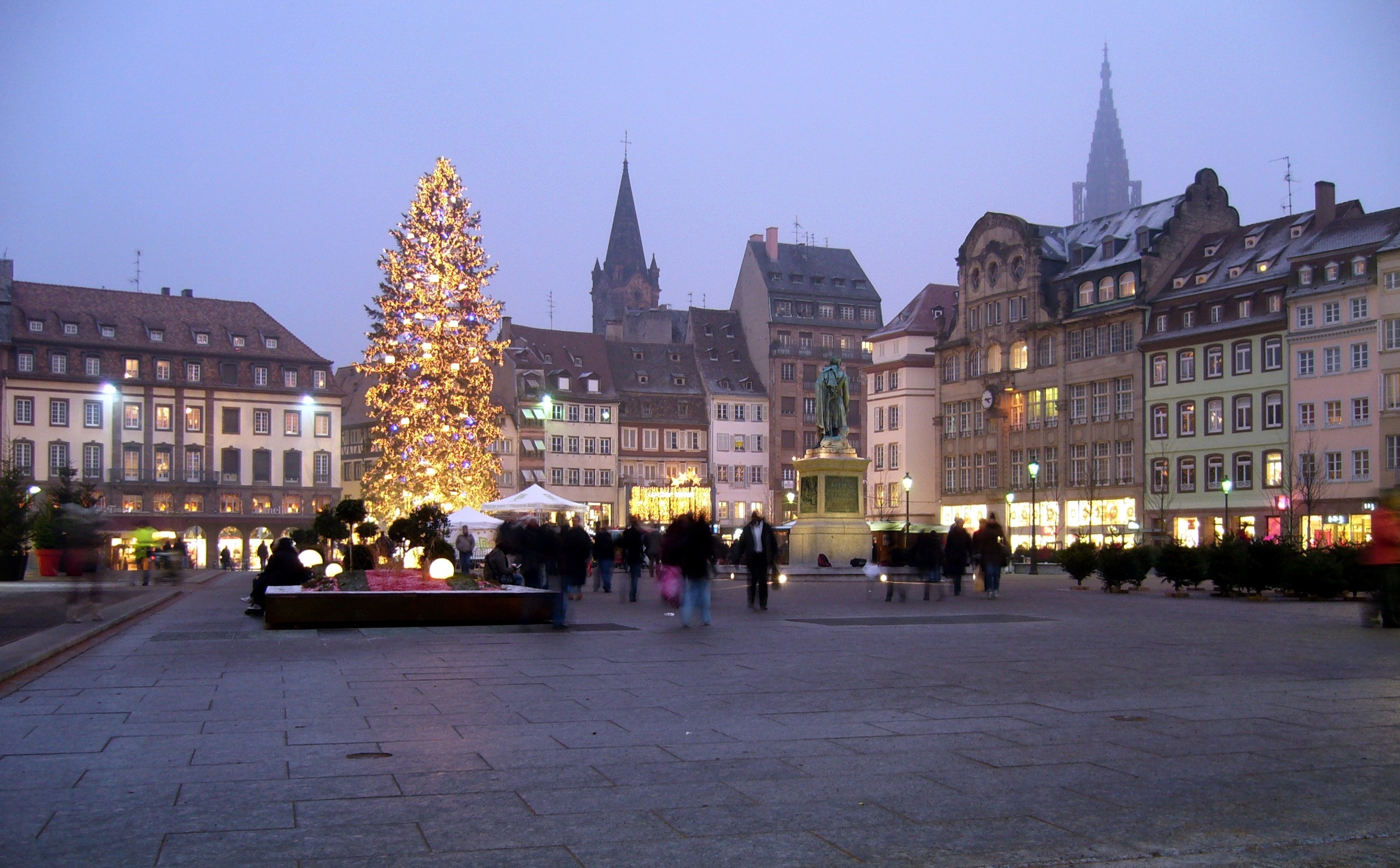
- Pictured in 2007, looking southeast
- Interactive map of Place Kléber
- Former names: Barfüsserplatz; Waffenplatz; Place des Recollets; Place des Cordeliers
- Namesake: Jean-Baptiste Kléber
- Location: Strasbourg, Alsace, France
- Coordinates: 48.583517°N 7.745765°E
- East: Rue des Grandes Arcades
- South: Place Kléber
- West: Place Kléber

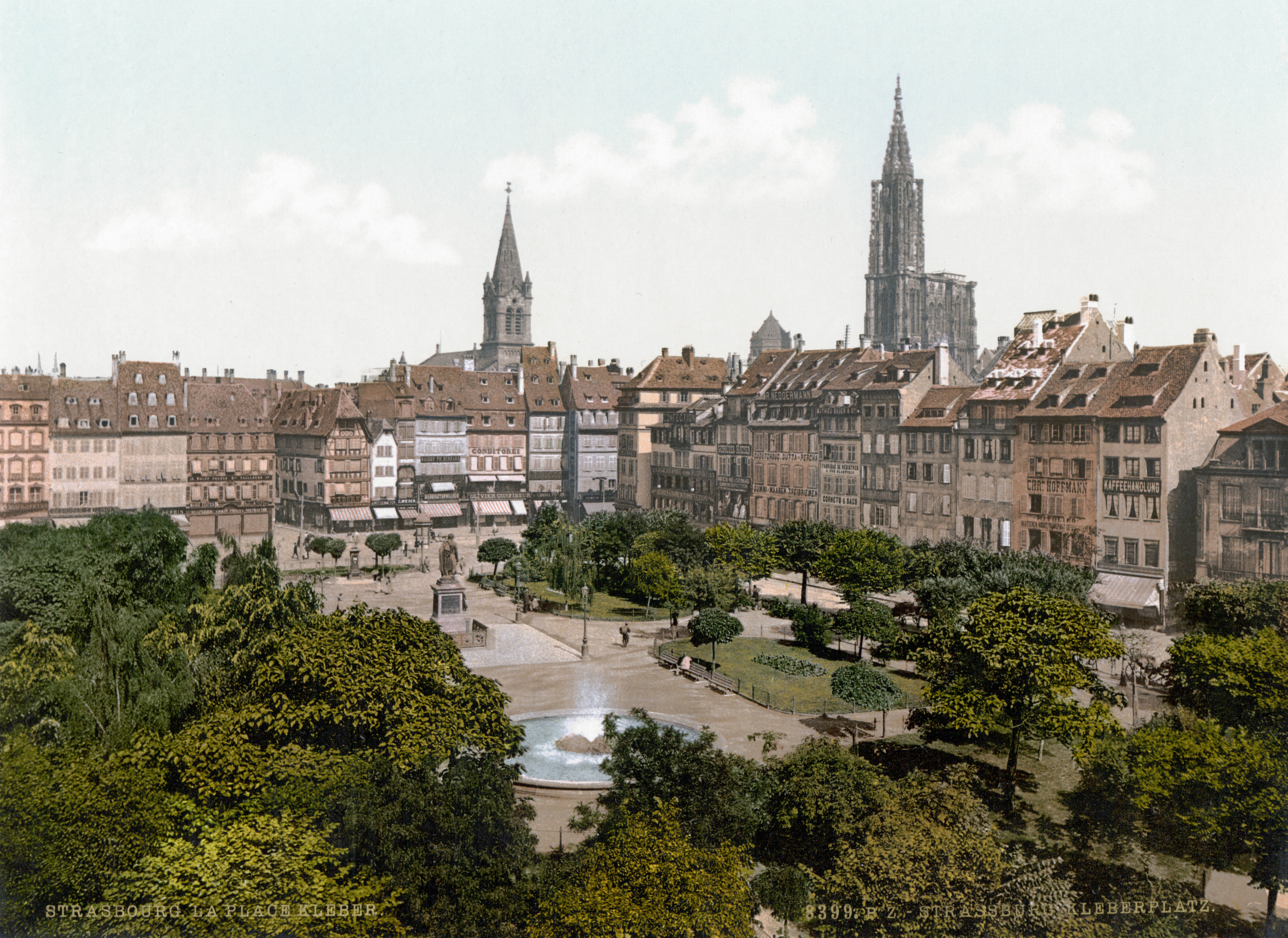
The Place Kléber in 1900

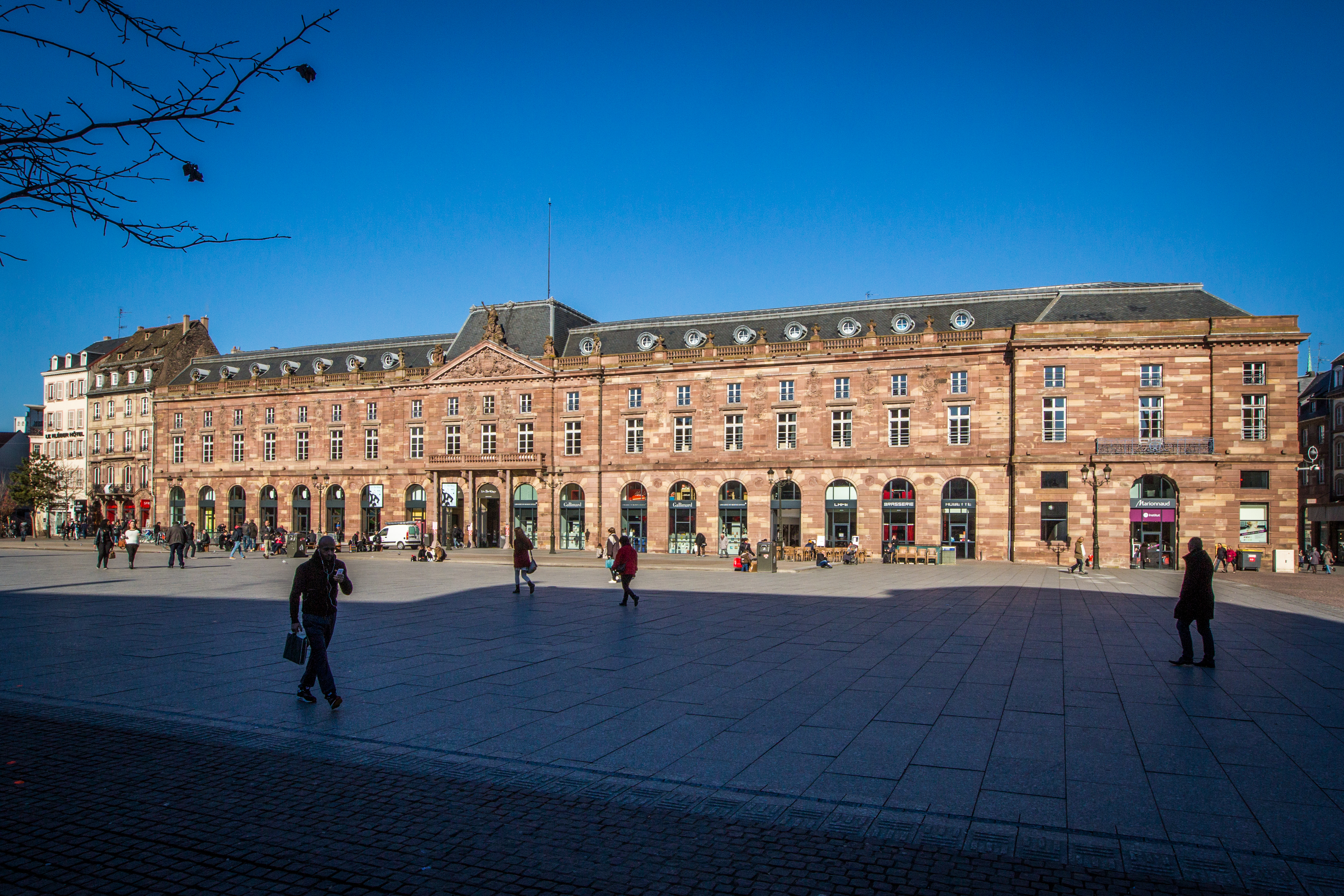
L'Aubette in 2014

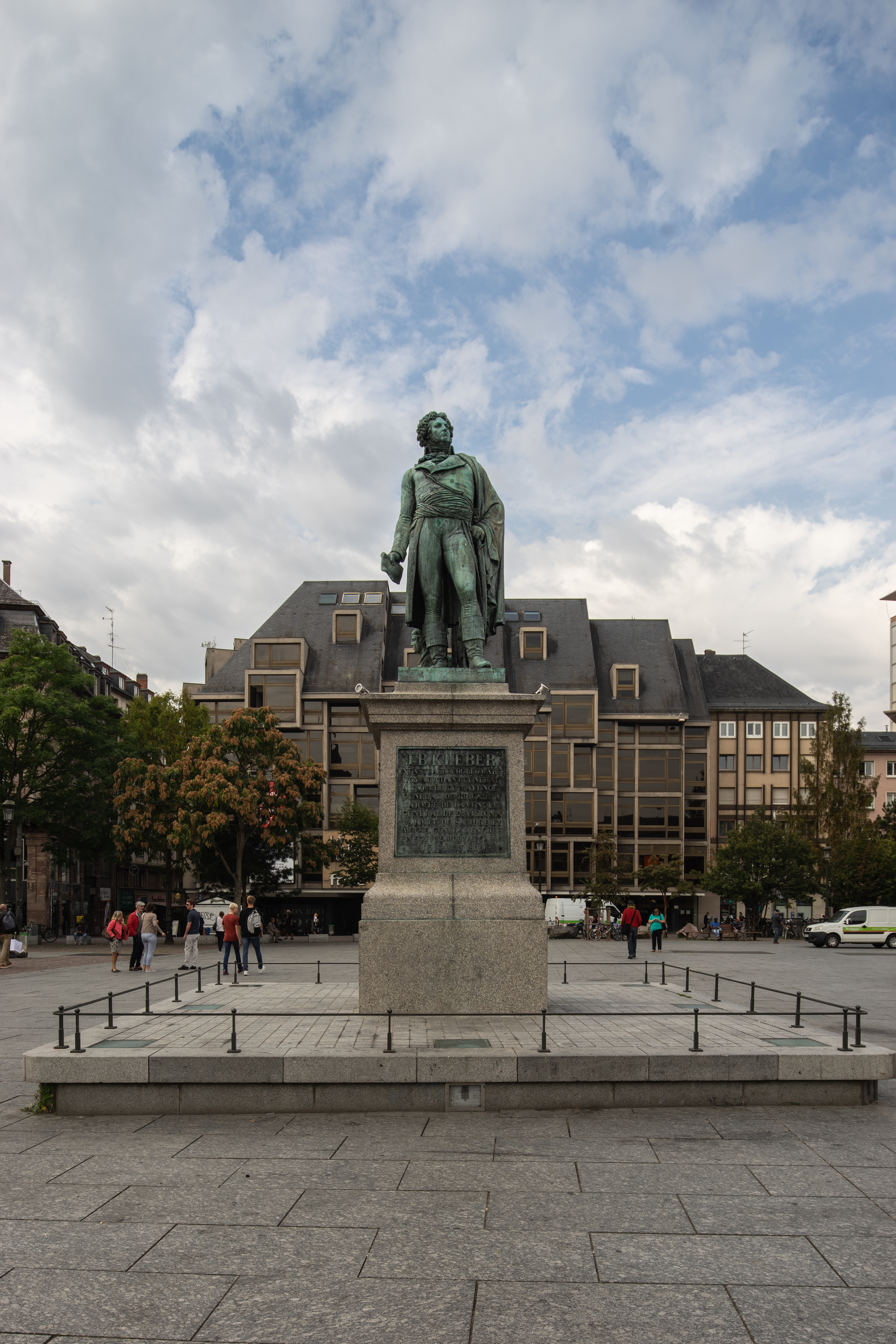
Statue of Jean-Baptiste Kléber

The Place Kléber (Kleberplatz in German) is the central square of Strasbourg, France. As the largest square at the centre of Strasbourg, in the heart of the city's commercial area, it was named after French revolutionary general Jean-Baptiste Kléber, born in Strasbourg in 1753. In the square is a statue of Kléber, under which is a vault containing his remains. On the north side of the square is the Aubette (Orderly Room), built by Blondel in 1765–1772.

Located in Strasbourg's historic centre, the Grande Île ("Large Island"), the area was classified a World Heritage Site by UNESCO in 1988, the first time such an honor was placed on an entire city centre.

== History ==
The first name of the Place Kléber was Barfüsserplatz ('Square of the Barefoot Nuns' in German) because a Franciscan monastery was standing along the square). In the 17th century, the name changed to Waffenplatz ('Arms Square' in German). On 24 June 1840, the square was finally renamed for the French general Jean-Baptiste Kléber, also going by 'Kleberplatz' after German annexation.

During German occupation in 1940–1944, the place was renamed after Karl Roos, a local ethnically German politician executed by French authorities in 1940 on the charges of espionage for Germany.

The square has also been named Place des Recollets and Place des Cordeliers.

== The Aubette ==
The Aubette was built in 1765–1772 by Jacques François Blondel, architect to King Louis XV.

In 2006, after a long and careful restoration, the inner decoration of the Aubette, made in the 1920s by Hans Arp, Theo van Doesburg, and Sophie Taeuber-Arp and destroyed in the 1930s, was made accessible to the public again. The work of the three artists had been called "the Sistine Chapel of abstract art".

== The statue of Kléber ==
After his assassination in 1800 in Cairo, the body of Jean-Baptiste Kléber, general during the French Revolutionary Wars, born in Strasbourg in 1753, was repatriated to France. Napoleon, fearing that his tomb would become a symbol to Republicanism, ordered it to stay at the Château d'If, on an island near Marseille. It stayed there for 18 years until Louis XVIII granted him a burial place in his hometown in Strasbourg. He was buried on 15 December 1838 below his statue located in the middle of the Place Kléber. His heart is in an urn in the caveau of the Governors beneath the altar of the St. John Chapel in Les Invalides, Paris.

The statue, designed by Philippe Grass, was completed in 1838.

== The Christmas tree ==
Traditionally, a large fir tree, around 30 metres (98 ft) tall, is erected every year in the southwestern corner of the square. Residents deposit gifts for the poor at its base. During Christkindelsmärik (Christmas market), the booths of around fifty charitable associations make the Village du Partage ("Village for Sharing").
