= Voodoo Castle (Strasbourg) =

Coordinates: 48.5804°N 7.7287°E

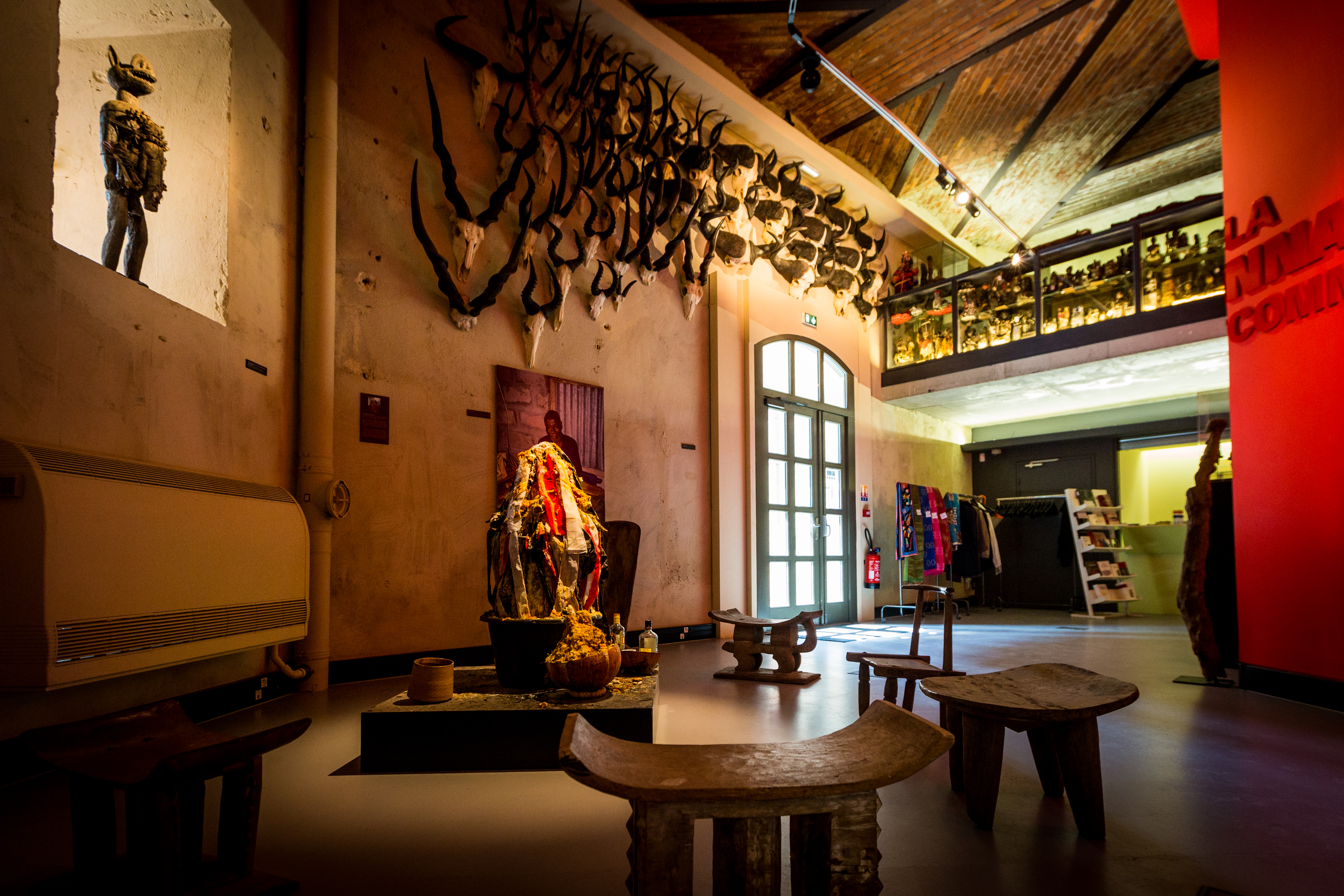
- The entrance hall of the Museum

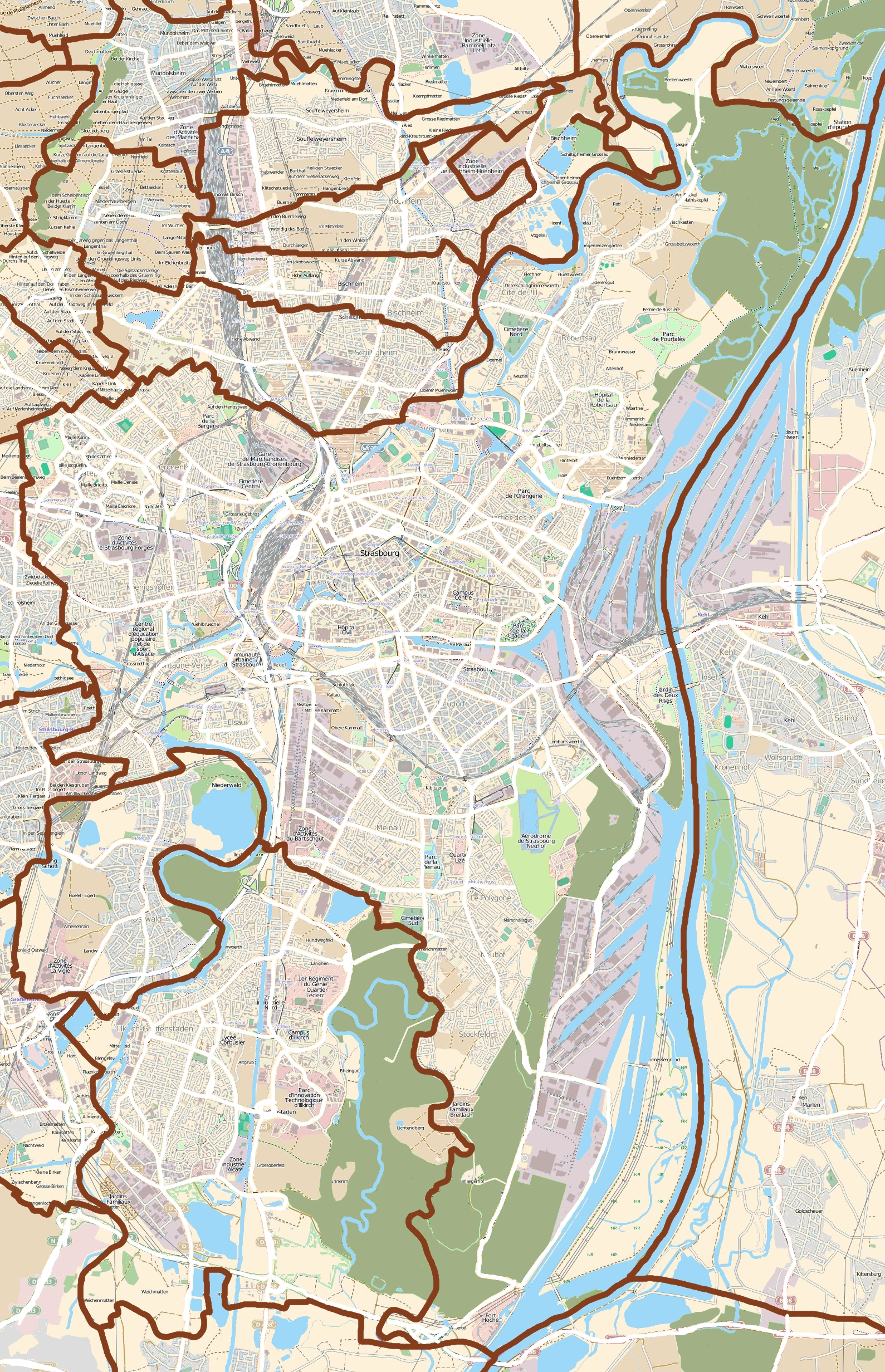
- Location within Strasbourg Location within France
- Established: 2014; 12 years ago
- Location: 4, rue de Koenigshoffen
- Type: Museum and castle

The Voodoo Castle (previously known as the Voodoo Museum) is located in the city of Strasbourg in the department of Bas-Rhin, Alsace.

== Description ==
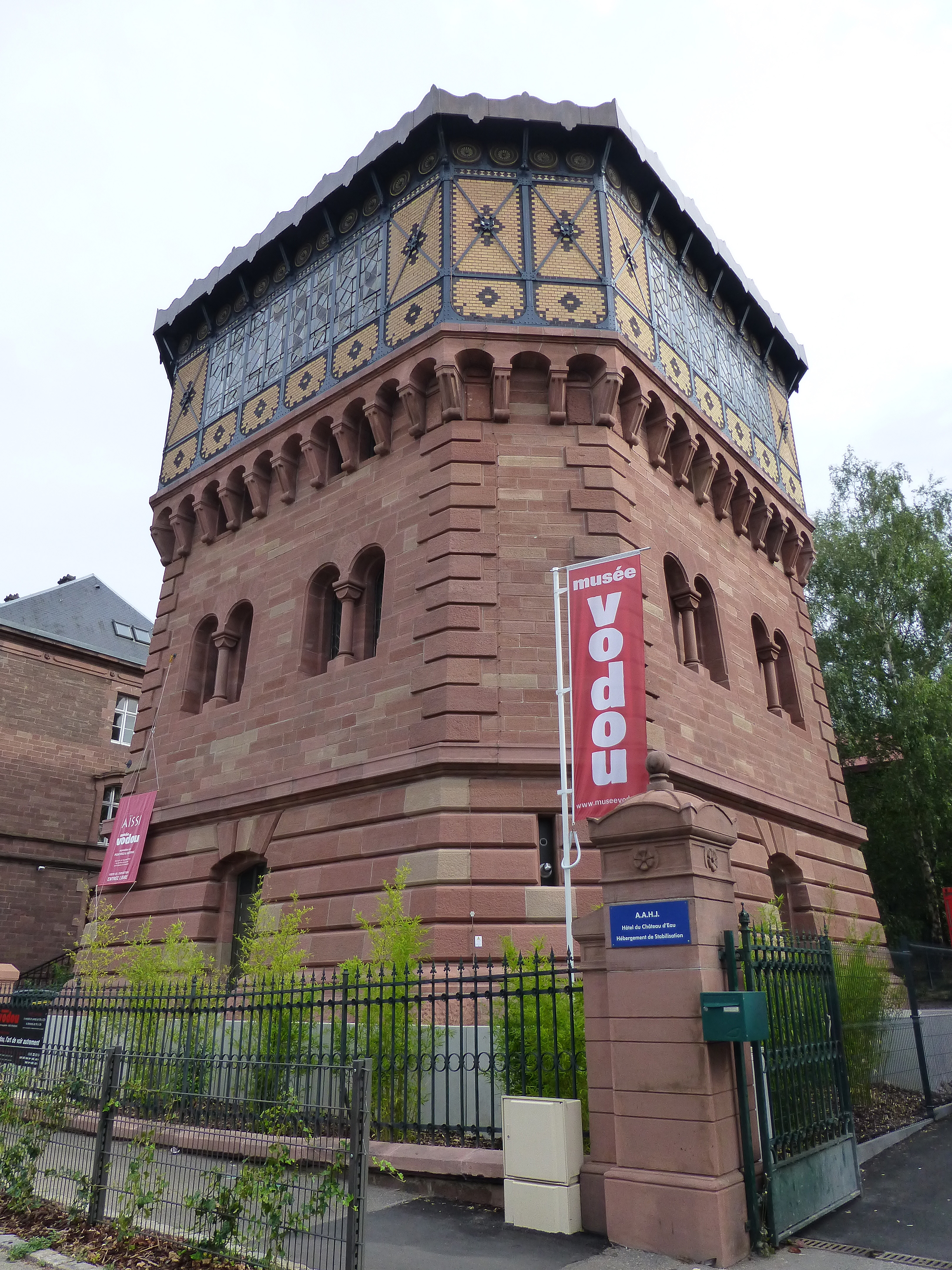
A museum in the water castle

Founded in January 2014 by Marie-Luce and Marc Arbogast and managed by a non-profit local organization, this museum presents one of the most important collections of private Voodoo art in France.

It is situated in the old water castle of Strasbourg, which was built in 1878 and listed as a historic monument of France in 1984.

The museum opens its doors from Wednesday to Sunday, from 2 PM to 6 PM. Groups larger than 8 can be accommodated outside of these hours with a reservation. The collection is also suitable for younger visitors.

== Collection ==
The collection, which is curated by Marie-Luce and Marc Arbogast, consists of nearly 1060 Voodoo objects originating in Togo, Benin, Ghana and Nigeria. 220 of these pieces are permanently on display at the exhibition titled "Voodoo as an Art to See Differently", or "Le Vodou, l’Art de Voir Autrement." It is by far the biggest collection of African Voodoo art pieces in the world.

The museum's collector has expressed the following words: "The Voodoo Castle is the manifestation of my passion for Africa, colliding with my curiosity in its traditional knowledge, chemistry, and hunting. […] Like my travels in Africa, I would like for this Museum as well as its collections to awaken supernatural meetings, grabbing always and still the curiosity for the human nature, in the spirit of creativity; it is there that presides the creation of such surprising art pieces, sometimes off-putting, but always profoundly human.

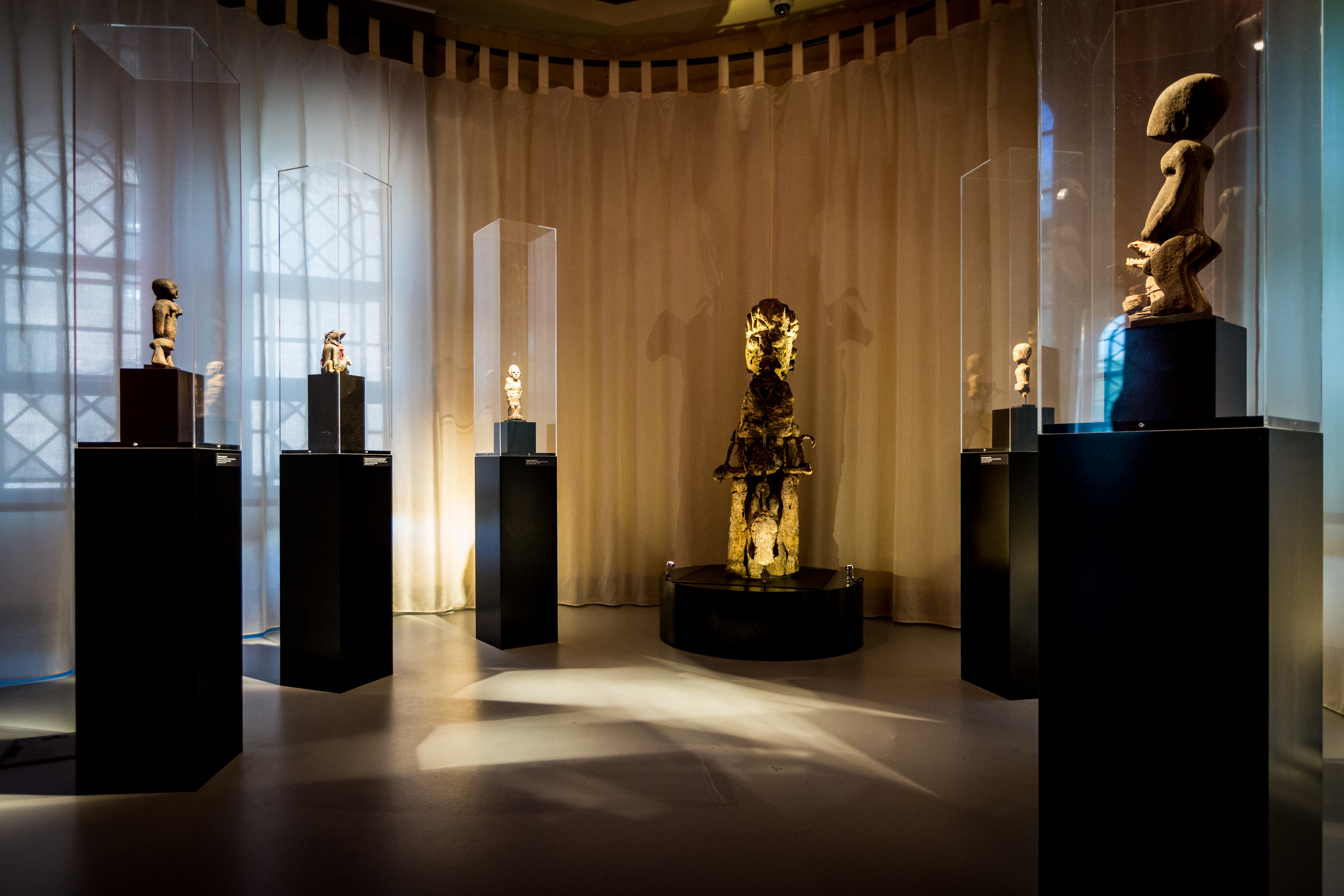

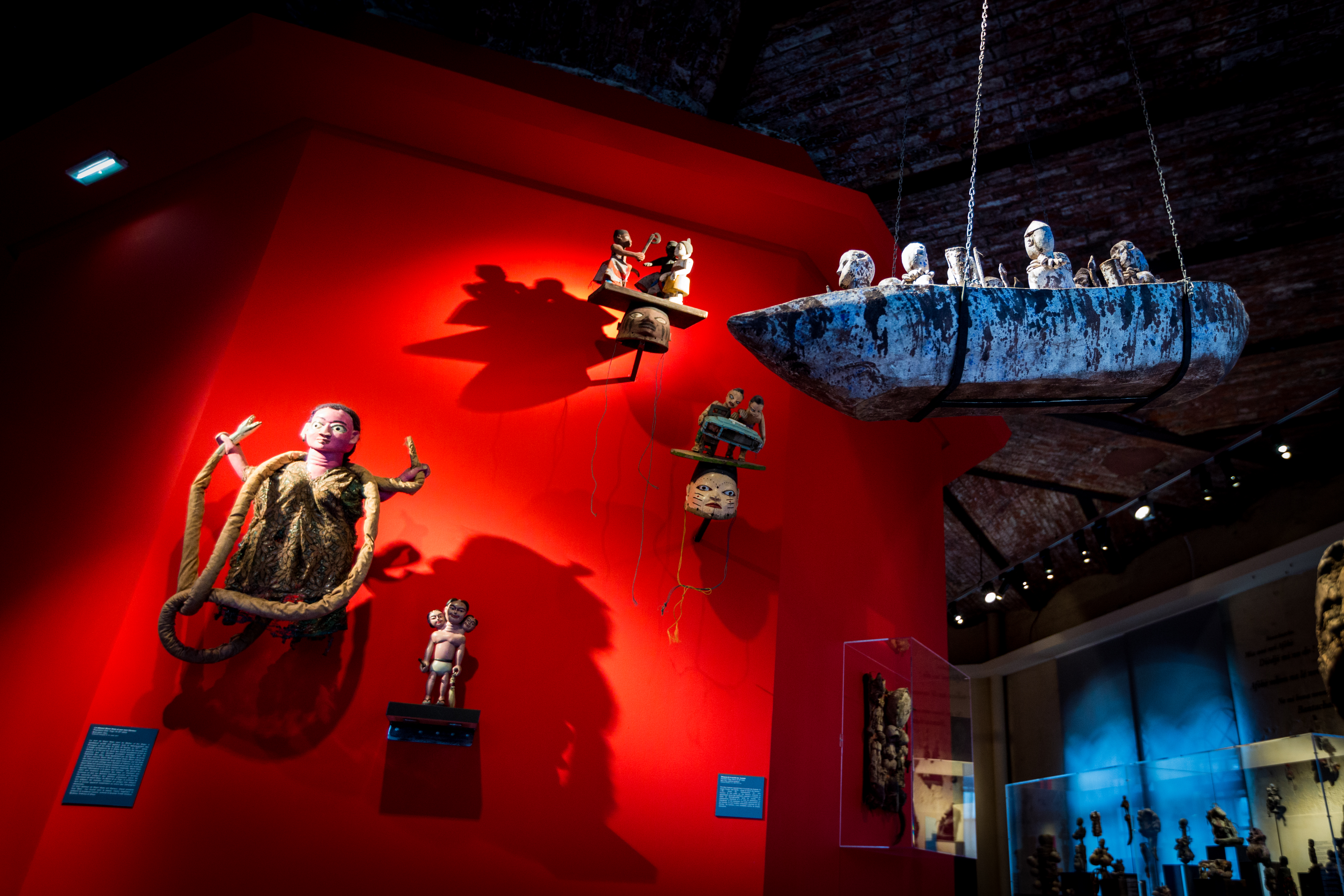

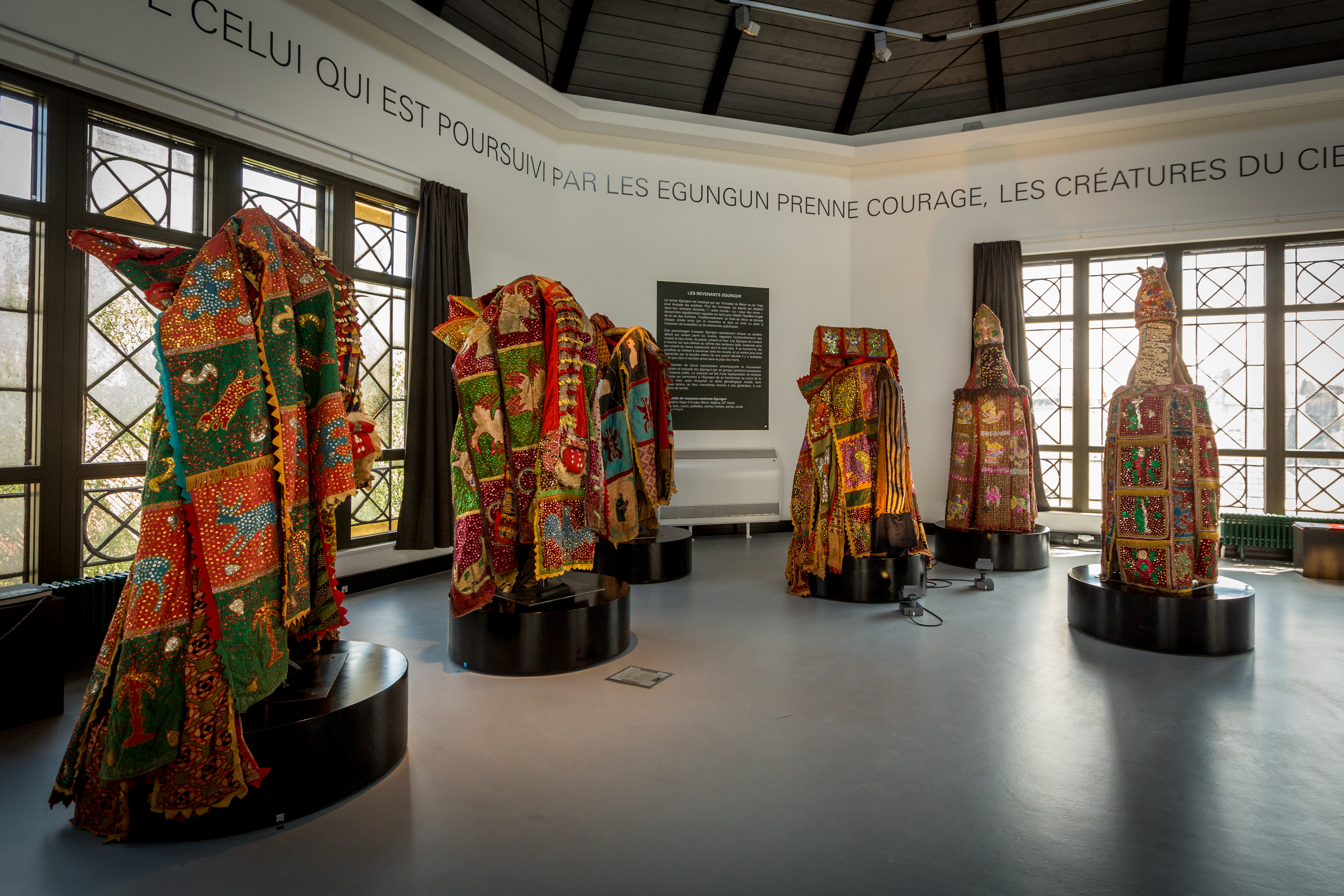
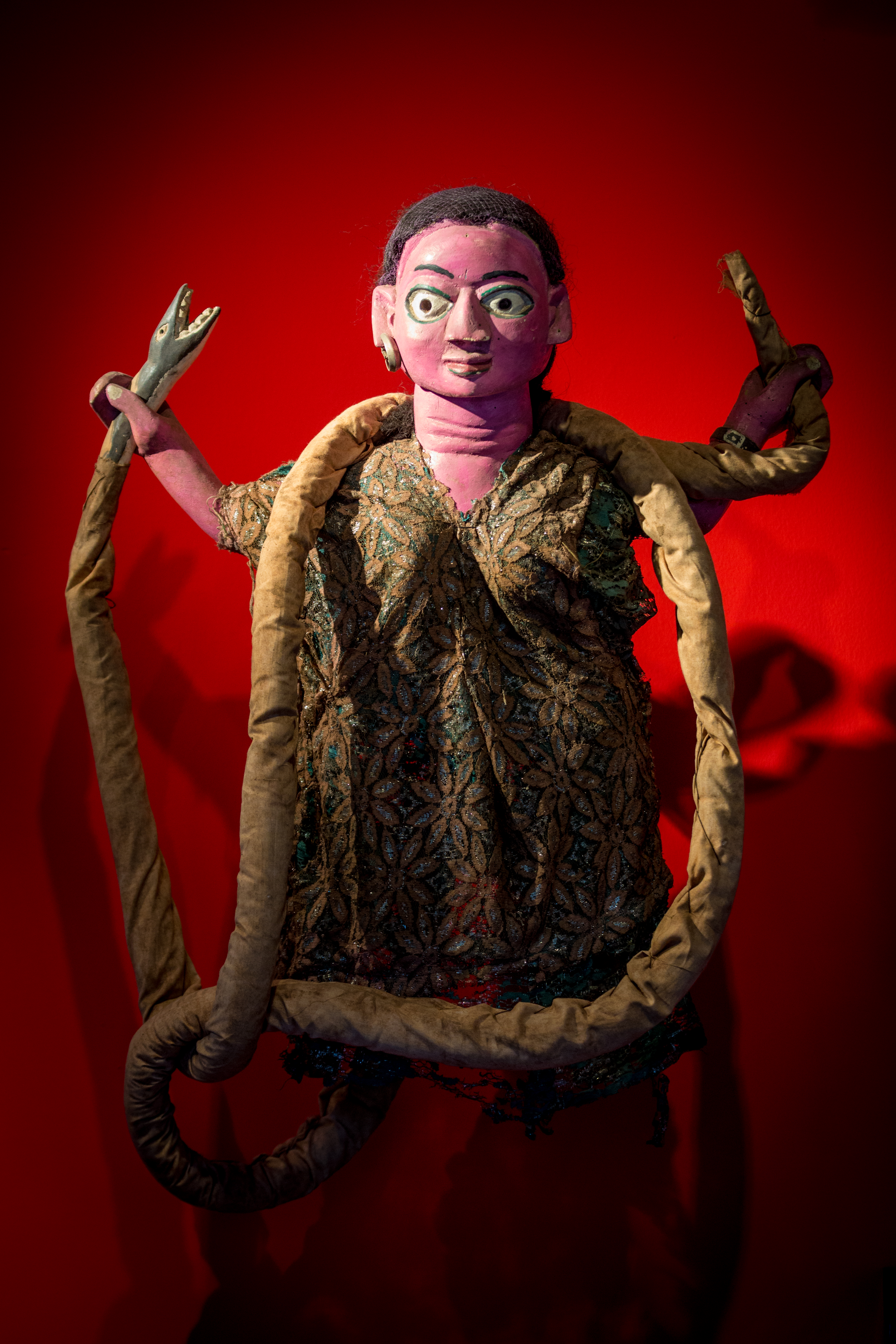

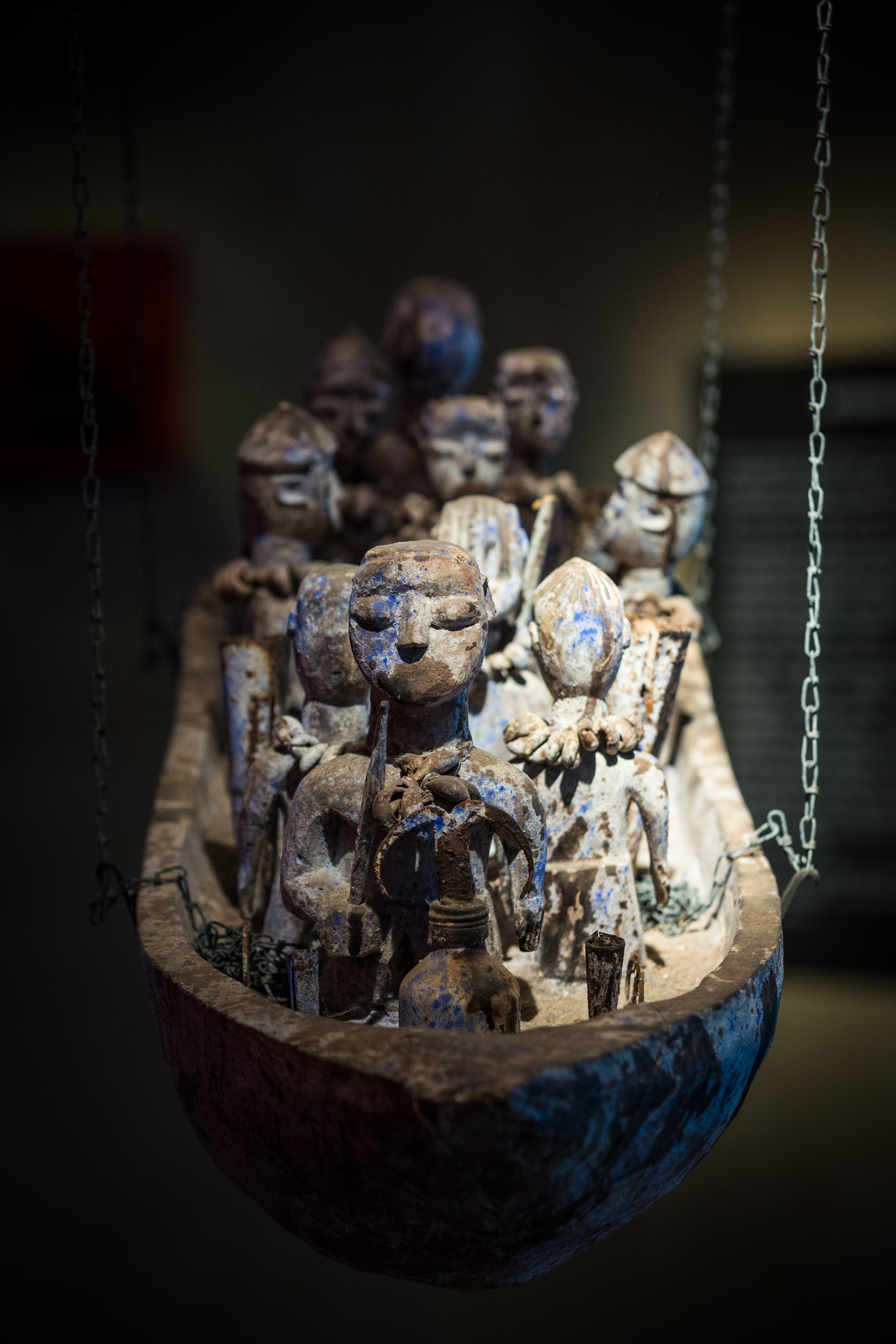

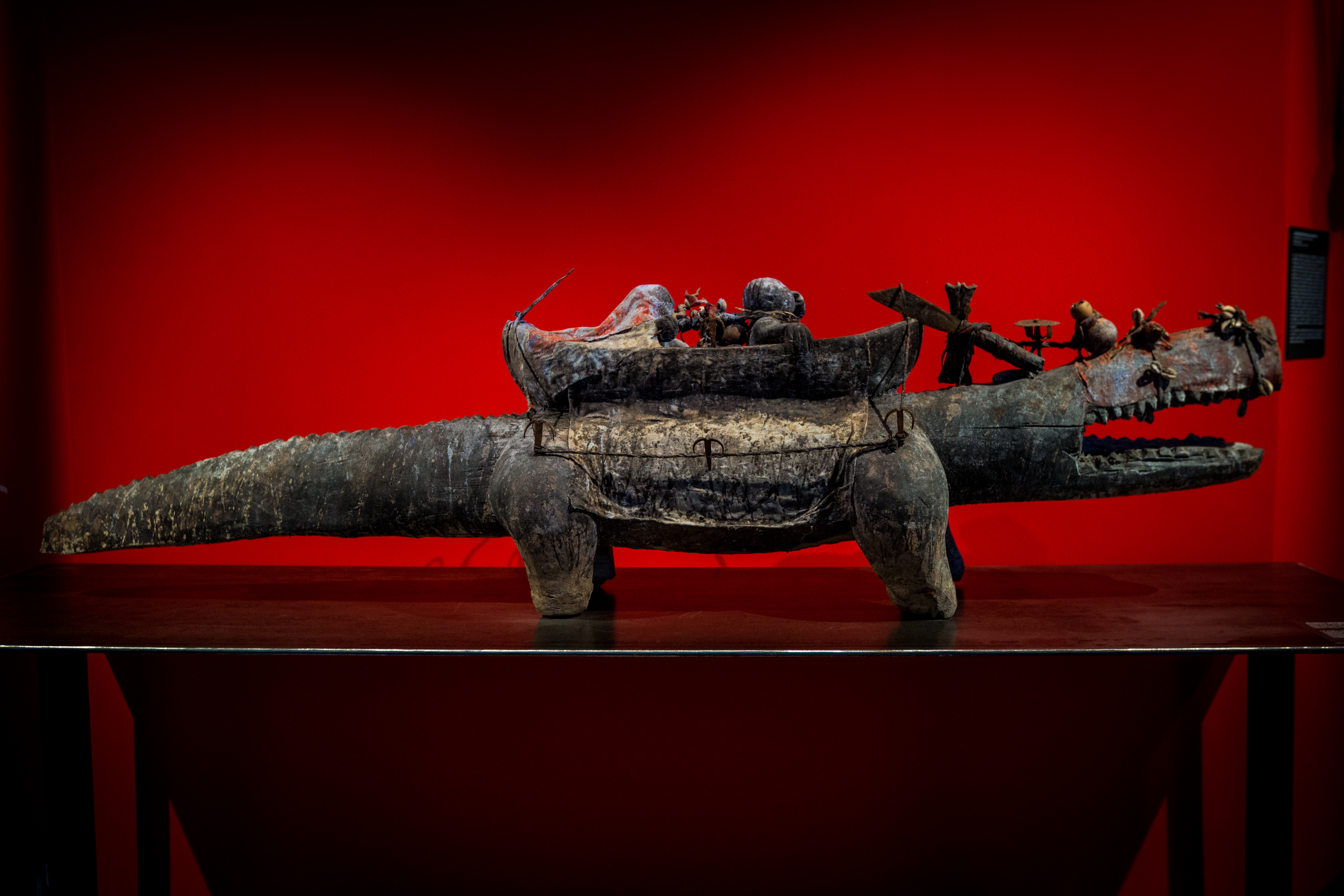

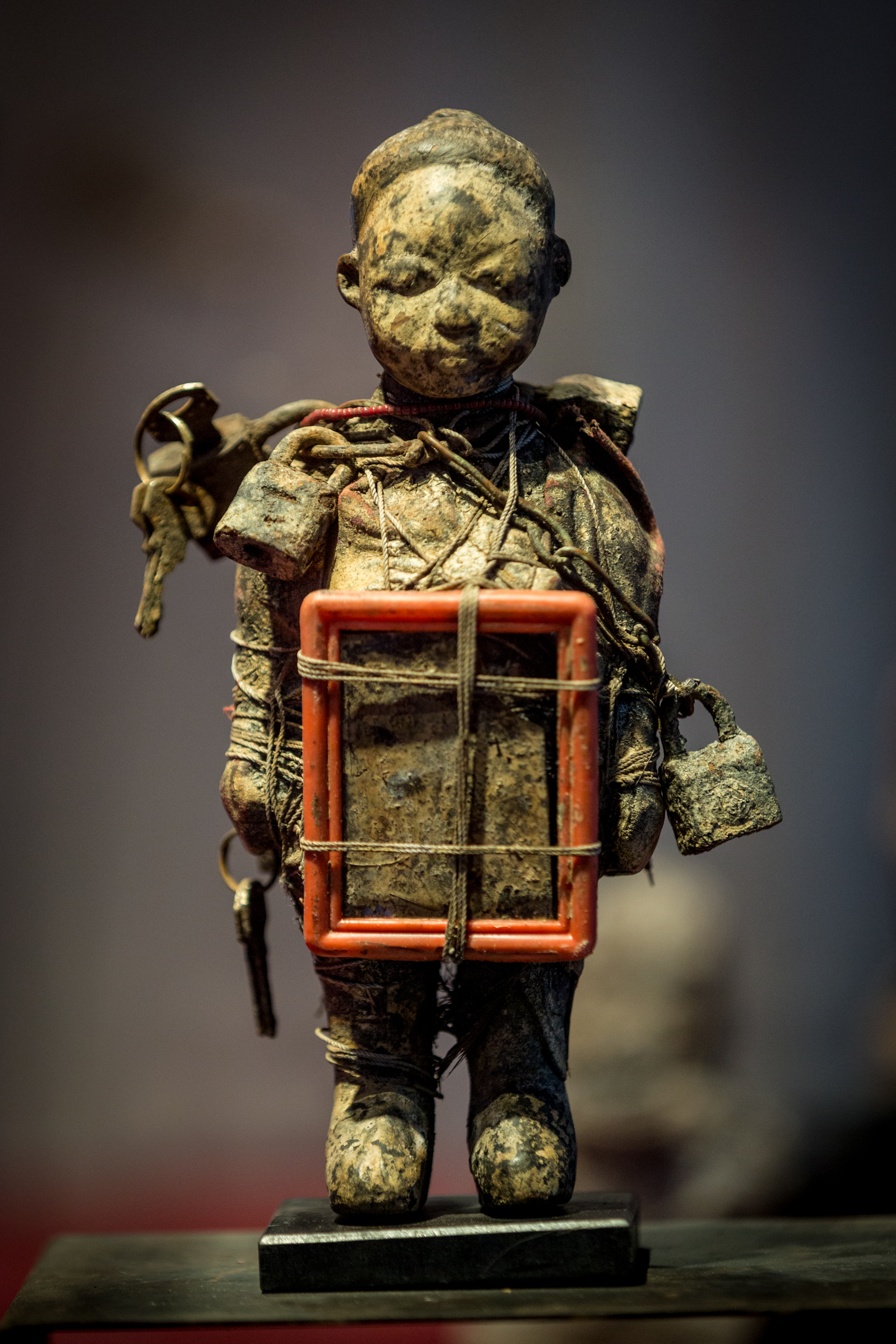

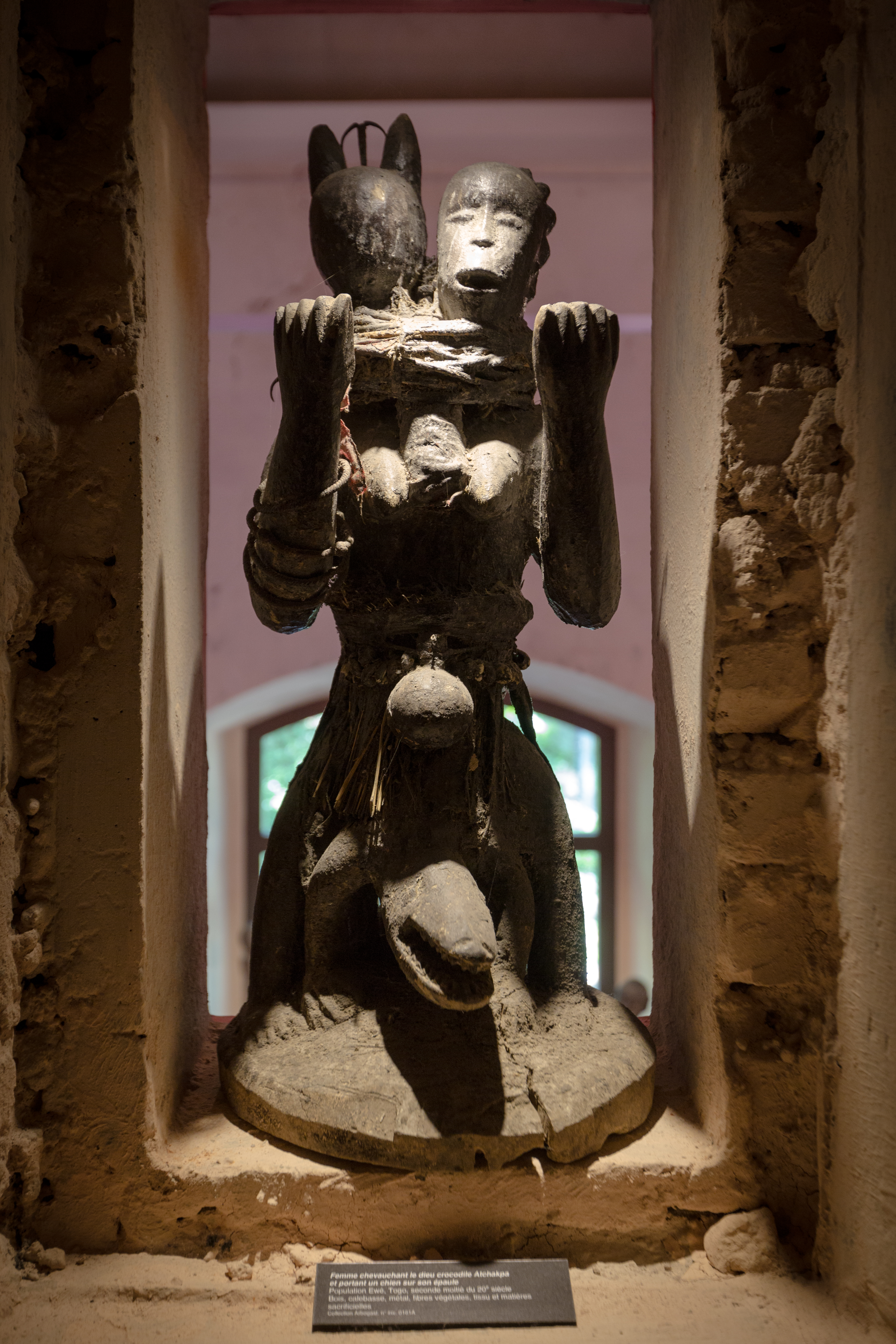

== See also ==
=== Bibliography ===
- Pascal Coquis, « L'esprit Vodou », in Les Saisons d'Alsace, no 64 (Les aventuriers), Summer 2015, p. 18-23
- Pauline Monteiro, « Initiation au vodou », in Cahier Vodou, ed. Association des Amis du Château Vodou, Strasbourg, 2015, 24 p.
- Bernard Müller and Nanette Jacomijn Snoep (dir.), Vodou : autour de la collection Arbogast, Loco, Paris, 2013, 271 p.

=== Filmography ===
Sur la piste du vaudou, a documentary film by David Arnold, for Bix Films/France Télévisions, 2012, 52 min
