= Greenwald family =

The Greenwald Rabbinic family was a family which produced several generations of Hungarian rabbis. It traces its roots to Meir Eisenstadt, the Chacham Tzvi, and the Maharal. The Pupa Hasidic dynasty is descended from the Greenwald family.

== Family members ==
- Moshe Greenwald
- Yaakov Yechezkiya Greenwald
- Yosef Greenwald
- Yaakov Yechezkia Greenwald II
- Eliezer David Greenwald
