= Gavriel Zinner =

21st century American Rabbi

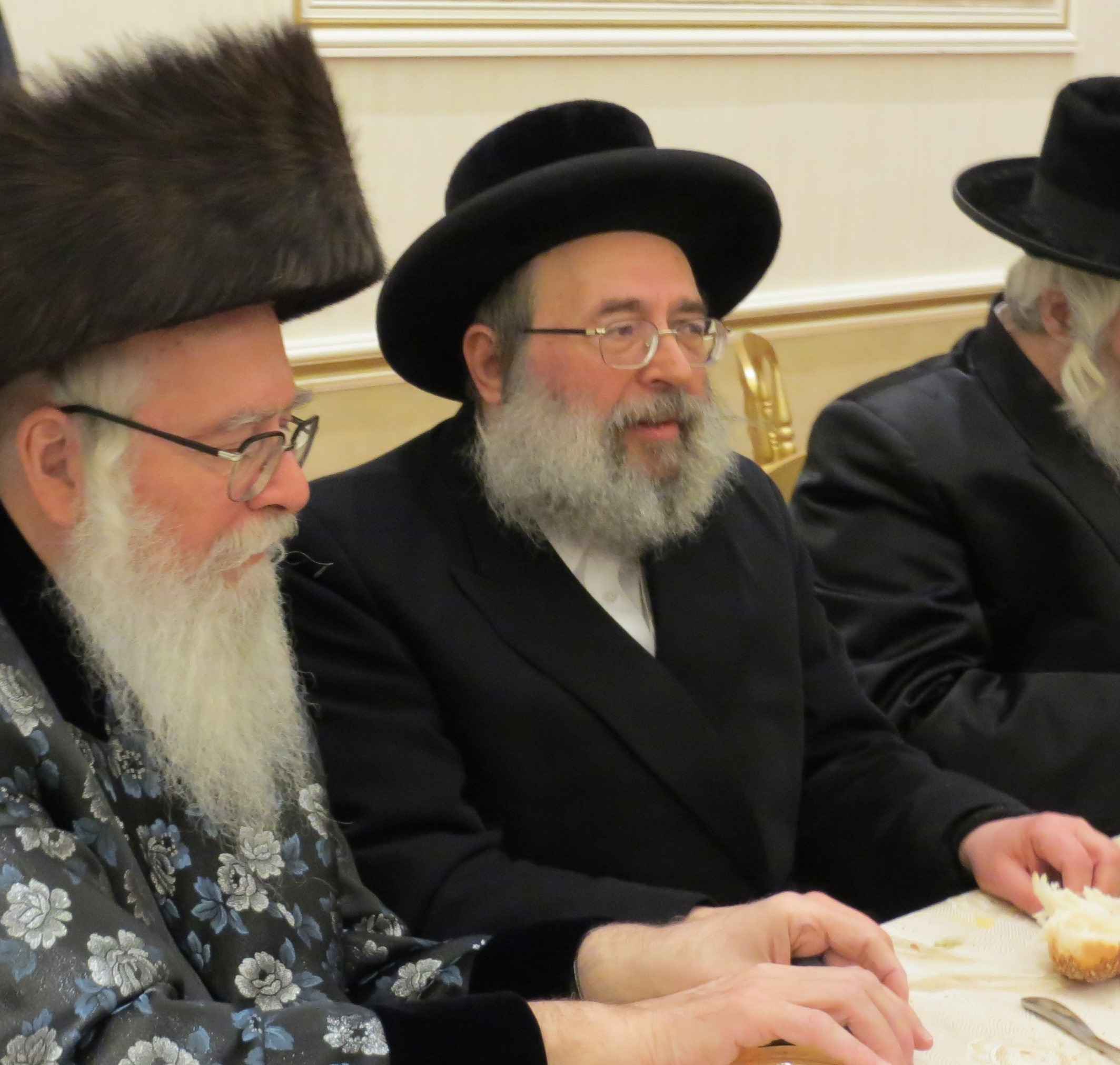
Rabbi Zinner, center, pictured with Rabbi Eliezer Shlomo Schick

Rabbi Gavriel Zinner ( גבריאל ציננער; also Tzinner, Cinner, Tsinner) is an Orthodox Rabbi in Boro Park, New York City known for his series of books on Jewish law, Nitei Gavriel.

== Biography ==
Zinner studied at the Puppa yeshiva and was a student of the Grand Rabbi Yosef Greenwald of the Puppa Hasidic dynasty. He received Hora’ah (ordination) from the latter, with whom he then interned for over 20 years. He married the daughter of Rabbi Yehoshia Friedman from Montreal, Canada.

Early in his career, Zinner was associated with Rabbi Menashe Klein of Ungvar, the well known posek (legal scholar), author of Mishneh Halachos. Zinner has also established connections with many other Gedolim, among them Rabbi Yaakov Yitzchak Neumann, the Belz Rav in Montreal. Zinner was close to the Debreciner Rabbi, Rabbi Shmuel Wosner, and Rabbi Fishel Hershkowitz. In the many visits he made to Israel, he learned from Rabbi Shlomo Zalman Auerbach, with whom he enjoyed "talking in learning".

Rabbi Zinner issues hechsherim (Kosher certification), with mark "NKG"

== Works ==
Zinner has authored over 30 volumes of Nitei Gavriel, (נטעי גבריאל, "Plantings of Gavriel") a sefer on the entire spectrum of topics in halachah (Jewish law). The works are known for addressing situations not commonly brought in other works; they also delineate the varying approaches amongst the Hasidic branches. For both reasons they are often reprinted.

In Jewish law, Zinner's tradition is to follow the Shulchan Aruch HaRav written by the Baal HaTanya. This was passed on to him by his mentor, Rabbi Greenwald, from his father, and to him in turn from his father, the Arugas Habosem. He also has great admiration for the last Lubavitcher Rebbe.
