= Posek =

Type of Jewish legal scholar

In Jewish law, a posek (Hebrew: פוסק [poˈsek]; pl. poskim, פוסקים [posˈkim]) is a legal scholar who determines the application of Halakha, the Jewish religious law derived from the written and Oral Torah, in cases of Jewish law where previous authorities are inconclusive, or in those situations where no clear halakhic precedent exists.

The decision of a posek is known as a psak halakha ("ruling of law"; pl. piskei halakha) or simply a "psak". Piskei halakha are generally recorded in the responsa literature.

== Orthodox Judaism ==
Poskim must be learned in a large area of law. They must have shown the ability to apply complex legal rulings to a variety of novel situations. This considerable amount of material takes years of dedicated study to master.

Poskim play an integral role in Orthodox Judaism.

- Generally, in each generation there may be a handful of poskim who are considered a Posek HaDor ("posek of the present generation"). Their views have enormous impact across the world of Jewry. An example of an Ashkenazi Posek HaDor would be Rabbi Moshe Feinstein while a Sephardic example would be Rabbi Ovadia Yosef.
- Many rely on the rav in their community (in Hasidic communities, sometimes the rebbe) for legal rulings. But the rav may defer to a posek or the leading posek in the country or world for a complex issue.

Poskim will generally not overrule a specific law unless based on an earlier authority: a posek will generally extend a law to new situations but will not change the halakhah.

== Conservative Judaism ==
Conservative Judaism approaches the idea of posek, and Halakha in general, somewhat differently: poskim here apply a relatively lower weighting to precedent, and will thus frequently reinterpret (or even change) a previous ruling through a formal argument. Although there are some Conservative poskim (e.g., Louis Ginzberg, David Golinkin, Joel Roth, and Elliot Dorff), the rulings of any one individual rabbi are considered less authoritative than a consensus ruling. Thus, the Conservative movement's Rabbinical Assembly maintains a Committee on Jewish Law and Standards, whose decisions are accepted as authoritative within the American Conservative movement. At the same time, Conservative rabbis have the right of mara d'atra to interpret Jewish law for their own communities regardless of the responsa of the Law Committee.

== Progressive Judaism ==
Neither Reform nor Reconstructionist Judaism regards Halakha as binding.

Although Reform stresses the individual autonomy of its membership, it never completely abandoned the field of responsa literature, if only to counter its rivals' demands. Even Classical Reformers such as Rabbi David Einhorn composed some. Rabbi Solomon Freehof, and his successor Rabbi Walter Jacob, attempted to create a concept of "Progressive Halacha", authoring numerous responsa based on a methodology laying great emphasis on current sensibilities and ethical ideals. Full text collections of Reform responsa are available on the website of the Central Conference of American Rabbis.

The Reconstructionist position is that if Jews had formed cohesive communities again, their rulings would be binding, but presently Judaism is in a "post-Halakhic state". Therefore, their basic policy is to allow tradition "a vote, not a veto" in communal and personal affairs.

== List of poskim and major works ==
In chronological order, by the year of birth, and if needed, secondarily, by year of death and surname.

=== Poskim of past years ===
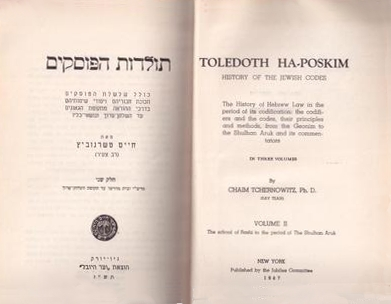
Toledot HaPoskim, History of the Jewish Codes, by Chaim Tchernowitz

==== 1600–1900 ====
- Yoel Sirkis (1561–1640), Bach
- David HaLevi Segal (1586–1667), Turei Zahav
- Sabbatai ha-Kohen (1621–1662), Shach
- Avraham Gombiner (1633–1683), Magen Avraham
- Tzvi Ashkenazi (1668–1718), Chacham Tzvi
- Jacob Emden (1797–1776)
- Yechezkel Landau (1713–1793), Noda Bihudah
- Vilna Gaon (1720–1797), Gra
- Shneur Zalman of Liadi (1745–1812), Shulchan Aruch HaRav
- Aryeh Leib Heller (1745–1812), Ketzos HaChoshen
- Avraham Danzig (1748–1820), Chayei Adam
- Yaakov Lorberbaum (1762–1830), Nesivos HaMishpat
- Moses Sofer (1762–1839), Chasam Sofer
- Menachem Mendel Schneersohn (1789–1866), Tzemach Tzedek
- Shlomo Ganzfried (1804–1886), Kitzur Shulchan Aruch
- Yitzchak Elchanan Spektor (1817–1896)
- Yehoshua Leib Diskin (1818–1898), Maharil Diskin

==== Orthodox ====
- Yechiel Michel Epstein (1829–1907), Aruch HaShulchan
- Yoseph Chaim of Bagdad (1832–1909), Ben Ish Chai, Rav Pealim
- Yisrael Meir Kagan (1838–1933), Mishnah Berurah, Chafetz Chaim
- Moshe Greenwald (1853–1910), Arugath HaBosem
- Chaim Ozer Grodzinski (1863–1940), Achiezer
- Abraham Isaac Kook (1865–1935)
- Eliezer David Greenwald (1867–1928), Keren L'Dovid
- Yaakov Chaim Sofer (1870–1939), Kaf HaChaim
- Avraham Duber Kahana Shapiro (1870–1943)
- Yonasan Steif, (1877–1958)
- Avraham Yeshayahu Karelitz (1878–1953), Chazon Ish
- Yechiel Yaakov Weinberg (1878–1966), Seridei Eish
- Yosef Eliyahu Henkin (1881–1973)
- Eliezer Silver (1882–1968)
- Yehezkel Abramsky (1886–1976)
- Yoel Teitelbaum (1887–1979), Vayoel Moshe, Divrei Yoel
- Avraham Chaim Naeh (1890–1954) Ketzos HaShulchan, Shiurei Mikveh, Shiurei Torah
- Zvi Yehuda Kook (1891–1982)
- Yaakov Kamenetsky (1891–1986)
- Aharon Kotler (1892–1962)
- Moshe Feinstein (1895–1986), Igrot Moshe
- Yitzchok Yaakov Weiss (1902–1989), Minchas Yitzchak
- Yosef Greenwald (1903–1984), Vayaan Yosef
- Joseph B. Soloveitchik (1903–1993)
- Yitzchok Hutner (1906–1980)
- Chanoch Dov Padwa (1908–2000), Cheishev Ho'Ephod
- Shlomo Zalman Auerbach (1910–1995), Minchat Shlomo
- Yosef Shalom Eliashiv (1910–2012)
- Chaim Pinchas Scheinberg (1910–2012)
- Pinhas Hirschprung (1912–1998)
- Shmuel Wosner (1913–2015), Shevet HaLevi
- Aharon Leib Shteinman (1913–2017)
- Ephraim Oshry (1914–2003)
- Avraham Shapira (1914–2007)
- Eliezer Waldenberg (1917–2006), Tzitz Eliezer
- Shlomo Goren (1918–1994)
- Chaim Kreiswirth (1918–2001)
- Yaakov Yitzhak Neumann (1920–2007), Ogiro Be'Oholcho
- Ovadia Yosef (1920–2013), Yabbia Omer
- Baruch Ben Haim (1921–2005)
- Fishel Hershkowitz (1922–2017), Klausenburger dayan in Williamsburg, Brooklyn, New York
- Hayim David HaLevi (1924–1998), Chief Rabbi of Tel Aviv, author of the set of halakha Mekor Hayim
- Menashe Klein (1924–2011), Ungvarer Rav; Mishneh Halachos
- Gedalia Dov Schwartz (1925–2020), av beit din of Beth Din of America and the Chicago Rabbinical Council
- Nissim Karelitz (1926–2019)
- Nahum Rabinovitch (1928–2020), rosh yeshiva of Yeshivat Birkat Moshe
- Chaim Kanievsky (1928–2022)
- Mordechai Eliyahu (1929–2010)
- Dovid Feinstein (1929–2020)
- Ephraim Greenblatt (1932–2014), Rivivos Efraim
- Zalman Nechemia Goldberg (1932–2020), av beit din, rosh yeshiva of Machon Lev, editor-in-chief of the Encyclopedia Talmudit
- Aharon Lichtenstein (1933–2015), rosh yeshiva of Yeshivat Har Etzion
- Meir Brandsdorfer (1934–2009), Kaneh Bosem
- Yechezkel Roth (1936–2021) Karlsburger Rav, author of Emek HaTeshuvah
- Shimon Eider (1938–2007)
- Yisroel Belsky (1938–2016)
- Yehuda Henkin (1945–2020)
- Haim Drukman (1932–2022)
- Yitzchak Abadi (1933–2025)

==== Conservative and Reform ====
- Jacob Zallel Lauterbach (1873–1942)
- Louis Ginzberg (1873–1953), The Responsa of Professor Louis Ginzberg
- Solomon Freehof (1892–1990), Reform Jewish Practice and its Rabbinic Background
- Isaac Klein (1905–1979), A Guide to Jewish Religious Practice
- Jacob Agus (1911–1986), Dialogue and Tradition

=== Living poskim ===
- Shmuel Kamenetsky (1924– ), rosh yeshiva, Talmudical Yeshiva of Philadelphia
- Dov Lior (1933– )
- Avigdor Nebenzahl (1935– )
- Yaakov Ariel (1937– )
- Zephaniah Drori (1937– )
- Zalman Baruch Melamed (1937– )
- Yisrael Ariel (1939– )
- Eliyahu Ben Haim (1940– )
- Ephraim Padwa (1940-) rabbi of Union of Orthodox Hebrew Congregations
- Hershel Schachter (1941– ), rosh yeshiva at RIETS
- Shlomo Aviner (1943– )
- Mordechai Willig (1947– ), rosh yeshiva at RIETS
- Yitzhak Yosef (1952– ), Chief Sephardic Rabbi of the State of Israel, author of the set Yalkut Yosef
- Yitzchak Berkovits (1953– ), rosh kollel The Jerusalem Kollel
- Osher Weiss (1953– ), Minchas Osher
- Yitzchak Breitowitz (1954– ), Rav, Kehilas Ohr Somayach, Jerusalem
- Eliezer Melamed (1961– )
- Simcha Bunim Cohen (1957– ), prolific author and pulpit rabbi in Lakewood, New Jersey
- Yisroel Dovid Harfenes author of Yisroel Vehazmanim, Mekadesh Yisroel and Nishmas Shabos
- Pinchas Toledano, hakham of the Spanish and Portuguese Jews of the Netherlands
- Shraga Feivel Zimmerman, av beis din of Kehillas Federation, London
- Gavriel Zinner author of the Nitei Gavriel series on halakha

== See also ==
- Dayan (rabbinic judge)
- Gemara
- History of responsa in Judaism
- Rabbinic authority
- Semikhah § Concept
