= Pupa Rebbe =

Pupa Rebbe may refer to one of the following two Pupa Rebbes:

- Rabbi Yosef Greenwald - previous Rebbe of the Pupa Hasidic dynasty
- Rabbi Yaakov Yechezkia Greenwald II - present Pupa Rebbe
