= Abba (disambiguation) =

ABBA was a Swedish pop music group.

Abba or ABBA may also refer to:

== Arts, entertainment, and media ==
=== Media related to the band Abba ===
- ABBA (album), a self-titled album by the Swedish pop music group ABBA
- ABBA: The Movie, a feature-length film about the pop group ABBA's 1977 Australian tour

=== Other arts, entertainment, and media ===
- "Abba" (song), a 1967 single by The Paragons
- ABBA, in poetry, a rhyme scheme also known as enclosed rhyme
- ABBA ABBA, a short novel by Anthony Burgess
- Jahangir Khan "Abba Ji", antagonist of the 2003 Indian film Maqbool, based on King Duncan from Macbeth

== Personal names and honorifics ==
- Ab (Semitic), also aba or abba, word for father in Aramaic
- Abba (surname)
- Abba (given name), and honorific

== Places ==
- Abba, Anambra State, a place in Anambra State, Nigeria
- Abba, Central African Republic, a place in Nana-Mambéré, Central African Republic
- Abba, Imo, a place in Imo State, Nigeria
- Abba, Georgia, a community in the US
- Abba River, a river in Western Australia
- Abba River, Western Australia, a locality in Western Australia's South West region

== Other uses ==
- A-B-B-A, a term used for a diesel electric locomotive lashup consisting of two cabless B units sandwiched between two cab A units
- ABBA, a sequence of penalty kick takers in a penalty shoot-out (association football)
- Abba Seafood, a Swedish seafood products company
- ABBA (political party), a right-wing Maltese political party
- ABBA SK, a Turkish sports club
- Abba transversa, a species of spider
- Academia Brasileira de Belas Artes (Brazilian Academy of Fine Arts), abbreviated as ABBA
- Italian destroyer Giuseppe Cesare Abba, an Italian destroyer, later reclassified as a torpedo boat and as a minesweeper

== See also ==
- ABA (disambiguation)
- Aba (disambiguation)
- Abas (disambiguation)
- Abbas (disambiguation)
- Abu (disambiguation)
- Abbai (disambiguation)
- Av (month), the eleventh month of the civil year and the fifth month of the ecclesiastical year on the Hebrew calendar
