= Abas =

Abas or ABAS may refer to:

== People ==
- Abas (sophist), an ancient Greek sophist and rhetorician
- Abas, the ancient writer of a work entitled Troia from which Maurus Servius Honoratus (ad Aen. ix. 264) has preserved a fragment
- Abas I of Armenia, king of Armenia from 928 to 953
- Abas (name)

== Other uses ==
- Abas River, a river of the Caucasus
  - Battle of the Abas, a battle at the river in 65 BCE
- Abas Business Software, an enterprise resource planning and e-business application from ABAS Software AG
- Abas unipunctata, a species of planthopper and the only member of the animal genus Abas
- Abas wittii, an extinct species of diatoms
- Abas (diatom), an extinct genus of algae
- Abas (mythology), several individuals in Greek and Roman mythology

== See also ==
- ABA (disambiguation)
- Aba (disambiguation)
- Abba (disambiguation)
- Ab (Semitic)
