= Yaakov Yechezkiya Greenwald =

Hungarian Jewish religious leader

Rabbi Ya'akov Yechezkiya Greenwald
- יעקב יחזקי' גרינוואלד
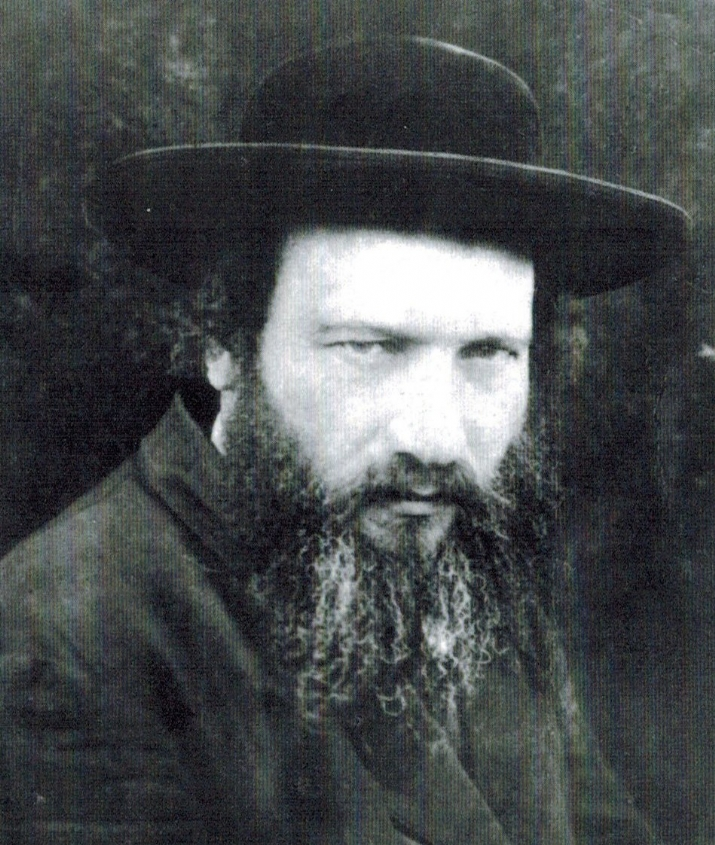

Personal life
- Born: 1882 Csorna, Hungary
- Died: c. 1 March 1941 (2 Adar 5701) Pápa, Hungary
- Spouse: Sara Rivkah Brown
- Children: Yosef Greenwald, Levi Yitzchak Greenwald
- Occupation: Rabbi, Rosh Yeshiva

Religious life
- Religion: Judaism
- Denomination: Orthodox

Senior posting
- Students: Yaakov Yitzchak Neumann, Shlomo Lorincz

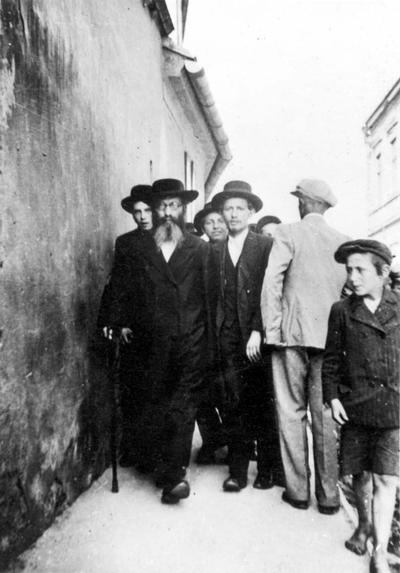
Greenwald of Pupa with students

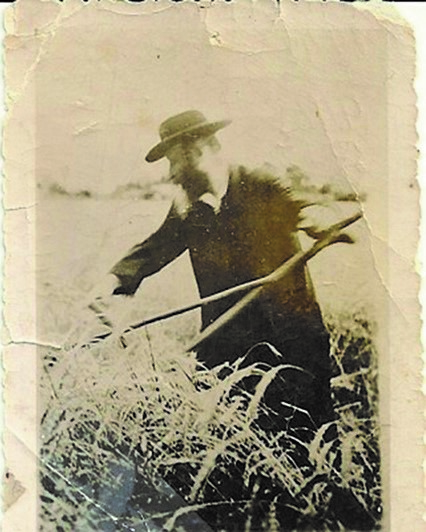
Greenwald cutting wheat for matzos

Ya'akov Yechezkiya Greenwald (Hebrew: יעקב יחזקי' גרינוואלד. Legal name: Jakab Grünwald. Also called the "Vayaged Ya'akov", 1882 – c. 1 March 1941 (2 Adar 5701)) was the rabbi of the Etz Chaim community in Pápa, Hungary, and the rosh yeshiva there. He was the predecessor of the Pupa Hasidic dynasty.

== Early life ==
Greenwald was born in Csorna to Moshe Grunwald, rabbi and rosh yeshiva of Khust, and studied under his father until his marriage in 1900 to his cousin Sara Rivkah Brown.

== Career ==
In 1906 Greenwald was appointed rabbi of Likov. In 1912 he was appointed rabbi of Deutschkreutz, replacing his uncle Eliezer David Greenwald. In 1924 he became rabbi of Hunyad and headed a yeshiva in the city.

In 1929, he became rabbi of Pápa, Hungary. He established a yeshiva there which soon numbered 300 students, and became one of the largest and most important Hungarian yeshivas.

Greenwald was a Belz hasid and sent many of his disciples to Belz.

== Death and succession ==
Greenwald died in 1941 and was buried in the Jewish cemetery in Pápa, where he was succeeded by his son, Yosef Greenwald, as Rabbi of the Etz Chaim community in Pápa and as rosh yeshiva.

His successors as rebbe include his son Yosef Greenwald and Yosef's son Ya'akov Yehezkiya Greenwald II.

== Students ==
- Yaakov Yitzchak Neumann, rabbi of the Belz community in Montreal
- Shlomo Lorincz, member of the Knesset on behalf of Agudat Yisrael
