= Xanthicus =

Xanthicus is the name of the sixth month of the Macedonian calendar of the Seleucid Syrians. It corresponds with Nisan in the Jewish calendar or April in the Gregorian calendar.
