= Shimshon Katz =

Pupa Rosh yeshiva in Kiryas Pupa, located in Ossining, New York

Rav Shimshon Katz is the Rosh yeshiva of the Pupa Yeshiva in Kiryas Pupa, located in Ossining, New York.

== Biography ==
Rabbi Katz is the son of Rabbi Shmuel Abba (Tzimering) Katz, Bivelarre Rav (d. 19 January 1986 - 9 Shevat 5746) who had his shul on Hicksville Rd. in Far Rockway where he served as a Ruv for over 20 years where people were very machshiv him & came for Brochois. He is buried in the Village of New Square Cemetery. Rabbi Shimshon is the brother of Rabbi Elya Katz (Menahel Bais Hamedrash of Yeshivah Torah Vodaas), Reb Yisroel Yaakov Katz (of Boro Park) and Rabbi Chaim Mordechai Katz (a Torah lecturer and speaker in Flatbush). His two brother-in-law are Rabbi Yehoshua Heshil Bick (son of Rabbi Moshe Bick Z”L) and Reb Boruch Iskowitz of Boro Park.
