= Aba =

Aba may refer to:

== Animals ==
- Aba roundleaf bat
- Gymnarchus (or aba), an electric fish

== People ==
=== Clans ===
- Aba (genus), a noble kindred in Hungary
- Aba people, in Russia
- Hape people, in North America

=== In arts and entertainment ===
- Aba Bayefsky, Canadian artist and teacher
- Aba Cercato, Italian television presenter
- Vilmos Aba-Novák, a Hungarian painter

=== Rulers ===
- Aba, ruler of Olba
- Samuel Aba, 11th-century Hungarian king

=== Other people ===
- Aba I, patriarch of the Church of the East from 540 to 552
- Aba II, patriarch of the Church of the East from 741 to 751
- Aba Andam, Ghanaian physicist
- Johnny Aba (born 1956), a Papua New Guinean boxer

== Places ==
=== Africa ===
- Aba, Nigeria
  - Aba River (Nigeria)
- Aba Island, on Sudan's White Nile river
- Aba, Democratic Republic of the Congo

=== Asia ===
- Aba (Russia), a river
- Aba, Okayama, Japan
- Aba Prefecture, Sichuan, China
  - Aba County
    - Aba, Sichuan
- Upu (also transliterated Aba), a historic region around Damascus

=== Europe ===
- Aba, Hungary

== Religion and mythology ==
- Aba (mythology), Hellenic Thracian naiad nymph
- Anglican Province of Aba, Nigeria
- Roman Catholic Diocese of Aba, Nigeria
- Aba, the Great Spirit of Choctaw mythology

== Other uses ==
- Aba (Dune), a robe in the fictional Dune universe
- Aba (film), a 2008 Sri Lanka film
- Aba Women's War, period of unrest in colonial Nigeria
- A short form of Abaya, a middle eastern robe
- Alternative name for Bisht, a men's cloak worn in Arab countries
- Applied behavioral analysis
- MV Aba (1918), an early passenger motor vessel and World War II hospital ship, in service 1921-47

== See also ==
- Abaá, a Fang longhouse
- Abba (disambiguation)
- Abas (disambiguation)
- Ab (Semitic), "father" in Semitic languages
- ABA (disambiguation)
