= Geviha ben Pesisa =

Geviha ben Pesisa (Hebrew: גביהא בן פסיסא) is a legendary character from Jewish folklore, depicted as a hunchback priest who defended the People of Israel against land claims presented to Alexander the Great.

== Overview ==
=== Disputation with the Canaanites ===
A group of African Canaanites (possibly Carthaginians) brought a claim before Alexander the Great that the land of Canaan belonged to them, citing Numbers 34:2 “This is the land that shall fall to you as an inheritance, the land of Canaan according to its borders”. Geviha ben Pesisa offered to serve as advocate for the Jews, and the Sages permitted him to do so. Ben Pesisa also cited the Torah to counter their argument, stating: “And he said: Cursed will be Canaan; a slave of slaves shall he be to his brethren” (Genesis 9:25). The Africans asked Alexander for three days to come up with a response to Geviha ben Pesisa, but they were unable to provide one and subsequently fled their fields and vineyards.

=== Disputation with the Egyptians ===
Another lawsuit in which Geviha ben Pesisa represented the Jewish people was by the people of Egypt, who claimed that they were owed the gold and silver "borrowed" by the Israelites during the Exodus from Egypt. Geviha ben Pesisa argued that the gold and silver were wages owed the Israelites for their hard labor during 430 years of enslavement by Egypt. Like the Canaanites, they asked Alexander the Great, the presiding judge, for three days to respond, but they were likewise unable to come up with a counterargument.

=== Disputation with the Ishmaelites ===
On another occasion, a group of Ishmaelites claimed that since the land of Canaan was promised to Abraham, it should be divided equally among Abraham's descendants. Geviha ben Pesisa responded "And Abraham gave all that he had to Isaac. But to the sons of the concubines that Abraham had, Abraham gave gifts, and he sent them away from his son, while he yet lived, eastward, to the east country”. He argued that since Abraham himself had designated the land as belonging solely to Isaac, the children of Ishmael had no claim to it. As for the gifts which Abraham provided to his sons by Hagar and Keturah, Rabbi Yirmeya bar Abba claimed that Abraham gave them the secrets of witchcraft.
