= Av (month) =

5th month of the Hebrew calendar

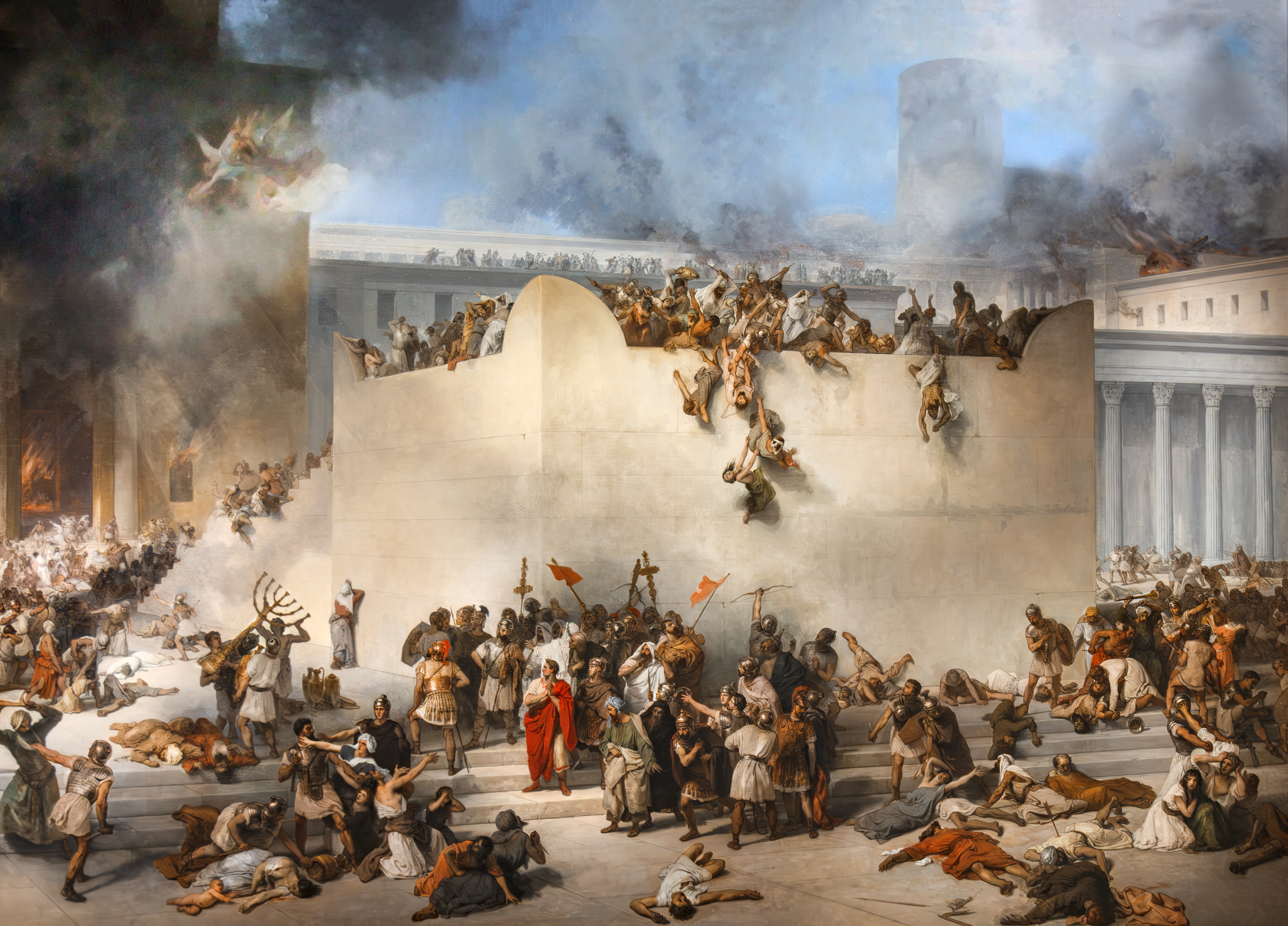
- Francesco Hayez, The Destruction of the Temple of Jerusalem, 1867. The 9th of Av, Tisha B'Av, is a fast commemorating what has been called the saddest day in Jewish history, which is when the Holy Temple was set aflame.
- Native name: אָב (Hebrew)
- Calendar: Hebrew calendar
- Month number: 5
- Number of days: 30
- Season: Summer (Northern Hemisphere)
- Gregorian equivalent: July–August
- Significant days: Tisha B'Av; Tu B'Av

Av (also Menachem Av, Hebrew: אָב, Modern: ʾAv, Tiberian: ʾĀḇ) is the eleventh month of the civil year and the fifth month of the ecclesiastical year on the Hebrew calendar. It is a month of 30 days, and usually occurs in July–August on the Gregorian calendar.

The Babylonian Talmud states that "when we enter [the month of] Av, our joy is diminished". This is because the darkest events in Jewish history occurred during the first week and a half of this month, particularly the Nine Days which culminate in Tisha B'Av, the 9th day of Av. However, the month also contains a holiday called Tu B'Av which was, in ancient times, considered one of the happiest days of the year.

== Etymology ==
Originally Abu on the Babylonian calendar, the name is derived from Akkadian ʾAbū, which might mean "reed" or be connected to the name of the Mesopotamian god Abu. Others derive the name of the month from the Hebrew word "Av" - "father". The name Ab (Arabic: آﺏ) also appears in the Arabic language for the month of August in the Levant (see Arabic names of calendar months).

The name Ab appears in Aramaic ostraca from the Persian period, in Aramaic documents from Ancient Egypt and Palmyra, in Masada and Qarnayim ostraca, in the best manuscripts of Targum Jonathan to Ez. 20:1, and in Rabbinic literature starting with Megillat Taanit. It is one of several months which are not named in the Hebrew Bible.

=== Menachem Av ===
The nickname Menachem Av, used particularly by Ashkenazim in the Birkat HaChodesh, has no clear origin. It is variously interpreted to mean Comforter of the Alphabet, Comforter of the Father, and Comforting Father.

== Holidays ==
- Av 9 – Tisha B'Av
- Av 15 – Tu B'Av

== In Jewish history ==
- 1 Av (circa 1273 BCE) - Death of high priest Aaron
- 1 Av (513 BCE) - Ezra and his followers arrive in Israel
- 5 Av (1572 CE) - Hillula of the Arizal
- 7 Av (586 BCE) - First Temple invaded by King Nebuchadnezzar
- 7 Av (67 CE) - Civil war breaks out in besieged Jerusalem; one group set fire to the city's food stores, which is said to have quickened starvation.
- 7 Av (1492 CE) - Jews of Spain expelled by King Ferdinand and Queen Isabella.
- 7 Av (1853) - Death of Rabbi Moshe Greenwald, Rav of Khust and author of Arugath Habosem
- 9 Av (586 BCE and 70 CE) - Holy Temples destroyed by the Babylonians and Romans respectively.
- 9 Av (133 CE) - Fall of Betar to the Romans, ending Bar Kochba's rebellion.
- 9 Av (1290 CE) - Jews are expelled from England by King Edward I and not permitted to legally return for 350 years.
- 10 Av (70 CE) - The Holy Temple, set on fire the previous day, finishes burning.
- 12 Av (1263) - Disputation of Barcelona between Nachmanides and Pablo Christiani.
- 13 Av (1984) - Death of Rabbi Yosef Greenwald, Rebbe of Pupa and author of Vaychi Yosef
- 15 Av (148 CE) - Betar dead buried, 15 years after the fall of the fortress.
- 15 Av - The Day of the Breaking of the Ax – when the Holy Temple existed, the cutting of firewood for the altar was completed on this date every year. The event was celebrated by feasting, rejoicing, and the ceremonial breaking of the axes.
- 17 Av (1929) - 67 Jews are killed in the Hebron Massacre.
- 24 Av (circa 100 BCE) - A Hasmonean holiday commemorates the reinstatement of Jewish civil law in place of Hellenist secular law on this day.

== See also ==
- Jewish astrology
