= ABA =

ABA may refer to:

== Arts and media ==
- Altbachisches Archiv, collection of 17th-century music, most written by the Bach family
- A-B-A, the ternary form in music
- A.B.A, a character in the fighting game series Guilty Gear

== Businesses and organizations ==
=== Broadcasting ===
- Alabama Broadcasters Association, US
- Asahi Broadcasting Aomori, a television station in Aomori Prefecture, Japan
- Australian Broadcasting Authority

=== Education ===
- Académie des Beaux-Arts (Kinshasa), Democratic Republic of the Congo
- American British Academy, Oman

=== Sports ===
==== Basketball ====
- ABA League, Adriatic first-tier basketball league
  - ABA League Second Division, Adriatic second-tier basketball league
- American Basketball Association, defunct professional league (1967–1976)
- American Basketball Association (2000–present), semi-professional league
- Australian Basketball Association, defunct semi-professional entity

==== Other sports ====
- Amateur Boxing Association of England, former name of England Boxing
- American Bandy Association
- American Bicycle Association
- American Bridge Association

=== Trade and professional bodies ===
- American Bankers Association
- American Bandmasters Association
- American Bar Association, an association of lawyers
- American Beverage Association, beverage industry lobby organization
- American Booksellers Association
- American Bus Association
- American Burn Association
- Antiquarian Booksellers Association, a trade body in the British Isles
- Association of Black Anthropologists
- Australian Banking Association
- Australian Booksellers Association
- American Bantam Association

=== Other businesses and organizations ===
- ABA Chemicals, a Chinese chemical manufacturing company
- ABA Games, a Japanese creator of freeware games
- AB Aerotransport, former Scandinavian airline
- Alabama Baptist Association, US
- American Baptist Association, a Baptist denomination predominant in the American South
- American Bell Association International
- American Birding Association
- Australian Blue Asbestos, mining, bagging and blue asbestos distribution company
- Australian Breastfeeding Association

== Finance ==
- ABA routing transit number, a bank code used in the US
- Accredited Business Accountant, American accountancy credential

== Transport infrastructure ==
- Abakan International Airport in Republic of Khakassia, Russia (IATA airport code ABA)
- Aberdare railway station, Wales, UK (National Rail code "ABA")

== Other uses ==
- ABA problem, a multithreading computing anomaly
- Abé language of Ivory Coast
- Abscisic acid, a plant hormone
- Applied behavior analysis, a type of behavioral therapy most commonly used with children with autism
- Architectural Barriers Act of 1968, act of the US Congress

== See also ==
- Abas (disambiguation)
- Abba (disambiguation)
- Aba (disambiguation)
