= Lajos Bruck =

Hungarian painter

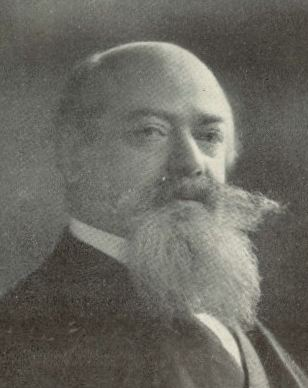
- Born: Lajos Bruck; 1846; Pápa
- Died: 1910 (aged 63–64); Budapest

Lajos Bruck (Pápa, November 3, 1846 – Budapest, December 3, 1910) was a Hungarian painter. During his lifetime, his works were featured in Műcsarnok (Art Gallery). He is displayed in the Hungarian National Gallery.

== Biography ==
He was born as the son of Mór Bruck and Jozefa Bonyhárd. There were eleven brothers. He completed his lower schooling in the capital. His father intended him to pursue a commercial career, but he went to the Vienna Academy of Fine Arts to study painting. Here he managed to get enough commissions to overcome his financial difficulties, with a state scholarship he received based on his pictures sent home, he enrolled in the Academy of Fine Arts in Venice (Accademia di Belle Arti) in 1869, where he became a student of Pompeo Molmenti.

In 1874, after a short study trip to Rome and Naples, he continued his art studies in Paris under the guidance of Mihály Munkácsy. He soon became a widely known painter in Paris and – thanks to his pictures sent to domestic exhibitions – in Hungary as well.

In 1880, he went on a study trip to the Alföld, and in 1883 to Kalotaszeg. In 1885, he moved to London, where he received many orders from the royal house, among others.

In 1886, he was elected president of the association of Hungarians in London. In this capacity, he managed to prevent the merger of the association into the association of Austrians in London.

He returned home in 1895 and lived and worked in Budapest from then until his death. He actively participated in the artistic life of the capital. In 1894, he was a founding member of the National Salon. In 1895, he was admitted to the Masonic Lodge of Democracy.

In 1899, the Hungarian government commissioned him to organize an exhibition in St. Petersburg, at the opening of which II. Tsar Miklós awarded him the Order of St. Anne.

He was laid to rest in the Jewish cemetery on Salgótarjáni street.
