= Tu B'Av =

Jewish holiday

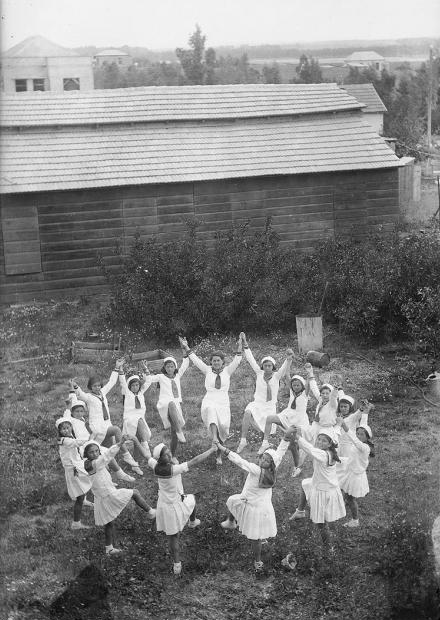
- Dancing girls on Tu B'Av
- Official name: Hebrew: ט״ו באב; English: Fifteenth of Av
- Type: Jewish
- Observances: Tachanun and similar prayers are omitted from daily prayers
- Date: 15th day of Av
- 2025 date: Sunset, 8 August – nightfall, 9 August
- 2026 date: Sunset, 28 July – nightfall, 29 July
- 2027 date: Sunset, 17 August – nightfall, 18 August
- 2028 date: Sunset, 6 August – nightfall, 7 August
- Frequency: Annual

Tu B'Av (Hebrew: ט״ו באב, lit. 'fifteenth of Av') is a minor Jewish holiday. In modern-day Israel, it is celebrated as a holiday of love (חג האהבה Ḥag HaAhava), akin to Valentine's Day, and is thus a popular day for weddings.

== Etymology ==
Called Tu B'Av because of the sound of the two Hebrew letters whose combined numerical value corresponds to that of the date (15). The value 15 is obtained by combining the values of the letter Tet (9) and Vav (6), which, together, can be read as "tu," hence the name of the festival, Tu b'Av. The number 15 can also be obtained by combining the letters Yud (10) and Hey (5), but such combination would coincide with the first two letters of the Tetragrammaton, and thus are supplanted by the letters Tet and Vav to avoid using a name for the divine. Av is the name of the month in the Jewish calendar.

== Historical significance ==
According to the Mishna, Tu B'Av was a joyous holiday in the days of the Temple in Jerusalem, marking the beginning of the grape harvest. On Yom Kippur and Tu B'Av, the unmarried girls of Jerusalem dressed in white garments and went out to dance in the vineyards. (Note: However, scholar Eitam Henkin hypothesized that the meeting on vineyards only took place on Tu B'Av, while the wearing of white clothing only took place on Yom Kippur, in contrast to the general presumption that both practices were done on both holidays.) The Talmud states that there were no holy days as happy for the Jews as Tu B'Av and Yom Kippur.

Various reasons for celebrating on Tu B'Av are cited by the Talmud and Talmudic commentators:

- While the Israelites wandered in the desert for forty years, female orphans without brothers could only marry within their tribe to prevent their father's inherited territory in the Land of Israel from passing on to other tribes, following the incident of the Daughters of Zelophehad. After the conquest and division of Canaan under Joshua, this ban was lifted on the fifteenth of Av and inter-tribal marriage was allowed.
- At the end of Israel's wandering in the wilderness, the last remnant of the generation of the sin of the spies, which had been forbidden from entering the Promised Land, found that they were not destined to die. For forty years, every Tisha B'av the Israelites made graves for themselves in which they slept expecting to be their last night; every year a proportion of them died. In the 40th year, the fifteen thousand who had remained from the first generation went to sleep in the graves and woke up the next day to their surprise. Thinking they made a mistake with the date, they kept sleeping in graves until they reached Tu B'Av and saw a full moon. Only then did they know they were going to enter the Land of Israel with the new generation.
- The Tribe of Benjamin was allowed to intermarry with the other tribes after the incident of the Concubine of Gibeah (see Judges 19–21).
- Cutting of the wood for the main altar in the Temple was completed for the year. The holiday celebrated the wood-offering brought in the Temple (see Nehemiah 13:31). Josephus refers to it as the Feast of Xylophory ("Wood-bearing").
- King Hoshea of the northern kingdom removed the sentries on the road leading to Jerusalem, allowing the ten tribes to once again have access to the Temple.
- The nights, traditionally the ideal time for Torah study, are lengthened again after the summer solstice, permitting more study.
- The Roman occupiers permitted burial of the victims of the massacre at Bethar during the Bar Kochba rebellion. Miraculously, the bodies had not decomposed, despite exposure to the elements for over a year.

== Modern times ==
Tu B'Av is a day of joy that follows Tisha B'Av by six days and contrasts with the sadness of Tisha B'Av. Tu B'Av does not have many established religious rituals associated with its celebration except that Tachanun is not recited, either at mincha the day before or on the day itself, and a bride and groom traditionally do not fast if their wedding falls on Tu B'Av. These customs commemorate the joyous events that occurred in the history of the Jewish people.

In modern times, it has become a romantic Jewish holiday among secular Jews who mostly view it as the Jewish equivalent of Valentine's Day. After experiencing a surge in popularity in the modern state of Israel, Israelis prefer to celebrate love on Tu B'Av and North American Jewish organizations throw celebrations and offer teachings on Tu B'Av. It serves as a day for matchmaking, weddings, and proposing, but also for increasing Torah study. Tu B'Av is more popular than Valentine's Day in Israel since secular Jews and Haredi celebrate Tu B'Av while Haredi are less likely to be aware of Valentine's Day.
