= Abas (name) =

Abas is both a given name and a surname. Notable people with this name include:

- Abas (sophist), an ancient Greek sophist and rhetorician
- Abas, the ancient writer of a work entitled Troia from which Maurus Servius Honoratus (ad Aen. ix. 264) has preserved a fragment
- Abas I of Armenia (?–953), king of Armenia from 928 to 953
- Abas Arslanagić (born 1944), Bosnian handball player
- Abas Basir (born 1968), Afghan academic and politician
- Abas Ermenji (1913–2003), Albanian politician and historian
- Abas Ismaili (born 1967), Iranian cyclist
- Elisha Abas (born 1971), Israeli pianist
- Salleh Abas (1929–2021), Malaysian chief justice
- Stephen Abas (born 1978), American wrestler
