= Abba (surname) =

Abba is a surname of various origins. Most commonly, it is an Italian surname. It also existed in Semitic languages, relating to Abraham or with its literal meaning of "father", and in English, as an occupational surname taken by people employed in abbeys.

Notable people with the surname include:

- Bérangère Abba (born 1976), French politician
- Cele Abba (1906–1992), Italian stage and film actress
- Dimi Mint Abba (1958–2011), Mauritanian musician
- Giuseppe Cesare Abba (1838–1910), Italian patriot and writer
- Marta Abba (1900–1988), Italian stage actress

== See also ==
- Raba Bar Jeremiah, also called "Abba", Jewish Talmudist
