= Nisan =

1st month of the Hebrew calendar

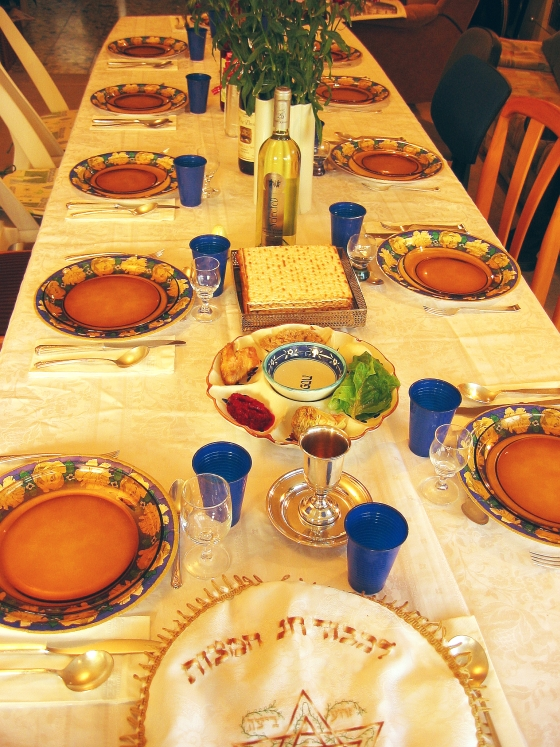
- The Seder Table the ritual feast in the Jewish holiday of Passover which occurs on the 15 Nisan.
- Native name: נִיסָן (Hebrew), ܢܝܣܢ (Syriac)
- Calendars: Hebrew calendar, Assyrian calendar
- Month number: 1
- Number of days: 30
- Season: Spring (Northern Hemisphere)
- Gregorian equivalent: March–April
- Significant days: Passover, Akitu (Assyrian New year)

Nisan (/ˈniːsɑːn/; Hebrew: נִיסָן [niˈsan]) or Nissan (/ˈnɪsɑːn/; from Akkadian: 𒁈 Nissāni) is the month of the barley ripening and the first month of spring in the Babylonian and Hebrew calendars. The name of the month is an Akkadian borrowing, although it is ultimately derived from Sumerian nisag 'first fruits'.

In the Hebrew calendar, it is the first month of the ecclesiastical year, called the "first of the months of the year" (Exodus 12:1-2), "first month" (Ex 12:14), and the month of Aviv (Ex 13:4; בְּחֹ֖דֶשׁ הָאָבִֽיב ḥōḏeš hāʾāḇîḇ). It is called Nissān in the Book of Esther. It is a month of 30 days. In the year 2025 CE, 1 Nisan occurred on 30 March. Counting from 1 Tishrei, the civil new year, it would be the seventh month (eighth, in leap year), but in contemporary Jewish culture, both months are viewed as the first and seventh simultaneously, and are referred to as one or the other depending on the specific religious aspects being discussed.

In Jewish tradition, Nisan is considered the "month of redemption", recalling the exodus from Egypt which occurred during this month. The Talmud states:

In Nisan our forefathers were redeemed from Egypt; and in Nisan in the future the Jewish people will be redeemed in the final redemption.

== Name and origin ==
The biblical Hebrew months were given enumerations instead of names. The new moon of Aviv, which in Hebrew means 'barley ripening' and by extension 'spring season' (Exodus 9:31) is one of the few called both by name and by its number, the first. Nisan and other Akkadian-origin names for the equivalent lunar months in the Babylonian calendar came to be applied to the Hebrew calendar during the Babylonian captivity, in which the month of Aviv's name was Araḫ Nissānu ('month of the beginning').

== Holidays and observances ==
- 1 Nisan Lunar new year, marking the month of Aviv meaning spring, as the first month of the year, which month was later called Nisan. The first national mitzvah that was given to the Jewish people to fix the calendar to the new moon of Aviv, according to the Book of Exodus 12:1–2, 12:18. (c. 1456 BCE)
- 10 Nisan – Yom HaAliyah – Aliyah Day, Israeli national holiday
- 14 Nisan – Fast of the Firstborn – When the 14th falls on Sabbath, Ashkenazim observe it on 12 Nisan and Sephardim do not observe it at all
- 14 Nisan – Passover seder meal and Haggadah on the going out of the 14th and eve of the 15th
- 15–21 Nisan (22 Nisan outside of Israel) – Feast of Matzot – Passover week
- 23 Nisan – Mimouna – a Maghrebi Jewish celebration of the end of the Passover prohibition on eating chametz, on 22 Nisan within Israel
- 27 Nisan – Yom HaShoah (Holocaust and Heroism Remembrance Day) – on 26 Nisan or 28 Nisan when the 27th falls on Friday or Sunday respectively, interfering with Shabbat

== Moveable holidays and observances ==
- Shabbat HaGadol is the sabbath which immediately precedes the 15 Nisan, the first day of Pesach, which changes due to the leap year in the Hebrew calendar.

== In history and tradition ==
- 1 Nisan The day the floodwaters receded from the earth, after the dove was sent out by Noah and returned with an olive branch, according to Genesis 8:10-13
- 1 Nisan (c. 1638 BCE) – Death of Abraham according to the Talmud
- 1 Nisan (c. 1533 BCE) – Death of Isaac according to the Talmud
- 1 Nisan (c. 1506 BCE) – Death of Jacob according to the Talmud
- 1 Nisan (c. 1455 BCE) – Tabernacle (Mishkan) inaugurated on the second year "Exodus 40".
- 1 Nisan (c. 1455 BCE) death of Nadab and Abihu
- 1 Nisan (c. 3761 BCE) – Creation of the Universe according to Joshua ben Hananiah's opinion in the Talmud, tractate Rosh Hashanah 10b–11a).
- 1 Nisan (1772) – Birth of Rabbi Nachman of Breslov
- 1 Nisan (1892) – Death of Rabbi Elimelech Szapira of Grodzhisk
- 2 Nisan (1920) – Death of Sholom Dovber Schneersohn, the fifth Lubavitcher Rebbe. Among his last words were, "I'm going to heaven; I leave you the writings."
- 3 Nisan (1492) – The Alhambra Decree orders the expulsion of Spanish Jews from Castile and Aragon (but not Navarre).
- 7 Nisan (c. 1416 BCE) – Joshua sends two spies to Jericho.
- 8 Nisan (1948) – Birth of Yaakov Yechezkiya Greenwald II, the present Pupa Rebbe
- 10 Nisan (c. 1456 BCE) – The first Shabbat HaGadol was celebrated by the Israelites in Egypt five days before The Exodus.
- 10 Nisan (c. 1417 BCE) – Yahrzeit of Miriam the prophetess, 39 years after the Exodus.
- 10 Nisan (c. 1416 BCE) – The Israelites cross the Jordan River into Canaan (Book of Joshua, 4)
- 11 Nisan (1270) – Death of Nachmanides
- 11 Nisan (1902) – Birth of the seventh Lubavitcher Rebbe, Menachem Mendel Schneerson
- 13 Nisan (c. 474 BCE) – Haman's decree to annihilate the Jews is passed.
- 13 Nisan (1575) – Death of Joseph Caro, author of the Shulchan Aruch.
- 13 Nisan (1866) – Death of Menachem Mendel Schneersohn, the third Lubavitcher Rebbe.
- 14 Nisan (1135) – Birth of Maimonides
- 14 Nisan (1943) – Warsaw Ghetto Uprising begins. The uprising would last until 3 Iyar, and is now commemorated in Israel on 27 Nisan.
- 14 Nisan (c. 1456 BCE) – On the going out thereof, the eve of the 15th, was the first Passover meal, and the tenth plague on Egypt, the slaying of the firstborn.
- 15 Nisan (c. 1456 BCE) – The Exodus from Egypt, with a strong hand and an outstretched arm
- 15 Nisan (c. 1713 BCE) – Birth of Isaac
- 15 Nisan (474 BCE) – Esther appears before Ahasuerus unsummoned and invites him and Haman to a feast to be held the same day. During the feast she requests that the king and Haman attend a second feast the next day.
- 16 Nisan (c. 1273 BCE) – The Israelites stop eating manna six days after entering the Holy Land.
- 16 Nisan (c. 474 BCE) – Esther's second feast, during which she accuses Haman regarding his plot to annihilate her nation. Ahasuerus orders his servants to hang Haman.
- 17 Nisan (c. 24th century BCE) – Noah's Ark came to rest on mountains of Ararat
- 17 Nisan (c. 474 BCE) – Haman hanged after Esther's second drinking party.
- 21 Nisan (c. 1456 BCE) – The Red Sea splits, allowing Israel to escape the Egyptian army.
- 26 Nisan (c. 1386 BCE) – Traditional yahrzeit of Joshua son of Nun.
- 27 Nisan (1951) - Israel formally establishes Yom HaShoah by Knesset resolution, institutionalizing Holocaust remembrance as a national day of mourning and reflection.
- 28 Nisan (c. 1415 BCE) – Battle of Jericho by Joshua (Book of Joshua ch. 6).
- 29 Nisan (1620) – Death of Hayyim ben Joseph Vital, a Kabbalist and a disciple of Isaac Luria.
- 29 Nisan (1699) – In Bamberg, Germany, during a commercial crisis in 1699, the populace rose up against the Jews, and one Jew saved himself by throwing prunes from a gable-window down upon the mob. That event, the 29th of Nisan, called the Zwetschgen Taanit "Plum-Fast", was commemorated by a fast and a Purim festivity until the extermination of the Jewish community there.

== Table of civil dates when 1 Nisan occurs ==
The list below gives a time which can be used to determine the day the Jewish ecclesiastical (spring) year starts over a period of nineteen years. These are not Nisan molad times, although the offset necessarily remains constant. (The fractions shown are fractions of a minute.)

17:49 Wednesday, 22 March 2023
15:21 $\tfrac{13}{18}$ Tuesday, 9 April 2024
00:10 $\tfrac{7}{18}$ Sunday, 30 March 2025
08:59 $\tfrac{1}{18}$ Thursday, 19 March 2026
06:31 $\tfrac{14}{18}$ Wednesday, 7 April 2027
15:20 $\tfrac{8}{18}$ Sunday, 26 March 2028
00:09 $\tfrac{2}{18}$ Friday, 16 March 2029
21:41 $\tfrac{15}{18}$ Wednesday, 3 April 2030
06:30 $\tfrac{9}{18}$ Monday, 24 March 2031
15:19 $\tfrac{3}{18}$ Friday, 12 March 2032
12:51 $\tfrac{16}{18}$ Thursday, 31 March 2033
21:40 $\tfrac{10}{18}$ Monday, 20 March 2034
19:13 $\tfrac{5}{18}$ Sunday, 8 April 2035
04:01 $\tfrac{17}{18}$ Friday, 28 March 2036
12:50 $\tfrac{11}{18}$ Tuesday, 17 March 2037
10:23 $\tfrac{6}{18}$ Monday, 5 April 2038
19:12 Friday, 25 March 2039
04:00 $\tfrac{12}{18}$ Wednesday, 14 March 2040
01:33 $\tfrac{7}{18}$ Tuesday, 2 April 2041

Every nineteen years this time is 2 days, 16 hours, 33 1/18 minutes later in the week. That is either the same or the previous day in the civil calendar, depending on whether the difference in the day of the week is three or two days. If 29 February is included fewer than five times in the nineteen – year period the date will be later by the number of days which corresponds to the difference between the actual number of insertions and five. If the year is due to start on Sunday, it actually begins on the following Tuesday if the following year is due to start on Friday morning. If due to start on Monday, Wednesday or Friday it actually begins on the following day. If due to start on Saturday, it actually begins on the following day if the previous year was due to begin on Monday morning.

The table below lists, for a Jewish year commencing on 23 March, the civil date of the first day of each month. If the year does not begin on 23 March, each month's first day will differ from the date shown by the number of days that the start of the year differs from 23 March. The correct column is the one which shows the correct starting date for the following year in the last row. If 29 February falls within a Jewish month the first day of later months will be a day earlier than shown.

Civil date of first day of Jewish months
Length of year:	353 days	354 days	355 days	383 days	384 days	385 days
First month	23 March					
Second month	22 April					
Third month	21 May					
Fourth month	20 June					
Fifth month	19 July					
Sixth month	18 August					
Seventh month	16 September					
Eighth month	16 October					
Ninth month	14 November		15 November	14 November		15 November
Tenth month	13 December	14 December	15 December	13 December	14 December	15 December
Eleventh month	11 January	12 January	13 January	11 January	12 January	13 January
Added month	—N/a			10 February	11 February	12 February
Twelfth month	10 February	11 February	12 February	12 March	13 March	14 March
First month	11 March	12 March	13 March	10 April	11 April	12 April

For long period calculations, dates should be reduced to the Julian calendar and converted back to the civil calendar at the end of the calculation. The civil calendar used here (Exigian) is correct to one day in 44,000 years and omits the leap day in centennial years which do not give remainder 200 or 700 when divided by 900. It is identical to the Gregorian calendar between 15 October 1582 CE and 28 February 2400 CE (both dates inclusive). (Note: This calendar was devised to provide specific advantages over the Revised Julian calendar, which was itself devised to provide specific advantages over the Gregorian calendar. These are: historical identity of dates with the Gregorian (see above for range); when projected back to before the Christian era the leap year rule remains unchanged; in the Finnish Orthodox Church, which currently uses the Gregorian Paschalion, five Easter tables would be used in the next 900 years (involving six switches) because two tables are used twice. There would be no change over any 900-year cycle if the Revised Julian calendar were used, but the Exigian calendar (so named to avoid having to describe it every time it came up in discussion) requires only four switches because no table is used twice.)

To find how many days the civil calendar is ahead of the Julian in any year from 301 BCE (the calendar is proleptic [assumed] up to 1582 CE) add 300 to the year, multiply the hundreds by 7, divide by 9 and subtract 4. Ignore any fraction of a day. When the difference between the calendars changes the calculated value applies on and from 1 March (civil date) for conversions to Julian. For earlier dates reduce the calculated value by one. For conversions to the civil date the calculated value applies on and from 29 February (Julian date). Again, for earlier dates reduce the calculated value by one. The difference is applied to the calendar one is converting into. A negative value indicates that the Julian date is ahead of the civil date. In this case it is important to remember that when calculating the civil equivalent of 29 February (Julian), 29 February is discounted. Thus if the calculated value is −4 the civil equivalent of this date is 24 February. Before 1 CE use astronomical years rather than years BCE. The astronomical year is (year BCE) – 1.

Up to the 4th century CE, these tables give the day of the Jewish month to within a day or so and the number of the month to within a month or so. From the 4th century, the number of the month is given exactly and from the 9th century the day of the month is given exactly as well.

In the Julian calendar, every 76 years the Jewish year is due to start 5h 47 14/18m earlier, and 3d 18h 12 4/18m later in the week.

Example calculation

On what civil date does the eighth month begin in CE 20874–5?

20874=2026+(248×76). In (248×76) Julian years the Jewish year is due to start (248×3d 18h 12 4/18m) later in the week, which is 932d 2h 31 2/18m or 1d 2h 31 2/18m later after removing complete weeks. Allowing for the current difference of thirteen days between the civil and Julian calendars, the Julian date is 13+(248×0d 5h 47 4/18m) earlier, which is 72d 21h 28 16/18m earlier. Convert back to the civil calendar by applying the formula.

20874+300=21174
211×7=1477
1477/9=164 remainder 1
164−4=160.
160d−72d 21h 28 16/18m=87d 2h 31 2/18m.

So, in 20874 CE, the Jewish year is due to begin 87d 2h 31 2/18m later than in 2026 CE and 1d 2h 31 2/18m later in the week. In 20874 CE, therefore, the Jewish year is due to begin at 11.30 3/18 am on Friday, 14 June. Because of the displacements, it actually begins on Saturday, 15 June. Odd months have 30 days and even months 29, so the starting dates are 2, 15 July; 3, 13 August; 4, 12 September; 5, 11 October; 6, 10 November; 7, 9 December, and 8, 8 January.

The rules are based on the theory that Maimonides explains in his book Rabbinical Astronomy. (Note: No allowance is made for the secular (centennial) decrease of ½ second in the length of the mean tropical year and the increase of about four yards in the distance between the Earth and the Moon resulting from tidal friction because astronomy was not sufficiently developed in the 12th century (when Maimonides wrote his book) to detect this.) The times in the list are those calculated by Gauss with an offset of −14 days as his calculation gives the civil date of Passover rather than the start of the month. Gauss's calculation has been rigorously proved.

== Other uses ==
- There is also a month in the Assyrian calendar called Nisanu with a similar root of the word that Nisan which comes from of which Nisanu comes from the Akkadian of Akkad, Assyria and Babylonia nisānu, which derives from Sumerian nisag "First fruits".
- "Nisan" is also the name for the month of April in Levantine and Mesopotamian Arabic (Arabic: نيسان), a later Semitic language (see Arabic names of Gregorian months), in Kurdish languages and modern Turkish. Maghrebi and Gulf state Arabic use the modified Latin name "Ibril".
- In the story of Xenogears, "Nisan" is the name of a country, named after the Hebrew month.
- Quartodecimanism

== See also ==
- Jewish astrology
- Chaitra – First month of the Hindu calendar
- Computus – Calculation of the date of Easter (originally based on Nisan)
