= Judith Hemmendinger =

German-born Israeli researcher (1923–2024)

- Judith Hemmendinger, in the 1980s
- Born: Judith Feist; 2 October 1923; Bad Homburg vor der Höhe, Hesse-Nassau, Prussia, Germany
- Died: 24 March 2024 (aged 100)
- Education: University of Strasbourg (PhD, 1981)
- Occupations: Researcher, author
- Spouse: Claude Hemmendinger
- Children: 3
- Writing career
- Language: French
- Subject: Child survivors of the Holocaust
- Notable works: The Children of Buchenwald: Child Survivors of the Holocaust and Their Post-war Lives (1984; trans. 2000)
- Notable awards: French Legion of Honor (2003)

Judith Hemmendinger (née Feist, 2 October 1923 – 24 March 2024) was a German-born Israeli researcher and author who specialised in child survivors of the Holocaust. During World War II, she was a social worker and refugee counselor for the Œuvre de secours aux enfants (OSE), a French Jewish children's aid organization based in Geneva, and from 1945 to 1947, she directed a home for child survivors of Buchenwald in France. She authored books and papers on the Holocaust experiences and later lives of child survivors. She was awarded the French Legion of Honor in 2003.

== Early life ==
Judith Feist was born on 2 October 1923, in Bad Homburg vor der Höhe, Germany, to Phillip Feist, a native of Frankfurt who worked as a mining engineer, and his wife Hannah, née Eisenmann. She was a great-granddaughter of Eliezer Liepman Philip Prins. Her family was Orthodox Jewish and well-off. She was the second of five children. When she was five years old, her father found employment in the Parisian suburb of Eaubonne and moved the family to France. As the only Jews in their locale, the Feist children attended public school, where they spoke French and learned secular subjects, while, at home, they spoke German and were tutored in Hebrew and the Bible. When her older sister began high school, Judith's family moved to Paris.

== World War II ==
The outbreak of World War II in September 1939 found the Feists on their annual summer vacation in Megève, southern France. Phillip Feist was arrested as an enemy alien and deported to a detention camp in Normandy. The rest of the family was assigned to a house in Megève. Upon Phillip's release in June 1940, the family traveled to Roanne in the French Free Zone. However, German officials advised Phillip to return to Paris, while his wife and children stayed in Roanne. Later, Phillip traveled to Nice to open a school, at the behest of Rabbi Schneour Zalman Schneersohn. He was arrested at the Nice train station and interned in the Gurs internment camp. He was afterwards deported to the Drancy internment camp and on to Auschwitz in September 1943, where he was murdered on the same day he arrived.

In summer 1942, Judith began working at a youth hostel for hidden children operated by the Œuvre de secours aux enfants (OSE), a French Jewish children's aid organization based in Geneva. On 1 January 1943, she traveled under the alias of Jacqueline Fournier to Taluyers, and joined a covert hakhshara (Zionist agricultural training institute) operated by the Éclaireuses et Éclaireurs israélites de France under the guise of an agricultural school. The student body of 22 young Jewish men and women all carried false papers. She developed a relationship with one of the students, Claude Hemmendinger, but in September 1943, her mother called her to accompany her and her younger siblings on an escape to Switzerland, following her father's arrest. The family trekked over the Alps with a guide, but was arrested after crossing the border and was detained in Geneva.

After their release, they were sent to a refugee camp, where Judith worked as a teacher. She applied for a six-month course being offered by the OSE to train social workers "to deal with the post-war situation", and was accepted. As part of her job, she interviewed child refugees traveling under false papers to find out their true identities, with the goal of re-uniting them with their families after the war.

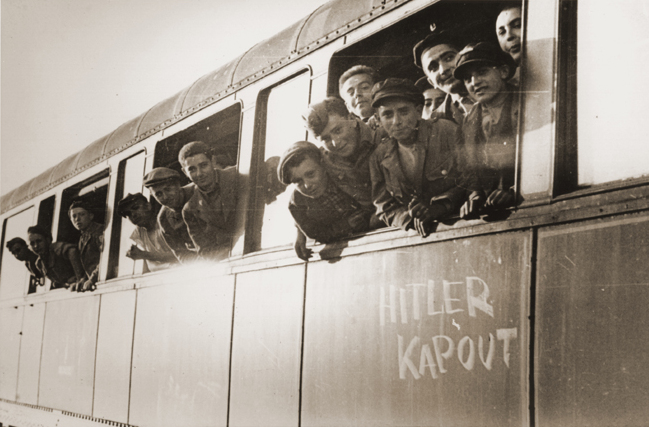
Jewish youth liberated from Buchenwald en route to the OSE children's home in Ecouis, France.

In May 1945, she responded to the OSE's call for volunteers to care for child survivors of the Buchenwald concentration camp. She traveled to the Chateau d'Ambloy in Loir-et-Cher, France, where a home had been set up for 90 to 100 teenage boys from Orthodox homes who had requested kosher facilities and a higher level of religious observance than that being provided to the larger group of Buchenwald child survivors in France. Though only 22 years of age, Judith replaced the director, who found it difficult to relate to the youth. She stayed with the home on its move to the Chateau de Vaucelles in Taverny in October 1945, and remained as its director until September 1947, when the last child had found a permanent placement. Among the boys under her care were Yisrael Meir Lau, the future Chief Rabbi of Israel; his brother Naphtali Lau-Lavie; Menashe Klein, the future Ungvarer Rav; and Elie Wiesel. Explaining her success with the boys, who had displayed extreme trauma and anxieties upon their arrival in France, she said: "I loved them, I never judged them, I became attached to them, and I felt that it was reciprocal".

After the home closed, Judith went to London to stay with her aunt and uncle. There, she received a letter from Claude Hemmendinger, her fellow student at the hakhshara, who wished to see her again. They met in Paris and were married in September 1948. At first, they settled on a kibbutz in Beit She'an, Israel, but returned to Claude's mother's home in Strasbourg after the death of his father. They resided in Strasbourg for 20 years. They had two sons and one daughter.

== Education and research ==
In Strasbourg, Judith Hemmendinger began seeing a psychotherapist to work through her wartime experiences. Upon the family's return to Israel in 1969, she undertook a formal education, earning her bachelor's degree in Jerusalem, her master's degree at Bar-Ilan University, and her PhD at the University of Strasbourg in 1981. Her doctoral thesis was titled "Rehabilitation of Young Camp Survivors after the Death Camps".

In 1982, she published the paper "Psychosocial adjustment 30 years later of people who were in Nazi concentration camps as children". In 1984, she co-authored, with Elie Wiesel, Les enfants de Buchenwald: que sont devenus les 1000 enfants juifs sauvés en 1945? (The children of Buchenwald: What became of the 1,000 Jewish children rescued in 1945?) (Favre, 1984), and in 1986, Survivors: Children of the Holocaust (National Press, 1986). Dr. Robert Krell, a Holocaust survivor, saw the Dutch translation of the 1984 book, and in 2000, he translated it into English with supplementary material under the title The Children of Buchenwald: Child Survivors of the Holocaust and Their Post-war Lives (Gefen, 2000).

Hemmendinger remained in contact with the Buchenwald children and their offspring for years. In 1970, she was invited by the child survivors to a dinner commemorating the twenty-fifth anniversary of the liberation of Buchenwald.

In 2003, she was awarded the French Legion of Honor for her work to rehabilitate the child survivors of Buchenwald.

Hemmendinger died on 24 March 2024, at the age of 100.

== Publications ==
- La vie d'une Juive errante: de Bad-Homburg vor der Höhe à Jérusalem [The Life of a Wandering Jew: From Bad-Homburg vor der Höhe to Jerusalem] (in French). Harmattan. 2008. ISBN 978-2296067967.
- Les enfants de Buchenwald [The Children of Buchenwald] (in French). L'Harmattan. 2002. ISBN 978-2747516426.
- Revenus du néant: cinquante ans après, l'impossible oubli : 23 témoignages [Revenge of the Nothing: Fifty years later, the impossible forgetting: 23 testimonies] (in French). Harmattan. 2002. ISBN 978-2747523257.
- The Children of Buchenwald: Child Survivors of the Holocaust and Their Post-war Lives. Gefen Publishing House Ltd. 2000. ISBN 978-9652292469. (with Dr. Robert Krell)
- Survivors: Children of the Holocaust. Bethesda, Md: National Press. 1986. ISBN 978-0-915765-24-9.
- Les enfants de Buchenwald: que sont devenus les 1000 enfants juifs sauvés en 1945? [The Children of Buchenwald: What became of the 1,000 Jewish children rescued in 1945?] (in French). P. M. Favre. 1984. ISBN 978-2828901431. (with Elie Wiesel)

== Sources ==
- Goldberger, Leo; Breznitz, Shlomo, eds. (2010). Handbook of Stress (2nd ed.). Simon and Schuster. ISBN 978-1-4516-0233-3.
- Heberer, Patricia (2011). Children During the Holocaust. Rowman Altamira. ISBN 978-0-7591-1986-4.
- Hemmendinger, Judith; Krell, Robert (2000). The Children of Buchenwald: Child Survivors of the Holocaust and Their Post-war Lives. Gefen Publishing House Ltd. ISBN 978-9652292469.
- Niven, William John (2007). The Buchenwald Child: Truth, Fiction, and Propaganda. Harvard University Press. ISBN 978-1-57113-339-7.
