= Abbai =

Abbai may refer to:

- One of the civilizations in Babylon 5
- Blue Nile, also known as the Abbai river

== See also ==
- Abba (disambiguation)
- Abbayigaru, a 1993 Indian film
- Abbayitho Ammayi, a 2016 Indian film
