= Menashe Klein =

Czechoslovak-born Israeli-American rabbi

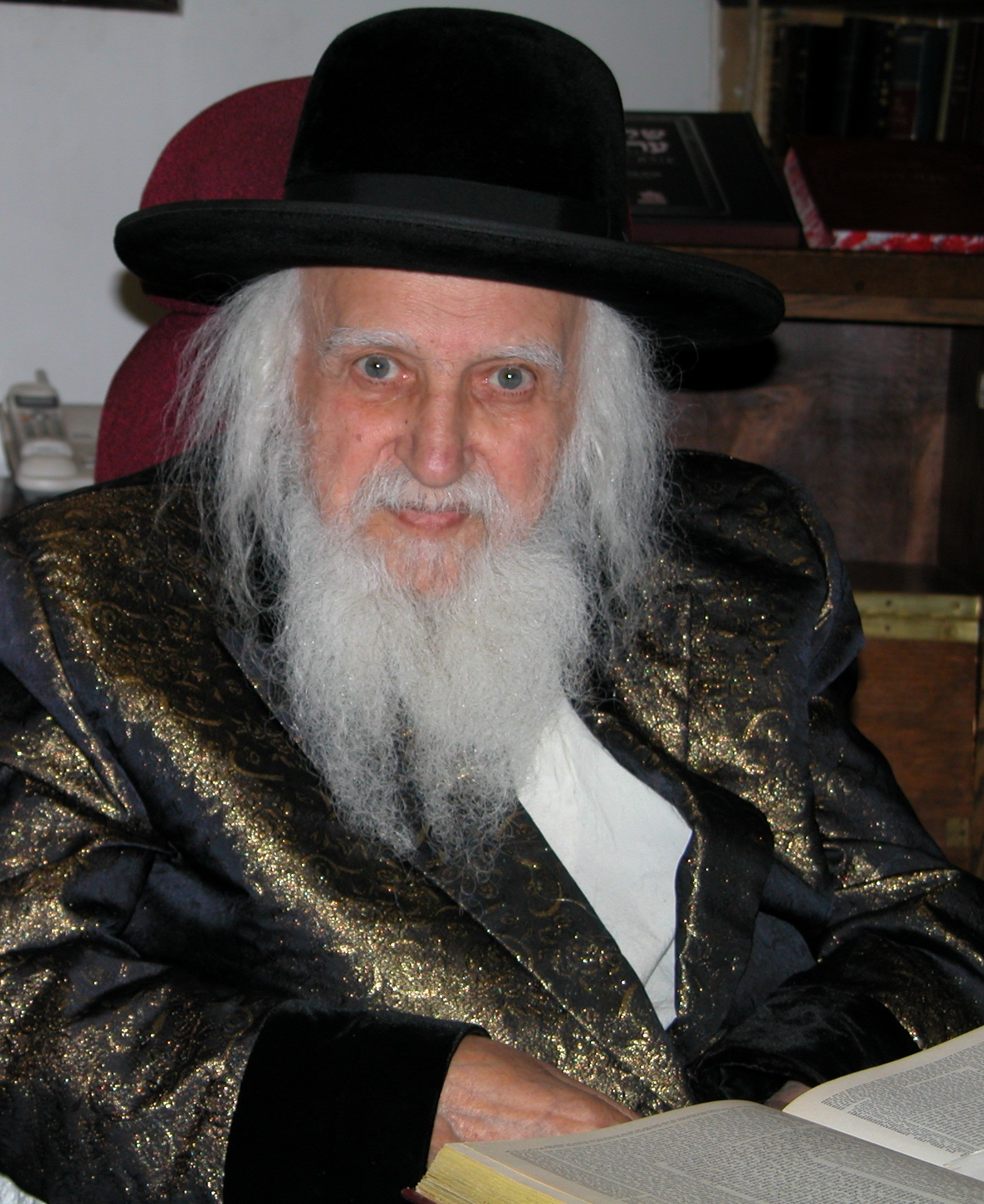
Menashe Klein in Boro Park, 2006

Menashe Klein (Hebrew: מנשה קליין; 1924–2011), also known as the Ungvarer Rav (Yiddish: אונגווארער רב), was a Hasidic Rebbe and posek (arbiter of Jewish law). He authored 18 volumes of responsa, spanning over 50 years, entitled Mishneh Halachos. Additionally, he authored some 25 other seforim, including a commentary on Simeon Kayyara's BeHag. Toward the end of his life, he relocated from Brooklyn, New York to Jerusalem.

== Biography ==
Menashe Klein was born in 1924 in the town of Orlova, Czechoslovakia (now known as Irlyava, Ukraine) near the city of Ungvar, Czechoslovakia (now known as Uzhhorod, Ukraine). He studied in the yeshiva of the Rav of Ungvar, Yosef Elimelech Kahane.

During World War II, he was incarcerated in Auschwitz-Birkenau, Auschwitz-Buna, and finally in Buchenwald. At Buchenwald, he was sent out to "Stein," a Nazi satellite camp at Eschershausen, but was listed in camp records as returned to Buchenwald, where he was liberated and where he completed a postwar military interview.

On June 2, 1945, he was evacuated by train with 427 other former Buchenwald inmates ages 7 to 17 – among them Yisrael Meir Lau, Naphtali Lau-Lavie, and Elie Wiesel – to France, where they boarded at a sanitarium in Écouis. He was transferred to Ambloy together with about 100 other boys who desired kosher facilities and a higher level of religious observance. This group was under the supervision of social worker Judith Hemmendinger, who attempted to re-acclimate the boys to normal living. The group was transferred to Taverny after Yom Kippur 1945. Klein immigrated to the United States in 1947.

After World War II, he served as Rav in the "Chevrah Liyadi" shul, (which was located in the Williamsburg section of Brooklyn) and Principal of Yeshivas Shearis Hapleitah, under the direction of Yekusiel Yehudah Halberstam, Klausenberger Rebbe. In 1964, he founded Yeshiva Beis Shearim in Borough Park, Brooklyn, where he served as rosh yeshiva.

In 1983, he established "Kiryat Ungvar" in the Ramot section of Jerusalem in memory of his hometown. Today, it is a thriving neighborhood with hundreds of inhabitants.

In 1998, he established "Zichron Kedoshim Square" in honor of the people of Ungvar, Czechoslovakia that were erased as a result of the Holocaust, Mayor of New York City Rudy Giuliani Signed Bill that Adds the Name "Zichron Kedochim Square" to the Intersection of 53rd Street and 16th Avenue in Brooklyn.

The Ungvarer Rav was active until old age. He had thousands of students.

In 2009, he stirred controversy. He published a responsa which, in part, denoted Chabad messianists as "apikoras" (heretics). At the time, he referred to them and was quoted; "This sect of crazies, which falsify the Torah and our sages' words, to say the Moshiach is dead but is really alive... these are things against our holy Torah." Referring to Chabad messianism within Chabad which has adopted the late Rebbe, Menachem Mendel Schneerson as the Jewish messiah.

He died on the last day of Elul (September 28) 2011, and was buried in Safed Old Jewish Cemetery, near the grave of the Arizal, the Alshich Hakadosh and Beis Yosef.

After his passing his three sons assumed the mantle of leadership, each establishing their court in the place of their residence: the oldest son, David Shlomo, in Ramot, Jerusalem, the second son, Amrom, in Borough Park, Brooklyn, and the third son, Moshe, in Modi'in Illit. Amrom's son Eliezer Zev opened a yeshiva, Bais Shearim, in the Geulah neighborhood in Jerusalem where hundreds of students study.

== Works ==
Mishneh Halachos (Hebrew language Hebrew: משנה הלכות) is an 18-volume set of responsa authored by Klein. These responsa span over a course of about 50 years, and cover every aspect of the Torah.

In the early 1960s, he published a book entitled Mitzvos Hamelech (Hebrew: מצות המלך), a sefer designated to learn each day, on the 613 Mitzvos. This program is called Mitzva Yomis.
