= Raba Bar Jeremiah =

Babylonian rabbi

Abba or Raba (Rabbah) Bar Jeremiah (cited in the Jerusalem Talmud as R. Abba bar Jeremiah; Hebrew: רבה בר ירמיה or רבי אבא בר ירמיה) was Babylonian rabbi of the third century (second generation of amoraim).

== Biography ==
He was the son of Jeremiah bar Abba and a pupil of Rav. He lived at Sura and transmitted to his generation the sayings of Rav and Samuel.

Several of his sayings are preserved in Palestinian sources. Among them, he interprets Proverbs 9:1-3 ("Wisdom has built her house...") as referring to the Messianic age. The "house" is the newly erected Temple in Jerusalem; the "seven pillars" are the seven years following the defeat of Gog and Magog (as indicated in Ezekiel 39:9); the "feast" is that described in Ezekiel 39:17; and the verse, "She has sent forth her maidens..." means: "The Lord sent forth the prophet Ezekiel with the message to the birds and beasts".
