= Pápa =

Town in Veszprém County, Hungary

- Town
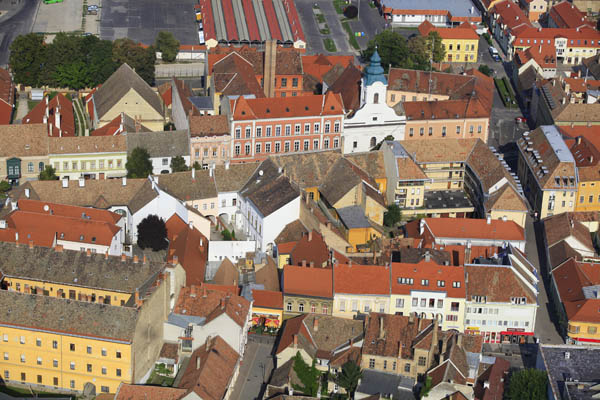

- Flag Coat of arms

- Location of Pápa Pápa (Europe)
- Coordinates: 47.32373°N 17.46802°E
- Country: Hungary
- County: Veszprém
- District: Pápa

Area
  - Total: 91.47 km^{2} (35.32 sq mi)

Population (2024)
  - Total: 28,549
  - Density: 338/km^{2} (880/sq mi)
- Time zone: UTC+1 (CET)
  - Summer (DST): UTC+2 (CEST)
- Postal code: 8500
- Area code: (+36) 89
- Website: papa.hu

Pápa [ˈpaːpɒ] is a historical town in Veszprém county, Hungary, located close to the northern edge of the Bakony Hills, and noted for its baroque architecture. With its 28,549 inhabitants (2024), it is the cultural, economic and tourism centre of the region.

Pápa is one of the centres of the Reformed faith in Transdanubia, as the existence of numerous ecclesiastical heritage sites and museums suggest. Due to the multitude of heritage buildings the centre of the town is now protected.

Pápa has a large historical centre, with renovated old burgher's houses, cafes, and museums, including the Blue-Dyeing Museum (Kékfestő Múzeum), set up in a former factory which produced clothes and other textiles dyed with indigo blue under a unique method.

The town is also noted for its thermal baths, particularly a newly constructed swimming complex, the Esterházy family's palace, its grand Roman Catholic church, and Calvinist secondary school; the town is an important religious centre. It also boasts a large park near the centre of town.

The town has been the main center of trade in the wines of the Somló wine region. Pápa was an administrative regional capital from 1945 to 1983.

== History ==
Pápa is a historic town first mentioned in records in 1061. It is possible that the town (originally a royal manor) was named after the kindred Pápa. Its importance and development is proved by the fact that in the 14th century the town was given civic privileges and at the beginning of the next century it became a market-town, which evolved from the 11 villages that occupied the current territory of the town during the Middle Ages. Large landowning families and various religious orders played an important role in the development of Pápa as a city: the Franciscans settled here in 1475 and the Paulists in 1638.

In the late Middle Ages it was the most important centre of Protestantism in Transdanubia. Reformationist doctrines swept in at the start of the Reformation. The first Hungarian translation of the Catechism of Heidelberg was printed in 1577. After Sopron and Sárvár, this town became the third most important centre of Protestantism in Transdanubia.

A Reformed Church school operated here as early as in 1531, which was later expanded with a faculty of theology and an academy of law. The castle of Pápa already stood in the 15th century, and in Turkish times it became part of the system of border fortresses.

Construction of the current town centre began in the late 18th century, when it looked surprisingly similar to how it does today, hence its heritage protection status. The castle was converted into a palace, the lake that used to protect the castle from the east was drained, and a monumental church was built on the main square.

Between 1929 and 1945, Pápa was a county town and from 1945 to 1983 a district town. World War II caused immeasurable losses to the city as a whole. The palace and the synagogue were severely damaged, the archives were destroyed.

On 18 November 2007, Pápa Air Base was selected to host three NATO C-17 Globemaster III transport aircraft of the future Heavy Airlift Wing which was activated in 2009.

=== Jews in Pápa ===
Jews were permitted to settle in 1748, which helped Pápa to grow into a regional trade centre. By the 19th century, Hungary's third most significant Jewish community had gathered and the third largest synagogue was built here in 1846.

The anti-Jewish laws of 1938–39 caused great hardship in the community, and from 1940 the young Jewish men were sent to forced labour battalions, at first within Hungary, but later to the Russian front (1942). The Jewish population in Pápa increased from 452 in 1787 to 2645 in 1840 (19.6% of the total population), and 3,550 in 1880 (24.2%). After the beginning of the 20th century, a gradual decline began. There were 3,076 Jews in 1910 (15.3%), 2,991 in 1920, 2,613 in 1941 (11%) and 2,565 in 1944.

After the German occupation on March 19, 1944, the Jews were confined in a ghetto on May 24 and from there moved to a concentration camp which was set up in a factory in the town. On July 4 and 5, 2,565 Jews of the city plus 300 from the vicinity were deported to Auschwitz concentration camp from which less than 10% returned. In 1946 there were 470 Jews in the town (2% of the population) and by 1970 the number had fallen to 40. There are no Jews left in Pápa. The last rabbi of the community before World War II, Rabbi Yosef Greenwald, established a community called Pupa in the United States, and today it exists as a Hasidic court, called "Pupa".

== Climate ==
Pápa's climate is classified as oceanic climate (Köppen Cfb). The annual average temperature is 10.8 °C (51.4 °F), the hottest month in July is 21.0 °C (69.8 °F), and the coldest month is 0.1 °C (32.2 °F) in January. The annual precipitation is 597.4 millimetres (23.52 in), of which June is the wettest with 71.2 millimetres (2.80 in), while February is the driest with only 29.4 millimetres (1.16 in). The extreme temperature throughout the year ranged from −21.7 °C (−7.1 °F) on January 12, 2003 to 39.4 °C (102.9 °F) on August 8, 2013.

Climate data for Pápa, 1991−2020 normals
Month	Jan	Feb	Mar	Apr	May	Jun	Jul	Aug	Sep	Oct	Nov	Dec	Year
Record high °C (°F)	16.7 (62.1)	20.8 (69.4)	23.2 (73.8)	29.9 (85.8)	32.3 (90.1)	36.5 (97.7)	38.6 (101.5)	39.4 (102.9)	32.5 (90.5)	27.1 (80.8)	23.6 (74.5)	17.8 (64.0)	39.4 (102.9)
Mean daily maximum °C (°F)	3.6 (38.5)	6.3 (43.3)	11.4 (52.5)	17.3 (63.1)	21.5 (70.7)	25.3 (77.5)	27.5 (81.5)	27.4 (81.3)	22.0 (71.6)	16.2 (61.2)	9.9 (49.8)	4.4 (39.9)	16.1 (61.0)
Daily mean °C (°F)	0.1 (32.2)	1.8 (35.2)	6.0 (42.8)	11.2 (52.2)	15.5 (59.9)	19.3 (66.7)	21.0 (69.8)	20.6 (69.1)	15.7 (60.3)	10.9 (51.6)	5.9 (42.6)	1.1 (34.0)	10.8 (51.4)
Mean daily minimum °C (°F)	−3.3 (26.1)	−2.2 (28.0)	1.0 (33.8)	5.3 (41.5)	9.6 (49.3)	13.0 (55.4)	14.6 (58.3)	14.3 (57.7)	10.5 (50.9)	6.4 (43.5)	2.3 (36.1)	−2.2 (28.0)	5.8 (42.4)
Record low °C (°F)	−21.7 (−7.1)	−20.3 (−4.5)	−17.6 (0.3)	−8.7 (16.3)	−2.2 (28.0)	1.8 (35.2)	5.9 (42.6)	4.8 (40.6)	−0.7 (30.7)	−9.7 (14.5)	−11.0 (12.2)	−21.7 (−7.1)	−21.7 (−7.1)
Average precipitation mm (inches)	30.0 (1.18)	29.4 (1.16)	33.9 (1.33)	37.4 (1.47)	65.6 (2.58)	71.2 (2.80)	58.0 (2.28)	68.9 (2.71)	67.5 (2.66)	51.9 (2.04)	46.2 (1.82)	37.4 (1.47)	597.4 (23.52)
Average precipitation days (≥ 1.0 mm)	5.7	5.5	6.5	6.6	8.8	7.6	7.5	6.6	6.7	6.7	7.4	6.5	82.1
Average relative humidity (%)	81.5	75.7	69.6	65.1	68.8	69.9	68.3	68.9	74.6	79.7	83.4	85.6	74.1
Source: NOAA

== Main historical buildings ==
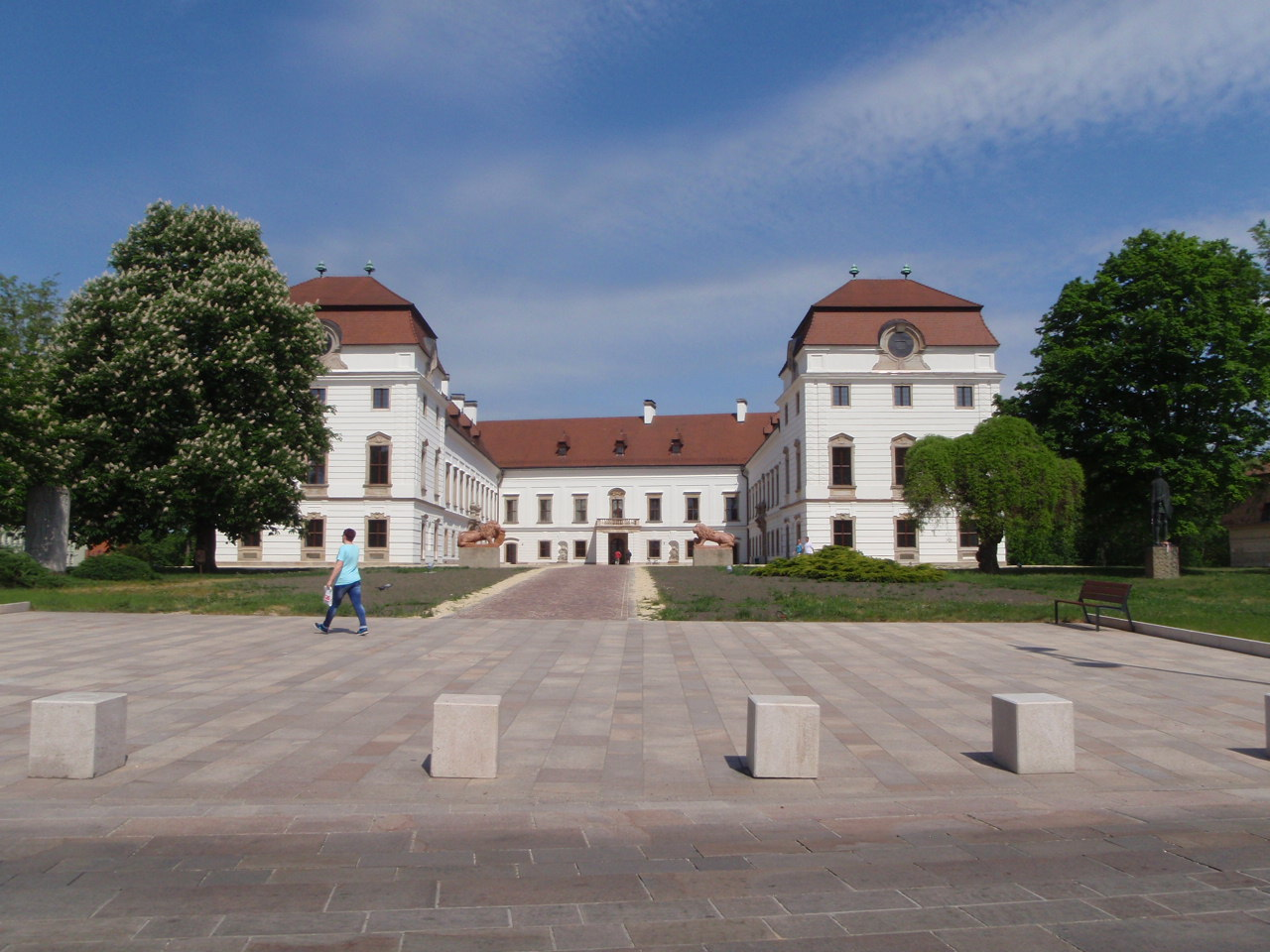
Esterhazy Palace

Pápa won the János Hild Memorial Medal in 1989 for restoration work creating a beautiful townscape in the town. After the Reformation, new church and educational traditions were initiated. A new grammar school was built, the Reformed College recommenced its activities and higher education began once again.

A symbol of the town is the Great Church in the Main square, which was built according to the plans of Jakab Fellner between 1774 and 1786. It was decorated with frescoes by Franz Anton Maulbertsch.

The "white church" in the Main street built by the Paulists, later home of the Benedictine order, was completed by 1744. Its furnishing is valuable decorated with unique wood-carving. The 17th century so called Black Christ can be found in its parvis.

The Franciscan church is in Barát Street, it was built between 1678 and 1680. Pápa has been the centre of the Transdanubian Reformed Church, whose famous college was founded in 1531. Its spirituality has had a significant role in the life of the town since then.

In 1844, Pápa's local Jewish community began building a synagogue in the town's predominantly Jewish neighborhood. In continuing his family's good relations with the local Jewish community, Count Paul Esterhazy de Galanthay donated 100 thousand bricks to assist in the synagogue's construction. Construction of the new synagogue was completed in 1846, and its opening service was officiated by Rabbi Leopold Löw (the rabbi is credited for being the first to introduce the Hungarian language into his services). The building was vandalized by the Nazis.

The population is largely descendants of German settlers, who came here mostly in the 18th century.

Pápa is considered to be a school town. The present building of the college was built between 1895 and 1899. Today a secondary school of six and four classes and the Pápa Reformed Collection (library, archives, museum) can be found there. The Old College is in Petőfi Sándor street, beside it there is a plaque on the house where Sándor Petőfi, Hungary's National Poet, at one time dwelt.

The Calvinist old church houses the permanent exhibition of the Museum of Religious Art. The painted sarcophagus of the Egyptian Hori (High Priest of Osiris) made between 1186-1070 B.C. is exhibited here.

The famous Museum of Blue-dyeing is opposite the Calvinist College. The blue-dyeing workshop of the Kluge family was one of the most significant in Central Europe. Active until 1956, its original furnishings and equipment can be seen today.

Another important building of the Main Square is the building complex of the Esterházy-mansion. The reading hall of the library in the mansion was awarded the Europa Nostra-prize after the restoration of the former mansion chapel. The restoration of the baroque mansion started in 2000 and works are still underway. Apart from the baroque mansion and the Great Church in the Main square, the town is also proud of its baroque dwelling houses. In the historical part of the town there are a number of monuments and locally protected buildings.

== Twin towns – sister cities ==
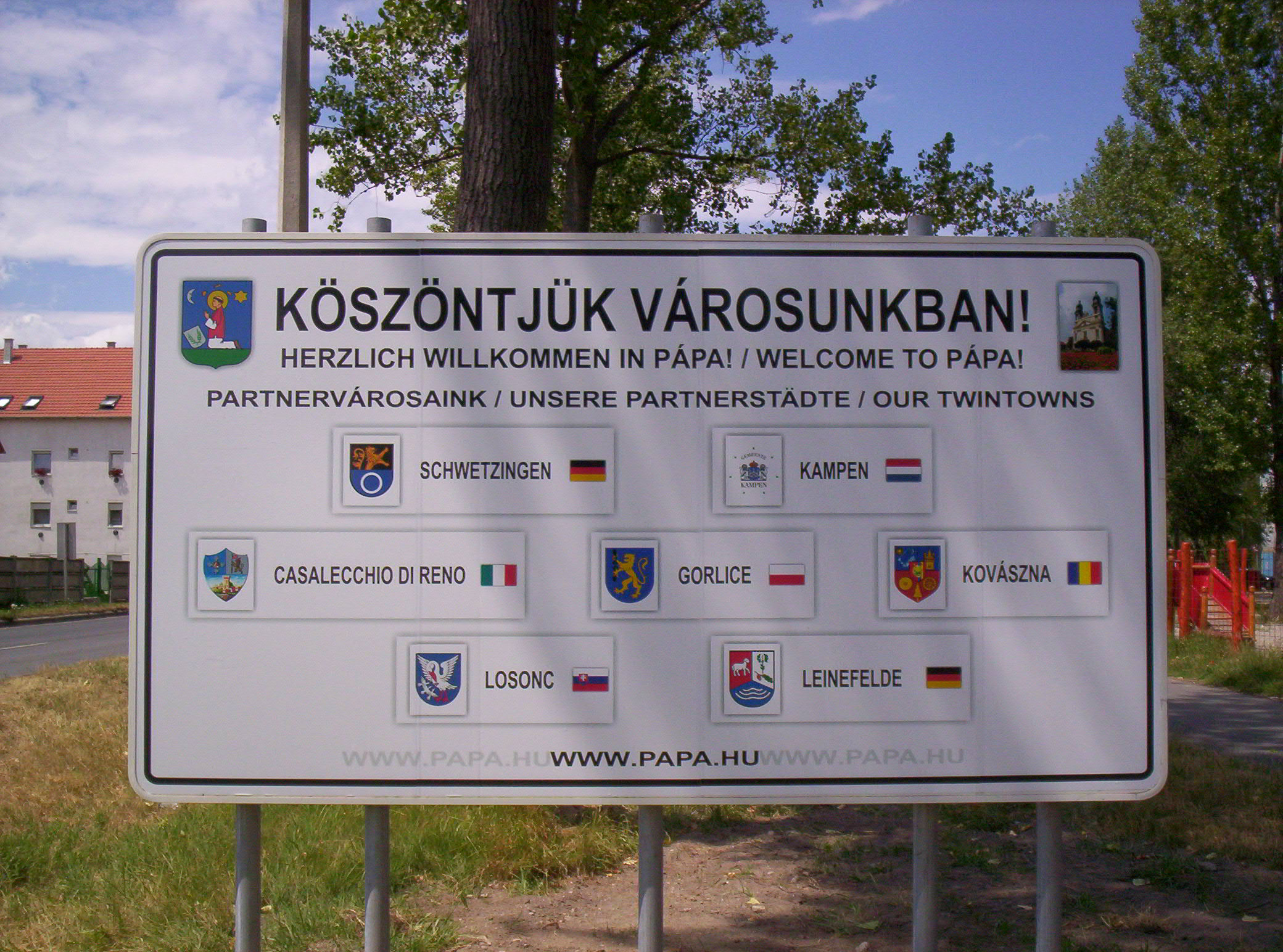
Sign showing twin towns of Pápa

Pápa is twinned with:

- Casalecchio di Reno, Italy
- Covasna, Romania
- Gorlice, Poland
- Hurbanovo, Slovakia
- Kampen, Netherlands
- Leinefelde-Worbis, Germany
- Lučenec, Slovakia
- Schwetzingen, Germany
- Vyshkovo, Ukraine

== Notable people from Pápa ==
- Ignác Bárány, father of Róbert Bárány, Austro-Hungarian Nobel Prize winner 1914 in medicine
- Fülöp Ö. Beck (1873–1945), sculptor
- Lajos Bruck, painter
- Clara Lazar Geroe, leading Australian psychoanalyst was born here in 1900
- Ferenc Gyurcsány, Prime Minister of Hungary (2004–2009)
- László Kövér, President of the National Assembly of Hungary (Országgyűlés) from 2010
- Andrew Laszlo, cinematographer
- Ürge László – Les Murray (broadcaster), Hungarian/Australian Football commentator.
- Johann von Zimmermann

=== Rabbis in Pápa ===
- Leopold Löw (1846-1850)
- Solomon Breuer, Hungarian-born German Rabbi, initially in Pápa, Hungary
- Rabbi Yaakov Yehezkiya Greenwald (I) (1929–1941), rabbi of the Etz Chaim community in Pápa, and the Rosh yeshiva there. Predecessor of the Pupa Hasidic dynasty
  - Rabbi Yosef Greenwald (1941–1946), Rabbi and second Grand Rebbe of the Pupa Hasidic dynasty
- Rabbi Yaakov Yitzhak Neumann, born in Pápa and after surviving the Holocaust, served as head of the remaining Hungarian Puper Jewish community, from which he gained the title, Puper Rav.

== Sport ==
- FC Pápa, association football club
- Pápai FC. association football club
- Pápai PFC, association football club
- Pápai SE, association football club

== See also ==
- Pápa Air Base
- Pupa (Hasidic dynasty)
