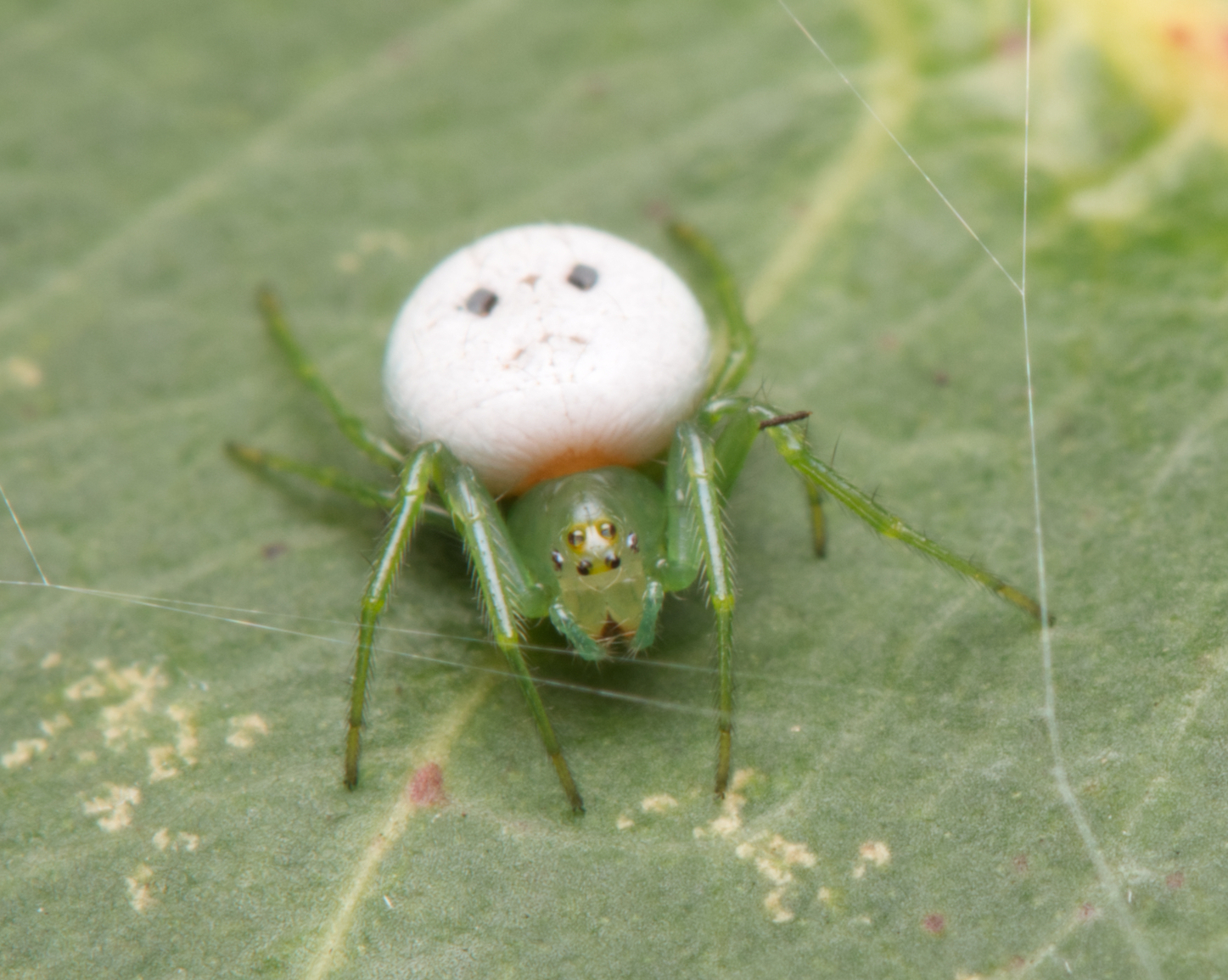
- female A. transversa
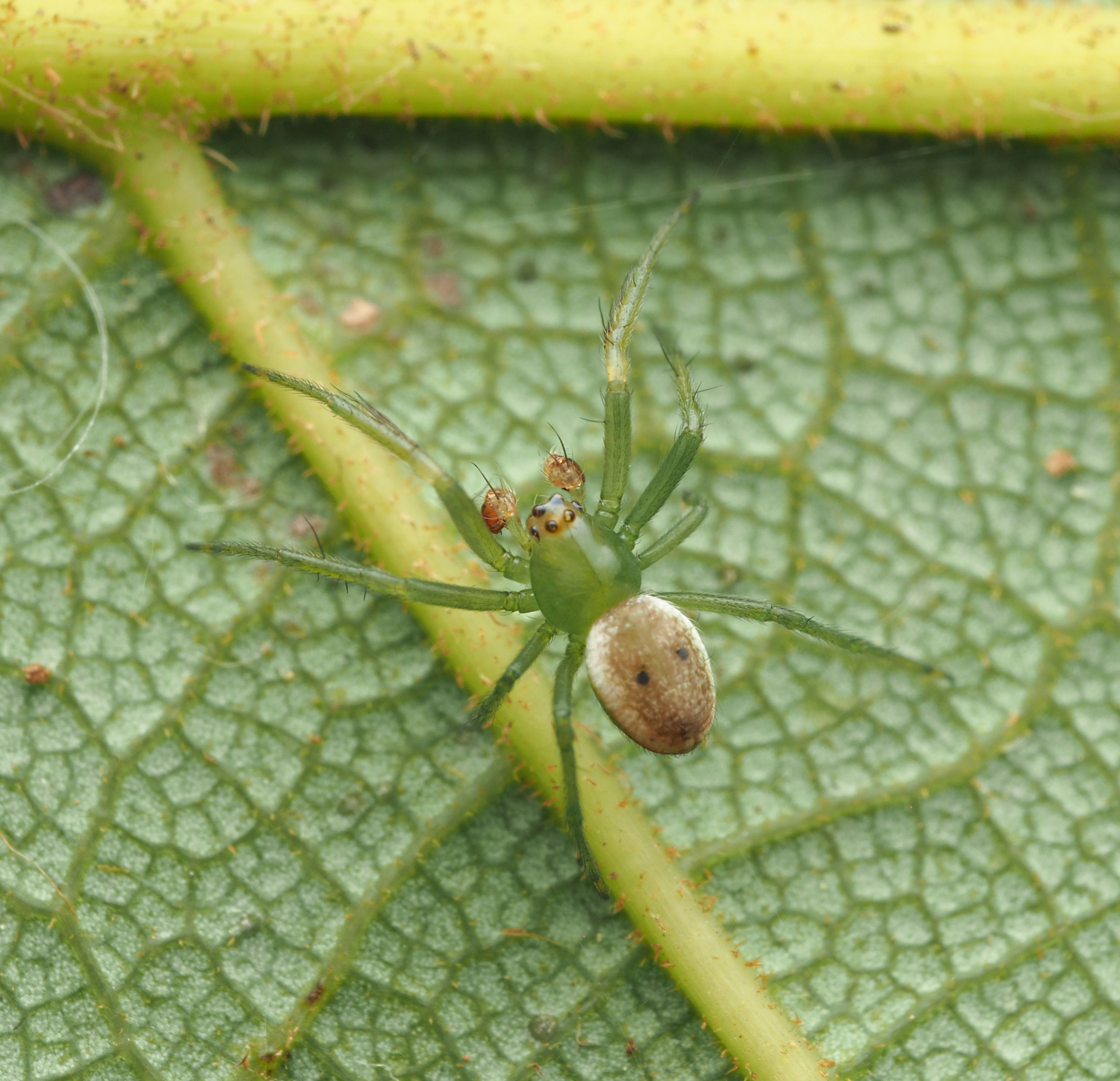
- male A. transversa

Scientific classification
- Kingdom: Animalia
- Phylum: Arthropoda
- Subphylum: Chelicerata
- Class: Arachnida
- Order: Araneae
- Infraorder: Araneomorphae
- Family: Araneidae
- Genus: Abba; Castanheira & Framenau, 2023
- Species: A. transversa

Binomial name
- Abba transversa (Rainbow, 1912)

Synonyms
- Araneus transversus Rainbow, 1912

= Abba transversa =

Species of spider

Abba transversa is a species of orb-weaver spider (family Araneidae), found in Queensland and New South Wales, Australia. It is the only species in the genus Abba.
