= Jeremiah bar Abba =

Babylonian rabbi (mid-3rd century)

Jeremiah bar Abba (or Rav Yirmeyah bar Abba ; Hebrew: רב ירמיה בר אבא) was a Babylonian rabbi who lived around the mid-3rd century (second generation of amoraim). He is cited many times in the Jerusalem Talmud, where he is mentioned simply as Rav Jeremiah, without his patronymic name.

Some identify Jeremiah bar Abba with Jeremiah Rabbah (Rabbah = "the Great"), a sage who lived in Basra. According to this assertion he also lived in Basra.

== Biography ==
Little is known about Jeremiah's family: His father was named "Abba", and was a famous Baal teshuva of his generation. (According to another version: the brother of his father, called "Aha" was the famous Baal teshuva). Huna b. Hiyya (of Pumbdita) was his son-in-law, and his son and grandson are also mentioned as sages. For a certain period of time he lived in a place called Shumtamya, which is not known from any other sources.

His son was the rabbi Raba Bar Jeremiah.

Jeremiah was primarily a student of Rav, and usually acted in accordance with his rulings. However, he was considered as a Fellow Student of his, and would address him in a second, and third Grammatical person form as is common among students and rabbis.

Jeremiah debates many known contemporary scholars: Rav Huna, Judah ben Ezekiel and more. Rav Nachman once addressed him in a matter of a Jewish law. Most of his references in the Talmud are laws delivered by him in the name of the most prominent scholars of his generation: Rav, Samuel of Nehardea, and Yochanan bar Nafcha. Several times he reports that the beit midrash of Rav asked questions to Samuel after the death of Rav, and gives Samuel's answer.

== Jeremiah bar Abba II ==
Some are of the opinion that there were two sages named Jeremiah bar Abba, one in the second Amora generation, and the other in the third generation, This is based on the words of Ulla, that Jeremiah was the student of Rav Huna, the pupil of Rav. According to that opinion, the statements of Jeremiah in the name of Yochanan bar Nafcha belong to the latter one.
