= Abaá =

Type of longhouse in Equatorial Guinea

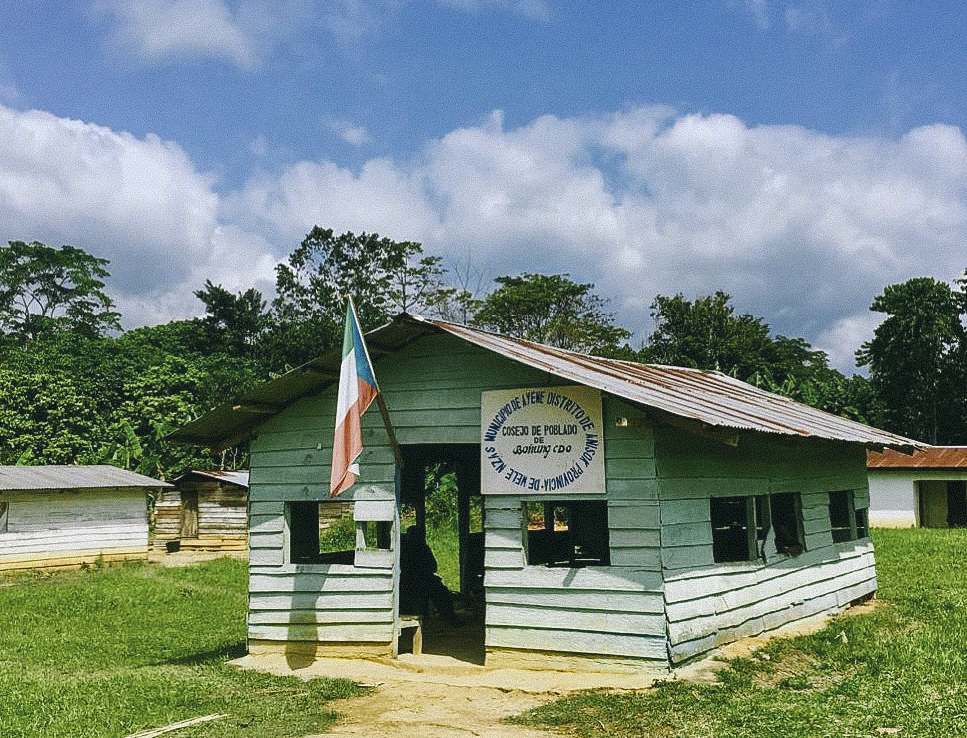
Abaá in the town of Buñong (Ayene municipality, Añisok district, Wele-Nzas province).

An abaá or abahá (from the Fang language, abáá 'house of the word') is a longhouse located in cities and towns of Equatorial Guinea, especially those of the Fang ethnic group. The abaá has an official, religious and leisure function; In it, activities of all kinds are carried out, cooking, celebrating and men meet to make relevant decisions for the entire community. It is considered a symbolic place of unity and solidarity, and the supreme traditional head of the abaá is called "abbá".

Formerly, in the center of the house a sacred column, decorated with reliefs called àbòm-àbàà, used to be placed. The abaá was located at both ends of the town to act as a guard house; the alarm was raised with a drum (hollow trunk) called 'nkúú that according to the rhythm of the touches could communicate complex messages, and could even be heard from neighboring towns, transmitting information from one side of the valley to the other. Today, these practices are less and less common, and the abaá is built in the center of the town. The construction and maintenance of the abaá are also done in common.

The Fang, also called Betí, Pahouin, Pangwe or Pamue, are one of the majority ethnic groups in the country. Fang women are not allowed to enter the abaá, unless they serve food or testify in litigation.

The word "abaá" is one of the thirty of Equatorial Guinean origin in the Dictionary of the Royal Spanish Academy. They were incorporated into it in 2013, which defines the abaá as a "communal house". The other ethnic groups in the country have equivalent communal centers. They are known as mwebe in Ndowé, mpa in Bisío, riebapuá or wedja bohôté in Bubi and vidyil in Fá d'Ambó. In Spanish it is frequently called "House of the Word", a name that spread during colonial times.
