= Accredited Business Accountant =

Accredited Business Accountant (ABA) is one of the trademarked credentials offered by the privately operated Accreditation Council for Accountancy and Taxation (ACAT).

An alternative equivalent trademarked ACAT credential, ABA may be used by accredited individuals who work in states where non-CPAs may not use the term “accountant”, or in states that allow use of the term as a stand-alone word but with a disclaimer.

To receive the certification, individuals must have three years of related work experience, and achieve a 70%+ score on the ABA exam.
