= Yosef Greenwald =

Jewish Hasidic religious leader and Holocaust survivor

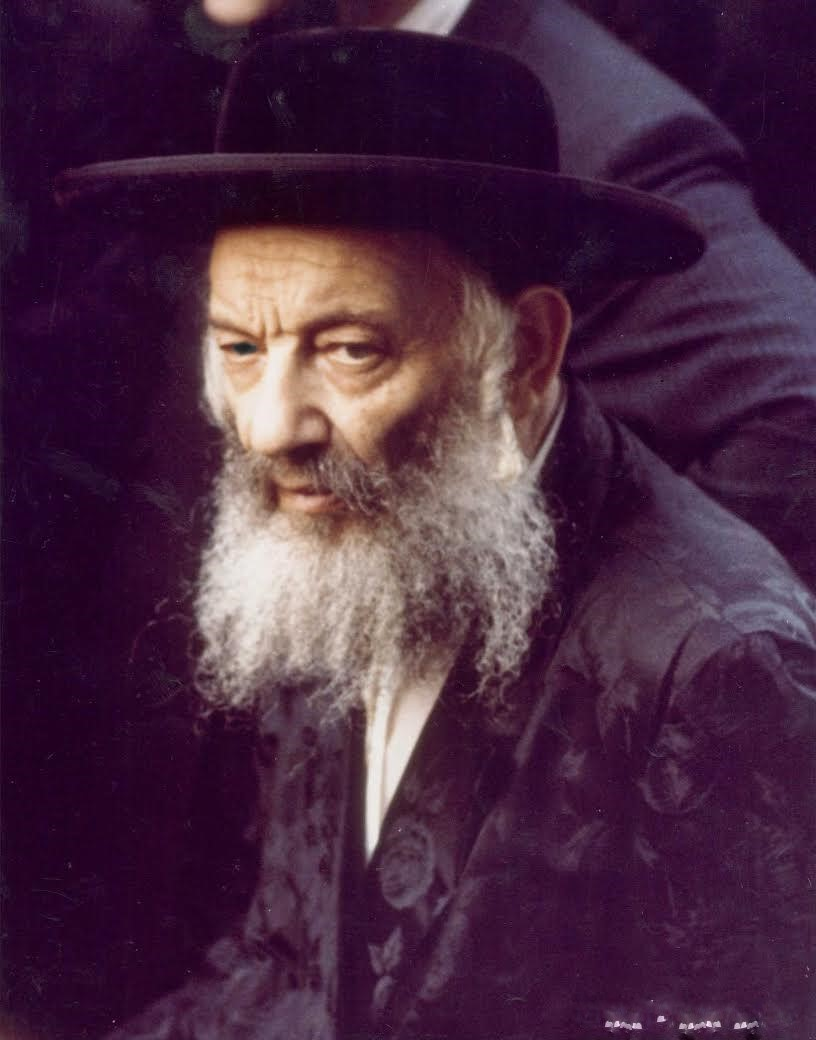
- Title: Pupa Rebbe, the Vaychi Yosef

Personal life
- Born: Joseph Grunwald; 16 September 1903 Brezovica, Slovakia
- Died: 11 August 1984 (aged 80) Westchester Medical Center, Westchester County, New York
- Buried: 12 Aug, 1984
- Spouse: Chana Greenwald, Miriam Weber
- Children: 10 children, including Yaakov Yehezkiya Greenwald
- Parents: Yaakov Yechezkiya Greenwald (I) (father); Sara Rivkah Brown (mother)
- Dynasty: Pupa

Religious life
- Religion: Judaism

Jewish leader
- Predecessor: Yaakov Yechezkiya Greenwald (I)
- Successor: Yaakov Yechezkiya Greenwald (II)
- Began: Adar, 1941
- Ended: 13 Av, 1984
- Main work: Vaychi Yosef
- Yahrtzeit: 13 Av
- Dynasty: Pupa

Yosef Greenwald (Hebrew: יוסף גרינוואלד; 16 September 1903 – 11 August 1984) was the second Rebbe of the Pupa Hasidic dynasty. Before World War II he was a rabbi and rosh yeshiva in Pápa, Hungary.

Greenwald was the son of Yaakov Yechezkiah Greenwald of Pupa and the grandson of Moshe Greenwald.

After the war he moved to Williamsburg, Brooklyn, and established the contemporary Pupa Hasidic movement.

== Early life ==
Greenwald was born on 16 September 1903 (24 Elul 5663) in Brezovica, Hungary, and studied in his father's yeshiva in Pápa, Hungary.

In 1925 he married his grandfather's niece Chana. She had been raised by her uncle Eliezer David Greenwald, whom Yosef Greenwald succeeded as the head of the Keren Ledovid Yeshiva.

== Rabbinic career ==
After his father's death in 1941, Greenwald moved to Papa, Hungary, and began to serve as rabbi and Rosh Yeshivah. He brought additional students from Satmar to study in the yeshiva, and hid roughly 60 young men who fled from Slovakia and Poland.

On 11 May 1944, Greenwald was sent to an Arbeitslager (Nazi labor camp), where his mother was murdered. Toward the end of World War II he hid in the Glass House in Budapest. His wife and ten children were murdered in the Holocaust. After the war he returned to Pápa and re-established the yeshiva.

He was remarried after the war to Miriam Weber (b. 12 October 1918 in Soltvadkert). He moved c. 1946 with the yeshiva, at that time numbering approximately 60 young men, to Szombathely, Hungary. Later they moved to Antwerp, Belgium where Greenwald lived for several years.

=== United States ===
In 1950 Greenwald emigrated to the United States, settling in the Williamsburg section of Brooklyn with several students, where he founded the congregation "Kehilath Yaacov - Pupa", and continued as Admor of the Pupa Chassidut.

He became president of the Central Rabbinical Congress of the United States and Canada c. 1980.

== Death and legacy ==
Greenwald died on August 11, 1984, after a stroke, and was succeeded by his son Yaakov Yechezkia Greenwald II.

His students included Gavriel Zinner and Yaakov Yitzhak Neumann.

== Works ==
- Vaychi Yosef on the Torah
- Vaychi Yosef on Moadim
- Vaychi Yosef on Chanukah
- Vaychi Yosef on the Passover Haggadah
- Vaychi Yosef on tractate Mikvaot
- Responsa Vaya'an Yosef - on four parts of Shulchan Aruch
- Shyorei Mitzvah - printed in the books of his father Vayageid Yaakov
- pamphlet Kelach Shel Eizov - appendix to Haggadah Agudath Eizov
- pamphlet Keneh Bosem appendix to Sefer Arugat HaBoshem on EIChAI
- Pesach Tov - Sermons for the opening of the Yeshiva Zman
- Darkei Yosef - Matters of Musar and the Fear of God
