= Fishel Hershkowitz =

Czechoslovak-born American rabbi

Rabbi Ephraim Fishel Hershkowitz
- Title: Klausenburger Dayan

Personal life
- Born: Ephraim Fishel Hershkowitz; 2 October 1922 Mukačevo, Czechoslovakia
- Died: 27 May 2017 (aged 94) Williamsburg, Brooklyn, New York

Religious life
- Religion: Judaism
- Residence: Williamsburg, Brooklyn, New York

Ephraim Fishel Hershkowitz (Hebrew: אפרים פישל הערשקאוויטש) (2 October 1922 – 27 May 2017), the Haleiner Rav, was an American Hasidic rabbi, the senior Klausenburger dayan in Williamsburg, Brooklyn, New York. He was a respected elder in the American Orthodox community.

== Early life ==
Ephraim Fishel was born on Yom Kippur 1922 (10 Tishrei 5683) in the city of Mukačevo, Czechoslovakia (present-day Zakarpattia Oblast, Ukraine). His father, Rabbi Shlomo Hershkowitz, and his grandfather, Rabbi Avraham Hershkowitz (author of Birkas Avraham al HaTorah) were loyal Spinka Hasidim. When he was older, Ephraim Fishel would accompany them to visit the Spinka Rebbe, Grand Rabbi Isaac Weiss (1875–1944) on every Yom Tov.

As a boy, Ephraim Fishel learned in the local Talmud Torah in Munkács. When he was ready to attend yeshiva, his father did not want to send him to one of the large, Ashkenazi yeshivas of the time for fear that he would lose his Hasidic fervor. Thus, he remained in Munkacs, learning with other bachurim in the Spinka kloiz (synagogue) without a Rav or rosh yeshiva. Occasionally he would ask questions of his uncle, Rabbi Dovid Schlussel, who was a dayan in the rabbinical court of Rabbi Chaim Elazar Spira in Munkacs.

== Leadership ==
Rabbi Hershkowitz played an active role in judging cases of agunahs after the September 11 attacks.

He also gave his approbation to hundreds of sefarim and many organizations benefiting the Jewish world.

He was one of the leading American rabbis honored at the Eleventh Annual Siyum HaShas in Madison Square Garden in 2005, where he read the beginning of Masekhet Berakhot.
