= Abas (sophist) =

Ancient Greek sophist and rhetorician

Philosophical work
- Era: Roman
- Region: Greece
- School: Sophism

Abas (Greek: Ἄβας) was an ancient Greek sophist and a rhetorician about whose life nothing is known. The Suda ascribes to him historical commentaries (in Greek ἱστoρικὰ ὑπoμνήματα) and a work on rhetoric (in Greek τέχνη ῥητoρική). Photius in his Myrobiblion quotes from him, belonging probably to the former work, saying that Abas said the name of the wife of Candaulus in Greek mythology was not Nysai but Abro.

== Sources ==
- "Abas" in Suda
- Smith, William; Dictionary of Greek and Roman Biography and Mythology, "Abas (1)", Boston, (1867)
