= Yaakov Yechezkiya Greenwald II =

American rebbe (born 1948)

Rabbi Yaakov Yechezkiya Grunwald
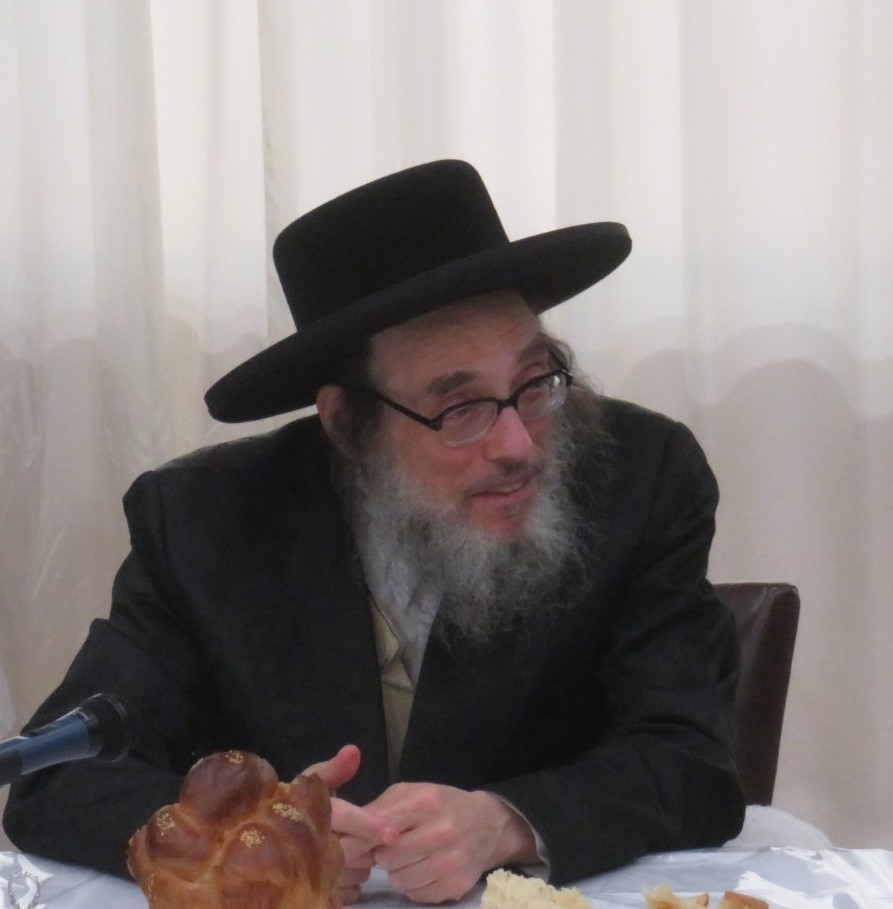
- Pupa Rebbe leading a Tish in Kiryas Pupa
- Title: Pupa Rebbe

Personal life
- Born: Jacob Grunwald; 8 Nisan, 5708 Antwerp, Belgium
- Spouse: Bracha Frieda Grunwald
- Parents: Rabbi Yosef Grunwald (father); Miriam Weber (mother)
- Dynasty: Pupa

Religious life
- Religion: Judaism

Jewish leader
- Predecessor: Rabbi Yosef Grunwald
- Dynasty: Pupa

Rabbi Yaakov Yehezkiya Grunwald (born April 17, 1948) is an American rebbe, the current leader of the Pupa Hasidic group in the United States.

== Biography ==
He was born in Antwerp, the second son of Yosef Greenwald (the last rabbi of Papa, Hungary before the Holocaust) and his second wife, Miriam Weber. When he was a child the family emigrated to the United States, where his father founded the Pupa hasidic dynasty.

He is married to Bracha Frieda.

He served as a dayan (rabbinic judge) and posek of the Pupa hasidim, and on his father's death 1984 succeeded him as the Pupa rebbe.

Most of his followers live in the United States (mainly the state of New York) and Canada, and a few in Israel and London.
