= Eliezer David Greenwald =

Austrian Rabbi (1867–1928)

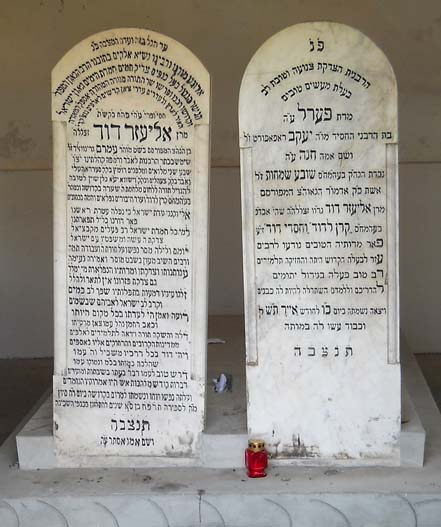
Tombstone of Rabbi Greenwald (L) and his Rebbetzin

Rabbi Eliezer David Greenwald (1867 – 1928) was a rabbi and head of a yeshiva in the cities of Tzehlim (today Deutschkreutz in Austria), Oberwischau (Upper Vishuvah) and Satmar in Transylvania. He is known for his book Keren L'David. Brother of Rabbi Moshe Greenwald, author of "Arugat HaBosem".

== Life ==
He was born in Csorna, Hungary, to Rabbi Amram Greenwald, son of Rabbi Yosef Greenwald, Av Beit Din of Tchechowitz. In his youth, he studied with his brother, the author of Arugat HaBosem. He also studied briefly with Rabbi Shmuel Ehrenfeld, author of "Chatan Sofer".

In 1889 he married the daughter of Yaakov Rapaport of Bardeyov. After his marriage, he spent five years in Bardeyov, where he founded and chaired a yeshiva throughout his stay in the city. At the beginning of 1907 he was elected rabbi of the Jewish community of Tzehlim, where he also headed a large yeshiva. In 1912 he moved to serve as Rabbi of Oberwischau, and headed a yeshiva that numbered hundreds of students. In 1921 he was elected rabbi of the Satmar community, and at the same time he headed a local yeshiva that with 400 students was one of the largest in the region.

His adopted daughter married the grandson of his brother, Rabbi Yosef Greenwald, who was his pupil and worked on printing his books.

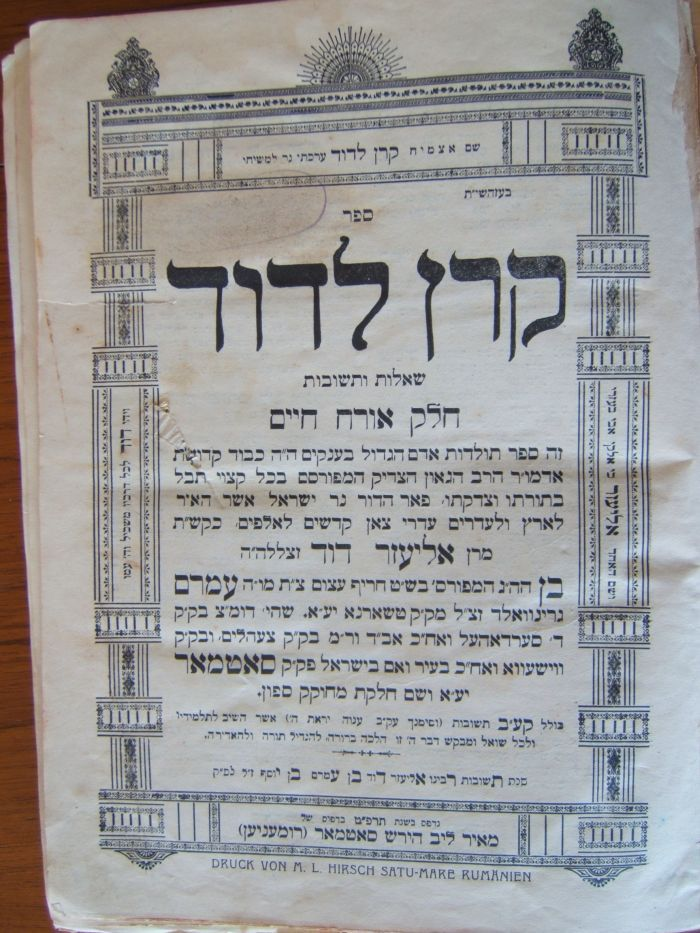
Keren L'David Responsa

== Works ==
- Keren L'David Responsa on Orach Chayim, including 172 responsa, Satmar, 1929
- Sefer Keren L'David - Chidushei Aggadah on the Torah, 2 parts, Satmar, 1930-1939
- Sefer Keren Le-David - Chidushei Aggadah and Drushim for Moadei Hashem, Satmar, 1934
- Passover Haggadah with commentary ... Chasdei David, Satmar, 1934
