= Yaakov Yitzchak Neumann =

Rav of Montreal's Belz community

Rabbi Yaakov Yitzhak Neumann
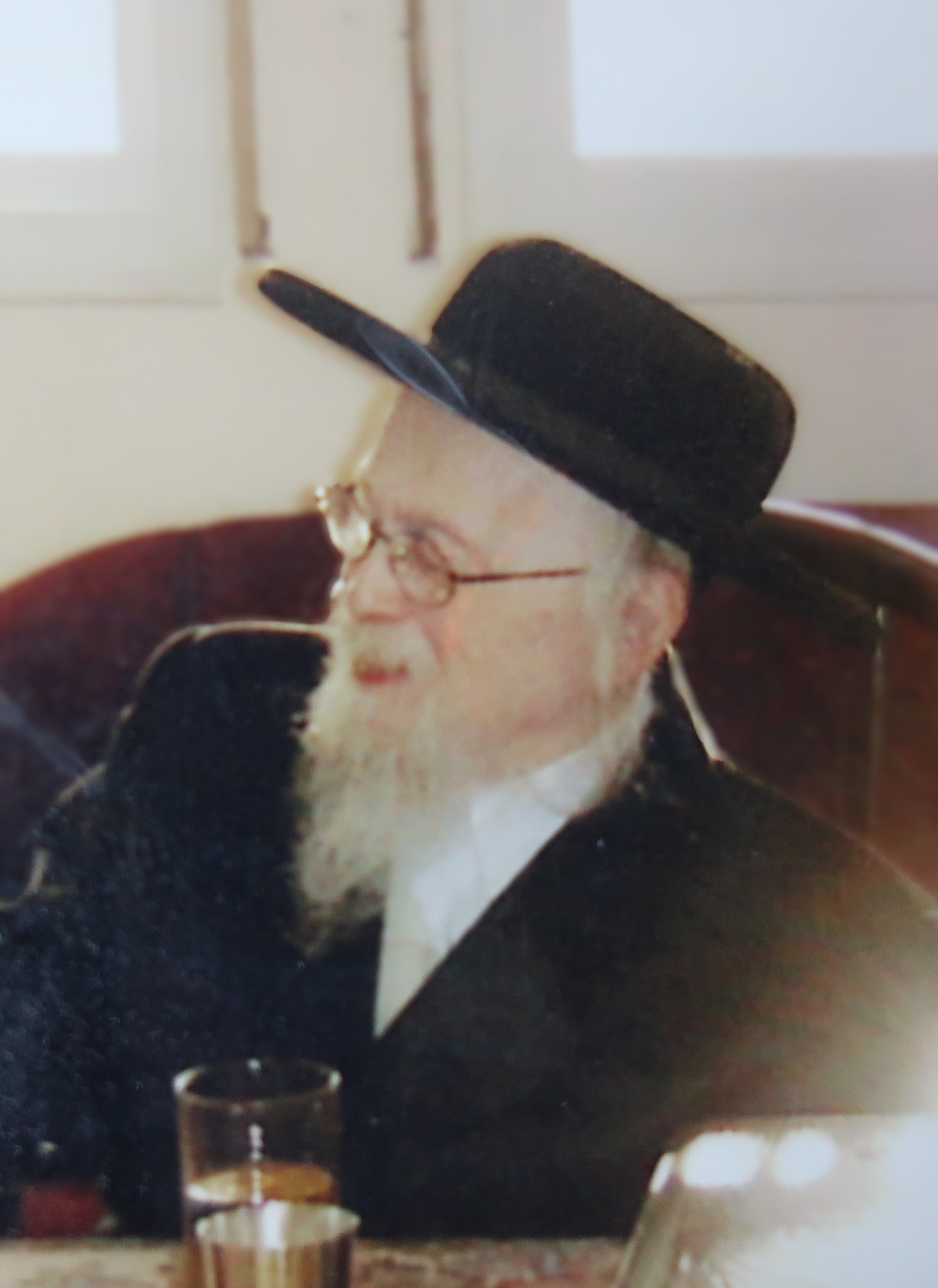
- Rabbi Yaakov Yitzhak Neumann

Personal life
- Born: Yaakov Yitzhak Neumann; 1920 Pápa, Hungary
- Died: 2007 (aged 86–87) Montreal, Canada
- Buried: Kiryas Pupa Cemetery, Ossining, New York
- Spouse: Unknown (died in Holocaust)
- Children: Nuchem (died in Holocaust)
- Parent: Yosef ben Benzion Neumann
- Occupation: Rabbi

Religious life
- Religion: Judaism
- Denomination: Hasidic Judaism

Jewish leader
- Position: Rav of Montreal's Belz community
- Synagogue: Belzer Hasidim, Montreal
- Began: 1953
- Ended: 2007
- Other: Pupa Rav in Hungary and Montreal

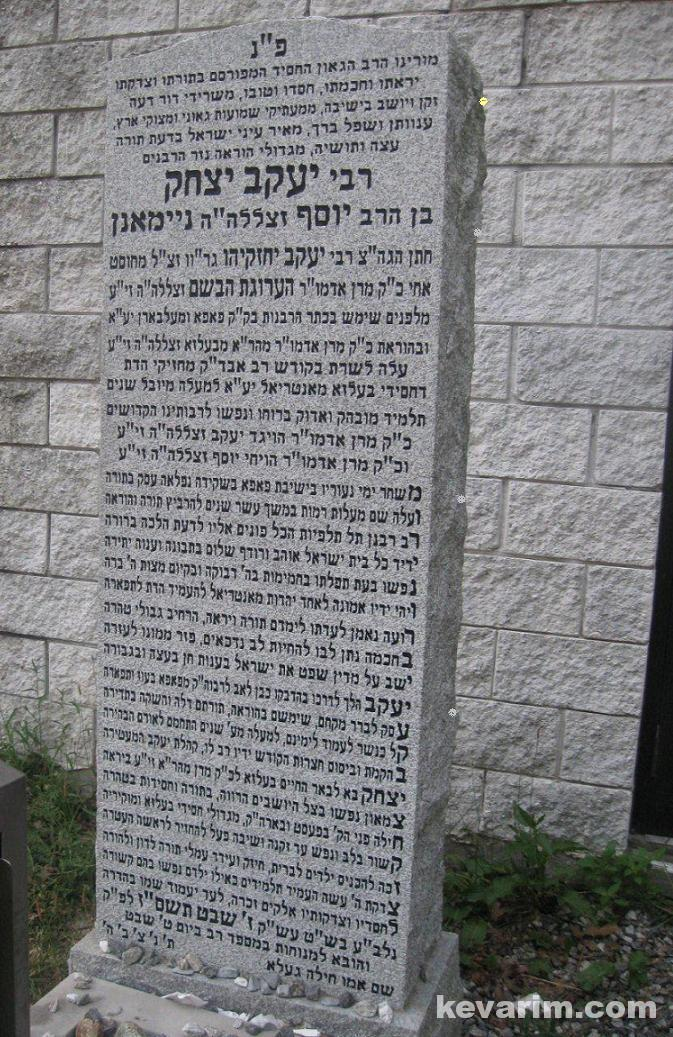
Neumann's tombstone in the Kiryas Pupa Cemetery in Ossinning

Rabbi Yaakov Yitzhak Neumann or Neimann (1920, Pápa, Hungary – 2007, Montreal), also known as "Pupa Rav", was the rabbi of Montreal's Belzer Hasidim from 1953 until his death in 2007.

== Life ==
Neumann was born in Pápa, Hungary. His father Yosef ben Benzion Neuman was also a rabbi.

== Rabbinical career ==
After surviving the Holocaust, in which his wife and only son, Nuchem, were killed, Neumann served as head of the remaining Hungarian Pápa community (c. 1948), from which he gained the title, Puper Rav.

He then emigrated to Australia and then in 1953 to Montreal where there was a Belzer community.

He died in 2007, at 87 without children.

== Sources ==
- Bauer, Julien, "Les communautés hassidiques de Montréal". Dans P. Anctil et I. Robinson (dir.), Les communautés juives de Montréal, Sillery, Septentrion, 2011, p. 216-233.
- Gutwirth, Jacques. "Hassidism and Urban Life". The Jewish Journal of Sociology . 38, 1996, p. 107-15.
- Gutwirth, Jacques. "The Structure of a Hassidic Community in Montreal". The Jewish Journal of Sociology. 14, 1972, p. 43-62.
- Lapidus, Steven. "The Forgotten Hassidim: Rabbis and Rebbes in Prewar Canada". Canadian Jewish Studies Journal/Revue d'études juives canadiennes, vol. 12, 2004, p. 1-30.
- Shaffir, William. "Chassidic Communities in Montreal". The Canadian Jewish Mosaic. Eds. Morton Weinfeld, Irwin Cotler, William Shaffir ed. Rexdale, Ont.: J. Wiley & Sons Canada, 1981, p. 273-86. Print.
- Tannenbaum, Gershon. "Rabbi Koppelman Visits Australia". Jewish Press: Americas Largest Independent Jewish Weekly. Web. 1 November 2010.
- Besser, Yisroel. "Posek, Father, Friend" in Mishpacha magazine: issue 145 February 2007.
