= Moshe Greenwald =

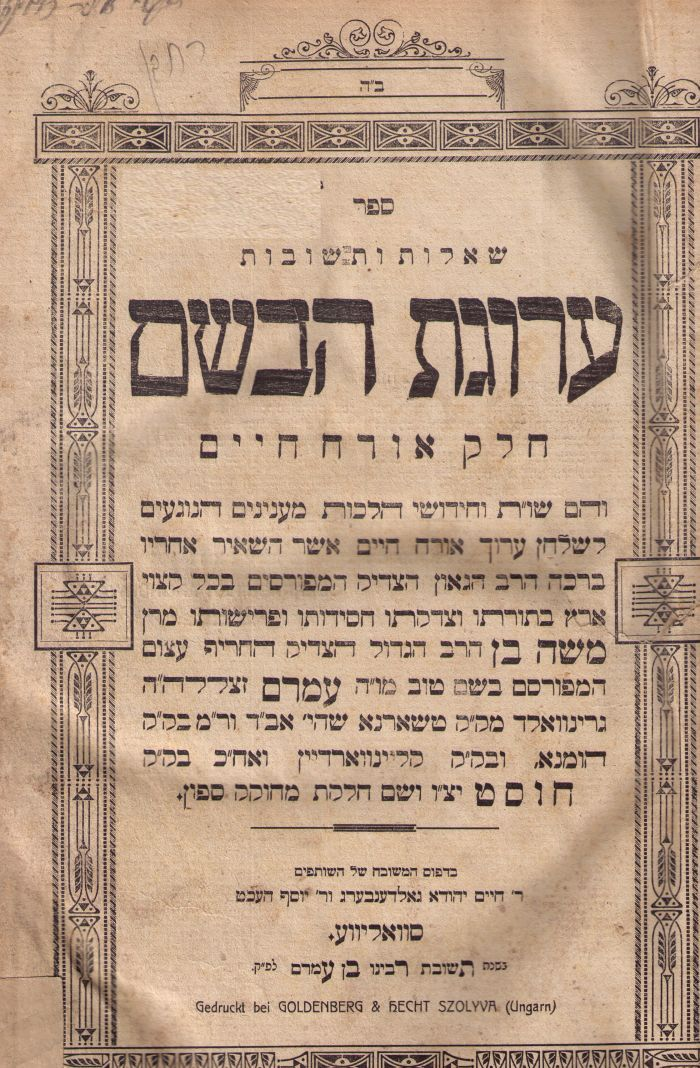
Responsa Arugat HaBosem – First Edition, Svaliava, 1912

Moshe Greenwald (1853–1910), also spelled Grunwald, a rabbi in Hungary at the end of the 19th century. He was the rabbi of Chust, Hungary and progenitor of the Pupa Hasidic dynasty through his son Yaakov Yechezkiya. He was also the author of Arugas Habosem, a book of responsa covering halakhic issues.

== Biography ==
He was the eldest son of Amram Greenwald and studied at the yeshiva of Menachem Katz in Deutschkreutz with his grandfather Yosef Greenwald, and at the Pressburg Yeshiva under Avraham Shmuel Binyamin Sofer. His father died when he was twenty and he worked in timber trading, while continuing his studies. He married his relative Zissel Gestetner.

At the age of twenty-six he began working as a rabbi in Humenné in Hungary (today in Slovakia). In 1887 he became rabbi of Kisvárda in Hungary. Greenwald was originally from a non-hasidic family but as a young man he became a hasid and was a disciple of the second Belzer rebbe, Yehoshua Rokeach.

Greenwald was a rabbi in Humenné, where he established a yeshiva. He became the rabbi of Kisvárda and in 1887 he moved to Khust, where he also headed a yeshiva. In 1893, Greenwald became rabbi of the city of Khost in Hungary (now in Ukraine).

Greenwald opposed Reform Judaism and any deviation from traditional orthodox Judaism.

His descendants include his sons Yaakov Yechezkiya Greenwald, Yaakov's son Yosef Greenwald, and Yosef's son Yaakov Yechezkiya Greenwald II. His students included Leopold Greenwald.
