= Pupa (Hasidic dynasty) =

Hungarian Hasidic dynasty

Pupa Hasidic Dynasty
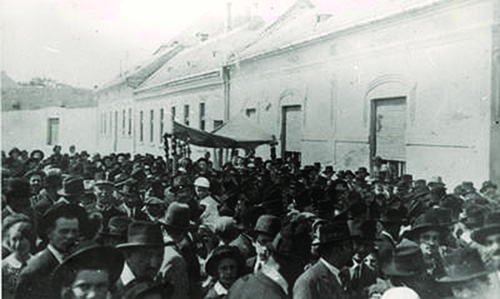
- A new Torah scroll in Pupa, 1934

Total population
- a few thousand followers

Founder
- Moshe Greenwald

Regions with significant populations
- United States, Israel, Canada

Religions
- Judaism

Languages
- Hebrew, Yiddish
- Current headquarters in Williamsburg, Brooklyn

Kehillas Yaakov Pupa (also "Puppa"; Hebrew/Yiddish: קהלת יעקב פאפא) is a Hasidic dynasty, named after the Yiddish name of the town of its origin (known in Hungarian as Pápa).

Before World War II Pupa had a yeshiva. The whole community was deported to the Auschwitz concentration camp, and only a few survived. There are no longer any Jews there.

The group is based in Williamsburg, Brooklyn, with branches in the Boro Park section of Brooklyn, Monsey, New York, Los Angeles, and Ossining, New York. It is headed by the Pupa rebbe, who has several thousand followers.

Pupa has more than 7,000 students enrolled in its yeshivas, girls schools, summer camps, and kollelim in Williamsburg, Boro Park, Monsey, Westchester County, New York, Montreal, Jerusalem, and elsewhere. In Williamsburg, Pupa is second in size to the Satmar Hasidim, with whom they share many communal facilities.

== Lineage ==
- Moshe Greenwald (1853–1910).
  - Yaakov Yechezkiah Greenwald I (1882–1941)
    - Yosef Greenwald (1903–1984)
      - Yaakov Yechezkiya Greenwald II (born 1948)

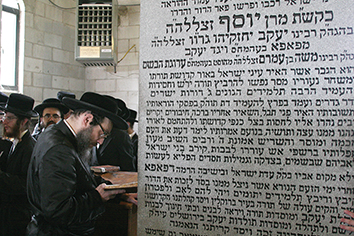
Yaakov Yechezkiya Greenwald II at his father's gravesite

== Kiryas Pupa and Kehilath Yakov Rabbinical Seminary ==
Kiryas Pupa is a village in Ossining, New York, established by Yosef Greenwald. It includes the Kehilath Yakov Rabbinical Seminary, a 4-year school, and a cemetery.

More than 800 students are enrolled in the graduate yeshiva Gedolah, located on a pastoral 140-acre campus.
