= Lothar von Seebach =

German painter (1853 – 1930)

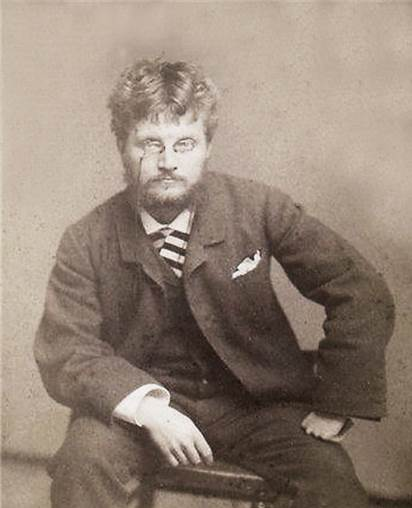
Lothar von Seebach (1880)

Baron Lothar von Seebach (or Lothaire de Seebach; 26 March 1853 – 23 September 1930) was an Alsatian painter, designer, watercolorist and engraver.

== Biography ==
He was born in Fessenbach, now part of Offenburg, and raised in Mannheim, where his father was a garrison officer. In 1875, after completing his studies at the Academy of Fine Arts, Karlsruhe under Ferdinand Keller, he rejoined his family in Strasbourg, where they had lived since the end of the Franco-Prussian War. Like many other painters before him, he set up his studio in the 14th Century Tour de l'Hôpital. Over the next twenty-five years, he made several study trips to England, Berlin and Paris, where he was influenced by the Fauvists. A fiercely independent man who led a simple life, he turned down offers of professorships in Karlsruhe and Strasbourg.

Seebach became a French citizen after World War I, but left Alsace in 1921 as the result of some professional conflicts. He lived briefly at Lake Constance and Frankfurt, then went back to Fessenbach to live with his brother. Ultimately, he returned to Strasbourg where he became renowned for his portrayals of the Old City and its inhabitants, and where he died in 1930.

Seebach was a member of the artistic community known as the "Cercle de Saint-Léonard", named after a village in the commune of Bœrsch in the Bas-Rhin; a group that included Benoît Hartmann, Léon Hornecker, Anselme Laugel, Alfred Marzolff, Georges Ritleng, Joseph Sattler, Émile Schneider, Léo Schnug and Charles Spindler. A street in Robertsau, a suburb to the north of Strasbourg, has been named for him.

== Selected paintings ==
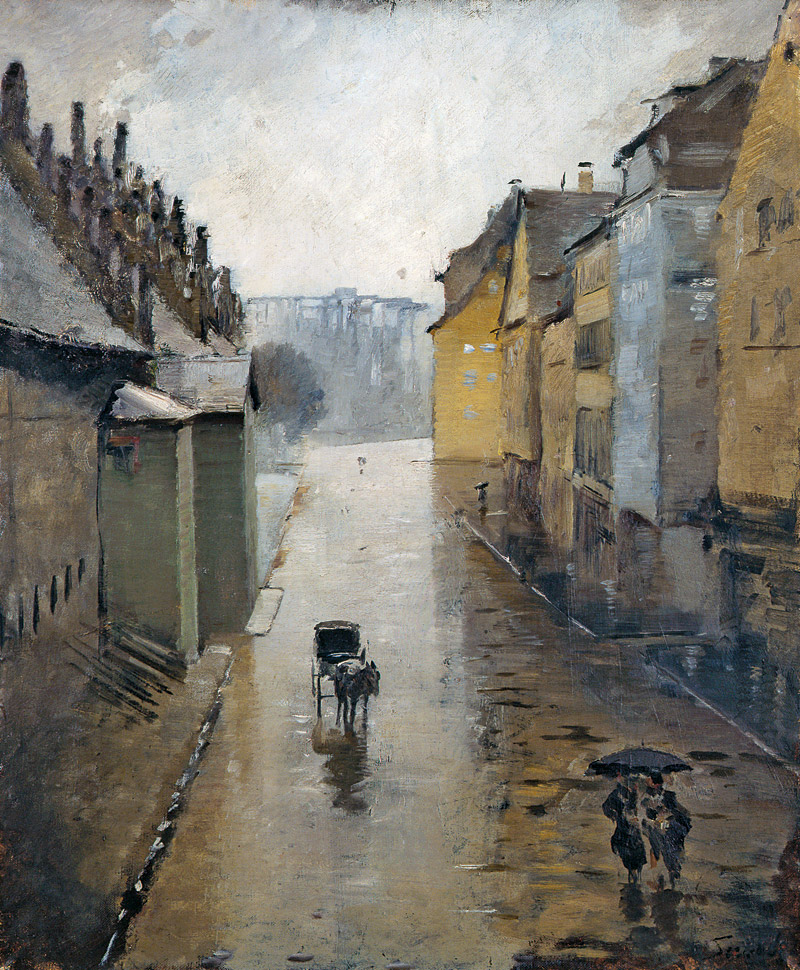
La Rue de la Douane in the Rain (1895)

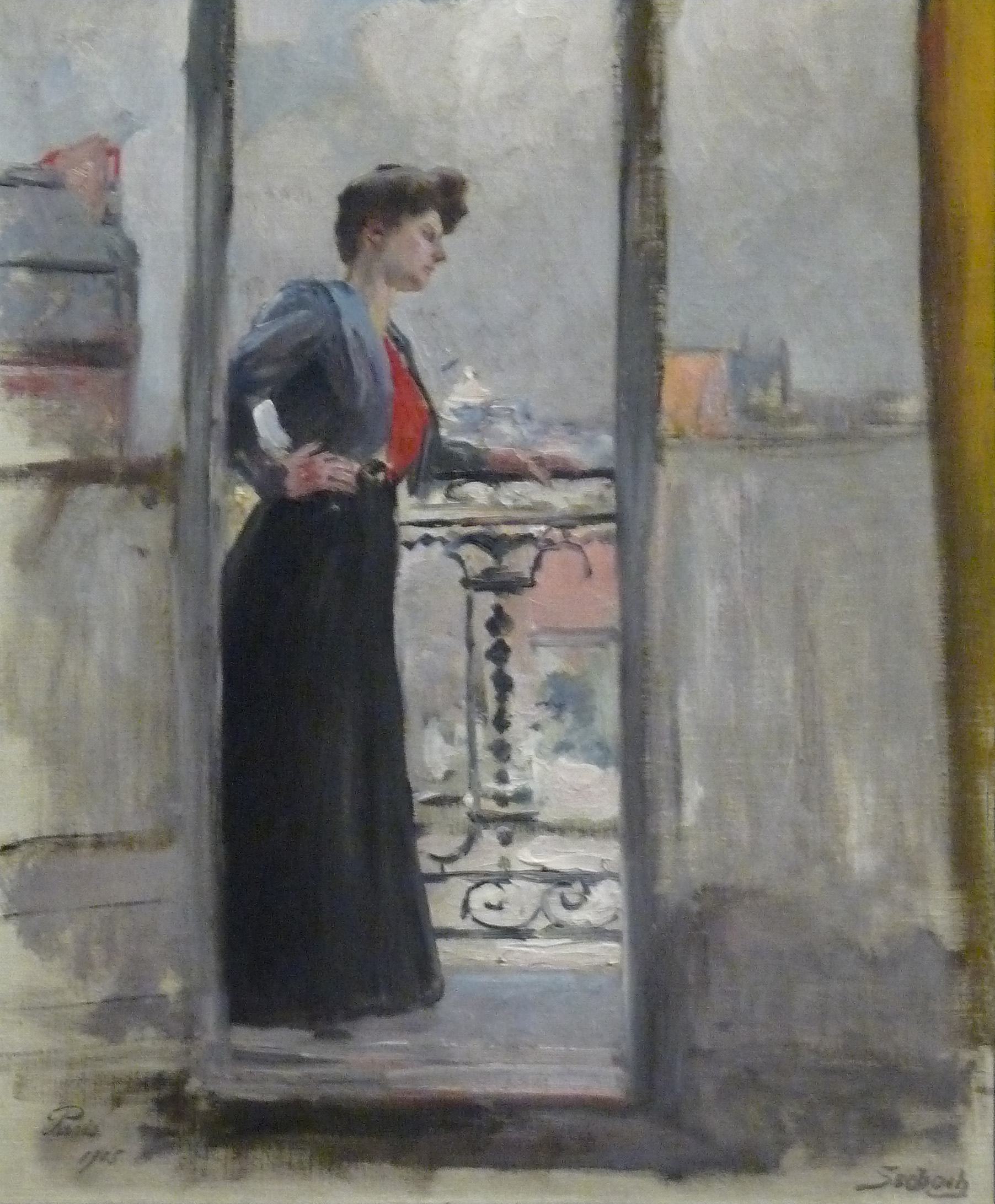
"Plein Air", a Woman on Her Balcony (1905)

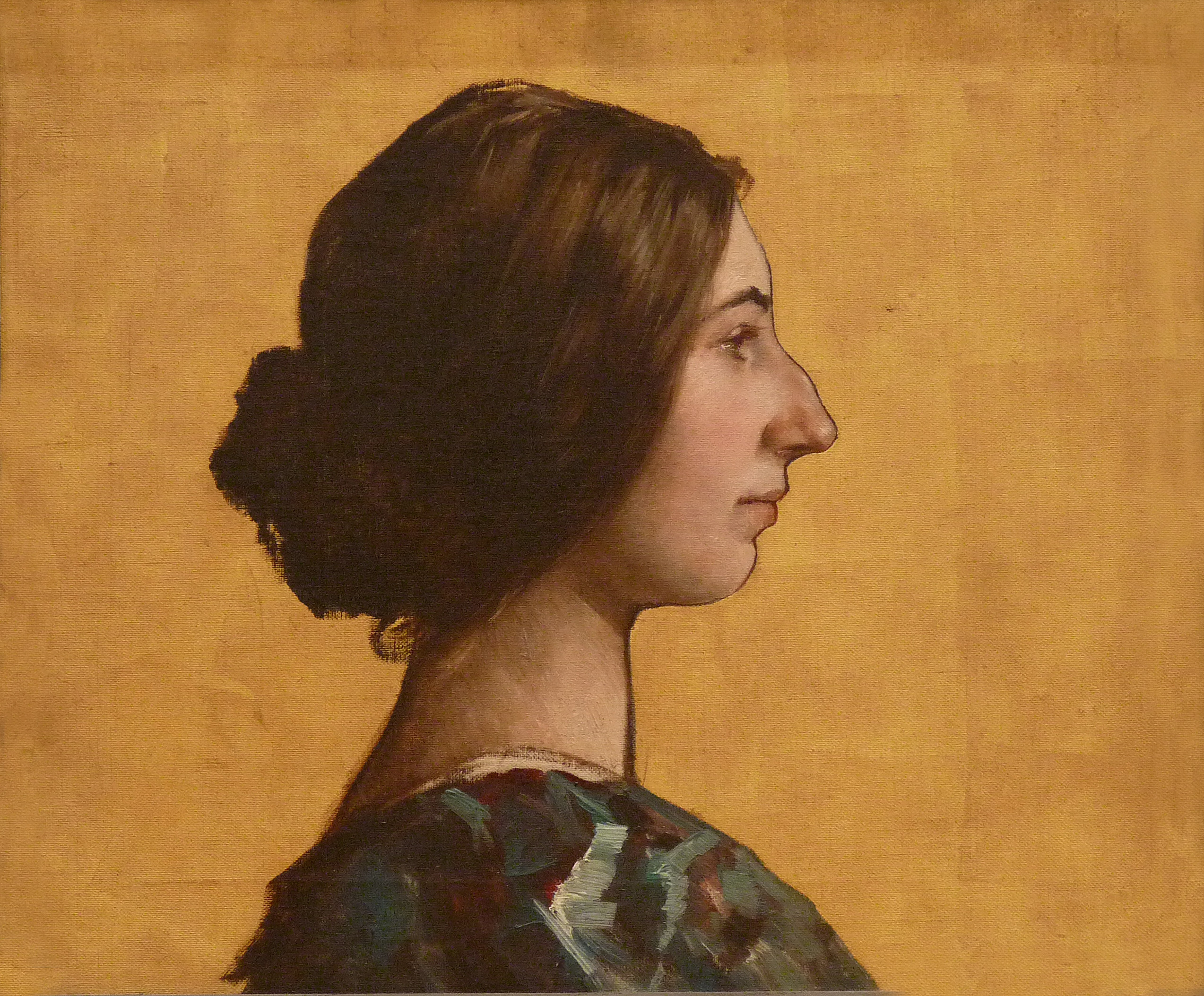
Portrait of the poet Elsa Koeberlé; the daughter of Eugène Koeberlé (1898)

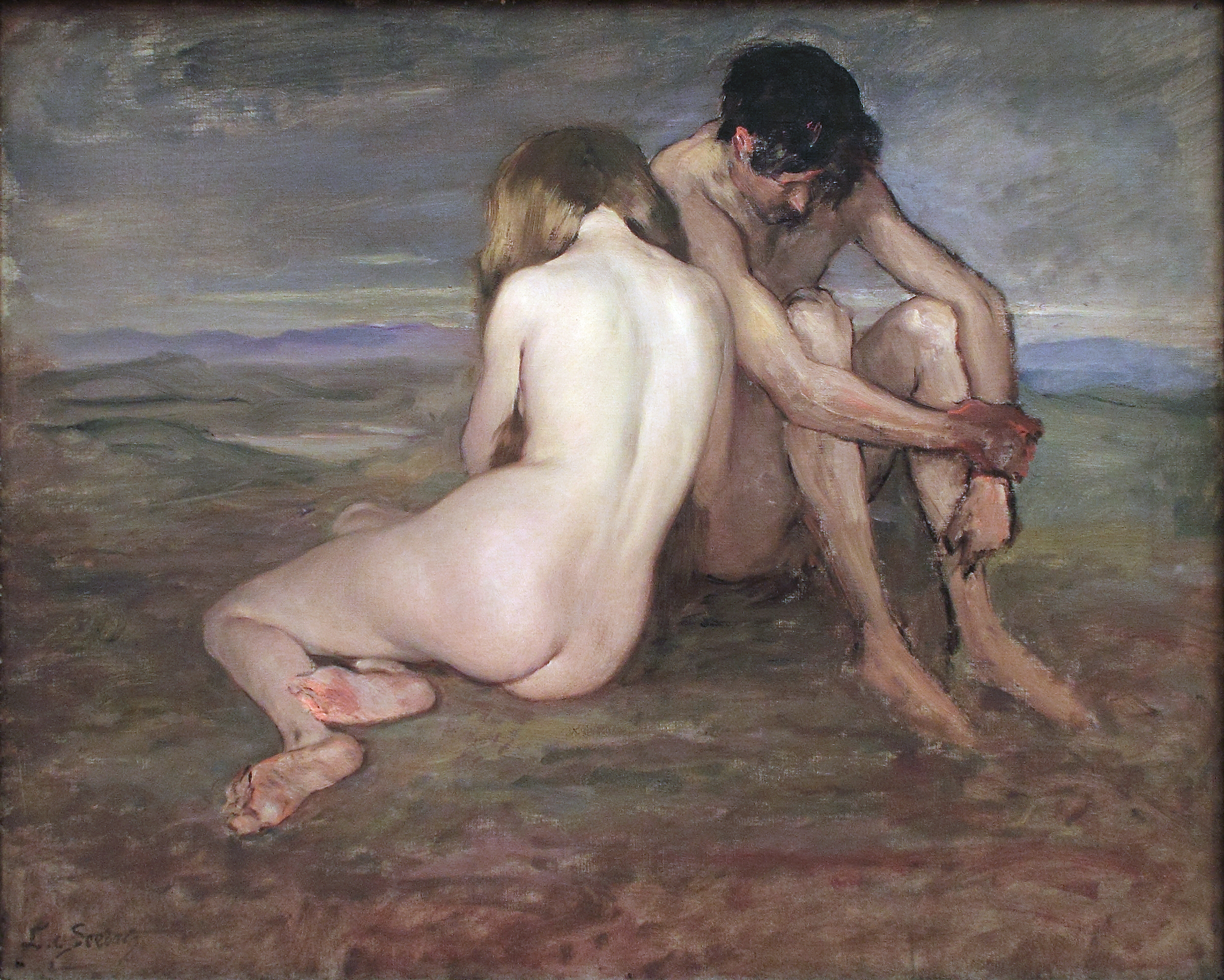
Adam and Eve (c. 1910)

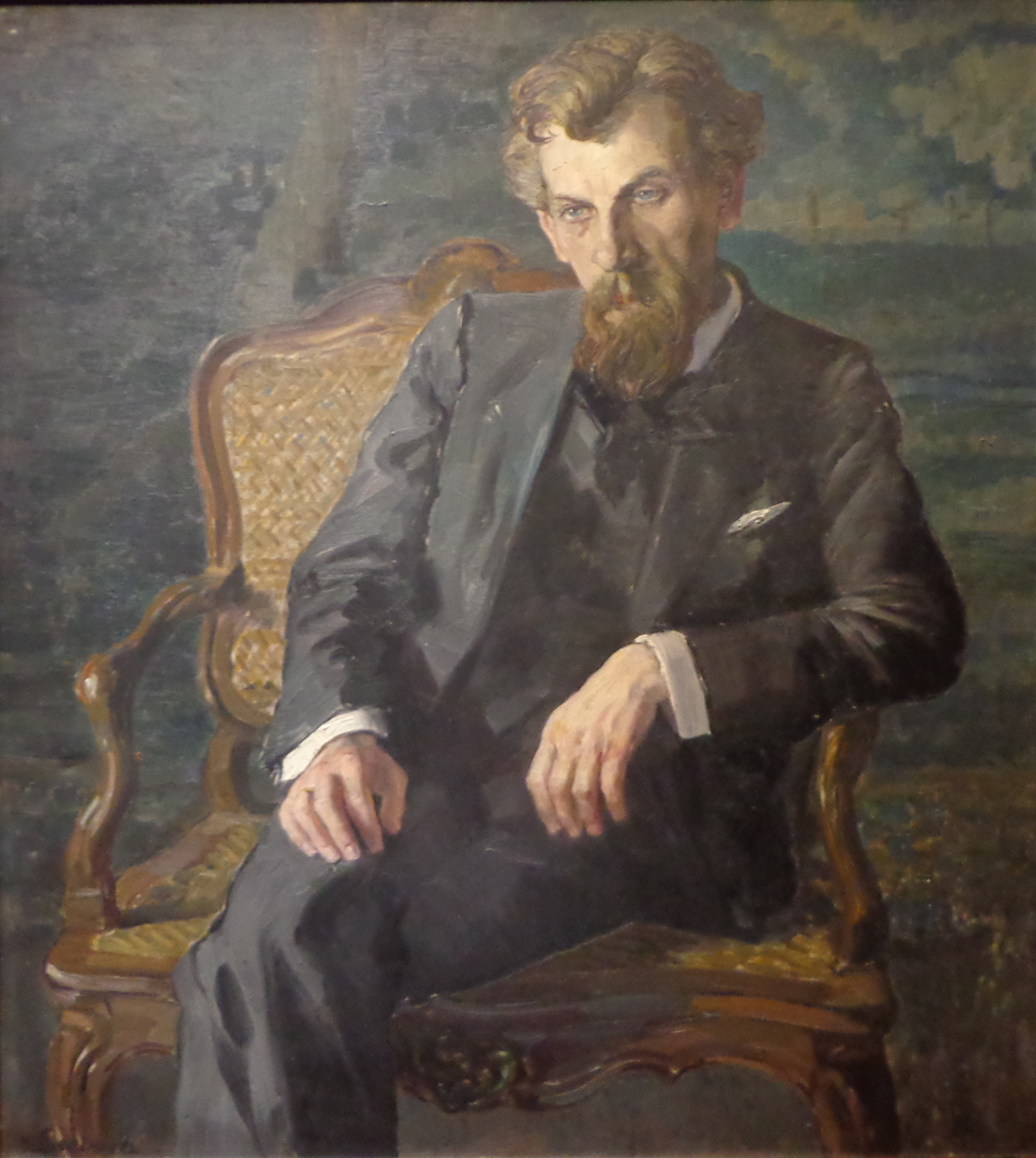
Portrait of Hans Pfitzner (1910)

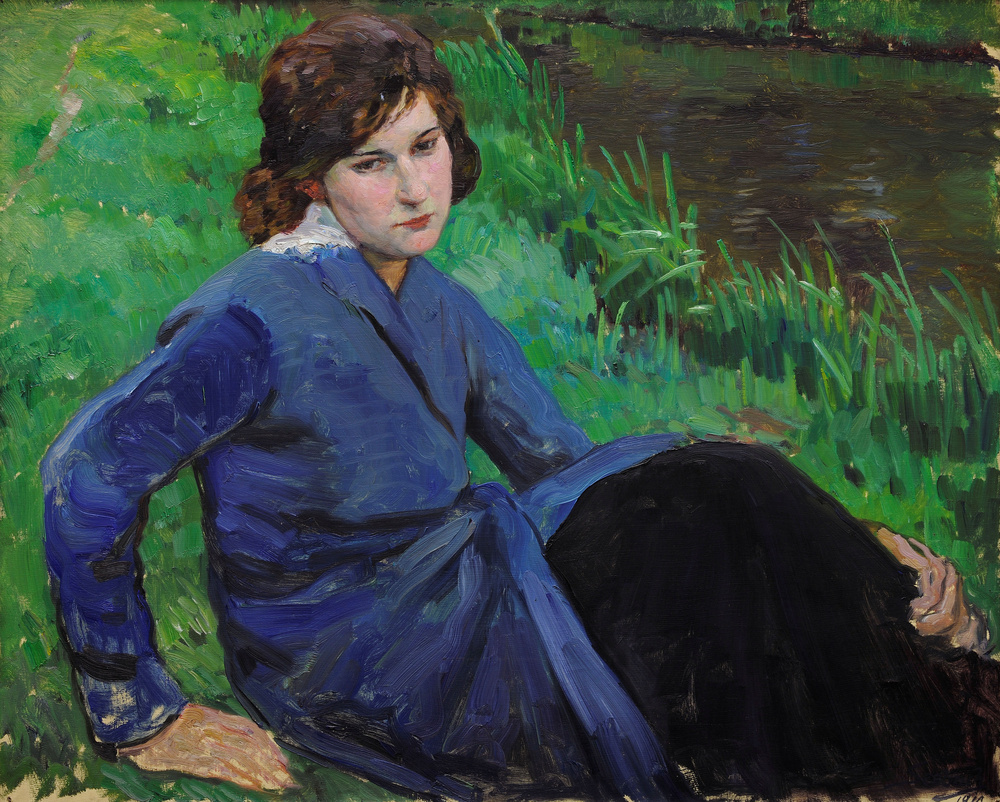
Young woman by a river (1920)
