= Léo Schnug =

German painter (1878 - 1933)

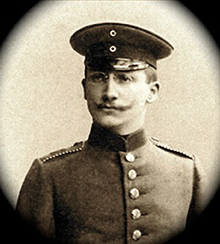
Sgt. Léo Schnug (1914)

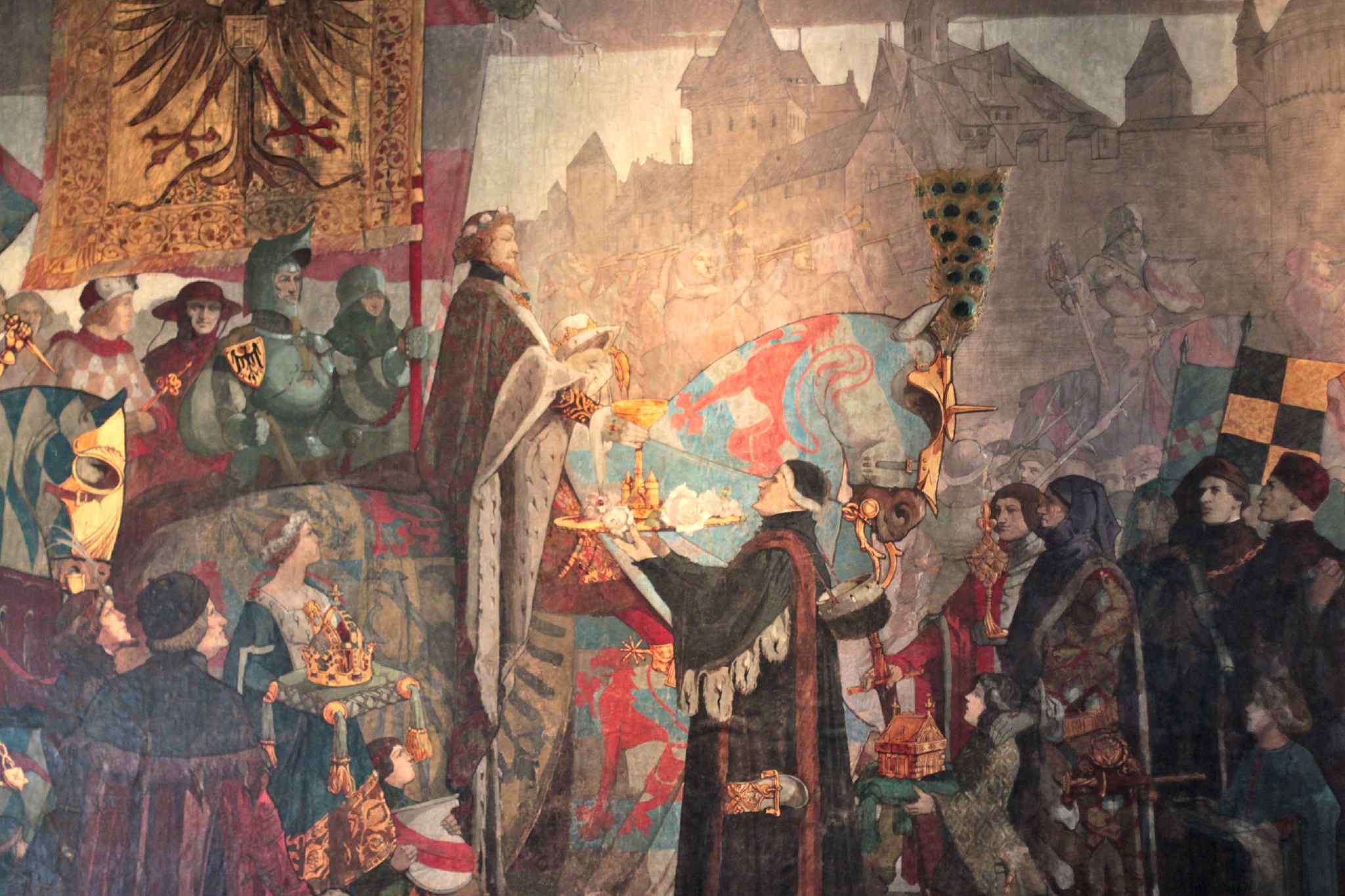
Solemn Entry of Emperor Sigismund in Strasbourg in 1414, detail of a 1904 painting by Léo Schnug. Height 3.45 m (11.3 ft), width 8.37 m (27.5 ft). Musée historique de Strasbourg

Léo Schnug (17 February 1878, Strasbourg - 15 December 1933, near Brumath) was an Alsatian painter and illustrator of German ancestry.

== Biography ==
When he was still very young, his father, a court clerk, was hospitalized for a mental illness. To survive, his mother rented out rooms in their house to performers from the municipal theater, and the opera costumes they brought with them became a source of inspiration.

After a few years at the School of Decorative Arts in Strasbourg, Anton Seder, one of his teachers, obtained work for him providing illustrations to Gerlach & Schenk, a Viennese publishing company. He was only seventeen at the time. His studies continued at the Academy of Fine Arts, München, where he studied under Nikolaos Gyzis.

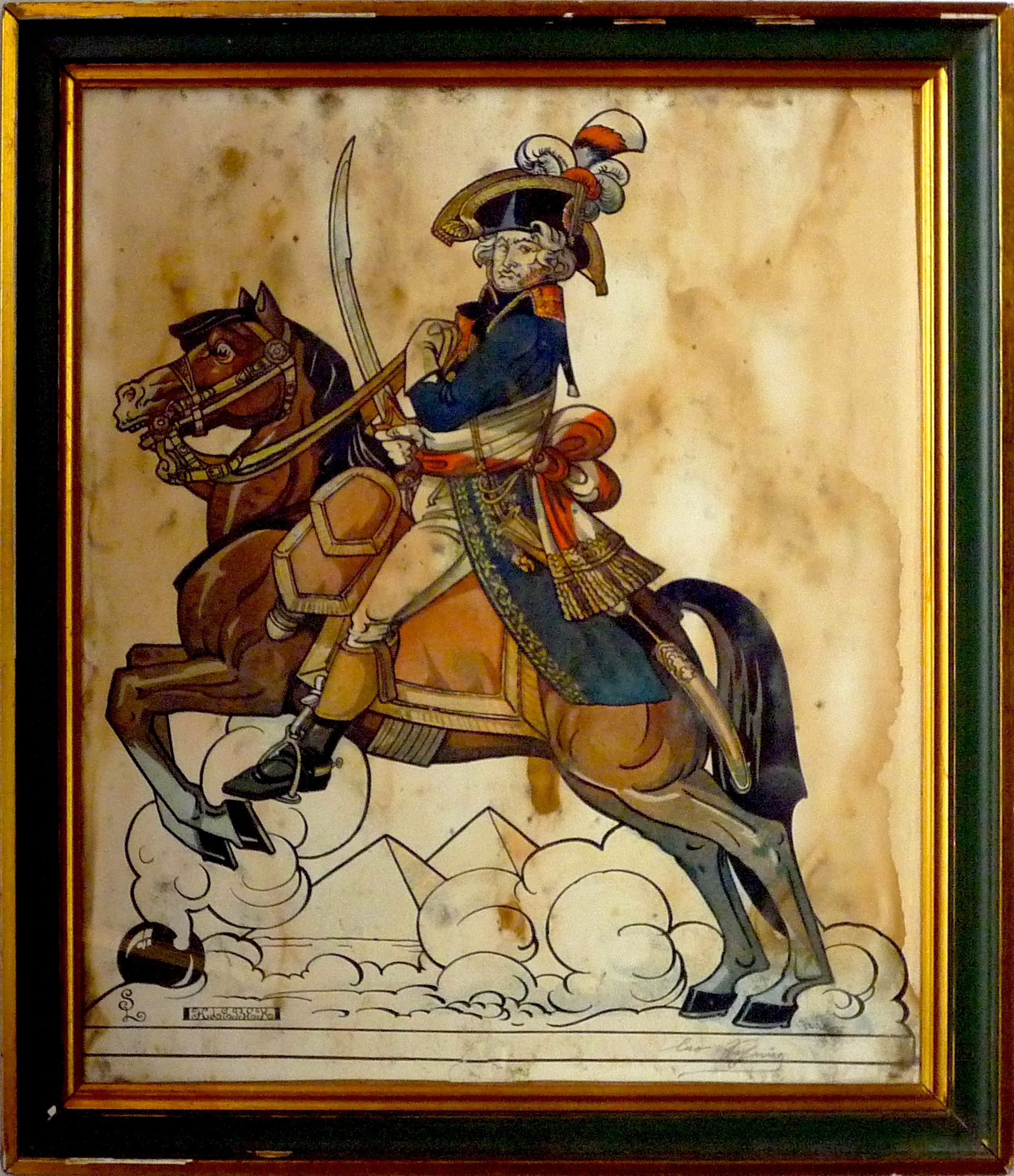
Jean-Baptiste Kléber (1908)

He later moved back to Strasbourg and became a member of the Cercle de Saint-Léonard, where he learned marquetry from Charles Spindler and worked with a coterie of Alsatian artists, including Léon Hornecker, Henri Loux, Alfred Marzolff, Georges Ritleng, Joseph Sattler, Lothar von Seebach and Émile Schneider. He was heavily influenced by Art Nouveau and Medieval themes.

=== Alcoholism ===
At the outbreak of World War I, he enlisted as a sergeant in the German Army. His excessive drinking brought several reprimands. He was due for more severe punishment, but was saved by the intervention of Wilhelm II, who had honored him with the Order of the Red Eagle for his work on the restoration of the Château du Haut-Kœnigsbourg. Eventually, he began paying his bills at the local taverns by drawing small sketches on the tables.

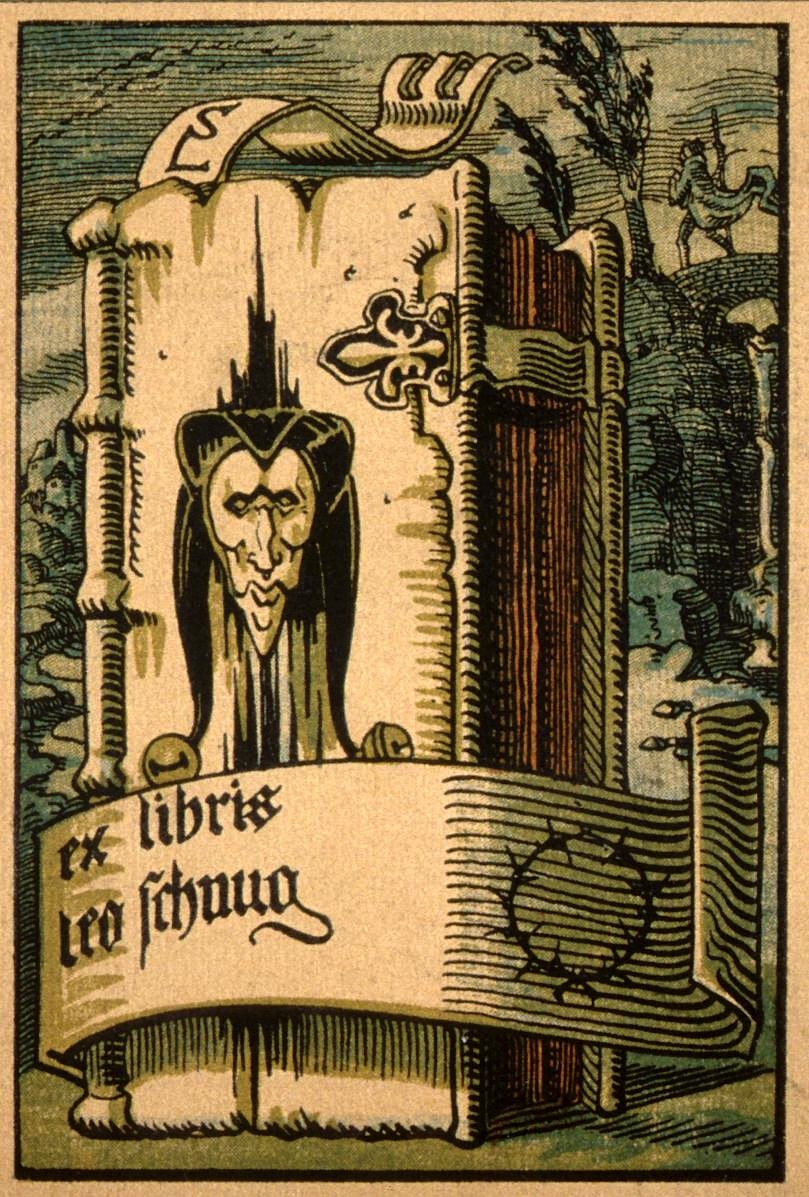
Bookplate, c.1900

His health began to decline rapidly after the war. From 1918 to 1919, he voluntarily entered "Stephansfeld" (the psychiatric hospital where his father was) for rehabilitation. When his father died in 1919, his crisis worsened. Then, when his mother died in 1921, he spent a short time at the Hospices Civil de Strasbourg but suffered a complete breakdown in 1924 and was involuntarily committed to Stephansfeld. He remained there until his death in 1933.

In addition to his regular art work, he also designed costumes, sets and various appurtenances for several public events. A street in Lampertheim (where he grew up) was named in his honor and a portrait of him is in the staircase of the Town Hall.
