= Anselme Laugel =

French-Alsatian author and politician

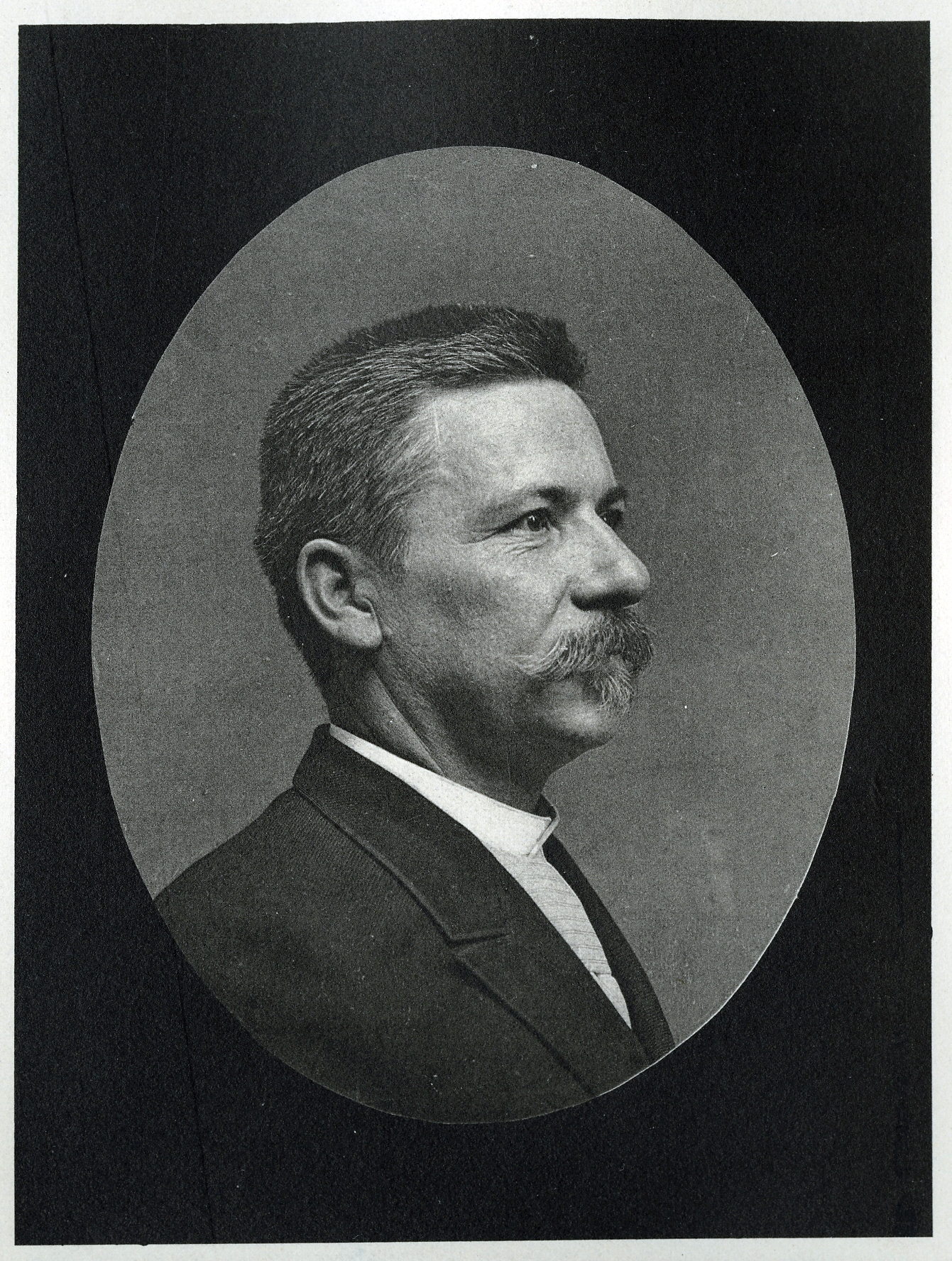
Anselme Laugel (before 1900)

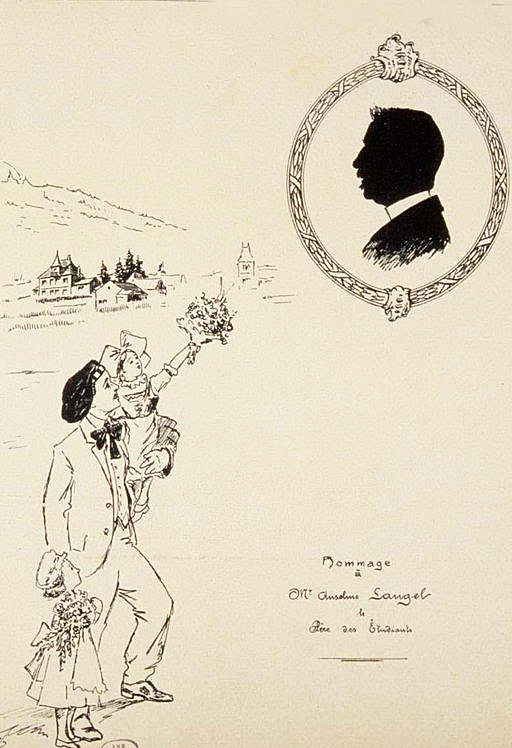
Hommage à Mr Anselme Laugel le Père des Etudiants (1913)

Marie Anselme Victor Henri Laugel (3 April 1851, Strasbourg - 29 July 1928, Bœrsch) was a French-Alsatian author and politician.

== Biography ==
His father, François Joseph Victor Laugel (1817-1885), a locksmith, served on the Strasbourg City Council, as did his grandfather, François Antoine Laugel (1779-1848), who was also a locksmith. After attending a lycée in his hometown, and the Jesuit College in Metz, he took his degree in 1870. That same year, he served with the "Légions d'Alsace-Lorraine" in Lyon, during the Franco-Prussian War.

After the annexation of Alsace-Lorraine in 1871, he left to study in Paris. Later, he worked for the Secretariat of the French Senate. In 1891, he returned home and became Chairman of the Agricultural Council in the district of Kreis Molsheim, then founding President of the Wine Growers' Association of Alsace. In 1896 he was elected to the District Parliament (Bezirkstag), representing Oberelsaß (Upper Alsace). From 1890 to 1911, he was a member of the Regional Committee of the Landtag d'Alsace-Lorraine. In 1897, he married Marie Hervé (1861-1948), daughter of the district tax collector. They had no children.

In addition to his political activities, he was a devoted amateur artist. In 1898, together with his friend, the Alsatian patriot, Pierre Bucher, and the artist, Charles Spindler, he became involved in publishing a magazine, the Revue Alsacienne illustrée, which was issued until 1914. He provided numerous articles on the arts and culture of Alsace, and wrote several books on the subject. He and Spindler also created the "Cercle de Saint-Léonard", an artists' association, whose members included Léon Hornecker, Alfred Marzolff, Joseph Sattler, Léo Schnug, Lothar von Seebach and Gustave Stoskopf.

At the outbreak of World War I, he sided with France and was condemned as a traitor by the Germans. After the war, the French government made him responsible for monitoring the holdings at museums and libraries throughout Alsace. One of his first actions was to remove German-speaking staff from those institutions. He also served on the Commission de Triage, established to determine who should be expelled from France and who should be punished as collaborators. In 1919, he was named a Knight in the Legion of Honor.
