= Émile Schneider =

Émile Schneider may refer to:

- Émile Schneider (painter) (1873–1947), French-Alsatian painter and art teacher
- Émile Schneider (actor) (born 1989), Canadian film and television actor
