= Francis Schlatter =

Alsatian cobbler and supposed healer

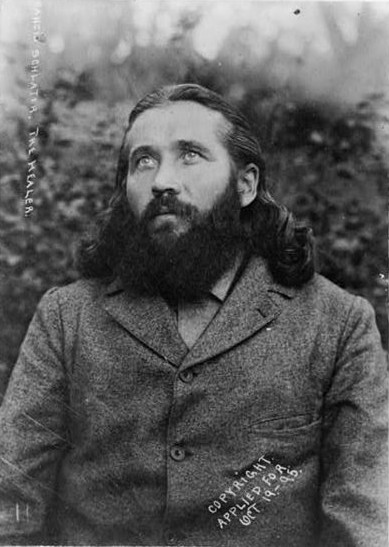
Francis Schlatter

Francis Schlatter (1856–c. 1896) was an Alsatian cobbler who, because of miraculous cures attributed to him, became known as the Healer.

== Biography ==
Schlatter was born in the village of Ebersheim, Bas-Rhin, near Sélestat, in Alsace, France, on April 29, 1856. In 1884 he emigrated to the United States, where he worked at his trade in various cities, arriving in Denver, Colorado, in 1892. There, a few months later, he experienced a vision at his cobbler's bench in which he heard the voice of the Father commanding him to sell his business, give the money to the poor, and devote his life to healing the sick. He then undertook a two-year, 3,000-mile walking pilgrimage around the American West which took him across eastern Colorado, Kansas, and Oklahoma, and then to Hot Springs, Arkansas, where he was arrested and jailed for vagrancy. In early 1894 he escaped and headed west, walking across Texas, New Mexico, and Arizona and into southern California, where he began his first efforts at healing with the indigenous people of the San Jacinto Valley. After two months, he again took up his pilgrimage and traveled east across the Mojave Desert, living on nothing but flour and water. In July 1895 he emerged as a Christlike healer in the Rio Grande villages south of Albuquerque. There, while treating hundreds of sick, suffering, and disabled people who flocked to Albuquerque's Old Town, he became famous. Crowds gathered about him daily, hoping to be cured of their diseases simply by clasping his hands. The following month he returned to Denver, but did not resume his healings until mid-September. During the next few weeks, his ministry drew tens of thousands of pilgrims to a small home in North Denver. Schlatter is said to have refused all rewards for his services. His manner of living was of the simplest, and he taught no new doctrine. He said only that he obeyed a power which he called Father, and from this power he received his healing virtue.

On the night of November 13, 1895, he suddenly disappeared, leaving behind him a note in which he said that his mission was ended. Then, in 1897 news came out of Mexico that the healer's skeleton and possessions had been found on a mountainside in the Sierra Madre. According to its supposed discoverers, the skeleton was completely intact and standing upright, which has struck a recent biographer as extremely unlikely.

At the same time, a New Mexico woman named Ada Morley published a book called The Life of the Harp in the Hand of the Harper which told of the healer's three-month retreat on her ranch in Datil, New Mexico, after his disappearance from Denver. The book, which carried the title the healer gave it, also contained a first-person description of his two-year pilgrimage, which he believed held the same significance for mankind as Christ's forty days in the wilderness. On departing the Morley ranch, Schlatter told Morley that God intended to establish New Jerusalem in the Datil Mountains, and the healer promised to return by 1899.

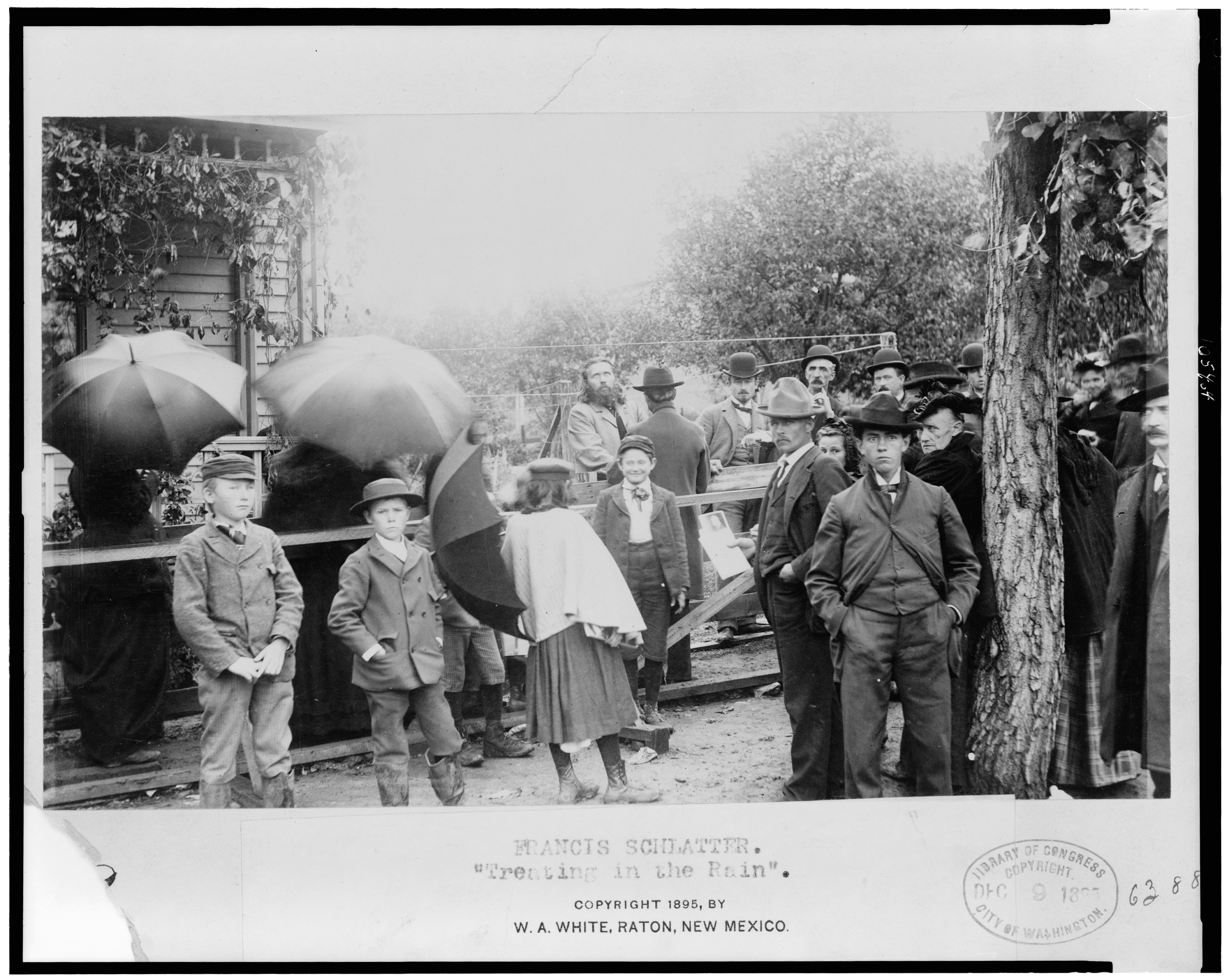
Schlatter standing in center, healing man as other people wait in line or observe from sidelines. 1895

In August Strindberg's autobiographical novel Inferno Francis Schlatter is mentioned as a doppelgänger of another man Strindberg met in Paris in 1896, the year after Schlatter disappeared. He was afraid of Schlatter. The "double" turned out to be Paul Herrmann, a German-American painter.

== The Healer's Copper Rod ==
While staying in Colorado, Schlatter had a copper rod made for him. He used it occasionally as a walking stick, but never disclosed the reason for making it.

In 1906 Edgar Lee Hewett, who became a noted archaeologist and museum director, was conducting research near Casas Grandes, Chihuahua, Mexico, when his Mexican guide pointed out an unmarked grave. Ten years before, the guide said, he had come across the body of a dead man following a blizzard. From the guide's description, Hewett surmised that the dead man the guide had come across was Francis Schlatter, whom Hewett had met and whose healing sessions he observed in 1895. Hewett asked if any of the man's possessions had survived. The guide led him to the home of the jefe of Casas Grandes, and there Hewett saw Schlatter's Bible, saddle, and copper rod—which had become a mysterious hallmark of the healer from the time of his disappearance. Years later, in 1922, Hewett returned to Mexico and examined the copper rod again. By now the director of the School of American Research (now the School for Advanced Research) and the Museum of New Mexico, he showed interest in the rod and made a donation to the village of Casas Grandes to hire a teacher. Back in Santa Fe, a few weeks later, he received a heavy, burlap-wrapped package, and inside was Francis Schlatter's copper rod. He placed the rod in the collections of the two institutions he directed, which shared space in the Palace of the Governors in Santa Fe, N.M. Today the rod lies in the collections of the New Mexico History Museum in the Palace of the Governors. It was displayed once, in 2009.

== Death and Imposters ==
Almost immediately after reports came out of Mexico announcing the healer's death, skepticism arose. Ada Morley, who had visited at length with Schlatter during his three-month stay at her ranch in New Mexico in early 1896, had her doubts. "The men who found the skeleton declared to have been [Schlatter's]," she said, "say it was resting as though it had never been disturbed. I know the coyotes would never have left it so if it had ever lain there bearing flesh." The New York Times expressed doubts as well. "It does not appear that the human remains were actually identified as Schlatter's," the newspaper stated on June 19, 1897, "or that any identification was possible." However, the presence of the healer's possessions at the scene, especially his copper rod, convinced most people otherwise.

Over the next twenty-five years, several men arose claiming to be Francis Schlatter. One, a Presbyterian minister named Charles McLean, died in Hastings, Nebraska, in 1909, creating a controversy between skeptics and believers. Two others, August Schrader and Jacob Kunze, who formed a healing team that operated between 1908 and 1917, were arrested and jailed in 1916 for mail fraud. A final so-called imposter died in St. Louis, Missouri, in October 1922.

During the second half of the twentieth century, a renewed interest in Schlatter brought with it speculation about the claim of the healer who had died in St. Louis. Most recently, The Vanishing Messiah: The Life and Resurrections of Francis Schlatter (2016) argues that the healer conspired to stage his death in the mountains of Mexico and returned to the United States to continue healing in the eastern and southern parts of the country until his death in St. Louis in 1922, this time taking payment, abusing alcohol, and sometimes using the name John E. Martin. Weztel theorizes that Schlatter was aware his prophecies had failed and therefore took on the persona of a Schlatter impersonator. Wetzel's claim rests in part on a largely forgotten autobiography entitled Modern Miracles of Healing: A True Account of the Life, Works and Wanderings of Francis Schlatter, the Healer (1903). Weztel argues that Schlatter wrote this book in order to convince his Denver friends that he was an imposter, while convincing non-Denver readers that he was the real Schlatter.

Based on police photos, four forensic experts concluded that "John E. Martin" was not Schlatter, while one forensic expert sided with Wetzel. "Martin" had two physical markings that resembled Schlatter, and both had large hands. "Martin" continued to use Schlatter's identity even when it got him into serious legal trouble; he insisted throughout his life that (like Schlatter) he was an illegal immigrant, and because of this he was almost deported to France by both Canadian and American border officials.
