= Yves Tenret =

Belgian writer and journalist (1948–2026)

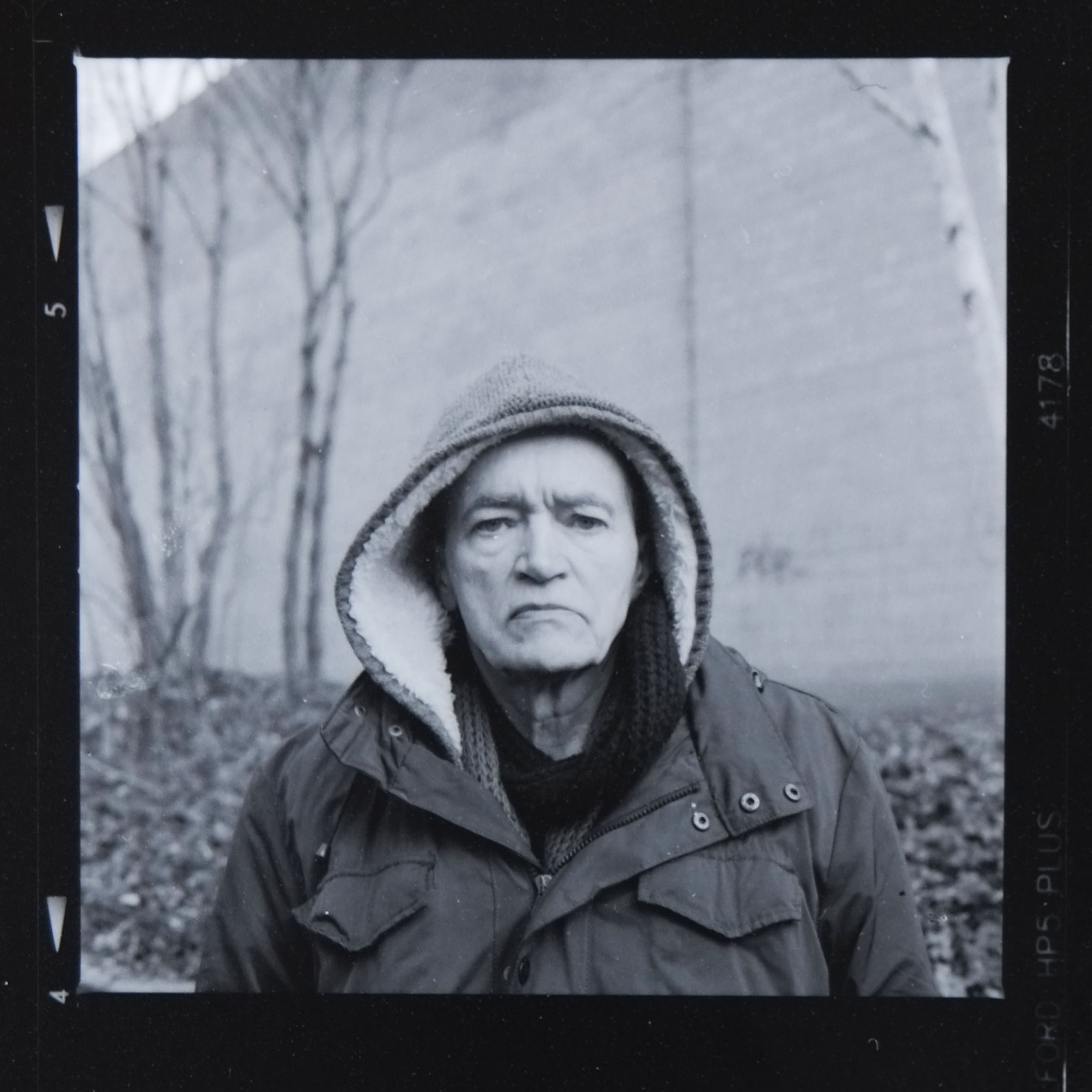
- Tenret in 2013
- Born: 26 July 1948; Brussels, Belgium
- Died: 12 April 2026 (aged 77); Paris, France
- Education: School for Advanced Studies in the Social Sciences
- Occupations: Writer; Journalist

Yves Tenret (26 July 1948 – 12 April 2026) was a Belgian writer and journalist.

== Biography ==
Born in Brussels on 26 July 1948, Tenret studied at the School for Advanced Studies in the Social Sciences in Paris. In 1973, he self-published his first book, Un été. In 1990, he was hired as a professor for the Haute école des arts du Rhin. He was known for his work Comment j’ai tué la Troisième internationale situationniste, published in 2004. Teaching at the École supérieure d'art de Mulhouse in his later career, he also hosted the radio show La vie est un roman on Aligre FM.

Yves Tenret died in Paris on 12 April 2026, at the age of 77.

== Works ==
- Un été (1973)
- Une vie d'artiste, canton de Vaud, 1967-1978 (1979)
- Un milliard de projets (1985)
- Le Poireau (1994)
- Humour - une biographie de James Joyce (2001)
- Comment j’ai tué la troisième internationale situationniste (2004)
- Maman (2007)
- Portrait de l’artiste en révolté (2009)
- Faire impression – L’école d’art à Mulhouse entre industrie et beaux-arts (1829-2009) (2011)
- Bound for Glory (2012)
- Funky Boy (2012)
- Fourt (2014)
- Faire dépression (2015)
- Coup de chaud à la Butte-aux-Cailles (2015)
- Coup fourré rue des Frigos (2016)
- Mon AVC (2017)
- L’année de tous les baisers (2019)
