= René Beeh =

German painter (1886–1922)

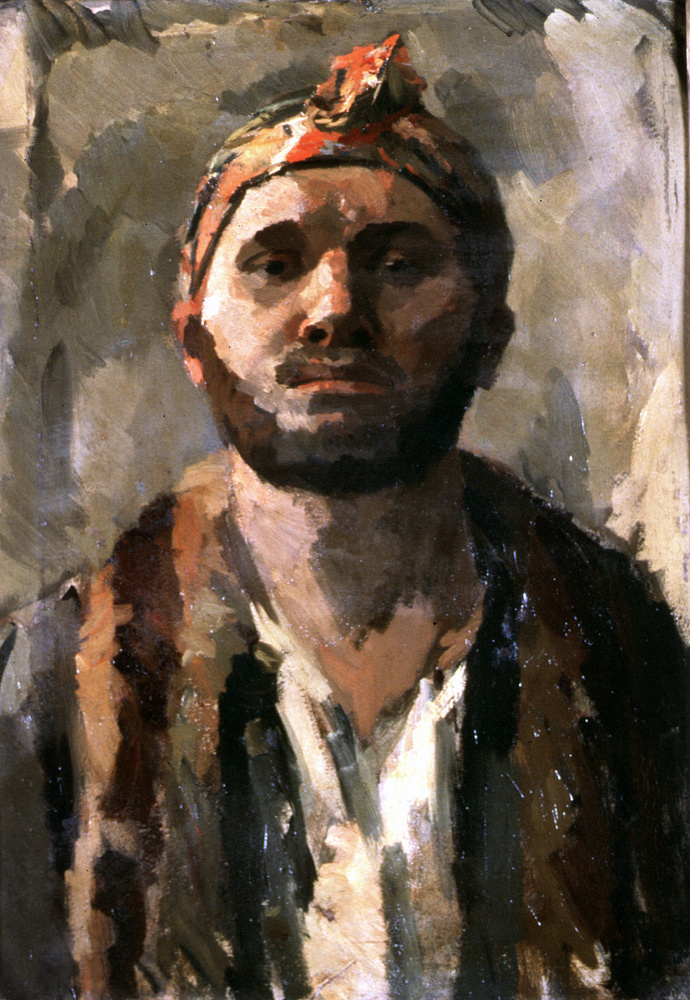
- Self-portrait with a turban (around 1912)
- Born: January 1886; Strasbourg, Alsace-Lorraine
- Died: 23 January 1922 (aged 35–36); Strasbourg, France
- Known for: Paintings and drawings
- Style: Expressionism

René Beeh (German: [ˈʁɛne be:], January 1886 − 23 January 1922) was a German draughtsman and painter from Alsace. He was held in high esteem by his contemporaries and called "the coming genius" (das kommende Genie) by art historian Wilhelm Hausenstein, but with his having died prematurely, he has been mostly forgotten.

== Life and work ==
Beeh was taught in the Fine Arts School in Strasbourg from 1900 until 1905, then in the Academy of Fine Arts in Munich (student number 2936, registered on 9 May 1905), where his teachers were Peter Halm, Hugo von Habermann and Franz von Stuck. In 1910, he travelled to French Algeria where he stayed until 1911, before journeying through Italy and Provence. In 1914, he published a selection of letters from Algeria along with sixty drawings, under the title M'Barka. Malerbriefe aus Algerien mit sechzig Zeichnungen.

During the First World War, Beeh was drafted as a surveyor for the Imperial German Army on the Western Front in Belgium (on the Ypres Salient) and Northern France. Some of his War drawings were published in the Munich review Zeit-Echo. After the War, Beeh, suffering from depression, is thought to have destroyed much of his own work. He died from a severe case of seasonal flu at the age of 36.

Beeh was a member of the Neue Münchner Secession (New Munich Secession). He was also friends with several members of the Strasbourg group of painters Groupe de Mai.

In 1914, Beeh illustrated a book celebrating the centenary of Gottfried Keller, and in 1919−1920, the novel Inferno by August Strindberg. He also illustrated a 1918 edition of Jeremias Gotthelf's The Black Spider, and he contributed to the periodical Münchner Blätter für Dichtung und Graphik ("Munich Journal for Poetry and Graphics") alongside Paul Klee, Heinrich Campendonk and Alfred Kubin.

=== La Révolution ===
The artist's most ambitious surviving work is the large painting La Révolution ("The Revolution") (oil on canvas, 120.5 cm (47.4 in) x 156.5 cm (61.6 in), painted 1918–1919), an ominous depiction of the events of November 1918 in Strasbourg using solely tints and shades of ochre and brown. The painting shows a small group of men seen from very close who are grabbing rifles and seem ready to launch an assault; but instead of rushing forward towards the viewer, they are gazing at a figure in workwear, who sits motionless with an inscrutable expression. The action seems frozen and time appears suspended in the very moment where violence is breaking out.

== Posterity ==
In 2008, the Musée historique in Haguenau organised an exhibition of his works, the first in France since his premature death, 86 years before. The Musée d'art moderne et contemporain of Strasbourg owns 100 works (as of 5 April 2024) by Beeh: 54 prints, 36 drawings and 10 paintings, among which two self-portraits, a portrait of the artist's father and of the artist's sister, and La Révolution. The Los Angeles County Museum of Art currently owns 83 works by the artist, drawings and prints, and the Museum of Modern Art currently owns 27 works, also drawings and prints.

== Gallery ==
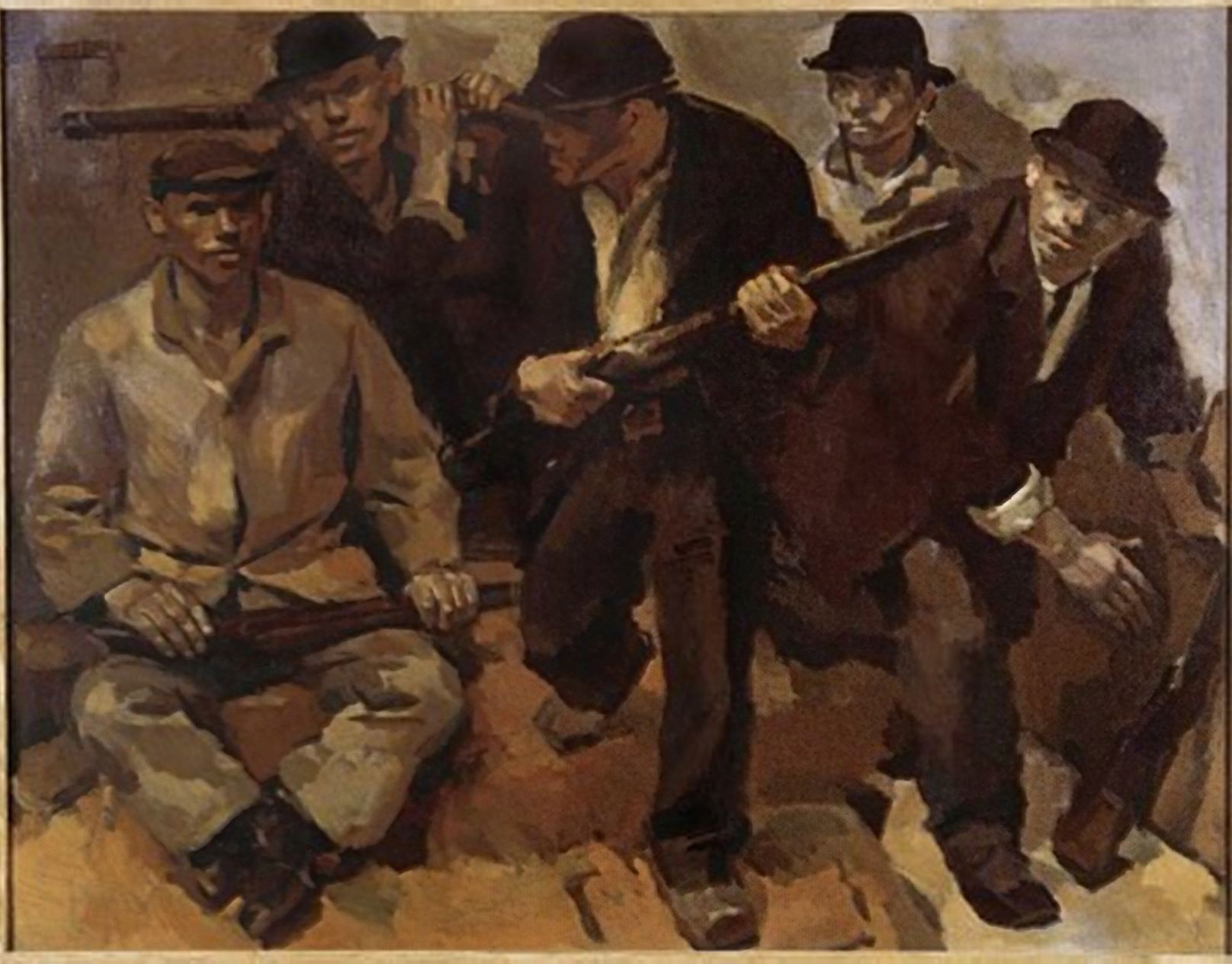
The Revolution (1918–1919)

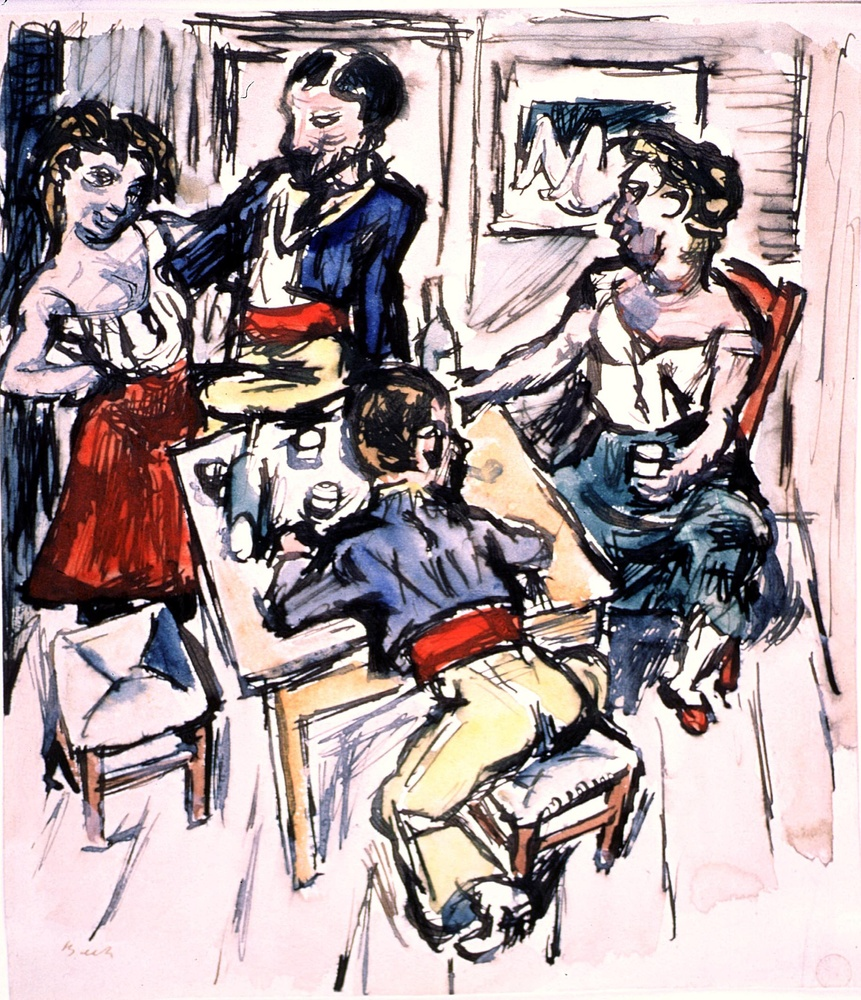
Brothel scene in Algeria (1915)

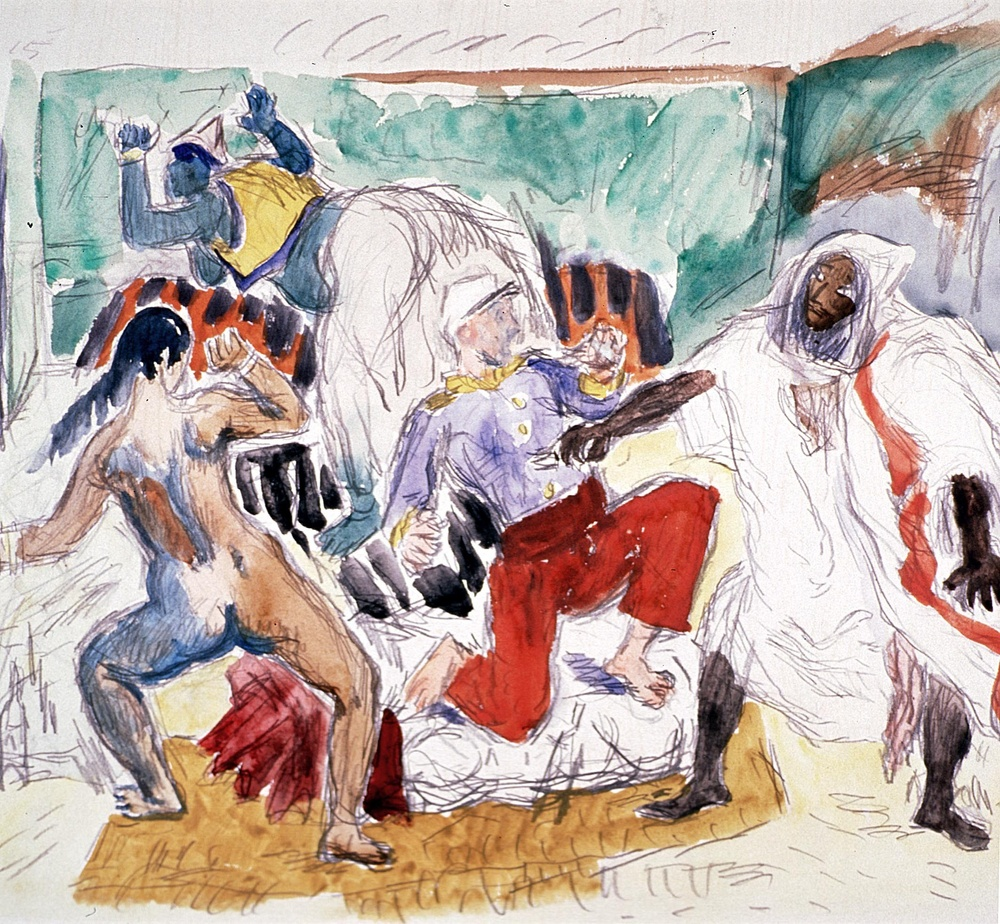
French Legionnaire being stabbed by an Algerian (1915)

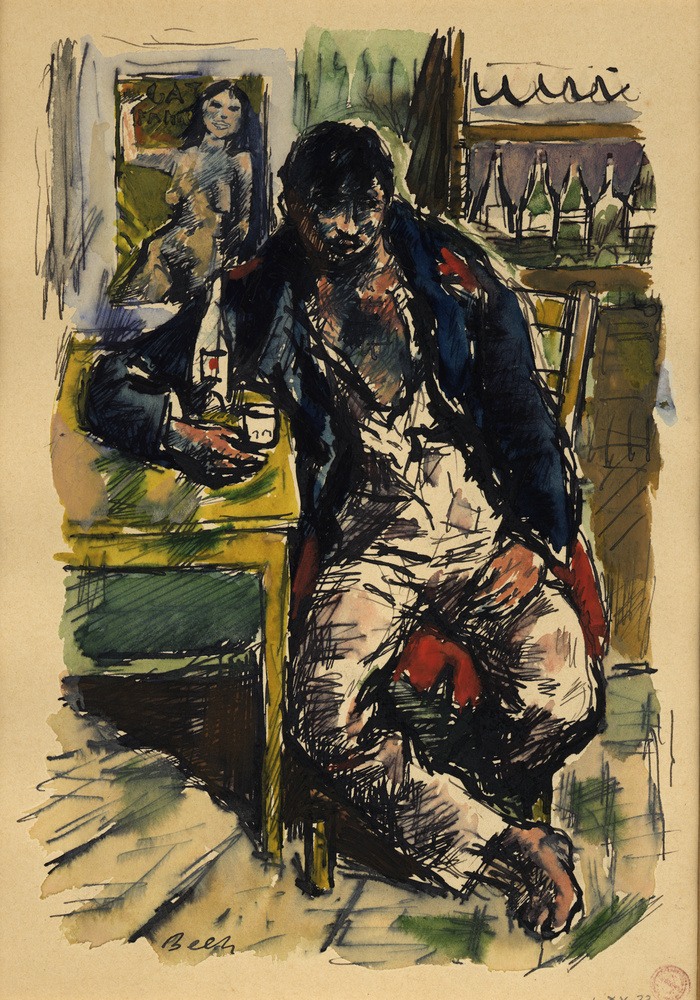
Man sitting in a bar (before 1922)

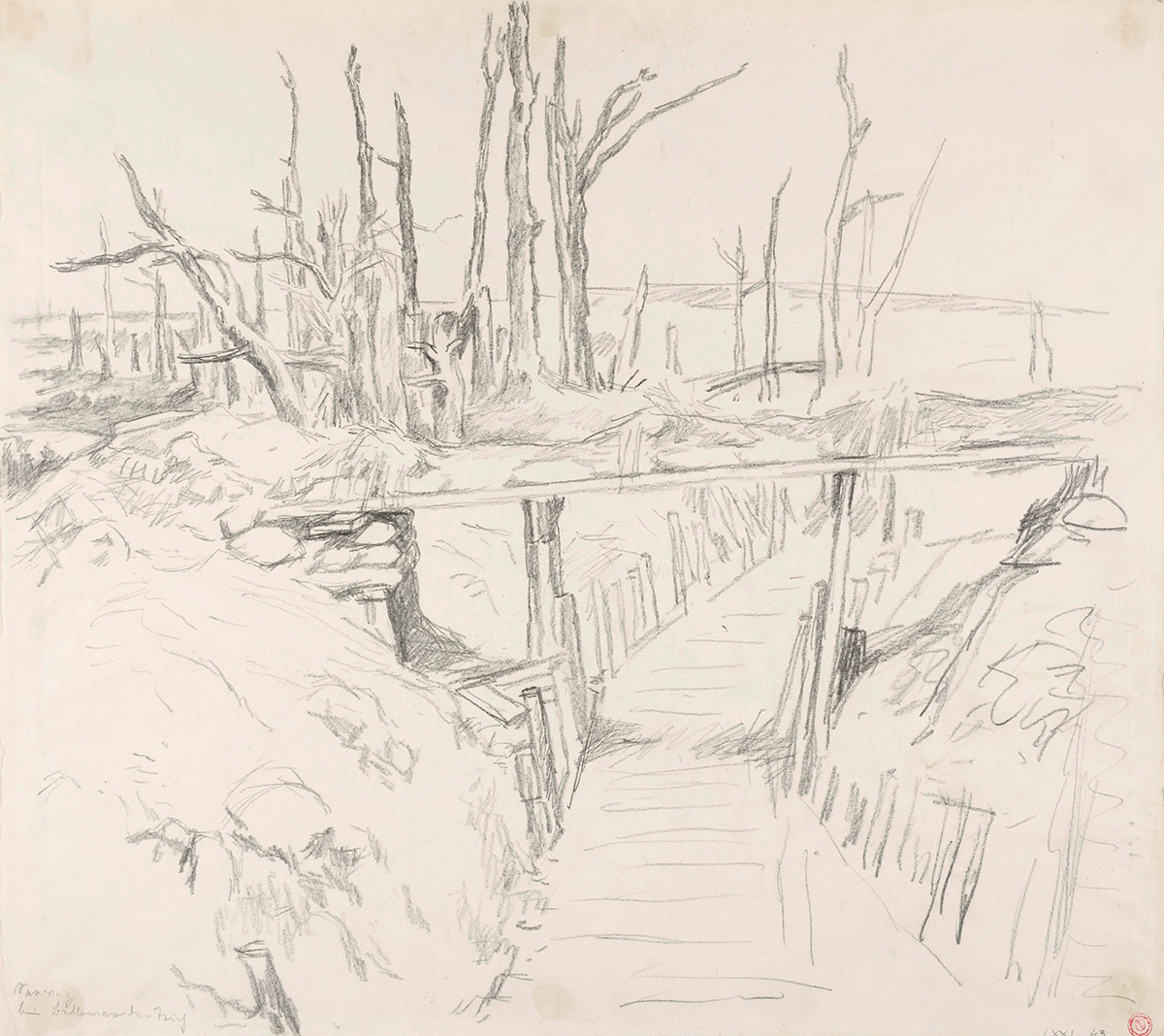
Trench (between 1915 and 1918)

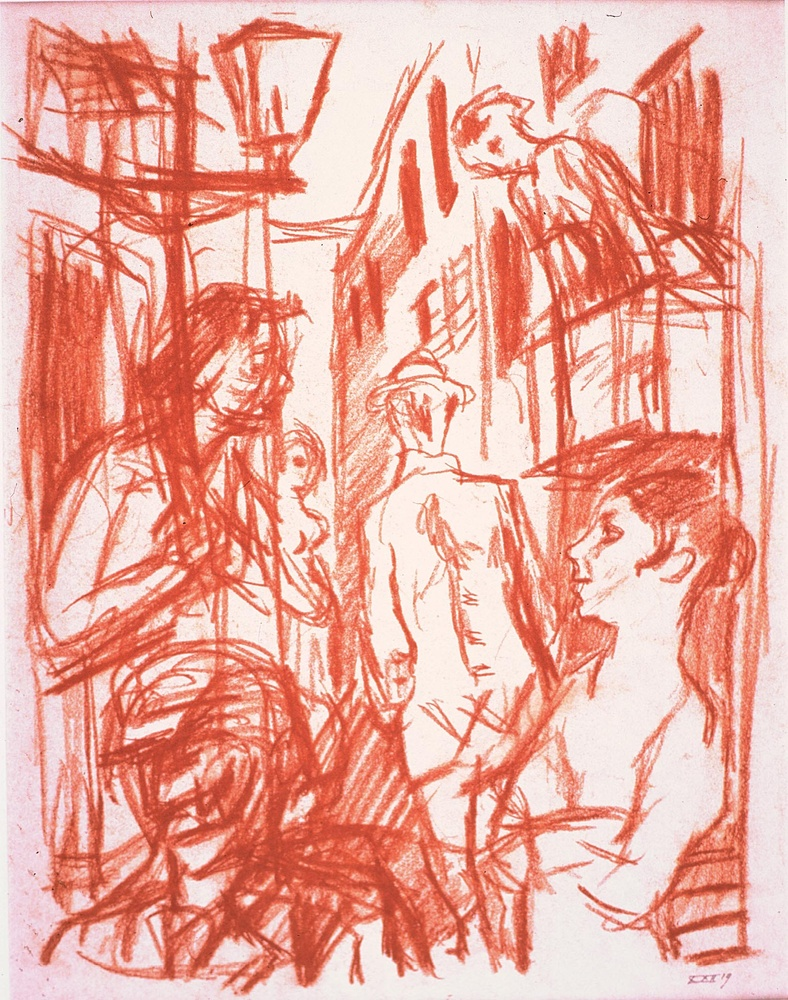
Dead End (project for Inferno by Strindberg, 1919)
