= Inferno (Strindberg novel) =

Autobiographical novel by August Strindberg

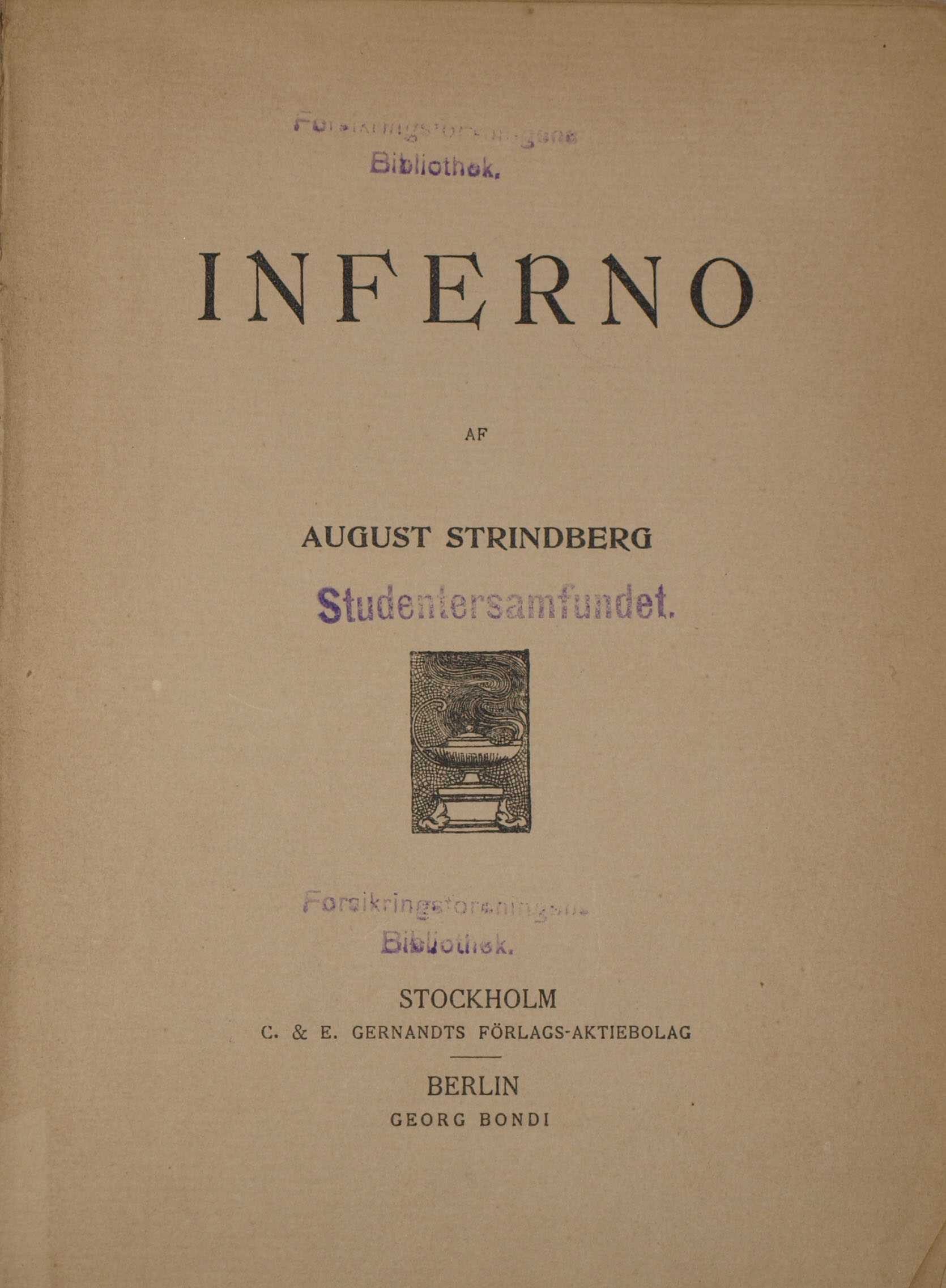
- The title page of the first edition of August Strindbergs Inferno from 1897
- Author: August Strindberg
- Translators: Claud Field; Mary Sandbach
- Language: French
- Genre: Autobiographical novel
- Publication date: 1898
- Publication place: Sweden
- English publication date: 1912

Inferno is an autobiographical novel by August Strindberg. Written in French in 1896–97 at the height of Strindberg's troubles with both censors and women, the book is concerned with Strindberg's life both in and after he lived in Paris, and explores his various obsessions, including alchemy, occultism, and Swedenborgianism, and shows signs of paranoia and neuroticism.

Inferno has often been cited as proof of Strindberg's own personal neuroses, such as a persecution complex, but evidence also suggests that Strindberg, although experiencing mild neurotic symptoms, both invented and exaggerated much of the material in the book for dramatic effect.

== Plot ==
The narrator (ostensibly Strindberg, although his narrative variably coheres with and diverges from historical truth) spends most of the novel in Paris, isolated from his wife (Frida Uhl), children, and friends. He associates with a circle of Parisian artists and writers (including Paul Gauguin and Edvard Munch), but often fears they are ridiculing and persecuting him. In his isolation, Strindberg successfully attempts alchemical experiments that apparently violate the laws of chemistry, and has his work published in prominent journals. He fears, however, that his secrets will be stolen, and his persecution mania worsens, believing that his enemies are attacking him with 'infernal machines.' He also dabbles in the occult, at one point casting a black magic spell on his own distanced daughter.

Throughout his studies and adventures, Strindberg believes himself guided by mysterious forces (attributing them sometimes to God, Fate, or vaguer origins). When returning to Austria to see his daughter, who lives with his in-laws, Strindberg is introduced to German mythology and the teachings of Swedenborg. Strindberg's grandmother-in-law shows great disdain towards him and forces him to move back-and-forth between the towns of Saxen (where his daughter lives) and Klam. While staying there, Strindberg once again has paranoid ideas regarding how various world events prove that he is both cursed and possesses magical powers to curse others himself.

In Saxen I pack my things and prepare for departure. I part with sorrow from my child, who has become so dear to me. The cruelty of the old woman, who has succeeded in separating me from wife and child, enrages me. Angrily I shake my fist against a painting of her which hangs over my bed, and utter an imprecation against her. Two hours later a terrible storm breaks over the village.

Strindberg moves to Lund in Sweden, where he reads the original works by Swedenborg (including the Arcana Cœlestia) as well as the works of Sar Peladan. Strindberg combines the teachings of Swedenborgianism with Catholicism, Lutheranism and various world mythologies, and states that Swedenborg's works have predicted various events from his life. Through this newfound imagery, Strindberg sees his life as a living hell, hence the novel's title. He also mentions that he sought "refugee" in a Belgian convent, and expects to receive an answer from them shortly after this book is finished.

Luther believed that all accidents, such as breaking bones, falls, conflagrations, and most illnesses were traceable to the machinations of devils. He also asserted that some individuals have already had their hell upon earth.
Have I not, then, rightly named my book Inferno? If any reader holds it for mere invention, he is invited to inspect my journal, which I have kept daily since 1895, of which this book is only an elaborated and expanded extract.

A translation to English by Claud Field (1863–1941) was published by G. P. Putnam's Sons in 1912.

== Organization ==
The novel is broken up into hundreds of short sections, which are arranged into chapters titled with divine allusions (Purgatory, Inferno). It has been referred to as a collection of prose poetry.

== Translations into English ==
- Claud Field (1912)
- Mary Sandbach (1962)
- Evert Sprinchorn (1968)

== Illustrations ==
In 1919−1920, the novel was illustrated by the German expressionist René Beeh.
