= Léon Hornecker =

French painter (1864 - 1924)

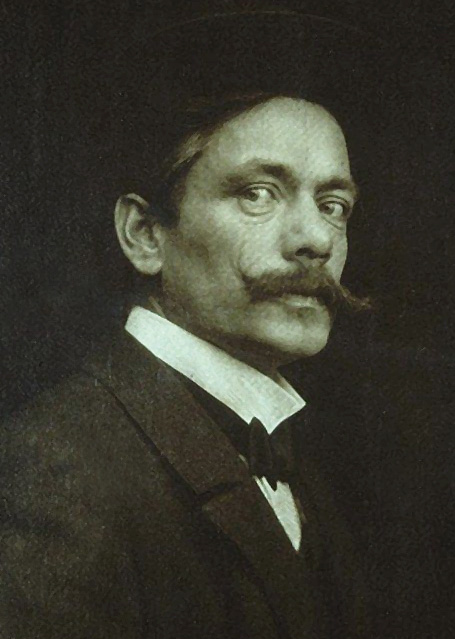
Léon Hornecker (c. 1890)

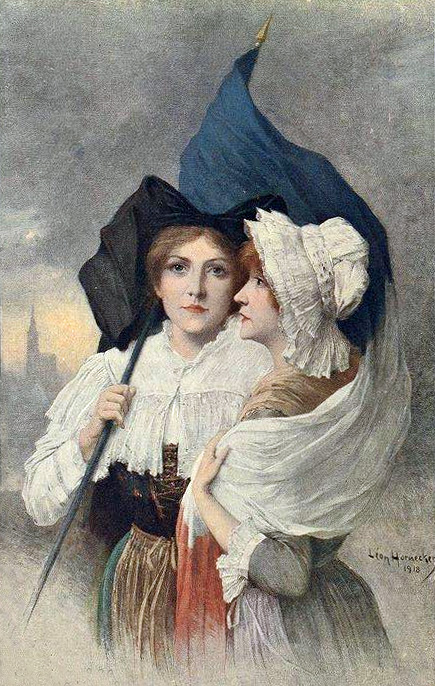
La Patrie retrouvée (The Fatherland recovered, 1919)

Léon Hornecker (13 June 1864, Neuhof - 9 January 1924, Paris) was an Alsatian painter of landscapes and portraits.

== Life and work ==
He showed an aptitude for artistic crafts at an early age and was apprenticed to the Ott Brothers glass-making workshop. At the same time, he attended evening classes in drawing at an arts and crafts school where he impressed his teachers and received a scholarship, beginning his studies at the Academy of Fine Arts, Munich in 1883. He made several study trips to Holland, where he was influenced by the Old Masters, and graduated in 1888, after which he returned to Strasbourg.

In 1889, the City of Strasbourg hired Anton Seder (of the Munich Academy) to be Director of the École supérieure des arts décoratifs de Strasbourg. As a former alumnus from Munich, Hornecker soon found employment there. He taught drawing and anatomy, but derived little pleasure from teaching and was eventually dismissed. From that point on, he turned his attention to France, rather than Germany and became a member of the "Cercle de Saint-Léonard", a group devoted to the promotion of Alsatian culture, founded by Charles Spindler and Anselme Laugel.

By 1894, his commissions had increased to the point where he required a larger workshop and, in 1899, was able to marry. One of his sons, Adrien, became a sculptor of some note.

=== In Paris ===
The increasing political tensions in Alsace eventually led him to leave his home in 1906. At first he stayed with friends then, in 1908, moved to Paris. Unfortunately, his work was considered to be a bit old-fashioned there and he attracted few customers. His longing for Alsace was strong. He decorated his studio to resemble an Alsatian inn and frequented taverns where Alsatians congregated.

During the First World War, he maintained contact with many notable Alsatian refugees. After the war, he returned to Strasbourg, but a new generation of artists had appeared and he was unable to fit back in. He died at home in 1924. A street in the Elsau district of Strasbourg was named after him in 1969.
