= Émile Schneider (painter) =

French painter (1873 - 1947)

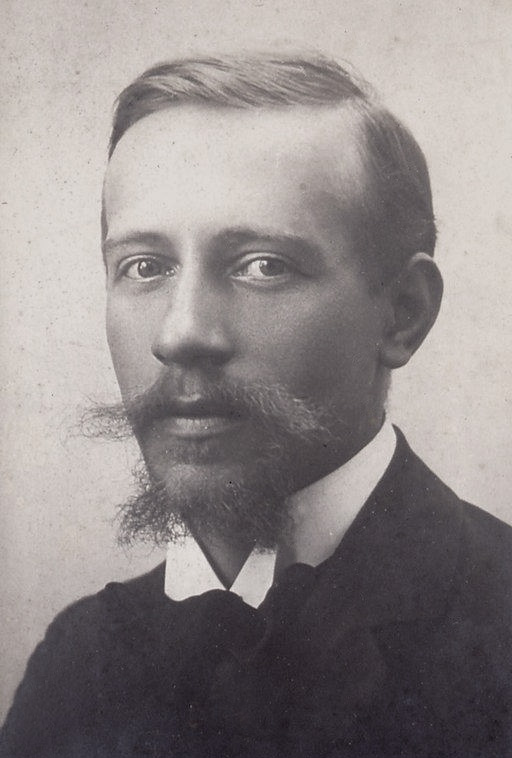
Émile Schneider (1890)

Émile Philippe Auguste Schneider (20 January 1873, Illkirch-Graffenstaden - 16 December 1947, L'Haÿ-les-Roses) was a French painter and designer; best known for his portraits of notable people from Alsace.

== Biography ==
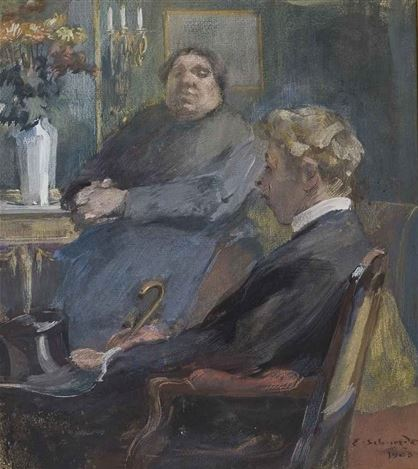
The Waiting Room

He was born to a Protestant family; the son of a railway engineer. After finishing primary school, at the age of twelve, his parents sent him to the lycée in Belfort, as they wanted him to have a French education. He began his artistic studies with the portrait painter, Léon Hornecker then, from 1890 to 1892, attended the École supérieure des arts décoratifs de Strasbourg (Straßburger Kunsthandwerkerschule). During this time, he also worked as an illustrator for an obscure newspaper called D'r Meiselocker; after a medieval nickname for the inhabitants of Strasbourg. He continued his studies at the Academy of Fine Arts, Munich, in the workshop of the Greek artist, Nikolaos Gysis. His first exhibit came in 1894.

When he returned to Strasbourg in 1899, he immediately opened a studio which became the center of an artistic group named after the Rue Saint-Nicholas, where the studio was located. The group was openly oriented toward Paris and the Alsatian artists living there. After 1909, it would become the "Association des Artistes Alsaciens". They held numerous exhibits in Strasbourg, both before and after World War I.

In addition to painting, he worked as a teacher, beginning in 1900 at the "École de dessin et de peinture de Mlle Gross", a private school that was focused on the Parisian art world, but also welcomed the children of German officials. In 1905, he was engaged by his alma mater, the École supérieure, where he was placed in charge of the women's section, taught drawing from life, and organized competitions.

From 1918 to 1920, he served as the school's interim Director, pending the selection of François-Rupert Carabin as permanent Director. Carabin would find the school too oriented toward Germany and began a major reorganization; purging it of instructors with a German background. The teachers that Schneider had appointed in 1919 were largely from his old "Saint-Nicholas Group" and came under criticism from some members of the supervisory committee; notably Gustave Stoskopf and Charles Spindler.

Schneider was able to retain a position as Professor of decorative arts. He was named a Knight of the Legion of Honor in 1924.

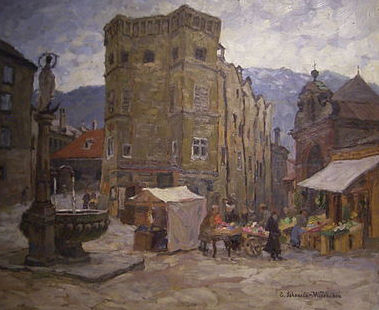
Market Scene

At the outbreak of World War II, he took refuge in Le Hohwald, officially retiring from the École in 1940. He then went to Dijon, where his daughter had become a Professor. In 1945, he joined his son in Paris and died in a suburb there, two years later.
