= Haute école des arts du Rhin =

Art school in Strasbourg, France

Coordinates: 48.5823°N 7.7584°E

Haute école des arts du Rhin (formerly École supérieure des arts décoratifs de Strasbourg, and Kunstgewerbeschule Straßburg) is a French art and music school based in Strasbourg, Alsace.

The historic main building, from 1892, is classified as a Monument historique by the French Ministry of Culture since 1981. The façade was designed by Anton Seder (himself a former pupil, at a previous building) and executed by Léon Elchinger, one of his first students.

== Gallery ==
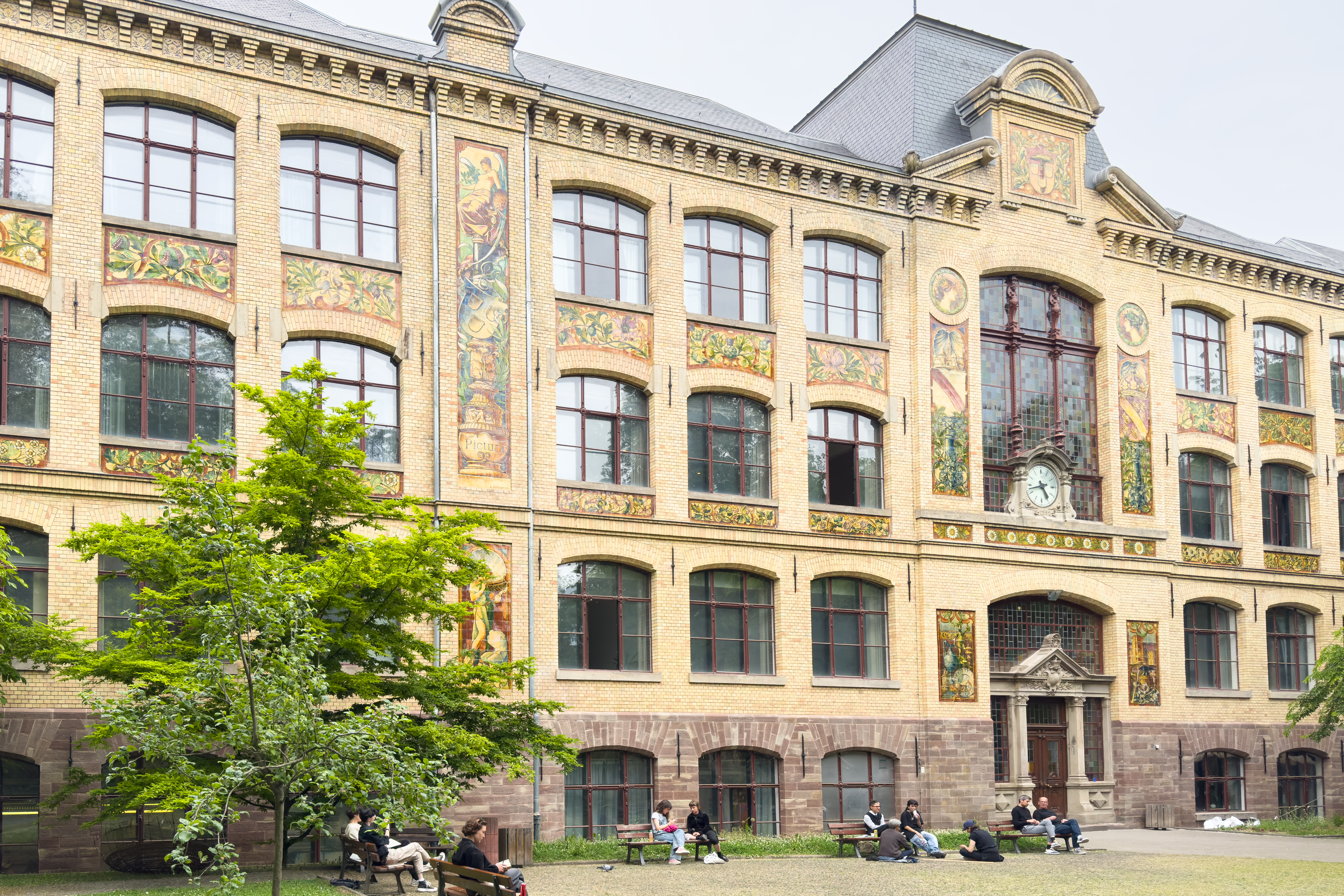

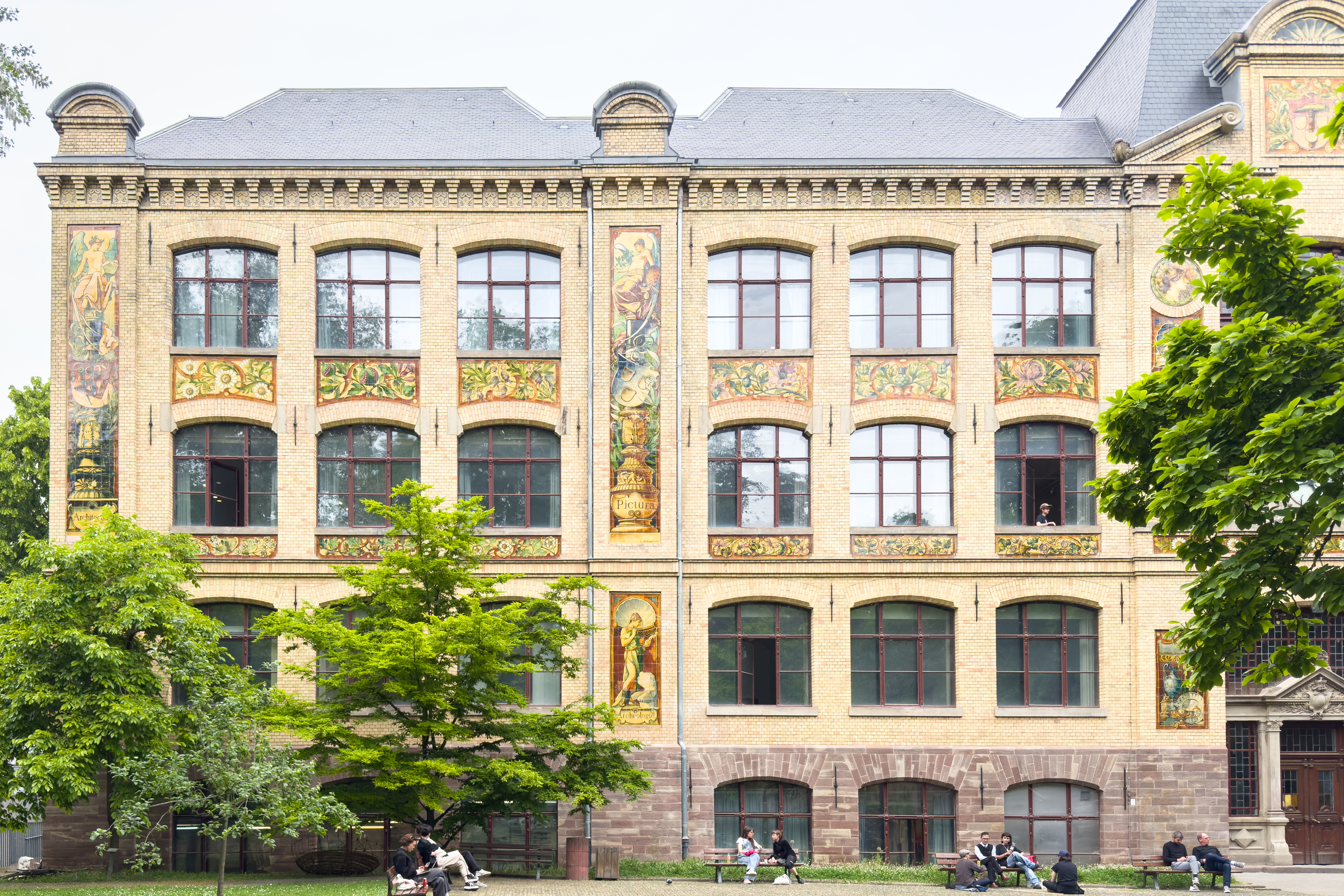

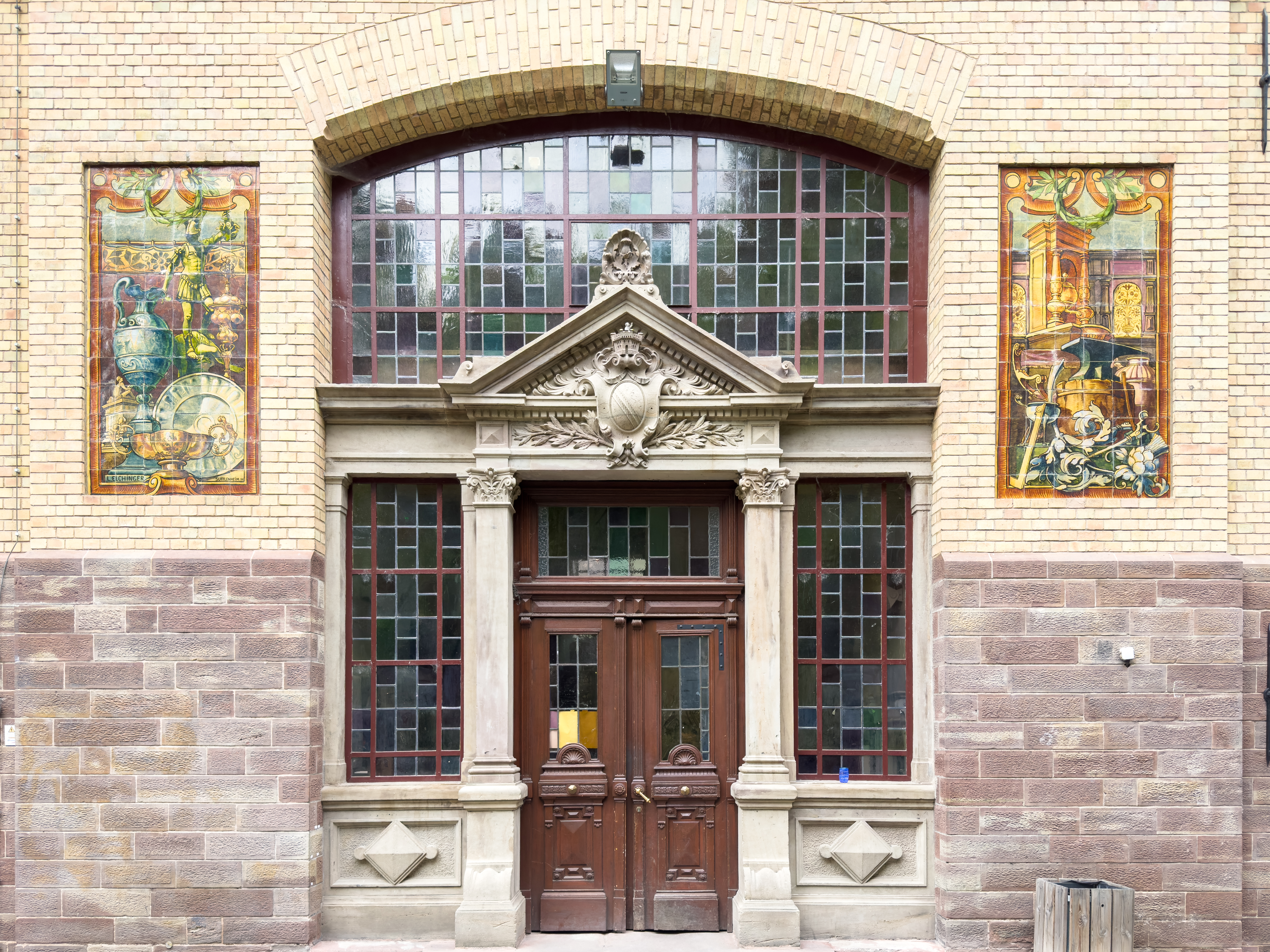

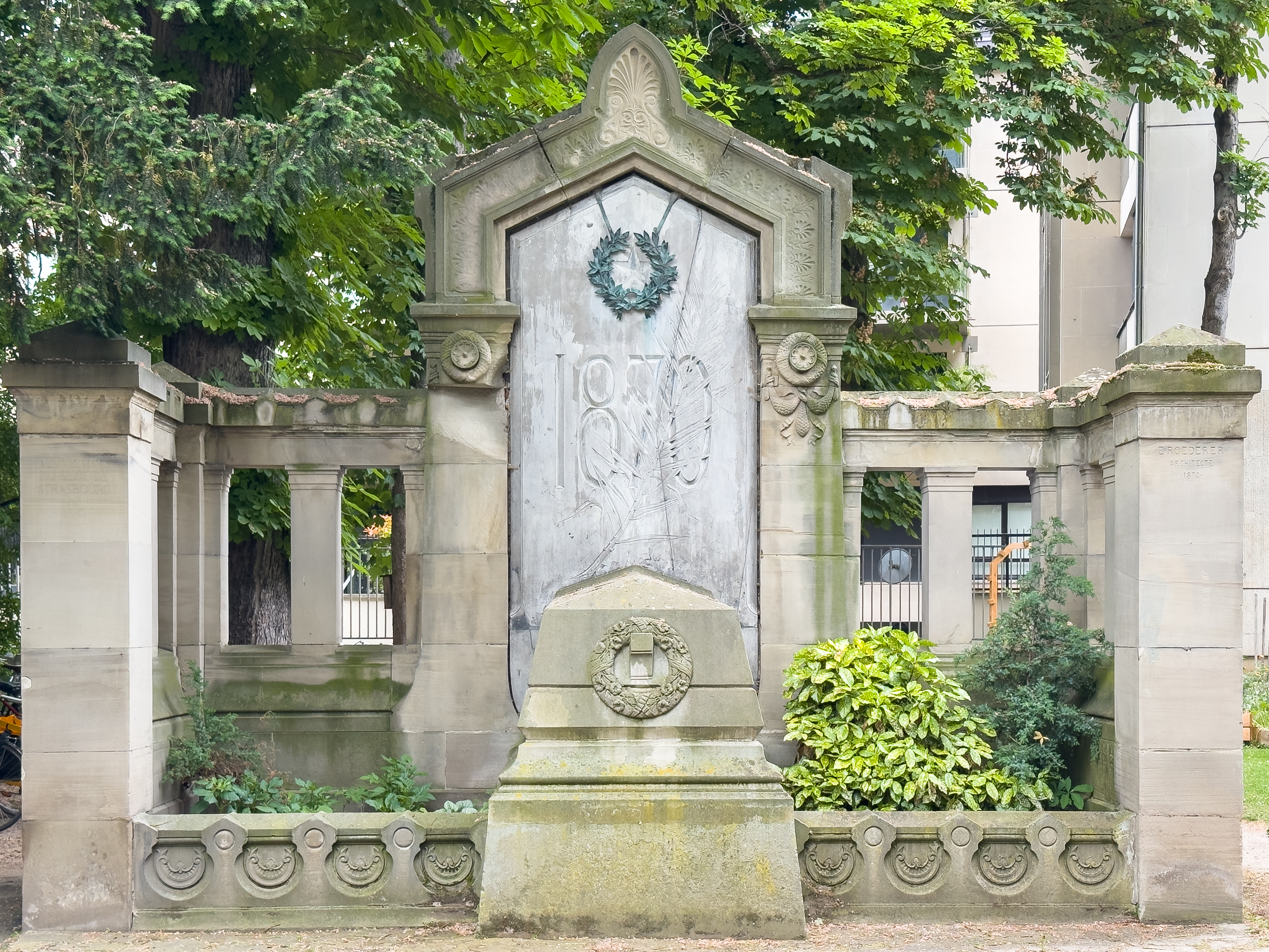

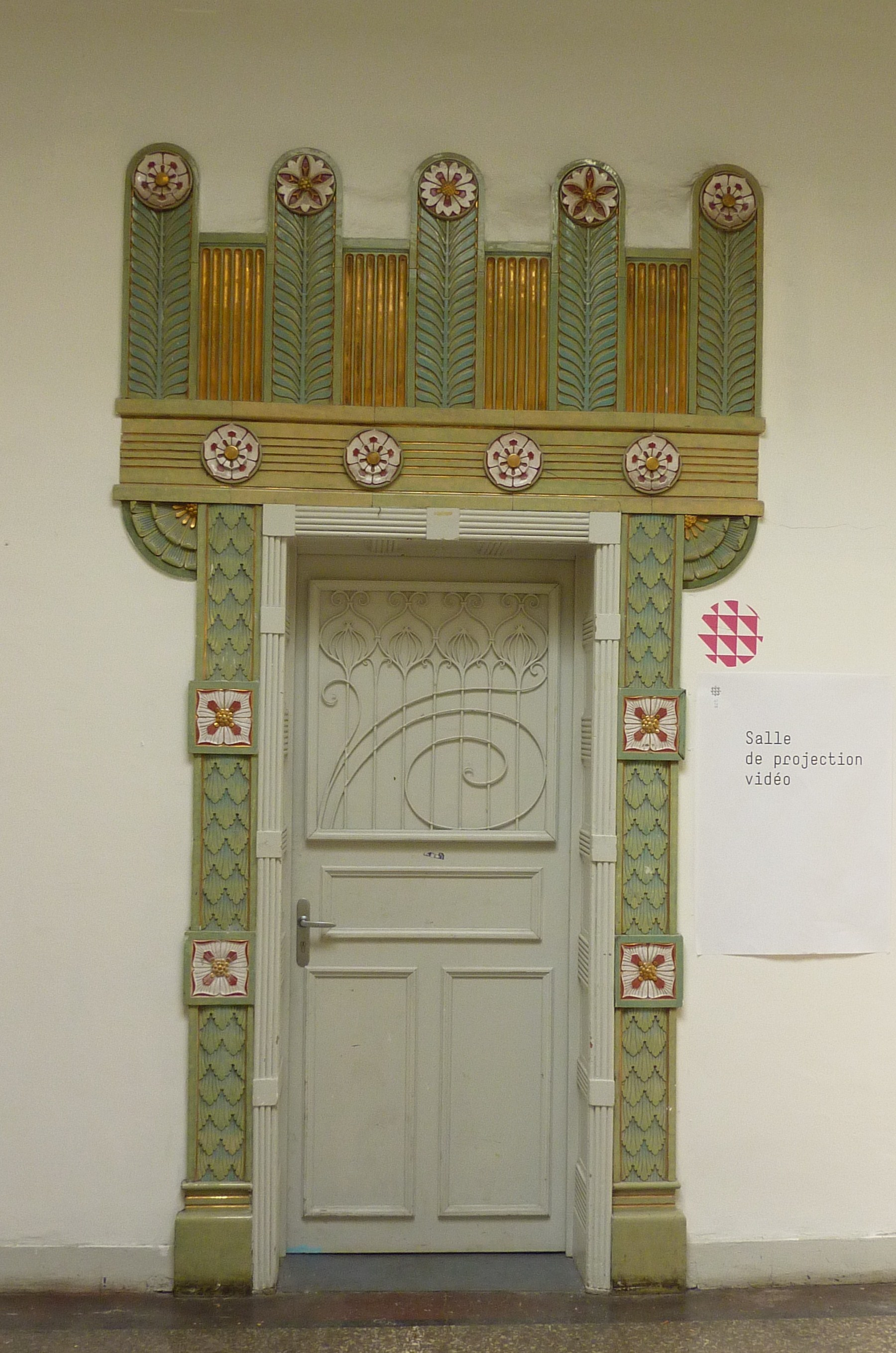
A door inside that building

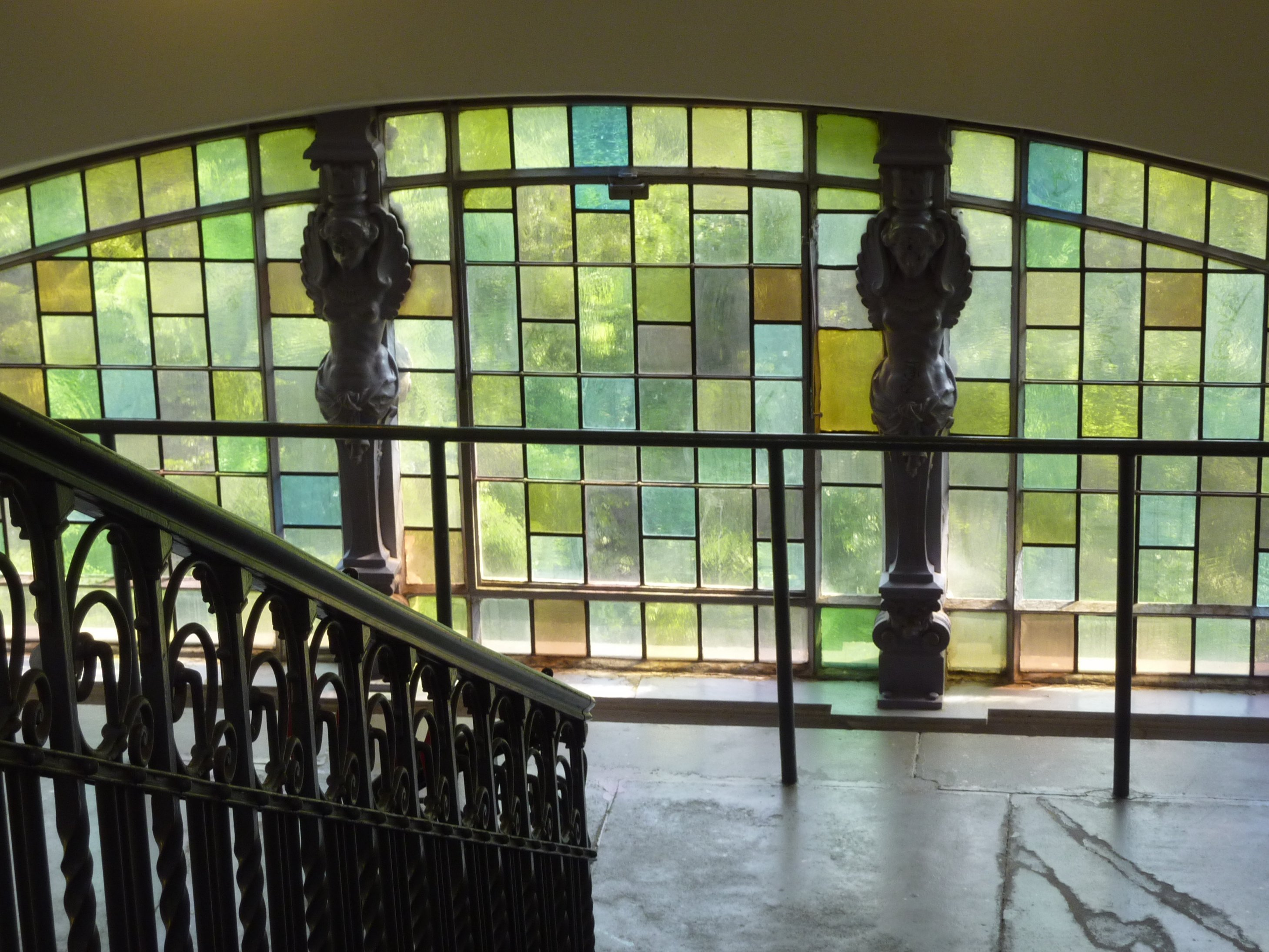
A window inside that building

== Former academics and alumni ==
The following artists have taught or been taught at the HEAR:

- Hans/Jean Arp
- René Beeh
- François-Rupert Carabin
- Jacques Charrier
- Joseph Ehrismann
- Léon Hornecker
- John Howe
- Alfred Marzolff
- Joseph Sattler
- Léo Schnug
- Tomi Ungerer
