= Joseph Sattler =

German illustrator (1867–1931)

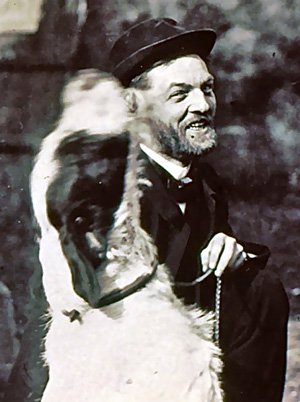
Joseph Sattler and friend (c.1910)

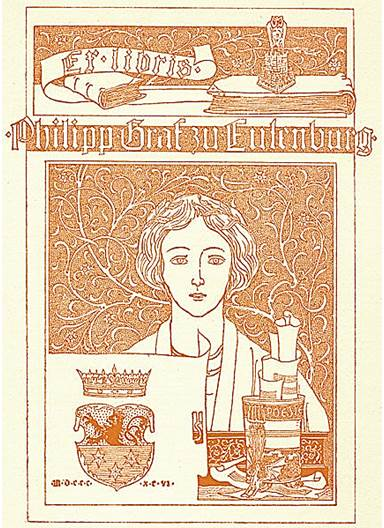
Bookplate designed for Philipp, Prince of Eulenburg

Joseph Kaspar Sattler (20 July 1867, Schrobenhausen - 12 May 1931, Munich) was a German painter, bookplate artist and Art Nouveau illustrator. He is best remembered for his work that appeared in the magazine Pan.

== Biography ==
After an apprenticeship as a painter and gilder in Landshut, he studied at the Academy of Fine Arts, Munich and became a free-lance artist. He produced a wide variety of illustrative material and briefly worked for the "Reichsdruckerei" (Imperial Printing Office). An old friendship with Léon Hornecker led him to the École des Arts Décoratifs in Strasbourg in 1891, where he was briefly retained as a drawing instructor. After that, he was able to publish his works under the aegis of Charles Spindler and, with the support of Gustave Stoskopf, participated in the Paris Salon. In 1894, the magazine La Plume arranged an invitation for him to exhibit at the Kunstgewerbemuseum Berlin.

Three years later, he designed the "Nibelungenschrift" (a type font), which was used for his monumental work "Die Nibelungen", displayed at the Exposition Universelle (1900). Only 200 copies were ever printed. He also devised a familiar Art Nouveau font that is named after him. He returned to Strasbourg in 1904 and was appointed a Professor at the École in 1917. After the war, he moved to Munich where he lived with his sister and studied lithography. In addition to Pan (one of his posters was published in Les Maîtres de l'Affiche), many of his illustrations appeared in Simplicissimus.

== Work online ==
- Ein moderner Totentanz : in 16 Bildern, one of only 100 numbered copies. Stargardt, Berlin 1912 (Digitalized version by the University and State Library Düsseldorf)
