= Alfred Marzolff =

French sculptor and medallist

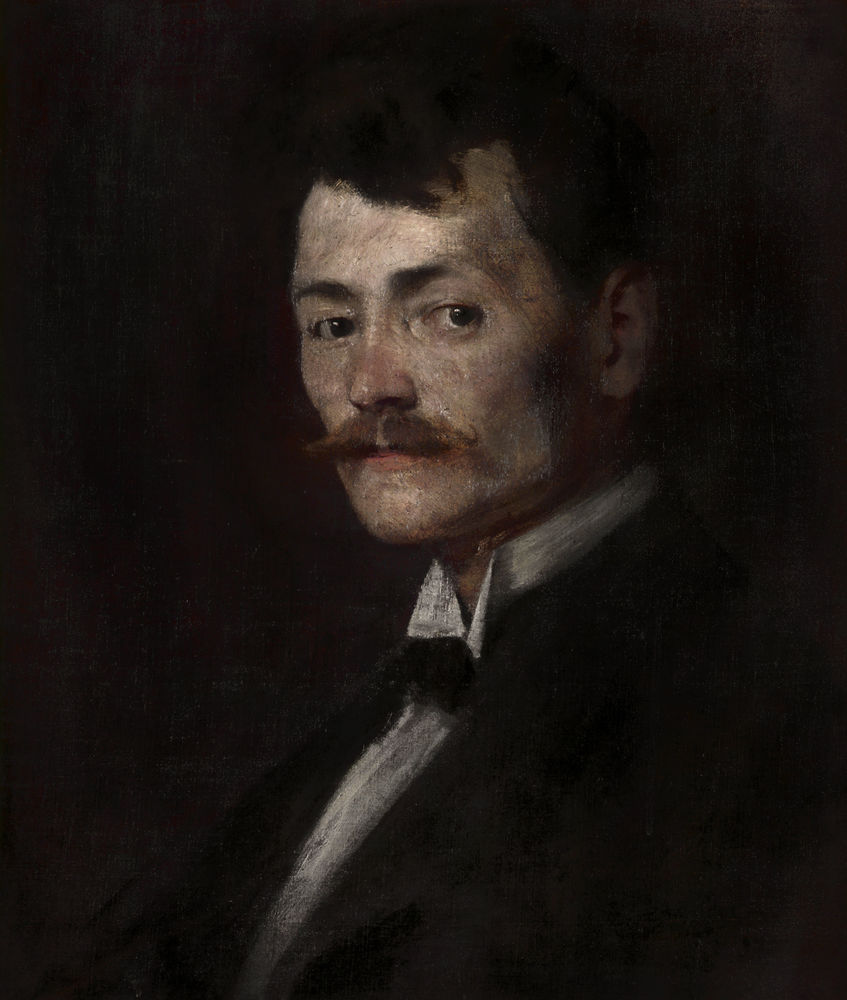
- Portrait of Alfred Marzolff by Émile Schneider
- Born: Frédéric Alfred Marzolff; 4 March 1867; Strasbourg, France
- Died: 4 May 1936 (aged 69); Rountzenheim, France
- Occupation: Sculptor

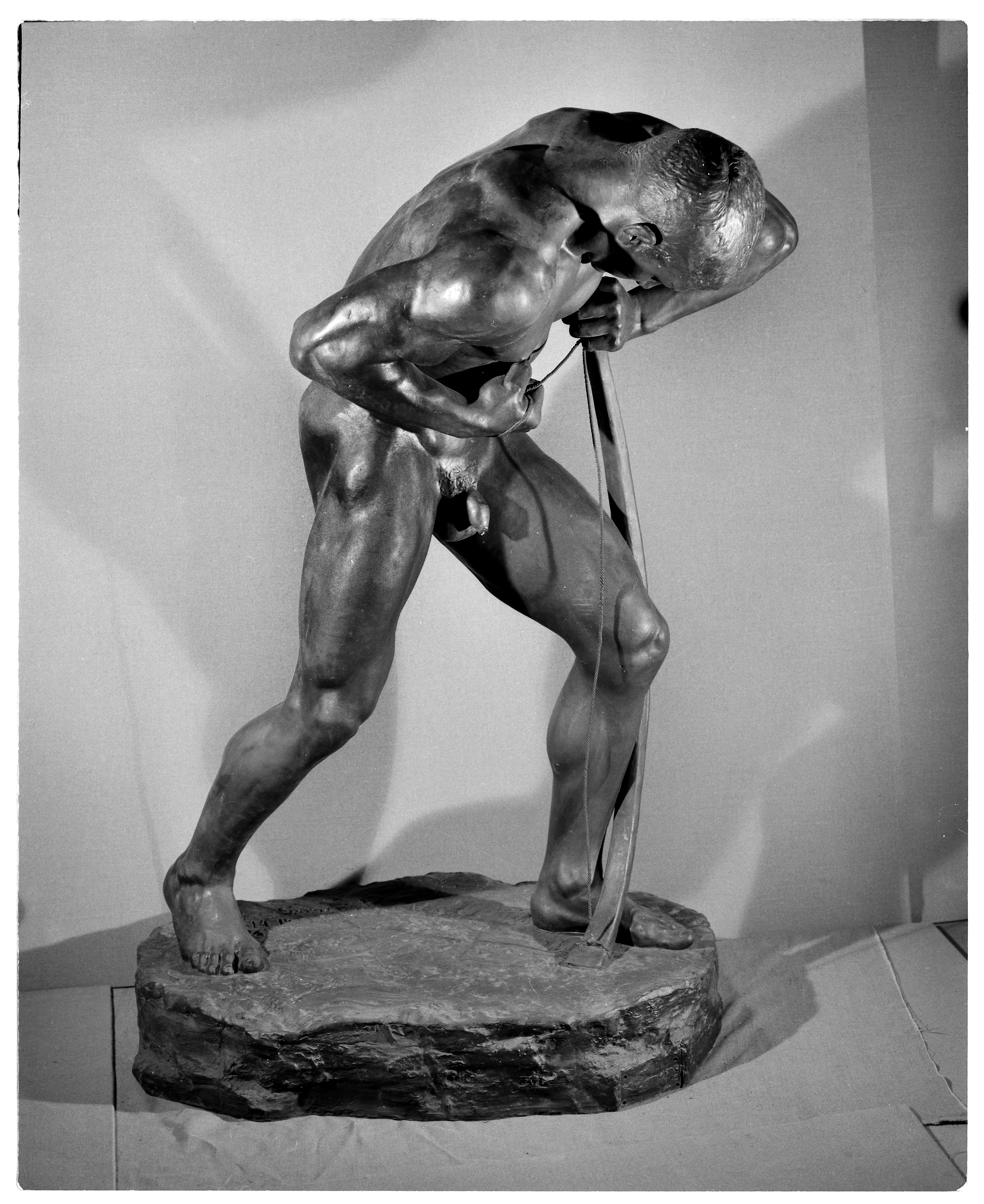
L'Archer (1893)

Frédéric Alfred Marzolff (1867-1936) was a French sculptor and medallist, known especially for his monumental figures.

== Biography ==
His father was a master cooper. He completed an apprenticeship with the sculptor and designer, Eugène Dock, who was engaged in restoring some of the monuments that had been destroyed or damaged during the Franco-Prussian War. Following that, he became a student at the École supérieure des arts décoratifs de Strasbourg.

He continued his studies in Munich with Wilhelm von Rümann. While there, he also began a lifelong professional friendship with Adolf von Hildebrand. Upon returning to Strasbourg, the École supérieur, his alma mater, hired him as a modelling teacher. He also became a member of the artists' association, the Cercle de Saint-Léonard. In addition to teaching and sculpting, he made contributions to the Revue alsacienne illustrée.

In 1891, he began exhibiting locally. In 1893, he received a first prize at the Salon for his bronze sculpture, "L'Archer".

Thanks to financial support from Hugo Prinz zu Hohenlohe-Öhringen, he was able to move to Florence in 1901. He would remain there for ten years; operating three workshops and producing monumental sculptures, as well as bronze busts and medallions. Returning to Strasbourg in 1911, he worked there until the outbreak of World War I, when he relocated to Rountzenheim.

After the war, his studio was flooded with orders for war memorials. In 1931, he was decorated with the Ordre des Palmes académiques.

Many of his works may still be seen around his native city; some were, however, destroyed during the German occupation of France during World War II. Among his surviving works are the bust of Viktor Nessler in the Parc de l'Orangerie in Strasbourg and the statues of Daniel Specklin and Jacob Sturm von Sturmeck on the façade of the Petites-Boucheries, behind the Aubette.

== Sources ==
- "Alfred Marzolff (1867-1936), sculpteur et médailleur" (Les Amis de la Léonardsau et du Cercle de Saint-Léonard)
