= Anton Seder =

German professor (1850–1916)

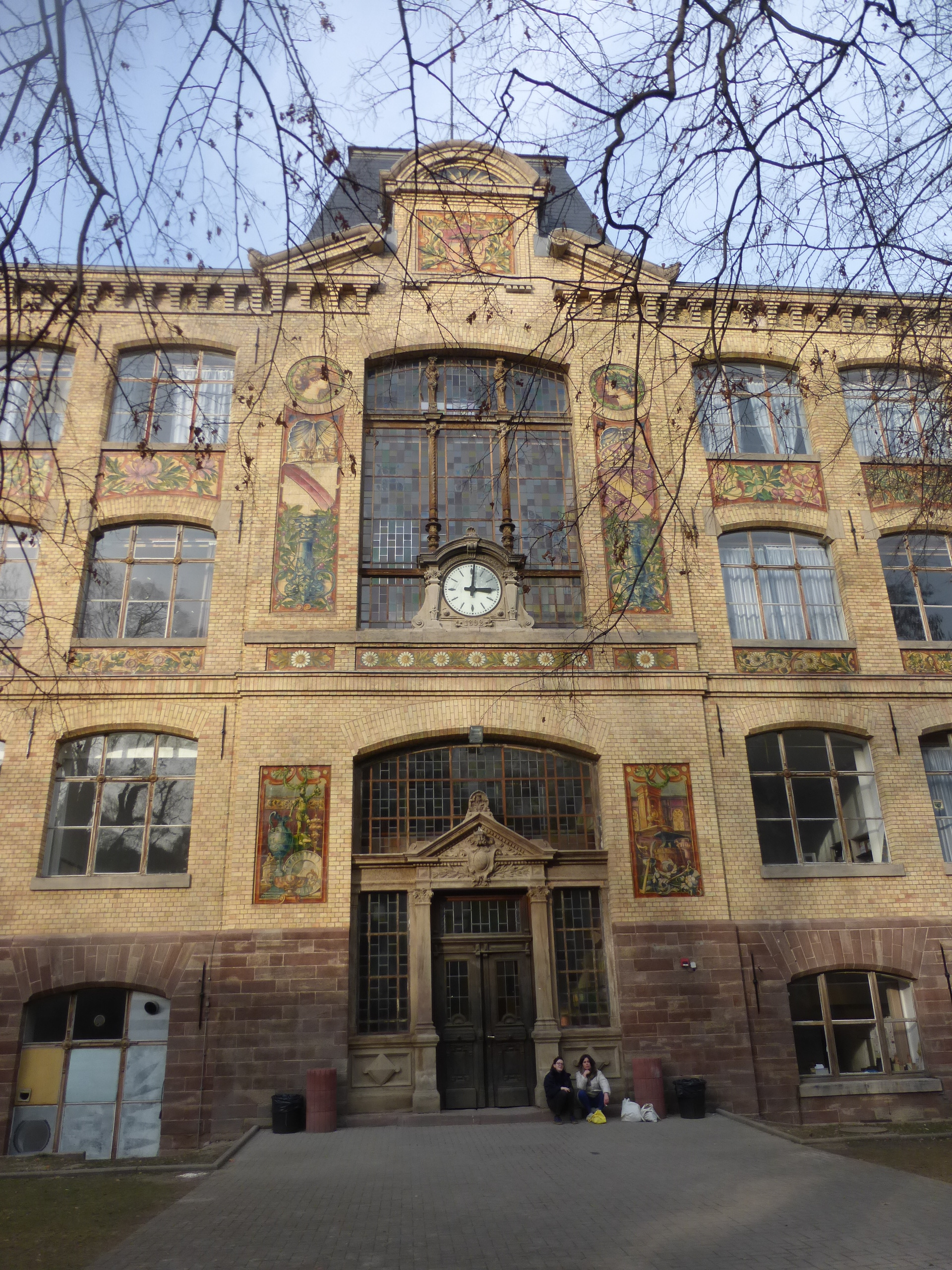
Façade of the École supérieure

Anton Johann Nepomuk Seder (11 January 1850, Munich - 1 December 1916, Strasbourg) was an Art Nouveau designer, art professor and Director of the Kunstgewerbeschule (Arts and Crafts School) in Strasbourg.

== Biography ==
His father, Christian Seder, was an inspector of army equipment. At the age of nineteen, he enrolled at the Academy of Fine Arts, Munich. His career began in 1878, teaching architecture at the Technikum in Winterthur, Switzerland. In 1882. he returned to Munich, where he worked as a sculptor at the Academy. He also made several brief study trips to Italy.

In 1889, he was appointed Director of the new École supérieure des arts décoratifs de Strasbourg, winning out over thirty-nine other candidates. In 1892, the school was able to move into its present building, whose façade he had designed and which was executed by Léon Elchinger, one of his first students. Exhibits held during the 1890s cemented the school's reputation as an innovative institution and spread its influence throughout Germany. Among the major changes he made were his emphasis on the workshop over the classroom, and the hiring of younger teachers, who were more open to experimentation.

As the 20th century began, and styles changed, not all went well. In 1907, he was criticized by former students who were unable to find work. As World War I approached, local artists complained that the school was too German. By the time of Seder's retirement in 1915, its once high reputation was largely gone.

In addition to teaching, he created decorative panels for the entrance hall and stairwell at the Institute of Zoology (now part of the University of Strasbourg). His works on the Pont d'Auvergne, a bridge near the University, have not been preserved. He was also involved in goldsmithing and ironwork. Some grillwork for Sainte-Madeleine Church (now at the Strasbourg Museum of Modern and Contemporary Art) is a notable example.

As an author, he published at least ten books on drawing and painting between 1882 and 1903. From 1901, he was a co-editor at the professional journal, Das Kunstgewerbe in Elsass-Lothringen.

== Sources ==
- Jean-Claude Richez: Städtische Kunstgewerbeschule Straßburg (1889–1914). (PDF-Datei; 1,3 MB).
- (in German) Susanna Partsch: Seder, Anton. In: Allgemeines Künstlerlexikon. Die Bildenden Künstler aller Zeiten und Völker (AKL). Band 102, de Gruyter, Berlin [?], S. 450
