= Charles Spindler =

Alsatian painter and writer (1865 - 1938)

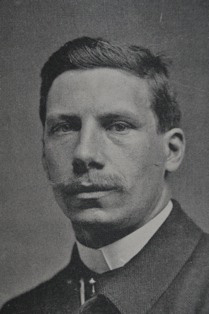
Charles Spindler (date unknown)

Charles Spindler (11 March 1865 in Bœrsch – 3 March 1938 in Bœrsch) was an Alsatian painter, marquetry inlayer, writer and photographer. He was also a supporter of Alsatian regionalism and founded several institutions for the promotion of Alsatian culture.

== Life and work ==
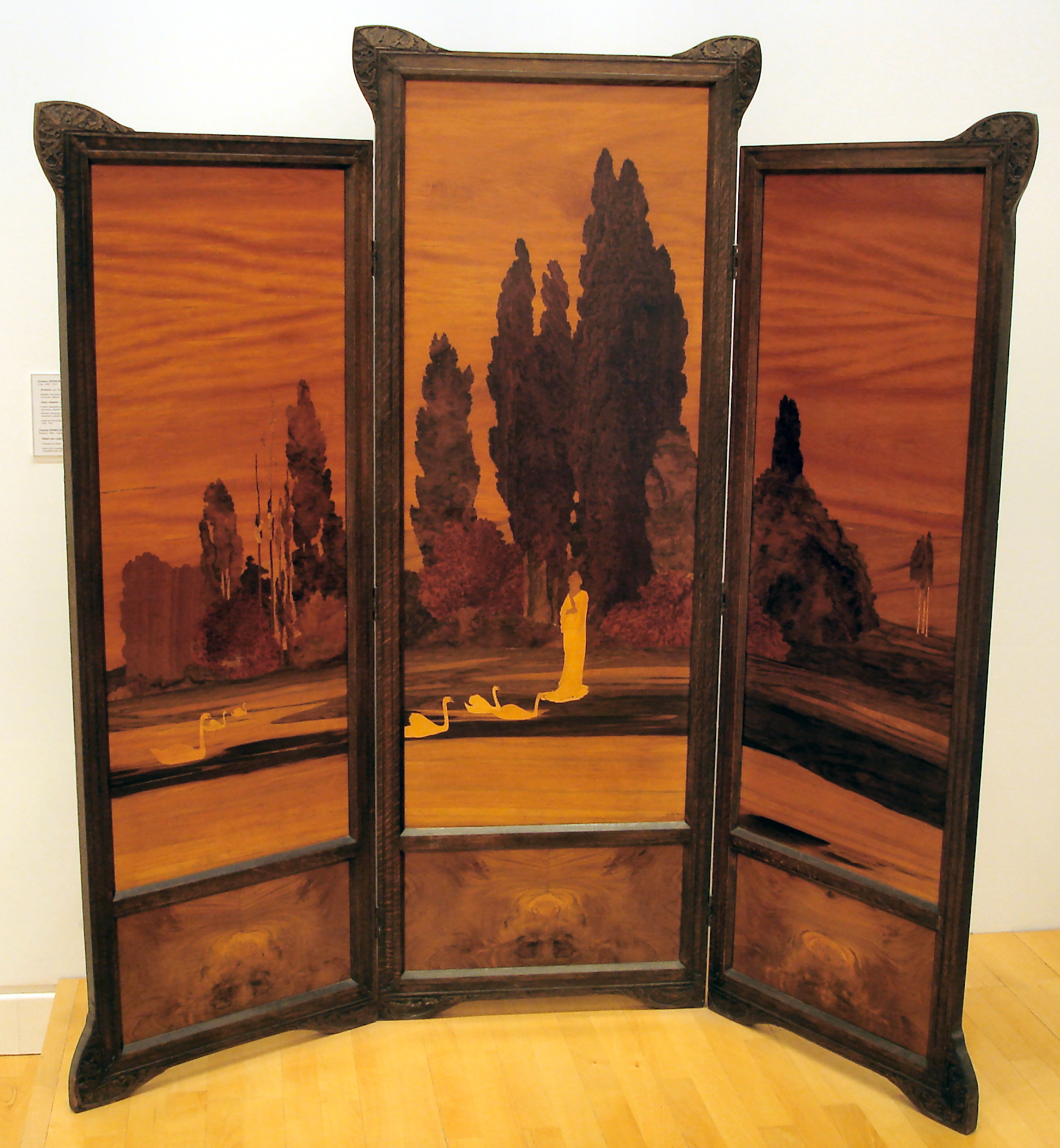
Lady With Swans (marquetry screen, in the Musée d'Art Moderne et Contemporain de Strasbourg)

His father was a notary. At the age of twelve, he was enrolled in drawing classes and received encouragement to make art a career from his uncle Louis-Pierre Spindler, a painter. A scholarship he received in 1882 enabled him to study in Düsseldorf, Munich and Berlin. While in Munich, he met Martin von Feuerstein, a painter of sacred art, who introduced him to the Ott Brothers (glass makers) in 1887. After executing several projects for them in Strasbourg and completing his military service, he returned to Bœrsch, but found little work. By chance, he befriended Anselme Laugel, a politician and writer who painted in his spare time and became a major supporter of Spindler's efforts.

In 1893, Spindler and his friend Joseph Sattler began Les Images Alsaciennes, a journal they published until 1896. This enabled Spindler to establish a workshop in Saint-Léonard (a district of Bœrsch) in 1897. Next came the Revue Alsacienne Illustrée, published from 1898 to 1914. Both journals were influential in promoting Alsatian culture. Also in 1893, he discovered marquetry and strove to apply it as a painting technique, rather than decorative ornamentation.

He worked with equal facility in many mediums; posters and books, glass, boxes and trays, wood paneling and, most significantly, inlaid furniture for interior decoration. He also worked in collaboration with others, such as Léon Elchinger (pottery) and Jean-Désiré Ringel d'Illzach (sculpture).

== Books ==
=== As author ===
- L’âge d’or d’un artiste en Alsace : mémoires inédits, 1889-1914, Éditions Place Stanislas (2009) ISBN 978-2-355-78034-9

=== As author/illustrator/photographer ===
- Une Alsace 1900, Éditions Place Stanislas ISBN 2-355-78078-1 (originally published 1920)
- Ceux d’Alsace, Éditions Place Stanislas ISBN 2-355-78055-2 (originally published 1925)
- L’Alsace pendant la guerre 1914-1918, Strasbourg, Treuttel & Würtz (1925)

=== As illustrator ===
- Les Oberlé, by René Bazin. Translated as The Children of Alsace, Brentano's (1915)
- Costumes et Coutumes d’Alsace, by Anselm Laugel. Colmar Press (1975)
