= List of Alsatians and Lotharingians =

This is an incomplete list of well-known Alsatians and Lorrainians (people from the region of Alsace and the region of Lorraine). Alsatian culture is Alemannic, with German and French influences.

== Alsatians ==
- Jakob Ammann (1644–between 1712 and 1730), anabaptist preacher and namesake of Amish movement
- Frédéric Auguste Bartholdi (1834–1904), sculptor, designer of the Statue of Liberty
- Hippolyte Bernheim (1840–1919), neurologist
- René Beeh (1886−1922), artist
- Marc Bloch (1886–1944), historian
- Jean Arp (1886–1966), artist
- Hans Bethe (1906–2005), nuclear physicist, 1967 Nobel Prize in Physics laureate
- Mehdi Baala (born 1978)
- Karl Brandt
- Sébastien Brant
- Martin Bucer
- Wolfgang Capito
- Johann Stephan Decker (1784–1844), painter
- Gustave Doré, artist, engraver, illustrator and sculptor
- Alfred Dreyfus, military officer
- Christine Ferber (born 1960), pastry chef and chocolatier
- Charles de Foucauld
- Charles Friedel
- Charles Frédéric Gerhardt
- Gottfried von Strassburg
- Ion Gheorghe Maurer, Prime-Minister of Romania (1961-1974)
- Johann Herrmann
- Josel of Rosheim
- Caspar Isenmann
- Valérien Ismaël
- Alfred Kastler
- François Christophe Kellermann
- Jean-Baptiste Kléber
- Jacques Paul Klein
- Maurice Koechlin
- Katia and Maurice Krafft
- Herrad of Landsberg
- François Joseph Lefebvre
- Jean-Marie Lehn
- Pope Leo IX
- Sébastien Loeb
- Philip James de Loutherbourg
- Ludwig I of Bavaria
- Marcel Marceau
- Master of the Drapery Studies
- Paul-Henri Mathieu
- Yvan Muller
- Charles Münch
- Thomas Murner
- Victor Nessler
- Jean Frédéric Oberlin
- Jérémie Jacques Oberlin
- Thierry Omeyer
- Pierre Pflimlin
- Jean Rapp
- Beatus Rhenanus
- Claude Rich
- Paul Rohmer
- Andreas Franz Wilhelm Schimper
- Wilhelm Philippe Schimper
- Francis Schlatter
- Morgan Schneiderlin
- Schlumberger brothers
- Martin Schongauer
- Albert Schweitzer
- Philipp Jacob Spener
- Sebastian Stoskopff
- Jacques Sturm
- Charles Xavier Thomas
- Catherine Trautmann
- Marie Tussaud
- Tomi Ungerer
- Emile Waldteufel
- Jean-Jacques Waltz
- Arsène Wenger
- Jacob Wimpfeling
- Charles-Adolphe Wurtz
- William Wyler

== Lotharingians ==
- Lou Albert-Lasard
- Raymond Aron
- Maurice Barrès
- Jacques Callot
- Emile Durkheim, sociologist
- Emile Gallé
- Claude Gellée
- Joan of Arc, national heroine of France
- Jean Lurçat
- Marcel Mauss
- Michel Platini
- Henri Poincaré, mathematician and physicist
- Raymond Poincaré, President of France

== Undesignated ==
- Léon Blum (Alsatian extraction)
- Daniel Blumenthal
- Ettore and Jean Bugatti, automotive designers
- Albert Carré, opera director
- Henri Cartan
- Claude, Duke of Guise
- Paul Colin
- Robert de Cotte
- Darry Cowl
- Pierre Dac
- Mireille Delunsch
- Emile Erckmann
- Alfred Faust
- Charles Fehrenbach (astronomer)
- Jules Ferry
- Johann Fischart
- René Fonck
- Franz I, Holy Roman Emperor
- Pierre Fresnay
- Émile Friant
- Henri Grégoire
- Antoine Griezmann
- Johannes Gutenberg, invented movable type printing
- Counts of Habsburg
- Jean-Jacques Henner
- Hugo Hergesell
- Rouget de l'Isle
- Patricia Kaas
- Marie Pierre Koenig
- Antoine Charles Louis Lasalle, general
- Stanislaus I Leszczyński, King of Poland
- Jules Bastien-Lepage
- Charles Loeffler
- Lothair II of Lotharingia
- Johanan Luria
- Hubert Lyautey
- Nathalie Marquay
- André Maurois, author
- Jules Méline
- Michel Ney
- François-Joseph Offenstein
- Pilâtre de Rozier
- Rabbenu Gershom
- Louis Ratisbonne
- Pierre-Louis Roederer
- Richard Rohmer (Alsatian extraction)
- Maurice de Saxe
- Johannes Schefferus
- Victor Schœlcher
- Robert Schuman
- Paul Schutzenberger
- Jean-Jacques Servan-Schreiber (Alsatian extraction)
- Sébastien Le Prestre de Vauban
- Paul Verlaine, poet
- Zwentibold

== See also ==
- Alsace
- Duchy of Lorraine
- List of Strasbourg people
- French American
- French people
- German American
- German people
- List of French Americans
- List of French people
- List of German Americans
- List of Germans
- Lorraine
- Lotharingia
