= Grünwald =

Grünwald (transliterated Gruenwald) is German for "green forest" and may refer to:

== Places ==
- Grünwald, Austria, town in Aigen-Schlägl municipality, Rohrbach, Austria
- Grünwald, Bavaria, municipality south of Munich, Germany

== People ==
- Alexander Grünwald (born 1989), Austrian footballer
- Alfred Grünwald (librettist) (1884–1951), Austrian librettist
- Béla Iványi-Grünwald (1867–1940), Hungarian painter
- Béla Grünwald (1839–1891), Hungarian politician and historian
- Georg Grünwald (1490–1540), German Protestant reformer
- Géza Grünwald (1910–1943), Hungarian mathematician
- Johannes Theodor Baargeld (1892–1927; legal name: Alfred Emanuel Ferdinand Grünwald), German painter and poet
- Karl Grünwald (1887–1964), Austrian art collector
- Luca Grünwald (born 1994), German motorcycle racer
- Ludwig Grünwald (1863–1927), German otolaryngologist
- Mark Gruenwald (1953–1996), American comic book writer
- Malchiel Gruenwald (1882–1958), Israeli hotelier, amateur journalist and stamp collector
- Niklaus Grünwald, American biologist
- Pascal Grünwald (born 1982), Austrian footballer
- Sidonie Grünwald-Zerkowitz (1852–1907), Austro-Hungarian writer, translator and fashion designer
- Vittorio Grünwald (1855–1943), Italian mathematician

== See also ==
- Greenwald (disambiguation)
- Grunwald (disambiguation)
- Grünewald (disambiguation)
- Battle of Grunwald
