= Alfred Grünwald =

Alfred Grünwald may refer to:

- Alfred Grünwald (librettist) (1884–1951), Austrian librettist
- Johannes Theodor Baargeld, pseudonym of Alfred Emanuel Ferdinand Grünwald (1892–1927), German painter and poet
- Al Grunwald (1930–2011), American baseball player

== See also ==
- Grünwald (disambiguation)
