= Strasbourg Museum of Modern and Contemporary Art =

Art museum in Strasbourg, France

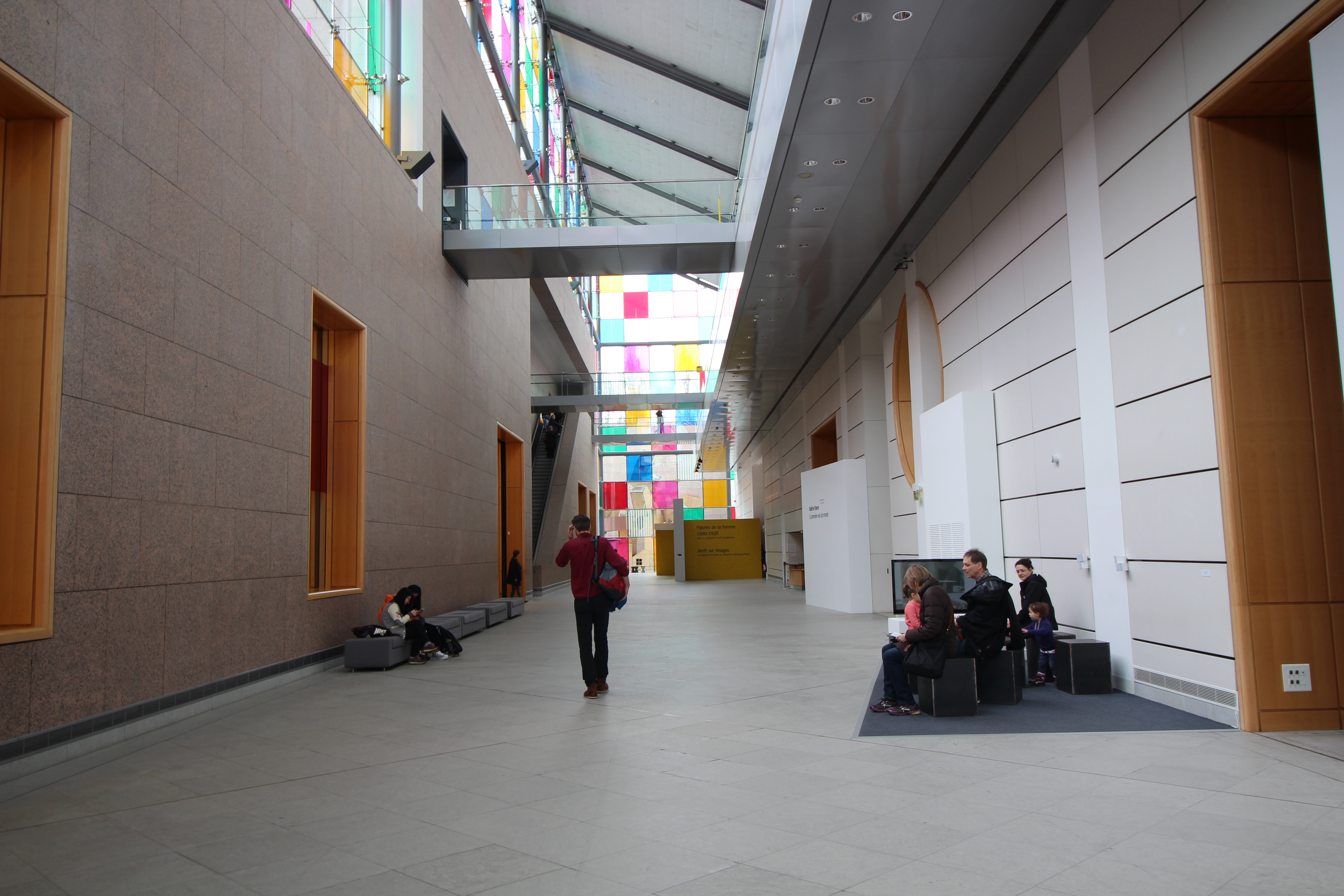
- Interactive fullscreen map
- Coordinates: 48.579444°N 7.736111°E
- Website: en.musees.strasbourg.eu/museum-of-modern-and-contemporary-art

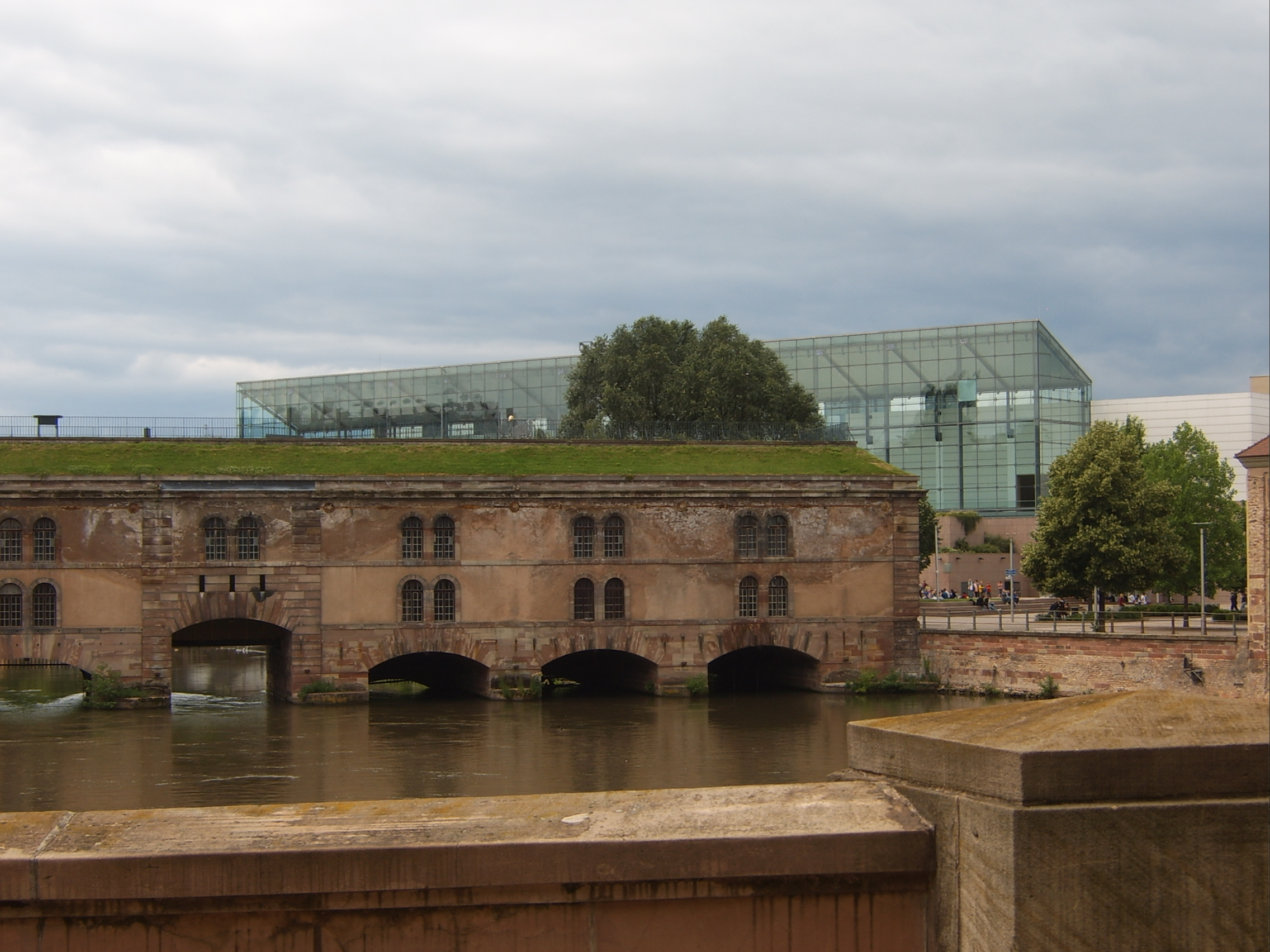
Barrage Vauban and MAMCS

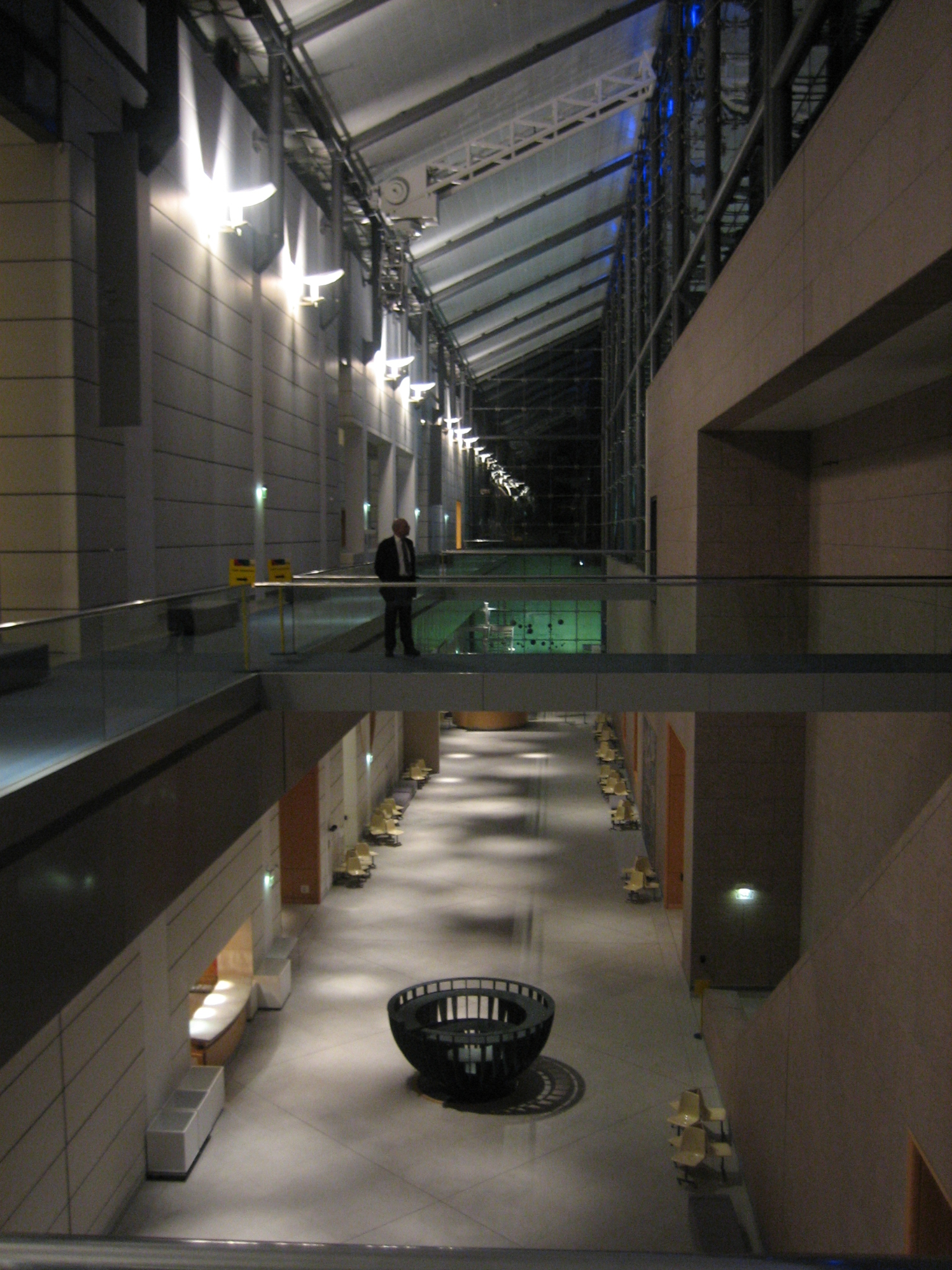
Interior view at night

The Musée d'Art Moderne et Contemporain de Strasbourg (MAMCS, Museum of Modern and Contemporary Art) is an art museum in Strasbourg, France, which was founded in 1973 and opened in its own building in November 1998.

One of the largest of its kind in France, the museum houses extensive collections of paintings, sculpture, graphic arts, multimedia and design from the period between 1870 (Impressionism) and today, as well as a wide range of pieces in its photographic library. It owns a total of 18,400 works. Numerous exhibitions are organized annually, showing either the works of a particular artist or a retrospective of an artistic genre. The art library of the municipal museums (Bibliothèque d'art des musées municipaux), the art book shop of the municipal museums (Librairie d'art des musées municipaux) and a multi-purpose auditorium for conferences, films and concerts are also found in the same building. The spacious roof terrace accommodates a museum cafe.

== Building ==
The municipal collection of modern and contemporary art of the city of Strasbourg has been constantly enlarged and enriched since 1871 and the founding of the Reichsland Alsace-Lorraine. There had already been plans to erect an independent museum since the 1960s.

The building was constructed on the left bank of the river Ill from 1995 until 1998. It was designed by the Parisian architect Adrien Fainsilber, who had already designed the Cité des Sciences et de l'Industrie in the French capital. The exhibition and usable floor space open out on both sides of a central glass covered walk, which is conceived in cathedral-like dimensions, with an interior length of 104 meters and an interior height of 22 meters. A horse sculpture (4 meters high), Hortus conclusus, by the Italian artist Mimmo Paladino is placed on the museum's roof. The building is located at the edge of the old quarter of the city (Petite France), in front of the administrative center of the department (École nationale d'administration) and near the architecturally important baroque weir Barrage Vauban and the medieval tower bridge Ponts couverts. It is also served by its own tramway stop on the Strasbourg tramway ("Musée d'Art moderne", line B).

== Collections ==
As of 11 October 2024, the museum's collections comprised 18,416 works in total, among which 1,817 paintings, 5,529 drawings, 905 sculptures, 4,219 prints and 3,674 photographs. Among famous artists, it comprises 435 works by Gustave Doré, 161 works by Max Klinger, 60 works by Jean Arp, 38 works by Victor Brauner, 29 works by Sophie Taeuber-Arp, 22 by Vassily Kandinsky, 10 by César Domela, 7 by Theo van Doesburg and several by Käthe Kollwitz, Max Ernst, František Kupka; besides works by slightly less celebrated artists like Lou Albert-Lasard (2,004 works), François-Rupert Carabin (775 works), Marcelle Cahn (368 works), Lothar von Seebach (321 works), Jean-Désiré Ringel d'Illzach (250 works), etc. A further accent is set by contemporary German painters (Markus Lüpertz, Eugen Schönebeck, Georg Baselitz, Jörg Immendorff, A. R. Penck, Albert Oehlen, Daniel Richter, Jonathan Meese, Thomas Scheibitz, Wolf Vostell etc.), who give a representative glimpse of an art genre which is otherwise rarely seen in France, especially on this scale.

The Musée d’Art Moderne et Contemporain de Strasbourg also owns the first cubist painting ever purchased by a public French collection, "Still Life" (1911) by Georges Braque, acquired in 1923, as well as the first painting by Dante Gabriel Rossetti purchased by a public French collection, "Joan of Arc Kissing the Sword of Deliverance" (1863), acquired in 1996 (now displayed in the Musée des Beaux-Arts).

Further important exhibited works of fine artists are (selected):

- Carla Accardi
- Camille Pissarro
- Claude Monet
- Auguste Rodin
- Max Liebermann
- Edward Burne-Jones
- Auguste Rodin
- Francis Picabia
- Pablo Picasso
- Alexander Archipenko
- Wassily Kandinsky
- Ossip Zadkine
- Paul Klee
- Max Ernst
- Theo van Doesburg
- Sophie Taeuber-Arp
- Auguste Herbin
- Alberto Magnelli
- Jean Hélion
- Asger Jorn
- Arman
- Gilles Aillaud
- Malcolm Morley

The collection of Alsatian artists is also important, in terms of their number and at least their regional value, representing such genres as Art Nouveau, Expressionism and New Realism: Charles Spindler, René Beeh, Jean-Désiré Ringel d'Illzach, Henri Beecke, Luc Hueber, Martin Hubrecht and Camille Claus.

The photographic library of the museum has several thousand photographs, from the origin of photography up until today, including works of Nadar, Eugène Atget, Eadweard Muybridge, Étienne-Jules Marey, August Sander, Willy Maywald, Josef Sudek, Robert Mapplethorpe, Duane Michals and Jan Saudek. Regional photography is also acknowledged.

The artistic video collection has works of Bill Viola, Nam June Paik, Woody Vasulka, Olaf Breuning and many others.

=== Looted art and restitution ===
In 1999, a French court ordered that the museum restitute to a Jewish family a work by Gustav Klimt (Die Erfülling) looted by the Nazis during World War II. Museum officials argued that they knew nothing about its wartime past. The Klimt had been owned by Karl Grunwald, an Austrian art dealer and was confiscated in 1940 when the Nazis invaded France and sold at public auction in 1943. The non-profit Friends of Strasbourg Museums bought the painting in 1959 for a low price and donated it to the museum. The family sued the city of Strasbourg, and the case that took 13 years to resolve. It was formally restituted in 2000.

=== Gallery ===
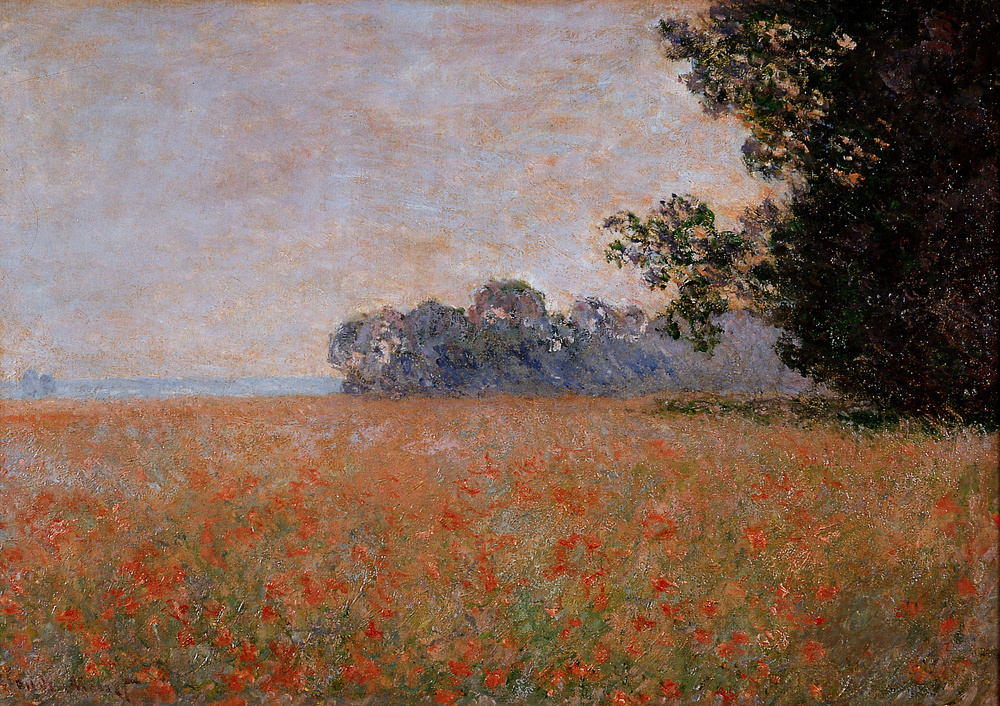
Claude Monet, Champ d'avoine aux coquelicots

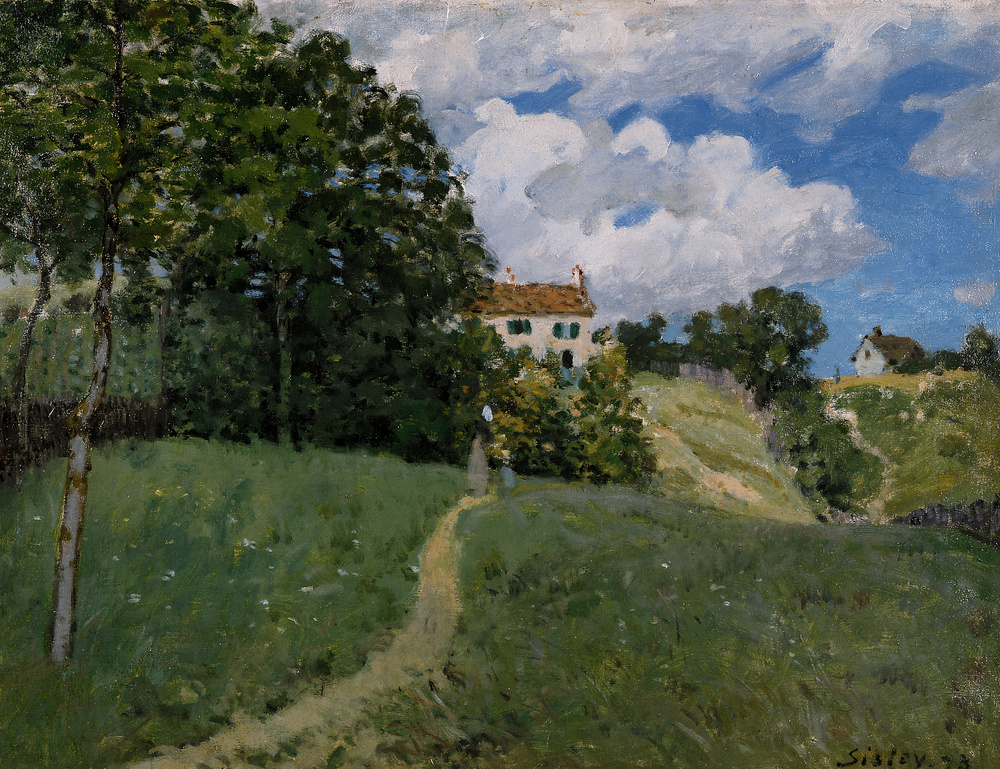
Alfred Sisley, Paysage avec maisons

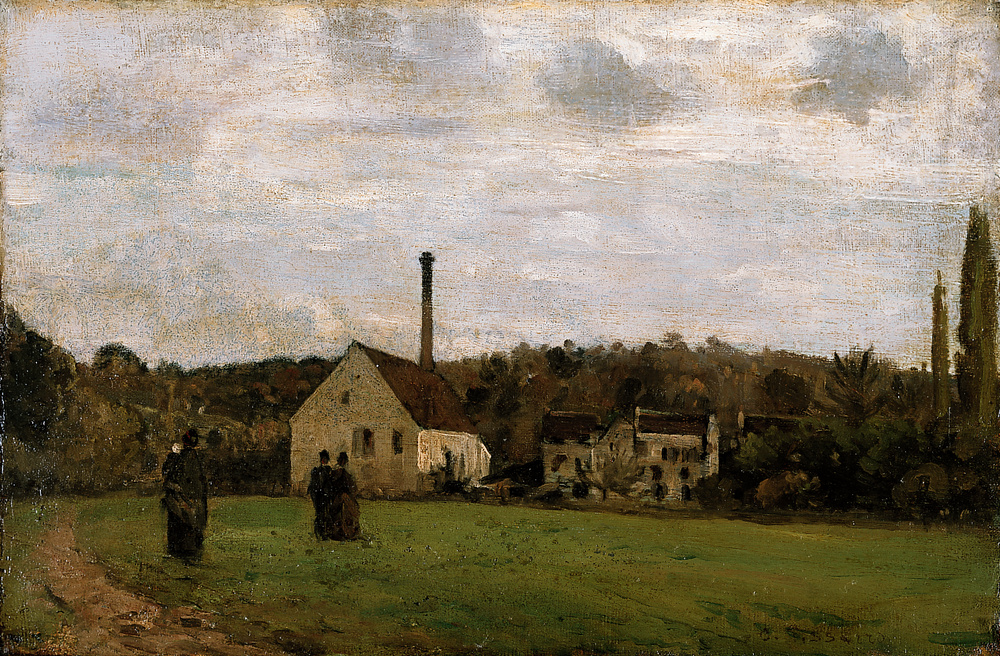
Camille Pissarro, La Petite Fabrique

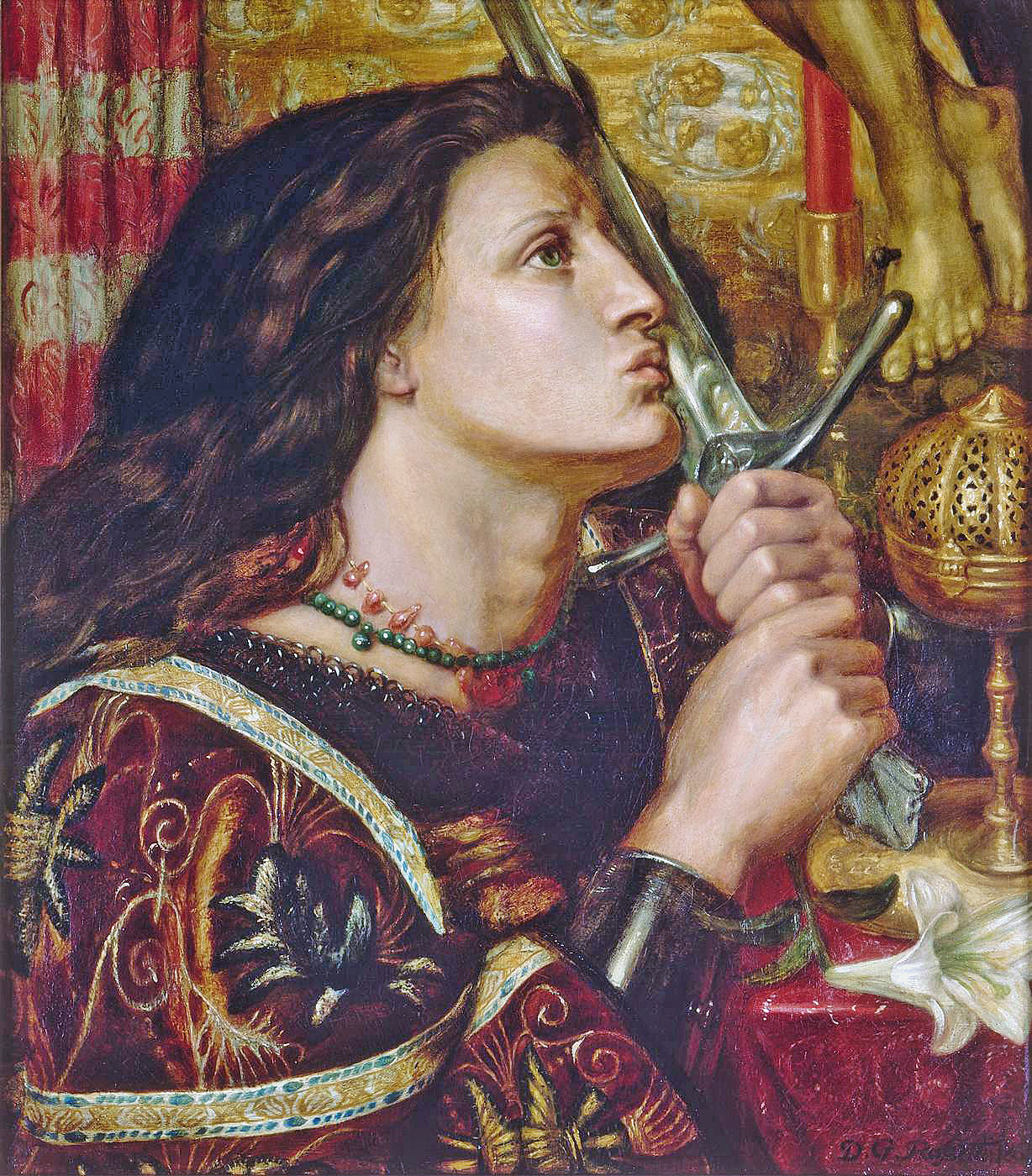
Dante Gabriel Rossetti, Joan of Arc Kissing the Sword of Deliverance

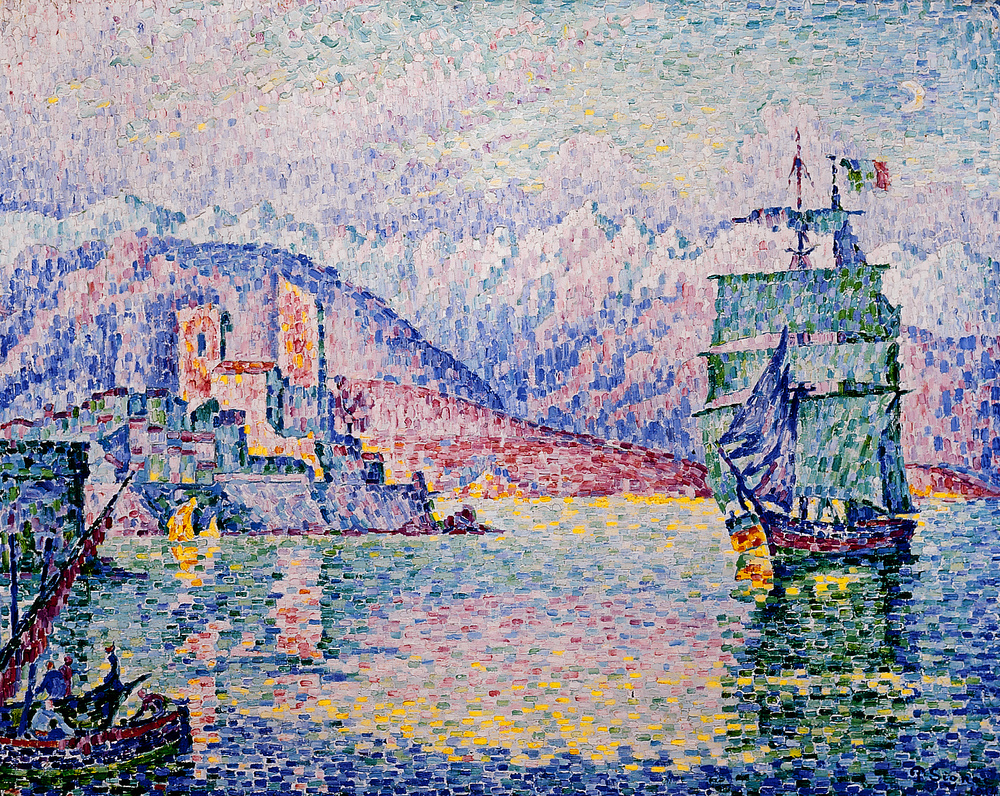
Paul Signac, Antibes, le soir

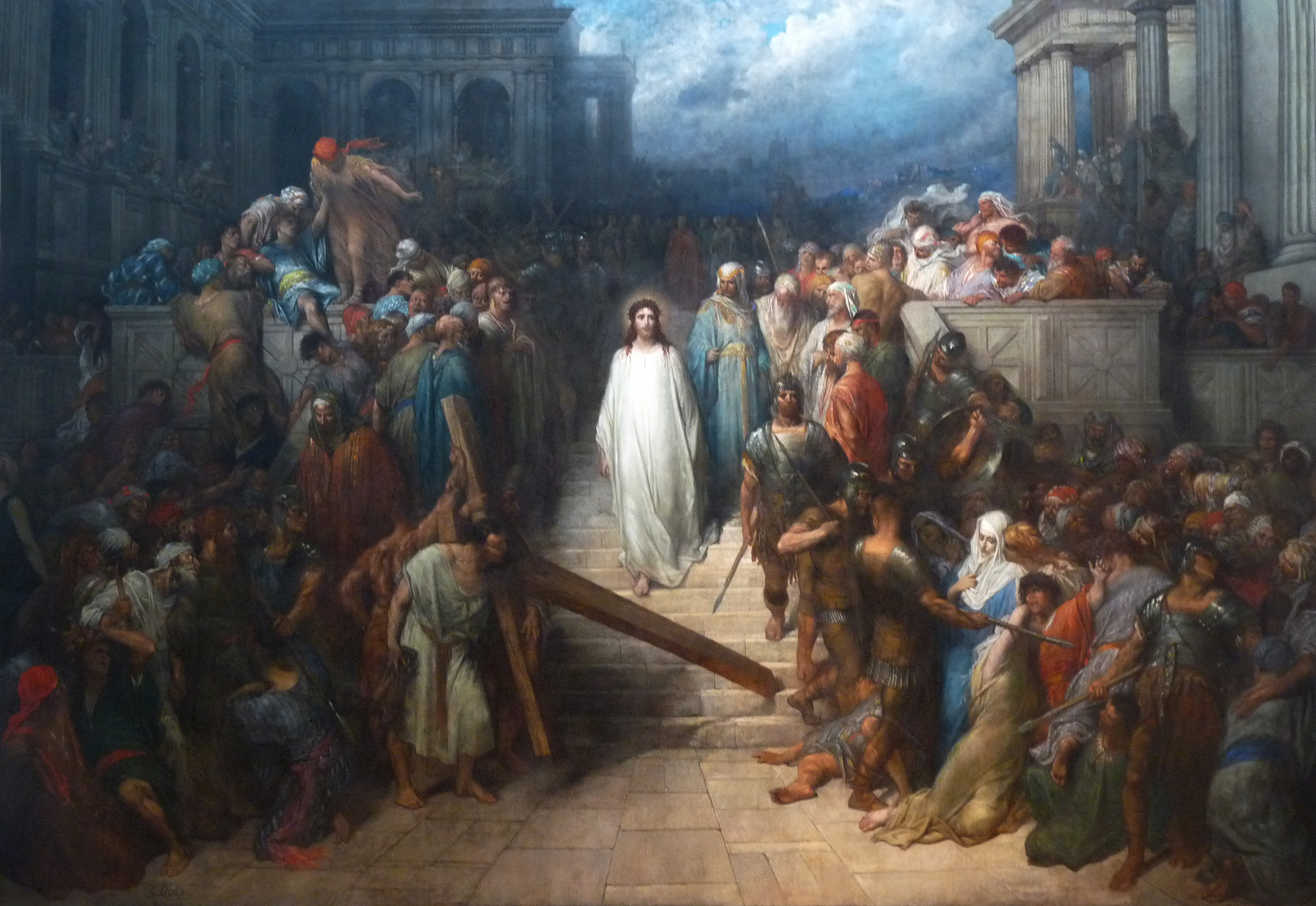
Gustave Doré, Le Christ quittant le prétoire

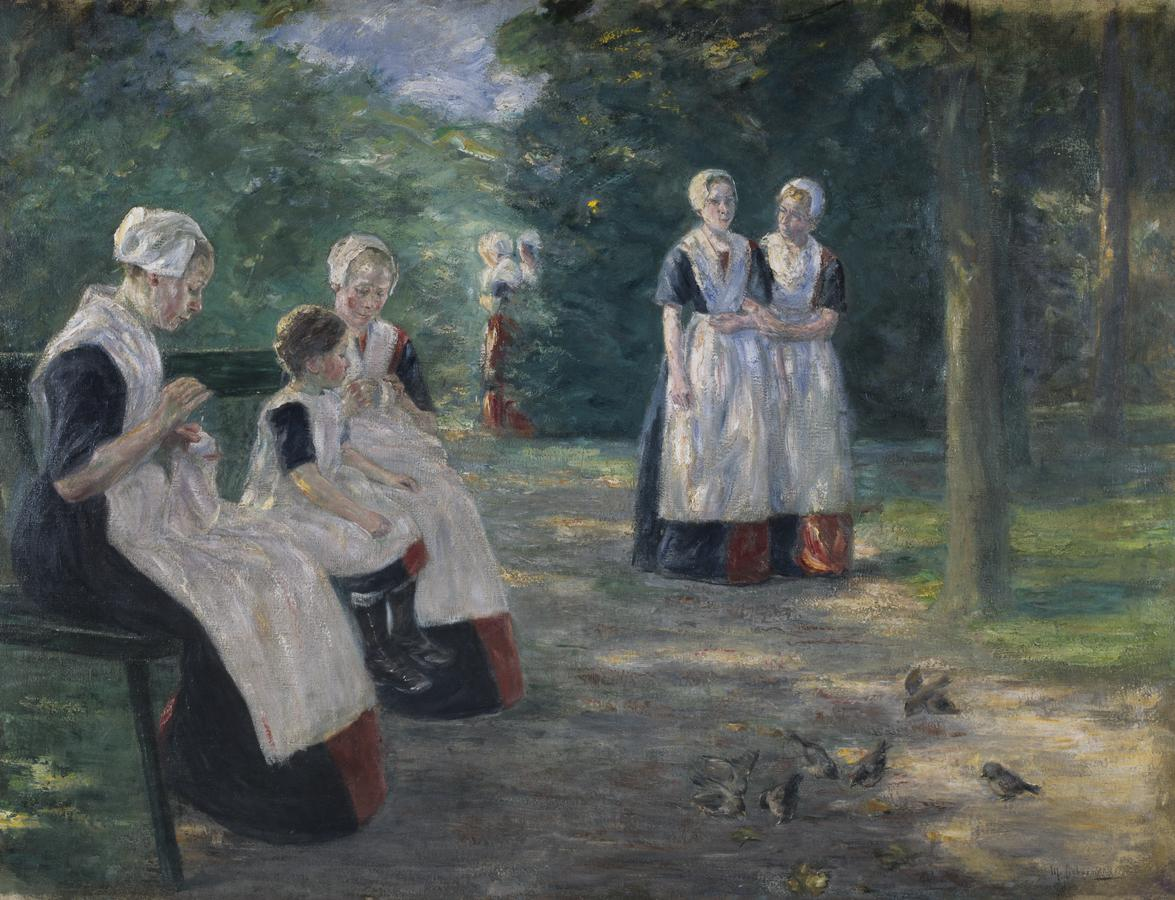
Max Liebermann, Garden of the Orphanage in Amsterdam

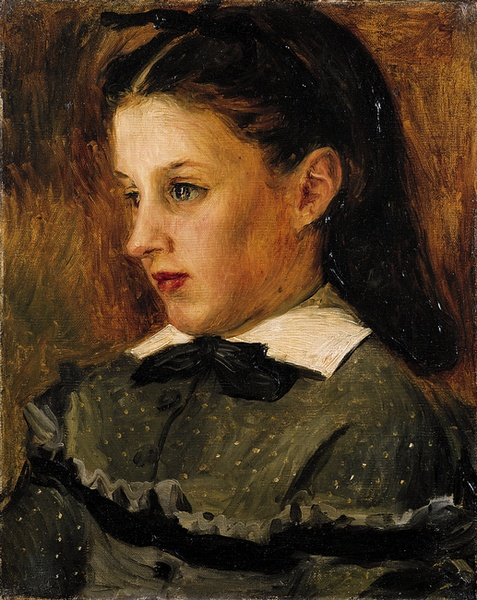
Pierre-Auguste Renoir, Portrait de Marie Le Cœur

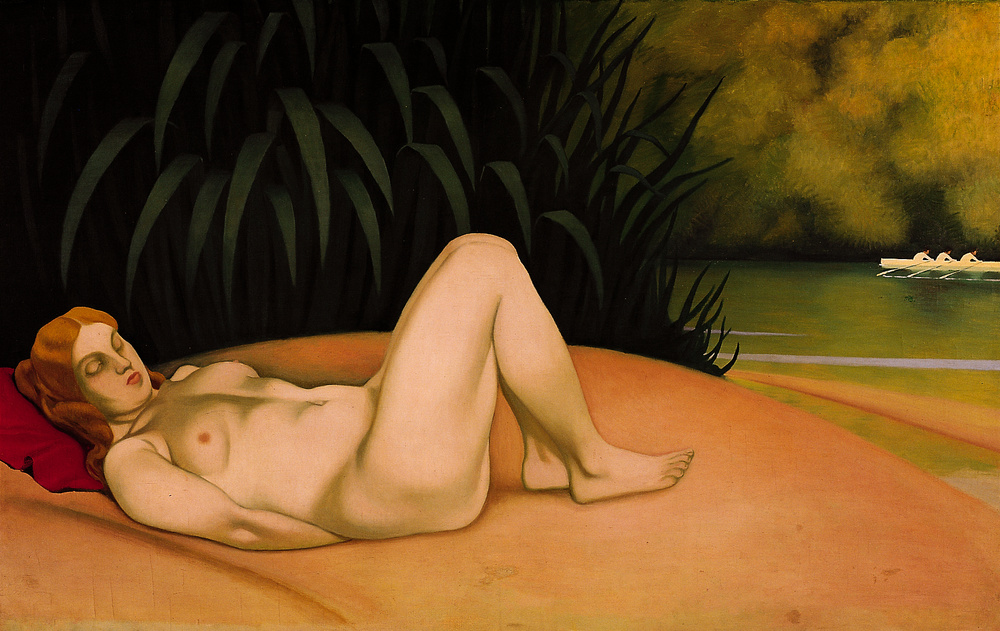
Félix Vallotton, Femme nue dormant au bord de l'eau

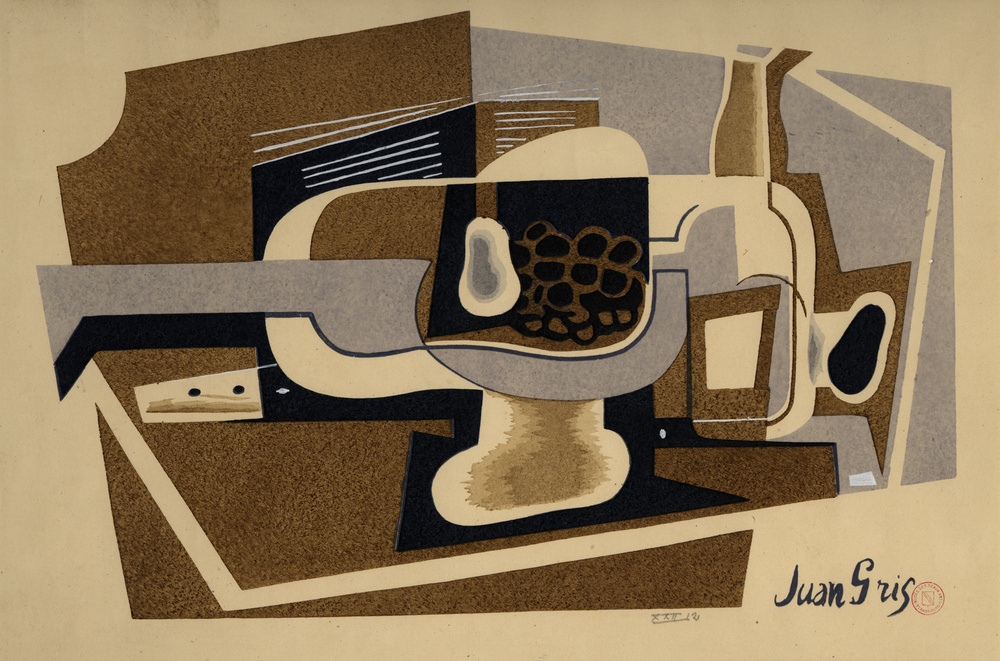
Juan Gris, Still life

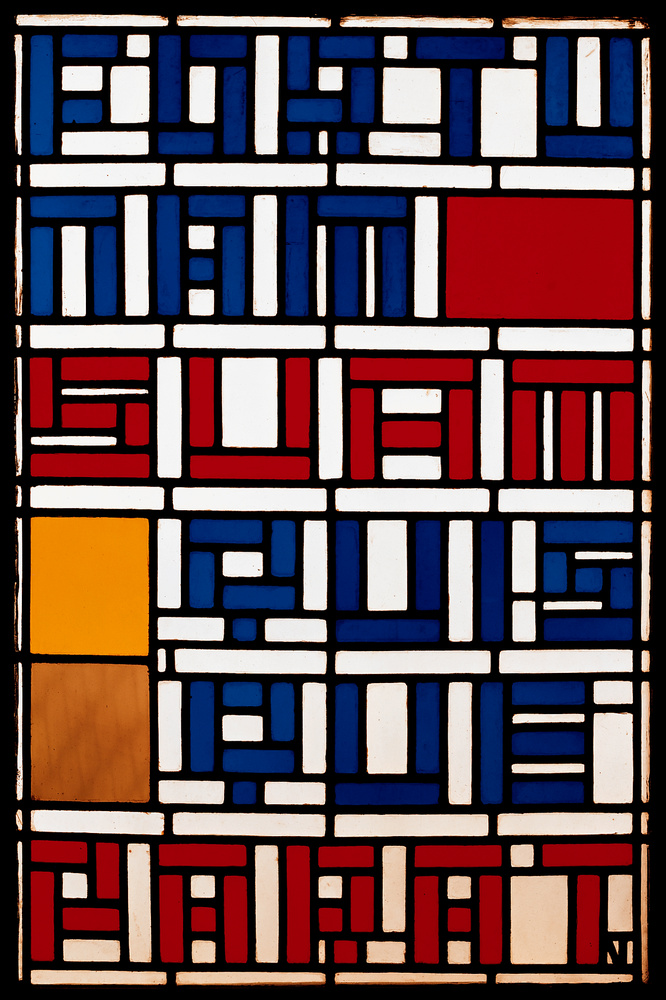
Theo van Doesburg, Fortunam suam quisque parat

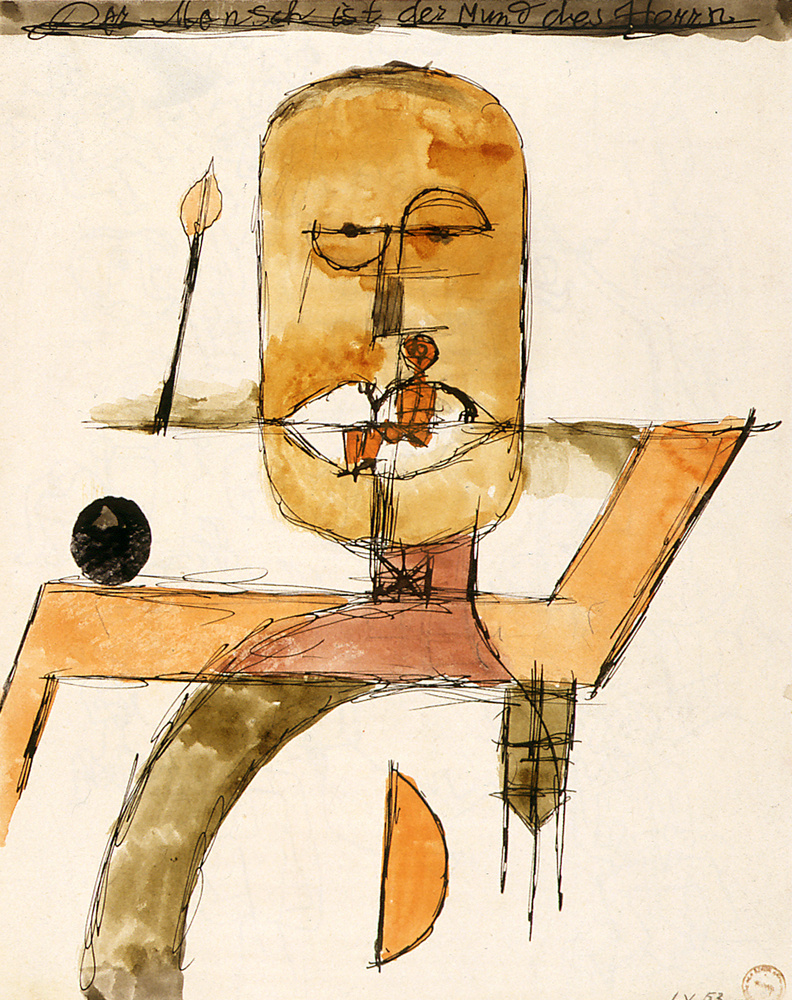
Paul Klee, Der Mensch ist der Mund des Herrn (Man is the Mouth of the Lord)

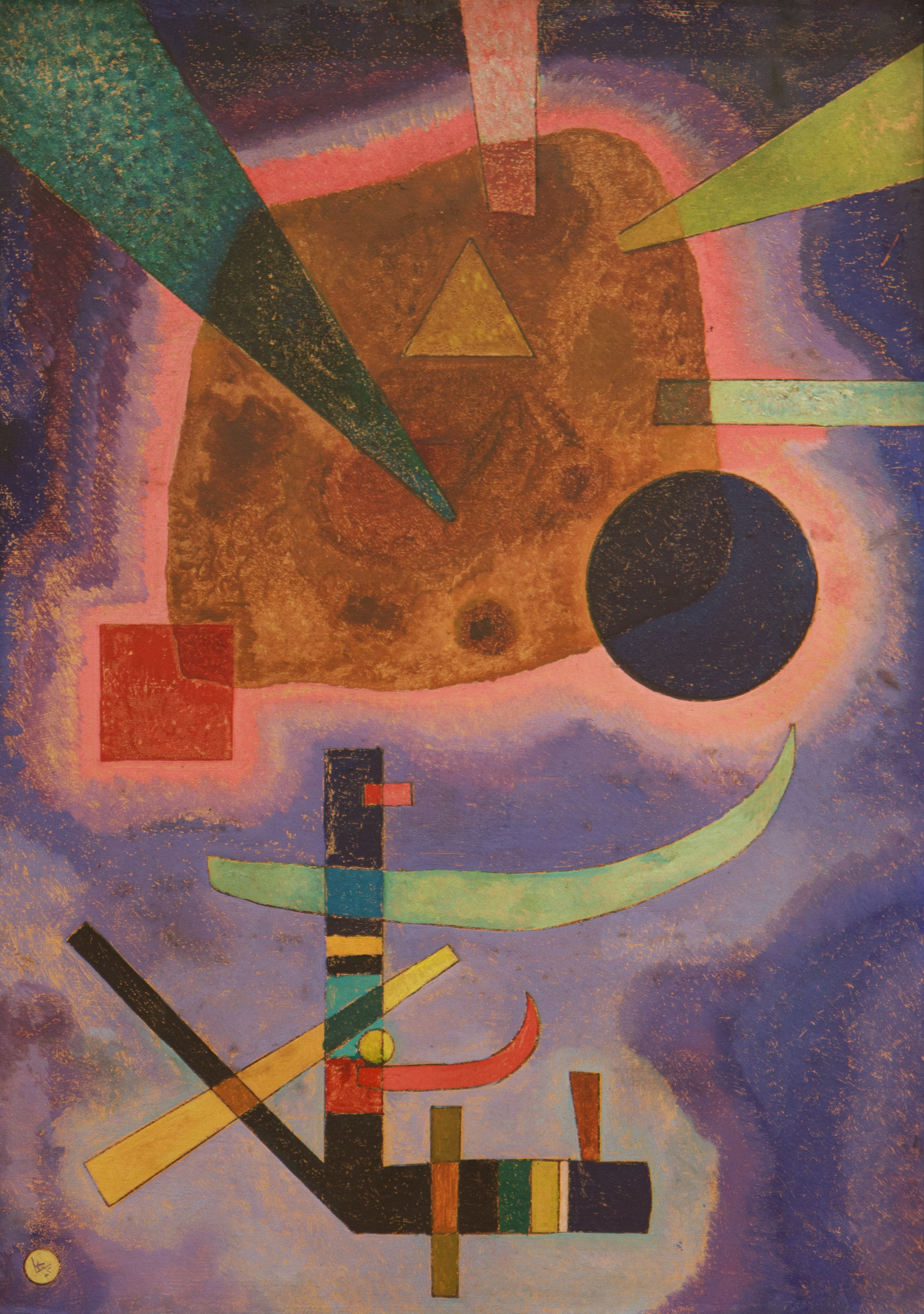
Wassily Kandinsky, Three Elements

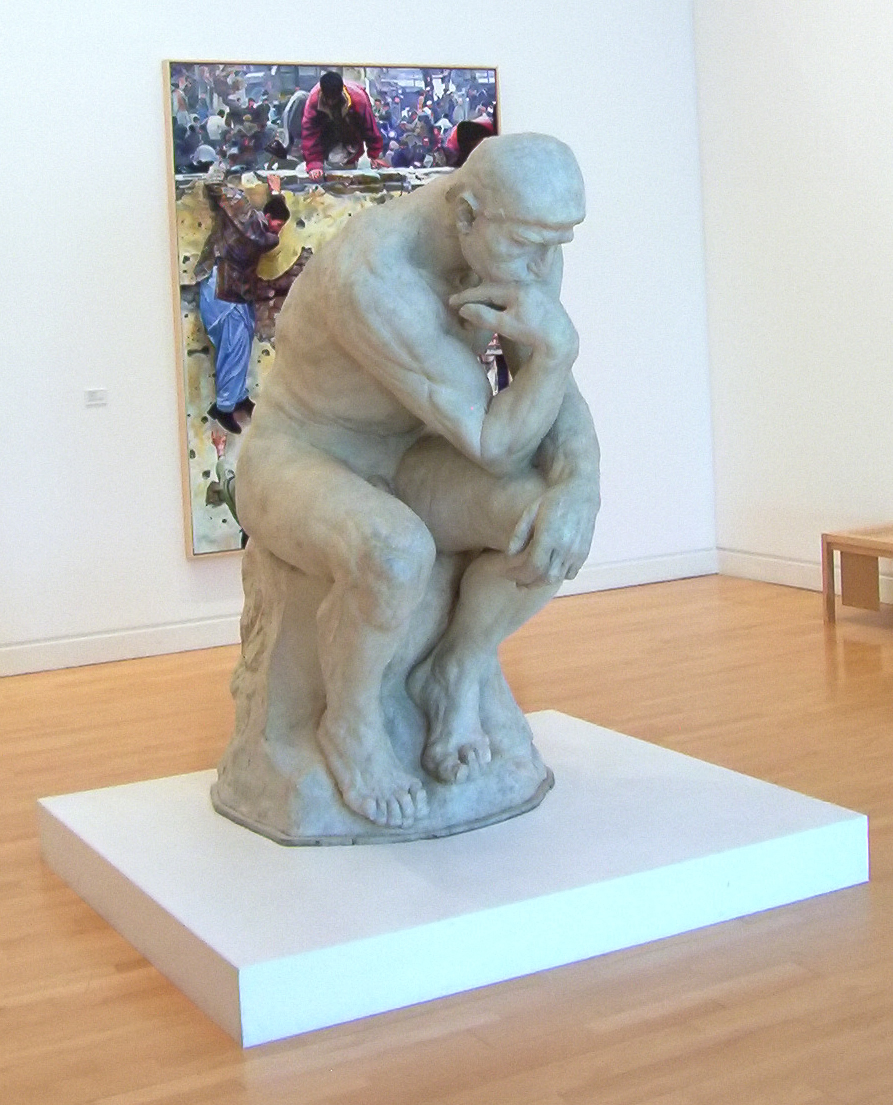
Auguste Rodin, The Thinker (and behind: Malcolm Morley, Wall Jumpers)

== Literature ==
- Les collections du Musée d'art moderne et contemporain de la ville de Strasbourg, Éditions des musées de la ville de Strasbourg, February 2008, ISBN 978-2-901833-82-6 in French
- Museum of Modern and Contemporary Art, Éditions des musées de Strasbourg, Strasbourg, 2021, ISBN 9782351251775
