= Wahrlich, wahrlich, ich sage euch, BWV 86 =

Church cantata by Johann Sebastian Bach

Wahrlich, wahrlich, ich sage euch
- BWV 86
- Church cantata by J. S. Bach
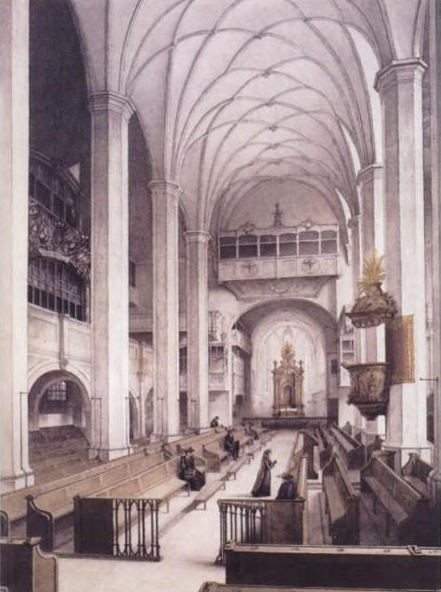
- Thomaskirche, Leipzig
- Occasion: Rogate (fifth Sunday after Easter)
- Bible text: John 16:23
- Chorale: "Kommt her zu mir, spricht Gottes Sohn" by Georg Grünwald; "Es ist das Heil uns kommen her" by Paul Speratus"
- Performed: 14 May 1724: Leipzig
- Movements: 6
- Vocal: solo: alto, tenor and bass; SATB choir
- Instrumental: 2 oboes d'amore; 2 violins; viola; continuo

Wahrlich, wahrlich, ich sage euch (Truly, truly I say to you), BWV 86, is a church cantata by Johann Sebastian Bach. He composed it in Leipzig for Rogate, the fifth Sunday after Easter, and first performed it on 14 May 1724.

An unknown poet began the text with a quotation from the Farewell Discourse of Jesus. He used a stanza of Georg Grünwald's hymn "Kommt her zu mir, spricht Gottes Sohn" in movement 3 and as the closing chorale a stanza from "Es ist das Heil uns kommen her" by Paul Speratus (1524). Bach structured the cantata in six movements, a gospel quotation in the beginning, chorales as movements 3 and 6, otherwise recitatives and arias. He scored it for three vocal soloists, a four-part choir and a Baroque instrumental ensemble of two oboes d'amore, strings and continuo.

== History and words ==
Bach composed the cantata in Leipzig in his first annual cycle as Thomaskantor for the Fifth Sunday after Easter, called Rogate. The prescribed readings for the Sunday were from the Epistle of James, "doers of the word, not only listeners" (James 1:22–27) and from the Gospel of John, from the Farewell Discourses of Jesus, prayers will be fulfilled (John 16:23–30). The theme of the cantata is a quotation from the gospel at the beginning, the promise of Jesus "Verily, verily, I say unto you, whatsoever ye shall ask the Father in my name, he will give you". An unknown poet used as movement 3 the 16th stanza of Georg Grünwald hymn "Kommt her zu mir, spricht Gottes Sohn" (1530), and as the closing chorale the eleventh stanza of "Es ist das Heil uns kommen her" by Paul Speratus (1524). The poet hints at the question how the promise can be understood looking at the reality of life. In movement 2 he uses the image of a rose with thorns to illustrate two conflicting aspects. In movements 3 and 4 he confirms the promise which has to be seen in the perspective of time. Movement 5 refers to the waiting for a promise being kept, and the closing chorale assures that God knows the right time. The structure of the six movements – a gospel quotation in the beginning, chorales as movements 3 and 6, the sequence of recitative and arias – is similar to Wo gehest du hin? BWV 166, first performed one week earlier.

Bach first performed the cantata on 14 May 1724.

== Music ==
=== Structure and scoring ===
Bach structured the cantata in six movements, beginning with a biblical quotation for the vox Christi, Jesus speaking. An aria is followed by a chorale for the soprano, a set of recitative and aria, and the closing chorale, the only movement for choir. Bach scored the work for three vocal soloists (alto, tenor, bass), a four-part choir and a Baroque instrumental ensemble of two oboes d'amore (Oa), two violins (Vl), viola (Va) and basso continuo.

In the following table of the movements, the scoring follows the Neue Bach-Ausgabe. The keys and time signatures are taken from Alfred Dürr, using the symbol for common time (4/4). The continuo, playing throughout, is not shown.

Movements of Wahrlich, wahrlich, ich sage euch
No.	Title	Text	Type	Vocal	Oboe	Strings	Key	Time
1	Wahrlich, wahrlich, ich sage euch	John 16:23	Aria	B		2Vl Va	E major	common time
2	Ich will doch wohl Rosen brechen	anon.	Aria	A		Vl	A major	3/4
3	Und was der ewig gütig Gott	Grünwald	Chorale	S	2Oa		F-sharp minor	common time
4	Gott macht es nicht gleichwie die Welt	anon.	Recitative	T				common time
5	Gott hilft gewiß	anon.	Aria	T		2Vl Va	E major	common time
6	Die Hoffnung wart' der rechten Zeit	Speratus	Chorale	SATB	(2Oa)	(2Vl Va)		common time

=== Movements ===
==== 1 ====
The gospel quotation, "Wahrlich, wahrlich, ich sage euch, so ihr den Vater etwas bitten werdet in meinem Namen, so wird er's euch geben." (Truly, truly I say to you, whatever you ask of the Father in My name, so will it be given to you.), is given to the bass as the vox Christi, the voice of Jesus. The instruments, strings probably doubled by oboe d'amore, introduce vocal motifs which the voice picks up. The bass sings the text three times, while the instruments continue playing the same motifs. Julian Mincham observes: "The richness of the text, the unobtrusive nature of the melodic ideas and the gently flowing rhythms combine to create an appropriate atmosphere of dignified restraint".

==== 2 ====
In the alto aria, "Ich will doch wohl Rosen brechen" (I will yet indeed pluck roses), the voice is accompanied by the strings and a violin obbligato in virtuoso figuration, which may illustrate the heavenly light promised as the final fulfillment. John Eliot Gardiner, who conducted the Bach Cantata Pilgrimage in 2000, interprets the solo violin's motif as an image of plucking a rose, and notes that the solo violin is silent when fulfillment is reached ("For He has pledged His word").

==== 3 ====
In the chorale, "Und was der ewig gültig Gott in seinem Wort versprochen hat" (And whatever the eternally merciful God has promised with His word), the unadorned cantus firmus in the soprano is embedded in a trio of the two oboes d'amore and the continuo. Gardiner suggests that the oboes' music may illustrate the "stratospheric circling of the angelic host" which the hymn text refers to.

==== 4 ====
In a short tenor recitative for tenor, "Gott macht es nicht gleichwie die Welt, die viel verspricht und wenig hält" (God does not do as the world does, that promises much and upholds little), the musicologist Julian Mincham notes "a moment of harsh severity in the melody at the mention of the world′s failings".

==== 5 ====
In the tenor aria, "Gott hilft gewiß; wird gleich die Hilfe aufgeschoben" (God helps indeed; even if that help is delayed), a motif on the first line is introduced by the violin, repeated by the voice, and repeated several times.

==== 6 ====
The closing chorale, "Die Hoffnung wart' der rechten Zeit" (Hope awaits the right time), is set for four parts.

== Recordings ==
The selection is taken from the listing on the Bach Cantatas Website. Choirs with one voice per part (OVPP) and instrumental groups playing period instruments in historically informed performances are markeded green.

=== Complete cycles ===
Recordings of Complete cycles
Title	Conductor / Choir / Orchestra	Soloists	Label	Year	Choir type	Instr.
J. S. Bach: Das Kantatenwerk • Complete Cantatas • Les Cantates, Folge / Vol. 5	Nikolaus Harnoncourt Tölzer Knabenchor Concentus Musicus Wien	soloist of the Tölzer Knabenchor; Paul Esswood; Kurt Equiluz; Ruud van der Meer	Teldec	1979		Period
Die Bach Kantate Vol. 34	Helmuth Rilling Gächinger Kantorei Bach-Collegium Stuttgart	Arleen Augér; Helen Watts; Adalbert Kraus; Walter Heldwein	Hänssler	1979		
J. S. Bach: Complete Cantatas Vol. 9	Ton Koopman Amsterdam Baroque Orchestra & Choir	Sibylla Rubens; Bernhard Landauer; Christoph Prégardien; Klaus Mertens	Antoine Marchand	1998		Period
Bach Cantatas Vol. 25: Altenburg/Warwick	John Eliot Gardiner Monteverdi Choir English Baroque Soloists	Katharine Fuge; Robin Tyson; Steve Davisilim; Stephan Loges	Soli Deo Gloria	2000		Period
J. S. Bach: Cantatas Vol. 19 – (Cantatas from Leipzig 1724)	Masaaki Suzuki Bach Collegium Japan	Yukari Nonoshita; Robin Blaze; Makoto Sakurada; Stephan MacLeod	BIS	2001		Period
J. S. Bach: Cantatas Bwv 108, 86, 11, 44	Sigiswald Kuijken La Petite Bande	Siri Thornhill; Petra Noskaiová; Christoph Genz; Jan van der Crabben	Accent	2010	OVPP	Period
