= Grunwald =

Grunwald may refer to:

== Places ==
=== Administrative ===
- Grunwald, Warmian-Masurian Voivodeship, a village in northern Poland
  - Gmina Grunwald, a municipality containing the village of Grunwald
- Grunwald, Poznań, a district of the city of Poznań in western Poland
- Grunwald, Łódź Voivodeship, a village in central Poland

=== Non-administrative ===
- Grunwald Monument (Pomnik Grunwaldzki), erected in 1910 in Kraków, Poland
- Grunwald Monument, Ivano-Frankivsk (Pomnik Grunwaldzki), erected in 1910 in Stanisławów (present-day Ivano-Frankivsk, Ukraine)
- Grunwald Square, Warsaw, an urban square in Warsaw, Poland
- Grunwald, a sanatorium in Sokołowsko, Poland
- Grunwaldzka street in Bydgoszcz

== Sports ==
- Grunwald Poznań (sports club), a sports club with many different sections including:
  - Grunwald Poznań (field hockey)
  - Grunwald Poznań (football)
  - Grunwald Poznań (handball)
- Grunwald Wilno, the Polish name for a Lithuanian football club

== Other uses ==
- Grunwald (surname)
- Battle of Grunwald, a decisive battle fought in 1410 in what is now northern Poland

== See also ==
- Greenwald (disambiguation)
- Žalgiris (disambiguation)
- Grunewald (disambiguation)
- Grünwald (disambiguation)
