= Groenewold =

Groenewold is a surname. Notable people with the surname include:

- Hilbrand J. Groenewold (1910–1996), Dutch theoretical physicist
- Ilka Groenewold (born 1985), German television presenter and athlete
- Renate Groenewold (born 1976), Dutch speed skater and cyclist

== See also ==
- Groenewald
