= Grunwald (surname) =

Grunwald is a surname. Notable people with the surname include:

- Al Grunwald (1930–2011), American baseball player
- Anatole de Grunwald (1910–1967), Russian-born British film producer and screenwriter
- Ash Grunwald (born 1976), Australian blues singer
- Dimitri de Grunwald (1914–1990), Russian-born British film producer
- Ernest Grunwald (1923–2002), German-born American chemist
- Ernie Grunwald (born 1970), Canadian actor
- Glen Grunwald (born 1958), Canadian attorney and basketball executive
- Henry Grunwald (barrister), British lawyer
- Henry A. Grunwald (1922–2005), American journalist and diplomat
- Jonathan Grunwald (born 1983), German politician
- Lisa Grunwald (born 1959), American author
- Mandy Grunwald (born 1957), American Demorat political consultant
- Michael Grunwald (born 1970), American journalist and author
- Moritz Grünwald (1853–1895), Bulgarian chief rabbi
- Morten Grunwald (1934–2018), Danish actor, stage director and theatre manager
- Peter Grunwald, American film producer
- Wilhelm Grunwald (1909–1989), German mathematician

== See also ==
- Greenwald (disambiguation)
