= Grunewald =

Grunewald is the name of both a locality and a forest in Germany:

- Grunewald (forest)
- Grunewald (locality)

Grünewald may refer to:

- Grünewald (surname)
- Grünewald, Germany, a municipality in Brandenburg, Germany
- Grünewald (Luxembourg), a forest in Luxembourg
- Matthias-Grünewald-Verlag, a publishing house in Mainz

== See also ==
- Greenwald (disambiguation)
- Grindelwald (disambiguation)
- Grünwald (disambiguation)
- Grunwald (disambiguation)
