= Groenewald =

Groenewald is a surname that originated in Holland, Netherland. This surname dates all the way back from the 1500s. It is mostly in South Africa. Notable people with the surname include:

- Boetie Groenewald (born 1990), South African rugby union player
- Brendon Groenewald (born 1991), South African rugby union player
- Craig Groenewald, South African paralympic swimmer
- Dawie Groenewald, South African game hunter and convicted wildlife smuggler
- Evert Groenewald, South African military personnel
- Lambert Groenewald (born 1989), South African-born Zimbabwean rugby union player
- Maryka Groenewald, Australian politician
- Pieter Groenewald, South African politician
- Tim Groenewald (born 1984), South African cricketer
- Vaughn Groenewald (born 1974), South African golfer
- Zhivago Groenewald (born 1993), Namibian cricketer

== See also ==
- Greenwald (disambiguation)
- Grünewald
