= Greenwald =

Greenwald is a surname. Notable people with the surname include:

- Alex Greenwald (born 1979), American musician and actor
- Amelia Greenwald (1881–1966), American nurse
- Amy Greenwald, American computer scientist
- Andy Greenwald (born 1977), social commentator, specifically about popular music
- Bruce Greenwald (born 1946), American economist
- Douglas Greenwald (1913–1997), American economist
- Glenn Greenwald (born 1967), attorney, journalist, blogger, author of books, NSA critic
- Hank Greenwald (born 1935), former baseball announcer
- Herbert Greenwald (1915–1959), real estate developer associated with Mies van der Rohe
- Jeff Greenwald (born 1954), author, performer, and Executive Director of Ethical Traveler
- Joseph Greenwald (actor) (circa 1878–1938), American actor
- Louis Greenwald (born 1967), New Jersey, USA politician
- Maggie Greenwald (born 1955), American film director and writer
- Michael Greenwald, birth name of Michael Kidd (1915–2007), American film and stage choreographer
- Nora Greenwald (born 1977), also known as Molly Holly, American professional wrestler
- Robert Greenwald (born 1945), American film director, film producer, and political activist
- Rabbi Moshe Greenwald (1853–1911), Rabbi of Chust, Hungary, and author of Arugas Habosem
- Rabbi Eliezer David Greenwald (1867–1928), Rabbi of Satmar, and author of Keren LeDovid
- Rabbi Yaakov Yechezkiya Greenwald (1882–1941), Rabbi of Pápa, Hungary and author of Vayageid Yaakov
- Leopold Greenwald (1888–1955), Rav, Congregation Beth Jacob, Columbus, Ohio
- Rabbi Yosef Greenwald (1903–1984), Grand Rebbe of Pupa and author of Vaychi Yosef
- Rabbi Yaakov Yechezkia Greenwald II (b. 1948), present Grand Rebbe of Pupa, Williamsburg, Brooklyn

== Other uses ==
- Greenwald, Minnesota
- Greenwald, Pennsylvania

== See also ==
- Grunewald (disambiguation)
- Grunwald (disambiguation)
- Grunwald (surname)
- Grünwald (disambiguation)
