= Naked Woman Sleeping by the Water =

Painting by Félix Vallotton

- French: Femme nue dormant au bord de l'eau
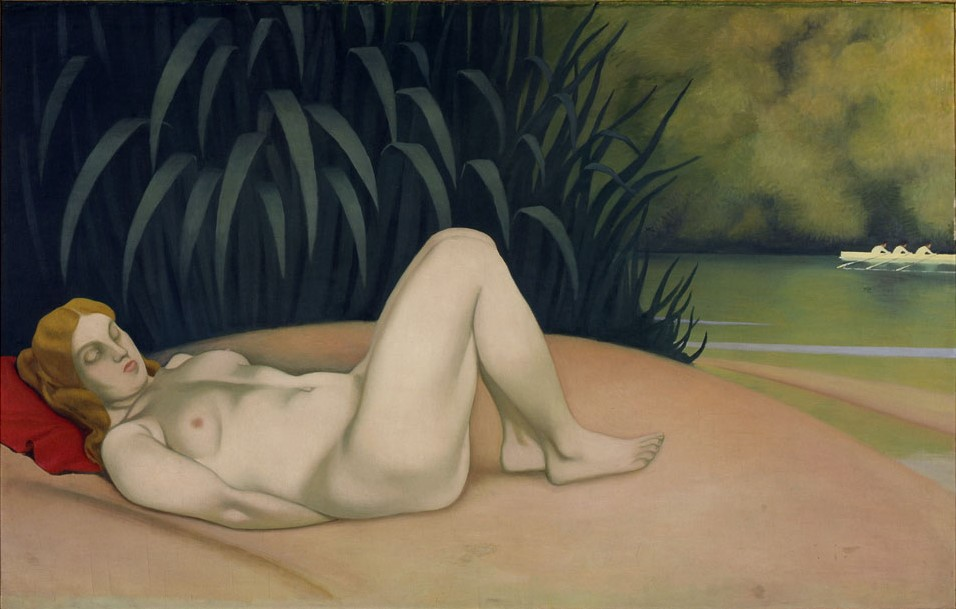
- Artist: Félix Vallotton
- Year: 1921
- Medium: oil paint on canvas
- Movement: Nabis
- Subject: a sleeping nude in a landscape
- Dimensions: 122.5 cm × 192.5 cm (48.2 in × 75.8 in)
- Location: Musée d'Art moderne et contemporain, Strasbourg
- Accession: 1926

Naked Woman Sleeping by the Water (French: Femme nue dormant au bord de l'eau) is an oil on canvas painting by the Swiss and French artist Félix Vallotton, from 1926. It was given to the Strasbourg museum by Vallotton's widow in 1926 and is now in the Strasbourg Museum of Modern and Contemporary Art. Its inventory number is 55.974.0.879.

The woman's body, with its greenish shadows and uncomfortable posture, is deliberately depicted in an anti-naturalistic manner. The three rowing men on the right edge of the painting are supposed to be the products of the woman's dream. In any case, their movement and activity contrast with the sleeper's indolence and inertia.
