= The Garden of the Orphanage in Amsterdam =

Painting by Max Liebermann

- German: Der Garten des Waisenhauses in Amsterdam
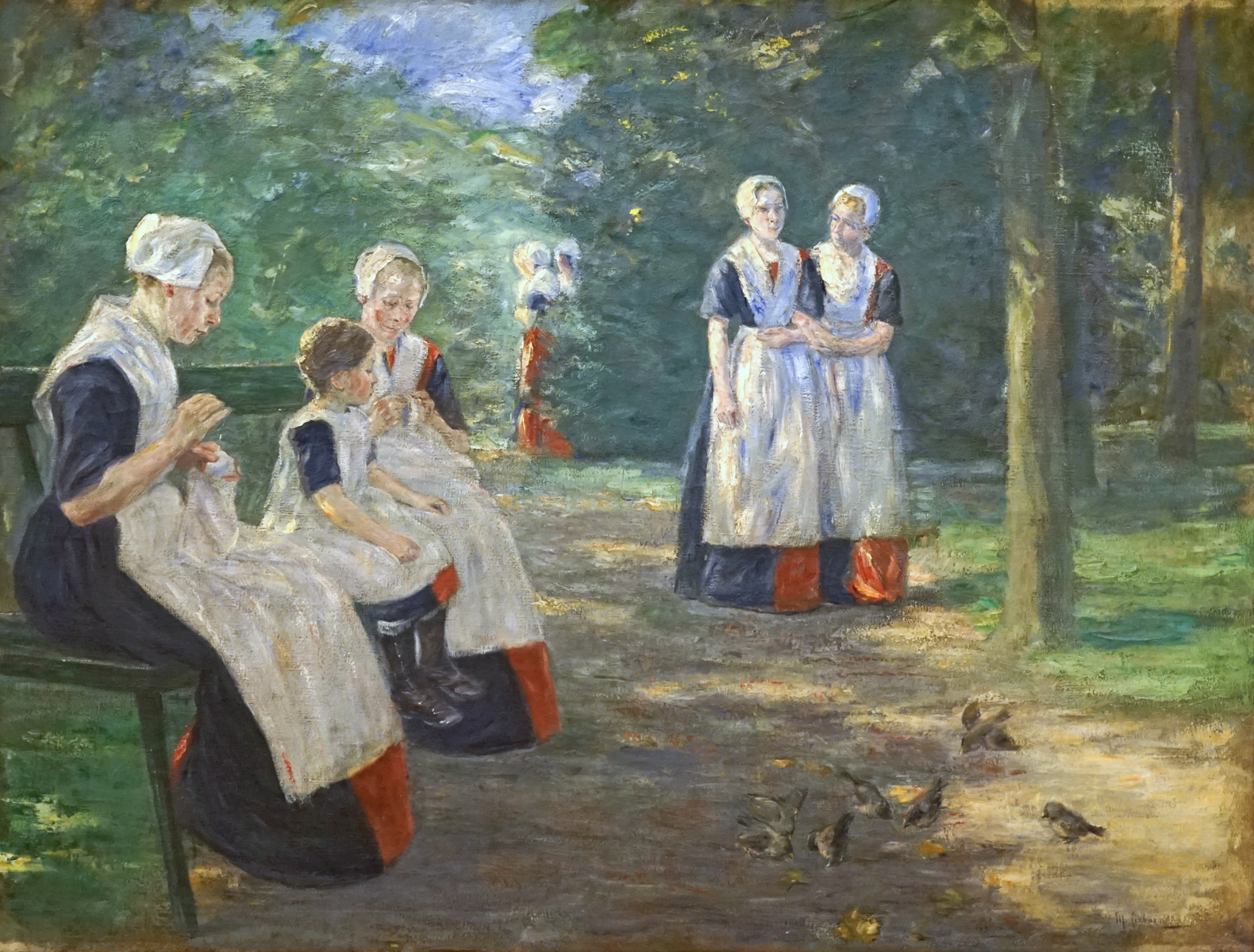
- Artist: Max Liebermann
- Year: 1894
- Medium: oil painting on canvas
- Movement: Impressionism; Post-Impressionism; Realism
- Subject: Dutch girls in the garden of the municipal orphanage of Amsterdam
- Dimensions: 117 cm × 152.5 cm (46 in × 60.0 in)
- Location: Musée d'Art moderne et contemporain, Strasbourg

The Garden of the Orphanage in Amsterdam is an 1894 painting by German painter Max Liebermann, a figure of Realism, Impressionism, and Post-Impressionism. It is now in the Musée d'Art moderne et contemporain of Strasbourg, France. Its inventory number is 55.974.0.680.

The painting was bought by the museum's director, Wilhelm von Bode, in the very year of its completion. It is the last in a series of works depicting scenes from the Amsterdam orphanage, begun in 1876 with a series of drawings in situ and culminating in several oil paintings, the largest of which are now in the Städel Museum of Frankfurt (1882), the Kunsthalle of Hamburg (1885), and the Strasbourg museum.
