= Still Life (Braque, 1911) =

Painting by Georges Braque

- French: Nature morte
- Artist: Georges Braque
- Year: 1911
- Medium: oil paint on canvas
- Movement: Cubism
- Subject: still life (a glass and a guitar)
- Dimensions: 33 cm × 41 cm (13 in × 16 in)
- Location: Musée d'Art moderne et contemporain, Strasbourg
- Accession: 1923

Still Life, also referred to as Glass and Guitar (French: Verre à pied et guitare), is a 1911 oil painting by the French artist Georges Braque, now in the Strasbourg Museum of Modern and Contemporary Art (inventory number 55.974.0.720). It was the first cubist painting ever bought by a public collection of France.

Still Life had belonged to Daniel-Henry Kahnweiler until 1921, when his collection was confiscated by the French government, and sold. The architect and designer Pierre Chareau bought the painting and sold it two years later to the Strasbourg museum.
