= Champ d'avoine aux coquelicots =

1890 painting by Claude Monet

- English: Oat Field with Red Poppies
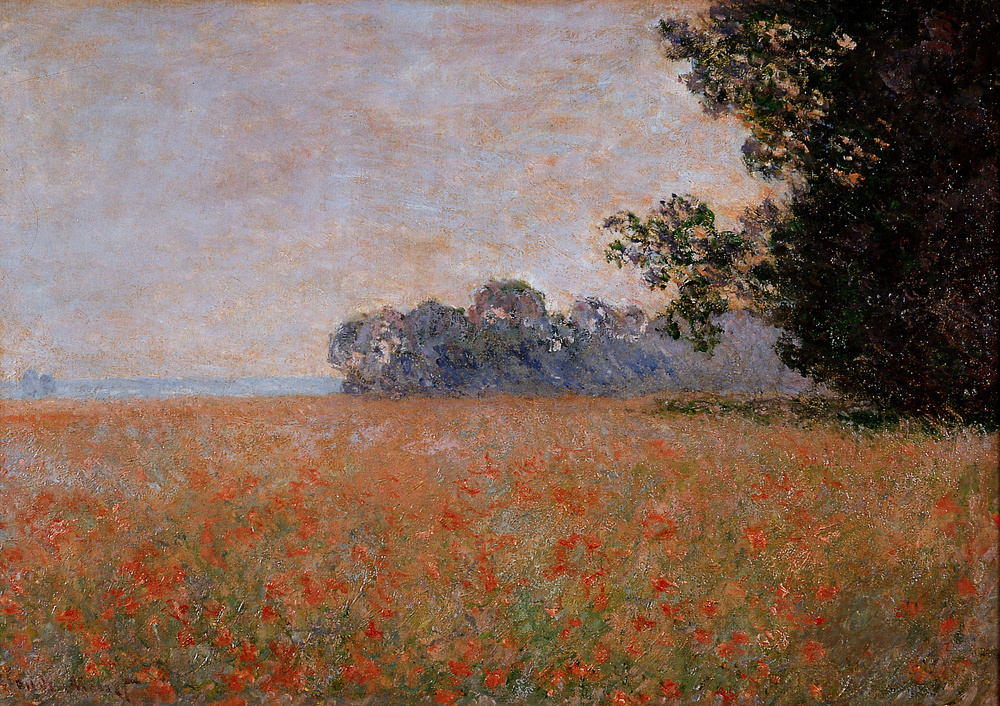
- Artist: Claude Monet
- Year: 1890
- Catalogue: W.1258
- Medium: oil painting on canvas
- Movement: Impressionism; Landscape painting
- Subject: An oat field with red poppy near Giverny
- Dimensions: 65 cm × 92 cm (26 in × 36 in)
- Location: Musée d'Art moderne et contemporain, Strasbourg
- Accession: 1948

Champ d'avoine aux coquelicots is an 1890 landscape painting by the French Impressionist Claude Monet. It is now on display in the Musée d'Art moderne et contemporain of Strasbourg, France. Its inventory number is 55.974.0.683.

Champ d'avoine aux coquelicots belongs to a series of five views of fields around Giverny painted in the summer of 1890. It was bought for the museum in 1948. It was one of several works bought with the insurance money from the disastrous 1947 fire of the Musée des Beaux-Arts.

== See also ==
- List of paintings by Claude Monet
