= Nun freue dich, du Christenheit =

Catholic hymn for Easter

- German Catholic Easter hymn
- English: Now be joyful, you Christendom
- Language: German
- Published: 1975

"Nun freue dich, du Christenheit" (Now be joyful, you Christendom) is a Catholic hymn for Easter. It goes back to a 1390 hymn, which later appeared as "Freu dich, du werte Christenheit". The final version appeared first in the Catholic hymnal Gotteslob of 1975, later in several regional sections of the Gotteslob.

== History ==
The current hymn goes back to around 1390, when a Ein Mainzer Prozessionale (A Mainz processional, meaning a book of processional hymns) has a chant with the incipit "Disse oisterliche dage" (These Easter days). The five stanzas appear as verses of the Marian antiphon "Regina celi letare". A Breslau manuscript from 1478 lists three stanzas which are related to three stanzas of the Mainz source (1,2,5) but in reverse order, now beginning "Frew dich, alle Christenheit" (Be joyful, all Christendom).

The hymn, now "Freu dich, du werte Christenheit", became part of the Einheitslieder of 1947, in an attempt to unify Catholic hymn singing in German. The current text, finally "Nun freue dich, du Christenheit", was adapted for the first common Catholic hymnal, the Gotteslob of 1975, which had the hymn in its common section. The following edition Gotteslob of 2013 has it no longer in the common section, but in 19 of the 24 regional sections. The Diocese of Mainz has it as GL 817.

== Melody ==
The melody of "Freu dich, du werte Christenheit", and "Nun freue dich, du Christenheit" appeared in Mainz around in 1410. It was later used also for "Es ist das Heil uns kommen her".
