= Leopold Greenwald =

Leopold Greenwald (1888–1955), also known as "Yekuthiel Yehuda" Greenwald, was an Orthodox rabbi. Born in Transylvania, he emigrated with his family to the United States in 1924. For nearly thirty years he was the rabbi at Beth Jacob Congregation of Columbus, Ohio. He wrote some forty works, most notably Kol Bo Al Aveilut, a halachic compendium and digest on laws of death and mourning.

== See also ==
- Bereavement in Judaism
