= Niklaus Grunwald =

American biologist and plant pathologist

Niklaus J. Grünwald
- Born: Caracas, Venezuela
- Education: UC Davis
- Scientific career
- Fields: Biology, ecology, plant pathology
- Workplaces: USDA Agricultural Research Service; Oregon State University; Cornell University
- Website: grunwaldlab.cgrb.oregonstate.edu

Niklaus J. Grünwald is a biologist and plant pathologist born and raised in Caracas, Venezuela of German and Swiss ancestry. He is currently a research scientist with the USDA Agricultural Research Service, a Professor (Courtesy) in the Department of Botany and Plant Pathology at Oregon State University, and a Professor (Adjunct) in the Department of Plant Pathology and Plant-Microbe Biology at Cornell University.

== Education ==
Grünwald obtained a BSc in plant science at University of California, Davis (UC Davis) in 1992. He completed his PhD in ecology and plant pathology in 1997 at UC Davis studying the effect of cover crop decomposition on soil nutrient cycling and soil microbiology. He pursued postdoctoral research at Cornell University.

== Research ==
His academic research focuses on the evolution, genomics, and ecology of plant pathogens in the genus Phytophthora and management of the diseases they cause. This pathogen group includes some of the most costly diseases affecting crops and ecosystems. These pathogens have well characterized Effectors to circumvent plant host recognition that in the genus Phytophthora include RxLR, Crinkler and other small secreted proteins. Grünwald is best known for providing novel insights into how plant pathogens emerge, methods to study pathogen evolution, particularly when populations are clonal, and characterizing the evolutionary history of Phytophthora pathogens. In collaboration with one of his students he developed the concept of heat trees to show differential abundance of species (or other hierarchical data like gene expression) in a tree format.

== Honors and awards ==
- 1991 Phi Kappa Phi
- 1992 Summa Cum Laude, UC Davis
- 1992 Outstanding undergraduate performance, Agricultural Science and Management UC Davis
- 1996 Sigma Xi
- 2006 USDA ARS Early Career Award
- 2007 Syngenta Award, American Phytopathological Society
- 2015 Ruth Allen Award, American Phytopathological Society. This award is named after the first female plant pathologist, Ruth F. Allen, and given for outstanding, innovative research contribution that has changed, or has the potential to change, the direction of research in any field of plant pathology.
