= Grünewald (surname) =

Grünewald or Grunewald is a surname. Notable people with the surname include:

- Adam Grünewald (1902–1945), German SS officer and Nazi concentration camp commandant
- Arthur H. Gruenewald (1885-1961), American politician
- Augusto Hamann Rademaker Grünewald (1905–1985), Brazilian admiral and politician
- Evi Grünenwald (born 1964), Swiss chess master
- Gabriele Grunewald (1986–2019), American track-and-field athlete
- Isaac Grünewald (1889–1946), Swedish Modernist painter
- Jakob Grünenwald (1821–1896), German genre painter and illustrator
- Matthias Grünewald (c. 1470–1528), German Renaissance painter
- Olivier Grunewald (born 1959), French photographer and author

== See also ==
- Grünenwald (disambiguation)
