= Grindelwald (disambiguation) =

Grindelwald is a village at the foot of the Wetterhorn in Switzerland.

Grindelwald may also refer to:

- Grindelwald, Tasmania, Australia
- Gellert Grindelwald, a fictional character in the Harry Potter series of books

== See also ==
- Grinderwald, in the Hanover Region and the Lower Saxon district of Nienburg/Weser, Germany
