= Jonathan Grunwald =

German politician (born 1983)

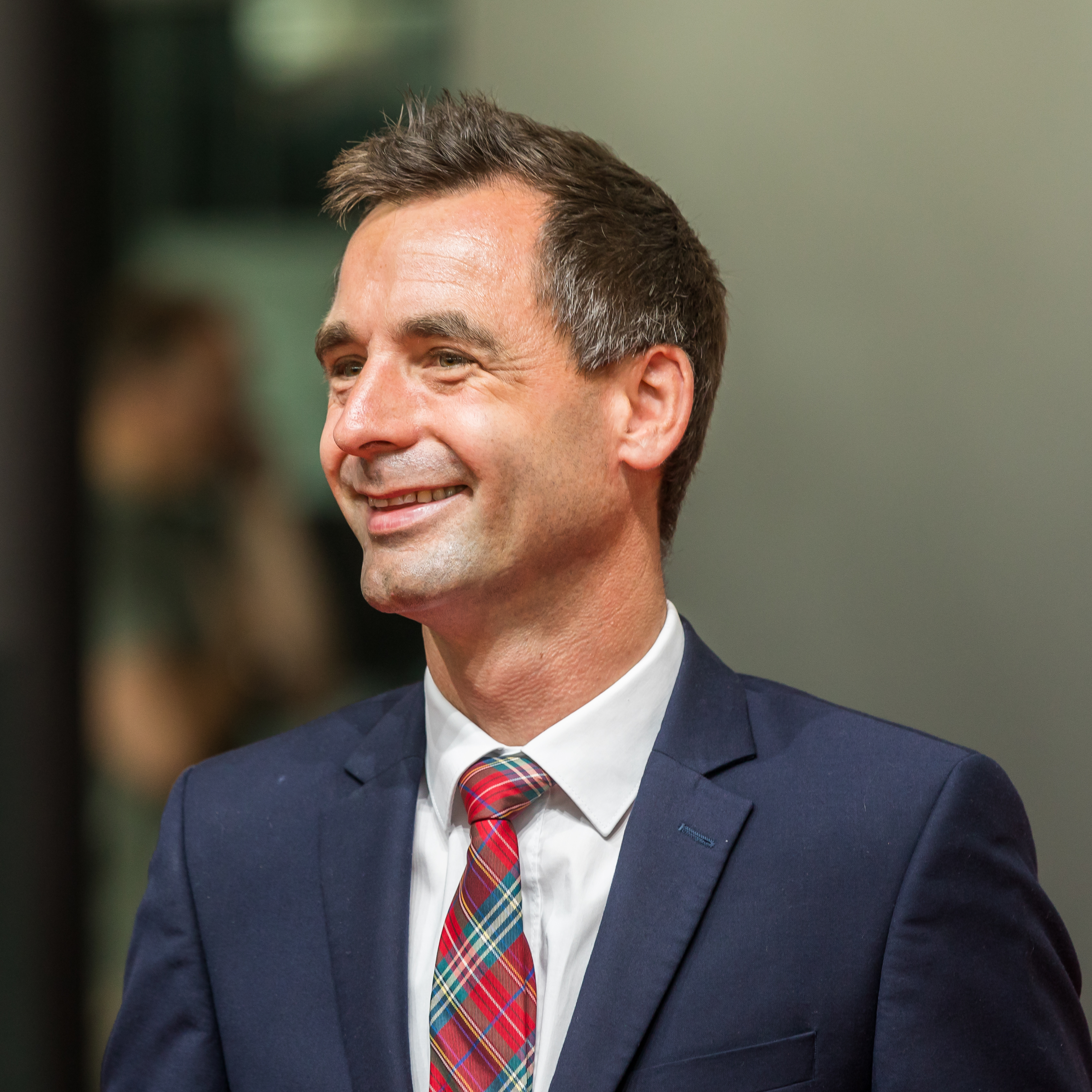
- Grunwald in 2022

Member of the Landtag of North Rhine-Westphalia
- Incumbent
- Assumed office 1 June 2022
- Preceded by: Andrea Milz
- Constituency: Rhein-Sieg-Kreis II

Personal details
- Born: 17 February 1983 (age 43) Bad Godesberg, Bonn, North Rhine-Westphalia, West Germany
- Party: Christian Democratic Union (since 1999)

Jonathan Grunwald (born 17 February 1983) is a German politician serving as a member of the Landtag of North Rhine-Westphalia since 2022. He has served as chairman of the Christian Democratic Union in Bad Honnef since 2021.
