= Jean-Désiré Ringel d'Illzach =

French sculptor

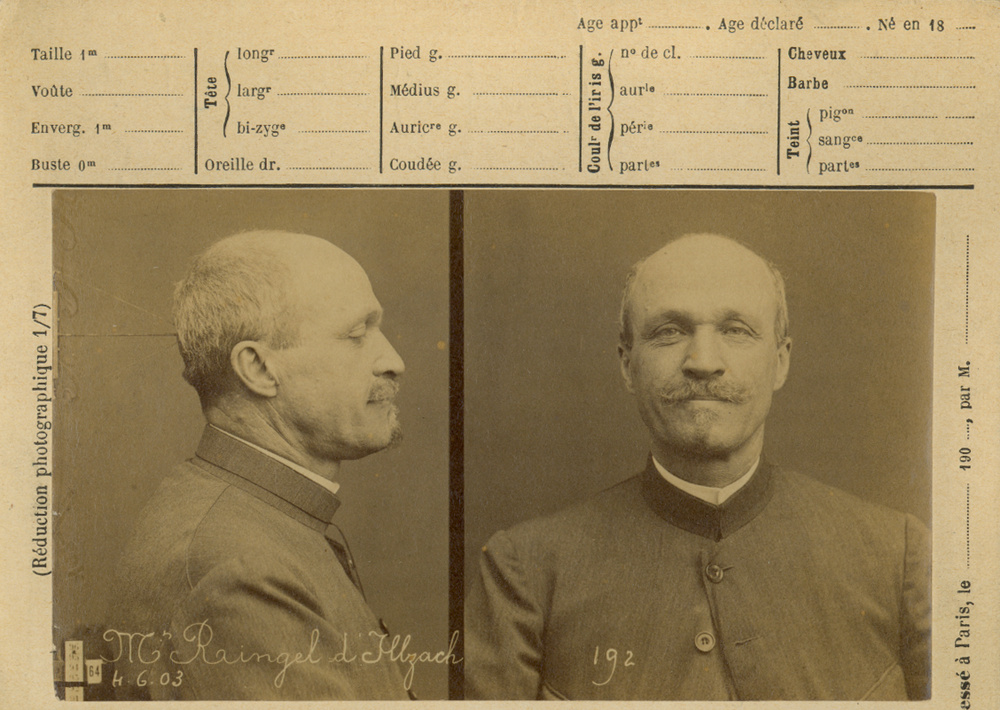
Ringel d'Illzach (1903). Anthropometric photograph by Alphonse Bertillon

Jean-Désiré Ringel, known as Ringel d'Illzach (29 September 1849 in Illzach – 28 July 1916 in Strasbourg) was a French-Alsatian sculptor and engraver.

== Biography ==
He was a pupil of François Jouffroy and Alexandre Falguière at the École des Beaux-arts in Paris and was best known for his medallions, made of diverse materials (bronze, terracotta, stoneware and glass paste), portraying a vast array of the notable artistic, literary, political and scientific figures of his time.

He never ceased to experiment with new processes for casting metals, incorporating new materials and developing ways to apply color. His vitreous enamel agglomerates had the appearance of precious stones with strange tonalities. Some of his masks, such as the one of Maurice Rollinat, are made of multicolored wax. He reproduced all of his works as engravings.

Much of his work was inspired by music, including a series of nine allegorical statues representing the symphonies of Beethoven. A polychrome statue, depicting the Rákóczy March from La damnation de Faust by Hector Berlioz, was the centerpiece of his exhibit at the 1897 Venice Biennial.

Some of its decorative cast-iron work, including masks and highly stylized seahorses, adorn balconies and walls of Hector Guimard's Castel Béranger (1895-1898).

== Selected works ==
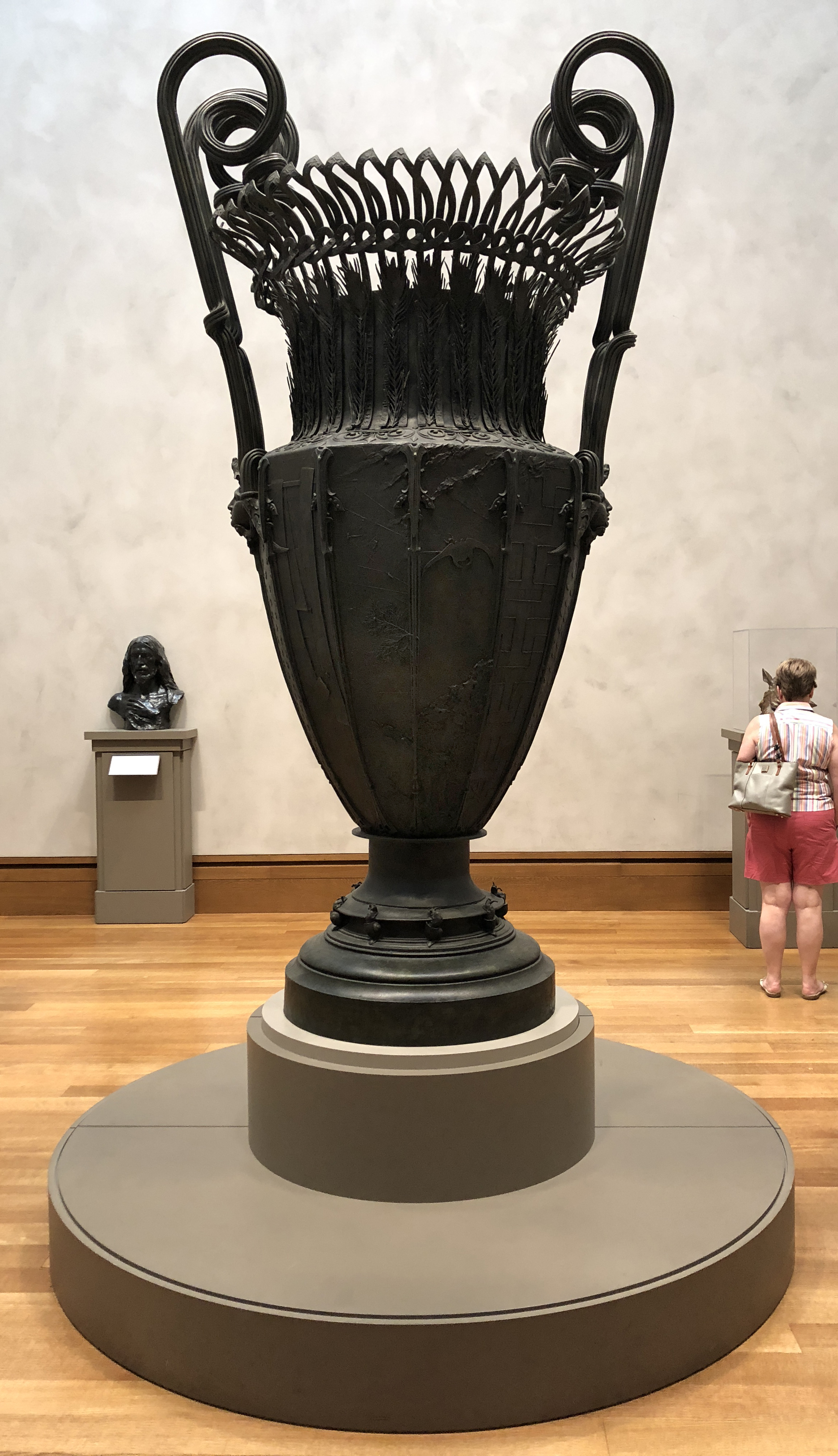
Large Bronze Vase (1889) at Getty Center, Los Angeles

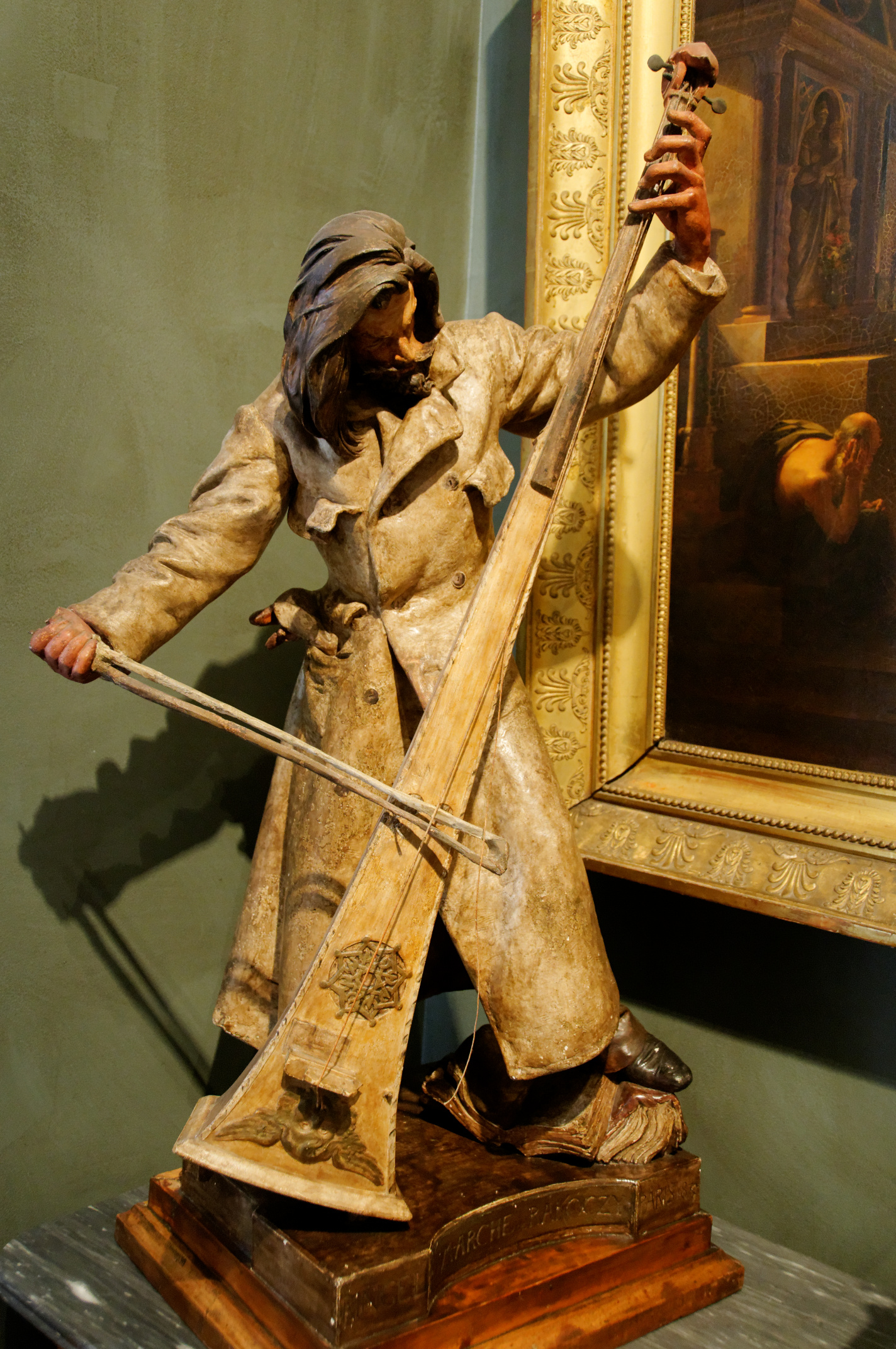
The Rákóczi March (1897)

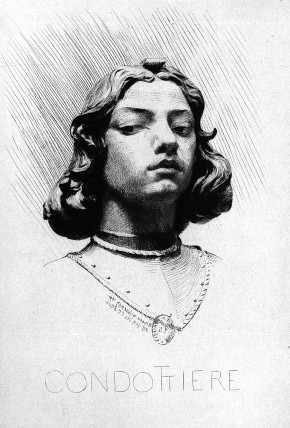
Condottiere (1891)

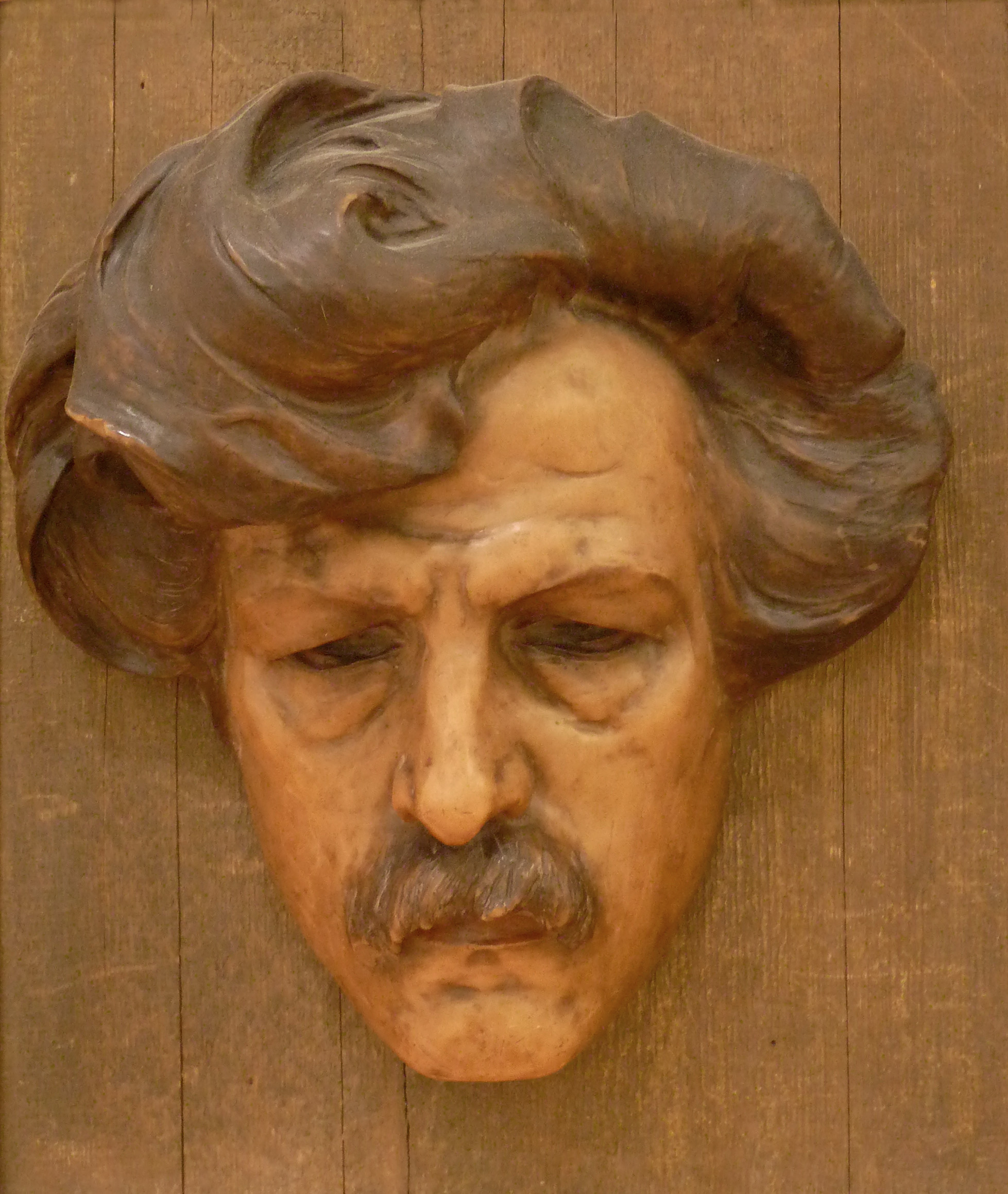
Mask of the Poet Maurice Rollinat (1892)

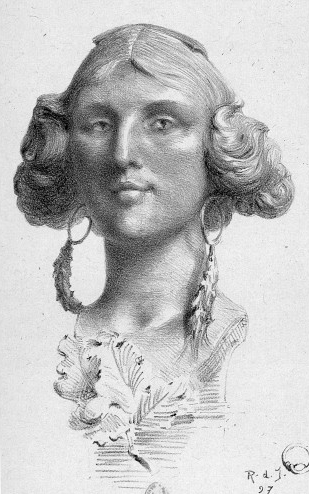
The Pastoral Symphony of Beethoven (1897)

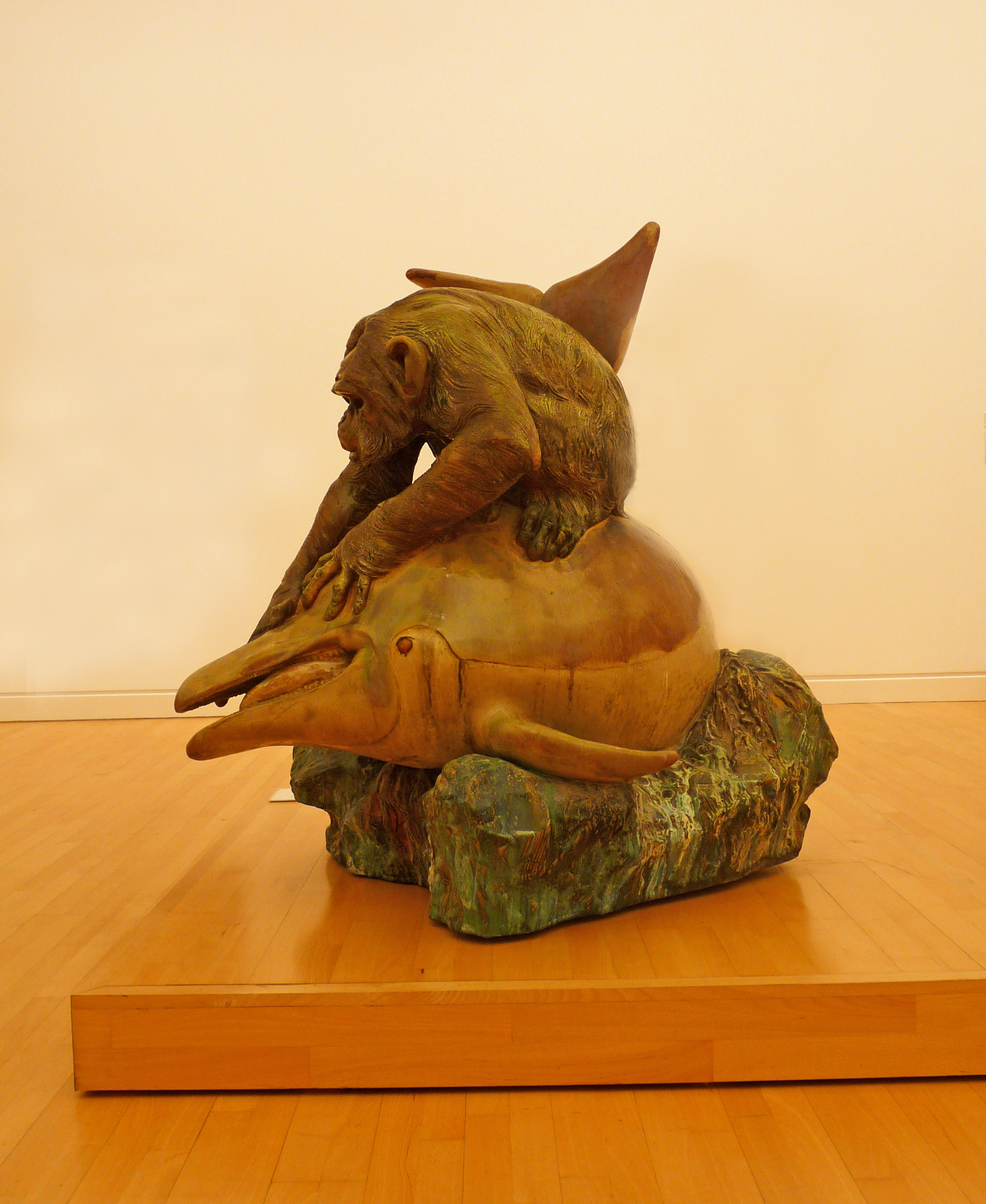
The Ape and the Dolphin (1903)
