= Es ist das Heil uns kommen her =

Lutheran hymn by Protestant preacher Paul Speratus

- Lutheran hymn
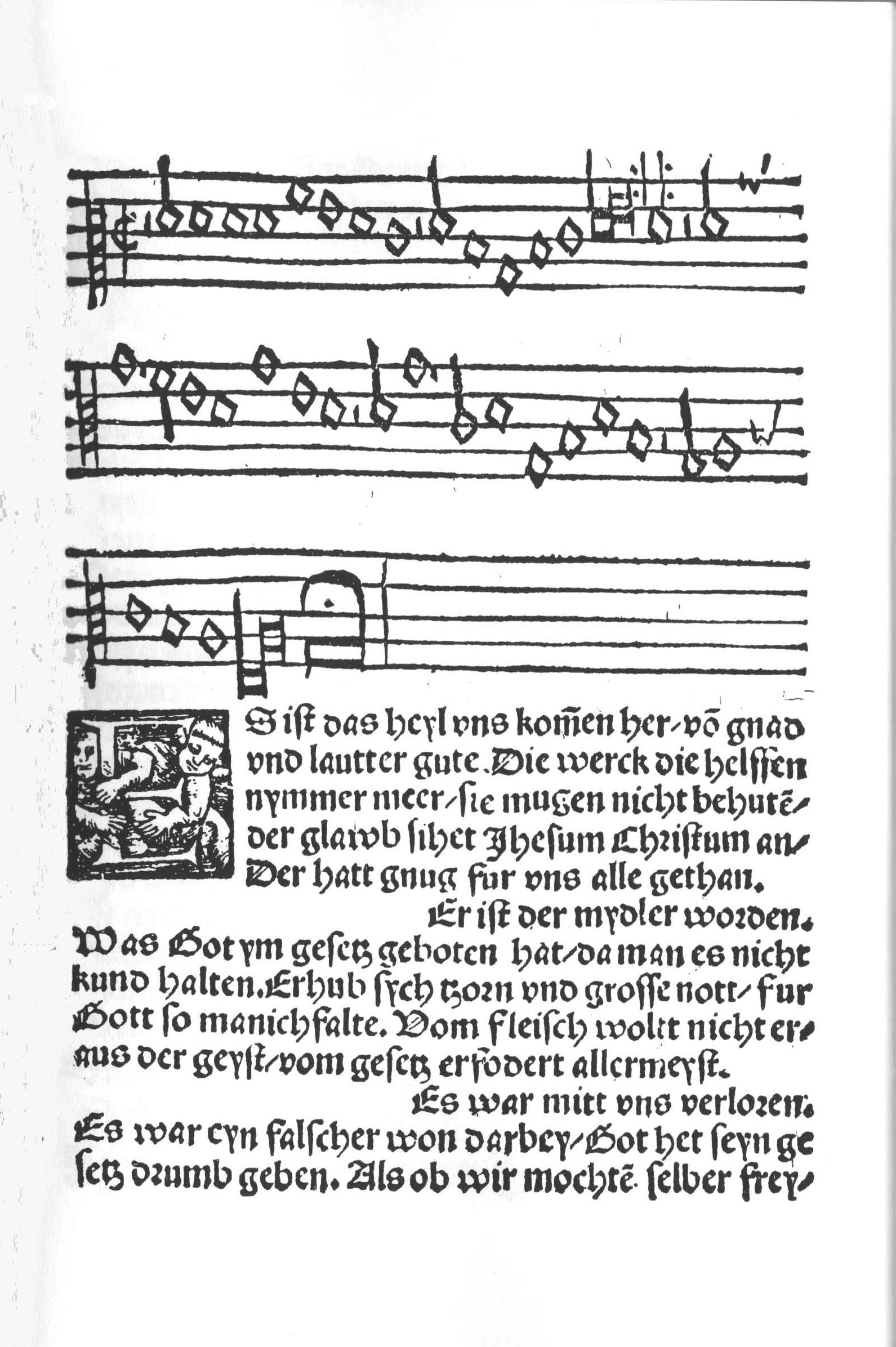
- "ES iſt das heyl vns kom̃en her" in the Erfurt Enchiridion, 1524
- English: Salvation now has come for all
- Catalogue: Zahn 4430
- Text: by Paul Speratus
- Language: German
- Published: 1524

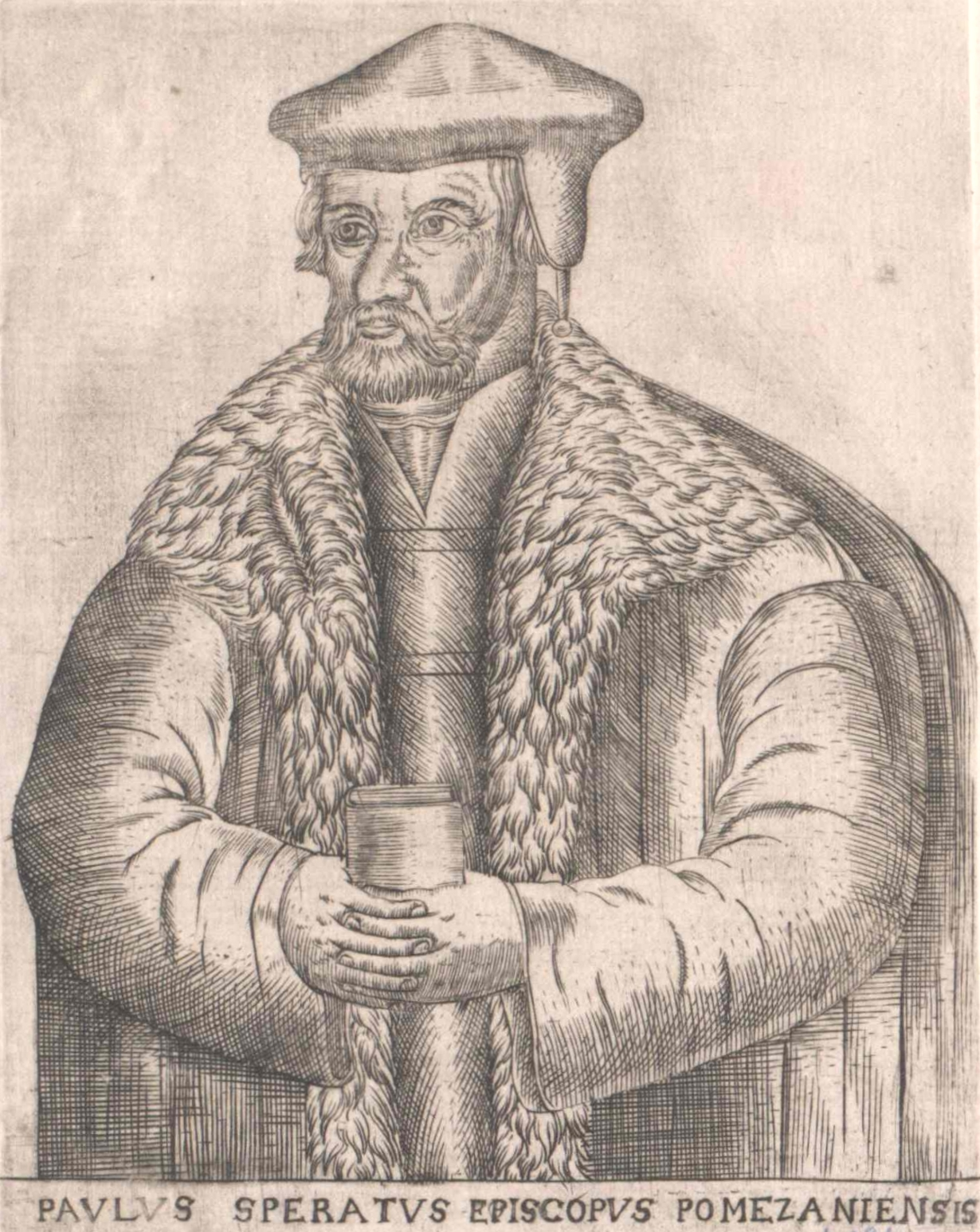
Paul Speratus, poet of the text

"Es ist das Heil uns kommen her" (originally: "Es iſt das heyl vns kom̃en her", English: "Salvation now has come for all" or more literally: It is our salvation come here to us) is a Lutheran hymn in 14 stanzas by Paul Speratus. It was first published as one of eight songs in 1524 in the first Lutheran hymnal, the Achtliederbuch, which contained four songs by Luther, three by Speratus, and one by Justus Jonas. The same year it appeared in Erfurt in Eyn Enchiridion. Its hymn tune, Zahn No. 4430, was already known in the 15th century.

== History ==
According to tradition, Speratus wrote this hymn while he was in prison in Olomouc, condemned for his evangelical beliefs to death by fire. Only by the intercession of friends was he released, on condition that he leave Moravia.

The text by Speratus is based on Paul's Epistle to the Romans, Romans 3:28. and expresses Luther's teaching about salvation. According to Scott Hendrix, "It not only emphasizes justification by faith alone but it also underlines the vitality of that faith manifested in service to others. A modern English version of the hymn's first stanza, which appears on the back cover of Hendrix's book Early Protestant Spirituality, is as follows:

Salvation unto us has come

by God's free grace and favor;

Good works cannot avert our doom,

they help and save us never.

Faith looks to Jesus Christ alone,
who did for all the world atone,

He is our mediator.

Speratus set his words to the tune of an Easter chorale from the 15th century, "Freu dich, du werte Christenheit".

== Influence ==
The story of Luther's being moved to tears when he first heard this hymn, from a beggar outside his window in Wittenberg, has been retold by many authors.

The 11th edition of the Encyclopædia Britannica, lists "Salvation now has come for all" as one of the Lutheran hymns "which at the time produced the greatest effect, and are still best remembered." It has been translated into English by many authors, including Miles Coverdale ("Now is our health come from above," 1539), Henry Mills ("Our whole salvation doth depend On God's free grace and Spirit," 1845), and Catherine Winkworth ("Salvation hath come down to us," 1869).

== Musical settings ==
The hymn, focused on essential Lutheran teaching, was frequently set for organ and for voices.

=== Organ settings ===
Jan Pieterszoon Sweelinck composed Prelude and Chorale Variations (two variations). Samuel Scheidt composed four parts as No. 46 of Das Görlitzer Tabulaturbuch (1650). Matthias Weckmann wrote Chorale Variations. Dieterich Buxtehude composed a chorale prelude, BuxWV 186, in C major. Chorale Preludes were further composed by Friedrich Wilhelm Zachow and Johann Gottfried Walther (LV 84).

Between 1708 and 1714, while Johann Sebastian Bach was court organist at the ducal court in Weimar, he compiled chorale preludes for the liturgical year in his Orgelbüchlein and included it as a catechism hymn, BWV 638. Georg Friedrich Kauffmann published a Chorale Prelude in Leipzig in 1733. Johann Ludwig Krebs also wrote a Chorale Prelude. Max Reger composed a chorale prelude as No. 10 of his 52 Chorale Preludes, Op. 67 in 1902, another in 1914 in his Op. 135a.

=== Choral settings ===
Arnold von Bruck composed a setting for four voices, published in 1544. Hans Leo Hassler wrote a four-part setting, Johann Hermann Schein set it twice with basso continuo, once for two sopranos (1618), once for four parts (1627). Georg Philipp Telemann composed in 1719 a sacred cantata on a text by Erdmann Neumeister Es ist das Heil uns kommen her.

Bach used the stanzas 11 and 12 in several of his cantatas in 1716, 1723 and 1724. Between 1732 and 1735, he used twelve stanzas as the base for his chorale cantata of the same name, BWV 9. Johannes Brahms composed it in 1860 as one of two motets for a five-part mixed chorus a cappella, Op. 29, a four-part chorale followed by an "elaborate fugal variation on the chorale melody".
