= Žalgiris =

Žalgiris is the Lithuanian-language calque of the Polish placename Grunwald, notable for the Battle of Grunwald (Lithuanian: Žalgirio mūšis, lit. 'Battle of Žalgiris').

Žalgiris may also refer to:

== Kaunas, Lithuania ==
- BC Žalgiris, basketball club from Kaunas founded in 1944
- Žalgiris Kaunas, FBK Kaunas, association football club from Kaunas spanning 1960–2012
- FK Kauno Žalgiris, association football club from Kaunas founded in 2004
- MRK Žalgiris Kaunas, women's handball club from Kaunas
- Žalgiris Arena, a multi-purpose indoor arena in Kaunas operating since 2011

== Vilnius, Lithuania ==
- BC Žalgiris Vilnius, former name of BC Statyba, a basketball club from Vilnius founded in 1963
- FK Žalgiris, association football club from Vilnius founded in 1947
- Žalgiris Stadium, a demolished multi-purpose stadium in Vilnius that operated between 1951–2011
- MFA Žalgiris-MRU, Lithuanian Women's A League association women football club from Vilnius founded in 2013
