= Al Grunwald =

American baseball player (1930–2011)

- Pitcher
- Born: February 13, 1930; Los Angeles, California, U.S.
- Died: January 18, 2011 (aged 80); Chatsworth, California, U.S.
- Batted: Left Threw: Left

MLB debut
- April 18, 1955, for the Pittsburgh Pirates

Last MLB appearance
- September 25, 1959, for the Kansas City Athletics

MLB statistics
- Win–loss record: 0–1
- Earned run average: 6.63
- Innings pitched: 19
- Stats at Baseball Reference

Teams
- Pittsburgh Pirates (1955); Kansas City Athletics (1959); Taiyō Whales (1962)

Alfred Henry Grunwald (February 13, 1930 – January 18, 2011) was an American professional baseball pitcher. He played parts of two seasons in Major League Baseball in 1955 and 1959. He also played one season in Nippon Professional Baseball in 1962.

Nicknamed "Stretch", Grundwald stood 6 feet 4 inches (1.93 m) tall, weighed 210 pounds (95 kg) and threw and batted left-handed. He was born in Los Angeles.

Grunwald was a first baseman in the minor leagues for the first five years of his professional career, before converting to pitcher in 1954. He hurled for the Pittsburgh Pirates during the 1955 season and with the Kansas City Athletics in 1959. He lost his only decision, giving up four runs on 25 hits and 18 walks while striking out in 19 innings of work.

Grunwald played 13 minor league seasons between 1947 and 1961, including stints in Mexico and Japan, and returned to first base duties during his final two seasons. He posted a 41-31 record and a 3.96 ERA in 160 pitching appearances. As a hitter, he collected a .295 average with 111 home runs and a slugging of .469 in 1392 games.

Grunwald died in Chatsworth, California, at the age of 80.
