= Georg Grünwald =

German Protestant reformer

Georg Grünwald, also Grüenwald, (c. 1490 – 1530) was a German Protestant reformer and hymn writer.

He was born in Kitzbühel c. 1490. According to a chronicle, Grünwald, a shoemaker, was a preacher of anabaptism. They were prosecuted, and he moved to Lackstatt in Bavaria in 1529. When he returned to Kitzbühel, he was imprisoned. In 1530, he was burnt at the stake for his conviction by the Austrian government.

Grünwald wrote the text of the hymn "Kommt her zu mir, spricht Gottes Sohn", but Philipp Wackernagel named Hans Witzstadt von Wertheim or Jörg Berckemeyer as its author. It is published in hymnals such as in Evangelisches Gesangbuch as EG 363, with seven stanzas.

== Literature ==
- Literature by and about Georg Grünwald in the German National Library catalogue
- Dorsch, Paul, Das Deutsche Evangelische Kirchenlied in Geschichtsbildern, 2nd ed., Stuttgart 1932, pp 83–89.
- Loserth, Johann: Grünwald, Georg (d. 1530). In: Global Anabaptist Mennonite Encyclopedia Online
- Johann Loserth, Art. Grünwald, in: Mennonitisches Lexikon vol. II (1937), p 195.
- ADB:Grüenwald, Georg (1879). "Grüenwald, Georg". Allgemeine Deutsche Biographie (in German). Vol. 10. Leipzig: Duncker & Humblot. p. 59.
