= Karl Grunwald =

Austrian art collector (1887–1964)

- Born: 1899; Austrian Empire
- Died: 1964 (aged 64–65)
- Citizenship: Austria
- Occupation: Art collector

Karl Grünwald (1899–1964) was an Austrian textiles trader and art collector and owner of one of the largest collection of Impressionist paintings.

== Life ==
According to the Kallir Research Institute, Grünwald and Egon Schiele served together in the military, and Grünwald helped obtain a transfer for Schiele in 1917. According to Alessandra Comini (1974, p. 156), he was one of the instigators of the Kunsthalle project. In June, the two traveled together to the Tirol on army business.

== Seizure of the art collection by the Nazis ==
In 1938, when Austria was annexed by Nazi Germany in the Anschluss, Carl Grunwald left for France, taking 50 of the most valuable paintings from his collection. The Nazis seized them in a warehouse in Strasbourg and auctioned them in 1942.

After the war, Karl and his son-Frédéric Grunwald tried to find scattered paintings around the world. The painting by Gustav Klimt, The Accomplishment (1905), was found in the collection of the Strasbourg Museum of Modern and Contemporary Art. However the museum refused to return it and the Grünwald heir was obliged to file a lawsuit. A French appeals court ruled that the museum must restitute the painting to the Grünwald heir.

The painting "Wilted Sunflowers" by Egon Schiele (painted in 1914) was restituted to the descendants of the collector sixty years after it was stolen by the Nazis in June 1942.

== Links ==
- Эгон Шиле, виртуальная выставка
- REDISCOVERED MASTERPIECE
