= Mateh Moshiach =

Chabad Meshichist organization in Israel

- Mateh Moshiach in the Holy Land
- מטה משיח
- Formation: 1995
- Founder: Shlomo Maydanchik
- Location: Israel
- Chairman of the Board: Jeremiah Barnober
- Chairman of the Executive Committee: Rabbi Shmuel Hendel
- Parent organization: Agudas Chasidei Chabad in Israel
- Website: matamoshiach.org

Mateh Moshiach (also Mateh Moshiach in the Holy Land) (Hebrew: מטה משיח) is a Chabad Meshichist organization focused on promoting the study and dissemination of teachings related to Moshiach and Geulah.

The organization was founded in 1995 by Shlomo Maydanchik, then chairman of Agudas Chasidei Chabad in Israel. It operates under the umbrella of Agudas Chasidei Chabad in Israel. The organization runs ad campaigns, hosts events and conferences and publishes magazines and books, on Moshiach and related topics.

Jeremiah Barnober serves as chairman of the board and Rabbi Shmuel Hendel as chairman of the executive committee.

== History ==
Mateh Moshiach was established in 1995 with the aim of promoting belief in the imminent arrival of the Messiah, including identification of the Messiah as Rabbi Menachem Mendel Schneerson. In 1999 a nonprofit entity associated with the organization was formally established and later dissolved in 2023

== Controversy ==
In 2005, Chabad news site COLlive reported that Rabbi Yitzchak Yehuda Yeruslavsky, chairman of Beis Din Rabbonei Chabad in Israel, issued a public letter for publication in Kfar Chabad magazine.

In the letter, Rabbi Yeruslavsky objected to materials distributed by Metah Moshiach that described the organization as operating under the "presidency" of The Rebbe, Rabbi Menachem Mendel Schneerson.

Yeruslavsky cited a 1982 directive attributed to Schneerson, stating that newly established institutions should not describe themselves as being under his presidency, and that publications that do so should be detracted and discarded; "in new institutions this is not written… and they should immediately destroy all such printed material"

He also criticized what he described as the widespread public display of images of the Rebbe “in every corner and pillar.”

== Events ==
The organization organizes a range of annual and one-off events centered on themes of redemption, moshiach, and Meshichist theology.

These include:

- Annual “Shabbat Shekula Moshiach” Shabbatons focused on study and discussion of redemption-related topics
- Large gatherings held annually around 11 Nissan, the birth date of Rabbi Menachem Mendel Schneerson and a Chabad holiday
- An annual conference held near 28 Nissan, marking a well-known Sicha given by the Rebbe, in which he urged followers to increase efforts to bring about redemption
- Seminars and educational programs on the topics of redemption and the Holy Temple

Events have featured performances by artists including Mordechai Ben David, Yaakov Shwekey, Lipa Schmelzer, Aharon Razel, and Yishai Lapidot.

== Publications ==
=== HaGeula Me'inyan V'Achshavi ===
Metah Moshiach publishes a weekly Hebrew-language newsletter titled HaGeula Me'inyan V'Achshavi (Hebrew: הגאולה מעניין ועכשווי) (literally; the redemption, interesting and current). The newsletter edited by Rabbi Ari Kedem. In 2014, in collaboration with the World Chabad Center for Greeting Moshiach, the newsletter began to be digitally published in English. As of 2018, the newsletter publishes around 120,000 copies. In 2015, the newsletter celebrating publishing its 770th edition, a number symbolically associated with 770 Eastern Parkway, the headquarters of the Chabad movement, 770 Eastern Parkway. At the time of the milestone issue, the newsletter reported circulation of approximately 120,000 copies.

=== Other publications ===
- Sefer Beit HaBecḥirah (ספר בית הבחירה) - “The Book of the Chosen House” Published in collaboration with the Temple Institute.
- Sidrat Ḥovrot Iyuniyot BeInyanei HaGeulah סדרת חוברות עיוניות בנושאי הגאולה - Series of Scholarly Booklets on the Topics of Redemption Edited by Aryeh Kedem and Menachem Zigelbaum, including:
  - Mevaser HaNetzaḥ מבשר הנצח - The Herald of Eternity, on Elijah the Prophet
  - HaTeḥiyah HaGedolah התחיה הגדולה - The Great Resurrection
  - Bonim et Beit HaMikdash בונים את בית המקדש - Building the Holy Temple
- Higia Zeman Ge’ulatkhem הגיע זמן גאולתכם - The Time has come for your Redemption Covers themes from the prophecies surrounding the Gulf War to the concept of redemption; published in 2016
- Geulat HaMada גאולת המדע - Redemption of the Science A compilation from the “Geulah in the World” section of HaGeulah; published in 2017
- Birkon im Peninei Geulah ברכון עם פניני גאולה - Birchon with Pearls of Redemption A bentcher featuring teachings on redemption and Moshiach based on the talks of the Rebbe, intended for use in restaurants; published in 2018.
