= Beis Moshiach =

- Categories: Moshiach, Geulah, The Rebbe, Chabad
- Frequency: Weekly
- Publisher: World Chabad Center for Greeting Moshiach
- Founded: 1994
- Company: World Chabad Center for Greeting Moshiach
- Country: United States
- Based in: Brooklyn, New York, United States
- Language: Hebrew, English
- Website: bmoshiach.org
- ISSN: 1082-0272

Beis Moshiach is a weekly Chabad Meshichist color magazine, containing shlichus stories, miracle accounts, and articles on the Rebbe, Moshiach, Chabad movement history, and the lives and teachings of Chabad leaders. Its stated goal is to spread the message of Geulah through Rebbe Melech HaMoshiach.

The magazine's primary office is located in Crown Heights, Brooklyn, and a subsidiary editorial office in Kfar Chabad, Israel. It distributes thousands of copies worldwide through direct mailing to subscribers and stores globally. It is published by the World Chabad Center for Greeting Moshiach. The weekly magazine is published in two editions - Hebrew and English, with each edition having its own editorial staff and writers in their respective offices. The magazine is available globally through a subscription model, and is also carried at Empire Kosher and Kosherfamily.org.

The magazine's proclaimed goal, per its website, is to "prepare the world to greet Moshiach Tzidkeinu" and the cover carries the subheading; "Bringing Moshiach values into our homes."

== History ==
In the aftermath of the passing of The Rebbe Menachem Mendel Schneerson in 1994, Chabad's official magazine in Israel, Kfar Chabad Magazine, began to moderate Meshichist theology. This period is referred to by Meshichist news website Chabad.info as "the crucial weeks after Gimmel Tammuz 5754". To get around the moderation, three Meshichist Chabad Rabbis, Rabbi Zalman Hertzel, Rabbi Menachem Mendel Hendel, and Rabbi Shlomo Halperin published the first edition of Kfar Chabad on Menachem Av 5754. This was to the encouragement of prominent Chabad rabbis and mashpim in Israel and the US.

== Supplemental magazines ==
- SALUTE! - Children's Magazine - "The Beis Moshiach Supplement for Tzivos Hashem Soldiers "
- HaTomim - Yeshiva Magazine -
- The Chassidishe Vibe - Women's Magazine, "The Beis Moshiach Magazine for N'shei uBnos Chabad"

== Special editions ==
The magazine often publishes special editions, for Chabad holidays, Jewish holidays, and milestones.

- Chof Zayin Adar edition
- Gimmel Tammuz edition
- Chof Av edition
