= 7for70 =

- Founder: Rabbi Boaz Kali
- Founded at: Haifa, Israel
- Type: Noahide outreach organization
- Official language: English, Hebrew, Arabic
- Affiliations: Chabad messianism
- Website: https://7for70.com/

7for70 (short for Seven Laws for Seventy Nations) a.k.a. The Center for the Seven Noahide Commandments is a Chabad-affiliated Noahide outreach organization that promotes the Seven Laws of Noah to non-Jewish communities, particularly among Palestinians in Israel and Israeli-occupied territories The organization was founded by Rabbi Boaz Kali together with Rabbis Yosef Yitzhak Vilishansky, Tuvia Bolton and Gidi Sharon, Rabbi Kali served as the organizations chairman until his death in 2018. The organization is affiliated with Chabad messianism It describes itself as "Dedicated to teaching the universal laws as a morality code for the basis of civilization." The organization has a relationship with The Association for True and Complete Redemption. In 2007 a seven mitzvot declaration initiative was run. The organization uses the Moshiach flag in Hebrew and Arabic.

== Publications ==
- Posters and fliers in Arabic
- TSha'ar ha-Yichud ve'ha'Emunah ("The Gateway of Unity and Belief") chapter of the Alter Rebbe's Tanya - Arabic
- Shaar HaYechud and Amuna - Arabic
- Noahide Siddur
