= Moshiach flag =

Chabad messianist flag

The Moshiach flag (Hebrew: דגל המשיח) is a flag and religious symbol used by members of Chabad who affiliate with Chabad messianism a.k.a. Meshichists. The flag was designed in and first printed in 1994 by Yaakov Ben Ari, a Chabad Rabbi from Kiryat Malachi and the Shliach to the Kibbutzim in Israel. The flag's purpose is to raise awareness of the coming of the Moshiach, identified as the Rebbe Menachem Mendel Schneerson.

== History ==
In 1993, The Association for True and Complete Redemption located in 770 Eastern Parkway, printed flags in preparation for Shemini Atzeret and Simchat Torah. These messianic flags were printed with the inscription: "יחי המלך משיח צדקנו לעולם ועד" (Long live the King Messiah, our tzadik forever).

The following year during an Oslo Accords protest in the Israeli settlement of Kiryat Arba, Rabbi Yaakov Ben Ari was inspired to create a dedicated flag for the Chabad moshiach movement. He then designed and printed the first Moshiach flags. Originally, the flag was going to feature a red crown and blue text.

The specific crown used on the flag was taken from a poster Rabbi Yaakov Ben Ari saw while waiting for an elevator in Safed.

According to a Moshiach flag listing on noahideshop.com, the flag is tied to Psalm 20:6 "We will rejoice in your deliverance, and raise our banners in the name of our God; may the Lord fulfill all your wishes".

Yellow, blue, and red were chosen based on previous Chabad campaigns from 1992 "Prepare for the coming of Moshiach" and 1993 "Welcome King Moshiach", which used these colors and popularized them as "Moshiach colors" in Israel.

A lapel pin version of the flag has been popular among Chabad Meshichist's following the September 11 attacks as public displays of flags and pins became a global trend.

Since 2024 a distribution initiative has been in operation in Israel and Brooklyn, with the goal of hanging a moshiach flag on as many homes as possible to raise awareness of the coming of messiah. The campaign distributes subsidized flag packages, including a flag, flag mount, flag unroller, and included installation.

On May 13, 2024, during a pro-Israel protest at UCLA, the CBS News crew covering the event spotted a Moshiach flag in English being waved by a protestor, and was unfamiliar with it. The commentator said "First I've seen of this. I've never seen this flag before or this logo", "I don't know if that's what this group is. We've been trying to get a clear view of what that says", and struggled to pronounce the word "Moshiach".

A Moshiach flag has been flown on a flagpole on the sidewalk in front of 770 Eastern Parkway since at least 2024. Many of the traffic lights near 770 have Moshiach flags hung on them.

During the Gaza war an embroidered Moshiach flag patch in olive green began being popularized and sold by multiple Chabad Meshichist product suppliers. The Moshiach flag patches became a popular trend among Chabad men enlisted in the IDF.

Additionally, several tanks have been documented both in and out of action with Moshiach flags mounted on them.

Chabad Messianism adherents sometimes will wear Kippah's decorated with the Yechi declaration as well as the Moshiach flag.

== Variants ==
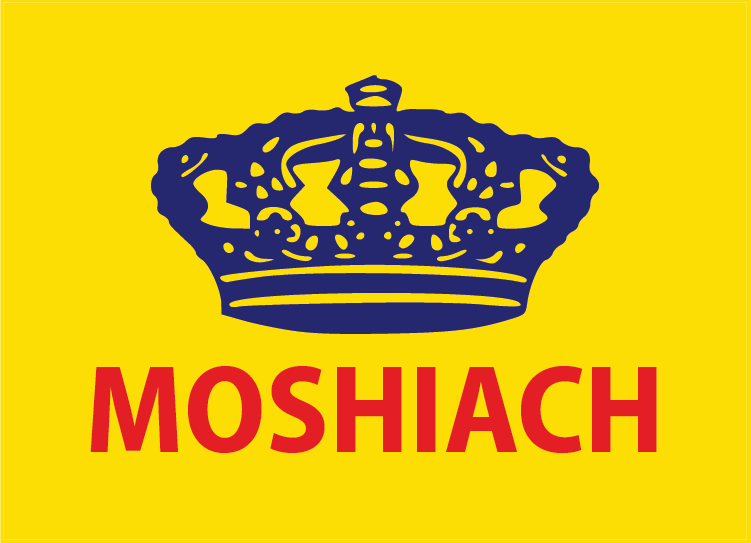
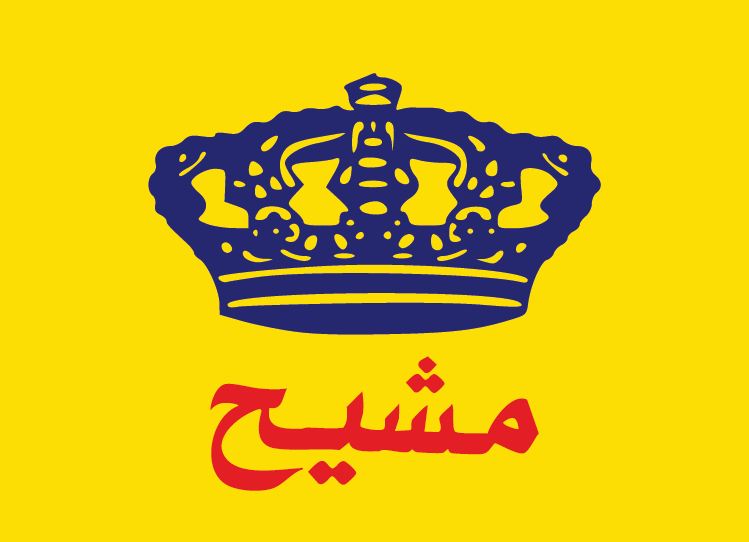
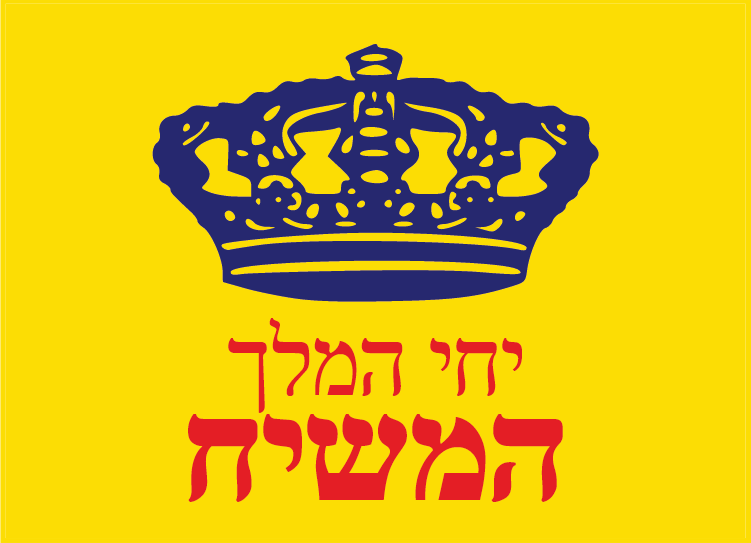
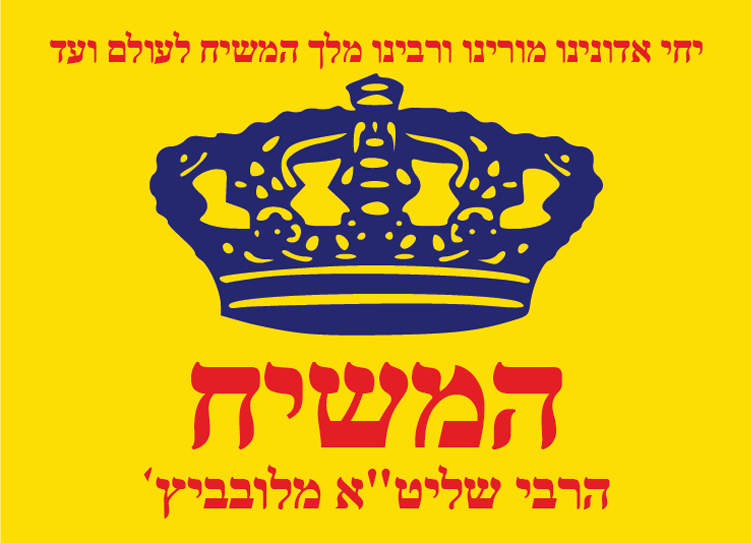
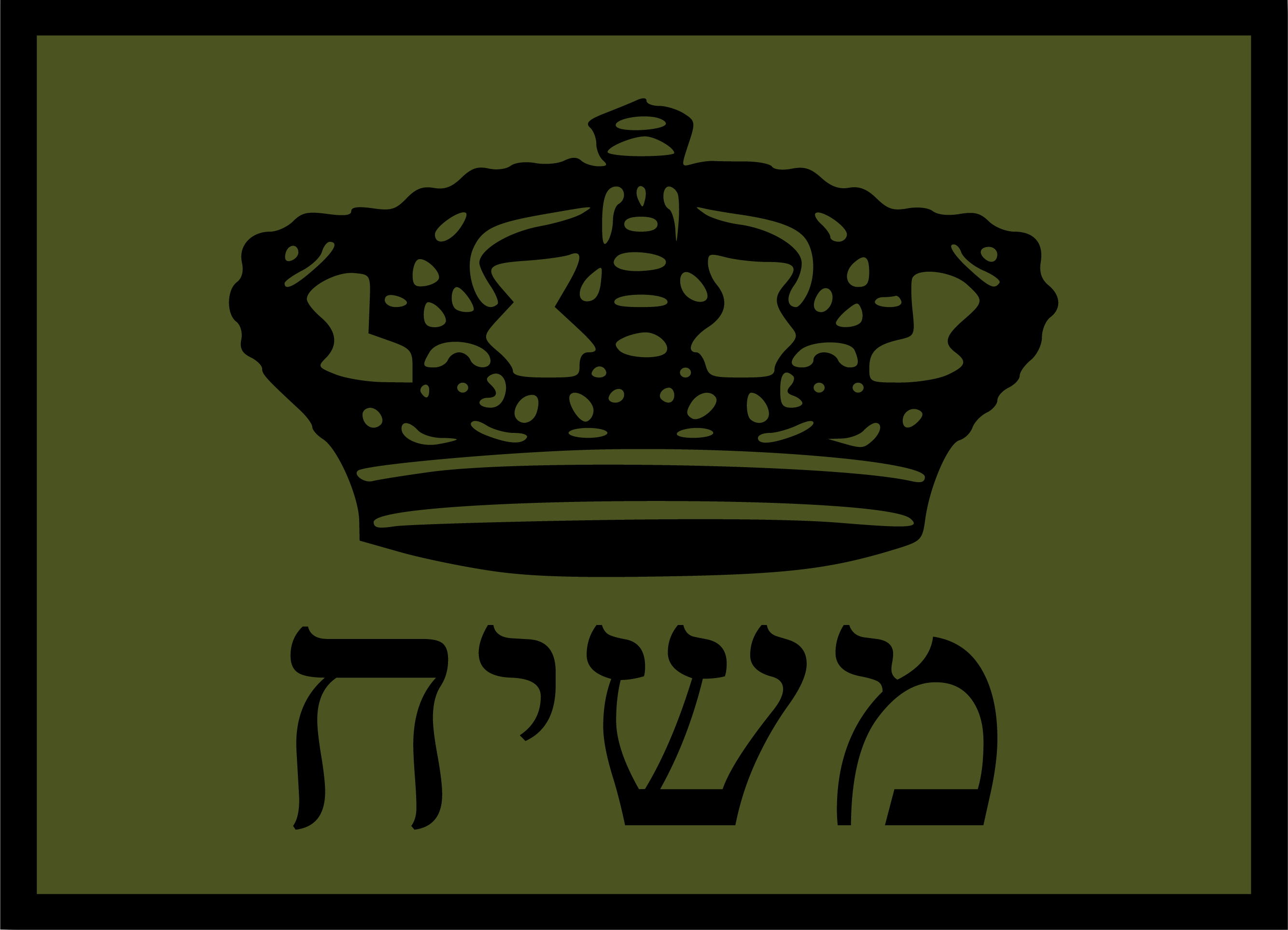
| Flag | Description and Use | Sources |
|---|---|---|
| Hebrew Moshiach Flag | The original Moshiach flag has the word messiah in hebrew: משיח. It is used across Israel and in Crown Heights, Brooklyn, New York. |
| English Moshiach Flag | The English transliterated flag contains the word Moshiach and is commonly used across the United States and other English speaking countries. |
| Arabic Moshiach Flag | An Arabic version of the Moshiach flag was created and used by Meshichist activists in Israel and the Palestinian territories. Primarily by the organization 7for70 under the direction of Rabbi Boaz Kali. |
| Short Yechi Moshiach Flag | Instead of "Moshiach", this version has "Yechi HaMelech HaMoshiach" (Long live the king Moshiach). First distributed by Meshichist publishing and distribution organization Mamesh. |
| Full Yechi Moshiach Flag | The full Yechi version is decorated with the full Yechi decleration: יחי אדוננו מורנו ורבינו מלך המשיח לעולם ועד (Long live our master, our teacher and our rabbi king moshiach forever and ever) above the crown and below it: המשיח הרבי שליט״א מלובביץ׳ (The Moshiach the Lubavitcher Rebbe Shlita) |
| IDF-Style Moshiach Flag Patch | Moshiach flag patch in olive green, used by religious IDF soldiers, Chabad and non-Chabad. |
