= With Us More Than Ever =

2020 Israeli book of religious study

With Us More Than Ever: Making the Absent Rebbe Present in Messianic Chabad
- Author: Yoram Bilu
- Language: English
- Series: Spiritual Phenomena
- Genre: Research
- Publisher: Stanford University Press
- Publication date: July 21, 2020
- Pages: 344 Pages
- ISBN: 9781503608344

With Us More Than Ever: Making the Absent Rebbe Present in Messianic Chabad is a book by Yoram Bilu, Israeli professor emeritus of anthropology and psychology at the Hebrew University of Jerusalem. The book is an abbreviated English translation of Bilu's Hebrew monograph ‘Itanu yoter mi-tamid' (Open University, 2016). The research focuses on the Meshichist community a.k.a. Chabad messianism, who deny the death of the 7th Rebbe of Chabad, Menachem Mendel Schneerson, and maintain that he only changed the form of his existence and went into concealment. It explores the beliefs and practical ways in which they perpetuate the attachment to their absent leader.
