= Mamesh =

- Mamesh - Chabad Center for the Spread of the Light of Redemption
- ממש - מרכז חב"ד להפצת אור הגאולה
- Formation: 2001
- Founder: Yosef Yitzhak Friedman & Rabbi Elad Kantor
- Founded at: New York
- Location: Bat Yam, Israel
- Official language: Hebrew
- Revenue: ₪960,266 (2024)
- Staff: 9 (2024)
- Website: https://mamesh.org/

Mamesh (Hebrew: ממש) is a Chabad messianic religious product distributor and media publisher. publishing and distributing materials on the subjects of redemption and the Moshiach. The organizations name is an acronym for the words Machon Malchut ShebeTiferet (Hebrew: מכון מלכות שבתפארת). Mamesh produces materials for distribution for all Jewish holidays, supplying directly to Chabad Shluchim (emissaries) and directors of Chabad houses. In the weeks leading up to Jewish Holidays the organization releases a catalog and hosts a product fair to show off and allow preordering of materials for distribution. The organization is aligned with and is a major resource hub of the Chabad messianism movement, promoting belief in Menachem Mendel Schneerson as the Jewish Messiah. The organization also hosts gatherings and conferences. According to their registration on Guidestar.org, the Israeli ministry of justice's official website, their goal is; "Spreading the gospel of redemption through conferences, publishing, Torah research, written advocacy and various media, cultivating religious values, Torah and mitzvot, and establishing institutions to accelerate redemption'. The organizations materials are often created in collaboration with The Association for True and Complete Redemption.

== History ==
The organization was established in New York in 2001 and was operated by Rabbi Yosef Yitzhak Friedman and Rabbi Elad Kantor. Over the years, the organization has produced publications and booklets from the Rebbe's teachings. In 2003, the institute's Israeli branch was established in the city of Bnei Brak with additional branches in Safed and Kfar Chabad. Every year, the organization produces and distributes hundreds of thousands of Moshiach stickers for posting throughout Israel. In 2015, the center moved to the city of Bat Yam, known in Meshichist circles as the City of Geula (Redemption). The new locations includes the Mashem Plus Mall (קניון ממש פלוס), a storefront with all Mamesh products for sale, a showroom with photos of the organization's activity over the years, and a warehouse that serves as the organization's logistics center, and office's

== Mamesh LeGani ==
Mamesh also produces a wide range of educational materials geared towards Chabad Meshichist preschools under the umbrella of Mamesh LeGani. Hundreds of educational products are produced for teachers, preschools, kindergartens and parents. Products include worksheets, puzzles, posters, children's books, and activities. Also produced are preschool kits that include holidays crowns and posters for all the Jewish holidays, with special emphasis placed on Chabad holidays, many products contain the proclamation, Yechi HaMelech.

== Geula Taxis ==
A yearly campaign by Mamesh in the days leading up to the Chabad holidays of 12th-13th Tammuz seeks to raise public awareness and acceptance of the Rebbe as the Jewish moshiach. Dozens of large service taxis circulate throughout Israel covered in graphics with Chabad messianism religious content, including photos of the Rebbe, the chant and proclamation "Yechi", as well as the information on how to contact the Rebbe via Bibliomancy using Igrot Kodesh.

== Publications ==
- Daver Malchut with Interpretations
- Nevi Mekrabach (נביא מקרבך) - 2007 - Biography of the Rebbe
- Moshiach Pictures and Moments (משיח תמונות ורגעים) - 2008
- Mo'edim - 2012 - content from the Rebbe's talks on the Jewish holidays with practical instructions for everyday life.
- Kahel Gadol - 2009 - systematically summarizes the Rebbe's teachings on matters of the community
- The Sun and Its Blessings (החמה וברכתה) - 2008
- Album HaShlichut - 2026
- Tikkun Leil Shavuot
- Panasaim - Monthly paper
- HaHagada HaChadasha - ההגדה החדשה

== See also ==
- Mamesh on Chabadpedia
- Chabad messianism
- mamesh.org
