= Association for True and Complete Redemption =

Hasidic Jewish organisation

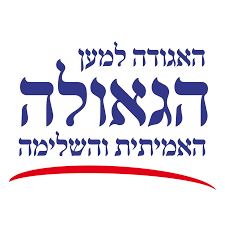
- Formation: 1991
- Founder: Rabbi Zimroni Tsik
- Founded at: Bat Yam, Israel
- Official language: Hebrew
- Chairman: Rabbi Chaim Tsik
- Affiliations: Chabad messianism
- Website: https://www.hageula.com/

The Association for True and Complete Redemption (Hebrew: האגודה למען הגאולה האמיתית והשלימה) is a Chabad Meshichist organization founded by Rabbi Zimroni Tsik in 1991. The organization publishes a weekly newsletter, a monthly newspaper, distributes informational materials, operates a website, and holds several conferences each year with thousands of attendees.

The organization and its activities occupy a central place in Chabad messianism. Professor Yoram Bilu's research on Messianism in Chabad is based primarily on the organization's publications.

== History ==
The association was established in 1991 by a number of Chabad Hasidim in of Bat Yam, Israel, following a sicha (talk) given by the Lubavitcher Rebbe. During the talk, given on the 28th of Nissan in 1991, the Rebbe proclaimed that he had done all he could to bring Moshiach, and that it was now up to his followers to do all that they can to bring the Moshiach.

At its inception, the association's focus was publishing media on the coming of the Moshiach, publishing a biweekly newspaper called The True and Complete Redemption, followed by a weekly newsletter called Sichat HaGeula, which today distributes 50,000 copies weekly.

== Controversy ==
On the anniversary of the Rebbe's death; Gimmel Tammuz in 2007, the association's chairman, Rabbi Zimroni Tsik and his followers held a celebration at the Ehrlich Pub in Tel Aviv to mark 13 years since the departure of the Rebbe. According to Israeli news website Ynet Rabbi Tsik invited the general public to join them in toasting in honor of the Rebbe's "departure". The celebration shocked the larger Chabad and Jewish communities, it was also covered in secular Israeli media.

In response, the Beit Din Rabbonei Chabad of Israel released a ruling and statement condemning the event and its organizers. The Court also stated that "the organizations operated by them do not belong to Chabad and do not at all represent the path of Chabad Hasidism." This is in reference to The Association for True and Complete Redemption, and its primary publication, Sichat HaGeula. In addition, the Beit Din's statement prohibited them from using the name Chabad or Lubavitch, and demanded they cease all distribution of printed material using the name of Chabad or Lubavitch. The rabbis concluded their remarks with a call to the general public: "The court calls on everyone who holds the honor of the Rebbe dear to them, not to participate with the people who organized the events in their activities and gatherings, and not to distribute anything that is printed and published."

Chabad magazine Kfar Chabad reported that Rabbi Mordechai Shmuel Ashkenazi ordered a ban on the distribution of Sichot HaGeula in the Kfar Chabad's synagogues. The weekly paper is edited by Rabbi Zimroni Tsik. Kfar Chabad magazine emphasized that the court's decision was not directed at all Mishichists: "This is a specific story against a defined and wild group among Meshichists. There is an intention here to take their actions outside of Chabad law. In their behavior, they crossed all the lines."

The organizers of the "Bar Campaign" announced in advertisements that the rules of modesty at the event were observed according to the guidance of Rabbi Gedaliah Axelrod an Mordechai Shmuel Ashkenazi influential Rabbi in the Meshichist community. Following the uproar that arose from the campaign, Rabbi Axelrod issued a statement in which he announced that "what the above-mentioned people published that I had some connection to their activities is a blatant lie. The action they took is contrary to Halacha and is absolutely prohibited."

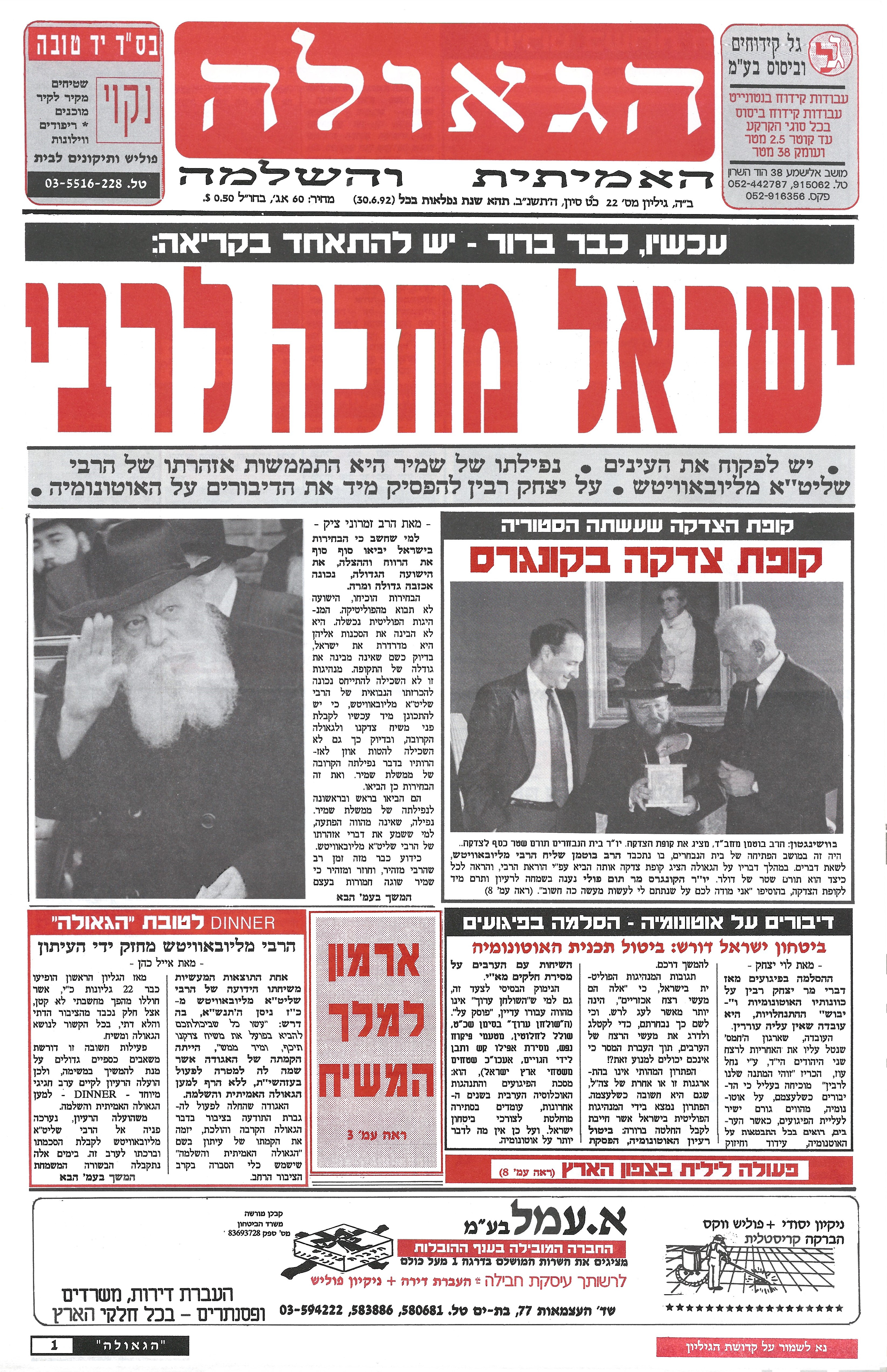
Cover of HaGeula newspaper, issue no. 22 (30.09.1992)

== Events ==
- Moshiach BaKikar - A redemption rally held on the Chabad holiday Yud Beis Tammuz, 2018 in Rabin Square in Tel Aviv.
- Moshiach Congress - In 2023, the organization announced an annual Moshiach Congress in Israel.
- The Science of Faith and Redemption Conference - Held annually in partnership with Machon RYAL.

== Publications ==
- HaGeula HaAmitit VeHaShleima 48-page monthly, including a newspaper and a supplement distributed free of charge, mainly in secular and traditional communities.
- Sichat HaGeula
- Moshiach Cards
