= Yoram Bilu =

Israeli professor of anthropology and psychology

- יורם בילו
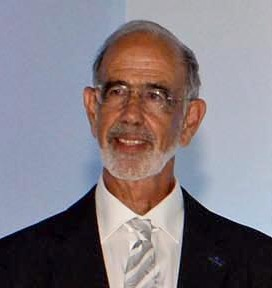
- Yoram Bilu in 2013
- Born: 6 March 1942 (age 84)
- Occupations: Anthropologist; Psychologist; Professor emeritus
- Known for: Research on folk religion, culture and mental health, and Moroccan Jewish practices
- Awards: Israel Prize (2013)

Yoram Bilu (Hebrew: יורם בילו; born March 6, 1942) is an Israeli professor emeritus of anthropology and psychology at the Hebrew University of Jerusalem and Member of the Israeli Academy of Sciences and Humanities.

He is known for his work on folk religion (messianism, saint worship); the interaction between culture and mental health; the sanctification of space in Israel; and the religious and cultural practices of Moroccan Jews. He is recipient of 2013 the Israel Prize in sociology and anthropology. He is a member of the Israel Academy of Sciences and Humanities.

From 2003 to 2004 he held a fellowship at the Katz Center for Advanced Judaic Studies. He has also been a member of the Israeli Society and of the American Association of Anthropology and serves as a member of the following scientific journals: Transcultural Psychiatry, Anthropology and Medicine, Contemporary Jewry. In 2020, he published With Us More Than Ever: Making the Absent Rebbe Present in Messianic Chabad, an English translation of his 2016 Hebrew monograph on the same subject.
