= Bentcher =

Booklet of prayers based around a particular event such as the Jewish sabbath

A bentcher, (Note: Also benscher, bencher, bentsher.) birchon or birkon (pl. bentchers, birchonim, birkonim) is a booklet of prayers based around a particular event such as the Jewish sabbath. The most common form is Birkat Hamazon often titled סדר ברכת המזון - Seder Birkat Hamazon (Order of Grace after Meals) in Hebrew. Some editions actually have the Birkat Hamazon prayer in the back, appearing almost as an afterthought. Bentchers are commonly known as birkonim in Modern Hebrew and Sephardic communities.

Bentchers are used widely in the various religious and traditional communities of Jews, such as Orthodox, Sephardic, Conservative, Reconstructionist, Mizrahi, Chassidic, Orthodox Feminist, as well as other communities.

Bentchers are often decorated with scrollwork, illuminations, pictorial backgrounds on each page, photo pages and by other means. This is in the tradition of hiddur mitzvah, or beautification of the mitzvah. There are several services currently available that customize the bentcher using graphics, logos and/or photographs.

== Common features ==
Bentchers, particularly those of the common Birkat Hamazon variety often share in common prayers which are said on a daily, weekly, annual, or intermittent basis, such as

- Hadlakat Nerot: lighting Shabbat candles
- Hadlakat Nerot of Yom Tov: Holiday eve candle lighting
- Shalom Aleichem
- Eishet Chayil (Proverbs 31)
- Birkat Habanim: Blessing the Children
- Sabbath Eve kiddush
- Sabbath Morning kiddush
- Kiddush for various occasions
- Zemirot for Erev Shabbat
- Zemiroth for Shabbat
- Zemirot for Seudah Shlishit
- Zemirot for Melaveh Malkah
- Havdalah: Ending the Shabbat or Yom Tov
- Birkat Hamazon at the banquet of a brit milah
- Birkat Hamazon at a Jewish wedding banquet
- Sheva Brachot: the Seven (Nuptial) Blessings
- Blessings before all food
- Blessings after food without bread

== Common varieties ==
Bentchers come in a very wide variety of styles, and types, all of which are based on the nusach and minhagim of the community. Bentchers are generally printed in Hebrew only, Hebrew plus vernacular translation, or Hebrew plus vernacular translation and Hebrew transliteration for participation by those unfamiliar Hebrew.

Common Bentcher
A common bentcher may contain the Birkat Hamazon prayer, the kiddush for Erev Shabbat (Sabbath Eve - Friday night), Sabbath morning, various prayers after foods and drinks, and Sabbath table songs.

Sefer HaKiddush
Sefer HaKiddush is a special bencher, which is often hardcover and maybe leather bound and especially decorated. This bentcher contains all of the kiddush prayers for the eves and mornings of Shabbat and Jewish holidays and is most used by the head of the household (usually the father) or a rabbi. It is frequently given as a wedding gift to the groom.

Sheva Brachot
A sefer Sheva Brachot is a bentcher which is especially printed for the occasion of a wedding and/or the week after a wedding. This bentcher contains the seven blessings recited by family and friends of the bride and groom under the chuppah at a Jewish wedding, and after birkat hamazon at the end of special meals in the week following the wedding. The sefer Sheva Brachot may contain special commentary on the meaning of the blessings.

Shiron or Zemirot
A shiron is a bentcher with an emphasis on songs. A shiron may typically have extra selections of Sabbath table songs, as well as songs for the Holidays and weddings. A special section, perhaps at the end of the shiron may contain a table of contents introducing extra songs, such as is found in widely popular benchers in the Orthodox and Conservative movements.

Simchon
A simchon is a shiron which features prayers and songs specific to a simcha or happy event such as a Bar or Bat Mitzvah, wedding or Brit Milah.

The Card Variety
Some bentchers are made to be portable, or are made primarily for use in cafeterias and restaurants. These bentchers are printed on laminated cards that either fold in half, in thirds, or do not fold at all.

== Novelties ==
Bentchers are often printed as souvenirs of special occasions, such as a Bar Mitzvah or wedding. A common practice in North America is to create a specially designed Jewish monogram which is composed of an artistic rendition of the celebrants' names in Hebrew in the shape of something recognizable such as a flame, the trick being to try to make out the actual letters. Some times the names are written in micography.

Novelty "bentcher pens" have a pull tab which reveals a scrolled paper containing the text of the Birkat Hamazon prayer.
