= World Chabad Center for Greeting Moshiach =

Chabad Meshichist organization and publishing body

- Chabad World Center To Greet Moshiach Inc
- מרכז חב"ד העולמי לקבלת פני משיח
- Formation: 1998
- Legal status: Civic Organization
- Headquarters: 744 Eastern Parkway
- Location: New York City, United States
- Official language: English, Hebrew
- Director: Rabbi Menachem Mendel Hendel
- Secretary: Rabbi Baruch Mishulovin
- Publication: Beis Moshiach, Geulah
- Subsidiaries: Beis Moshiach, Eshel Hachnosas Orchim, Vaad Sichot Kodesh
- Affiliations: Chabad messianism
- Website: https://bmoshiach.org/

World Chabad Center for Greeting Moshiach, a.k.a. Chabad World Center to Greet Moshiach, (Hebrew: מרכז חב"ד העולמי לקבלת פני משיח) is a Chabad Meshichist organization and publishing body dedicated to promoting teachings about Moshiach, Chabad Chasidus and the teachings of Rebbe Menachem Mendel Schneerson. Its director is Rabbi Menachem Mendel Hendel and it was established in 1996. The organization puts out weekly Meshichist publications, Beis Moshiach, and Geulah. The center has been described as the organizational backbone of Chabad Messianism. It is the parent organization of Beis Moshiach Inc, Eshel Hachnosas Orchim, and Vaad Sichot Kodesh. Annually on the Rebbe's birthday, Yud Aleph Nissan, the center runs a Mitzvah tank convoy.

== Eshel Hachnosas Orchim ==
Chabad Lubavitch Hospitality Center Eshel Hachnosas Orchim Inc. is a non-profit organization that coordinates accommodations for visitors staying in Crown Heights during the month of Tishrei, a busy time when many Chabad followers from around the world visit 770 Eastern Parkway for the High Holy Days.

== Vaad L’Hafotzas Sichos ==
The organization runs Vaad L’Hafotzas Sichos, which publishes anthologies of the Rebbe’s talks, including Likkutei Sichos B’Inyonei Geulah U’Moshiach.

== World Moshiach Congress ==
The World Moshiach Congress (Hebrew: קונגרס משיח העולמי) is an annual gathering held by Chabad Meshichists at Chabad Headquarters; 770 Eastern Parkway. The event is organized by the World Chabad Center for Greeting Moshiach and is typically held on the 2nd and 3rd of Tammuz. During the event, lectures on redemption and messiah are given by guest Chabad Shluchim and rabbis. The congress includes panels, an opening session, closing session, and a gathering for the children of the Crown Heights Chabad community.

== Publications ==
=== Beis Moshiach ===
Beis Moshiach is the organization's primary publication, a weekly color magazine, containing shlichus stories, miracle accounts, and articles on the Rebbe, Moshiach, Chabad movement history, and the lives and teachings of Chabad leaders. Its stated goal is to spread the message of Geulah through Rebbe Melech HaMoshiach. It is produced in Hebrew and English. It is published by Beis Moshiach, Inc., a separate nonprofit of the center.

=== Geulah ===
Geulah is a weekly English color magazine, self described as providing: "Updates and insights on the ongoing process of redemption, blending news, Torah teachings, and Chassidic perspectives. Each issue connects current events to the themes of Moshiach and the Geulah, offering spiritual guidance and inspiration for readers to deepen their understanding and hope for the final redemption"
