= Yitzchak Hendel =

Canadian rabbi

Rabbi Yitzchak Hendel
- Born: 1916; Komarów-Osada, Poland
- Died: 2007; Montreal, Canada
- Occupations: Chief Rabbi, Montreal Chabad community (1944-2007); Chief Rabbi, Montreal Rabbinical Court (1952-2007)

Rabbi Yitzchak HaCohen Hendel (1916-2007) was a prominent Chabad Hasidic rabbi from Montreal. From 1944 until his death in 2007, Rabbi Hendel served as the chief rabbi of the Chabad community in Montreal.

== Biography ==
Rabbi Yitzchak Hendel was born in 1916 in the town of Komarów-Osada, Poland. He joined the Chabad movement while studying in Warsaw. During World War II, Rabbi Hendel and a number of rabbinical students escaped to Shanghai. After the war, Rabbi Hendel moved to Montreal.

Rabbi Yitzchak Hendel served as the chief rabbi for Montreal's Chabad community. His appointment as chief rabbi began soon after his marriage in 1944. Upon the request of the Lubavitcher Rebbe, Rabbi Menachem Mendel Schneerson Rabbi Hendel helped establish the Chabad community in Montreal. Aside from leading the Chabad community in Montreal, Rabbi Hendel additionally served as the Av Beis Din (head of the rabbinical court) for Montreal's Orthodox Jewish community.
