= Kfar Chabad (magazine) =

Israeli weekly magazine

- Editor: Menachem Cohen
- Editor-in-Chief: Aharon Dov Halperin
- Editorial Staff Member: Yosef Naprestek
- Editorial Board Members: Yitzhak Yehuda Holtzman Moshe Marinovsky
- Categories: Kfar Chabad, Chabad-Lubavitch, Moshiach
- Frequency: Weekly
- Founder: Yosef Yitzchok Gopin Rabbi Aharon Dov Halperin
- Founded: 1980
- Country: Israel
- Based in: Kfar Chabad
- Language: Hebrew
- Website: www.kcm.co.il

Kfar Chabad is a weekly magazine, bearing the name of the settlement it is published in; Kfar Chabad. The magazine was established in 1980 by Yosef Yitzchok Gopin and Rabbi Aharon Dov Halperin. After printing the 7th issue, Rabbi Halperin was instructed by the Rebbe to leave his job as a teacher at a Talmud Torah and work on the magazine full-time. COLLive describes that magazine as the "mouthpiece of the Chabad-Lubavitch movement in Israel". The Rebbe edited Sichos for publication in the magazine.

The magazine contains profiles, interviews, articles on Jewish law, correspondence from the Rebbe, pieces on Chabad philosophy; and Hayom Yom. It serves as a platform for rabbinical leaders and Jewish officials to voice their opinions and has had interviews with Israeli chief rabbis and Israeli prime ministers.

In the 1980 the magazine took multiple political positions, opposing the Who is a Jew? immigration laws, only halachic conversions. The magazine also advocated for Shleimus Haaretz avoiding land concessions to Palestinians and spoke against Haredi groups critical of the Rebbe and Chabad.

In May 2009, the Chabad Rabbinical Court ruled declaring the magazine an institution of the Lubavitcher Rebbe and that "every Chabad follower must do everything possible to help distribute it". In July of 2009, the publication skipped a week after running into financial difficulties due to a decreasing number of subscribers, this was the second skipped week of that year. In October 2011 the magazine published a digital copy online for the first time. In 2013, Rabbi Aaron Dov Halperin was serving as editor-in-chief and in March the 1,500th issue was published. During the COVID-19 pandemic, Kfar Chabad opened its digital magazine, usually reserved to subscribers, to all viewers. Today, the publication functions as the official Chabad-Lubavitch weekly full-color magazine in Israel. It is the longest-running weekly Chabad magazine

== See also ==
- Kfar Chabad
- Chabad affiliated organizations
- Menachem Mendel Schneerson
