= Chabad messianism =

Belief that Menachem Mendel Schneerson is the Jewish messiah

Messianism in Chabad (Hebrew: משיחיות בחב"ד) refers to the belief within some of the Chabad-Lubavitch community—a prominent group within Hasidic Judaism—regarding the Jewish Messiah (Hebrew: מָשִׁיחַ, mashiach or moshiach). Central to this belief is the conviction that Rabbi Menachem Mendel Schneerson, the seventh Rebbe of the Chabad-Lubavitch dynasty, is the awaited Messiah and is leading the Jewish people into the Messianic Age.

== History ==
The concept of the Messiah is central to Judaism, representing an anticipated savior and bringer of universal peace and justice. Expected to restore Israel and gather in the Jewish diaspora, the Messiah is often linked to the Davidic lineage as foretold in the Hebrew Bible. Over centuries, beliefs about the Messiah have shaped Jewish thought, prayer, and tradition, reflecting a deep longing for spiritual fulfillment and communal restoration. The belief among Hasidic Jews that the leader of their dynasty could be the Jewish Messiah is traced to the Baal Shem Tov—the founder of Hasidism. During Schneerson's life, some Chabad members hoped he would be revealed as the Messiah, with the idea gaining attention inside and outside the movement during his final years. A few years before his death, a group within Chabad formed around their expressed belief that Schneerson was, indeed, the foretold Messiah, becoming known as mishichists (משיחיסטס, 'messianists'). A typical statement of belief for Chabad messianists is found in the song "Long live our Lord" (יחי אדונינו, Yekhi Adoneinu), which is also chanted as a refrain. Customs vary among messianists as to when the phrase is recited.

Since Schneerson's death in 1994, some followers of Chabad have persisted in believing in him as the Messiah. Some Chabad messianists believe Schneerson will be resurrected from the dead to be revealed as the Messiah; others profess that Schneerson did not die in 1994 and is waiting to be revealed as the Messiah. After Schneerson's death, a halakhic ruling from some Chabad-affiliated rabbis declared that it was "incumbent on every single Jew to heed the Rebbe's words and believe that he is indeed King Moshiach, who will be revealed imminently". Outside of Chabad messianism, both in mainstream Chabad and in broader Judaism, these claims are rejected.

The concept of a Jewish Messiah as a leader who would be revealed and mark the end of Jewish exile is a traditional Jewish belief. Additionally, it was not uncommon to attribute this messianic identity to various historic Jewish leaders. An early example of this type of belief is found in the Talmud, where various living sages are considered to be the Messiah.

Treatment of this topic in Jewish law is not common to Jewish legal texts, with the exception of the writings of Maimonides. Maimonides delineated rabbinic criteria for identifying the Jewish Messiah as a leader who studies Torah, observes the mitzvot, compels the Jews to observe the Torah, and fights the Wars of God. Additionally, the status of Messiah may be determined first through a presumptive status (b'chezkat mashiach) and later a verified status (mashiach vadai).

The concept of the Messiah is also prominent in Hasidism. In a notable incident, the founder of Hasidism, Rabbi Israel Baal Shem Tov, recounts a vision of an encounter with the Messiah, who relates to him how the Messiah's arrival may be hastened. Yehuda Eisenstein records in his book Otzer Yisrael that followers of Hasidic Rebbes will sometimes express hope that their leader will be revealed as the awaited Messiah. According to research by Israeli scholar Rachel Elior, there was a focus on messianism in Chabad during the lifetime of the sixth Lubavitcher Rebbe, Yosef Yitzchak Schneersohn, the father-in-law of Menachem Schneerson. The upsurge in messianic belief among Chabad adherents began in the 1980s, when followers of Menachem Schneerson started believing that he would be the Messiah, a hope initially kept quiet until the early 1990s. Additionally, the hope for the leader to be the awaited Messiah also involved Menachem Schneerson, who spoke of his deceased father-in-law as the awaited Messiah.

== Schneerson's positions and responses ==
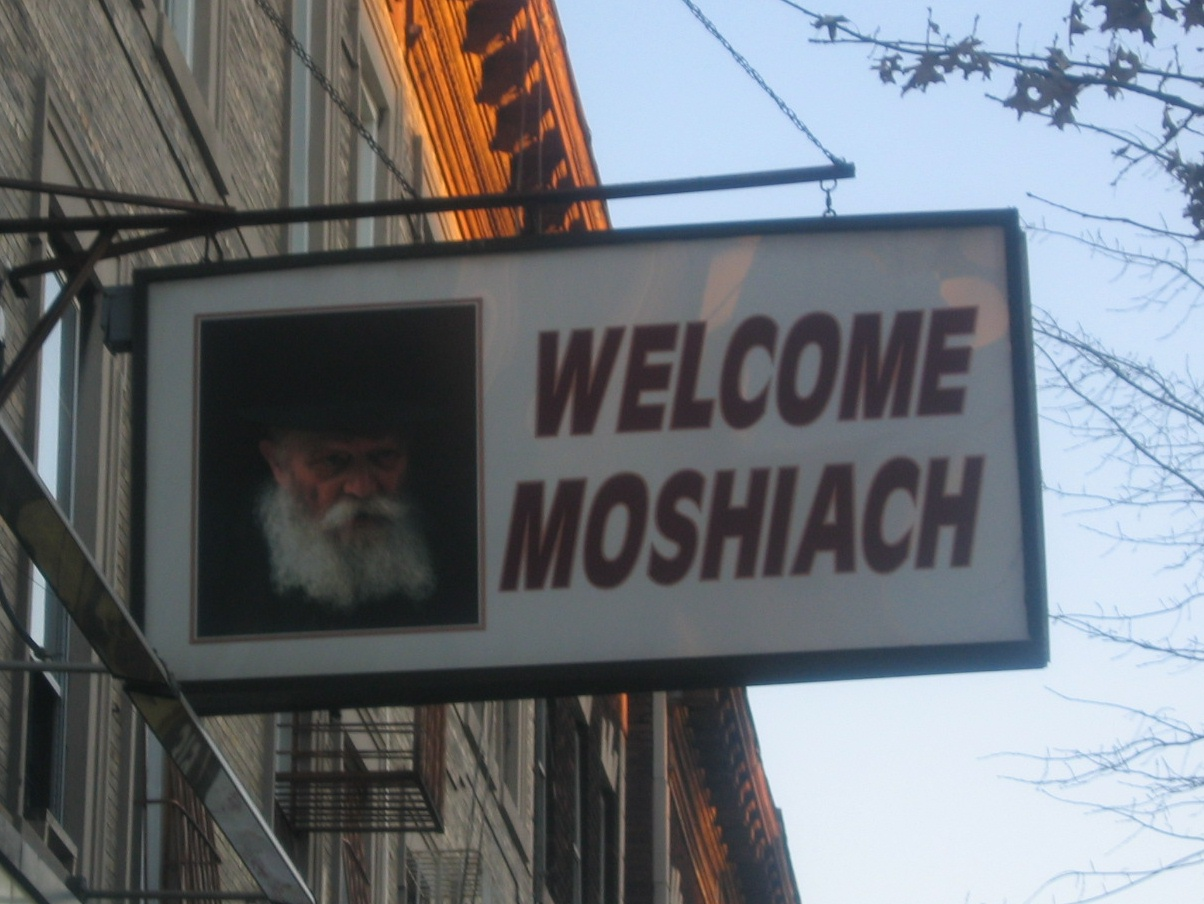
A sign welcoming the Moshiach in Crown Heights

Beginning with his very first farbrengen as Rebbe, Schneerson spoke of this generation's mission to complete the Dira Betachtonim, and urged everyone to do all within their power to help the world reach its ultimate state of perfection, when godliness and goodness will be naturally apparent and prevalent, with the final redemption. Schneerson would finish almost every public talk of his with a prayer for the imminent arrival of the Messiah. As early as the 1970s, he sought to raise awareness of the Messianic Age by encouraging people to learn and become knowledgeable in the laws of the Holy Temple, laws that will be applicable only when the Messiah actually comes. Schneerson would frequently quote the many sages who stated that this generation was the last generation of the exile and would be the first generation of redemption and would quote Yisrael Meir Kagan (Chofetz Chaim) and others, who stated that actively asking for the Messiah's coming is crucial.

Early efforts by Chabad Hasidim to refer to Schneerson as the Jewish Messiah resulted in strong opposition from Schneerson. In 1965, in what is likely the first record of Chabad Hasidim referring to Schneerson in messianic terms, a Hasid in Israel named Avraham Parizh printed and distributed letters that spoke of Schneerson as the Jewish Messiah. In response, Schneerson reportedly telegrammed Parizh in Israel stating that he strongly objected to the disseminated letter and requested that Parizh cease its distribution. Schneerson also reportedly instructed Parizh to recover all the distributed copies of the letter and confirm its collection.

In 1984, another Israeli Hasid, Shalom Dov Wolpo, raised the issue publicly by publishing a booklet identifying Schneerson as the Messiah. Schneerson reportedly responded by banning the publication and forbidding Wolpo from involvement with any related efforts. Schneerson publicly denounced these actions several times, saying that those involved in such publications were creating new opposition to the Chabad movement, and that he wished to never have to speak about the topic again. On Shabbat Bereshit, when Wolpo began singing a song that had become popular in Chabad which referred to Schneerson as the Messiah, Schneerson abruptly stopped the singing and ordered that it never be sung again. Wolpo would later argue that despite the Rebbe's strong opposition, all Chabad Hasidim must still consider and proclaim the Rebbe as the Jewish Messiah, arguing that the rebbe also declined to be called 'rebbe' in earlier years, only accepting the title later, because the time had not yet come.

Eventually the rebbe appeared to reverse his ban, and soon after began encouraging publicly a song identifying him as the Messiah, going so far as to authorize one of Wolpo's articles to be translated and published in a newspaper. Wolpo would argue that the precept of the acceptance of the Jewish Messiah is an act that must be performed by the Jewish people and not by the Messiah himself.

In 1988, after Schneerson called for Chabad rabbis to issue a Jewish legal ruling (psak din) to declare that the Jewish Messianic Era must commence, a Hasid named Yitzchak Hendel issued a ruling stating that Schneerson was the rightful Jewish Messiah. In response to the ruling, Schneerson did not protest and actually stated that "Hendel is competent rabbi who knows what he's talking about". It was not until April 1991 that Schneerson began openly encouraging the 'yechi' song identifying him as the Messiah.

In the late 1980s and early 1990s, Schneerson's talks became increasingly focused on the topic of Moshiach, that Moshiach was about to come, and what was needed to accomplish this. A statement of this kind by Schneerson was the view that the Jews living in the modern age were the last generation to live in exile (galut) and the first generation of redemption (geulah). On 2 November 1991, during the Rebbe's talk at the International Conference of Shluchim (emissaries), he stated that their work had been completed and the only task that remained was to welcome the Messiah. In the early 1990s, Hasidim became more vocal about Schneerson being the Moshiach, even submitting a petition to him asking that he reveal himself as the long-awaited Messiah. On one occasion in 1991, as the Rebbe was leaving the evening prayers when traditionally someone would start a song and the Rebbe would encourage it on his way out of the synagogue, some Hasidim began singing one of the Rebbe's favorite lively songs, adding the words of Yechi – "Long live our master, our teacher, our Rebbe, King Moshiach." A few months later, a few people did muster the courage to start singing at an intermission in a Shabbos farbrengen a less overt song that implied that the Rebbe was the Messiah. Within a few seconds the Rebbe heard it and immediately became very grave and said: "Really, I should get up and leave [the room]. Even if some people consider it is not respectful that I need to [be the one to leave], I don’t need to reckon with the views of a small number when [what they are saying] is the opposite of reality. However, first of all, it will unfortunately not help anyway. Secondly, it will disrupt the shevet achim gam yachad (brethren to dwell together in unity), for if I were to leave, others will leave, too."

In 1992, a journalist from Israel said to the Rebbe, "We appreciate you very much, we want to see you in Israel; you said soon you will be in Israel, so when will you come?" The Rebbe responded: "I also want to be in Israel." The journalist insisted, "So when, when will you come?" The Rebbe responded, "That depends on the Moshiach, not on me." The journalist persisted, "You are the Moshiach!" to which the Rebbe responded, "I am not." In 1991, Rabbi Dovid Nachshon received a bottle of vodka from the Rebbe for his effort of getting people to sign a declaration accepting the Rebbe's kingship. After Rabbi Nachshon announced (as customary) what the bottle was for, he announced the words of 'Yechi' declaring the rebbe "King Moshiach" three times. The Rebbe responded by saying "Amen".

One explanation for the apparent contradictions in the Rebbe's responses is that the Rebbe only took issue when this idea was published, but made nothing of it when addressed to him in private.

However, in 1993, after the Rebbe was no longer speaking following his stroke, the Rebbe responded to the "Yechi" chant almost daily during the course of that year by nodding his head and moving his arm, including on live television in 1993. In addition, the Rebbe allowed himself to be referred to as "The Rebbe King Moshiach, May He Live Forever" for the first time, in a book titled "Besurat HaGeulah" that was first published in 1993.

Many Hasidim felt that Menachem Mendel Schneerson is the mashiach of the generation, even though he never said so himself. As the years went on, and descriptions of Schneerson as being toweringly unique, a Rebbe of truly unprecedented and universally recognized stature, spread ever further, this messianic speculation spread to greater numbers and higher volume than in previous generations. The Hasidim became vocal of their hope that Schneerson would be the Messiah. As Schneerson's passion about the need for Messiah became more well-known, criticism also built up. In 1980, a group of children from a Chabad summer camp composed a song with the words "am yisrael [nation of Israel] have no fear, Moshiach will be here this year, we want Moshiach now, we don’t want to wait." Schneerson seems to have received great satisfaction from the children's initiative, and encouraged their song. According to a report in Time magazine, Rabbi Adin Even-Yisrael said he wished that Schneerson was “the most likely person on the scene now” to become the Messiah. According to a 1988 The New York Times report: Rabbi Yehuda Krinsky speculated that Schneerson was the most suitable candidate for Jewish Messiah. Some Chabad Hasidim took their message to the streets with billboards declaring that it was time for the Messiah to come and bring the redemption.

In light of some criticism about the insistent tone of these words, on one occasion Schneerson explained:

This has always been the hope and yearning of the Jewish people – that the Messiah should come now, immediately. Therefore it is inappropriate for someone to say that he does not want, or that he does not agree, or that he is not comfortable that people are imploring 'we want moshiach now.' Each Jew clearly prays and pleads three times a day in the amida, while standing before the Al-mighty (at that time a person is certainly speaking the truth, and saying what he means) et tzemach David avdecha me’hera tatzmiach [that we merit the final redemption and coming of the Messiah speedily], and then continues ki lishuatcha kivinu kol hayom, that he hopes for this the entire day!

Schneerson urged and talked about purifying all parts of the world through Torah and mitzvot (commandments) in order to bring mashiach. Many times he would weep publicly about the deep slumber and exile we are in, and how urgent it is that God redeem us, both for our sake as well as even for His own. Nevertheless, criticism of his passion about the coming of the Messiah and his urging people to do all they could to bring about the redemption by adding in the observance of Torah and mitzvot, was something that was known to him. On one occasion he even remarked "I have merited that the complaint people have against me is that I am passionate about the Mashiach."

== Illness and intensification ==
On 2 March 1992, while praying at the Ohel, the burial site of his father-in-law, Schneerson suffered a massive stroke. That very evening, while he was being treated for his stroke and Chabad Hasidim around the world gathered for prayer, some of the messianists broke out in song and dance. It was during this period of illness and inability to communicate that the messianic movement reached its greatest fervor, and became more vocal of their hope that Schneerson would soon be the mashiach. This also troubled many people who felt that it was being imposed upon Schneerson as something he had no control over.

By late 1992, a movement to formally crown Schneerson as Messiah gained prominence. Shmuel Butman announced his plan to crown the Rebbe. The Rebbe, who had been paralyzed and speechless since March the previous year, would join the daily prayers on a special balcony that was built for him to easily be wheeled. Butman planned to crown the Rebbe on 30 January 1993, after the evening prayers. However, when the Rebbe was nudged by Krinsky not to attend the planned event, he communicated to his secretaries Leibel Groner and Yudel Krinsky that he would only attend for the usual evening service. Both Groner and Krinsky, then followed by Butman, announced that the event was actually not a coronation and should not be intended as such.

== Death ==
On 3 Tammuz (12 June) 1994, more than two years after the stroke that left him paralyzed, the Rebbe died. His death left the Chabad community, much of the Jewish world, and even beyond, in mourning. From all over the world, people streamed to New York to participate in the funeral. The New York Times placed six articles about the Rebbe in the paper that week. Television devoted many hours of broadcast time to Schneerson's death. The New York Times reported from the funeral that the death had left many Jews stunned: "Not all of Rabbi Schneerson's followers were Hasidim. Conservative and Reform Jews were among his greatest supporters." However, his view was not shared by all. Some of the messianists were so caught up with their hope, that they interpreted each new erosion in the Rebbe's health, and ultimately his very death, as stages in the messianic process. They cited various midrashic statements to fuel their ecstasy as to the imminent revelation of the Messiah, and some of them drank and toasted l’chaim and danced before and during the funeral – an act that shocked many admirers of Schneerson across the Jewish world. In the days after Schneerson's death, many journalists and pundits wrote that they expected the end of the movement. For many Chabad followers, the death of the Rebbe was extremely painful. He was laid to rest next to his father-in-law, at the Ohel, at the Montefiore cemetery in Queens. In Jewish tradition, significant dates are frequently referred to by their Hebrew characters. Chabad (like other Jewish movements) dating back to their first Rebbe, Shneur Zalman of Liadi, dates of all their Rebbes' deaths by Hebrew dates. Thus, in the case of Schneerson, the anniversary of his death became known as Gimmel Tammuz (the third of Tammuz). In the week after the Rebbe's death, the Wisconsin Chronicle editorialized and wrote how many Jews now find it difficult to believe that Messiah will ever come: "Most modern Jews can't help but shrug at some claims that Schneerson is, or was, the most likely candidate in our time to be the Messiah, the King David-descended redeemer who according to tradition will inaugurate the final age of world peace and plenty. But when the Messiah does come, that personality likely will have much in common with Rabbi Menachem M. Schneerson."

== Chabad messianism after Schneerson's death ==
For many hopeful, often vocal, followers, Schneerson's death did not rule out the hope that he could still be the moshiach. There are Talmudic and halakhic sources that speak of the possibility that a righteous Jewish leader could be resurrected to become the mashiach. These positions, although not well-known, figure quite prominently and early in authentic Judaic sources. The Babylonian Talmud states: "If he [the Messiah] is among the dead, he is someone like Daniel." In fact, the most well-known deceased figure identified as being able to be the Messiah in rabbinic literature is King David. The Jerusalem Talmud states: "The Rabbis say, who is King Messiah? If he is from the living, David is his name, if he is from the deceased, David is still his name." According to Moses Margolies, a commentator on the Jerusalem Talmud known as the Pnei Moshe, the Talmud rules that: "If he [the Messiah] is among the living, David will be his name, and if he is from among the dead, he is David himself".

Some object to the notion that mashiach will be someone who had once lived, died and was then resurrected, based on what Maimonides writes: "Even if one is worthy of being Mashiach, if he is killed it is certain that he is not Mashiach." Messianists counter that Maimonides does not disagree with both sources in the Talmud, rather the Talmud speaks of one who has died a natural death, while Maimonides excludes only one who was killed. This can be evidenced in his deliberate wording "if he (the potential Messiah) failed or was killed", while specifying the likes of Bar Kochba "was killed (in war) because of sins" and Yeshua of Nazareth who "was executed by the court".

== Positions within Chabad ==
The view of Schneerson as Messiah is not advocated in Chabad's centralized and official literature. According to a Chabad spokesman in 2014, Chabad-Lubavitch leaders have "repeatedly condemned them [messianists] in the strongest possible terms". Journalist Sue Fishkoff notes that the idea that most Lubavitchers are messianist is "a claim that is patently absurd. Here everyone is treading on thin ice, for no one can know precisely how deep Chabad messianism goes. When [David] Berger and other critics claim that it affects the majority of the Chabad movement, they have no greater statistical backing than do those who suggest it is on the decline.".

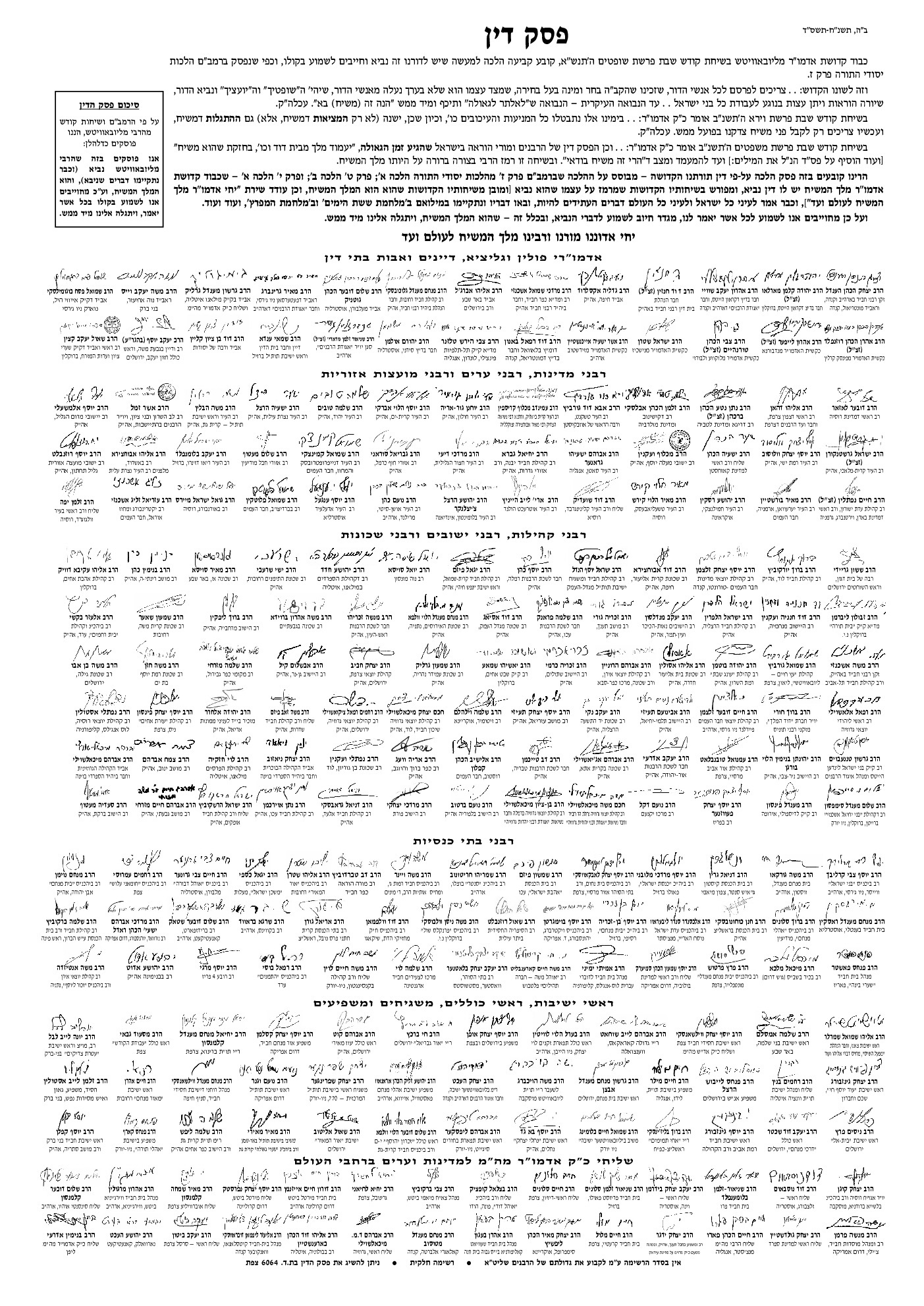
Ruling signed by over 100 rabbis declaring the Lubavitcher Rebbe to be Moshiach

=== Meshichists ===
Messianics – Subsequent to Schneerson's death, vocal messianists have continued to proclaim that Schneerson is still alive. Some of them argue that just as the Talmud states that "Jacob did not die", a teaching that carries great nuanced significance in kabbalistic thought, so too "Schneerson did not die". Among religious Jews, reference to one who has died is followed by expressions such as alav hashalom or zechuto yagen alenu. Messianists do not use such terms when writing of Schneerson. Some messianists have even continued to use terms that indicate that Schneerson is still alive such as shlita. Many group members are vocal Israeli youth, particularly those educated in the city of Safed. There are also members of the messianic camp within the Crown Heights community and elsewhere who share these views. These individuals can usually be identified by the small yellow pin, known as the Moshiach flag, worn on their lapel (or hat), and the Hebrew words of "Yechi" emblazoned on their kippot. Since Schneerson's death, Beis Moshiach magazine has been a major organ for views within this camp of the messianist. Between the years 1998–2004, the messianists have garnered support from rabbis to issue a rabbinic ruling supporting their messianic claims. These views have led to much controversy and condemnation. Between the years 1998–2004, a rabbinic ruling supporting the messianic claim that the Rebbe is the mashiach was issued and signed by over 100 rabbis.

=== Anti-Meshichists ===
Anti-Messianics – Regardless of Schneerson's death, the majority of Chabad Hasidim continue to see him as the most righteous Jewish leader of the time, the nasi hador, whose influence throughout the world remains very palpable. They acknowledge that he died, visit his grave and observe yahrtzeit. They tend to place little or no emphasis on whether or not the Schneerson will be mashiach. Instead they focus on the practical aspects of Schneerson's vision of making the world a better place. They are aware of Schneerson's negative reactions when people tried making Messianic claims about him, and are acutely aware of how much Schneerson, their tzaddik ha'dor and their moshiach sh'b'dor, expects of them to accomplish both in the realm of their own personal service of God, in helping to bring the beauty of Judaism to Jews, and to spread the beauty of monotheism to the world at large. They hold that they have no way of knowing who will be the Moshiach, although they may wish that it will be Schneerson.

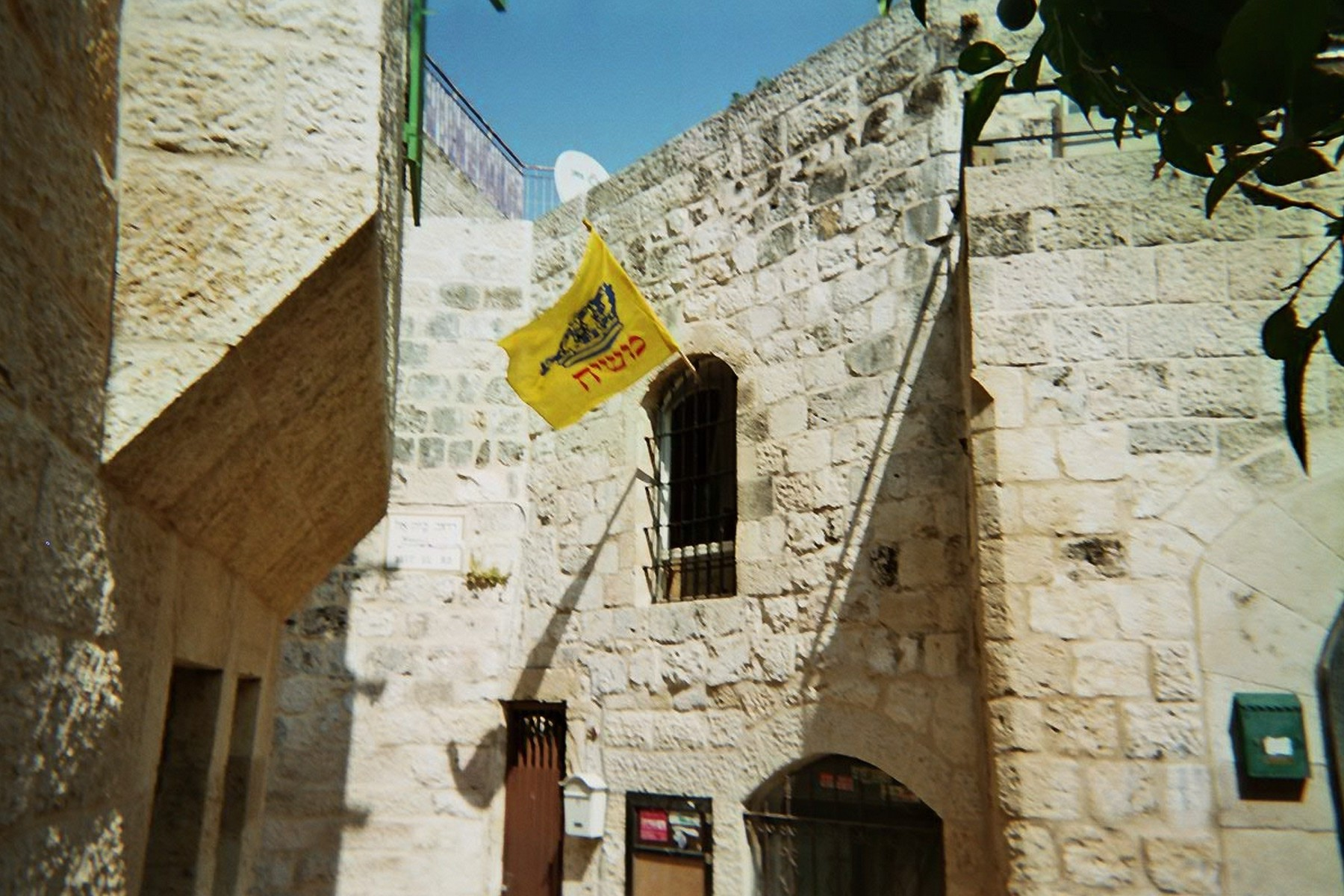
The Messianist flag in Jerusalem

=== Other positions ===
According to some scholars, the messianist divisions in Chabad can be identified by various subtler factions of those who claim the Rebbe is not the Messiah but could have been as he had all the qualities of a Messiah prior to his death, whether the Rebbe was the Messiah and will be Messiah again once resurrected, whether the Rebbe is believed not to have died.

== Responses ==
=== Support ===
In 1998, a group of rabbis signed a Jewish legal ordinance (psak din) declaring Menachem Schneerson the Jewish Messiah. Its signatories include several non-Chabad Orthodox and Hasidic rabbis such as Ya'akov Yosef (affiliated with Shas), Aaron Leifer (Rabbi of Nadvorna-Safed), Eliyahu Shmuel Schmerler (Rosh Yeshiva of Sanz and member of the Mif'al Hashas), Ahron Rosenfeld of Pinsk-Karlin and Yaakov Menachem Rabinowitz of Biala.

=== Opposition ===
The reaction of Torah scholars to the idea that Schneerson could be the Messiah varied. During his life, numerous rabbis and Jewish leaders expressed their views that Menachem Mendel Schneerson had the potential to be the Messiah of the generation. There has been a general decline in that view since his death. Within three years, David Berger reports that "an overwhelming majority" of Rabbis criticized the belief.

Long time critics of Schneerson from Bnei Brak in Israel have been the most vocal in their criticism of Schneerson and Chabad. The most notable of these critics was Elazar Shach, the rosh yeshiva of the Ponevezh yeshiva. Shach was a known critic of Schneerson and the Chabad movement. He repeatedly attacked Schneerson and his followers on a number of issues, including messianism. When people became more vocal about the possibility of Schneerson being the Messiah, Shach advocated a complete boycott of Chabad. Other Bnei Brak leaders, including Chaim Shaul Karelitz, the former av bet din of the She'erit Yisrael Kashrut organization of Bnei Brak, and Yaakov Weinberg, a rosh yeshiva of Yeshivas Ner Yisroel, have also spoken negatively of those who wish Schneerson would be the Messiah.

In America, numerous Litvish leaning rabbanim have also spoken negatively of this form of messianism, including Elya Svei, Aharon Feldman, Shlomo Miller, Moshe Heinemann and Chaim Dov Keller, who all issued harsh criticism. Feldman, quoting Maimonides, states that "Even someone who is worthy of being Mashiach, if he is killed, it is certain that he is not Mashiach." Feldman claims that anyone that can believe that the last Lubavitcher Rebbe is worthy of being the Messiah has a "compromised judgment" and is "ignorant of Torah."

Other American Torah authorities, such as the Ungvarer Rav Menashe Klein, Moshe Heinemann, Yehuda Henkin, Chaim Brovender and Ahron Soloveichik argue that while there may be sources for messianism, it is a shtut (foolishness) that should not be followed. Soloveichik's own written statements on the issue have themselves been the focus of controversy. A 1996 letter signed by Soloveichik states that "Before the passing of the Rebbe, I included myself among those who believe that the Rebbe was worthy of being Moshiach. And I strongly believe that had we, particularly the Orthodox community, been united, we would have merited to see the complete Redemption. Insofar as the belief .. that the Rebbe can still be Moshiach, in light of the Gemara in Sanhedrin, the Zohar, Abarbanel, Kisvei Arizal, S’dei Chemed, and other sources, it cannot be dismissed." Soloveichik adds that "any cynical attempt at utilizing a legitimate disagreement of interpretation concerning this matter in order to besmirch and to damage the Lubavitch movement that was, and continues to be, at the forefront of those who are battling the missionaries, assimilation, and indifference, can only contribute to the regrettable discord that already plagues the Jewish community, and particularly the Torah community." In a letter from 2000, Soloveichik states that there have been those who have "persisted in stating that I validate their belief that a Jewish Messiah may be resurrected from the dead. I completely reject and vigorously deny any such claim. As I have already stated publicly ... My intent in signing the original letter ... was merely to express my opinion that we should not label subscribers to these beliefs as heretics."

From the Progressive streams of Judaism, responses include: David Hartman who expressed his concern about the developing messianism early on, while Schneerson was still alive, saying that "the outpouring of Messianic fervor is always a very disturbing development." Senior Reform rabbi and humanitarian activist Arthur Lelyveld was also critical of the messianist trends within the Chabad movement describing the organisation as having a "cult like" atmosphere.

=== Other ===
Aharon Lichtenstein, during a eulogy for the Rebbe at Yeshivat Har Etzion, spoke of the fact that people hoped that Schneerson could be the mashiach, saying that the prevalence of messianism in Chabad is a "serious problem" as it has "cast a shadow in recent years over the way that many people think of both the man and his movement."

Norman Lamm said of Schneerson that "If [people] believe the Rebbe could have been Moshiach, fine, I agree... He had a far better chance than most." Although once the Rebbe died, he did not see that as a possibility. Lamm also argued that messianists had misinterpreted Schneerson's statements to create a "distortion" leading to "moral nihilism." According to Lamm, open efforts to declare Schneerson the Messiah were not tolerated before his death: "When he was alive, no one would have dared to discuss this. But now it is easy for the messianically-oriented to distort the Rebbe's teachings".

=== Israeli Chief Rabbinate ===
Two incidents concern the Chief Rabbinate of Israel and the topic of Chabad messianism:

- 2000 pronouncement – In January 2000, the Chief Rabbinate of Israel released a statement regarding the issue of Schneerson being worthy of being the mashiach, and declarations made by messianists, saying that such declarations "confuse and mislead simple people". The statement continued to mention that the Chief Rabbinate "[has] no intention, God forbid, of diminishing the greatness and the global activities of the Rebbe of blessed memory."
- 2007 conversion case – A conversion case in 2007 of a man educated by Chabad messianists who wished to convert led to controversy, with two Israeli rabbis saying the messianic views were "beyond the pale of normative Judaism" and the man should therefore not be allowed to convert. The Chief Rabbinate ruled in favor of the conversion.

=== Position of Chabad organizational leadership ===
A 1996 statement from Agudas Chasidei Chabad said:

With regard to some recent statements and declarations by individuals and groups concerning the matter of Moshiach and the Lubavitcher Rebbe, Rabbi Menachem M. Schneerson, of sainted memory, let it be known that the views expressed in these notices are in no way a reflection of the movement's position. While we do not intend to preclude expressions of individual opinion, they are, in fact, misleading and a grave offense to the dignity and expressed desires of the Rebbe. The statement reads that "The Rebbe clearly inspired a heightened consciousness of Moshiach, one of Judaism's principles of faith, and towards this end, encouraged the study of the traditional sources concerning belief in Moshiach, the Redemption and its imminent fulfillment, as well as an increase in activities of goodness and kindness. This should be perpetuated by all, as we strive for a more perfect world and the fulfillment of the Rebbe's vision.

It continues:

Unfortunately, the Rebbe's words are now being distorted and quoted out of context by a numbered few. This reckless behavior, even if well intentioned, is antithetical in the extreme to all that Lubavitch represents as defined by the Rebbe. The Rebbe explicitly and emphatically advocated a thoughtful, respectful and responsible approach in this and related matters, and resolutely opposed such distorted pronouncements time after time, both publicly and privately.

A statement from Vaad Rabonei Lubavitch said:

Belief in the coming of Moshiach and awaiting his imminent arrival is a basic tenet of the Jewish faith. It is clear, however, that conjecture as to the possible identity of Moshiach is not part of the basic tenet of Judaism. The preoccupation with identifying the Rebbe (זי״ע) as Moshiach is clearly contrary to the Rebbe's wishes. Together with the whole of Klal Yisrael we pray for the fulfillment of our collective yearning for Moshiach, in the spirit of the timeless Jewish declaration: "I await his (Moshiach's) coming each and every day".

== Treatment in scholarship ==
Within sociology and anthropology, the Chabad identification of Schneerson as Messiah can be analyzed in terms of charismatic authority, a type of leadership developed by Max Weber. The process of identification of Schneerson as the Messiah may also be thought of as a contributing factor to the rationalization of the collective life of the Chabad community. Chabad messianism prompts community members to achieve the outreach goals set by the seventh rebbe, and it likely supports the Chabad's success as a modern charismatic enterprise that operates within a competitive market of religious goods. Chabad messianism is also a key factor to understanding the use of various digital and non-digital media by Chabad in religious outreach contexts. The group's use of digital media is described as an important ambition for its potential to reach global Jewish audiences, with the intention of rejuvenating religious observance among Jews around the world, itself a prerequisite for the Jewish messianic redemption.

Opposition to Chabad messianism may stem from the discomfort that the Jewish diaspora would face if a free and meaningful Jewish life were declared inadequate without the coming of a Messiah. However, the coming of Moshiach is basic to Judaism as Maimonides writes explicitly in his 13 Principles of Faith. This opposition appears constrained by the Jewish community's lack of hegemony in the areas of belief and heresy, and by Chabad and Hasidism's prior neutralization of the messianic impulse by focusing on individual spiritual fulfilment and redemption. Despite the controversy, Chabad messianism, whether it is deemed as heretical or not, does not appear to have resulted in the type of trauma or damage to the Jewish people as with the Sabbatean movement.

Opposition to Chabad messianism on theological grounds may also be traced to a tension within the Jewish tradition over the definition of Judaism as either a religion or an ethnicity. Orthodox Jewish polemics that challenge Chabad messianism on these grounds may be understood as an effort to revive the self-definition of Judaism as a religion and to impose a theological approach that emphasizes the categories of orthodoxy and heresy. While these efforts attempt to strengthen the border around Jewish identity, it is likely that once the initial phase passes, characterized by acute anxiety, the dogmatic formulations will begin to dissipate and the Jewish community returns to defining itself as something between a religion and an ethnicity.

== See also ==
- Moshiach flag
- Mateh Moshiach
- World Chabad Center for Greeting Moshiach
- Moshiach
