= Strasbourg Cathedral =

Cathedral located in Strasbourg, Alsace, France

Strasbourg Cathedral Cathedral of Our Lady of Strasbourg
- Cathédrale Notre-Dame de Strasbourg (French)
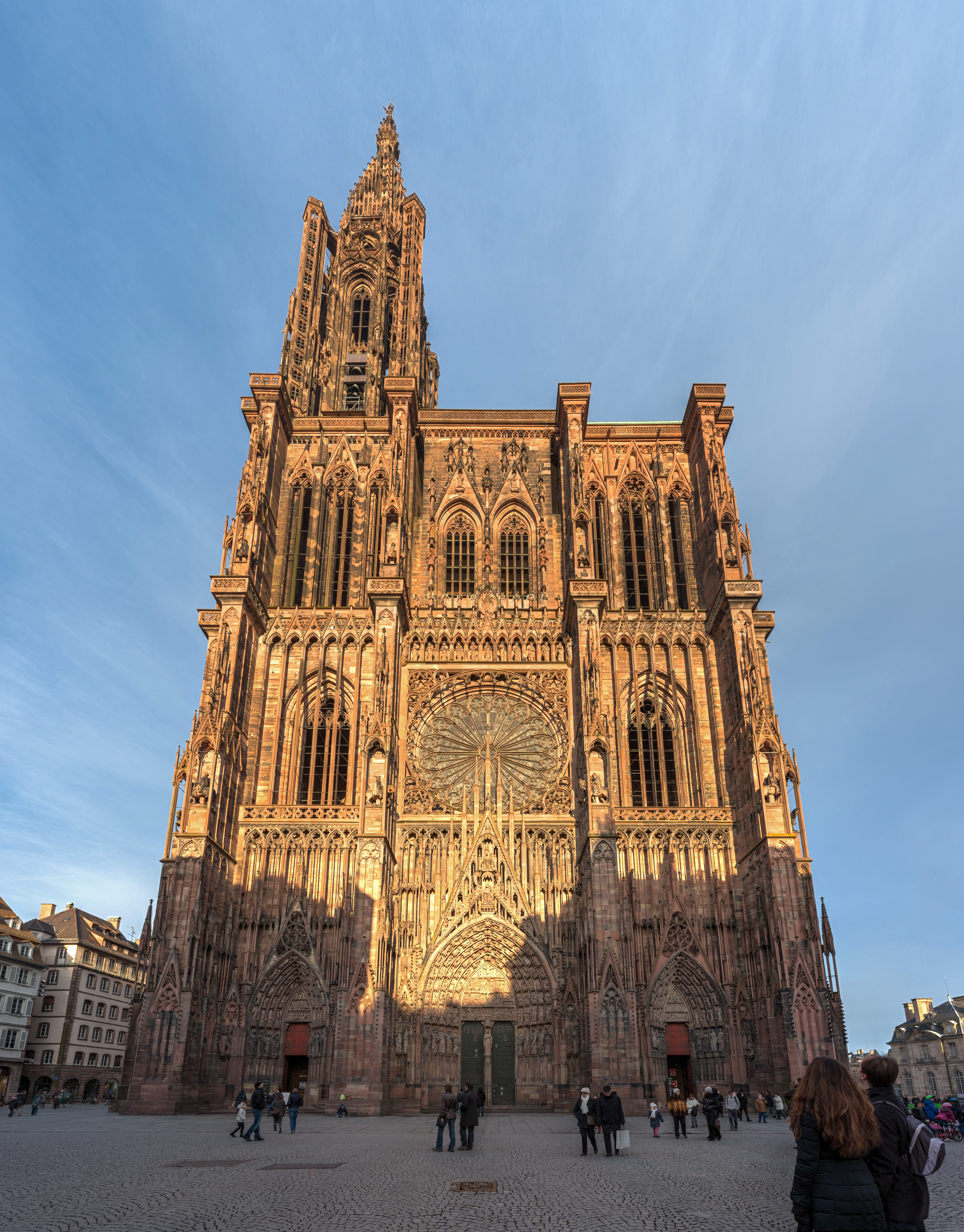
- Western facade, viewed from Place de la Cathédrale

- Location within France

Religion
- Affiliation: Catholic Church
- Diocese: Archdiocese of Strasbourg
- Rite: Roman
- Ecclesiastical or organisational status: Cathedral
- Leadership: Archbishop Pascal Michel Ghislain Delannoy
- Status: Active

Location
- Location: Strasbourg, France
- Coordinates: 48°34′54″N 7°45′03″E

Architecture
- Type: Church
- Style: Romanesque, Gothic
- Groundbreaking: 1015
- Completed: 1439

Specifications
- Direction of façade: Southwest
- Length: 112 metres (367 ft)
- Height (max): 32.6 metres (107 ft) (Nave)
- Dome: 1
- Dome height (outer): 58 m (190 ft)
- Spire: 1
- Spire height: 142 metres (466 ft)
- Materials: Sandstone
- Monument historique
- Official name: Cathédrale Notre-Dame de Strasbourg
- Designated: 1862
- Reference no.: PA00085015
- Denomination: Église

Website
- www.cathedrale-strasbourg.fr
- Building details

Record height
- Tallest in the world from 1647 to 1874^{[I]}
- Preceded by: St. Mary's Church, Stralsund
- Surpassed by: St. Nicholas Church, Hamburg

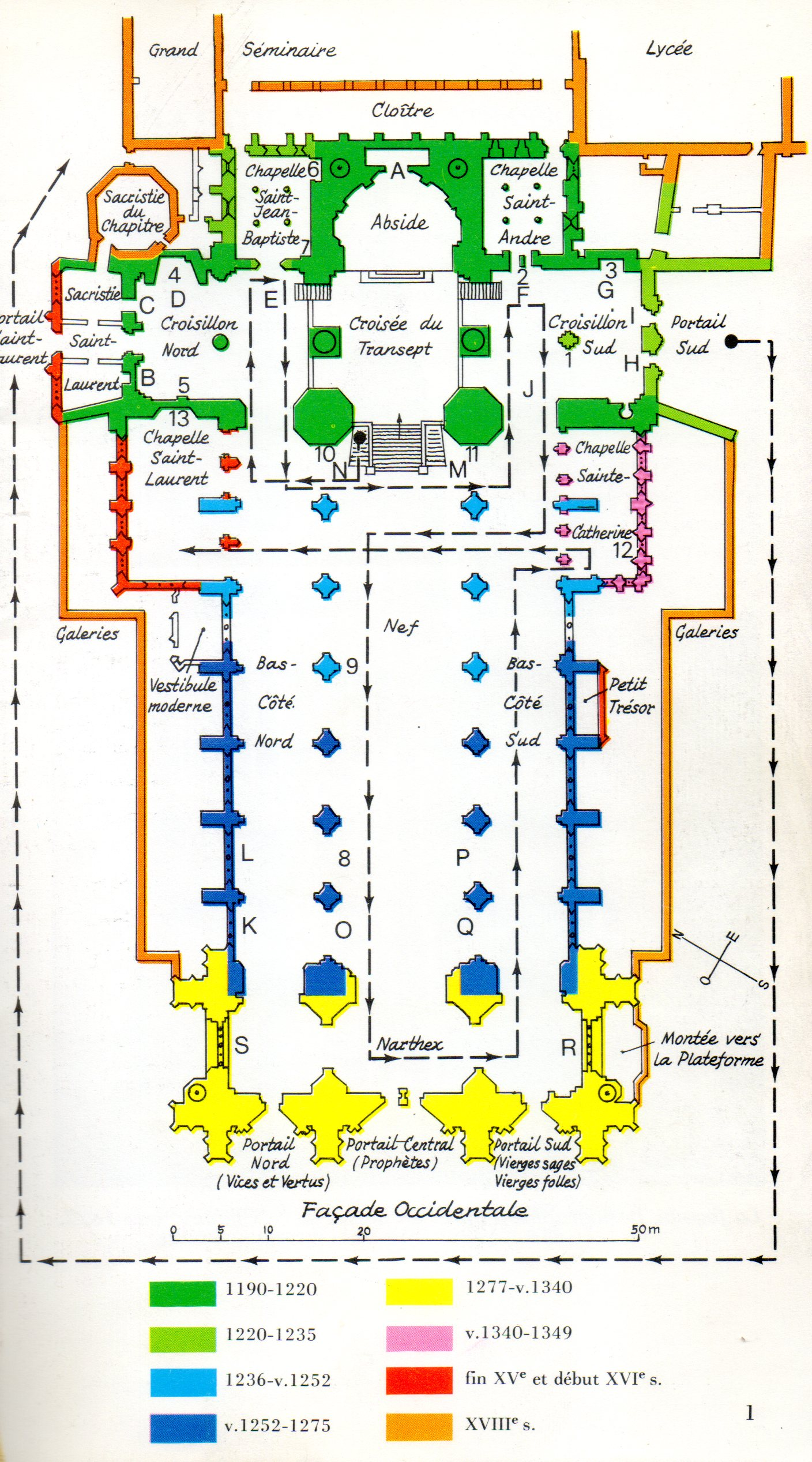
Plan of cathedral – different colors indicate dates of construction

Strasbourg Cathedral or the Cathedral of Our Lady of Strasbourg (French: Cathédrale Notre-Dame de Strasbourg, or Cathédrale de Strasbourg), is a Catholic cathedral in Strasbourg, Alsace, France. Although considerable parts of it are still in Romanesque architecture, it is widely considered to be among the finest examples of Rayonnant Gothic architecture. Architect Erwin von Steinbach is credited for major contributions from 1277 to his death in 1318, and beyond through his son Johannes von Steinbach, and his grandson Gerlach von Steinbach, who succeeded him as chief architects. The Steinbachs' plans for the completion of the cathedral were not followed through by the chief architects who took over after them, and instead of the originally envisioned two spires, a single, octagonal tower with an elongated, octagonal crowning was built on the northern side of the west facade by master Ulrich Ensingen and his successor, Johannes Hültz. The construction of the cathedral, which had started in the year 1015 and had been relaunched in 1190, was finished in 1439.

Standing in the centre of the Place de la Cathédrale, at 142 metres (466 feet), Strasbourg Cathedral was the world's tallest building from 1647 to 1874 (227 years), when it was surpassed by St. Nikolai's Church, Hamburg. Today it is the sixth-tallest church in the world and the tallest extant structure built entirely in the Middle Ages.

Described by Victor Hugo as a "gigantic and delicate marvel", and by Goethe as a "sublimely towering, wide-spreading tree of God", the cathedral is visible far across the plains of Alsace and can be seen from as far off as the Vosges Mountains or the Black Forest on the other side of the Rhine. The reddish-brown sandstone from the Vosges mountains gives the cathedral its distinctive colour.

The construction and maintenance of the cathedral has been supervised by the Fondation de l'Œuvre Notre-Dame ("Foundation of Our Lady") since at least 1224. The Musée de l'Œuvre Notre-Dame, a municipal museum located in the Foundation's buildings, displays original works of art from the cathedral, including sculptures and stained glass, as well as the plans for the original building.

In 1988, Strasbourg Cathedral was inscribed on the UNESCO World Heritage List along with the historic centre of the city (called the "Grande Île") because of its outstanding Gothic architecture.

== History ==
The history of Strasbourg's cathedral is well documented thanks to the archives of the Notre-Dame Foundation, the city of Strasbourg, and the archdiocese. Archaeological excavations below and around the cathedral have been conducted in 1896–1897, 1907, 1923–1924, 1947–1948, between 1966 and 1972, and finally between 2012 and 2014.

=== Previous buildings on the site ===
A Roman settlement called Argentoratum, twenty hectares in size, existed on the site since about 12 B.C., at a strategic point where bridges crossed the Rhine and two of its tributaries. It became a major trading center for wine, grain, and later for textiles and luxury products. Christianity was first imposed in 313 by the Edict of Constantine. The first recorded bishop, Amand, participated in the Councils of Cologne and Sardique in 346 and 347. A paleochristian church or cathedral is believed to have been founded by an edict of Clovis I, but its exact location and appearance is unknown.

The first cathedral built on the present site was erected by the bishop Saint Arbogast in about 550–575. Under Charlemagne, the Bishop Remi consecrated the altar and built a funeral crypt in about 778. This Carolingian church is believed to have had an apse flanked by two chapels and a nave covered with a wooden beamed roof, but no trace remains today.

=== The Romanesque Cathedral ===
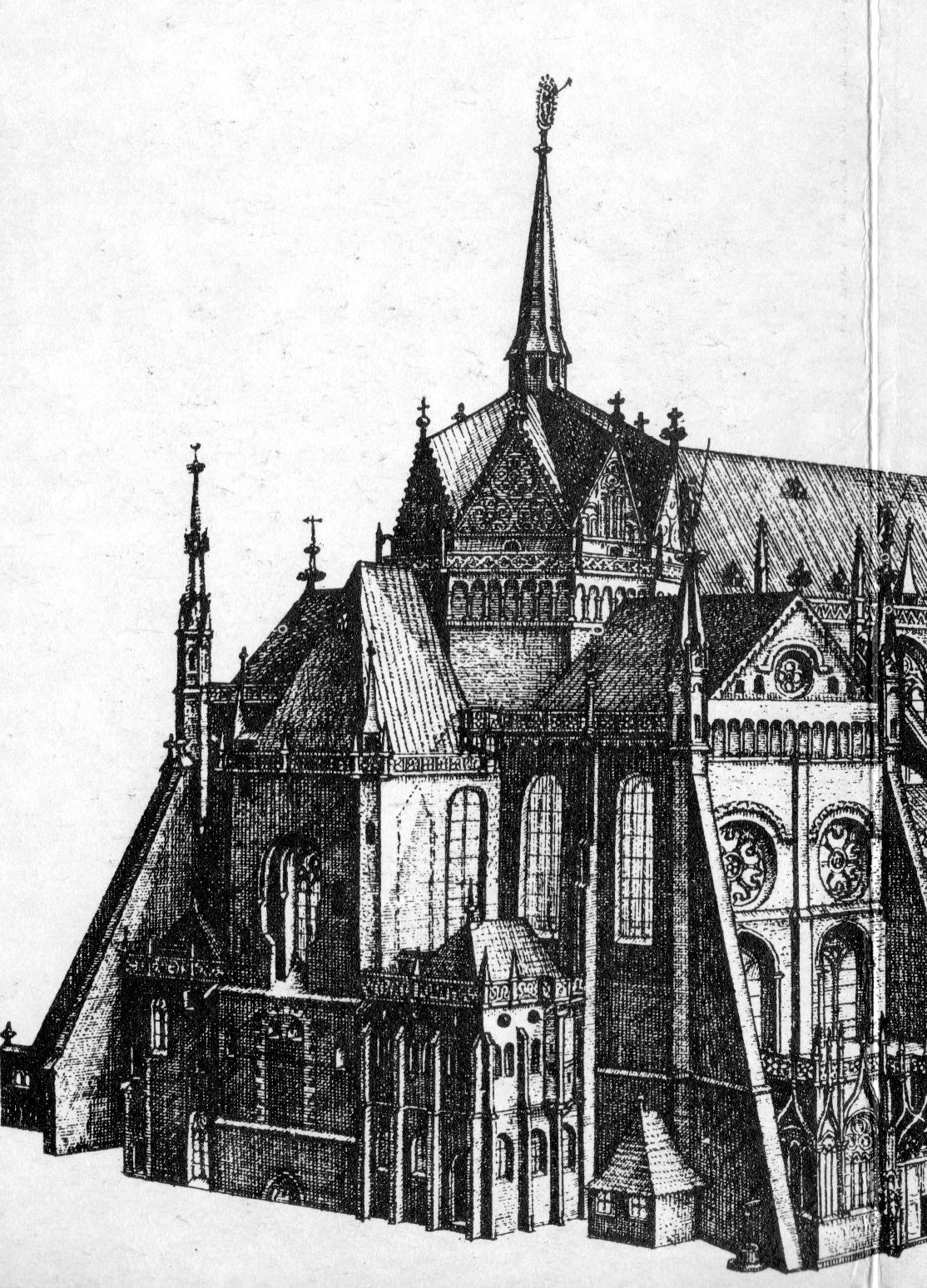
The Romanesque chevet of the cathedral, seen in 1671

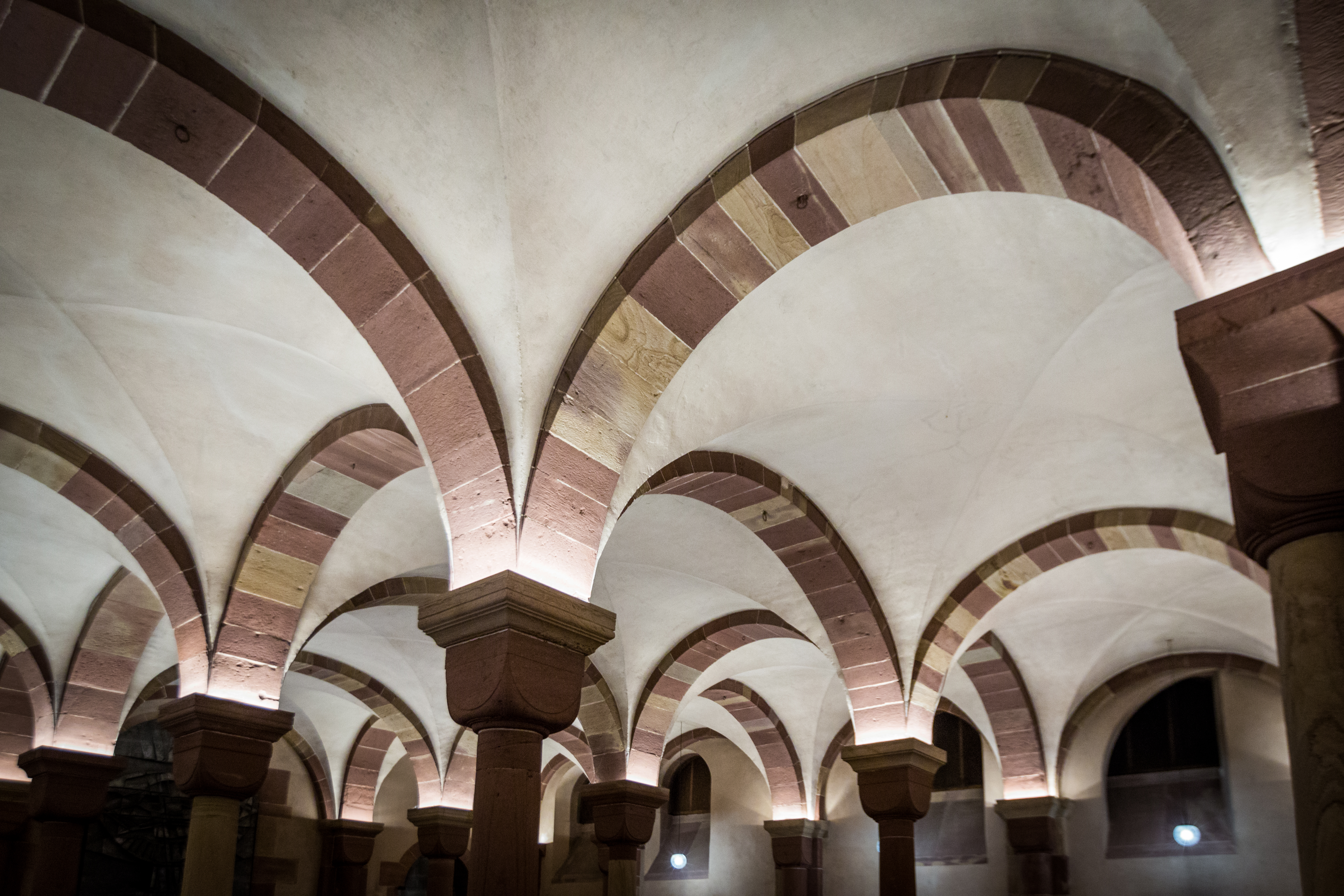
Vaults of the crypt

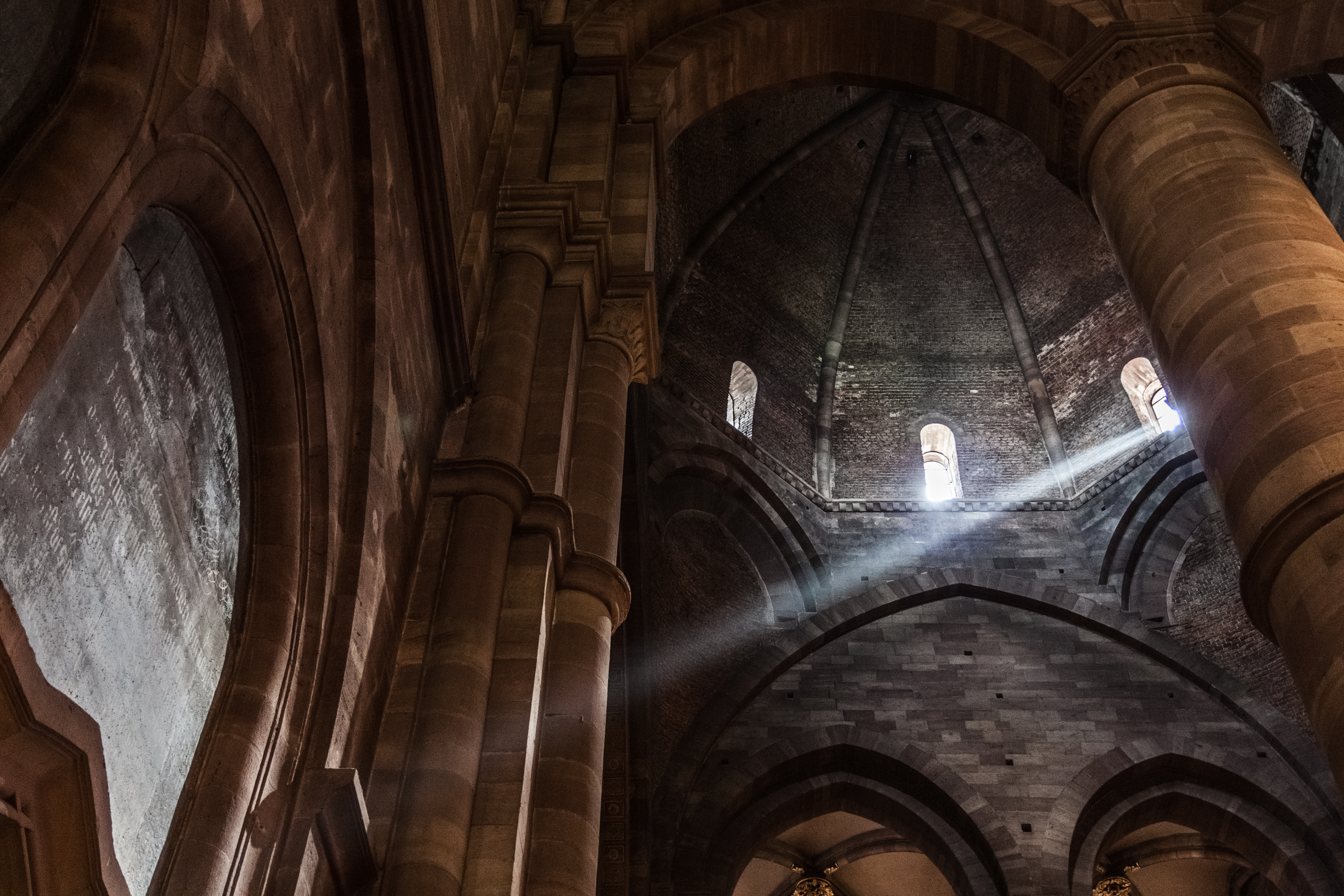
Romanesque pillars, vaults and squinches of the transept

In 1002, following the death of the Holy Roman Emperor Otto III, a battle broke out between his potential successors. When Bishop Werner I supported the winning candidate, Henry II of Germany, one of his Henry's rivals, Hermann of Germany, raided Strasbourg and burned down the cathedral. The Bishop appealed to the new emperor, who granted one eighth of his revenues in the province toward the construction of a new cathedral. In 1015, bishop Werner laid the first stone of a new cathedral on the foundations of the Carolingian church.

The new church was exceptionally large, just ten meters shorter than the present cathedral, and just ten meters narrower on its west front. The west front was also exceptional because it was flanked by two towers, the "harmonic" style which became common in Gothic cathedrals during the following century. The chevet, or east end, probably also had a tower, and was flanked by two chapels. The transept of the cathedral was 55 meters long, the same length as the nave and choir. The nave and choir were composed of three vessels, each with two traverses. The central vessel was higher than the two collaterals.

The new building, with its wooden roof beams, was unfortunately prone to fire; it suffered from fires in 1136, 1140,1150, and 1176. The church was repaired after each fire, and reconstructions and modifications made, but it retained its essentially Romanesque form, with thick walls, small windows and massive columns. Work on the church was frequently interrupted by wars and political crises.

=== The Romanesque-Gothic Cathedral ===
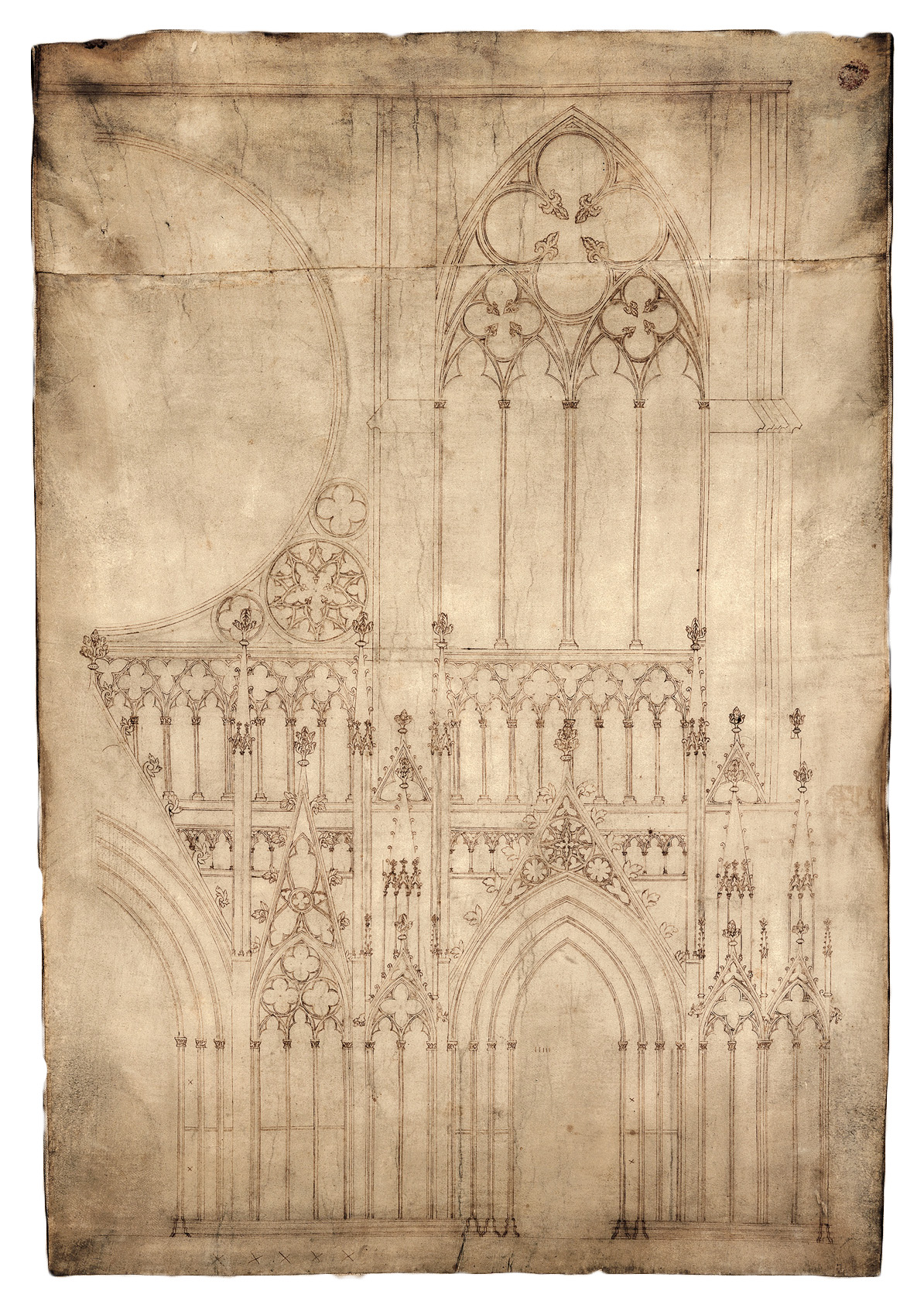
Drawing A′, c. 1260. One of the oldest surviving architectural drawings of the cathedral.

Bishop Heinrich I von Hasenburg (1181 – 25 March 1190) decided to construct a new cathedral, to be more beautiful than that of Basel Minster, which was just being finished. Construction of the new cathedral began on the foundations of the preceding structures. The original Romanesque crypt was kept and expanded westwards. The architects of the rebuilding began to include Gothic elements, following the style that had appeared in northern France in the 12th century, while still preserving the existing Romanesque features. Between 1200 and 1228, the Romanesque vaults of the north transept were replaced by pointed Gothic rib vaults, which were stronger and shifted the thrust of the weight outwards, reducing the need for massive pillars in the interior. This was then carried out in the south transept. The next major step toward Gothic took place with the raising of the vaults of the south transept, creating thinner walls and more space for high windows. The Gothic style also appeared in the statuary, particularly the Pillar of the Angels, and in the tympanums over the double portals on the south transept, which showed the influence of the sculpture in French Gothic cathedrals.

The next major step was the reconstruction of the nave, which took place between 1240 and 1274. The initial design was 27 metres high to the vaults, and the upper walls were filled with stained glass windows. The first bays were made in what was known as the Lorraine style, with two levels of four-light windows, traversed by a narrow passageway. However, between 1250 and 1255 the builders decided to become more ambitious, and followed the Rayonnant style; this created three levels with a total height of 32 metres to the vaults. The Gothic pillars of the new section were copied exactly from those of the Basilica of Saint Denis near Paris, the building where the new style had been developed.

=== Construction of the West Front (1277–1439) ===
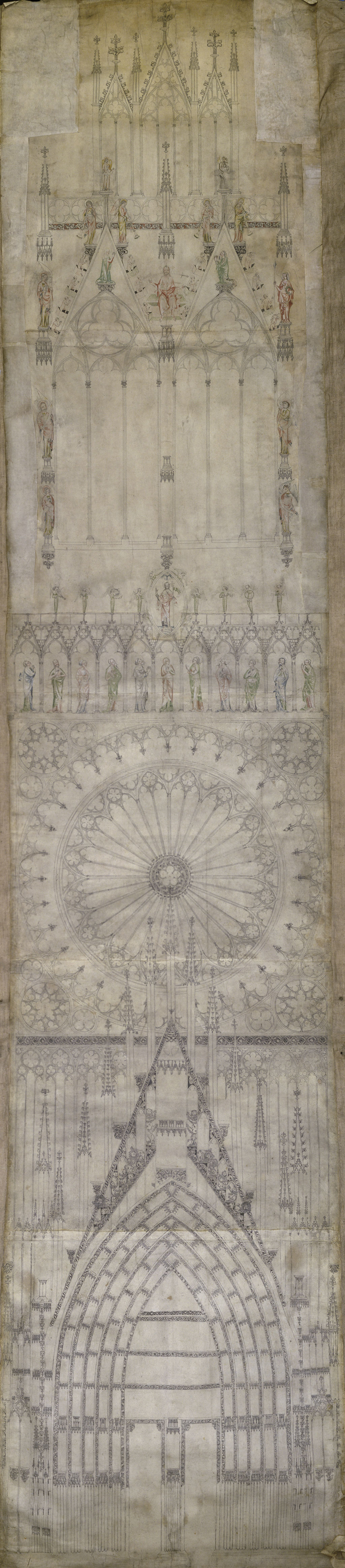
Gerlach von Steinbach: Drawing 5, a 1360s design for the west facade. The largest and most ornate surviving original architectural drawing of the cathedral. Height 405 cm (159 in), width 86 cm (34 in).

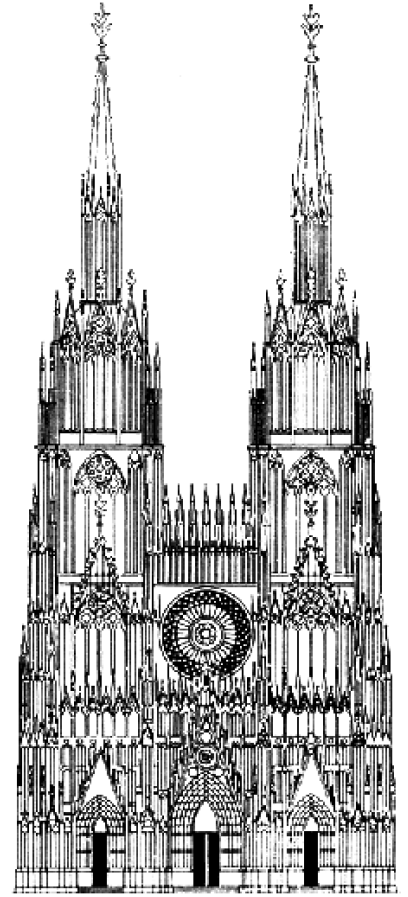
1277 plan for west front (Plan Riss B restitution)

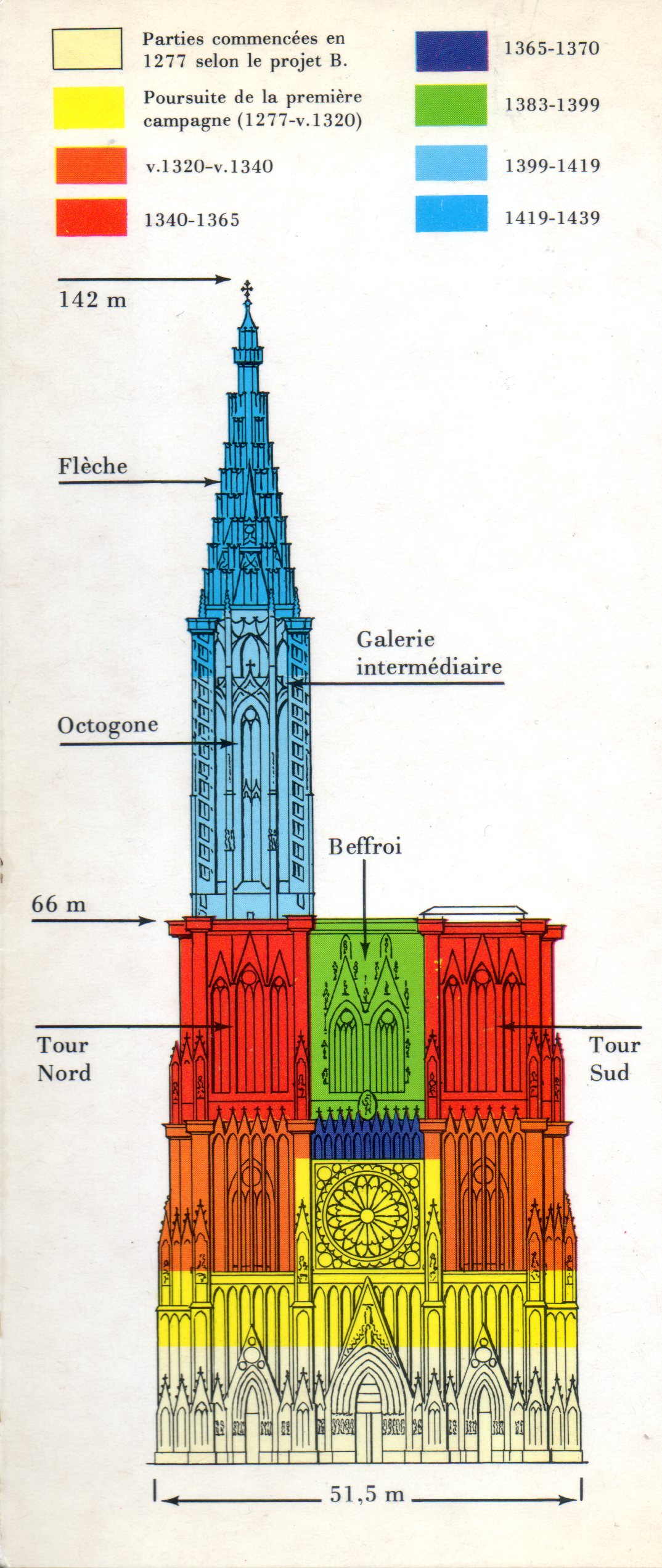
The different stages of the completion

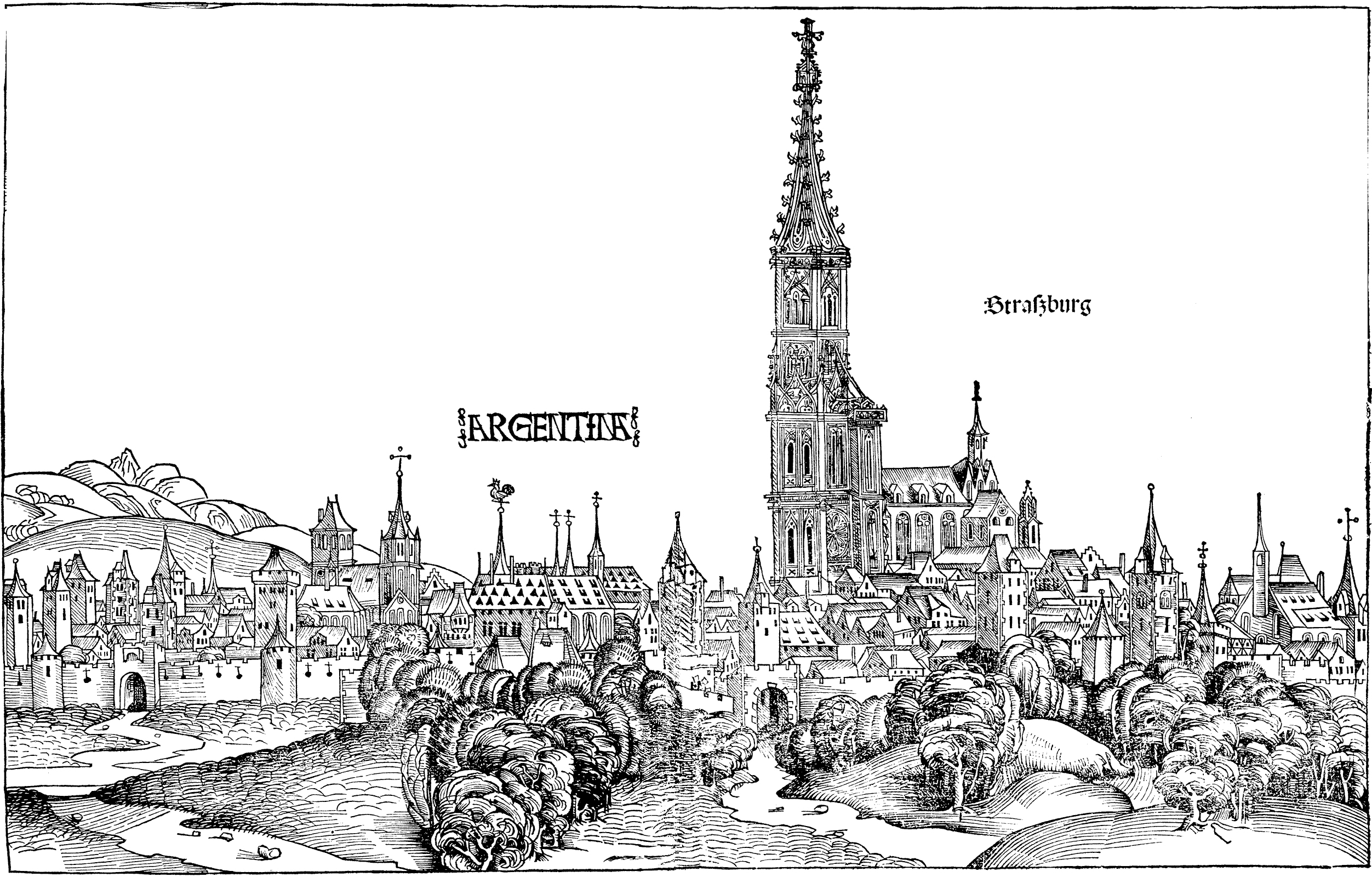
View of the cathedral in 1493

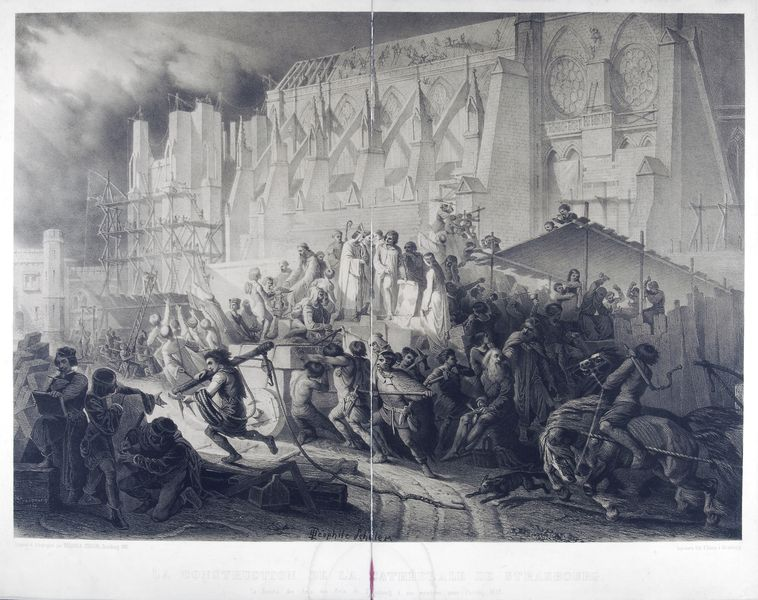
Construction of Strasbourg Cathedral, by Théophile Schuler, 1850

The next major project was the rebuilding of the west front, or facade, in the Gothic style. The first stone was placed on 25 May 1277, by Bishop Conrad of Lichtenberg. The new plan was inspired in part by French cathedrals, particularly the Basilica of Saint-Urbain of Troyes. The design called for a west front taller and wider than the nave behind it. By the use of buttresses and a double wall, the outer wall decorative with wide spaces, and the inner wall bearing the weight and having large windows, the interior of the cathedral could have more light. At the same time, the planned two spires on either side of the facade would reach an extraordinary height of 122 meters. Erwin von Steinbach's son Johannes von Steinbach served as magister operis, or Werkmeister (chief architect) from (at least) 1332 until his death in 1341. From 1341 until 1372 (or according to other sources: 1339–1371), the post of chief architect was held by a Master Gerlach (not to be confused with Erwin's other son, Gerlach von Steinbach, architect of the Niederhaslach Church), who has been identified as Erwin's grandson Johannes Gerlach von Steinbach. He completed the installation of the rose window, and above it twelve statues of the apostles. In 1372 the work was taken over by a master Conrad, also known as Kuntze, about whom little is known, until 1382. He was followed by a Michael von Freiburg (also known as Michael von Gmünd, or Michael Parler, from the Parler family of architects), recorded as magister operis in 1383–1387, who was then succeeded by Claus von Lohre (1388−1399). The three men completed the bell tower over the central part of the façade, in a design that moved away from Gerlach von Steinbach's initial idea of a central tower and whose precise authorship is unknown.

The octagonal north tower was the combined work of architects Ulrich Ensingen (shaft) and Johannes Hültz of Cologne (top). Ensingen worked on the cathedral from 1399 to 1419, taking over from Claus von Lohre, and Hültz from 1419 to 1439, completing the building at last. The building of the second tower was often discussed, and was seriously proposed when Alsace became part of Germany after the Franco-Prussian War in 1871, but was coldly received by the population of Strasbourg, who considered it would be a symbol of German occupation.

The north tower was the world's tallest building from 1647 (when the taller spire of St. Mary's Church, Stralsund burnt down) until 1874 (when the tower of St. Nikolai's Church in Hamburg was completed). The planned south tower was never built and as a result, with its characteristic asymmetrical form, the cathedral is now the premier landmark of Alsace. One can see 30 kilometers from the observation level, which provides a view of the Rhine banks from the Vosges all the way to the Black Forest.

In 1505, architect Jakob von Landshut and sculptor Hans von Aachen finished rebuilding the Saint-Lawrence portal (Portail Saint-Laurent) outside the northern transept in a markedly post-Gothic, early-Renaissance style. As with the other portals of the cathedral, most of the statues now to be seen in situ are copies, the originals having been moved to the Musée de l'Œuvre Notre-Dame.

Strasbourg and Cologne Cathedral together represent some of the earliest surviving uses of architectural drawing. The work of Professor Robert O. Bork of the University of Iowa suggests that the design of the Strasbourg façade, while seeming almost random in its complexity, can be constructed using a series of rotated octagons.

=== Later history ===
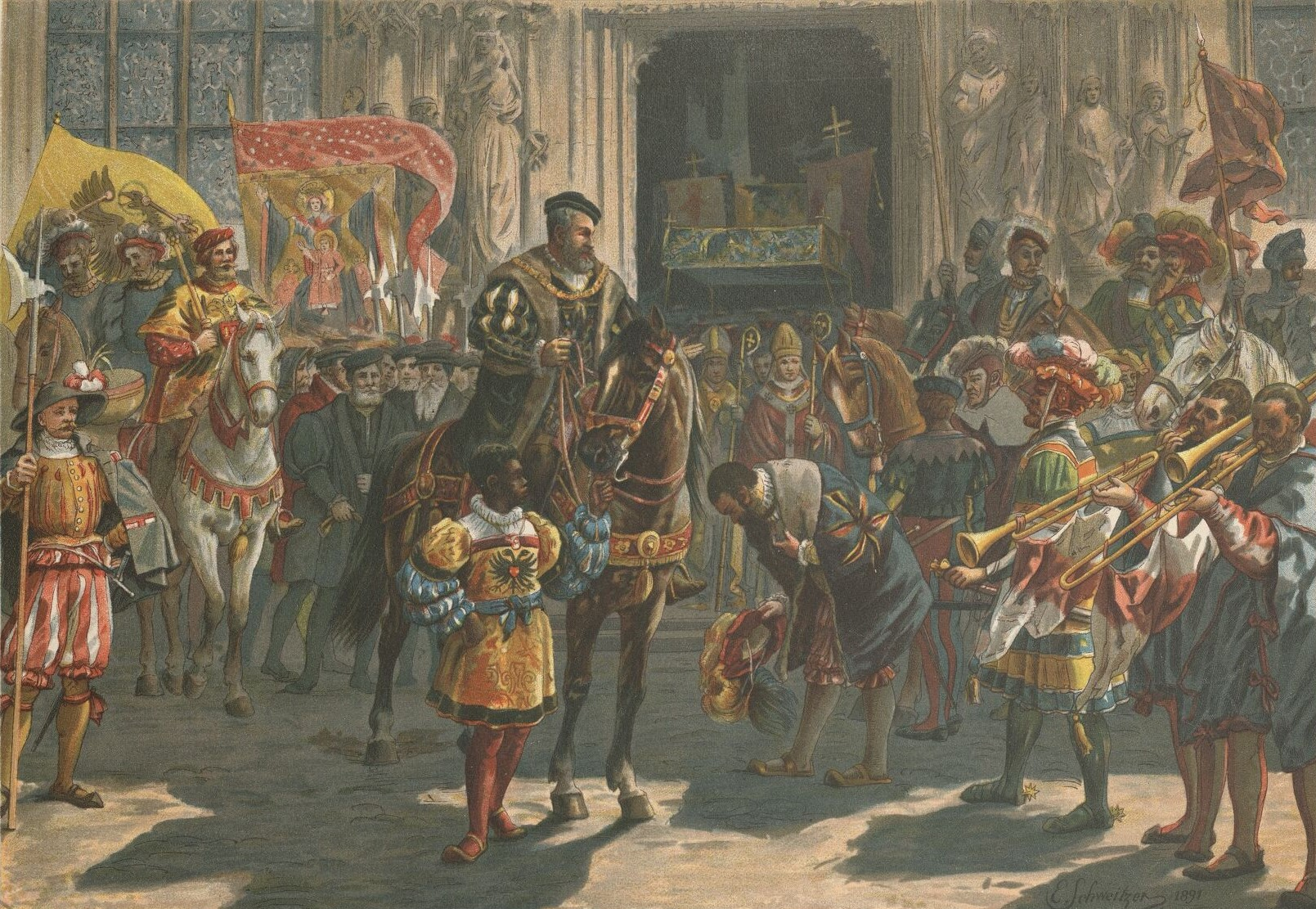
Emperior Charles V visits the cathedral in 1552. Behind him is the portal of Saint Laurent.

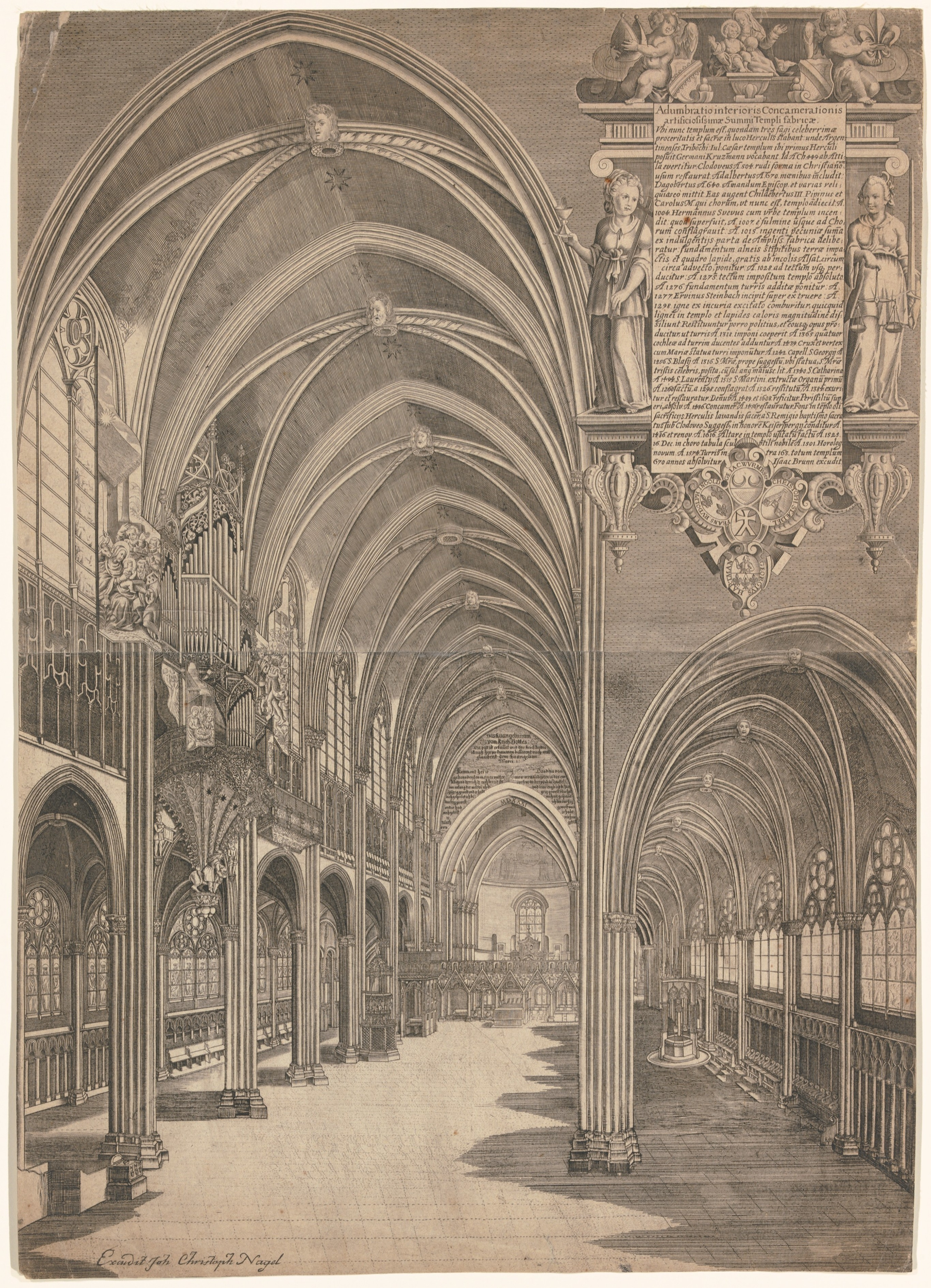
Interior of the cathedral, c. 1617

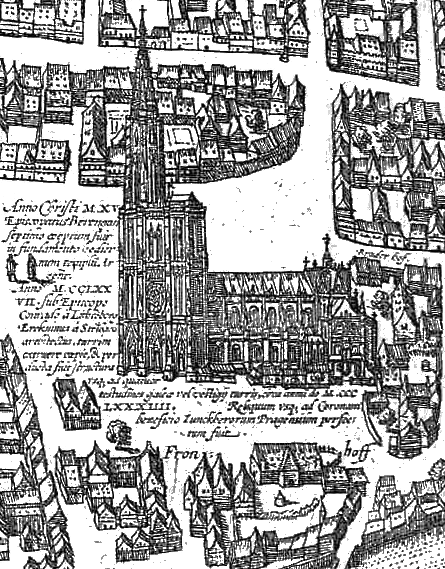
Exterior of cathedral in 1617

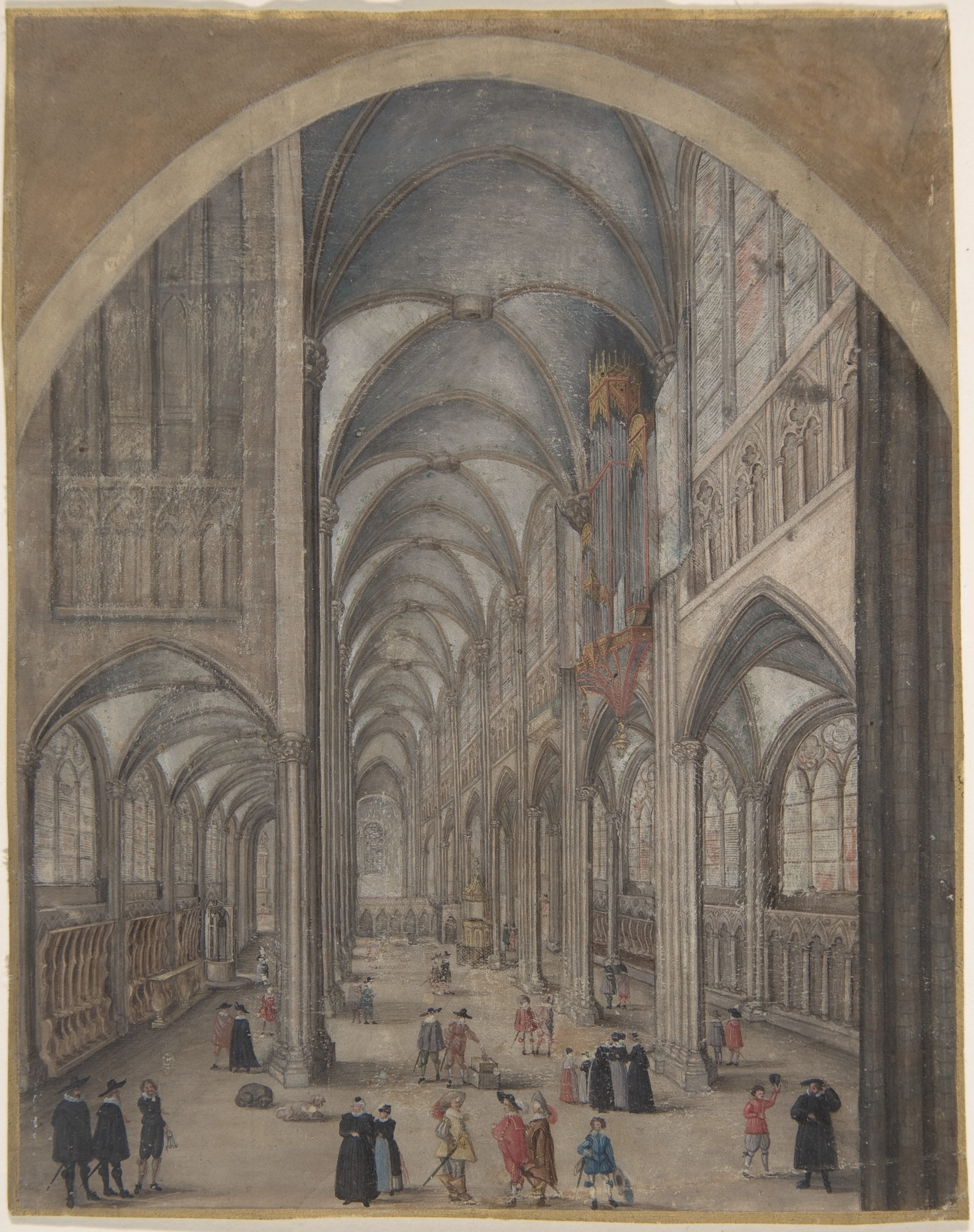
Interior of the cathedral (1625–30)

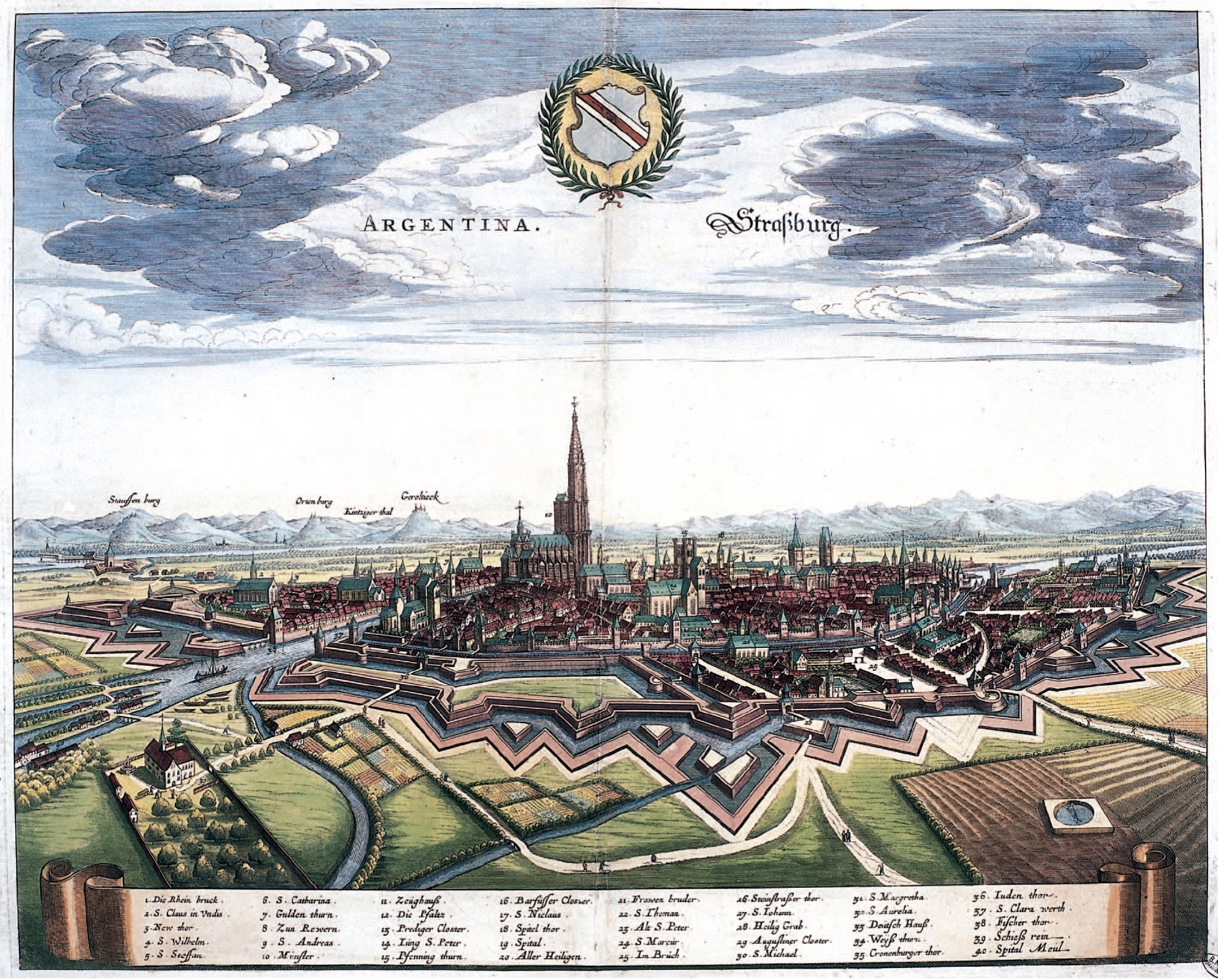
The cathedral in 1644

In the late Middle Ages, the city of Strasbourg had managed to liberate itself from the domination of the bishop and to rise to the status of Free Imperial City. The outgoing 15th century was marked by the sermons of Johann Geiler von Kaisersberg and by the emerging Protestant Reformation, represented in Strasbourg by figures such as John Calvin, Martin Bucer and Jacob Sturm von Sturmeck. In 1524, the city council assigned the cathedral to the Protestant faith, while the building suffered some damage from iconoclastic assaults.

After the annexation of the city by Louis XIV of France, on 30 September 1681, and a mass celebrated in the cathedral on 23 October 1681 in presence of the King and prince-bishop Franz Egon of Fürstenberg, the cathedral was returned to the Catholics and its inside redesigned according to the Catholic liturgy of the Counter-Reformation. In 1682, the choir screen (built in 1252) was broken out to expand the choir towards the nave. Remains of the choir screen are displayed in the Musée de l'Œuvre Notre-Dame and in The Cloisters. The main or high altar, a major work of early Renaissance sculpture, was also demolished that year. Fragments can be seen in the Musée de l'Œuvre Notre-Dame.

A round, Baroque sacristy of modest proportions was added north-east of the northern transept in 1744 by the city's chief architect Joseph Massol according to plans by Robert de Cotte and between 1772 and 1778 architect Jean-Laurent Goetz surrounded the cathedral by a gallery in early Gothic Revival style in order to reorganise the merchants' shops that used to settle around the building (and would do so until 1843).

=== The French Revolution and 19th century ===
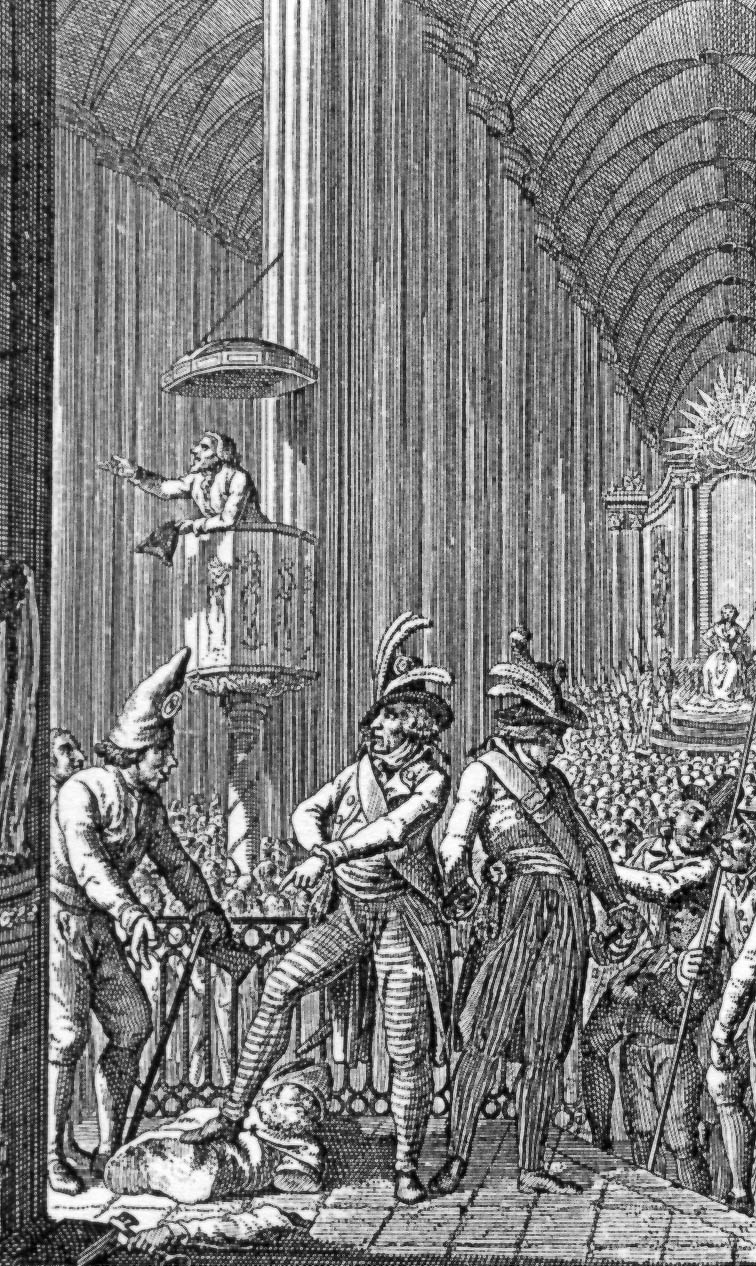
Notre Dame of Strasbourg turned into a Temple of Reason during the French Revolution

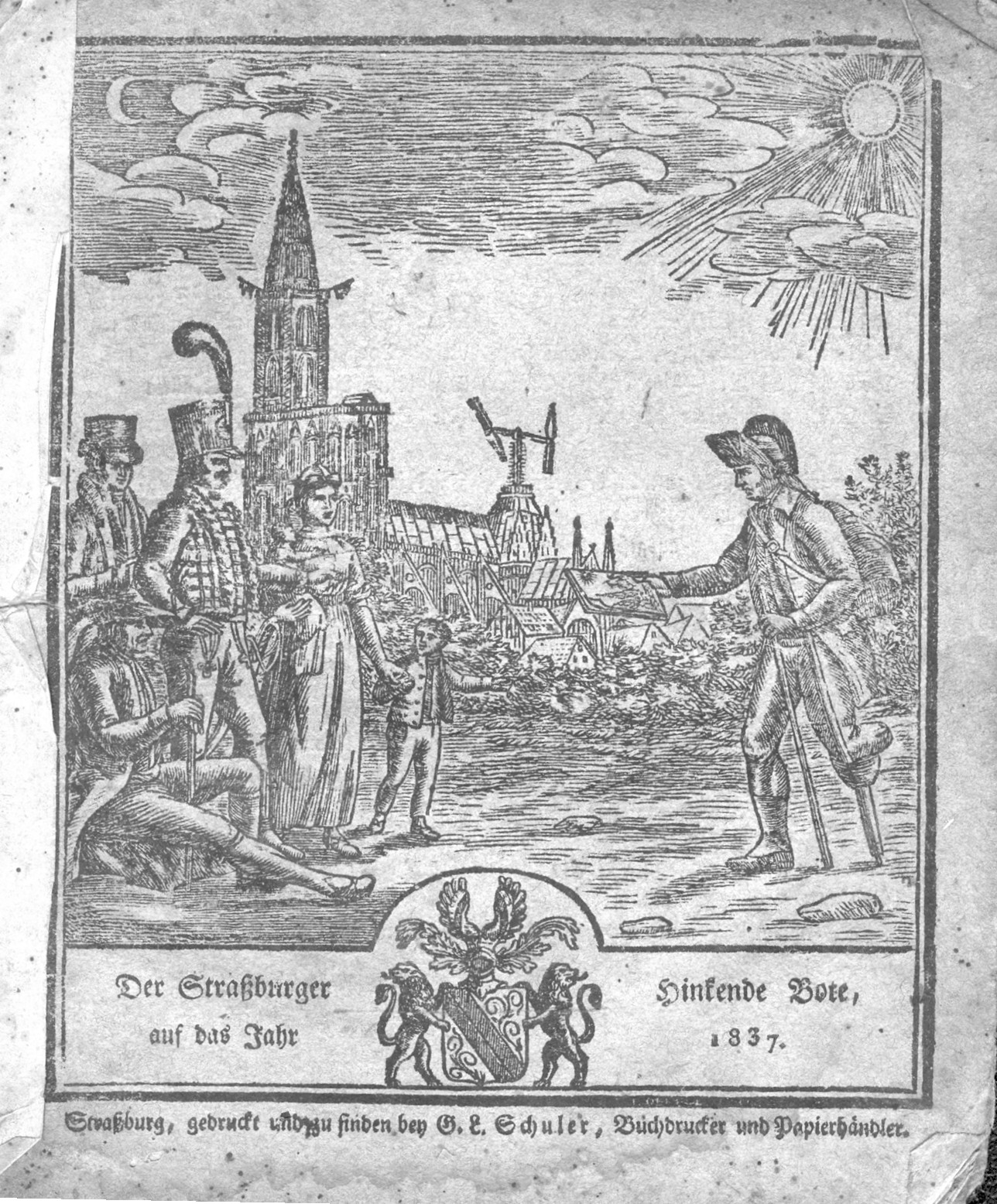
Strasbourg cathedral in 1837 with an optical telegraph

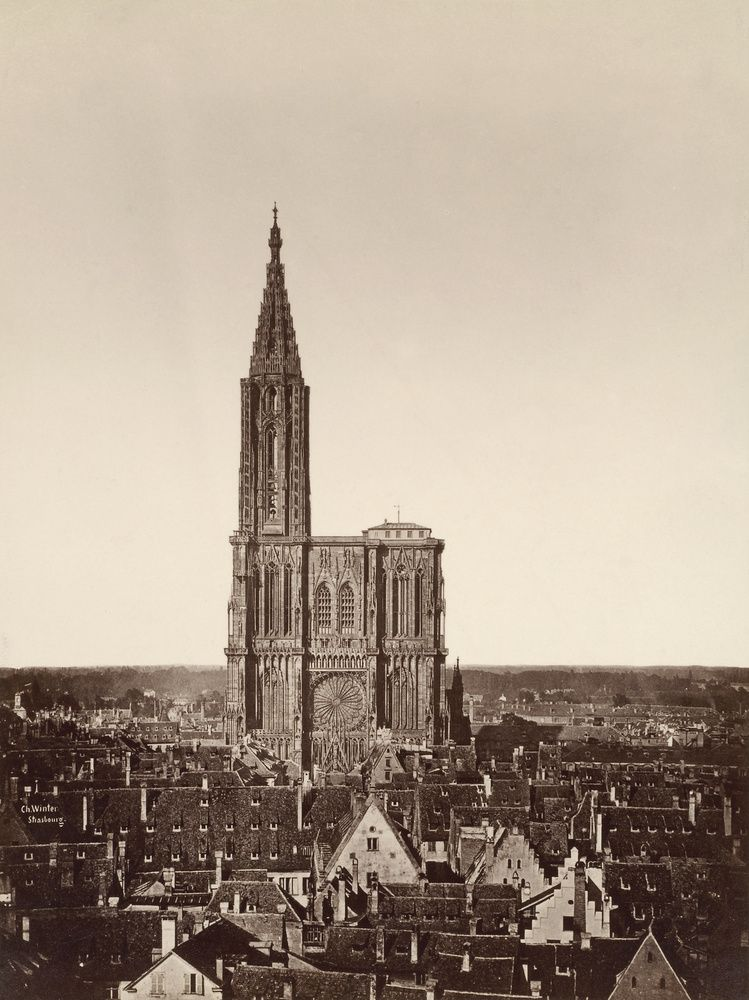
Strasbourg and the cathedral in 1869 (photo by Charles David Winter)

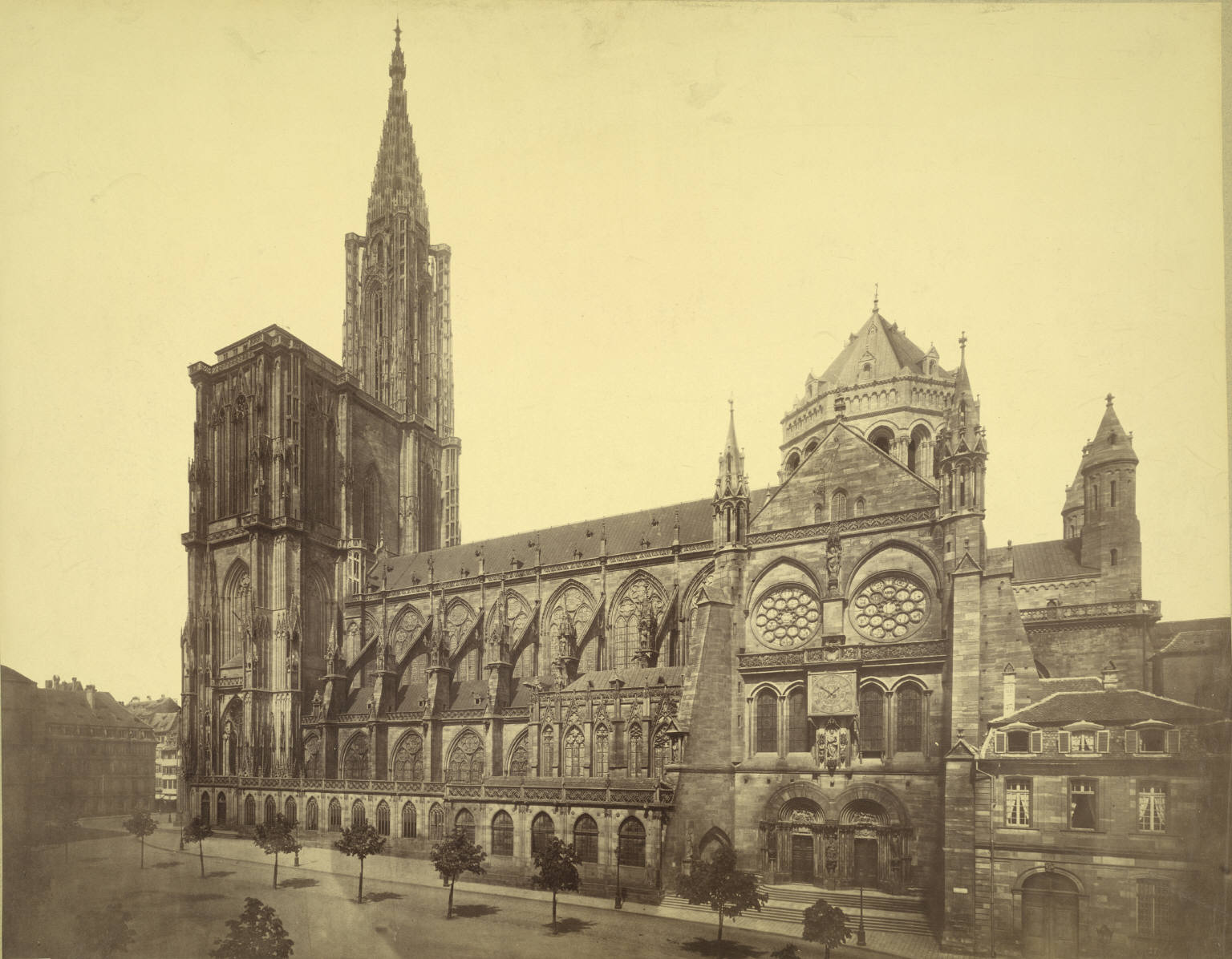
The cathedral in 1885

Following the outbreak of the French Revolution, on 2 November 1789, all church property was seized by the French state and was soon vandalised by the most ardent revolutionaries, the Enragés. The director of public works of Strasbourg, Gérold, quickly took down and protected the statues of the portal, but 215 statues of the voussures over the portals were smashed with hammers, as were the angels atop the gables on the facade, and the crowns and sceptres of the statues of the kings. The sculpture over the central tympanum and over the south portal of the transept was saved because it was covered with wooden planks with the revolutionary motto "Liberté-Égalité-Fraternité".

In April 1794, the Enragés started planning to tear the spire down, on the grounds that it hurt the principle of equality. The tower was saved, however, when in May of the same year citizens of Strasbourg crowned it with a giant tin Phrygian cap of the kind the Enragés themselves wore. This artifact was later kept in the historical collections of the city until they were all destroyed during the Siege of Strasbourg in a massive fire in August 1870.

Seven church bells were removed and melted down to made into cannon, and gold and other precious objects in the interior confiscated and taken away, and in November 1793 the cathedral was formally proclaimed a "Temple of Reason".

The cathedral was not returned to church control until 15 July 1801, along with confiscated property that had not been destroyed. The sculpture of the portals was returned to its place or restored between 1811 and 1827. However, the official ownership of the structure was given, and belongs today, to the French state, and it is administered by the Mayor of Strasbourg.

A series of major reconstructions and restorations were carried out in the second of the century Gustave Klotz from 1837 to 1888. This included rebuilding the crypt and the addition of new stained-glass windows. The choir was given its multicolour painted decoration, by Édouard Steinlé and Charles Auguste Steinheil, finished in 1879. Construction of the Neo-Romanessque dome over the transept was begun, and new bronze doors were installed in 1879. During the Franco-Prussian War of 1870–71, the city was under siege. The roof was set afire and the cross at the top of the spire was bent by a German artillery shell. After the French defeat, Alsace was ceded to the new German Empire until 1918. Following the war, Klotz took German nationality so he could continue his work. He reconstructed the dome over the transept in a grander, Romanesque Revival style.

=== 20th–21st century ===
In 1903, the architect Johann Knauth discovered cracks on the first pillar of the northern side of the nave. In 1905 he began taking measures to consolidate and strengthen the north side of the west facade, which supports the spire. After trying several temporary measures, in 1915, during the First World War, he launched a large-scale project to replace the entire foundation of the cathedral with concrete. This project was completed in 1926, after the end of the war. In 1918 Alsace and Strasbourg were once again attached to France.

During World War II, the cathedral was seen as a symbol for both warring parties. Adolf Hitler, who visited it on 28 June 1940, intended to transform the church into a "national sanctuary of the German people", or into a monument to the Unknown German Soldier. On 1 March 1941, General Leclerc made the "Oath of Kufra" (serment de Koufra), stating he would "rest the weapons only when our beautiful colours fly again on Strasbourg's cathedral". During the war, the stained glass was removed in 74 [storage] cases. and stored in a salt mine near Heilbronn, Germany. After the war, it was returned to the cathedral by the Monuments, Fine Arts and Archives section of the United States military.

The cathedral was hit by British and American bombs during air raids on the centre of Strasbourg on 11 August 1944, which also heavily damaged the Palais Rohan and the Sainte-Madeleine Church. In 1956, the Council of Europe donated the famous choir window by Max Ingrand, the "Strasbourg Madonna" (see also Flag of Europe § Marian interpretation). Repairs to war damage were completed only in the early 1990s.

In October 1988, when the city celebrated its 2,000th anniversary (as the first official mention of Argentoratum dates from 12 BC), pope John Paul II visited and celebrated mass in the cathedral. The bishopric of Strasbourg had been elevated to the rank of archbishopric a few months before, in June 1988.

In 2000, an Al-Qaeda plot to bomb the adjacent Christmas market was prevented by French and German police.

The restoration of the tower was completed in 2006, and in 2014 a new campaign of restoration begun on the south transept.

== Exterior ==
=== The west front ===
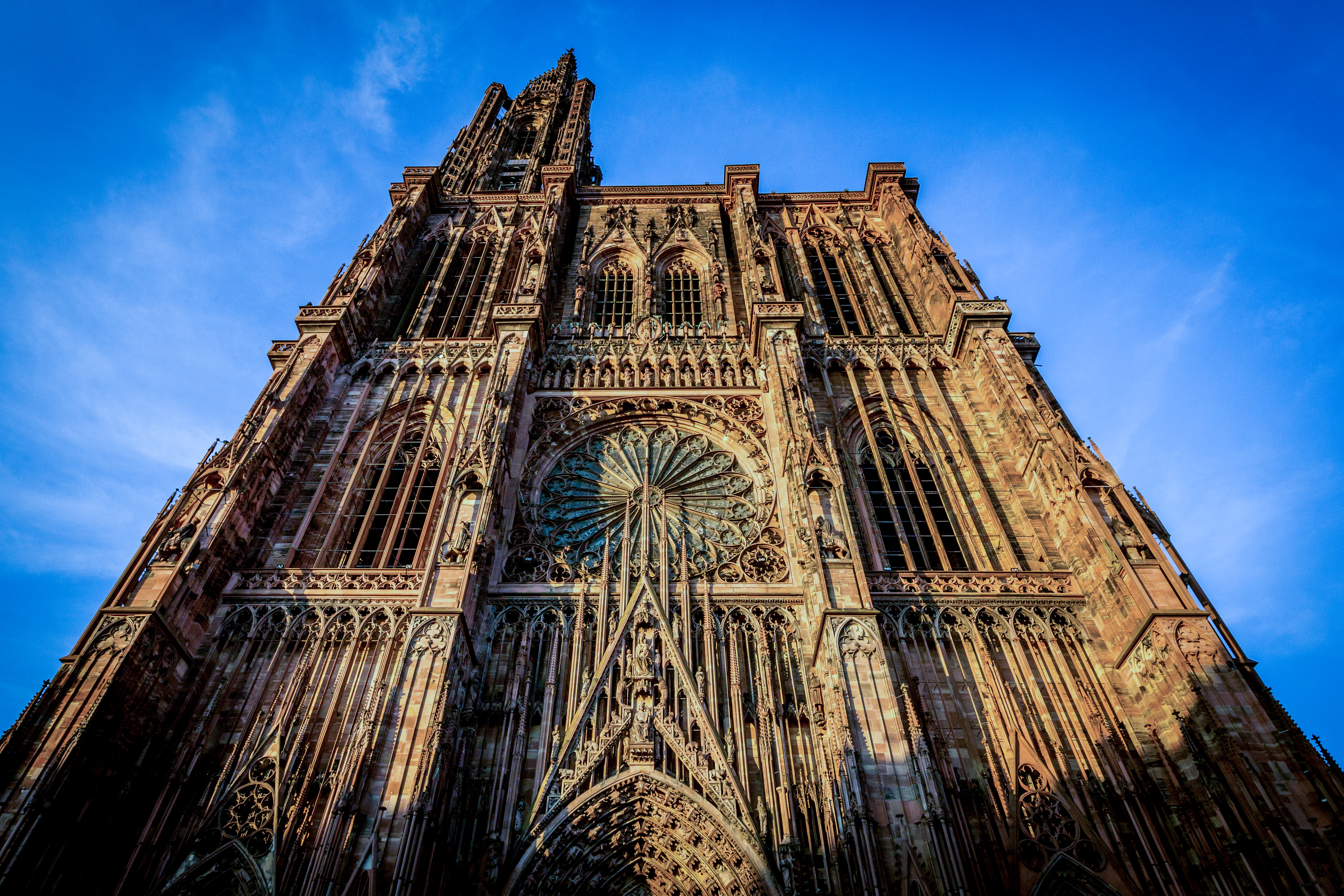
The west front

The west front or façade, the main entrance of the cathedral, is a relatively late addition, constructed between 1275 and 1399. The façade is supported and divided vertically by four narrow buttresses, each decorated with sculpture. It rises in three levels; the portals on the ground level; the level of the rose window above them, and the top level, with a balustrade. The rose window, with a rayonnant Gothic design, is fourteen metres in diameter and was finished in 1345. The pointed gable over the central portal, decorated with a sculpture of the Virgin Mary and child, reaches up into the space in front of the rose window. A gallery of statues of the Apostles, each in his own arch, is placed above the rose window.

The west front takes its distinctive appearance and sense of verticality from the dense network of lacelike pointed gables, pinnacles and tall, slender columns that cover it. The columns are purely decorative, and are so thin they are compared to the strings of a harp. The visual effect of the façade is enhanced by its unusual darkish red stone.

=== West portals ===
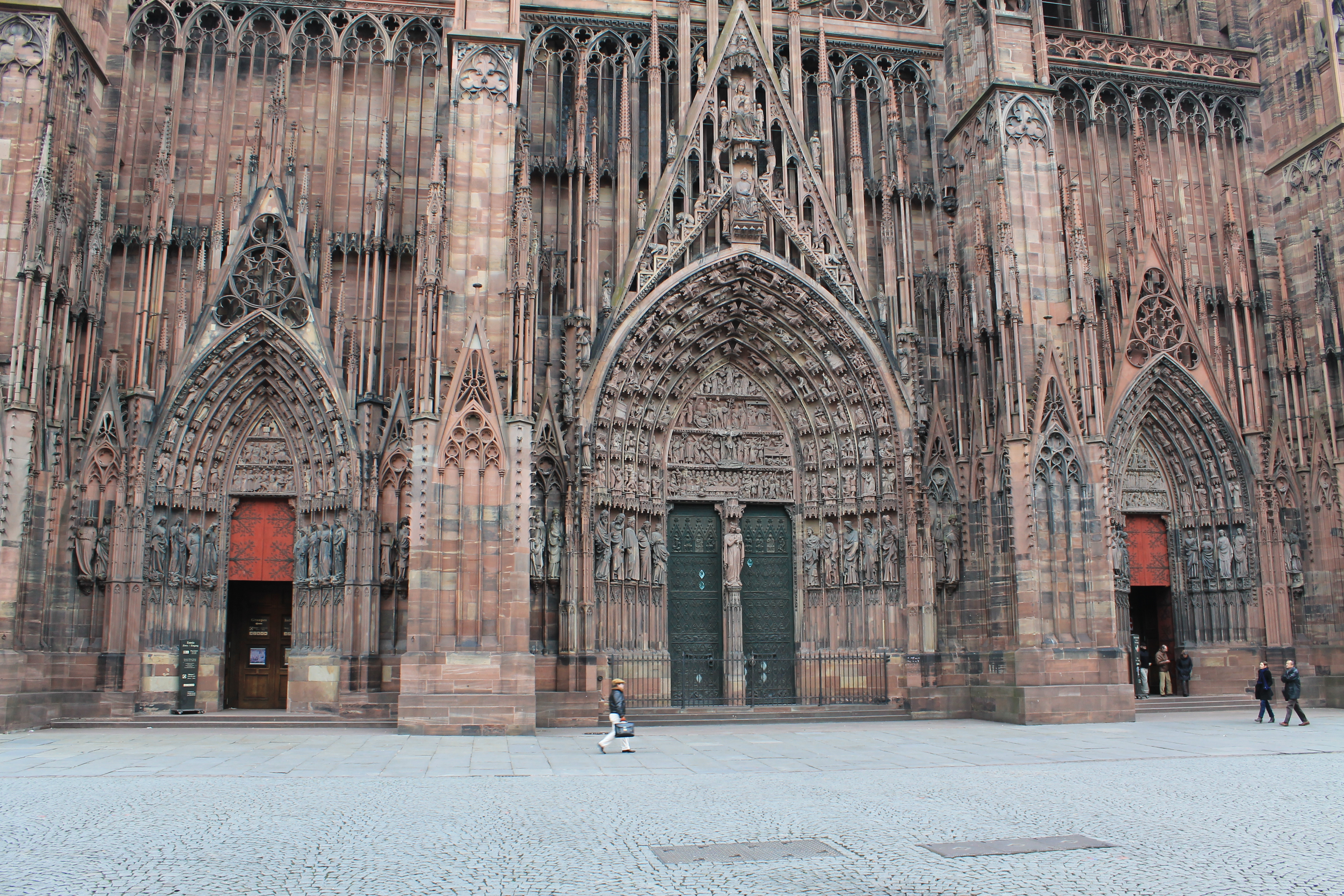
The west portals

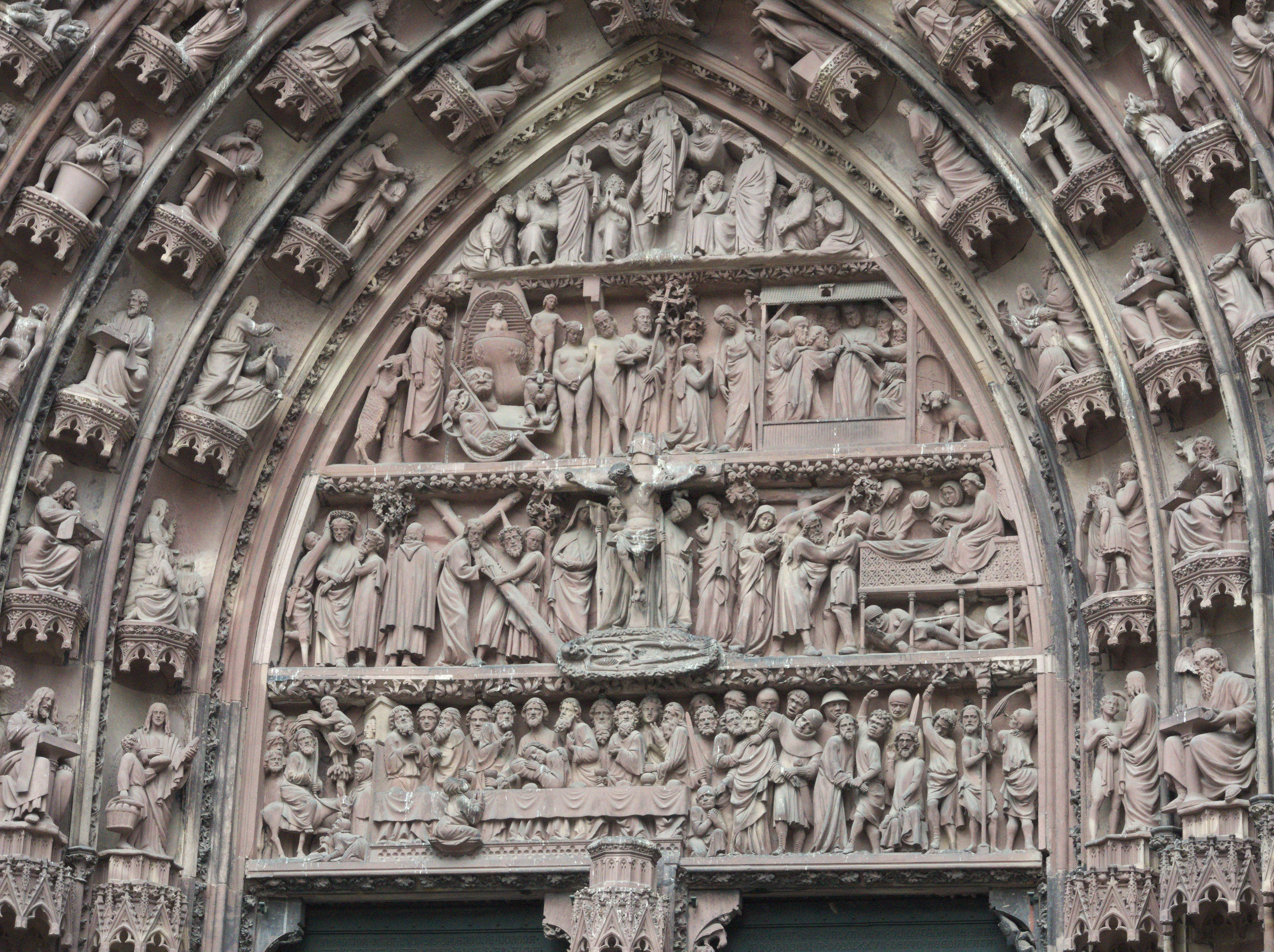
Tympanum of the central portal

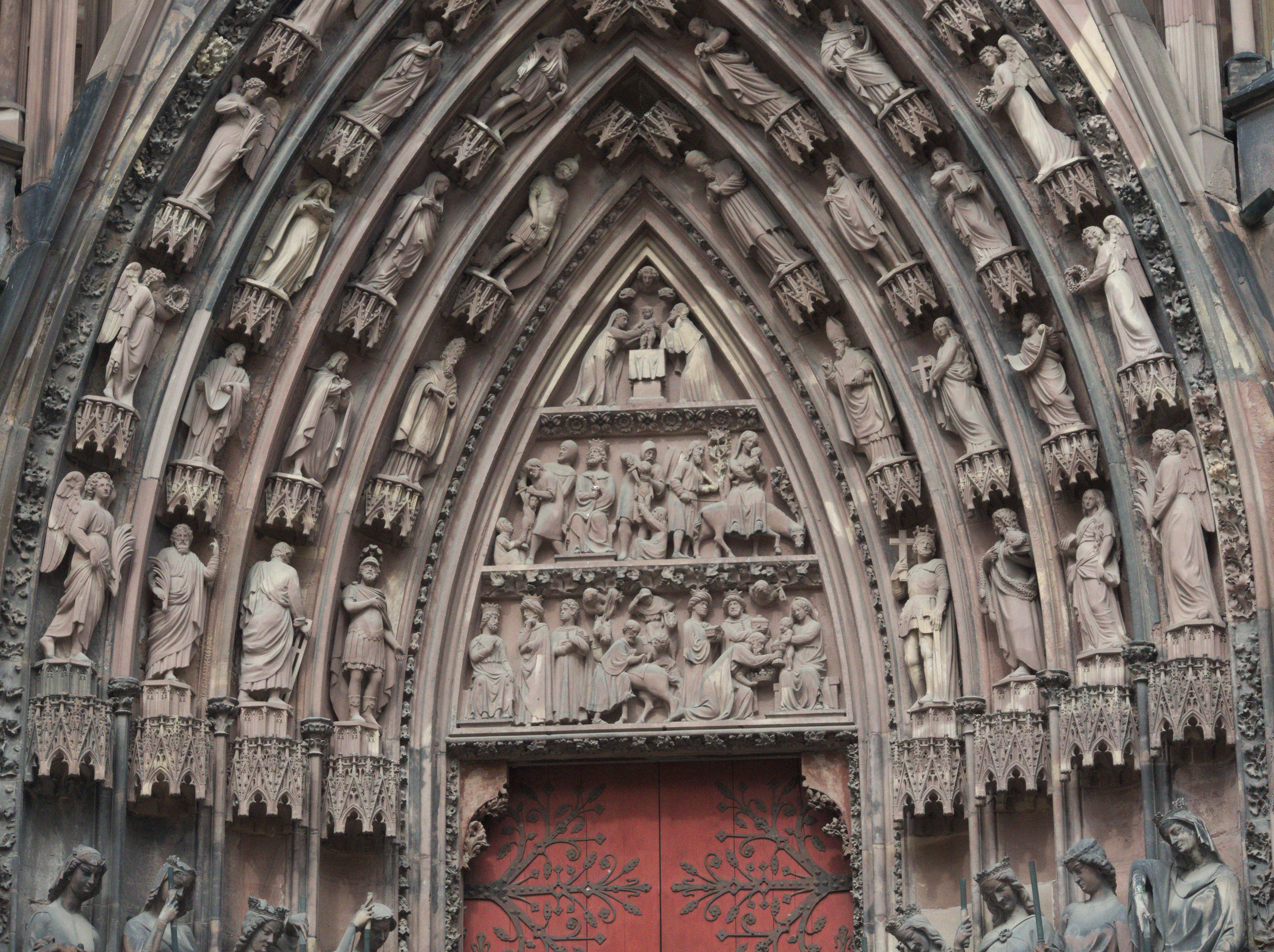
Tympanum of the left portal

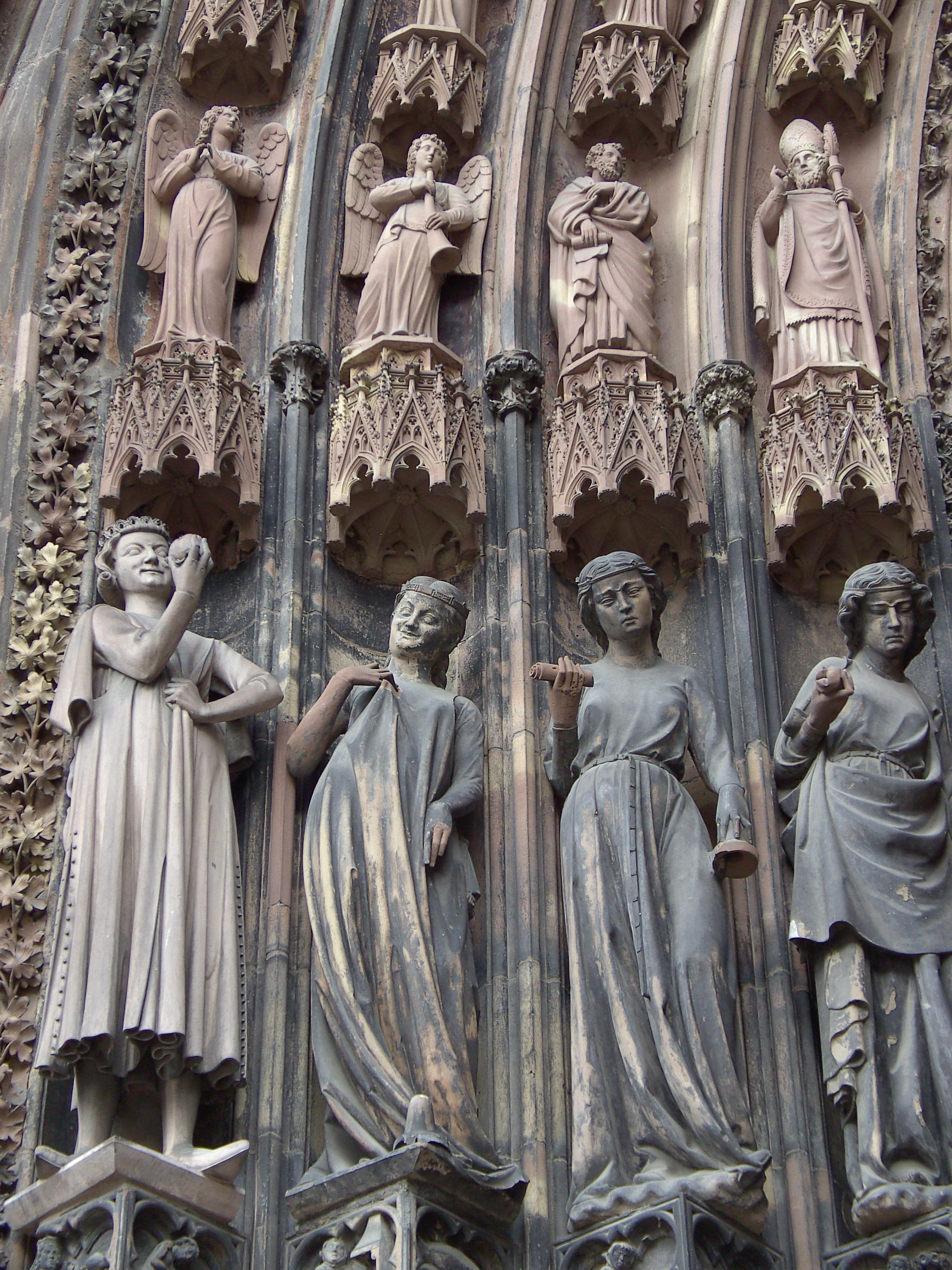
The foolish Virgins (left portal)

The cathedral has three portals, corresponding to the three vessels of the nave. Each has a particular theme of decoration; the left portal is dedicated to the infancy of Christ, the central portal to redemption, and the right portal to the Last Judgement. The portals are set forward from the front of the church by the network of slender columns, spires and arches which form an outer decorative wall. The sculpture largely dates to the late 13th century and is similar in theme and style to that of the sculpture of Reims Cathedral made between 1250 and 1260, though the Strasbourg sculpture shows greater realism.

The arched tympanum over the doors of the central portal is crowded with sculpture, as are the voussures, the stone arches around the door. The central figures depict the entry of Christ into Jerusalem, and the Crucifixion and Passion of Christ, all with exceptional expression and detail.

The portal of the infancy of Christ (left) depicts angels, bishops and saints in the voussures, and figures representing the virtues, carrying spears, prod the figures representing the vices. In the portal of the Last Judgement, (right) Christ sits on his throne sorting the virtuous from the wicked. The wicked attempt, without success, to seduce the noble Virgins, but succeed with the foolish virgins.

Unlike the sculpture of earlier cathedrals, the Strasbourg statues clearly show emotions; the prophets look severe, the Virgins appear serene, the Virtues look noble, and the frivolous Virgins appear foolish. The statues in the portals are all standing upon realistically carved capitals decorated with the signs of the zodiac.

=== Portal of Saint Lawrence (North transept) ===
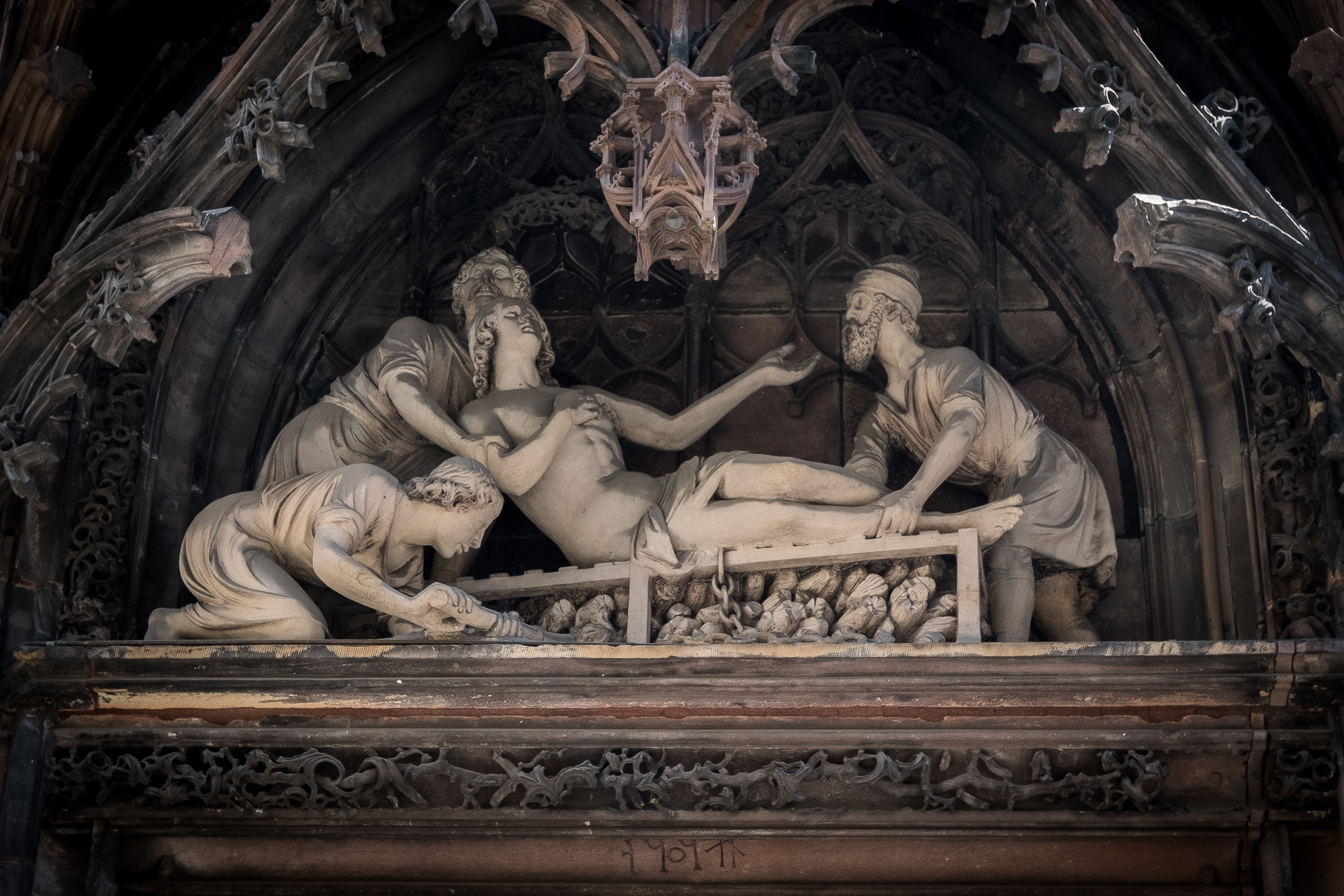
Martyrdom of Saint Laurent

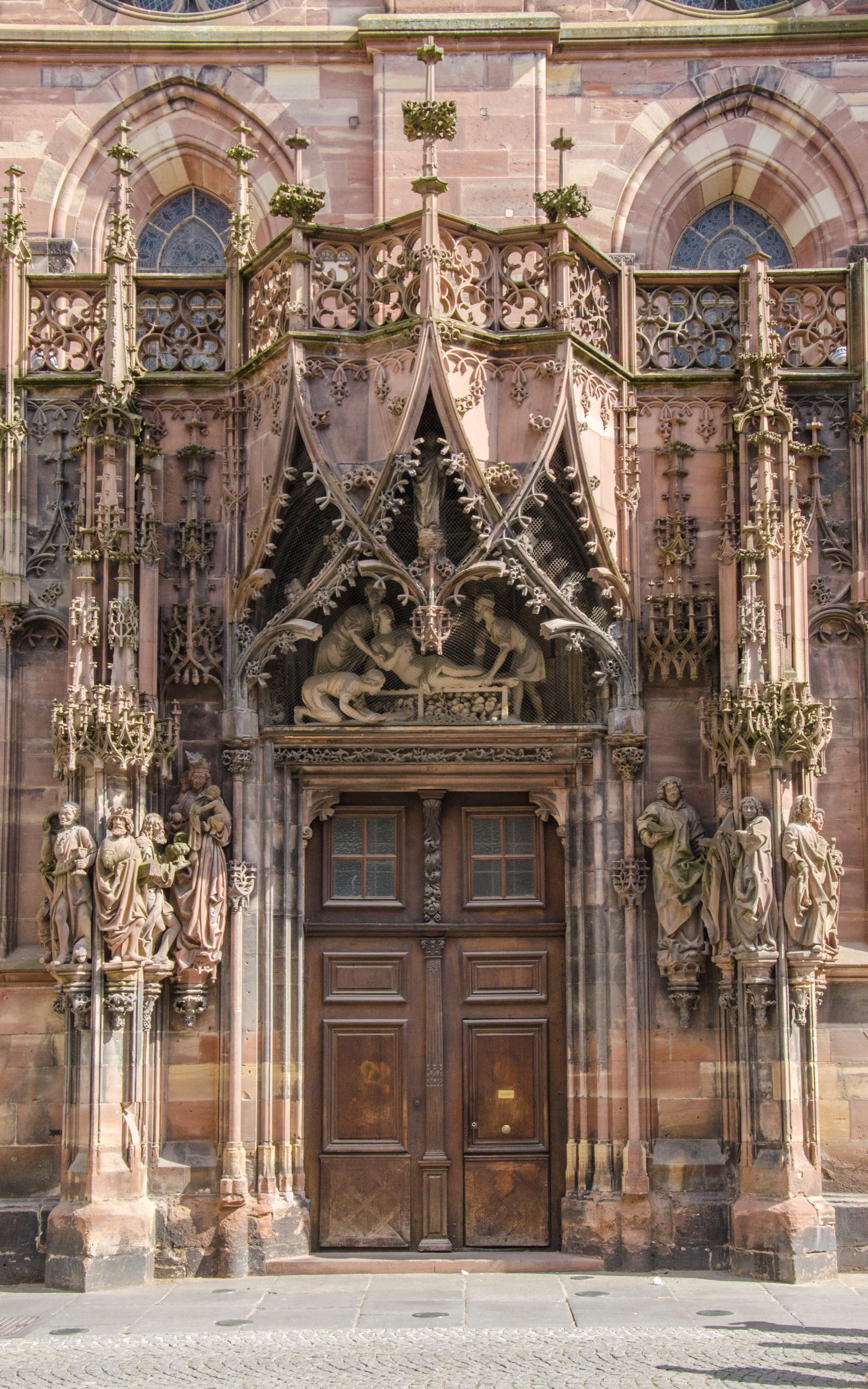
The portal of Saint-Laurent, on the north transept

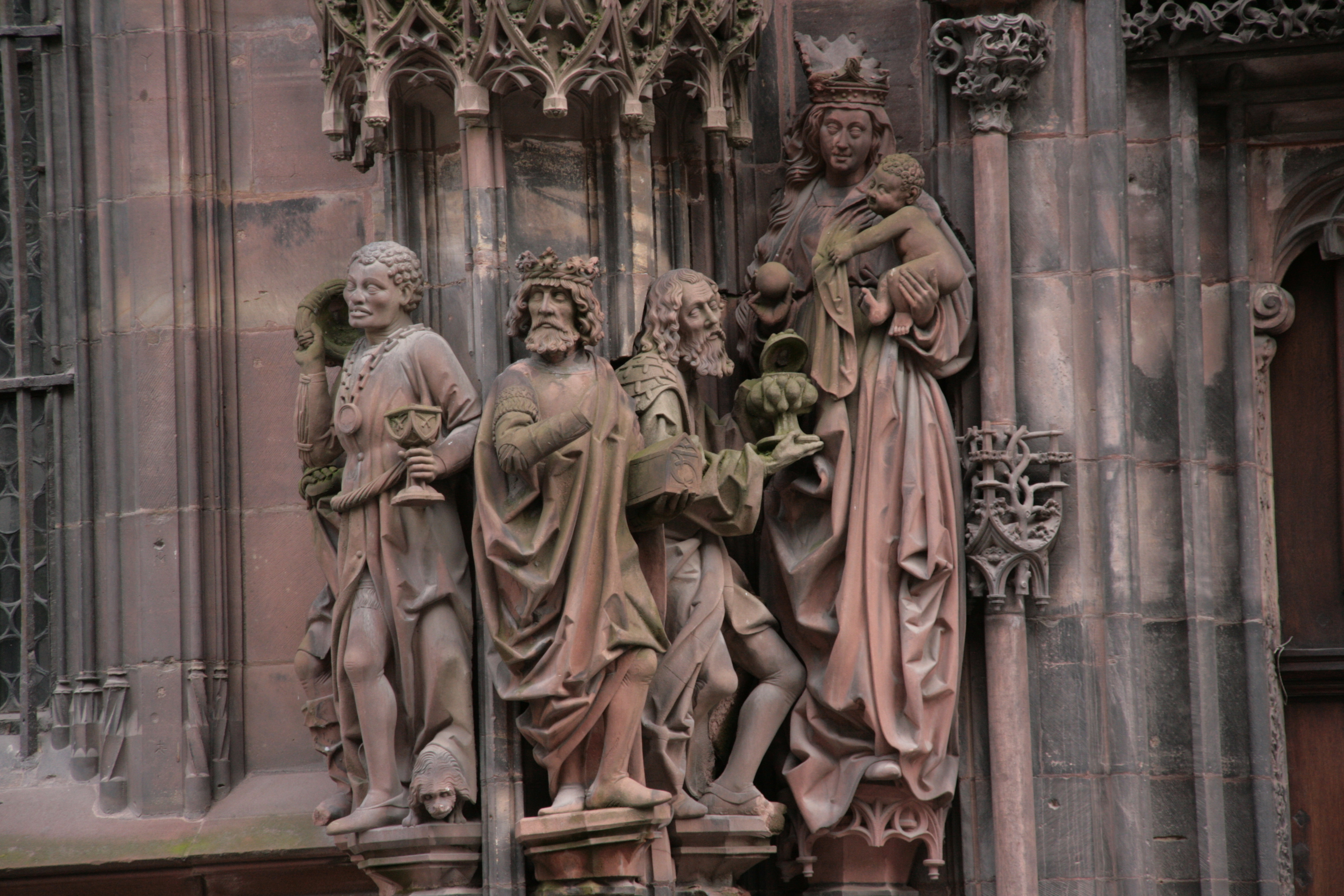
The three Kings with the Virgin Mary and child

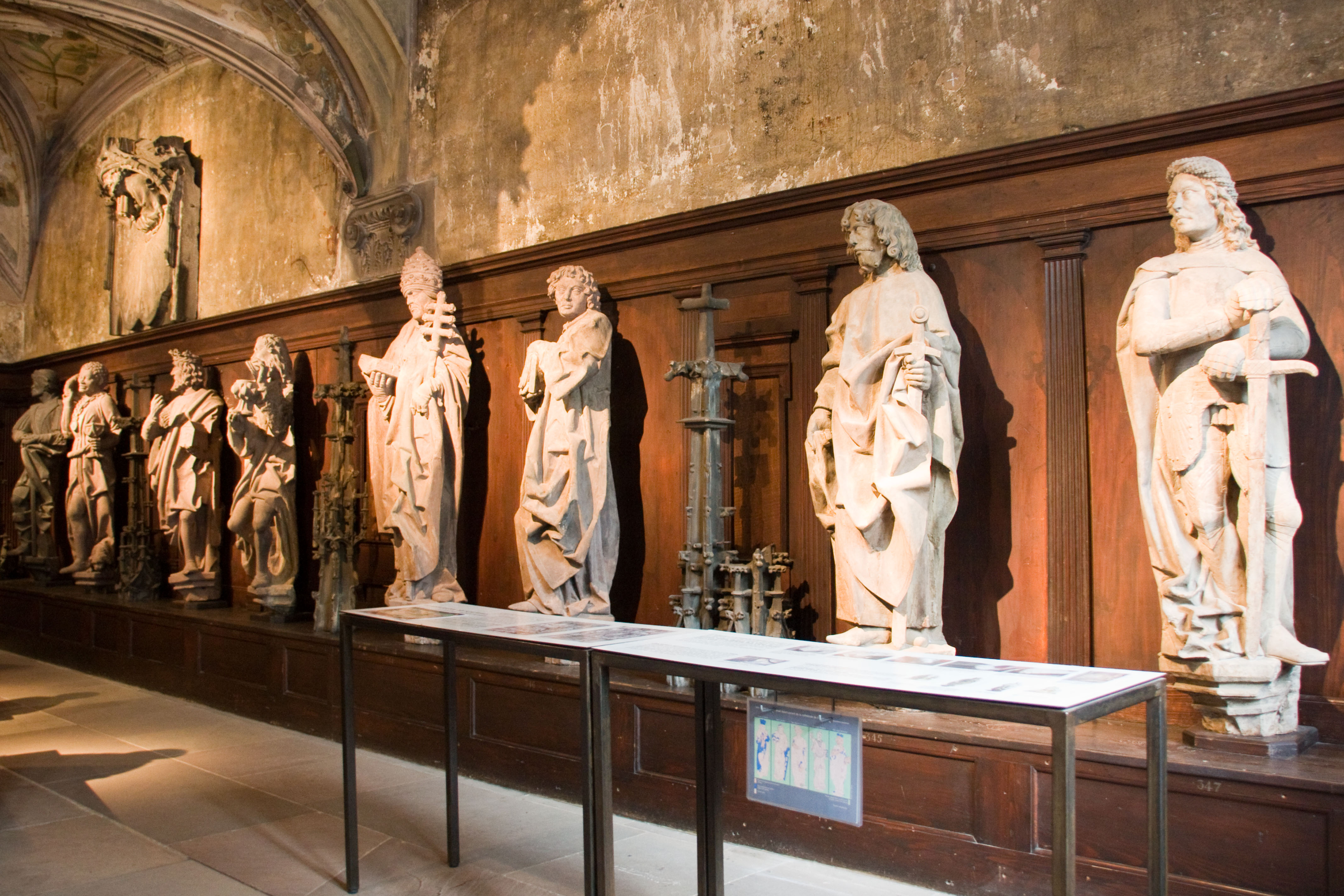
Original statues in the Musée de l'Œuvre Notre-Dame

The portal of Saint Lawrence, was added to the north transept between 1495 and 1505 by Jacob von (or Jacques de) Landshut, with sculptures by Hans von Aachen (aka Johan von Ach, or Jean d'Aix-la-Chapelle) and Conrad Sifer. The original statues were replaced by copies in the 20th century and are today kept in the Musée de l'Œuvre Notre-Dame. The tympanum was destroyed in the French Revolution and replaced by a work by the sculptor Jean Vallastre (1765–1833). It presents a virtual theater of late Gothic flamboyant architecture and decoration, including three interlocking arches over the doors, containing a statue of the Saint during his martyrdom. The supporting buttresses on either side also have very expressive sculpture representing the Virgin Mary and the three Magi on one side, and a group of Saints on the other, both sheltered beneath lacelike flamboyant sculpture and pinnacles. A balustrade crosses the face of the transept, and above is a wall of two bays filled with stained glass.

=== Portal of the Virgin (South transept) ===
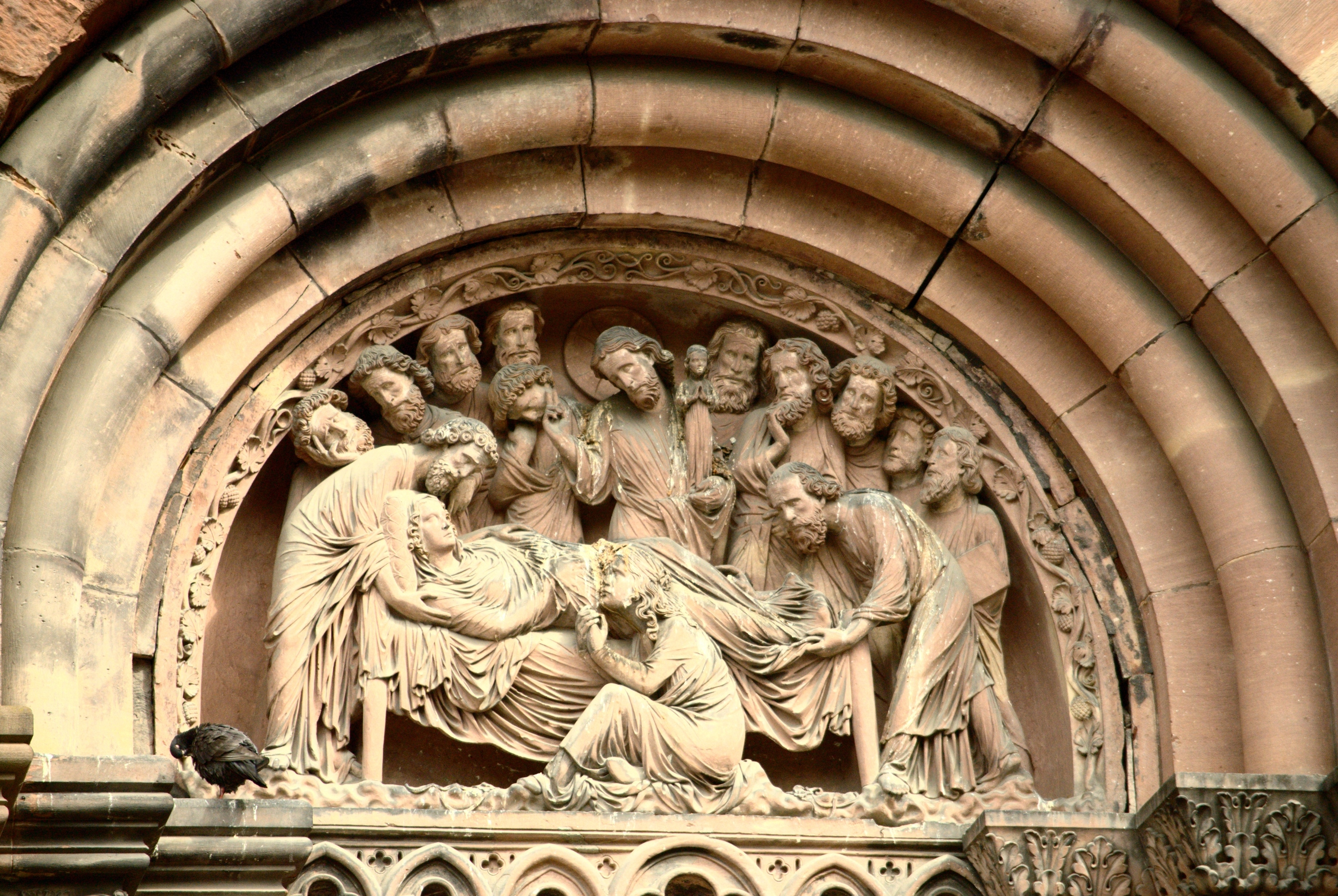
The death of the Virgin Mary

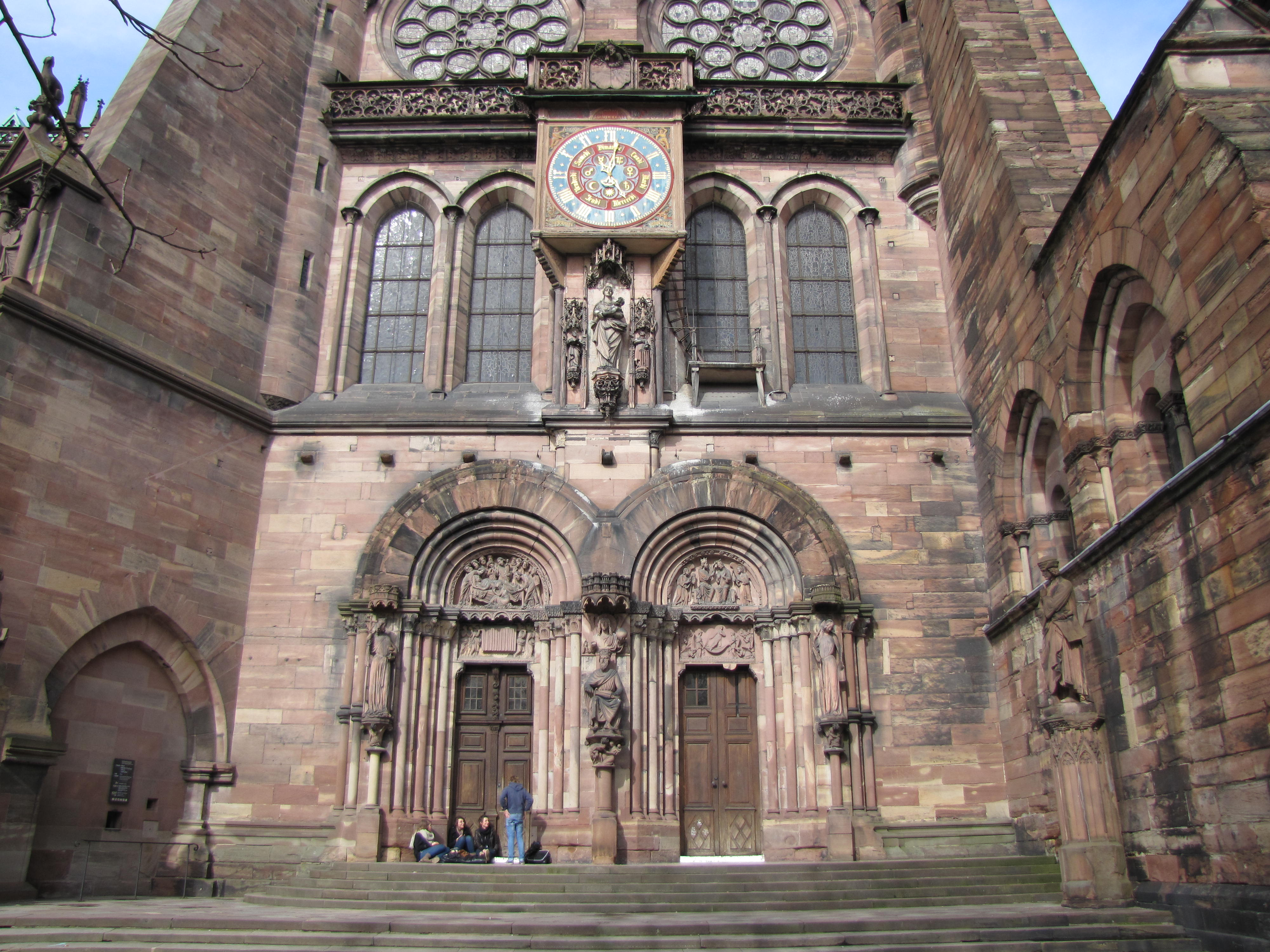
Portal of The Virgin (south transept)

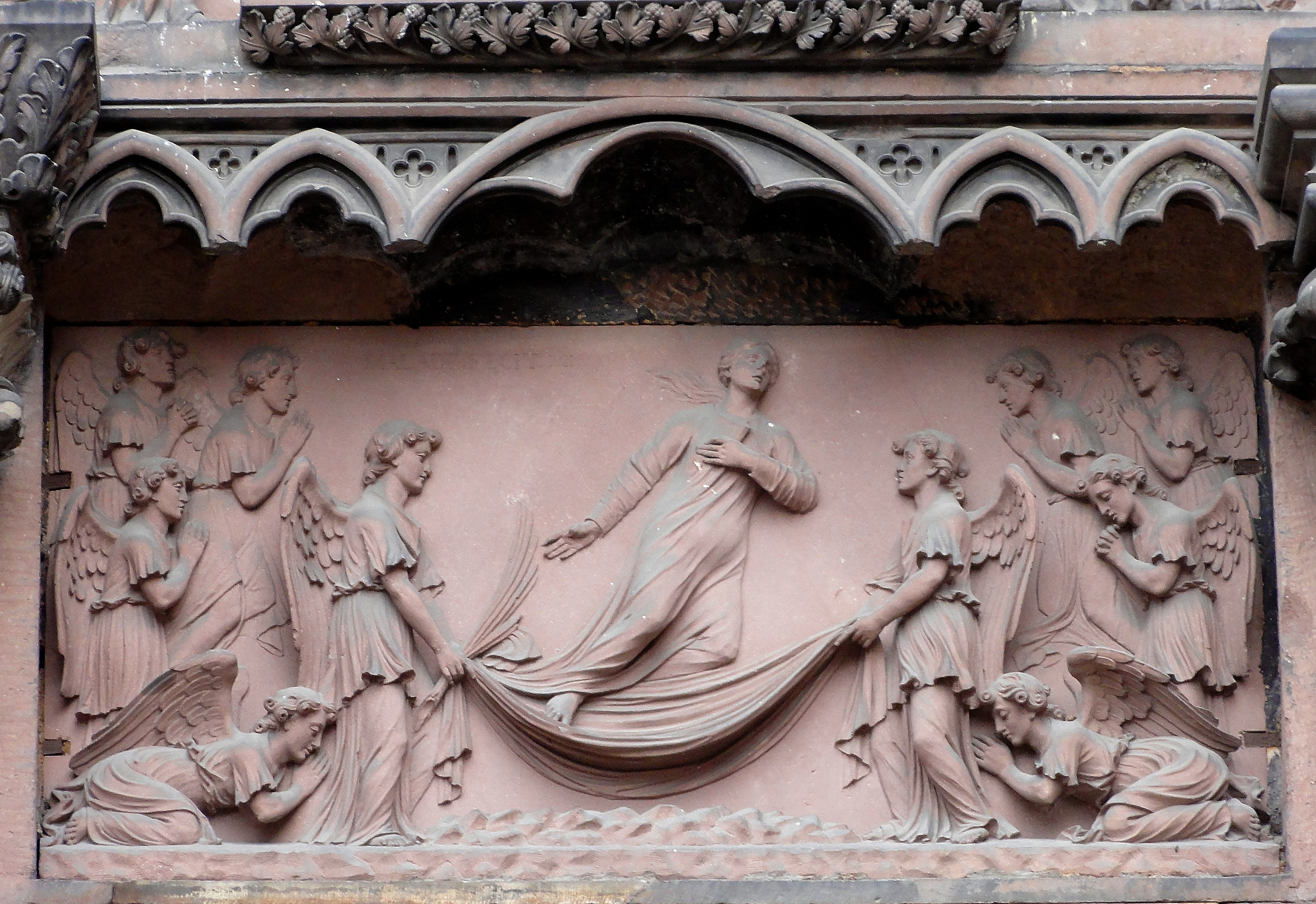
Lintel decoration – Mary ascends to Heaven

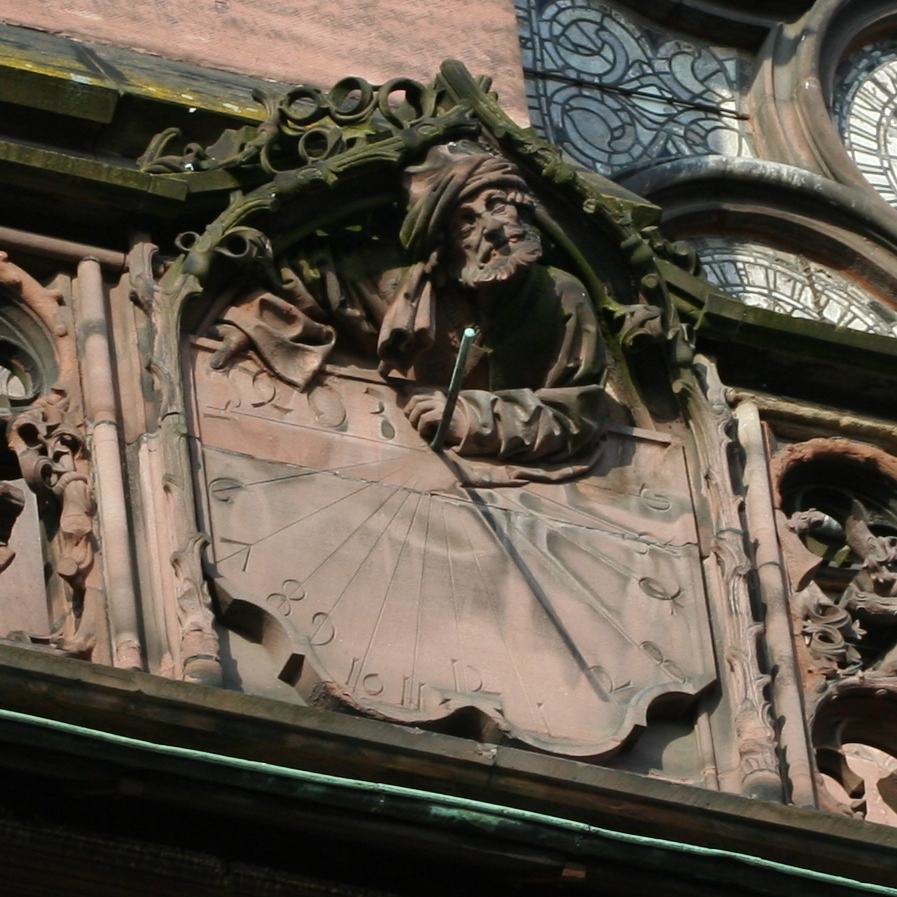
Sundial (1493)

The south portal, or Portal of the Virgin, dates to about the 1220s, the same time as the Pillar of the Angels and the Astronomic clock in the interior. Decrees of the Emperor rendering justice were traditionally read out in front of this doorway. The rounded arches of tympanum over the doorway contain sculpture of the Virgin Mary dying, surrounded by the Twelve Apostles and being crowned by Christ. The original statue-columns of the Apostles from the 1220s which supported the tympanum were smashed in 1793 during the French Revolution.

The mid-level of the transept over the portal, built in about 1230, has lancet windows and a statue of Virgin, flanked by Saint Peter and Saint Lawrence. Above this is a colourful clock with the signs of the zodiac. Above this is a flamboyant Gothic balustrade with an original sundial from about 1493, and above that are two small rose windows from the same period. Following their destruction during the French Revolution, several of the sculptures have been replaced in the 19th century by works by Philippe Grass, Jean-Étienne Malade, and Jean Vallastre.

As with all the other portals, several of the statues have been replaced by copies in situ and are today displayed in the Musée de l'Œuvre Notre-Dame. This is also true for Ecclesia and Synagoga, arguably the most famous statues of the cathedral, if not of Strasbourg.

=== Octagon bell tower and spire ===
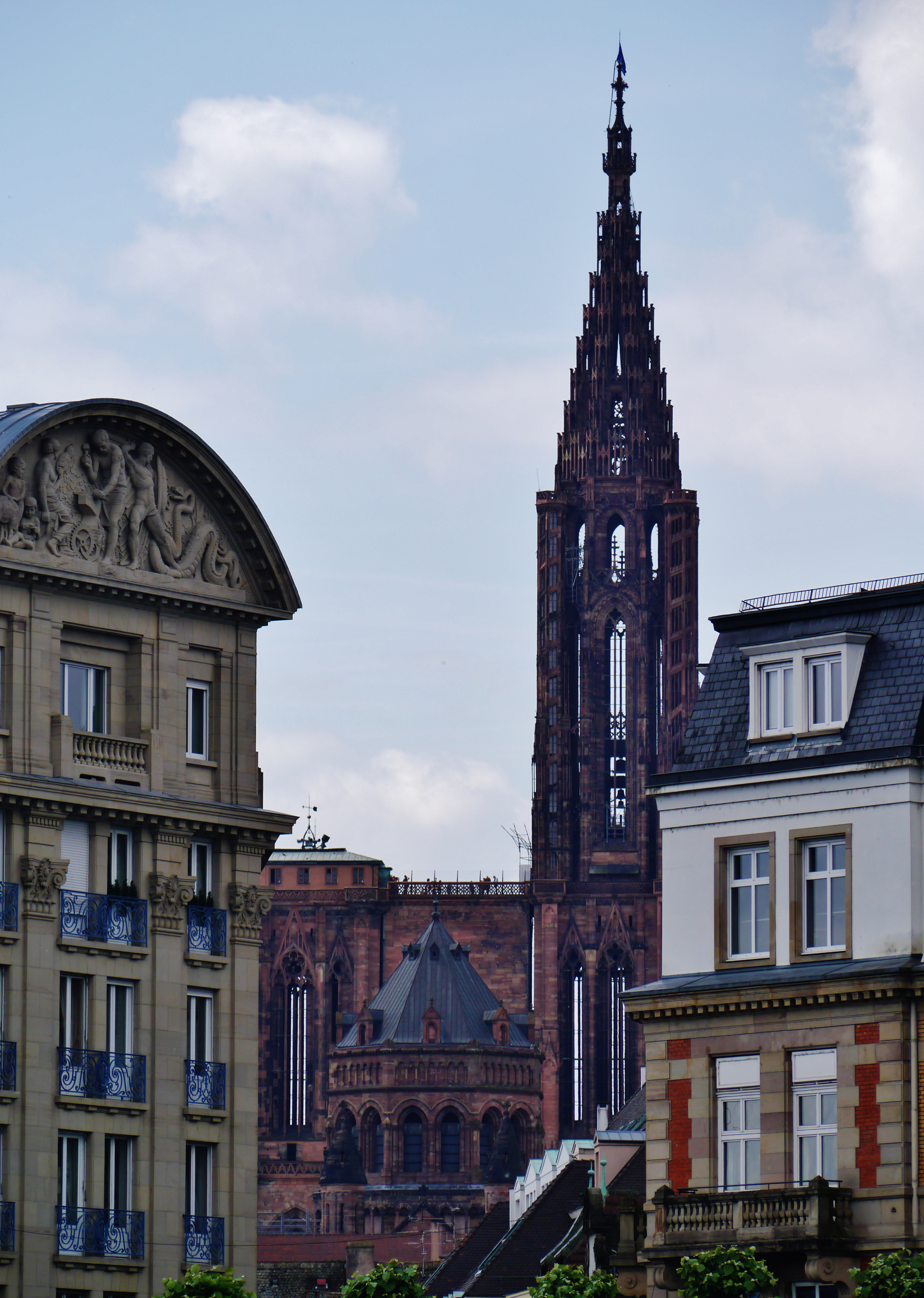
General view

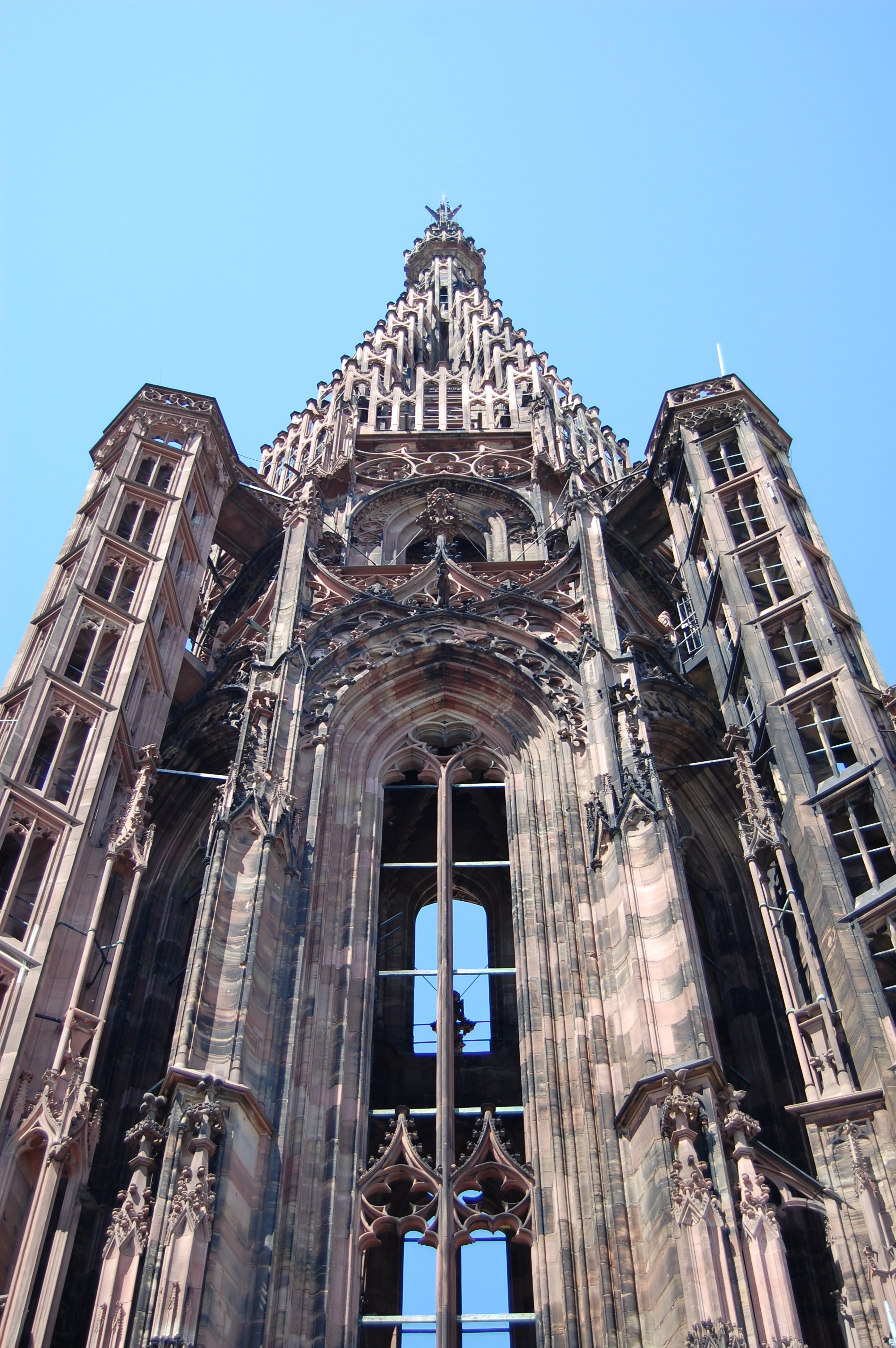
Lower portion of octagonal tower and spire

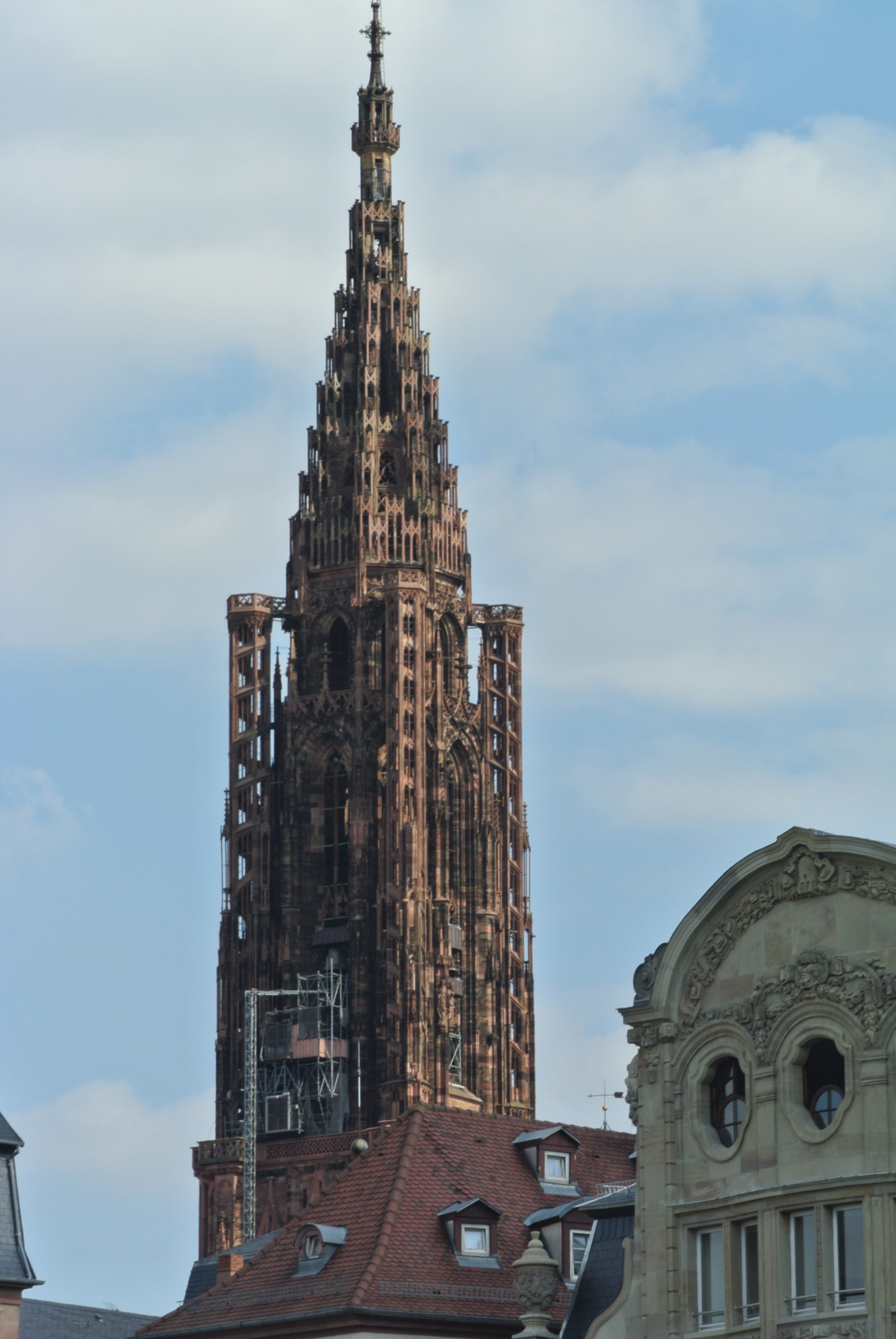
The octagonal tower and spire (remote view)

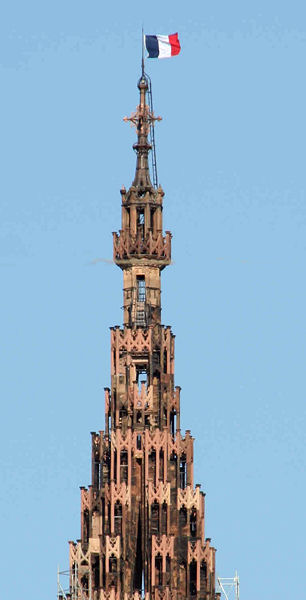
The spire

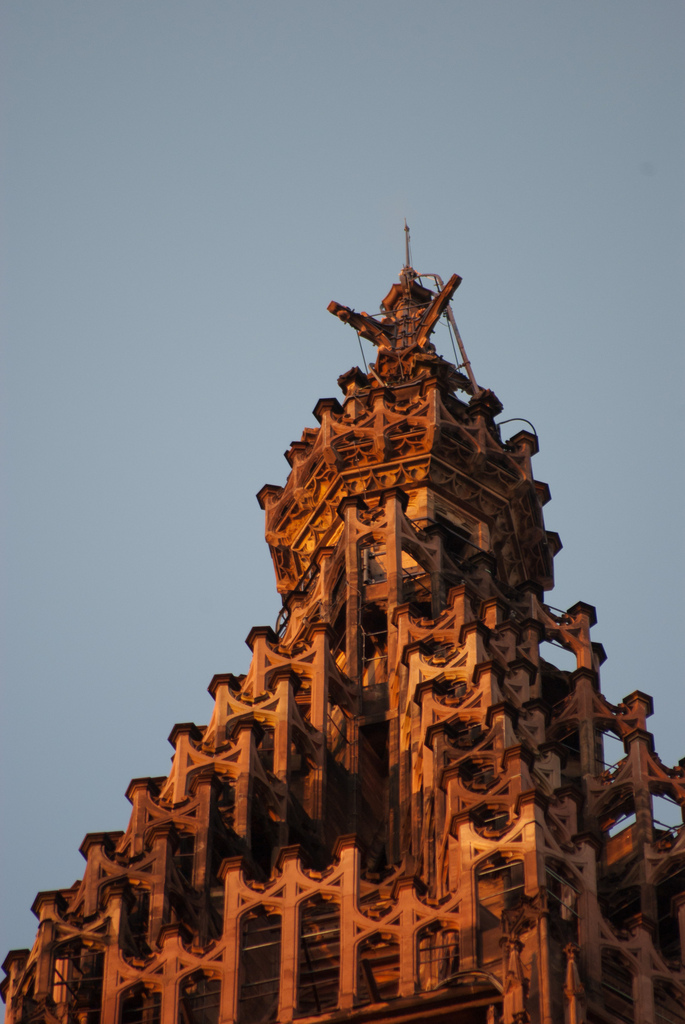
Top of the spire

The cathedral was originally intended to have two towers on the west front, but only the north one was built. The octagon tower was begun in 1399 by Ulrich Ensingen (chief architect until 1419), and crowned with a spire by his successor Johannes Hültz. The work was completed in 1439.

The eight-sided tower is three times higher than wide, more elongated than other Gothic towers of the 14th century. It is surrounded and supported by four more slender towers containing circular stairways. The walls of the tower have tall lancet openings, which show the bells and bring light into the interior, and are decorated on the exterior with interlocking pointed gables. Between the lower tower and spire there is a balustrade, almost hidden by pinnacles and other architectural decoration.

The spire above the tower is composed of eight stages of elaborate octagonal structure, linked together by interlaced arches and pinnacles, which contain a stairway to the lantern at the top. Originally the lantern was topped by a statue of the Virgin Mary, the patron saint of the cathedral, but in 1488 it was replaced by a fleuron, or flower-shaped ornament. This is crowned by the cross, which is surrounded by four smaller crosses and images of the host and chalice, elements of the liturgy of the Eucharist.

=== Crossing dome and chevet ===
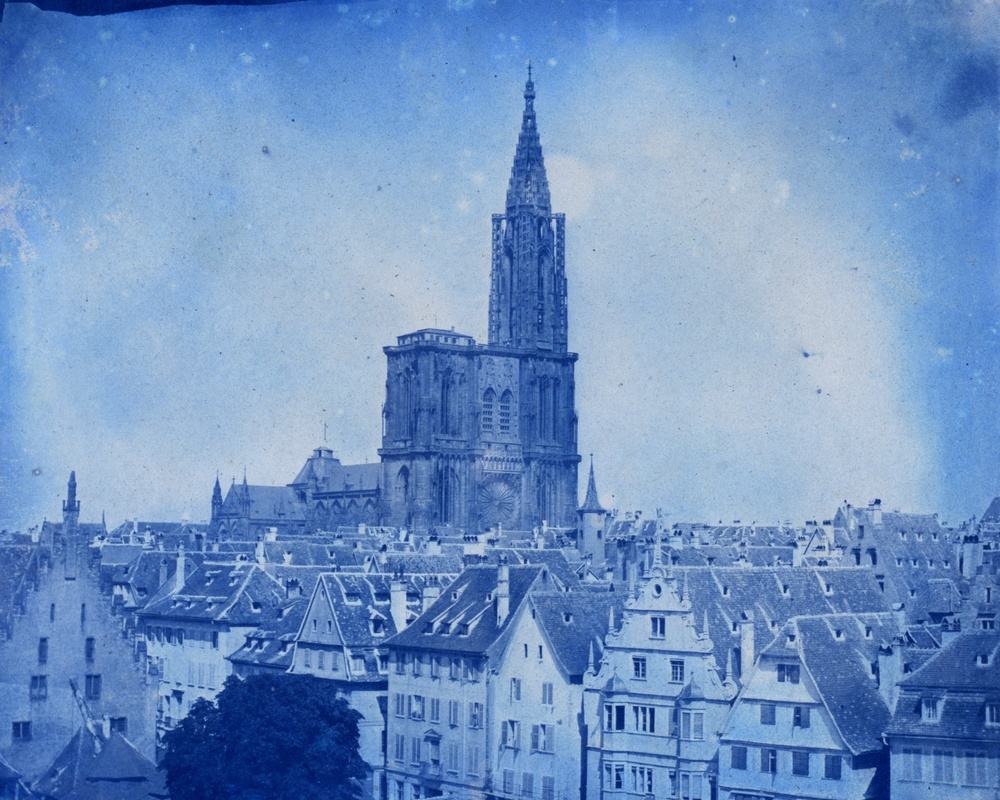
Photograph, c. 1850 (flopped image)

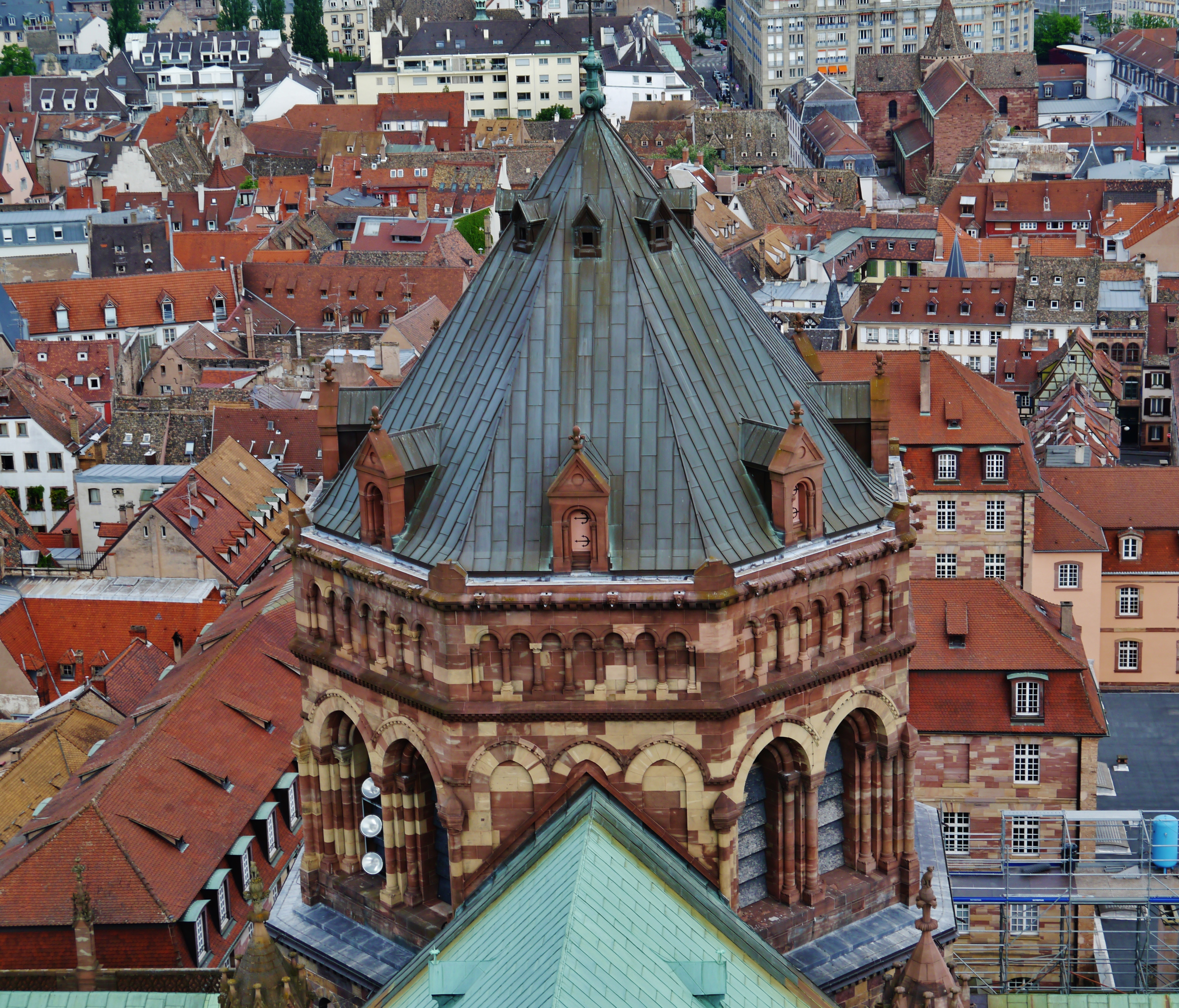
The Klotz-designed crossing dome over the transept

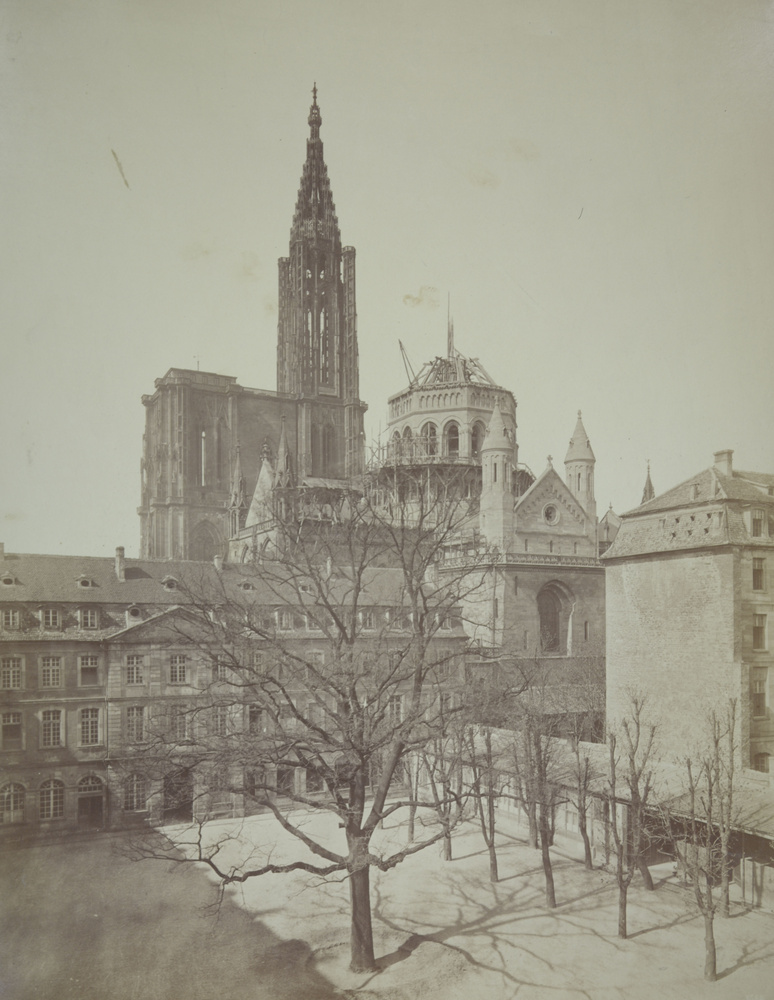
The crossing dome being built, 1878 or 1879

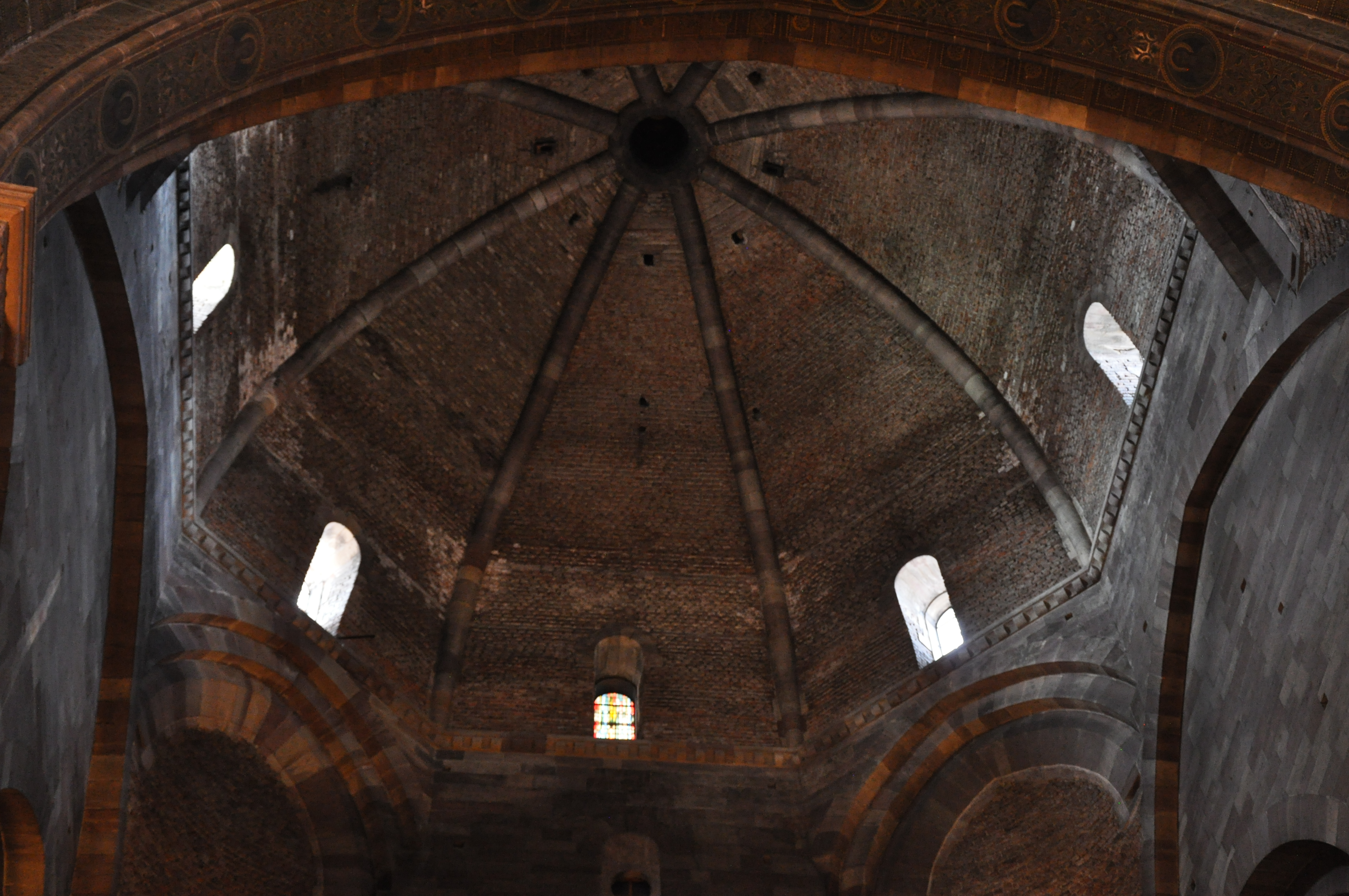
Romanesque vaults beneath the Klotz crossing dome

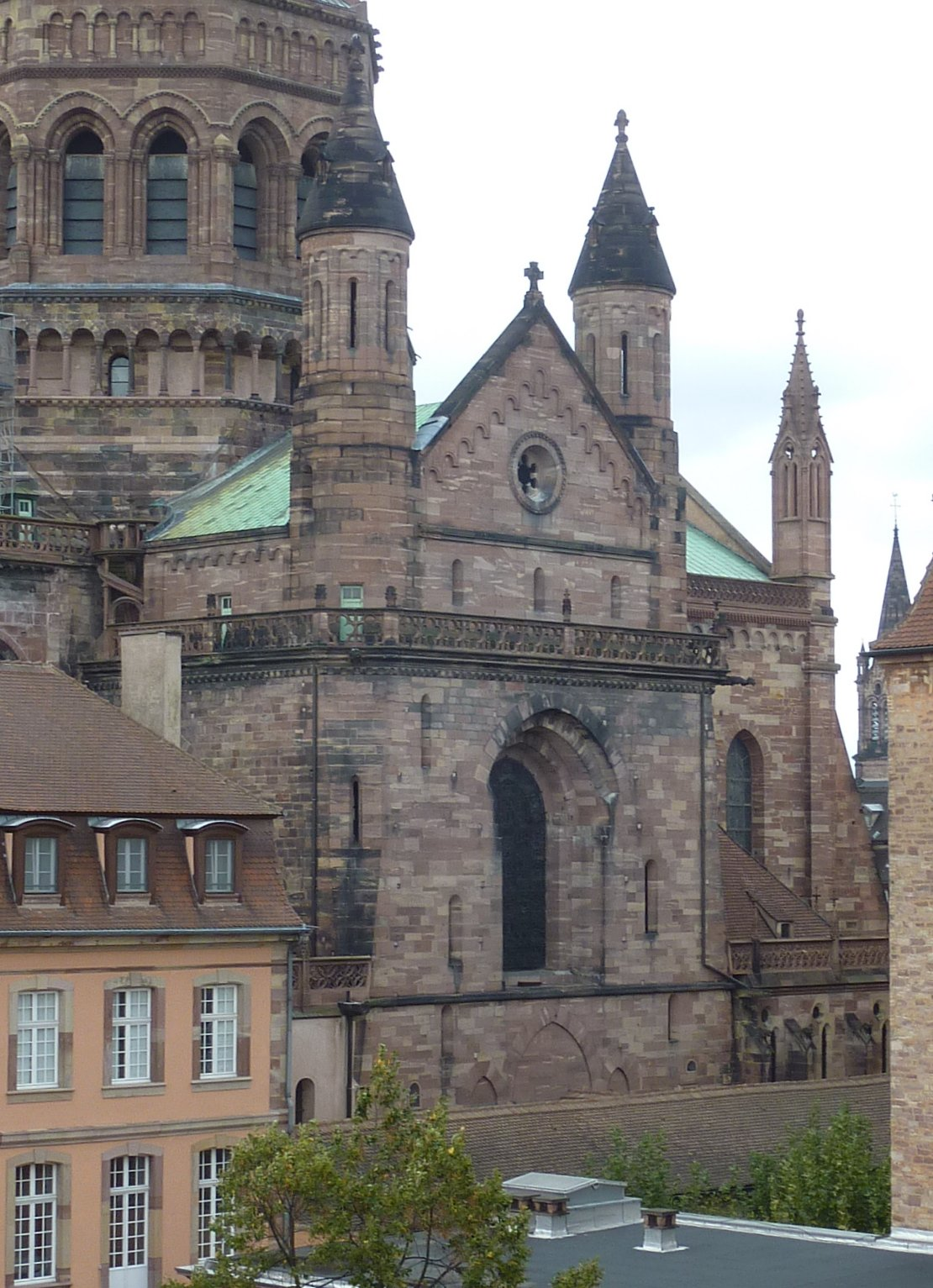
The Romanesque chevet

The crossing dome is placed over the meeting point of the transept and the choir, and, like the bell tower, has eight sides. It was constructed beginning in about 1330, following the rebuilding of the transept. Its base is topped by a gallery with pointed arches, beneath a level with large arched bays, two on each side, side, divided by clusters of columns. Above this are blind arcades, an ornate cornice, and then a pointed roof with a pair of dormer or skylight windows, a small window above a large one, on each side, which brought light to the choir below. The medieval crossing dome's aspect was altered several times over the centuries. The currently visible, much higher crossing dome was designed in grand Romanesque Revival style by the architect Gustave Klotz, after the original dome had been heavily damaged by Prussian shelling during the Siege of Strasbourg. Klotz's dome was in turn heavily damaged by bombing raids during World War II, and restored between 1988 and 1992.

The chevet, at the northeast end of the cathedral, close to the transept, has vestiges that go back to the Romanesque cathedral, particularly at the lower levels. It looks over the former cloister of the canons of the cathedral. It is the least decorated side of the cathedral. A large arched bay occupies the central portion, just below a balustrade. Above that are three narrow windows and then a triangular gable with a small circular oculus window and blind arches. The face is flanked by two cylindrical towers with narrow lancet windows and pointed roofs. The walls are pierced with narrow slits, like a medieval fortress, giving it a very military appearance.

Two chapels, devoted to Saint Andrew and Saint John the Baptist, were attached to the two sides of the apse. The Chapel of John the Baptist preserves its thick Romanesque walls and two Romanesque windows.

== Interior ==
=== Narthex ===
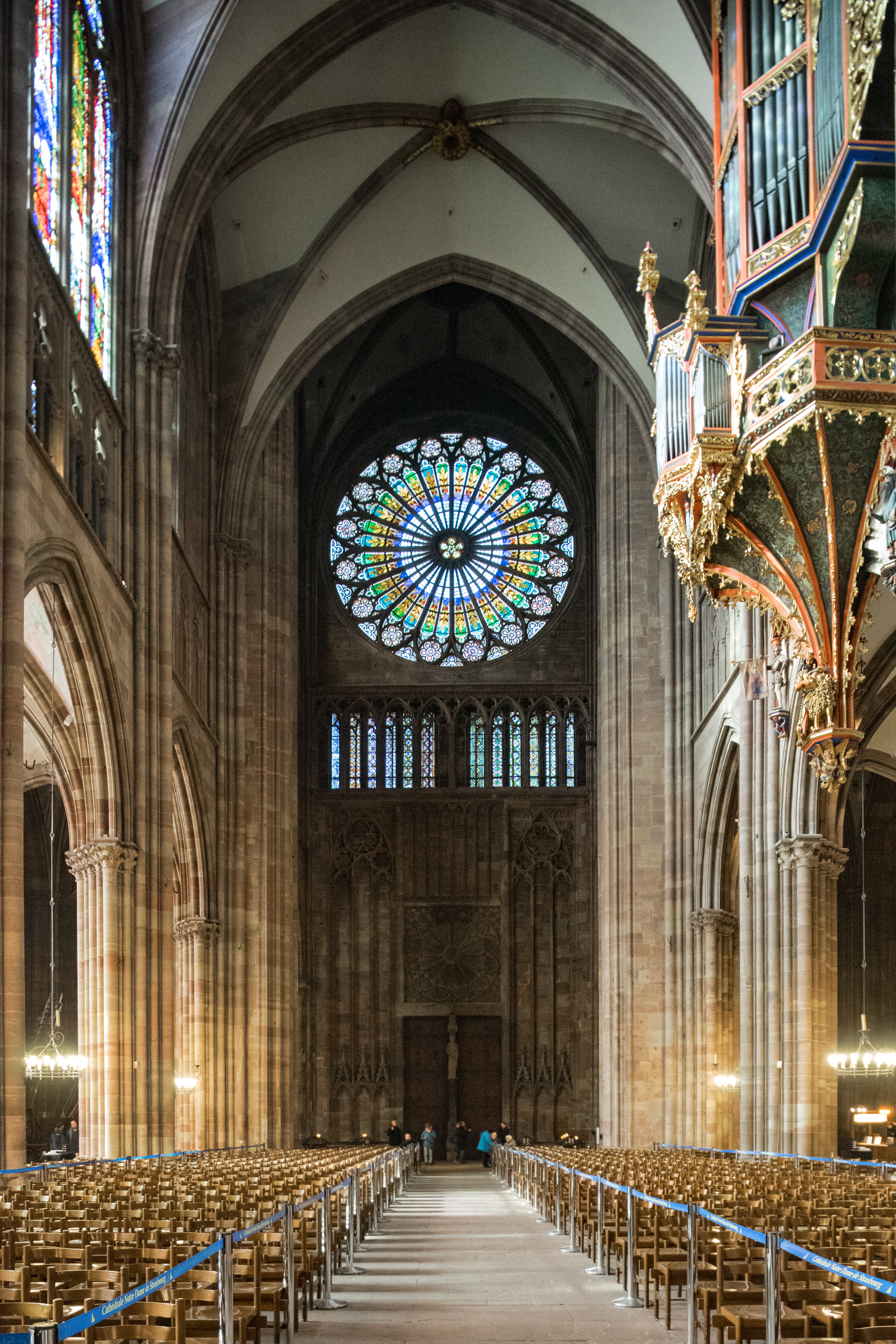
The narthex of the cathedral and massive pillars supporting the tower, seen from the central nave

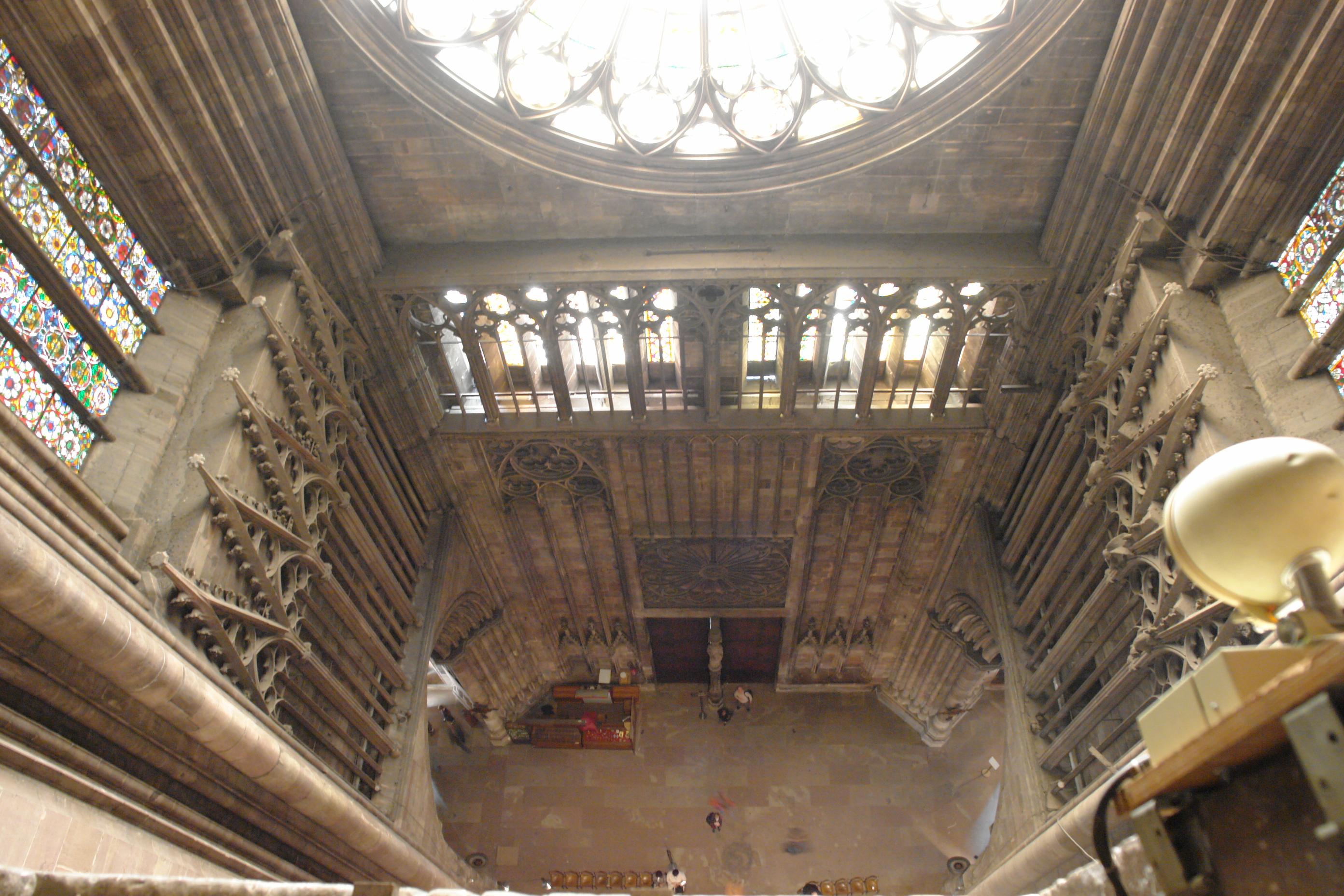
Interior of the narthex, looking down

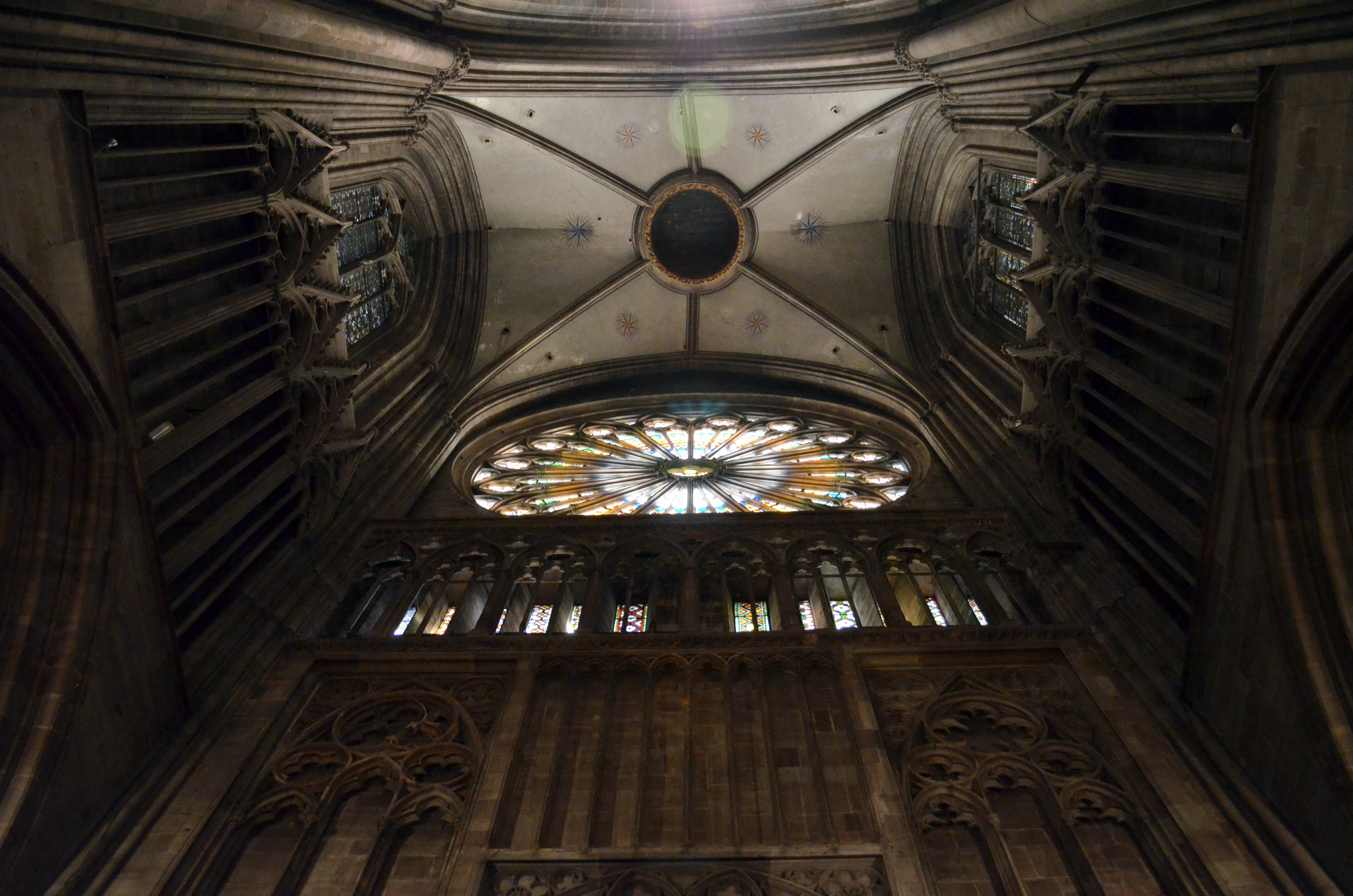
Interior of the narthex, looking up

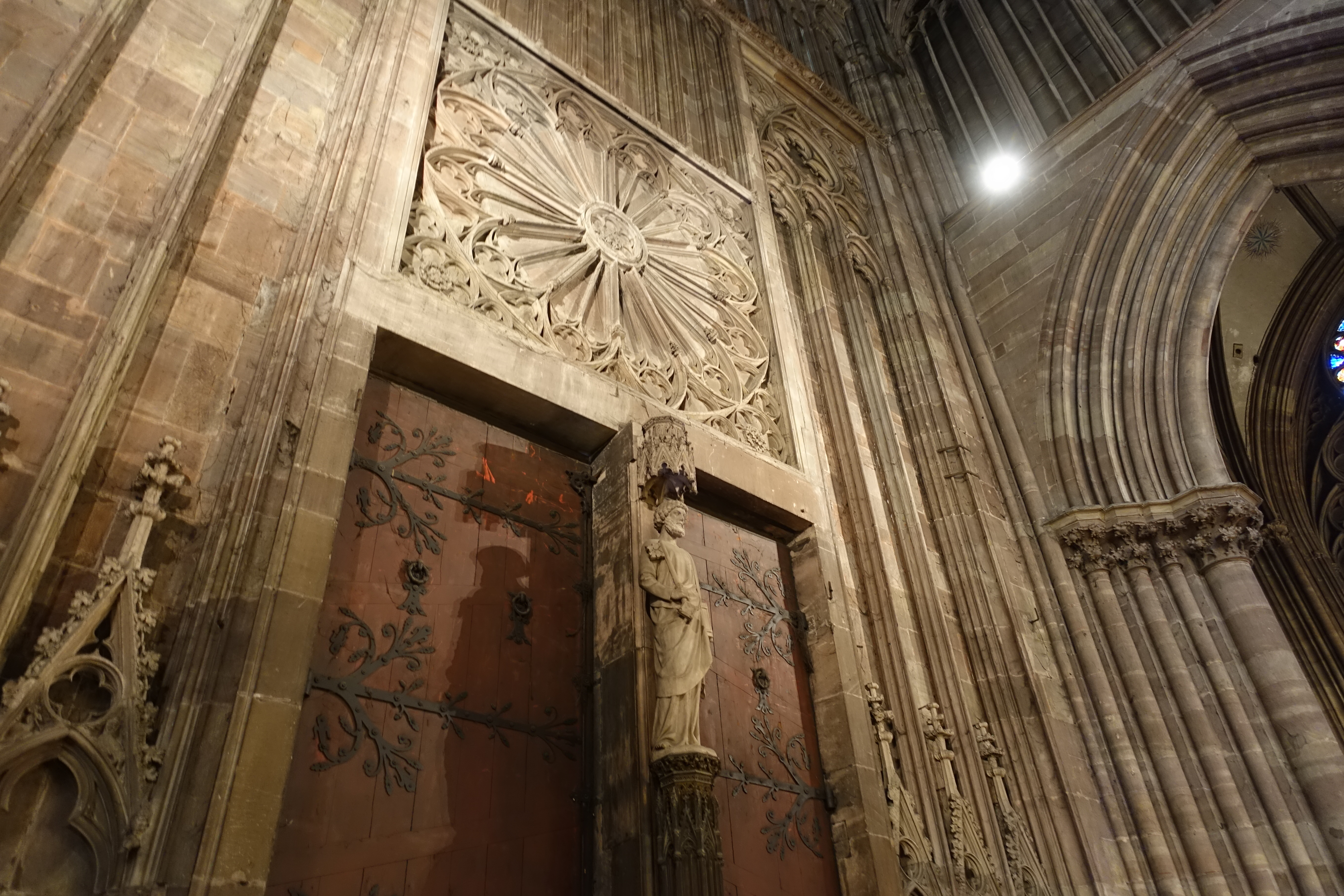
Inside of west front doors, with blind rose window and column-statue of St. Peter

The narthex is the portion of the cathedral just inside the west front, beneath the tower. It is separated from the nave by two massive pillars, 8.5 by 5 meters, which support the tower above. The primary decorative element is the rose window, added between 1320 and 1340, and substantially restored since. Rays of yellow glass radiate outwards like a sun, surrounded mosaic-like pieces of green and blue and by small oculi with red floral designs. The tracery and decoration of the interior are very much like of that exterior, with blind galleries and delicate parallel vertical lines, like the strings of a harp. A pointed arch frames the window, and a row of blind arches at the lower level completes the decoration.

The reverse of the central doors of the portal has a column statue of Saint Peter holding the keys of the kingdom and above it a blind rose, without glass, a miniature version of the large rose window above it.

=== Stained glass of narthex ===
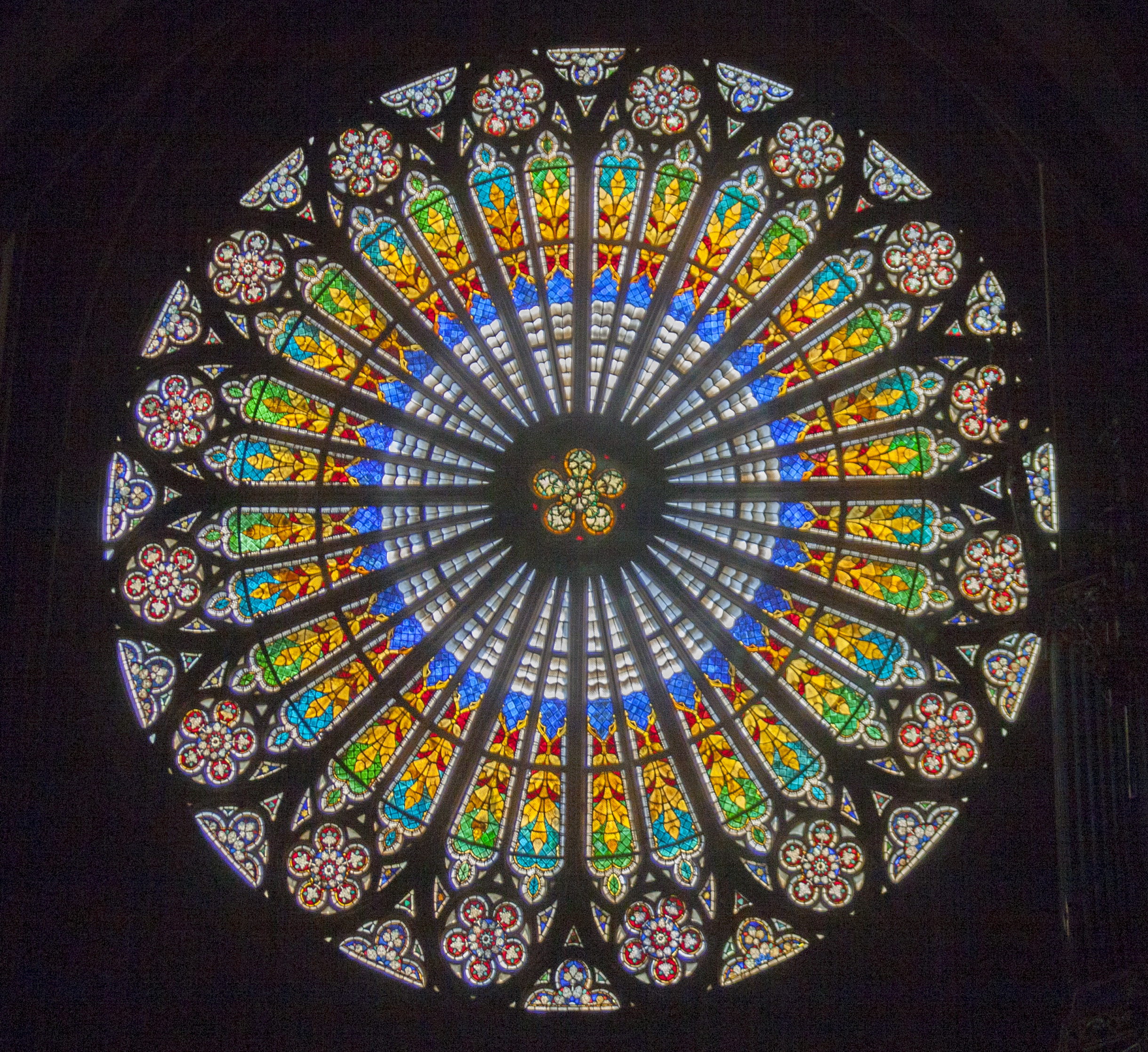
The rose window in the narthex

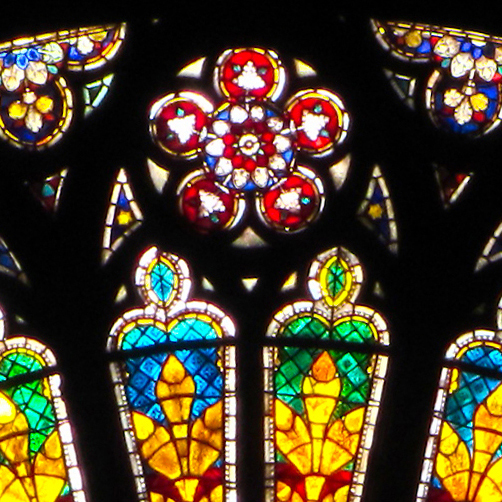
Detail of the rose window

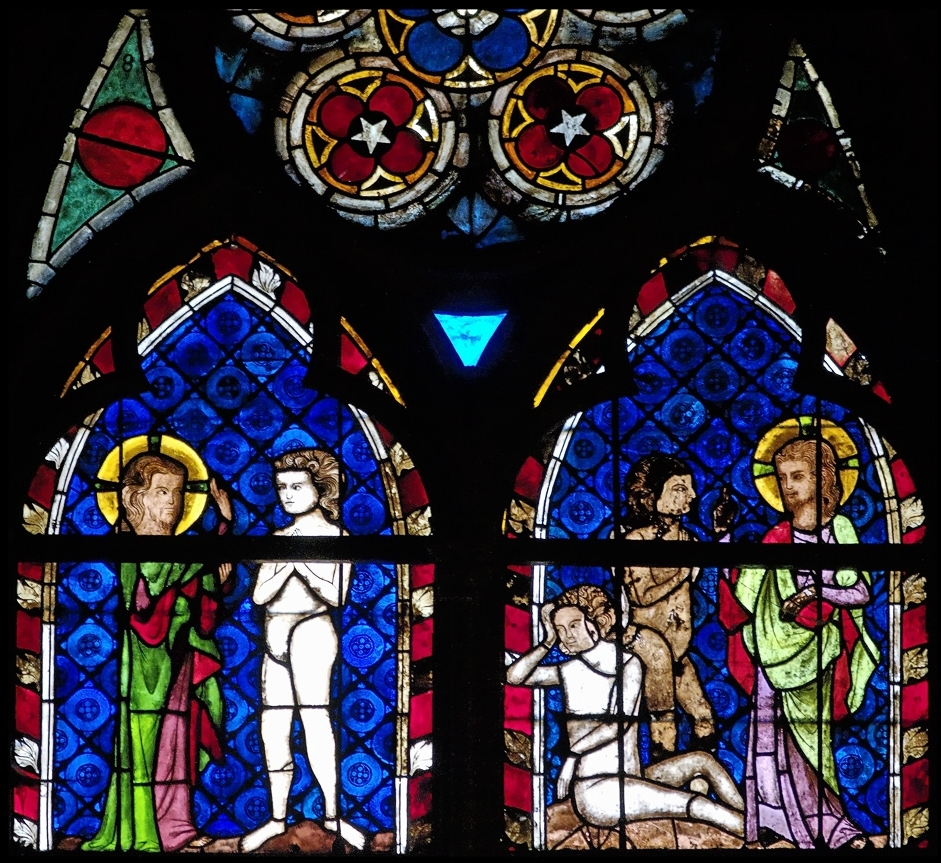
The creation of Adam and Eve (Narthex) (1280–1345)

The lower bay on the south has stained glass windows that depict the Last Judgement, while the north bay windows illustrate twelve episodes from the Book of Genesis, including the creation of Adam and Eve, the original sin, the expulsion from Paradise, and Noah's ark. These windows date to about 1345.

=== Nave ===
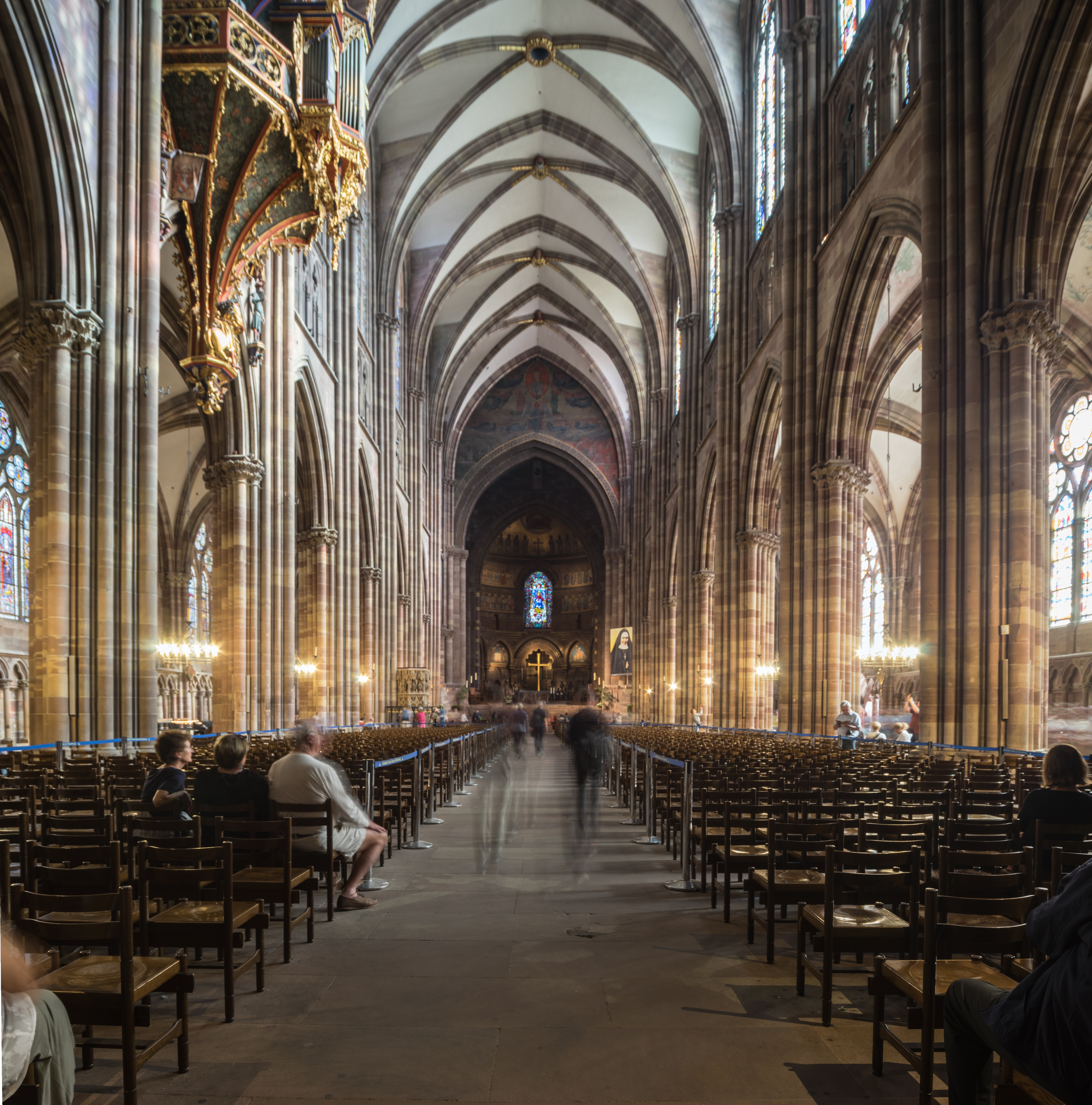
The Nave, looking toward the apse

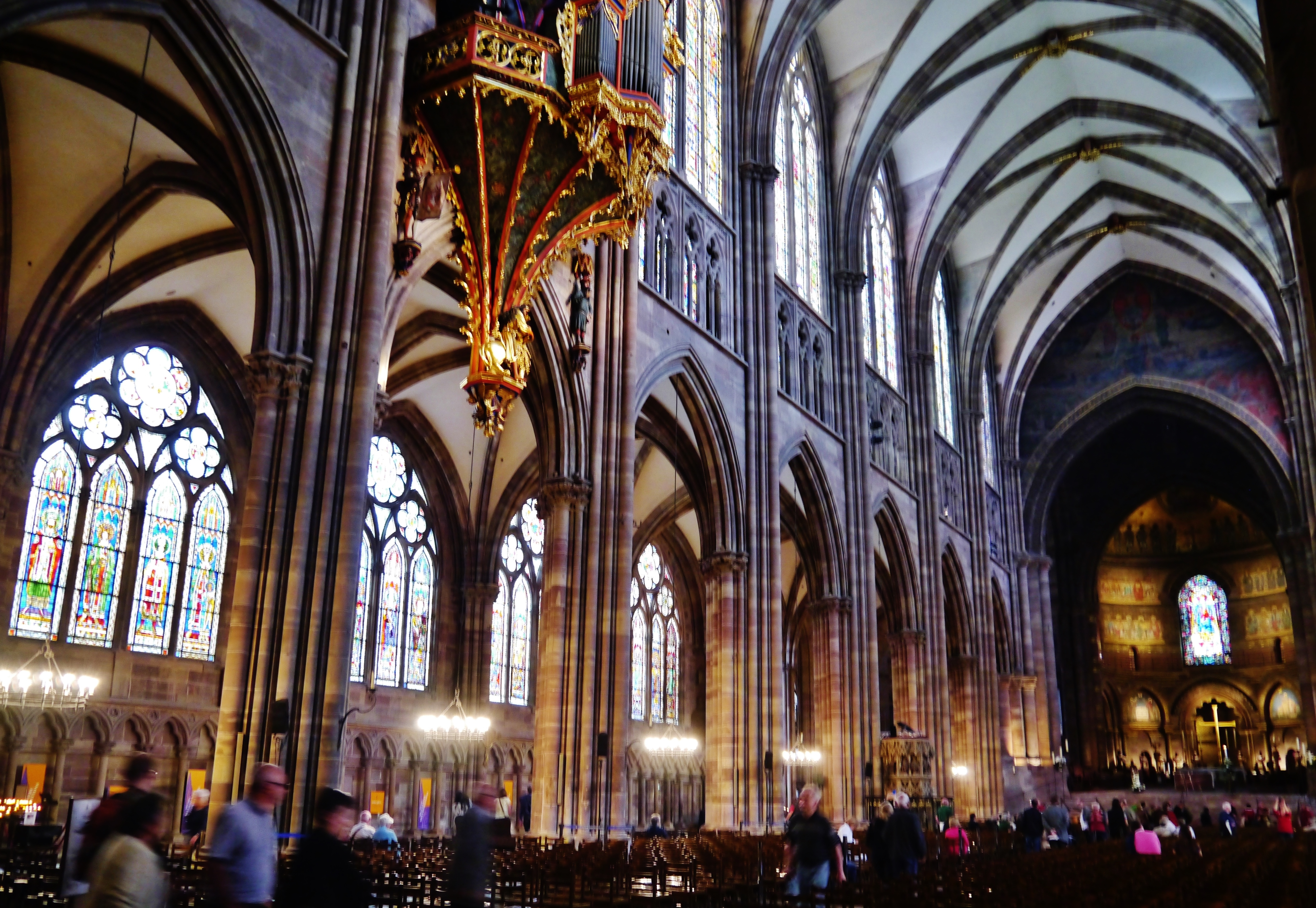
The three levels of the nave; arcades and collateral aisles (bottom); triforium, and upper windows

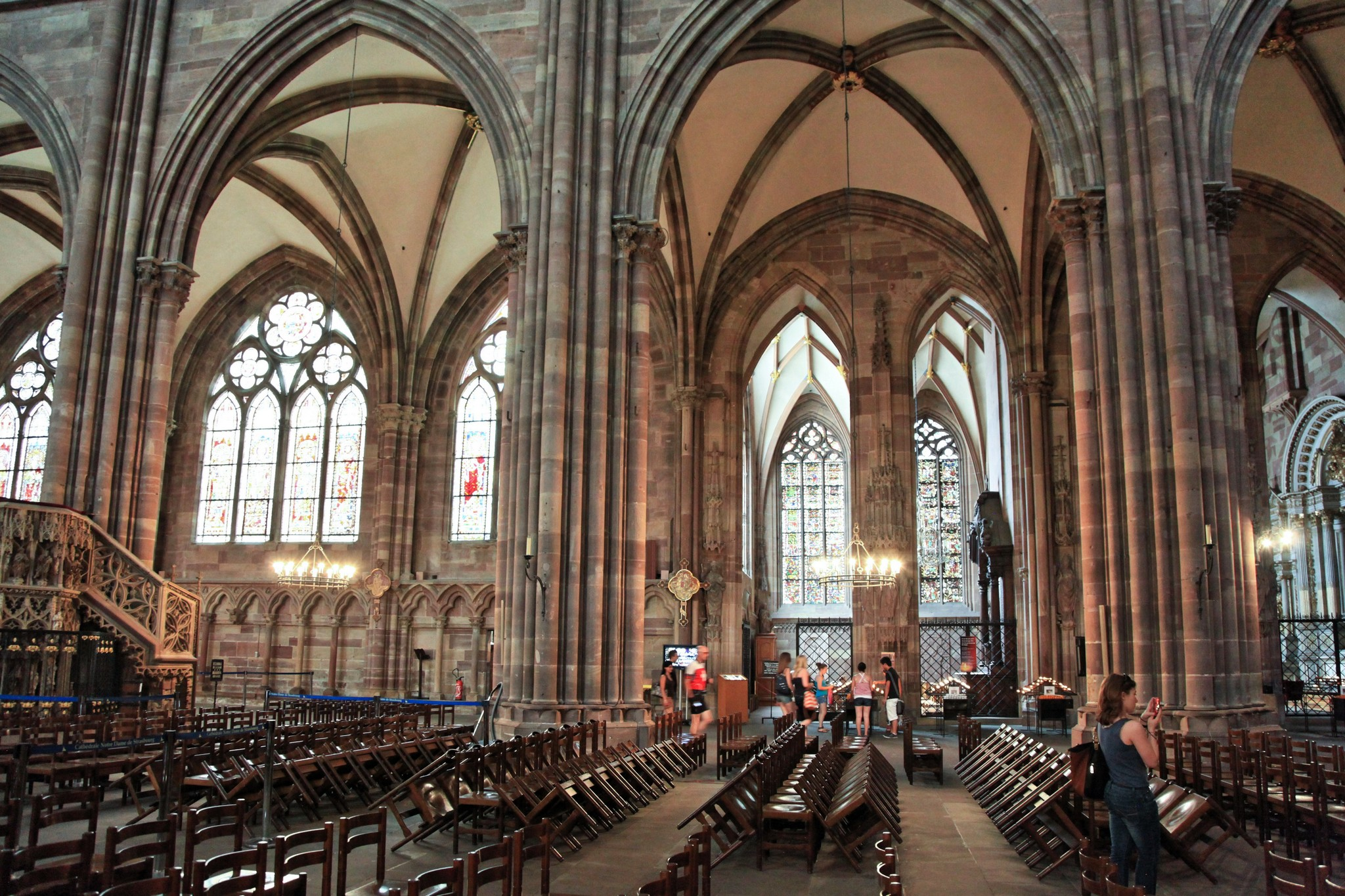
Side of the nave and collateral aisle

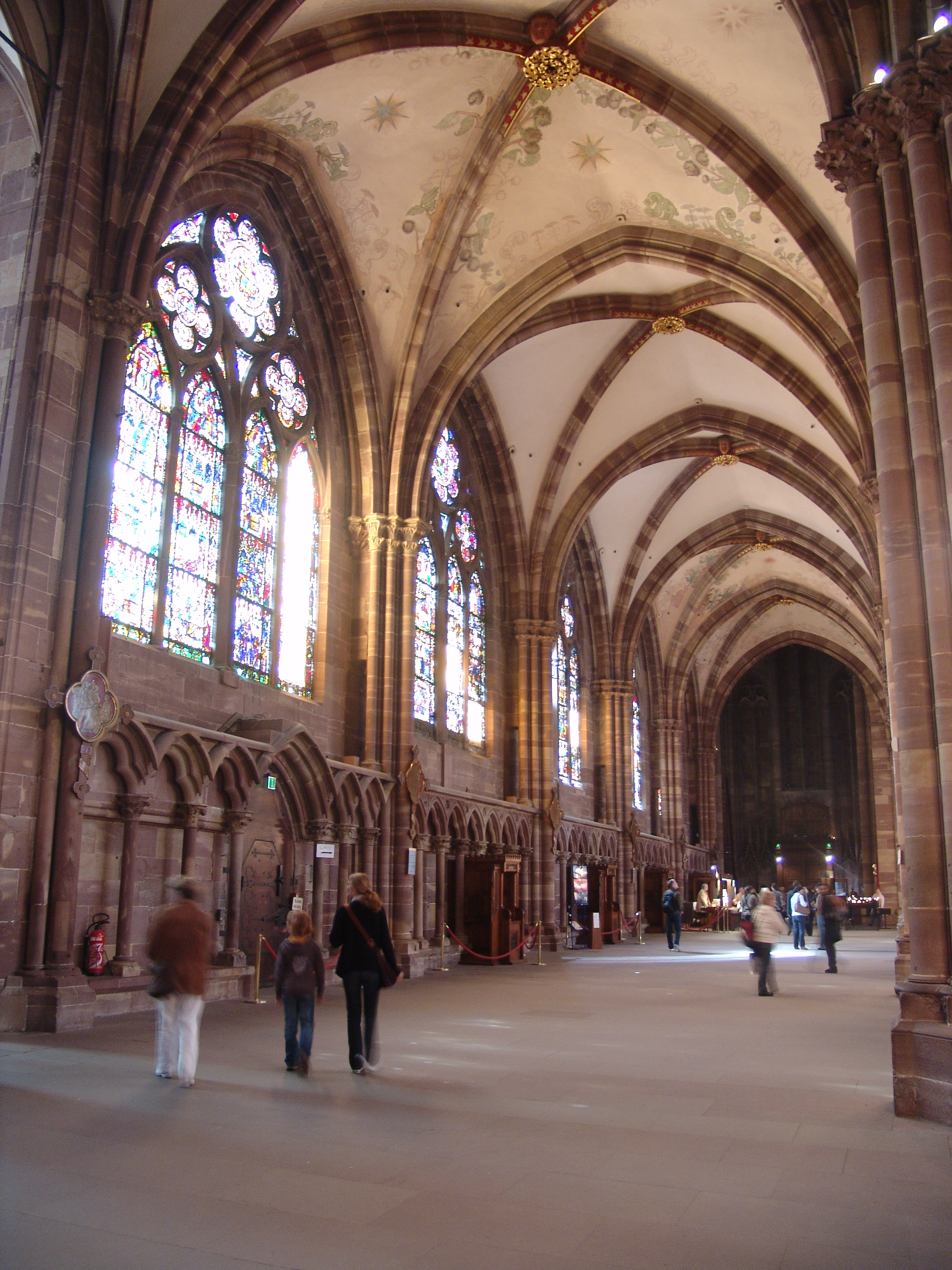
Northern collateral

The nave is the section of the cathedral between the narthex and the choir where ordinary parishioners are seated and worship. At Strasbourg it is 61.5 metres (202 ft) long and 16 metres (52 ft) wide, not counting the two collateral aisles, which are each 10.41 metres (34.2 ft) wide. In height to the vaults it is 32.616 metres (107.01 ft). It takes its reddish-brown color from the sandstone of the Vosges mountains.

The nave is dominated by the two rows of massive pillars. Each pillar bundles sixteen smaller columns, of which five reach upward to support the vaults overhead. The meeting points between the columns and the vault ribs is decorated with vegetal sculpture. The elevation has the traditional High Gothic or Rayonnant Gothic three levels; large arcades below, with windows on the collateral aisles; a narrow triforium, or gallery, also with windows, for passing along the walls; and above that, of equal height with the arcades the upper windows which reach up into the vaults. The upper windows at Strasbourg fill the entire space between the triforium and the vaults. An additional element of decoration is given by the small sculpted, painted, and gilded heads on the keystones of the vaults, where the ribs meet.

=== Nave stained glass - The Emperor Windows ===
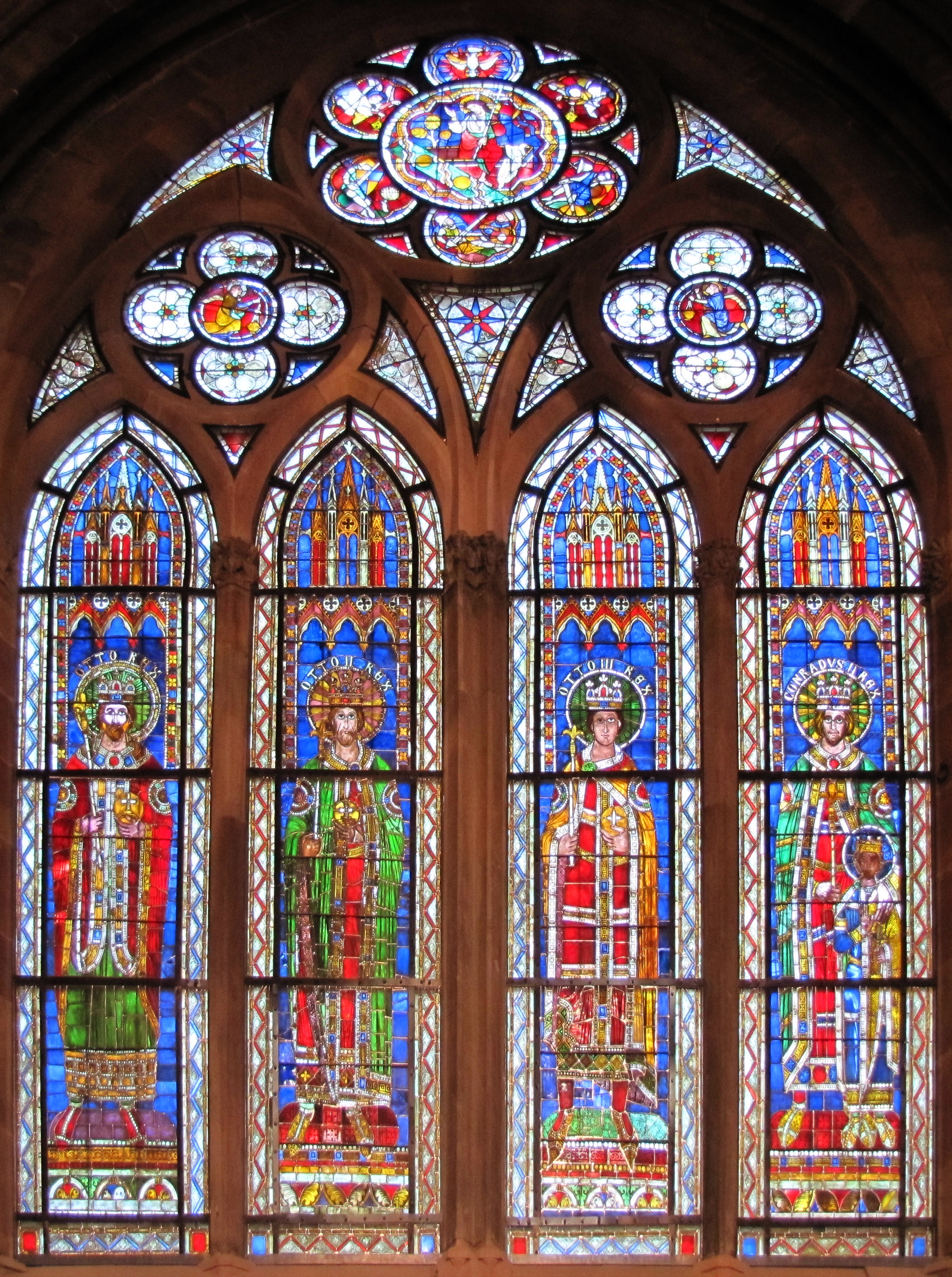
A set of "Emperor" windows, (Otto I, Otto II, Otto III, Conrad II, Henry III)

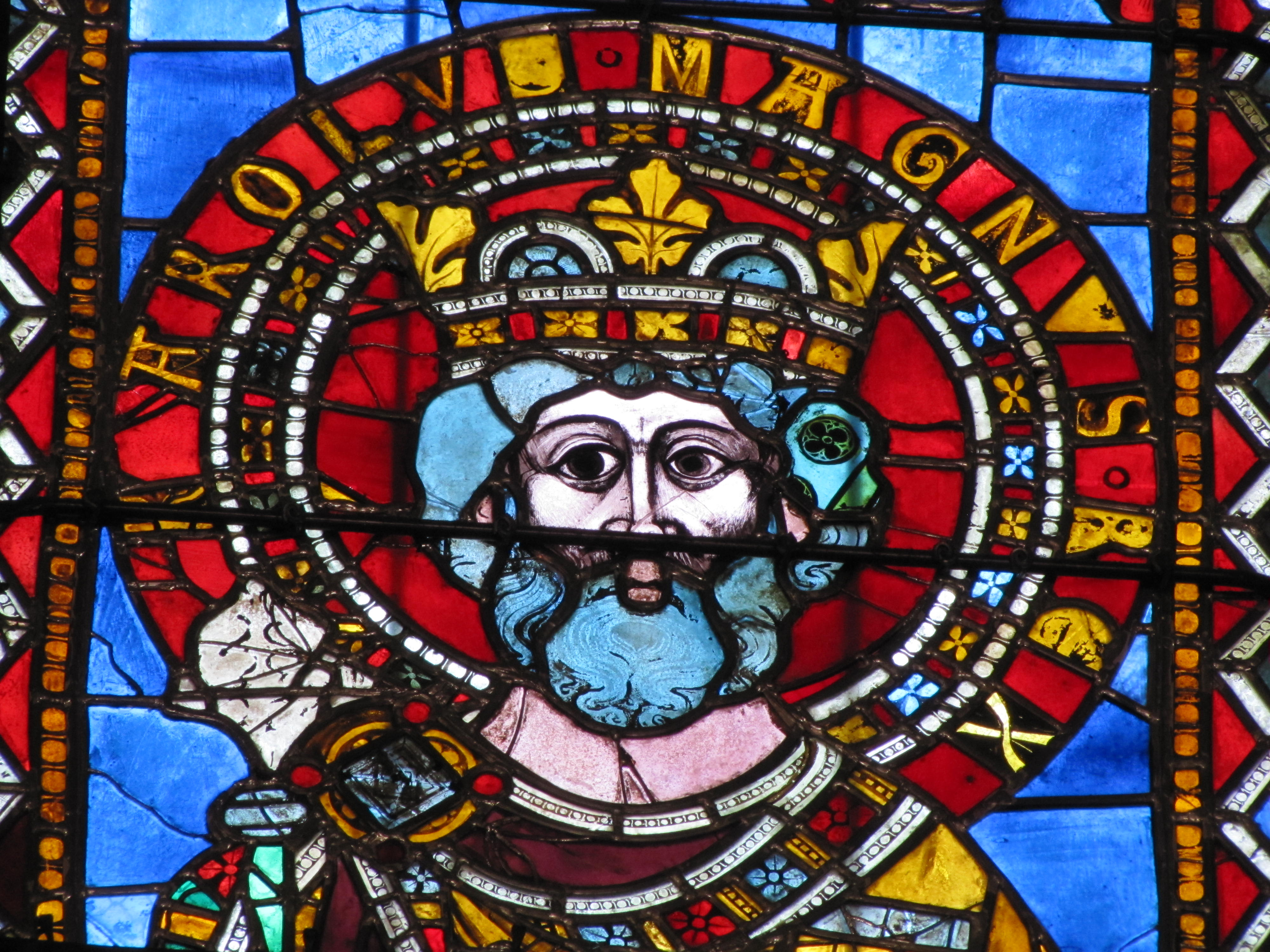
The head of Charlemagne

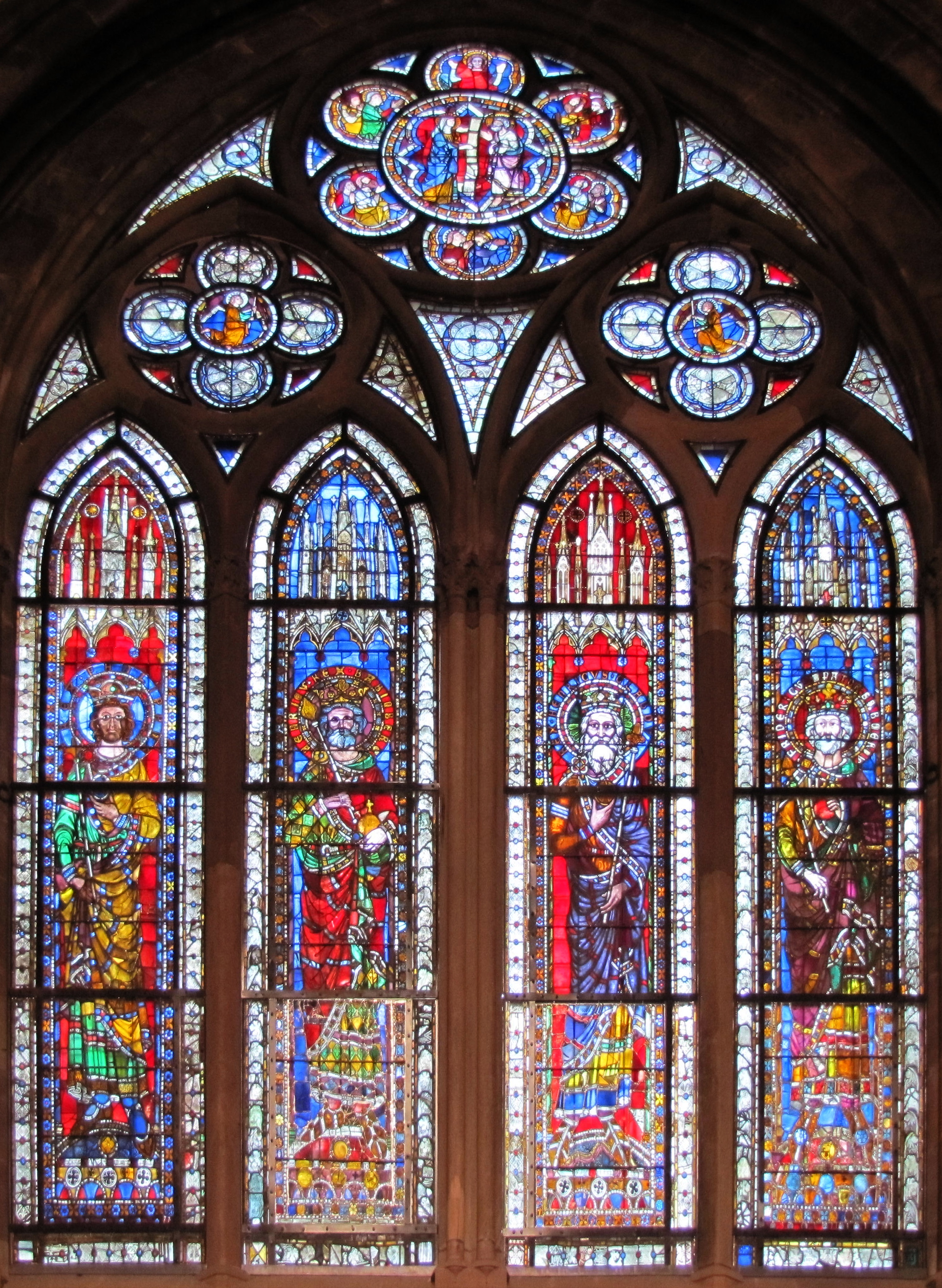
Emperors Philip of Swabia, Henry IV, Henry V, Frederick II

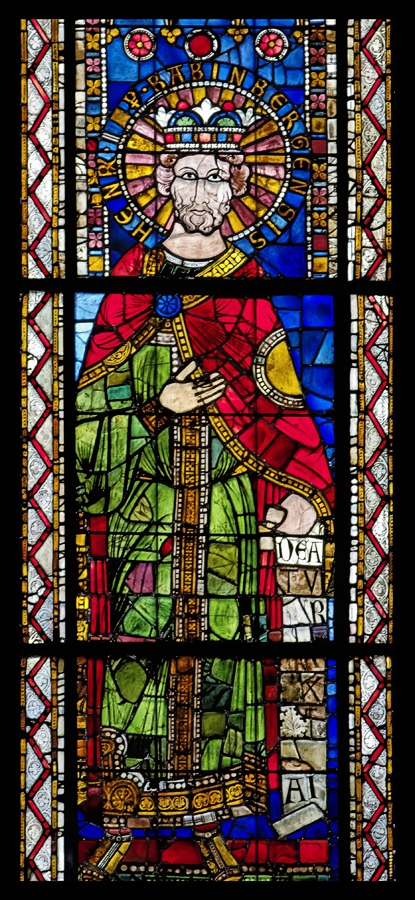
Henry II of Bamberg, with head remounted on earlier body (1522)

The five lower bays on the north side contain some of the oldest stained glass of the cathedral, installed in the old Romanesque cathedral in about 1180. When the nave was rebuilt in Gothic style in the 13th century, the old windows were reinstalled in random locations. In 1877, architect Gustave Klotz reconstituted the windows in their original arrangement. The windows are devoted to nine Emperors of the Holy Roman Empire. Each holds a sceptre in his right hand and an orb in the left hand, symbols of their responsibility as both sovereigns and religious figures. Some of the windows were assembled with glass from different periods: in the windows devoted to the Emperors Frederick II and Henry II of Bamberg, the heads were made between 1250 and 1275, but in 1522 were remounted onto the bodies of other kings from earlier windows made in about 1180. The small circular windows above the Emperors depict scenes from the life of Christ.

The complete Emperor windows are:

- First Emperor Window: HENRICUS REX (presumably Henry the Fowler), FRIDERICUS REX (Frederick I), HENRICUS BABINBERGENSIS (Henry II of Bamberg);
- Second Emperor Window: OTTO REX (Otto I), OTTO II REX (Otto II), OTTO III REX (Otto III), CONRADUS II REX (Conrad II), the latter depicted together with an imperial prince who may be Henry III;
- Third Emperor Window: REX PHILIPPUS (Philip of Swabia), HENRICUS REX BABINBERG[ensis] (possibly Henry II), REX HENRICUS CLAUDUS (Henry the lame = also possibly Henry II), FRIDERICUS IMP[er]ATOR SUBMERSUS (Frederick I);
- Fourth Emperor Window: KAROLUS D[ic]C[tu]S MARTEL PATER BIPPINI (Charles Martel), KAROLUS MAGNUS REX (Charlemagne), REX BIPPINUS P[ate]R KAROLI (Pepin the Short), LUDEVICUS REX FILIUS KAROLI (Louis the Pious);
- Fifth Emperor Window: LOTHARIUS ROMANORUM IMPERATOR (Lothair I), LUDEWICUS FILIUS LOTHARII VIII (identification unclear, may be Louis II of Italy), LUDEWICUS FILIUS LOTHARI VI (identification unclear), KAROLUS REX IUNIOR (identified with Charles of Provence).

The upper windows of the nave depict eighty-four saints, added by various artists between 1250 and 1275.

On the south side of the nave, the upper walls have windows depicting female saints, including local saints from Alsace or Strasbourg. They wear diadems and have flowers in their hair, and carry twigs of the tree of life, or fruit. On the south side, the upper windows depict soldiers, popes, bishops, and other masculine figures.

The windows of the triforium, between the upper and lower window, contain 19th-century reconstitutions of early windows depicting the ancestors of Christ, but little of the original glass remains.

=== Pulpit ===
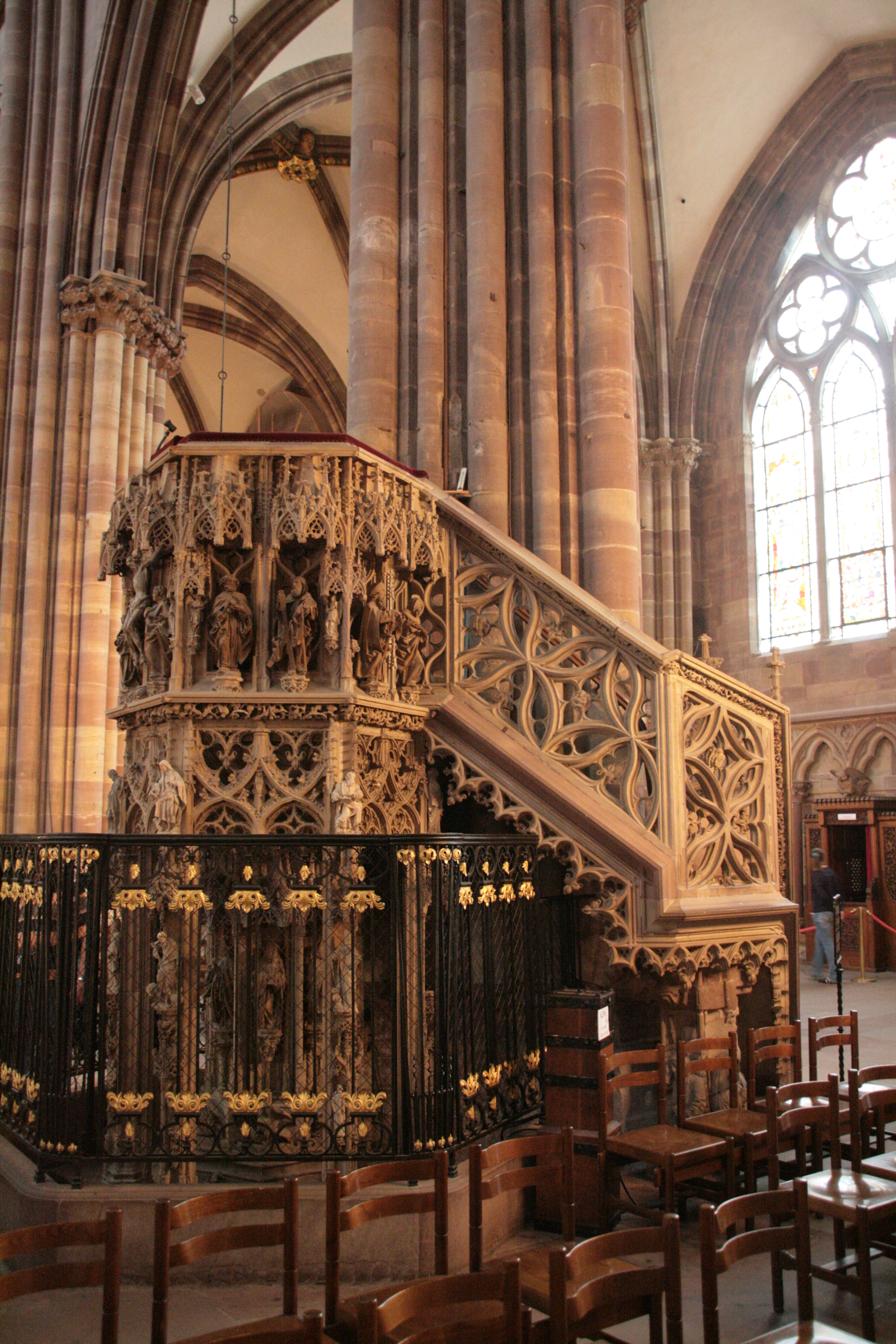
Pulpit by Hans Hammer (1485)

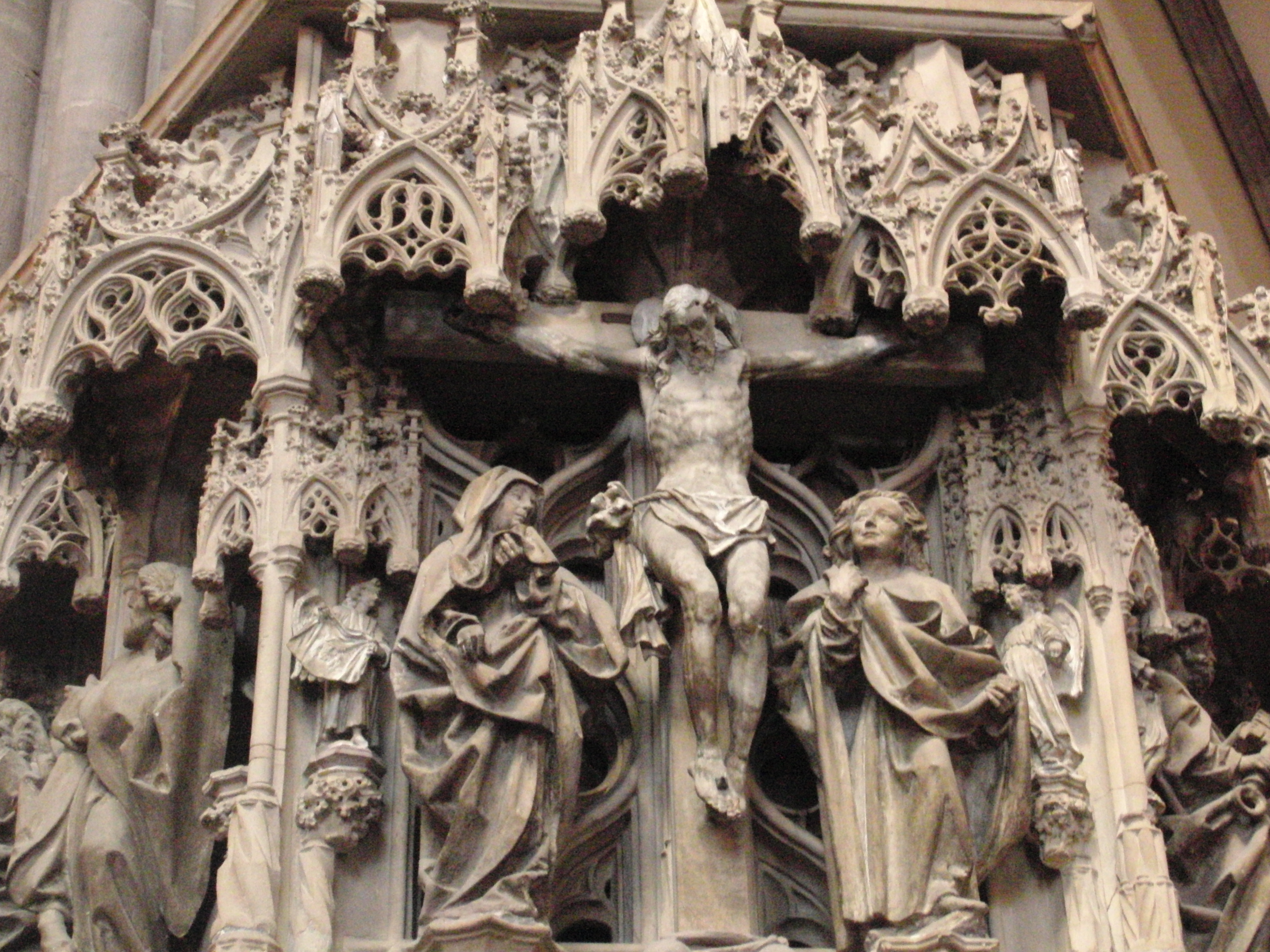
Detail of the pulpit sculpture

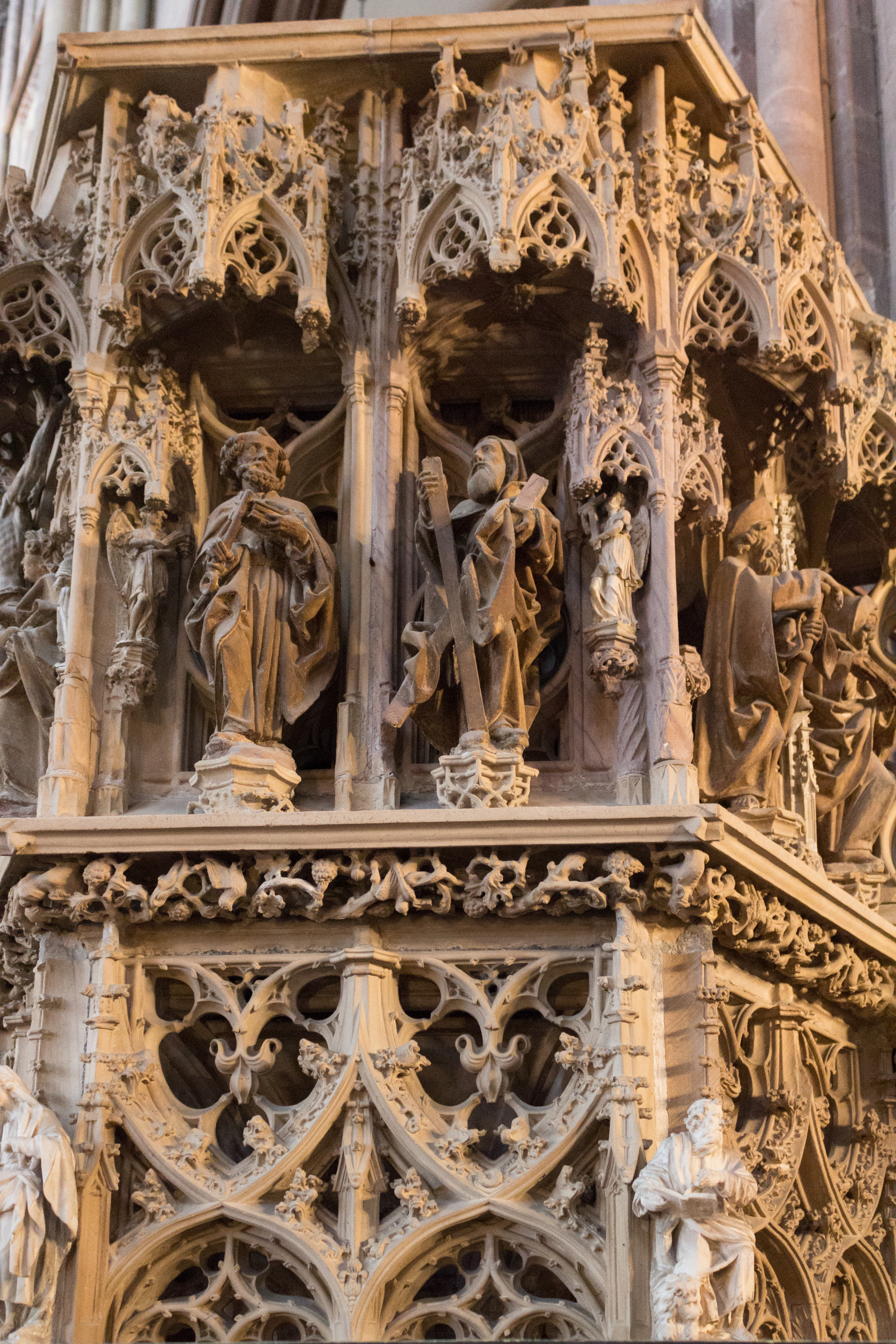
Detail of the pulpit

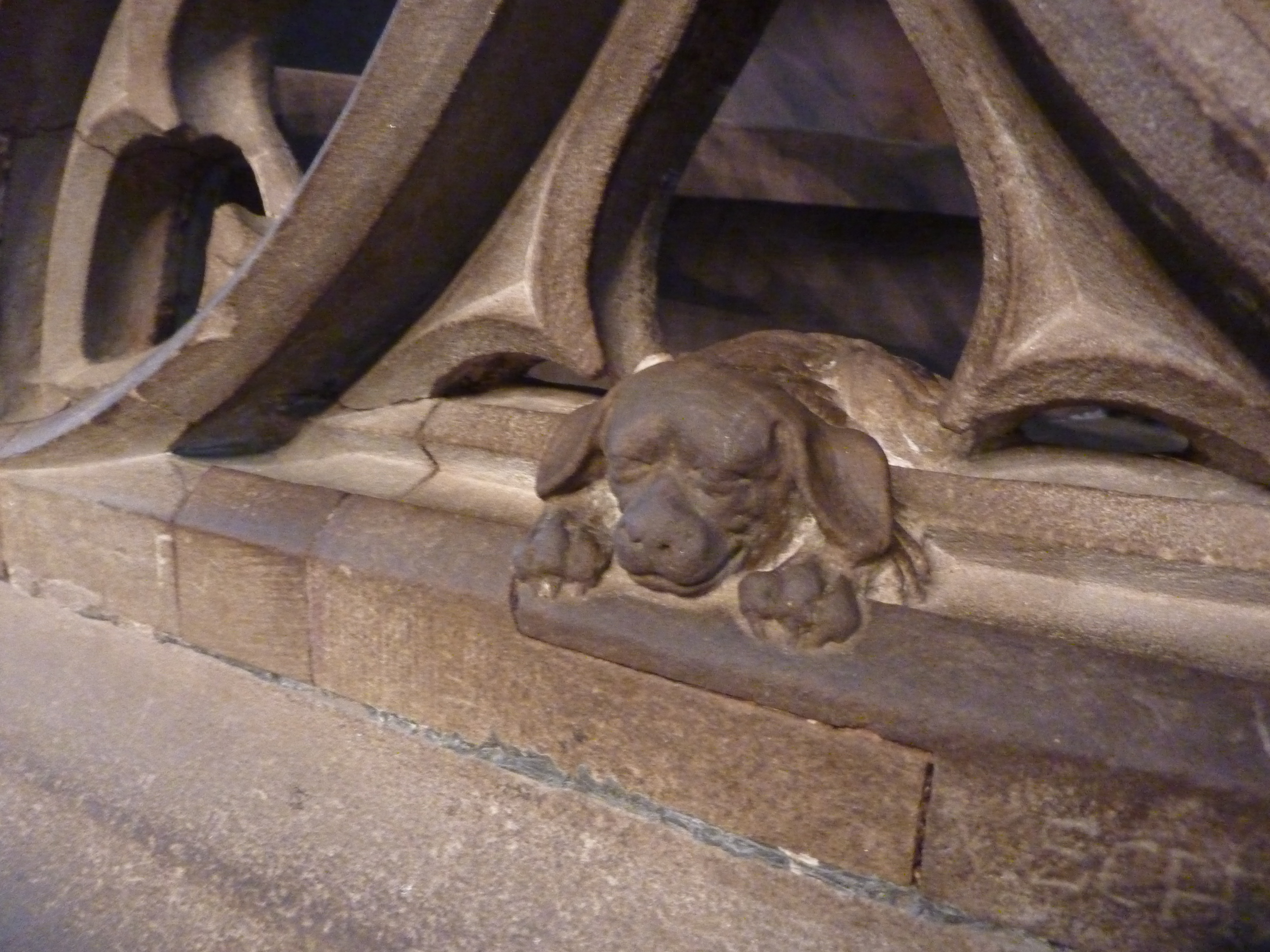
The dog of the preacher Johann Geiler von Kaysersberg, on the steps, mourning his master

The pulpit, attached to the fourth pillar of the north side of the nave, was sculpted in 1485 following a design by Hans Hammer. It is reached by a stairway with a curling sculpted design called "butterfly wings". The pulpit itself, in the form of a very ornate corbeille or basket, is entirely covered with colonettes, gables, pinnacles, and niches filled with sculpture, including images of Christ on the cross, a crowned Virgin Mary, Apostles, the Crucifixion, and well as Kings and doctors of the Church. A statue on the west side of the pillar represents a famed preacher contemporary with the cathedral; Johann Geiler von Kaysersberg (d. 1510); a small sculpture along the railing of the stairs depicts Geiler's dog, mourning his master on steps of the pulpit where he once preached.

=== The grand organ ===
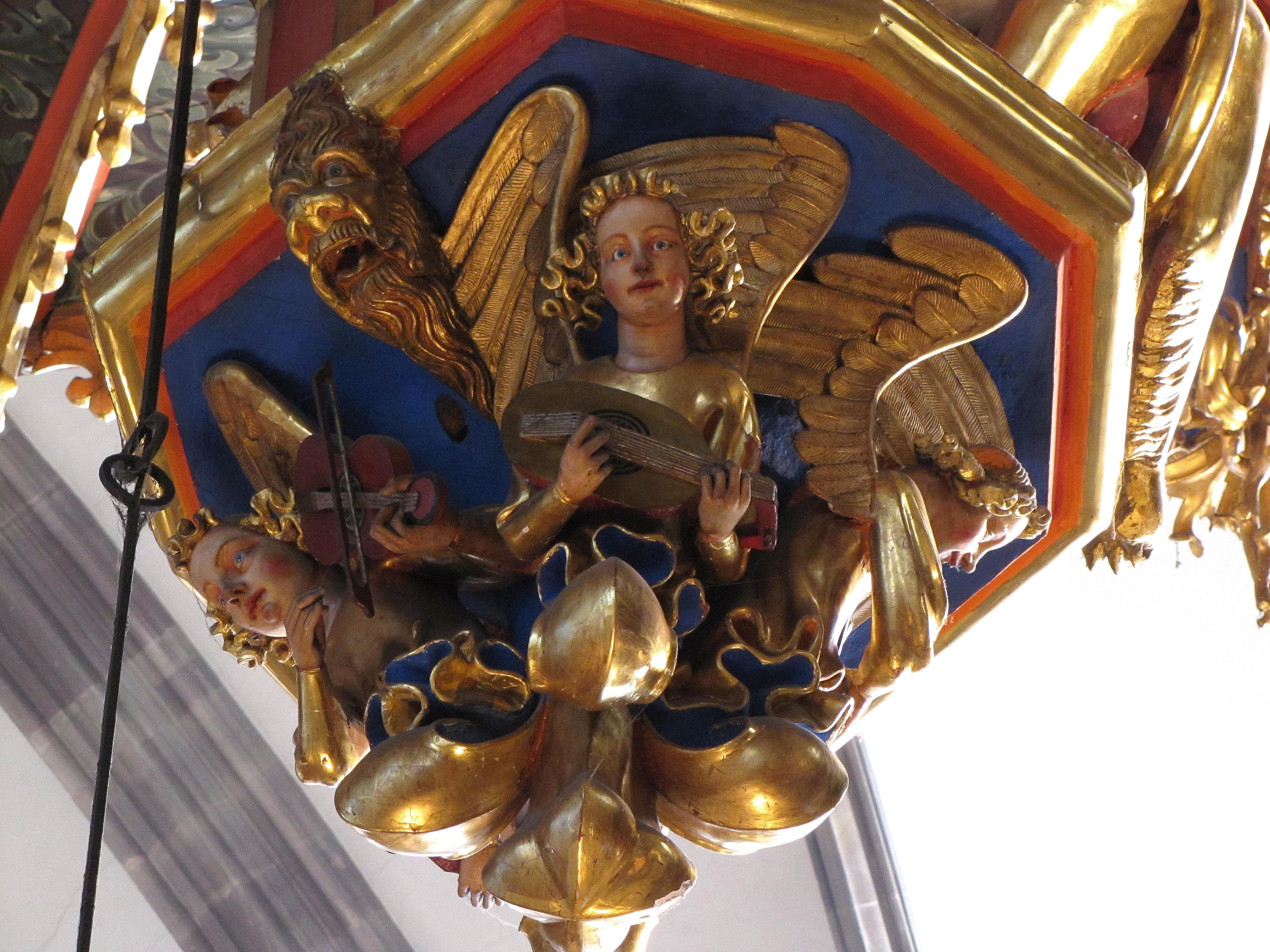
Musician angel decorating the organ

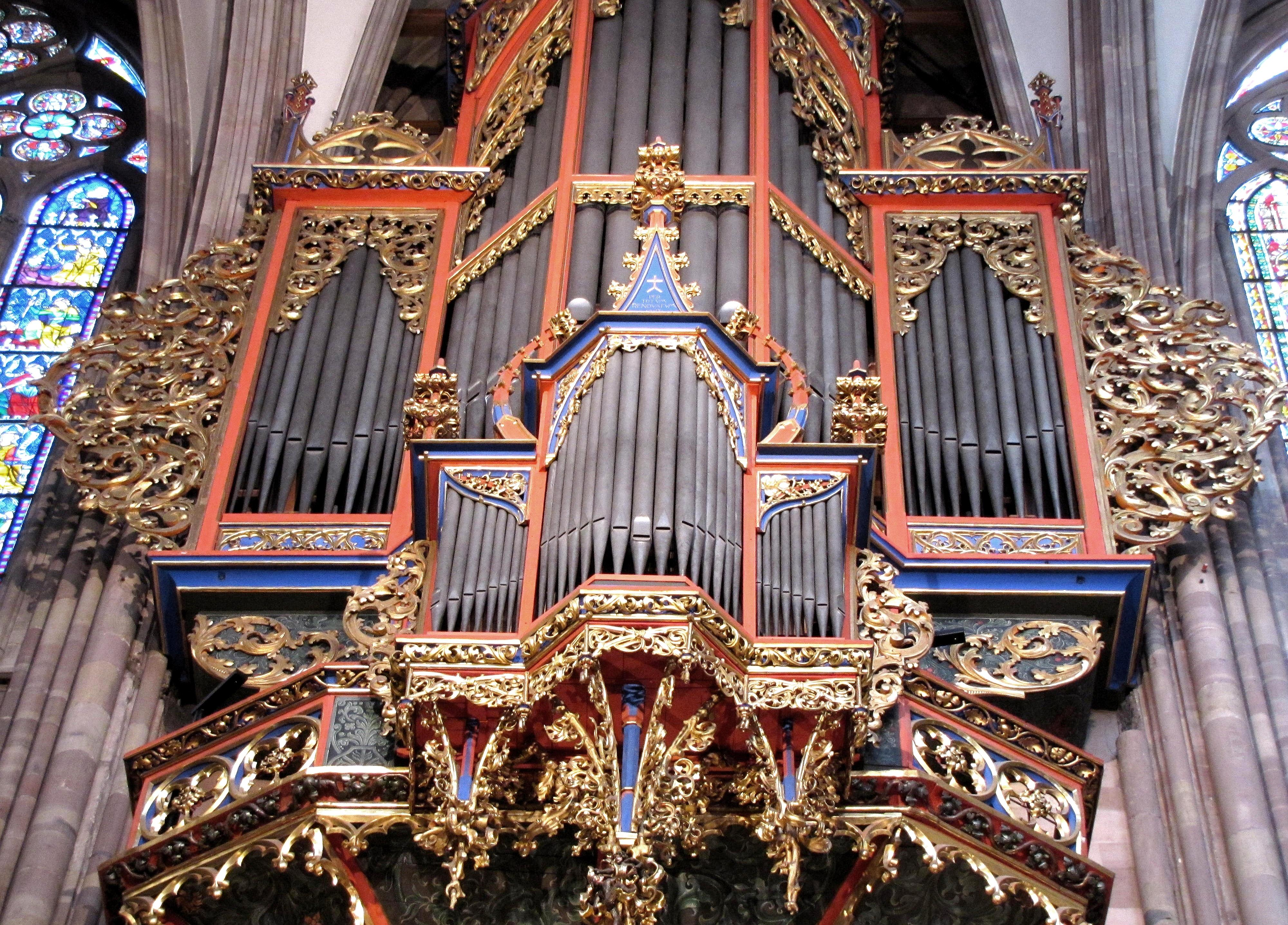
The buffet of the organ

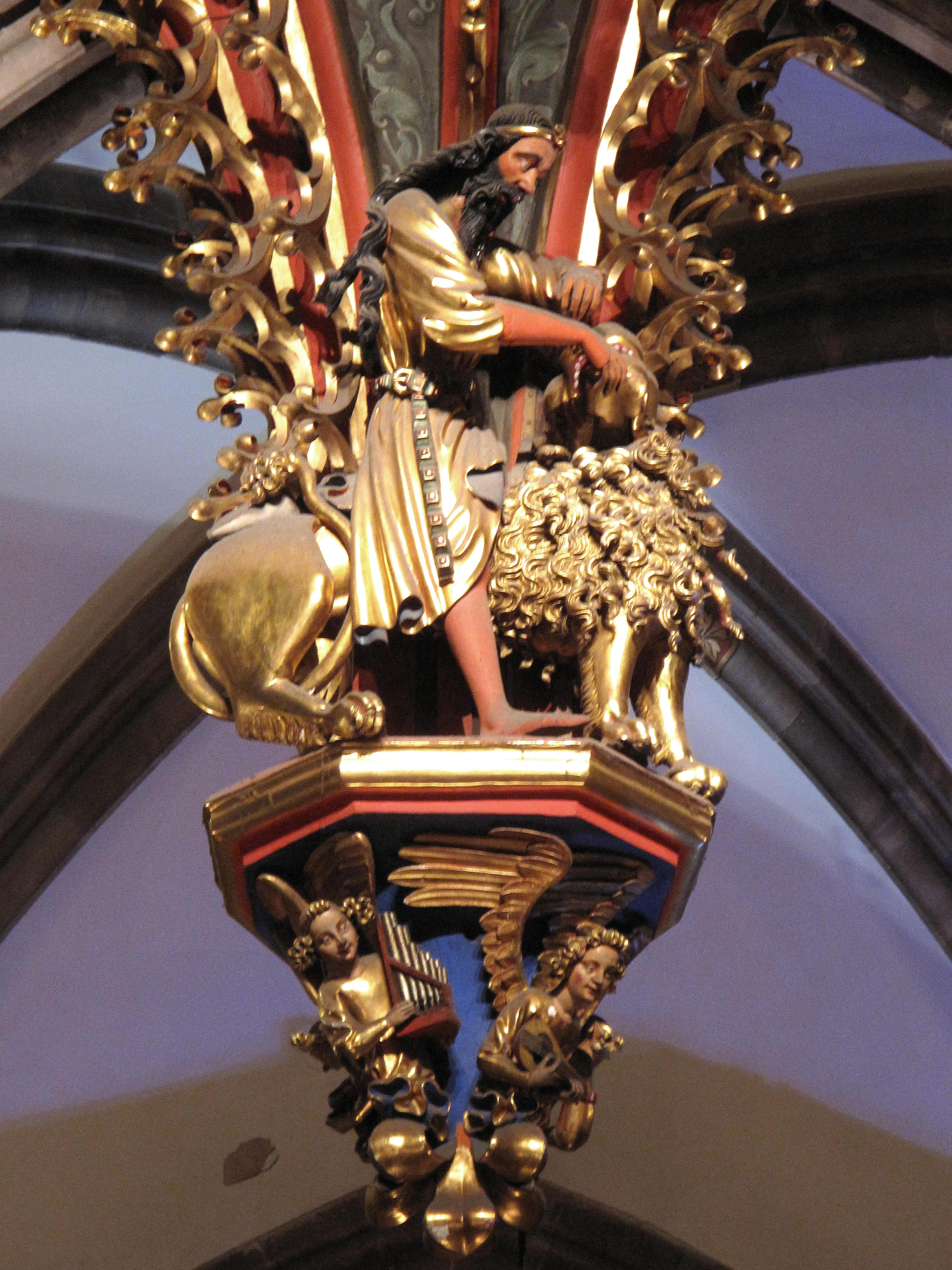
Animated mechanical figure of Samson and a lion

The grand organ, located high on the wall of the north side of the nave, is recorded as existing in 1260. It was rebuilt 1298, in 1324–1327, in 1384, 1430, and 1489 and finally in 1716 by André Silbermann. It was hoisted up to its present position in 1327. The ornate and colourful decoration of pinnacle, spires, and sculpture Sculpture also hangs beneath the organ, including a moving figure of Samson opening the jaws of a lion. Other moving figures include a trumpet player carrying a banner and a pretzel vendor being offered flour, water, and salt by the caryatides on the console.

The Silbermann organ had three keyboards, thirty-nine jeux, or effects and two thousand, two hundred forty-two pipes. It was electrified after 1807, and was restored and modified several times, most recently in 1934–35 and in 1975–81, giving it the current forty-seven jeux.

The current organists of Strasbourg Cathedral are Pascal Reber, Damien Simon, Guillaume Nussbaum, Arthur Skoric and Benoît Clavier.

In addition to the grand organ in nave, the cathedral has two smaller organs:

- Choir pipe organ, north side of the choir, Joseph Merklin, 1878
- Crypt pipe organ, 1998

=== North transept ===
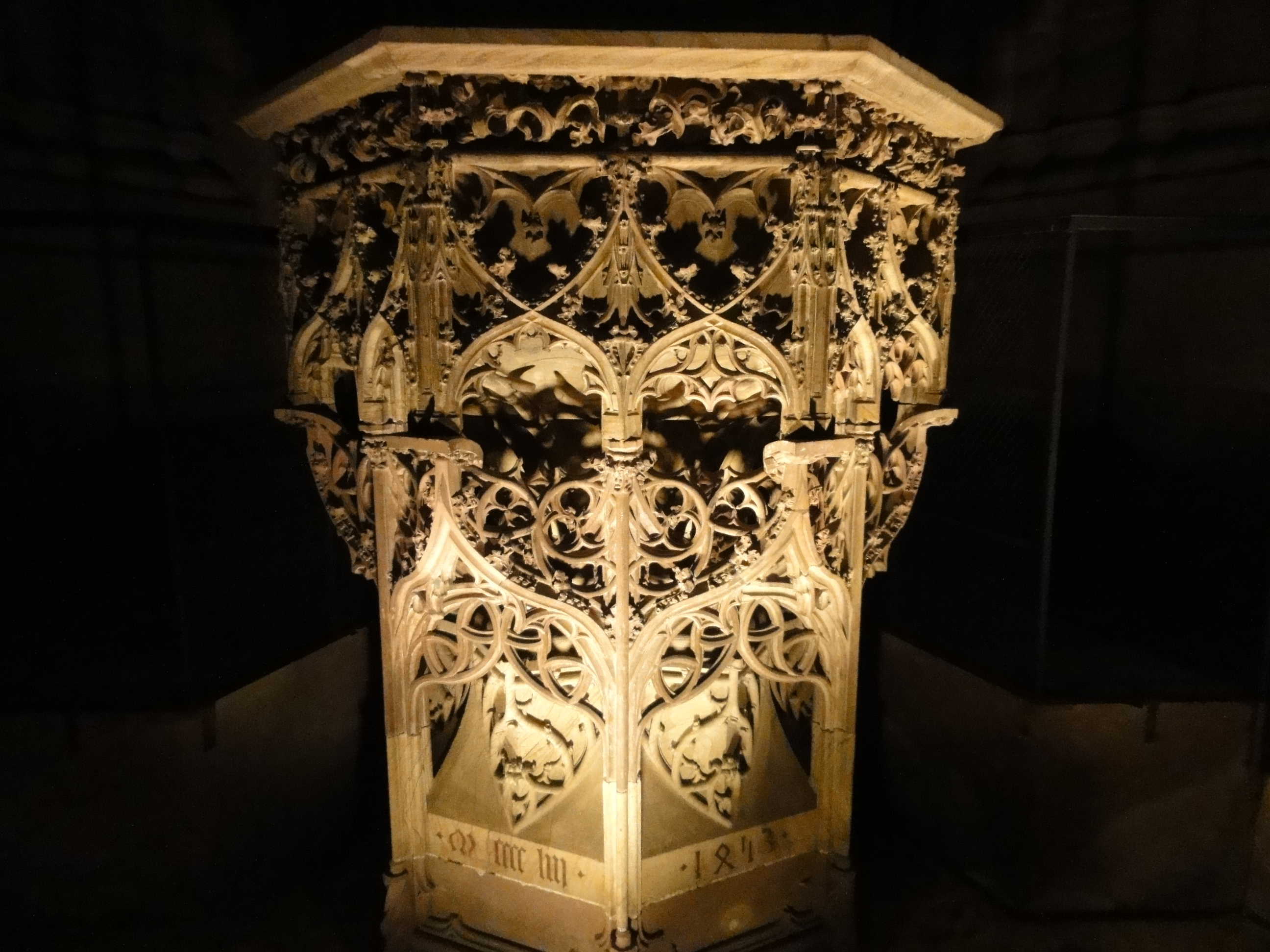
The baptismal font by Jost Dotzinger (1453)

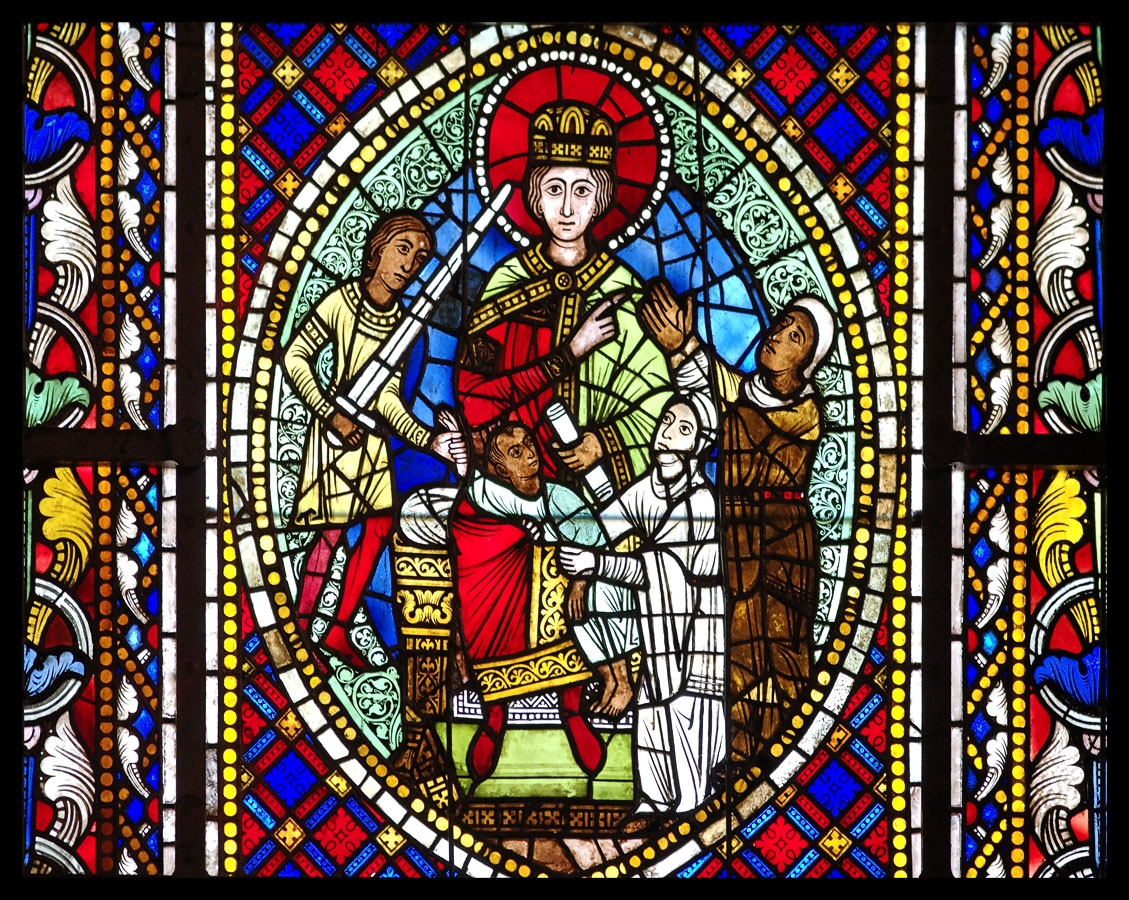
Judgement of Solomon window in north transept (late 12th c.)

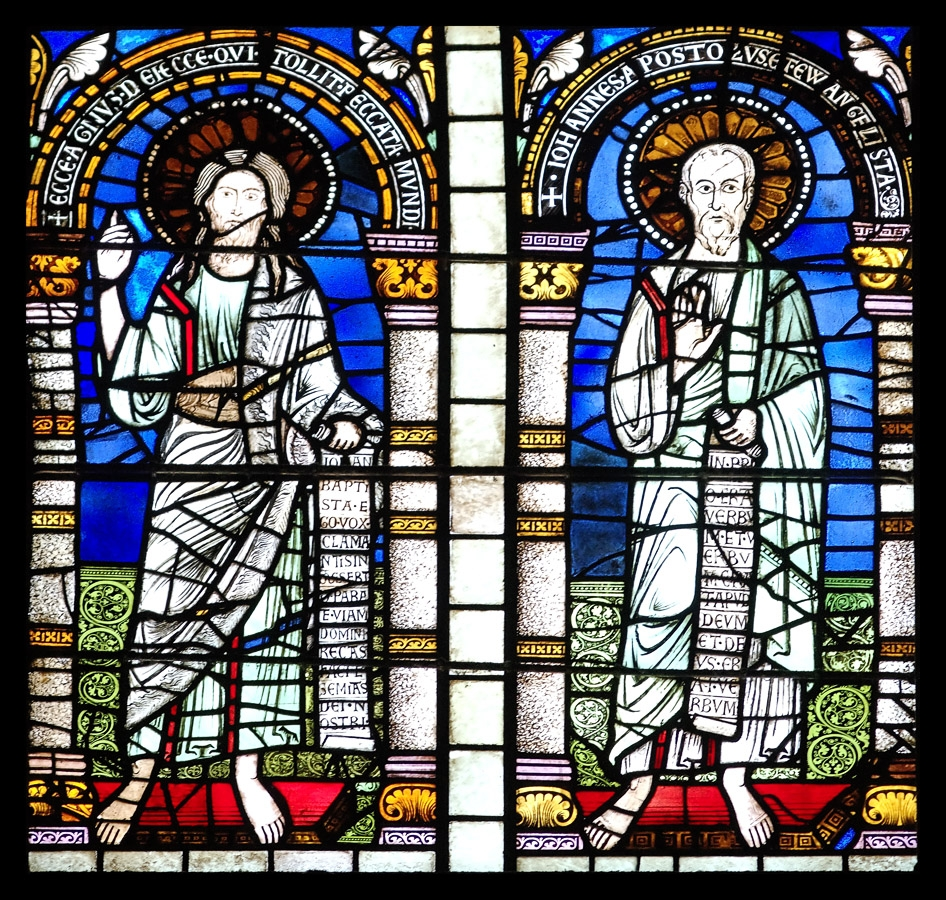
Saint John the Baptist and Saint John the Evangelist (3rd quarter of 12th century), left window of north transept

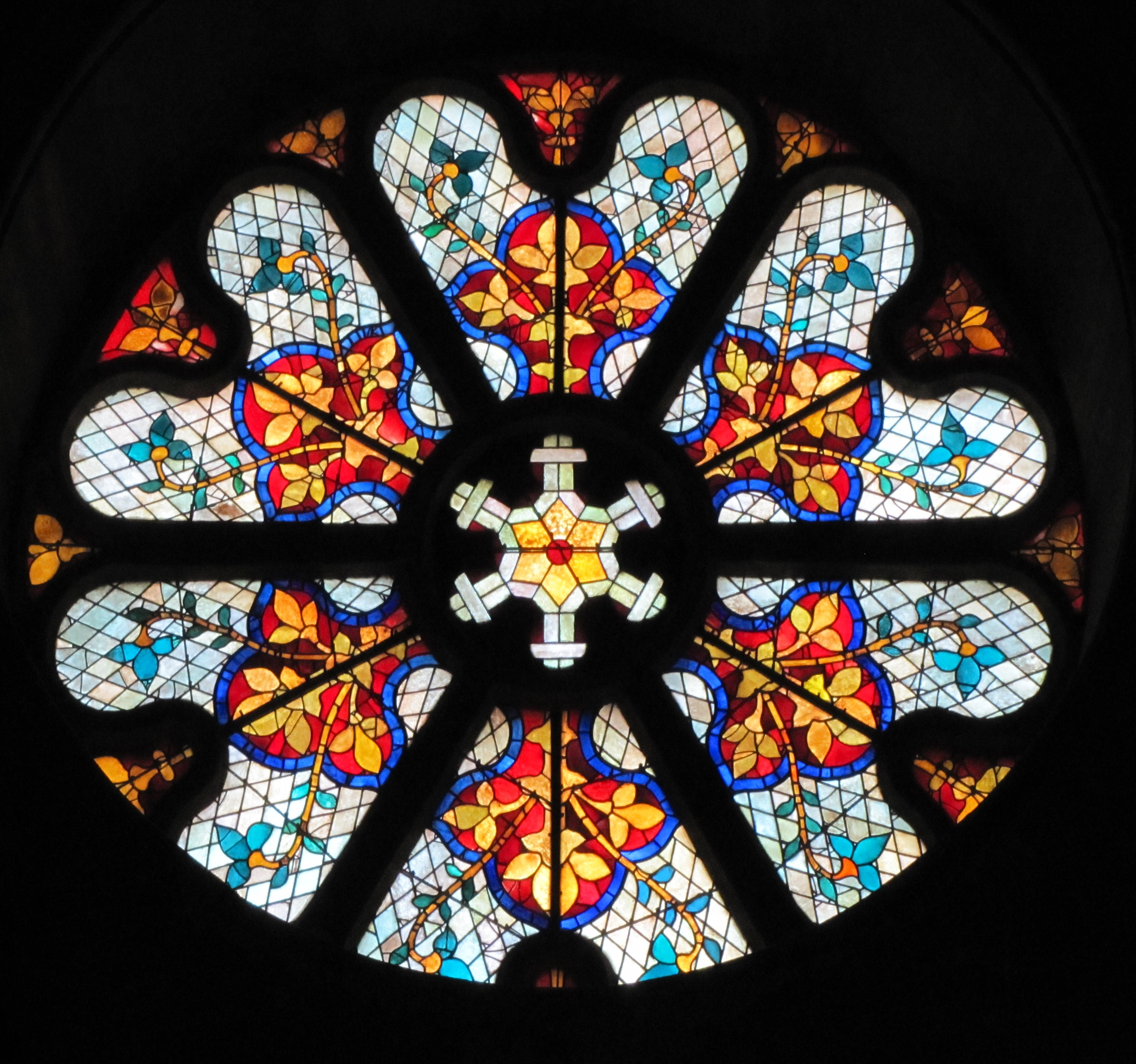
North transept rose window

The transept and the apse were built atop the Romanesque crypt, making them a little higher than the nave; they are reached by a short stairway, giving the impression that the choir and apse are the stage of a theater. The crossing of the transept and the choir is topped by the central cupola or dome, which is supported by four gigantic pillars, each wrapped in eight columns, which reach up to support the vaults under the cupola. The cupola itself rests upon four squinches, a base made of rounded arches, which make the connection between the Gothic and Romanesque elements. The columns are lavishly decorated with sculpted foliage.

Formerly the floor of the crossing was filled with tombs of notable religious figures, but they were moved in later reconstructions. Only the names remain carved on the walls. There are two altars fixed to west pillars of the crossing, both from the 16th century; one devoted to Saint Pancras of Rome and the other to Saint Maurice. The crossing is filled with statues and busts of saints set into niches as well as bas-reliefs of the Nativity and the Adoration of the Magi. Other scenes are painted onto the reverse of the bas-reliefs.

The first overhead vault before the cupola features a 19th-century painting of the Last Judgement by Charles Auguste Steinheil, a collaborator of Eugène Viollet-le-Duc and other notable cathedral-restorers. It is in a Neo-Byzantine style, with Christ in a red frame in the center. The other vaults in the crossing were also intended to be painted, but funding was insufficient.

The Romanesque north transept has four traverses, which were the first in the cathedral to receive Gothic rib vaults. The vaults are supported by a circular pillar with modest decorative stone rings. The two lower lancet windows were put together in the 19th century out of glass from different centuries. They feature a Tree of Jesse (The Genealogy of Christ) and the judgement of Solomon (right window) and the Virgin Mary with John the Baptist and John the Evangelist) as well as King Solomon, the Queen of Sheba and King David on the left. The two rose windows above are later, from the 14th century, with vegetal designs. On the east wall, the windows depict Christ in Majesty, Saint Lawrence, a Virgin and Child, and John the Baptist. The capitals of the columns are decorated with dragons and other mythical creatures.

The north transept also contains the two baptismal fonts, one circular and one heptagonal, in their own architectural settings, They were made by Jost Dotzinger in 1453. The octagonal vault is covered with arches and lacelike interlaced sculpture in the late Gothic Flamboyant style.

The north transept connects with the Chapel of Saint John, entered through a pointed Gothic arch containing a rounded Romanesque arch. The central art work of the North Transept is a large statue of Christ on the cross, over a sculptural landscape depicting the Mount of Olives, crowded with carved figures in dramatic poses. It was originally made in 1498 by Nicolas Roder for the cemetery of Saint-Thomas, and was based on engravings by Martin Schongauer and Albrecht Dürer.

=== South transept ===
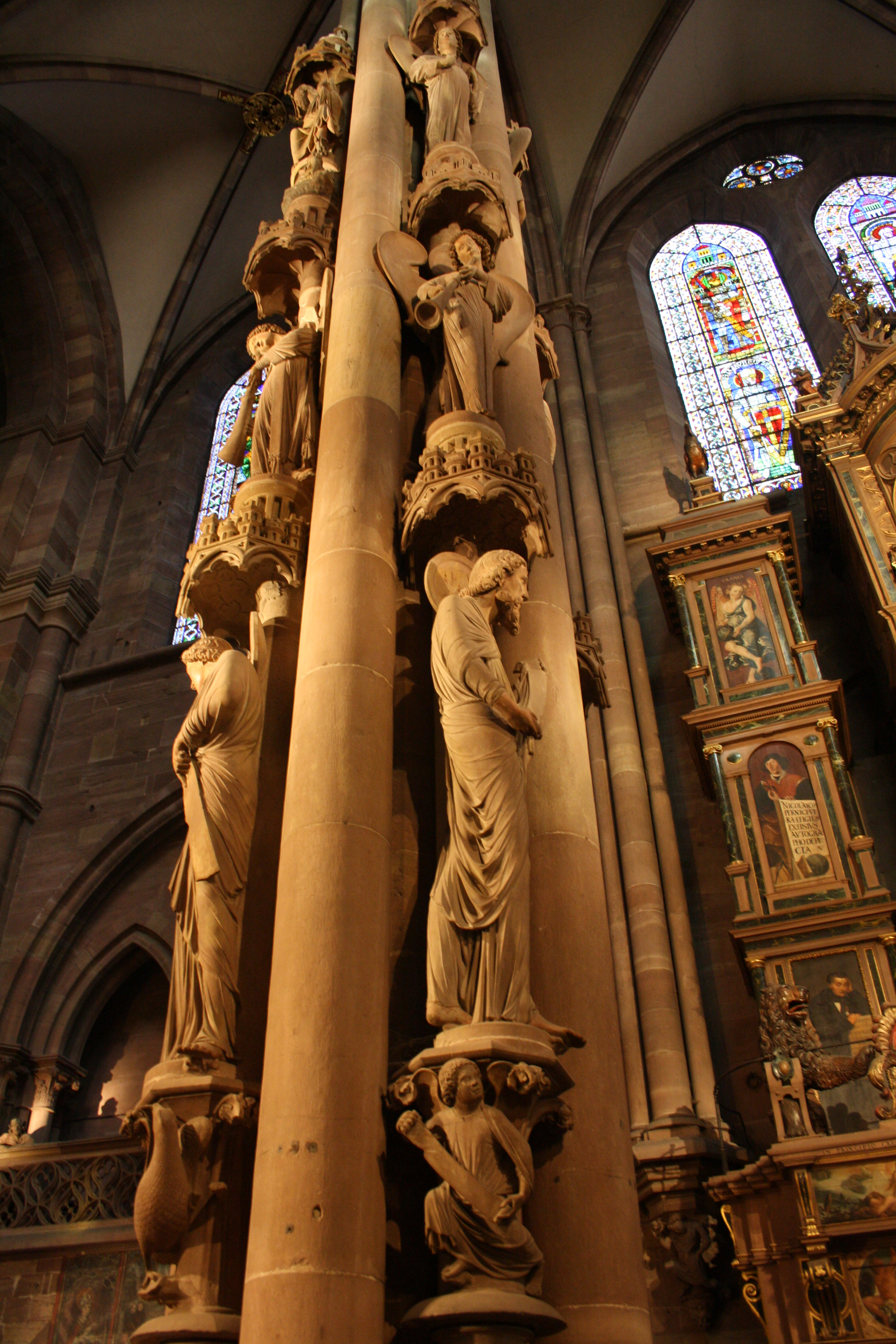
Pillar of the angels

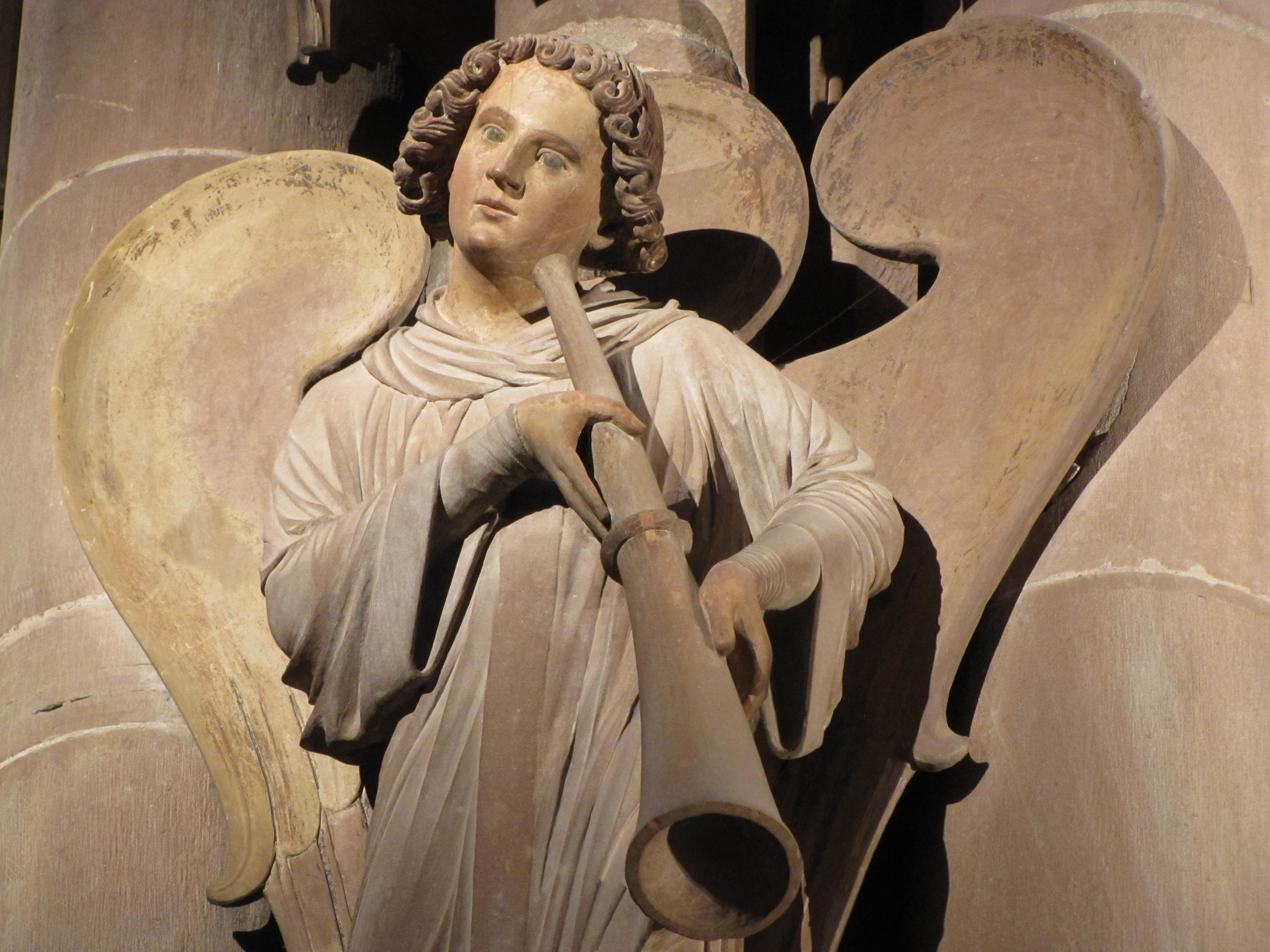
Angel with a trumpet

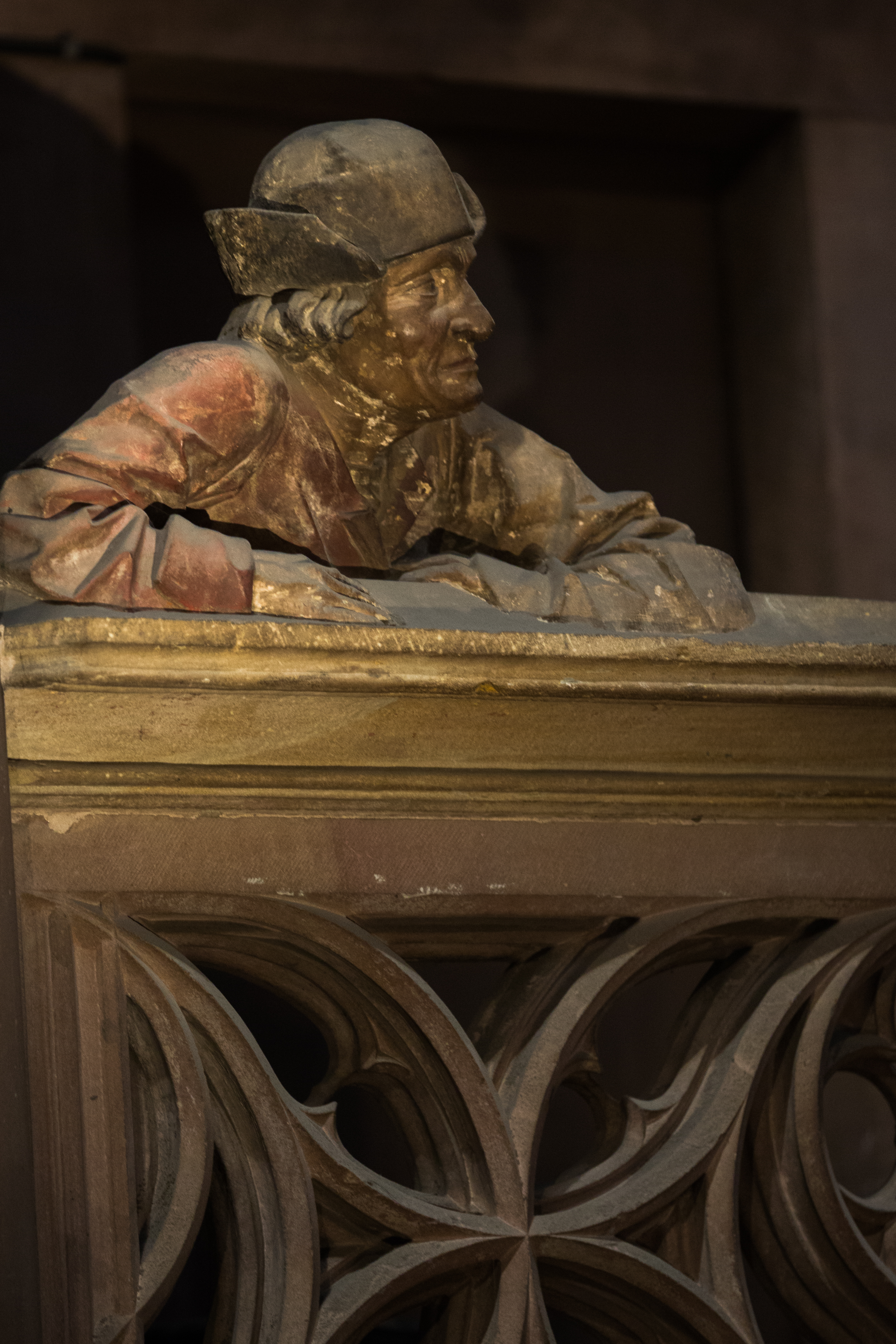
The man on the balustrade (south transept)

In the south transept, the lancet and oculus windows in the two large bays on the east, built in 1220–1227, are modelled after those in the lower choir of Chartres Cathedral. A pointed arch, a tribune for singers, and a balustrade were added in the 15th century. A sculpture of a head, wearing the hat of an architect or magistrate, gazes from the balustrade at the pillar of angels. Under the balustrade is a large painting on wood illustrating the Nativity, in a sweeping landscape. It also dates from the 15th century.

The South Transept contains the Pillar of Angels, a massive supporting pillar for the ceiling. It is composed of an octagonal pillar surrounded by four engaged columns, which reach upwards to support the vaults, and four slender colonettes. It is decorated with four vertical groups of statue-columns, depicting scenes from Christ and the Last Judgement, as well as four angels carrying the instruments of the Passion, and above that, four more angels sounding trumpets. At the lower level are statues of the four Evangelists. The pillar was created in the middle of the 13th century, most probably by a group of sculptors from France or Burgundy. Other parts of the vaults are upheld by Atlantes, supports in the form of human figures.

The rose windows of the west transept facade were made between 1230 and 1235, Above the rose are smaller round oculi from the same period, depicting Biblical symbols; the Alpha and Omega, the Candelabra of the Ancient Alliance, and others which combine floral and geometric designs.

=== Astronomical clock ===
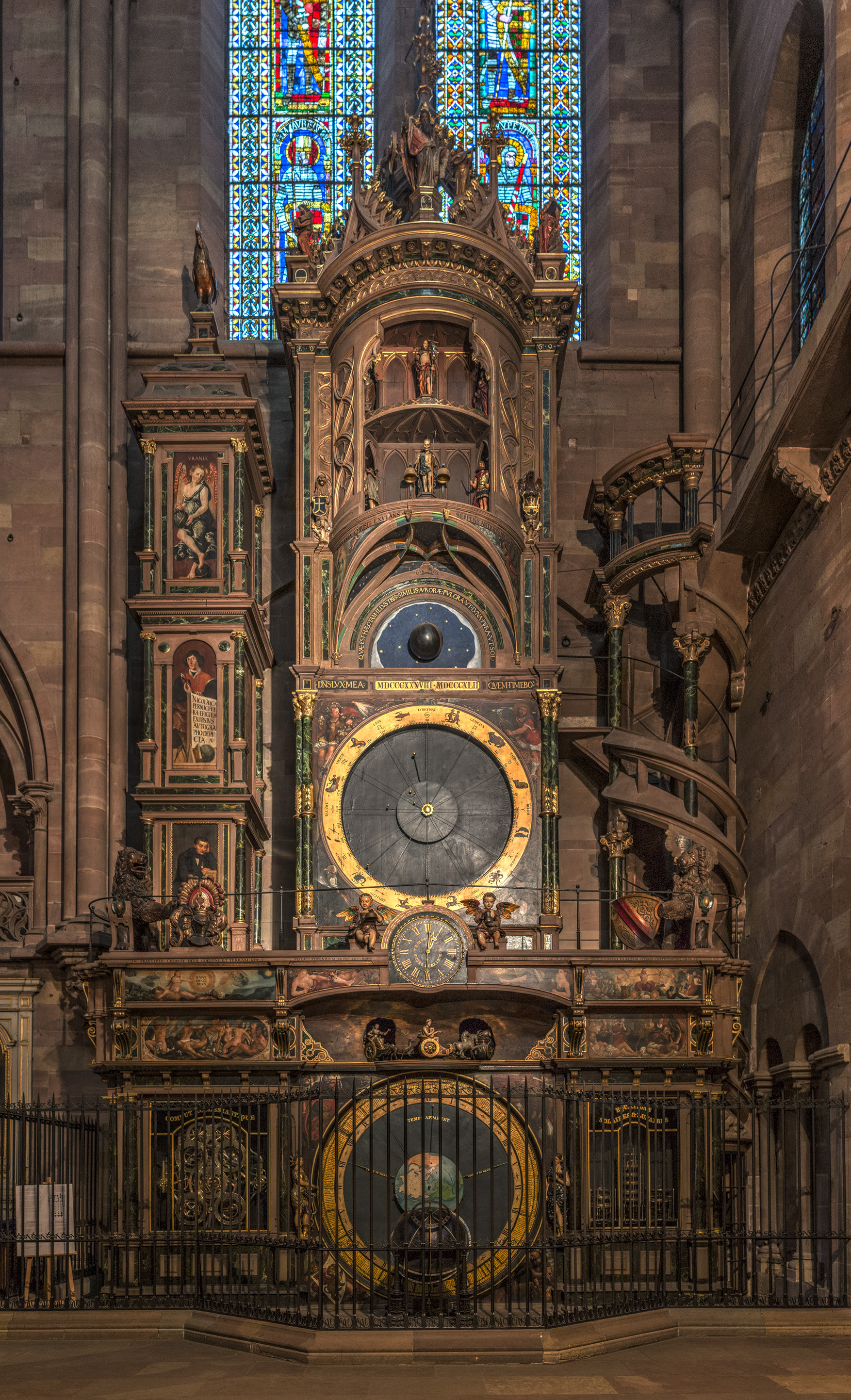
The Astronomical Clock

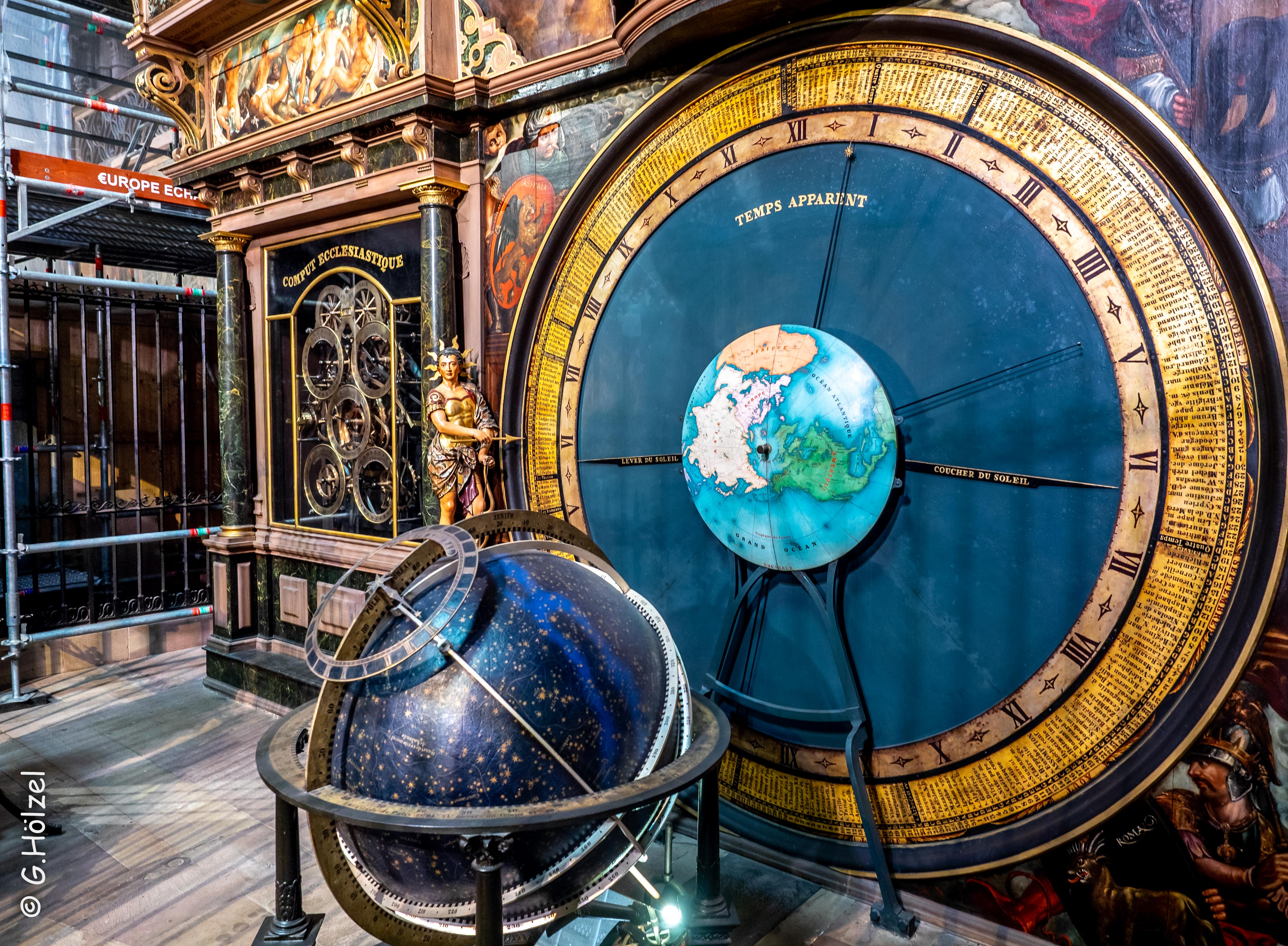
Multiple faces of the clock -stars and hours

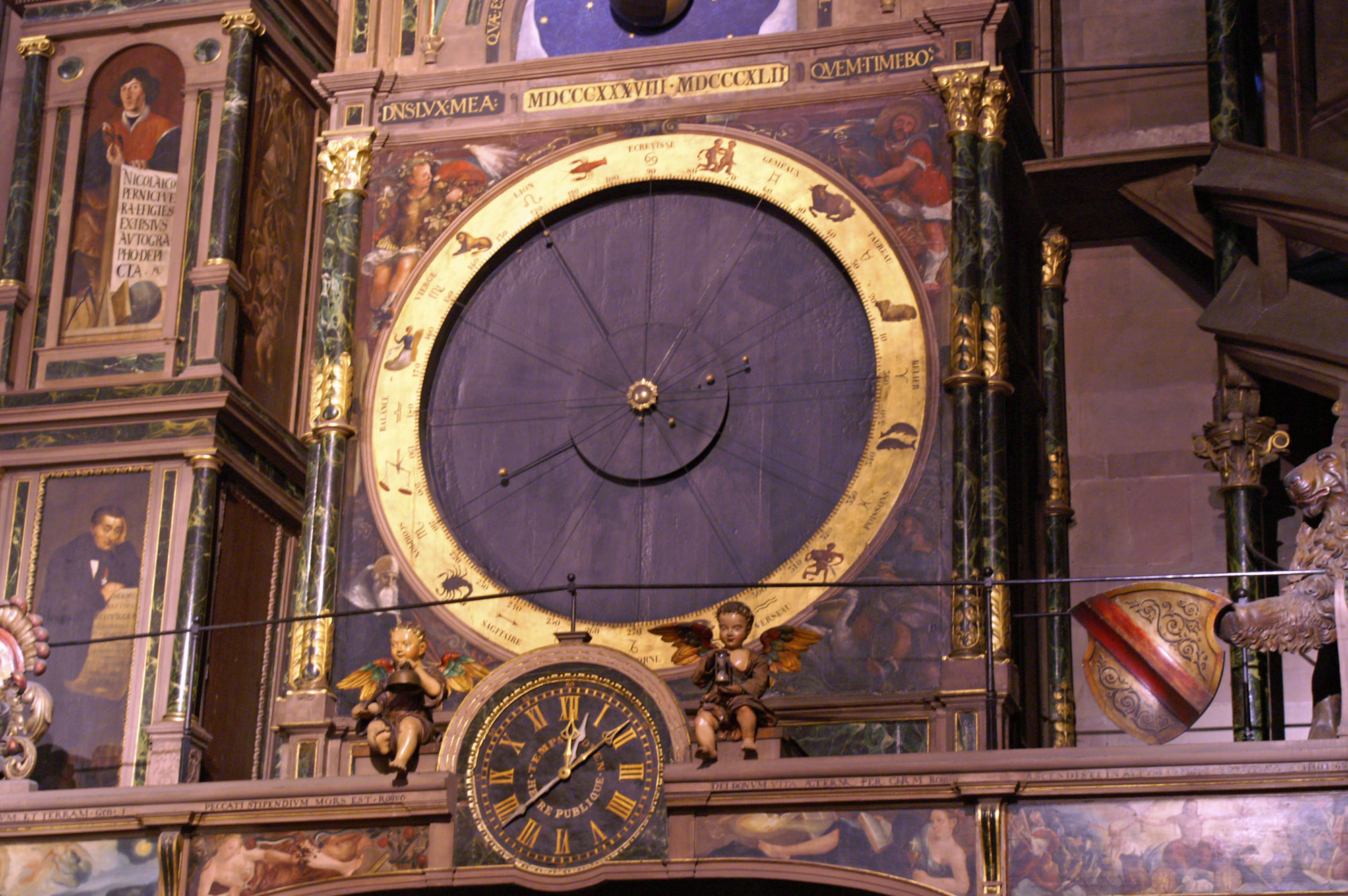
One face of the clock -signs of the zodiac

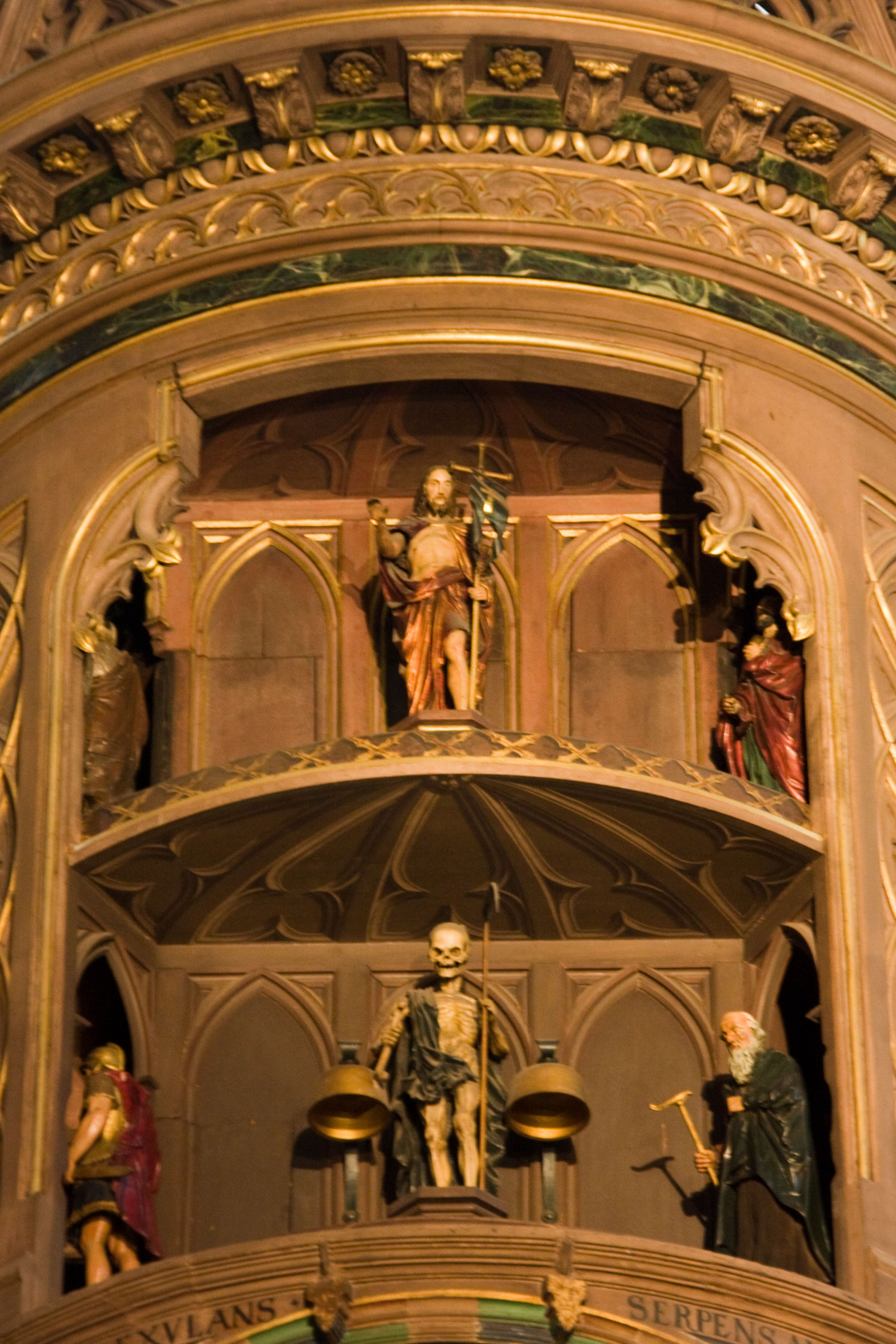
Moving figures of the clock

The astronomical clock, located in the south transept, is one of the most famous features of the cathedral. The first astronomical clock was installed in the cathedral from 1352–54 until 1500. It was called the Dreikönigsuhr ("three-king clock"), and was located at the opposite wall from where today's clock is. At noon, a group of three mechanical kings would prostrate themselves before the infant Jesus, while the chimes of the clock sounded the hour.

In 1547 a new clock was begun by Christian Herlin and others, but the construction was interrupted when the cathedral was handed over to the Roman Catholic Church. Construction was resumed in 1571 by Conrad Dasypodius and the Habrecht brothers, and this clock was given a more ambitious program of mechanical figures. It was decorated with paintings by the Swiss painter Tobias Stimmer. This clock functioned until 1788, and can be seen today in the Strasbourg Museum of Decorative Arts. The present clock was built by Jean-Baptiste Schwilgué between 1837 and 1842.

All the parts of the clock together are 18 m (59 ft) high. The clock shows much more than the official time; it also indicates solar time, the day of the week (each represented by a god of mythology), the month, the year, the sign of the zodiac, the phase of the moon and the position of several planets. The lower part of the massive base of the clock has statues of Apollo and the Goddess Diana presenting a circular calendar of the liturgical year, whose revolving face with a globe points to the dates of major religious festivals and events. This part of the clock is surrounded by painted figures representing the ancient empires – Greece, Assyria, Persia, and Rome.

The level above displays a group of mechanical chariots, with allegorical figures representing the days of the week, which move daily to bring to the front the current day of the week. Figures of two reclining women hold a cadran (clock face) between them which tells the minutes.

Above this level is a celestial globe in a sky of painted stars which makes a complete revolution every 23 hours, fifty-six minutes and four seconds. As it turns, it shows the 1,022 stars identified by Ptolemy, as viewed above the horizon of Strasbourg.

The central tower is composed of three levels. On the bottom, figures of the Four Seasons surround a mechanical astrolabe, which indicates the location of the planets according to Copernicus, and is surrounded by the signs of the zodiac. Above this is a globe, with painted figures of the Church and the Antichrist confronting each other. This mechanism displays the phases of the moon. Above this are two levels of animated mechanical figures, above that a figure of Christ and the four Evangelists, under a dome formed by crossed arches.

Animated characters launch into movement at different hours of the day. One angel sounds the bell while a second turns over an hourglass. Different characters, representing the ages of life (from a child to an old man) parade in front of Death. On the last level are the Apostles, passing in front of Christ. All these automata are put into operation daily at 12:30 pm except Sundays.

=== Apse ===
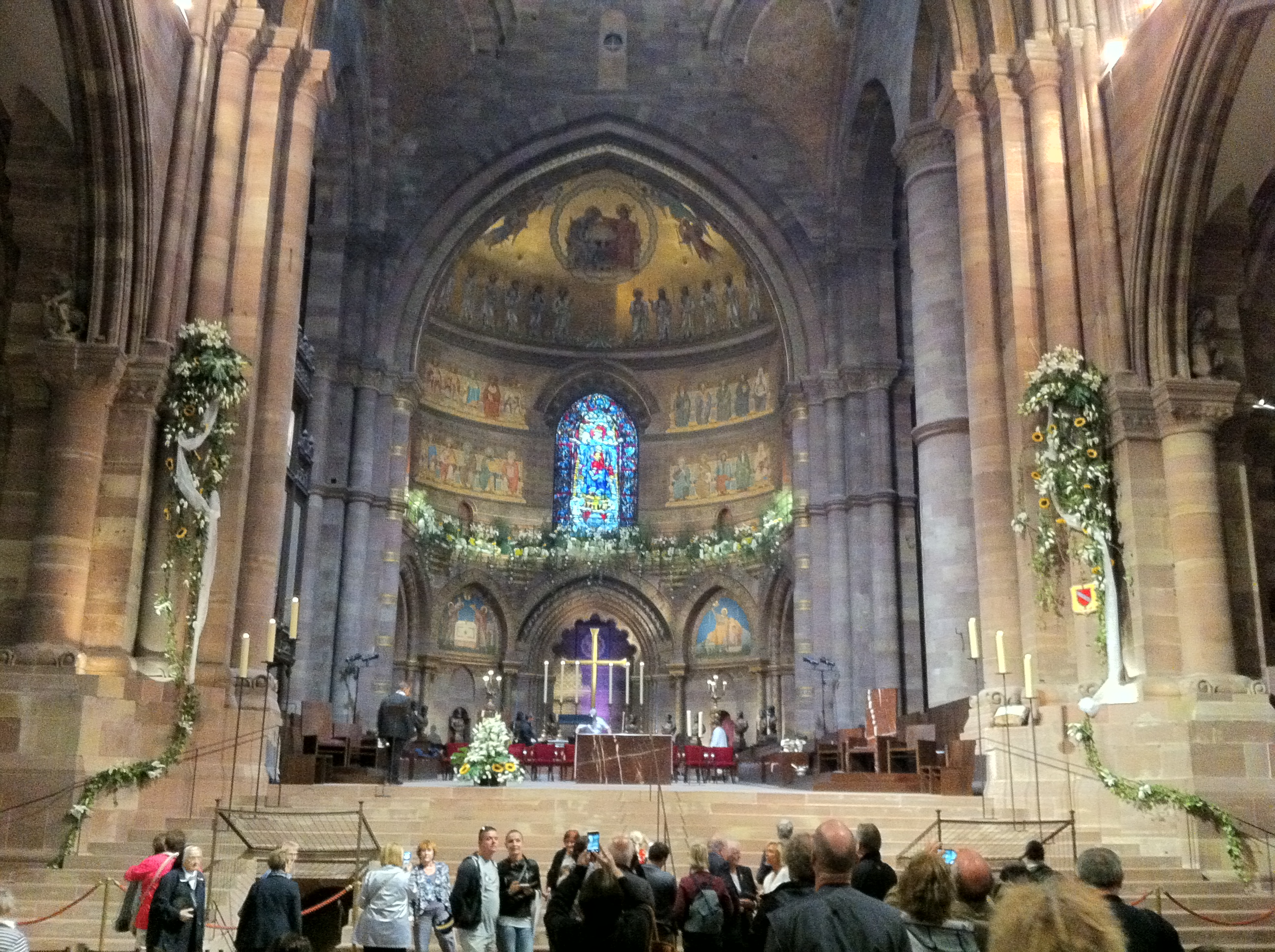
The choir and apse of the Cathedral

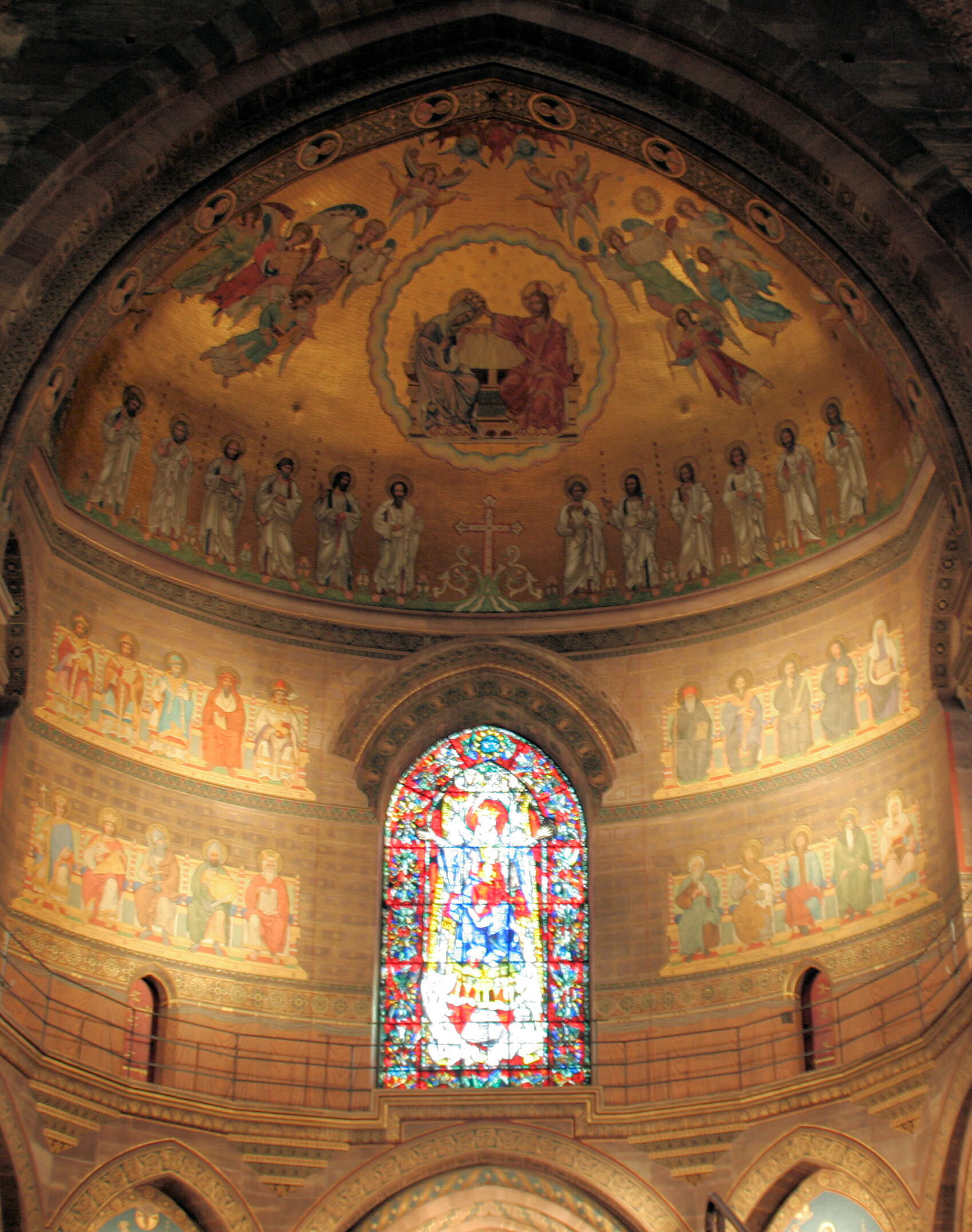
The apse, with the Virgin of Alsace window (1956)

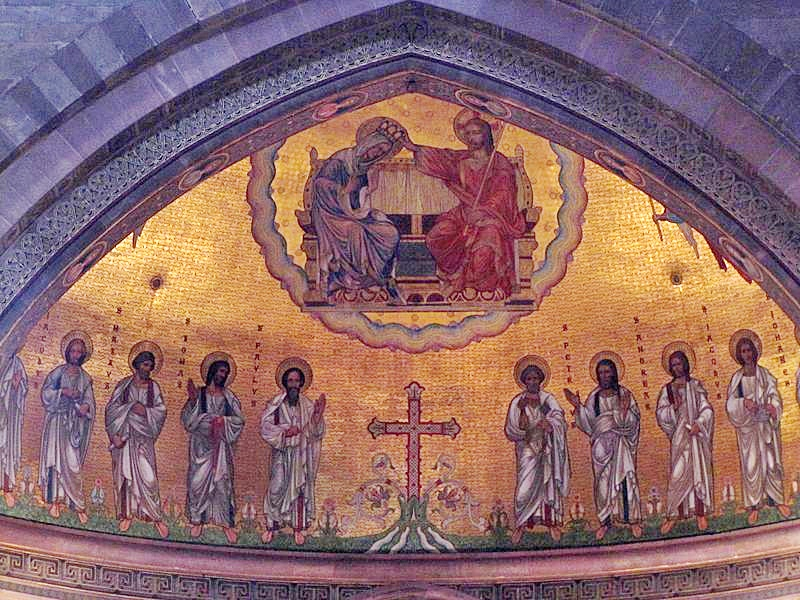
Crowning of Mary, by Eduard Steinle in the vault of the apse

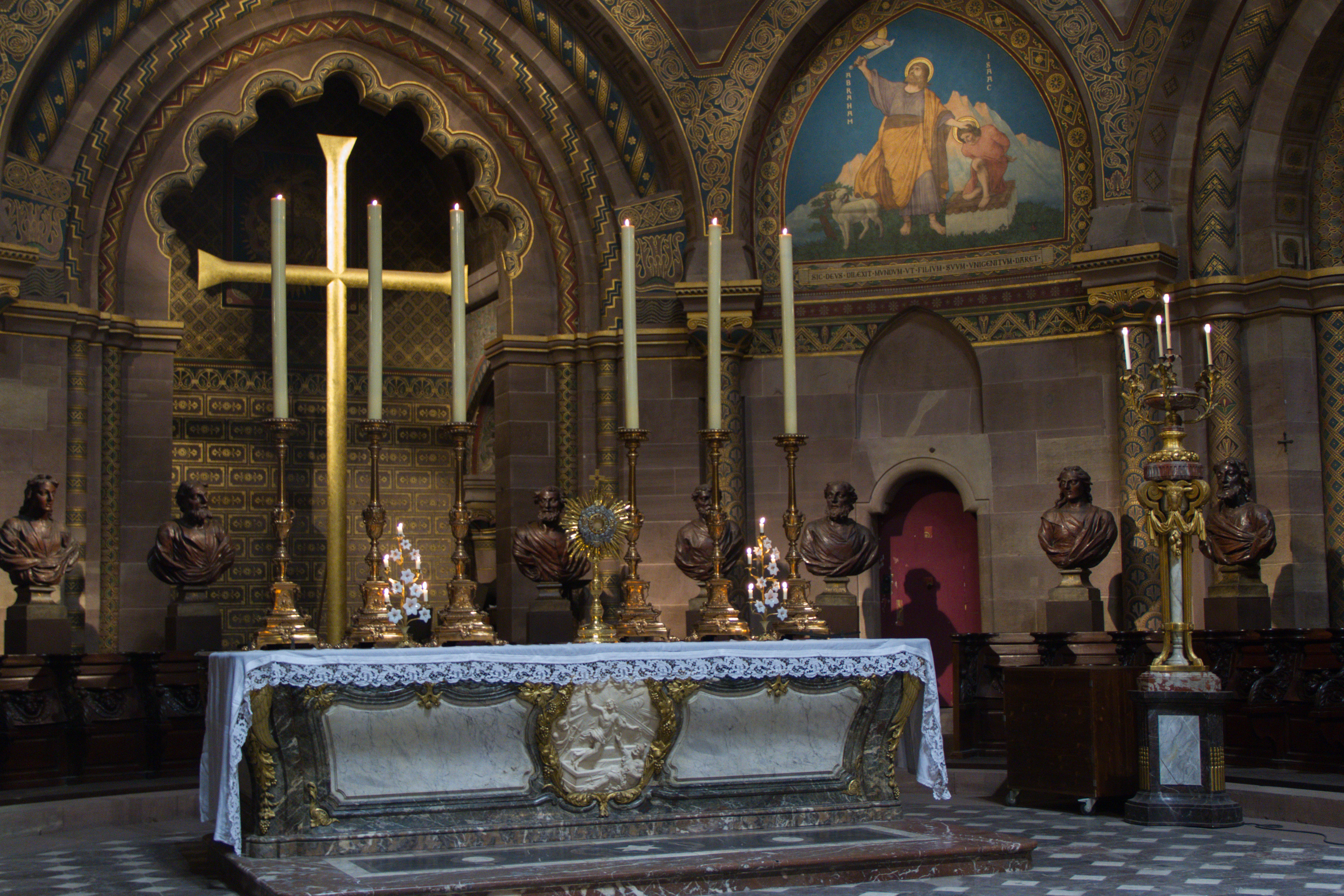
The main altar

The apse of the cathedral, the hemispherical vault behind the altar on the northeast end, features Romanesque and Gothic architecture overlaid with 19th-century Neo-Romanesque decoration, The paintings on the half-dome and walls were made by Édouard Steinlé in 1877–79, in the style of a Byzantine mosaic. The painted figures on the wall represent fathers of the church and founders of religious orders, depicted in Byzantine style.

In 2004 the apse and choir received some of its historic furnishings; fifteen choir stalls made by Claude Burdy and Claude Bergerat in 1692, as well as a group of busts of the apostles originally placed there in the 18th century.

The stained glass window in the axis of the apse depicts the Virgin of Alscace. The window was a gift to the Cathedral in 1956 from the Council of Europe, which has headquarters in Strasbourg. It replaces the original window which was one of the few windows not put into safe storage before World War II; it was destroyed by Allied bombing in 1944.

The main altar, in the form of a tomb, is a recreation of an earlier altar in the rocaille or late baroque style, which had been damaged in a fire in 1759 and then ruined during the French Revolution. The altar was recreated in 1809 by the architect Pierre-Valentin Boudhors, who discovered the old central medallion of the original altar and combined it with white and black marble panels. The sculptor Jacques Zimmer added the heads of cherubs made of bronze.

=== The Chapel of Saint Catherine ===
The chapel of St. Catherine is located in the southwest end of the cathedral, between the gift shop and the astronomical clock. Enter through a gate across from the chapel of Saint John the Baptist. It was constructed between 1830 and 1839 by Bishop Berthold the II. Within the chapel are many furnishings, including a sculpture of The Mother Mary cradling Christ, a contemporary stained glass window: the stained glass window of a hundred faces. The two vertical windows in the chapel of Sainte Catherine measure almost 9 m high by visual artist Véronique Ellena and master glassmaker Pierre-Alain Parot. Perhaps most curious to an unfamiliar visitor is the toe bone of Saint Alphonse-Marie Eppinger encased in a wooden and red velvet box, which was placed in the chapel upon her beatification in 2016.

=== Chapel of Saint John the Baptist ===
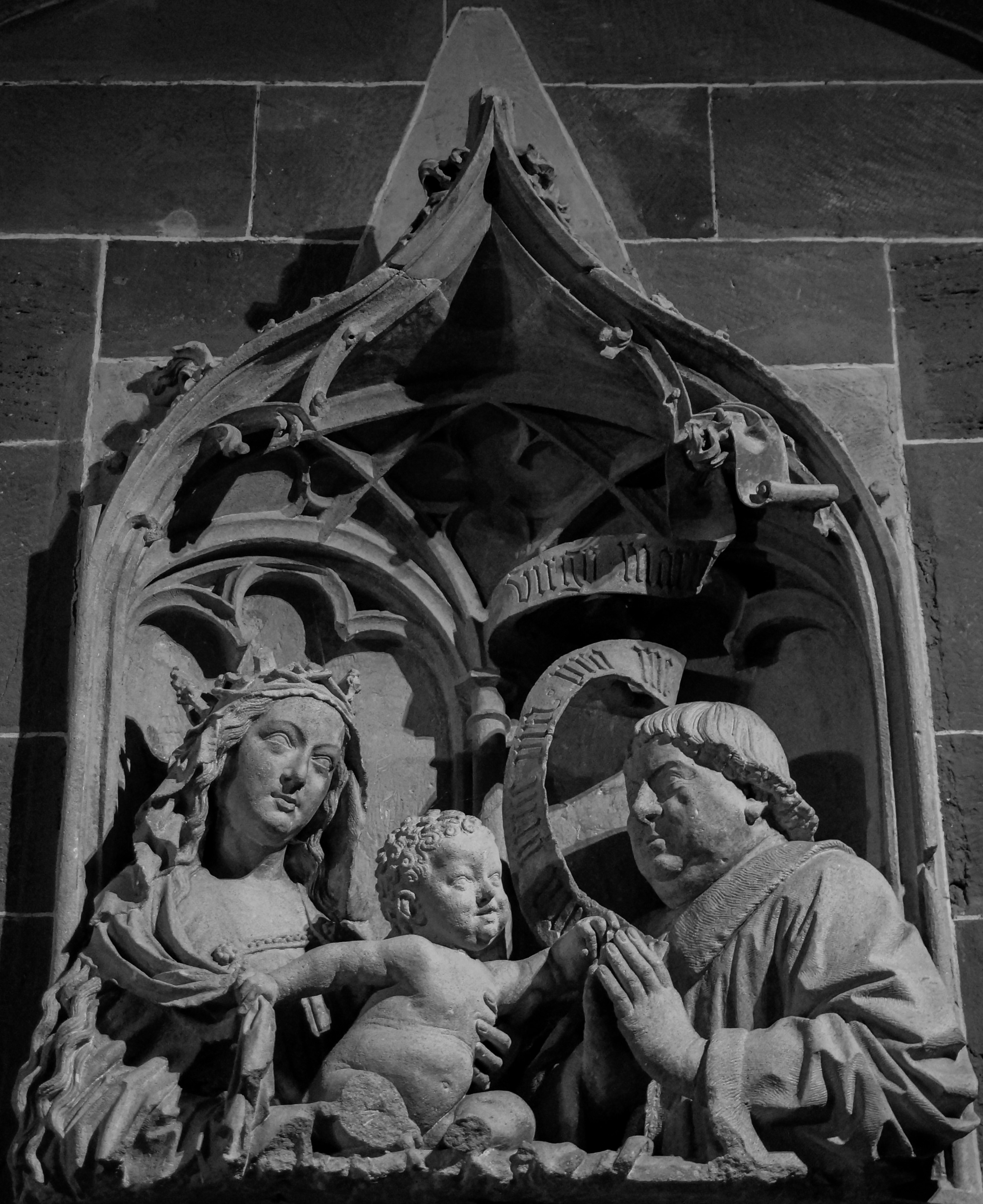
Canon Conrad de Bussnang praying to Virgin and Child. (15th c.)

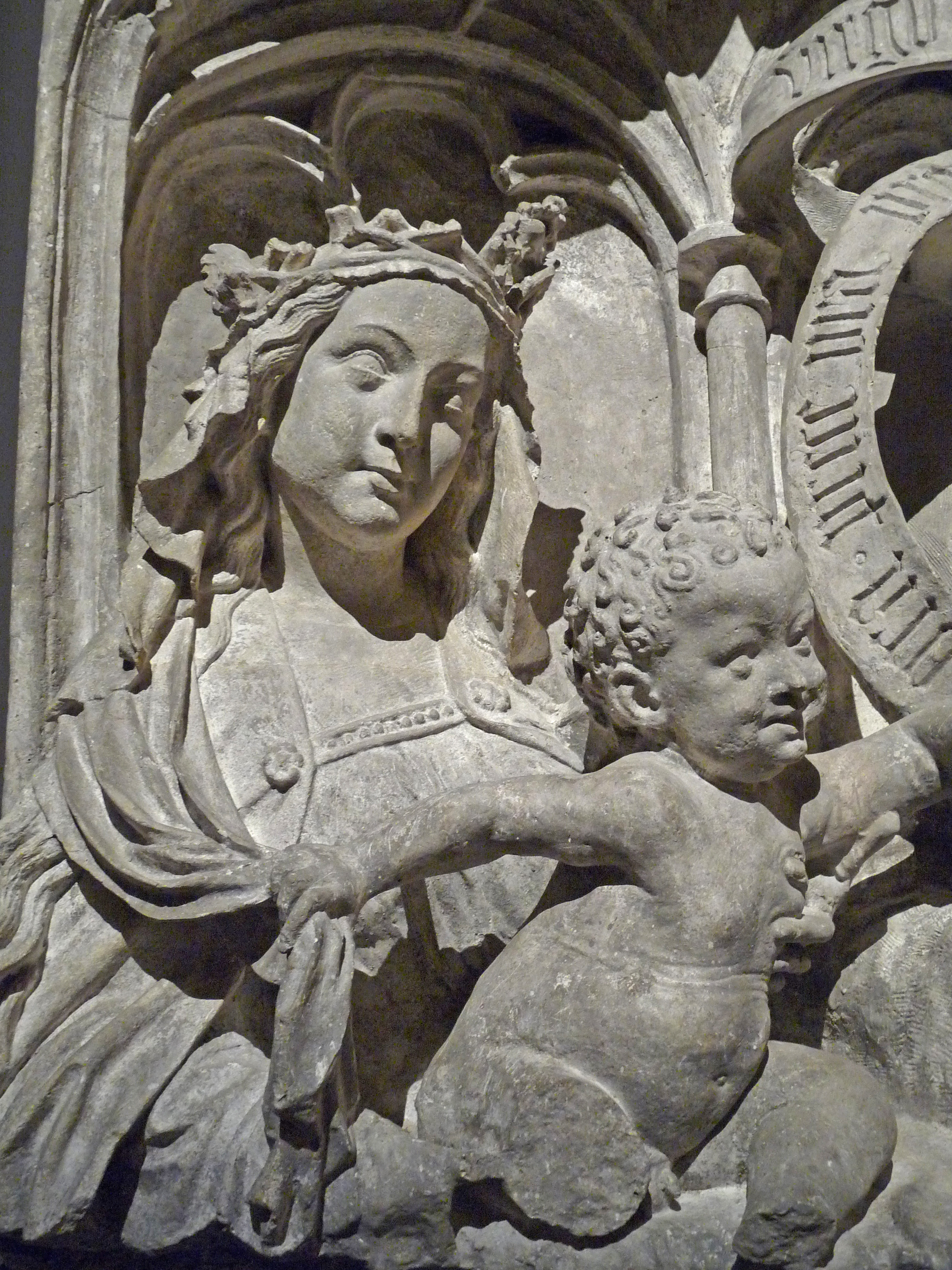
Detail of Virgin and Child

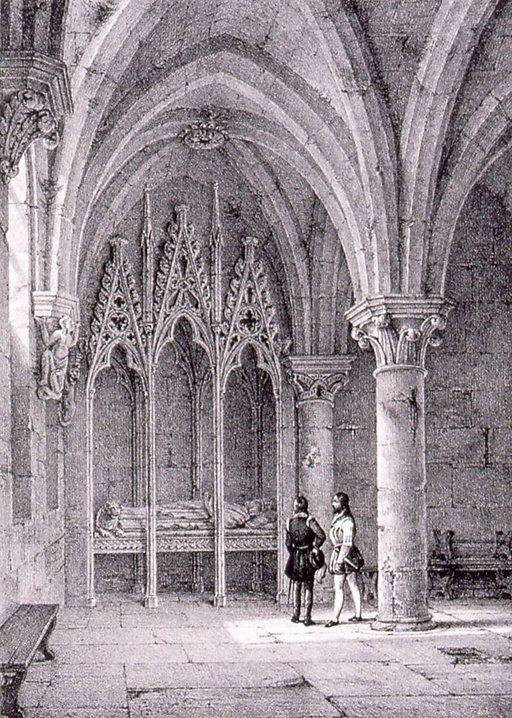
The chapel as it appeared in the 14th century (19th-century engraving)

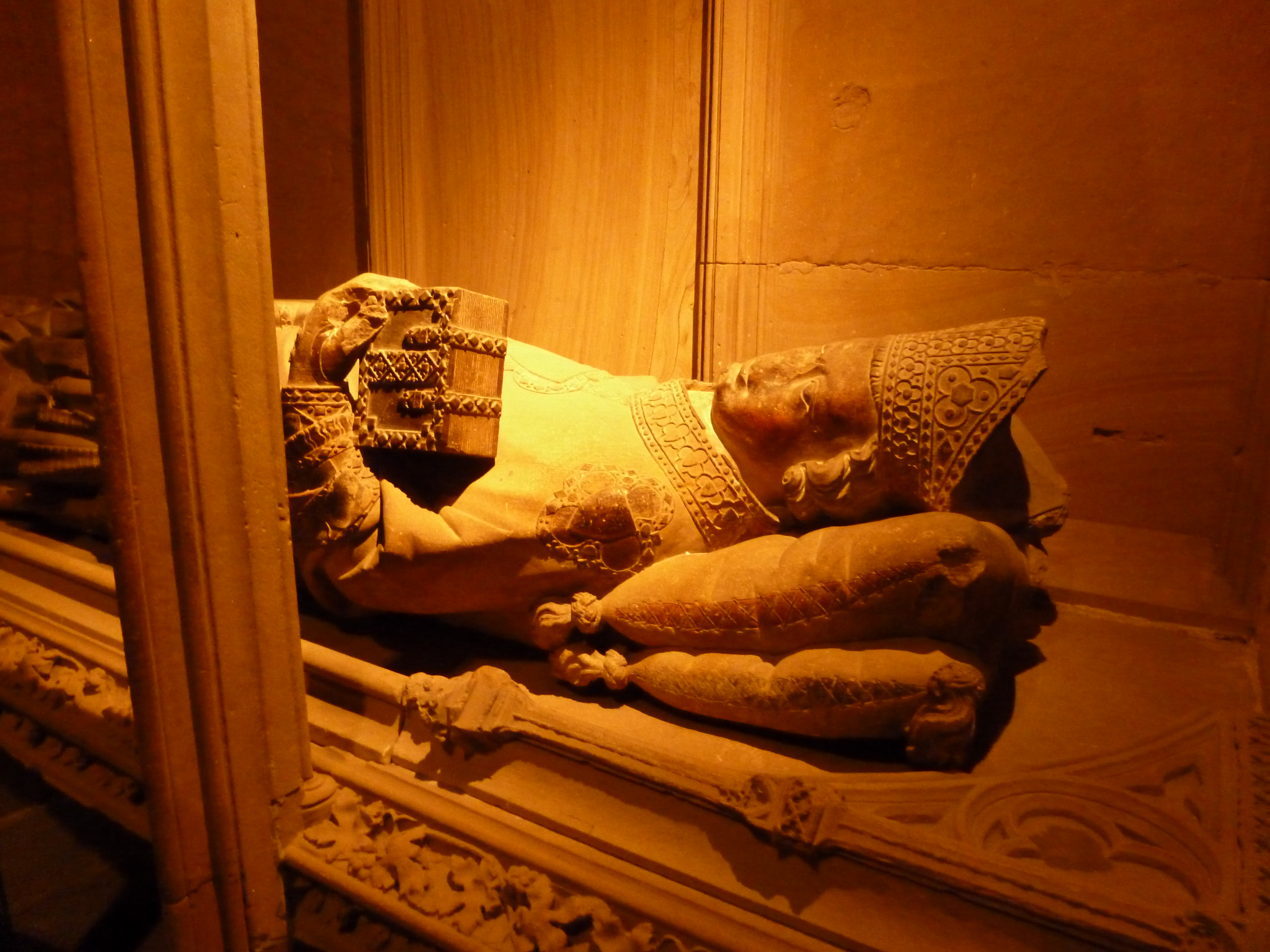
Tomb of Bishop Conrad de Lichtenberg (1310–20)

The Chapel of Saint John the Baptist is located just to the left of the apse, at the northeast end of the cathedral. It is one of the oldest parts of the cathedral, constructed in about 1170 and then rebuilt in Gothic style in 1230, with the same height as the adjoining nave. The sacristy occupies the upper level over the chapel. The chapel contains the tomb of Bishop Conrad de Lichtenberg, made between 1310 and 1320, and now framed by a flamboyant triple arch. It also contains the tomb of Conrad de Bussnang, a prominent member of the chapter, whose image is portrayed in sculpture praying before the Virgin and child. It dates to the end of the 15th century. A door opens from the chapel to an adjoining cloister behind the cathedral.

=== Chapel of Saint Andrew ===
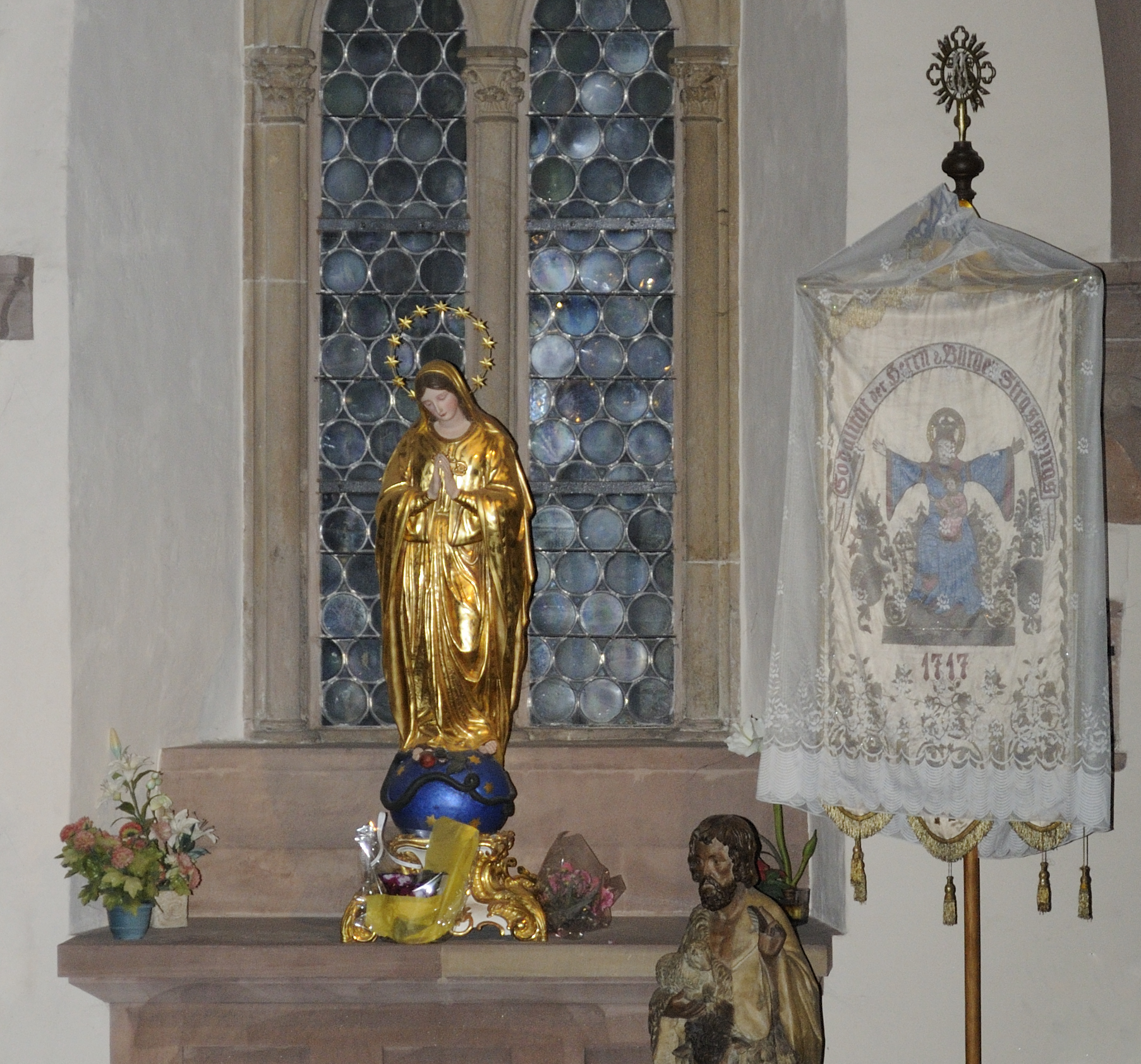
Statue of Virgin and a processional banner, in the Chapel of St. Andrew

The Chapel of Saint Andrew is on the southeast side, to the right of the apse. It is also a very early part of the cathedral, built shortly after 1150, with nine crossings and three naves of slightly different sizes, covered by Romanesque groin vaults. The chapel is devoted to memorials to six canons who were entombed there between 1478 and 1681. The central decoration is sculptural work dedicated to the Virgin Mary donated by the de Barby brothers in 1521. A Romanesque portal opens to the cloister outside.

=== Crypt ===
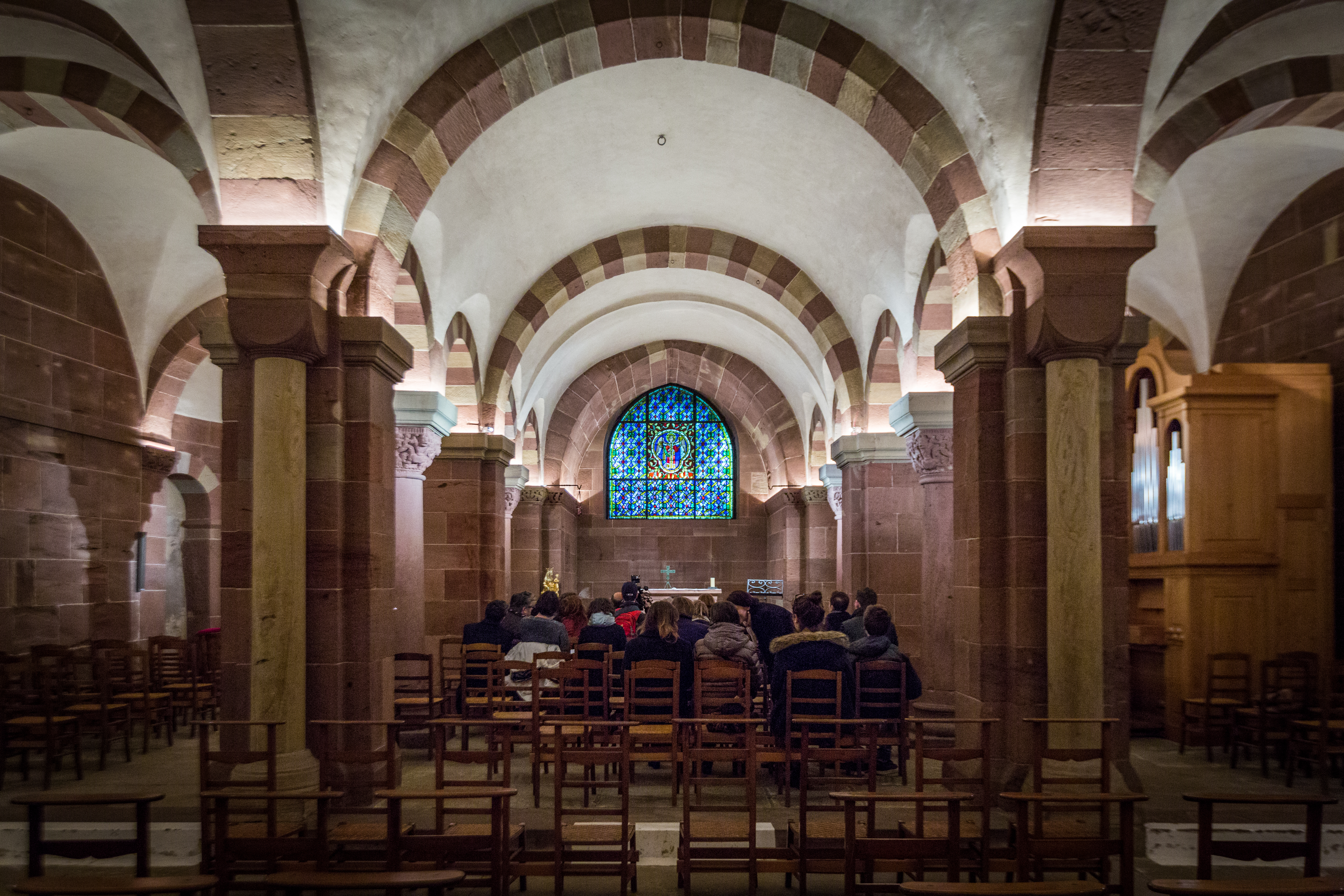
The larger crypt (12th c.)

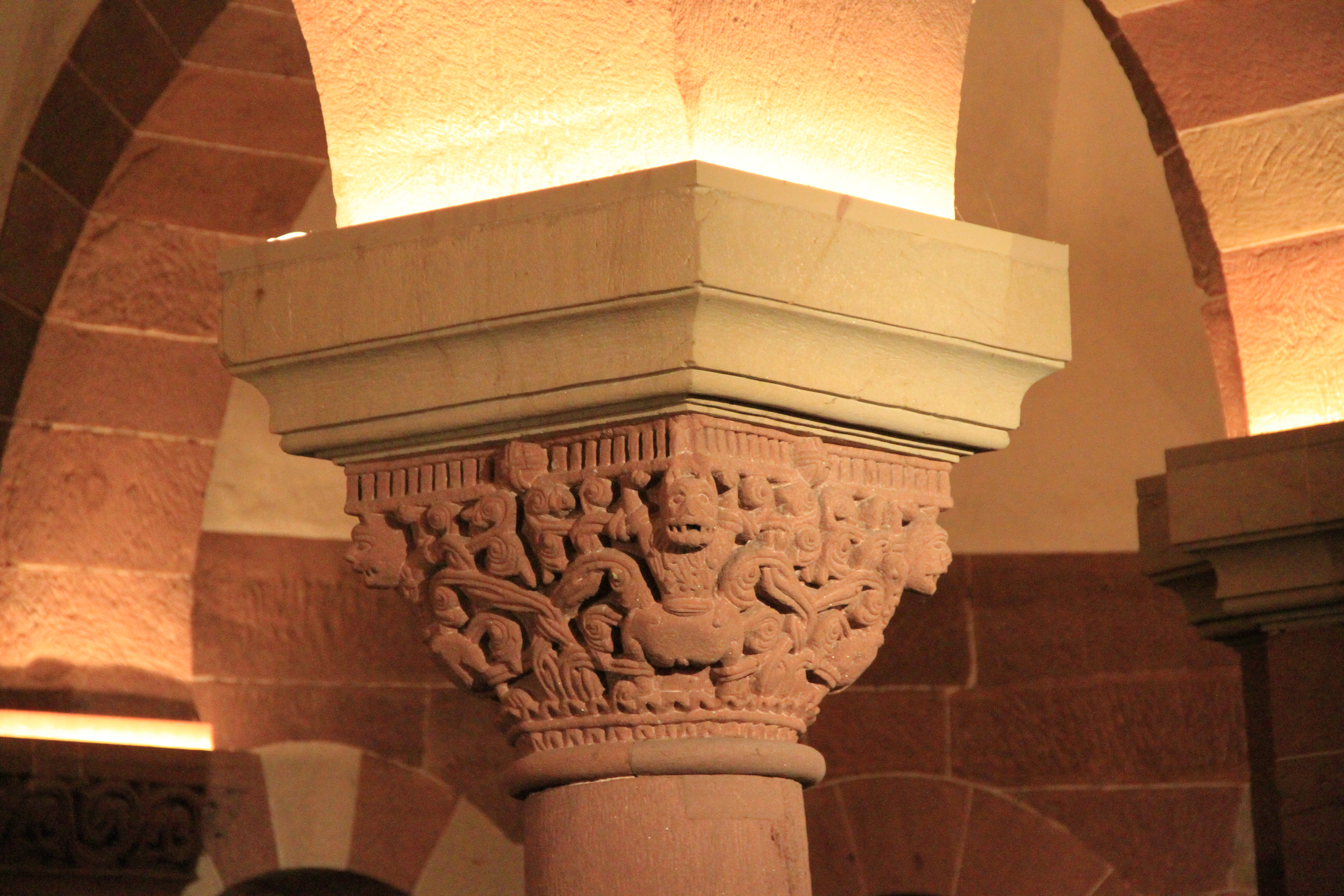
Capital of a crypt column, with monsters

The cathedral has two Romanesque crypts, the oldest parts of the cathedral. The more recent one is under the transept, from about 1150, and the older one, under the apse, was built in about 1110 to 1120. They are covered with Romanesque groin vaults, formed by the intersection of rounded barrel vaults, and supported by massive cruciform pillars and cylindrical columns with palm leaf decoration on their capitals. Some of the capitals also have sculpted monsters and lions on the corners. The larger crypt has three naves, of equal size, divided by slender columns. There are three stairways down to the crypt, the oldest, from the apse, dates to about 1150. The pilasters between the stairways are older, from 1015. Further modifications were made to the crypts in the 12th century.

== Bells ==
=== Ringing Bells ===
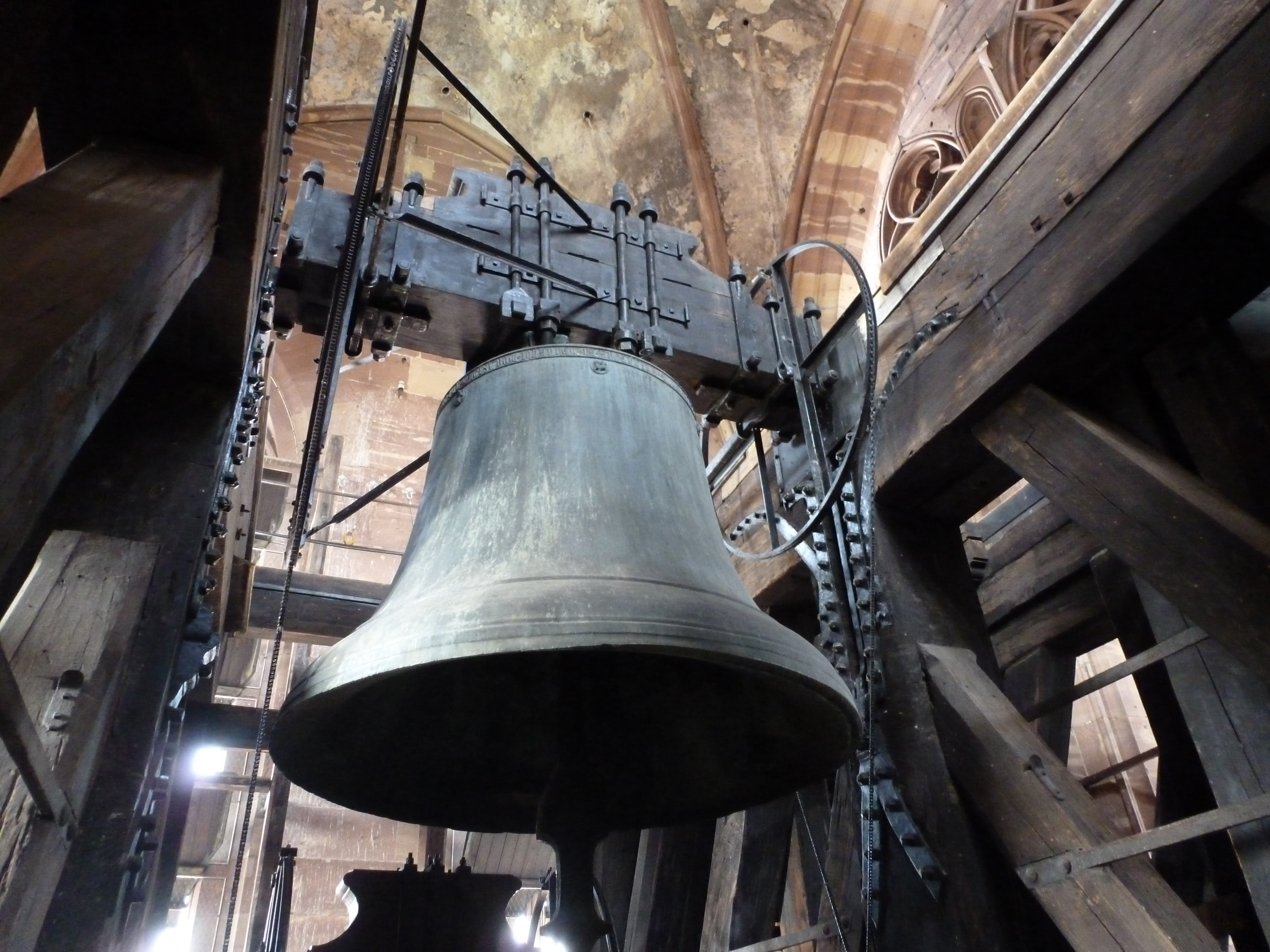
The Totenglocke is the bourdon bell of the cathedral.

The tower has a total of 14 bells, only 10 of which are use for pealing. In 1519 Strasbourg Cathedral commissioned Jerg von Speyer to create what was said to be the largest bell in Europe; 2.74 meters in diameter and weighing twenty tons. This enormous bell was installed but cracked shortly afterwards. Its place as the bourdon was taken by an older bell, the "Totenglocke", or "Death bell", which was traditionally used for mourning. It weighs 7.5 tons and 2.2 meters in diameter, and was cast in 1447 by Hans Gremp. It is still in place. During the French Revolution nine bells were taken out and melted down to make cannon, but the "Totonglocke" and a second bell, the "Zehrnerglocke" (1.58 meters, 2.225 tons), made in Mathieu Edel in 1786, were preserved to ring the hours and serve as alarm bells for the city. More recently, a group of six modern bells was cast in Heidelberg between 1974 and 1976; they range from 1.7 meters to 0.9 meters in diameter, and from 3.9 to 5.7 tons in weight.

Ringing Bells of the Cathedral
Bell Number	Bell Name (French)	Bell Name (German)	Bell Name (English)	Founder	Casting Year
1	N/A	Totonglocke	Death Bell (Bourdon)	Hans Gremp à Strasbourg	1427
2	Saint Jean-Baptiste et Jean l'évangéliste	N/A	Saint John the Baptist and John the Evangelist	Schilling à Heidelberg	1976
3	N/A	Zehrnerglocke	10 o'clock bell	Matthieu Edel à Strasbourg	1786
4	Sainte Vierge Marie	N/A	Holy Virgin Mary	Stumpf à Heidelberg	1975
5	Saints Pierre, Paul, Thomas et Marc	N/A	Saints Peter, Paul, Thomas and Mark	André Voegelé de Strasbourg et Frère Michaël de Maria Laach	2006
6	Saints Laurent, Étienne, Modeste et André	N/A	Saints Lawrence, Stephen, Modestus and Andrew	Stumpf à Heidelberg	1976
7	Sainte Croix	N/A	Holy Cross	Metz à Karlsruhe	1987
8	Saints Léon IX, Amand, Arbogast, Martin et Boniface	N/A	Saints Leo IX, Amand, Arbogast, Martin and Boniface	Stumpf à Heidelberg	1976
9	Saints Benoît, Colomban, Pirmin et Bernard	N/A	Saints Benedict, Columbanus, Pirmin and Bernard	Stumpf à Heidelberg	1976
10	Saints Odile, Attale, Elisabeth et Marie-Madeleine	N/A	Saints Odile, Attala, Elizabeth and Mary Magdalene	Stumpf à Heidelberg	1976

=== Clock Bells ===
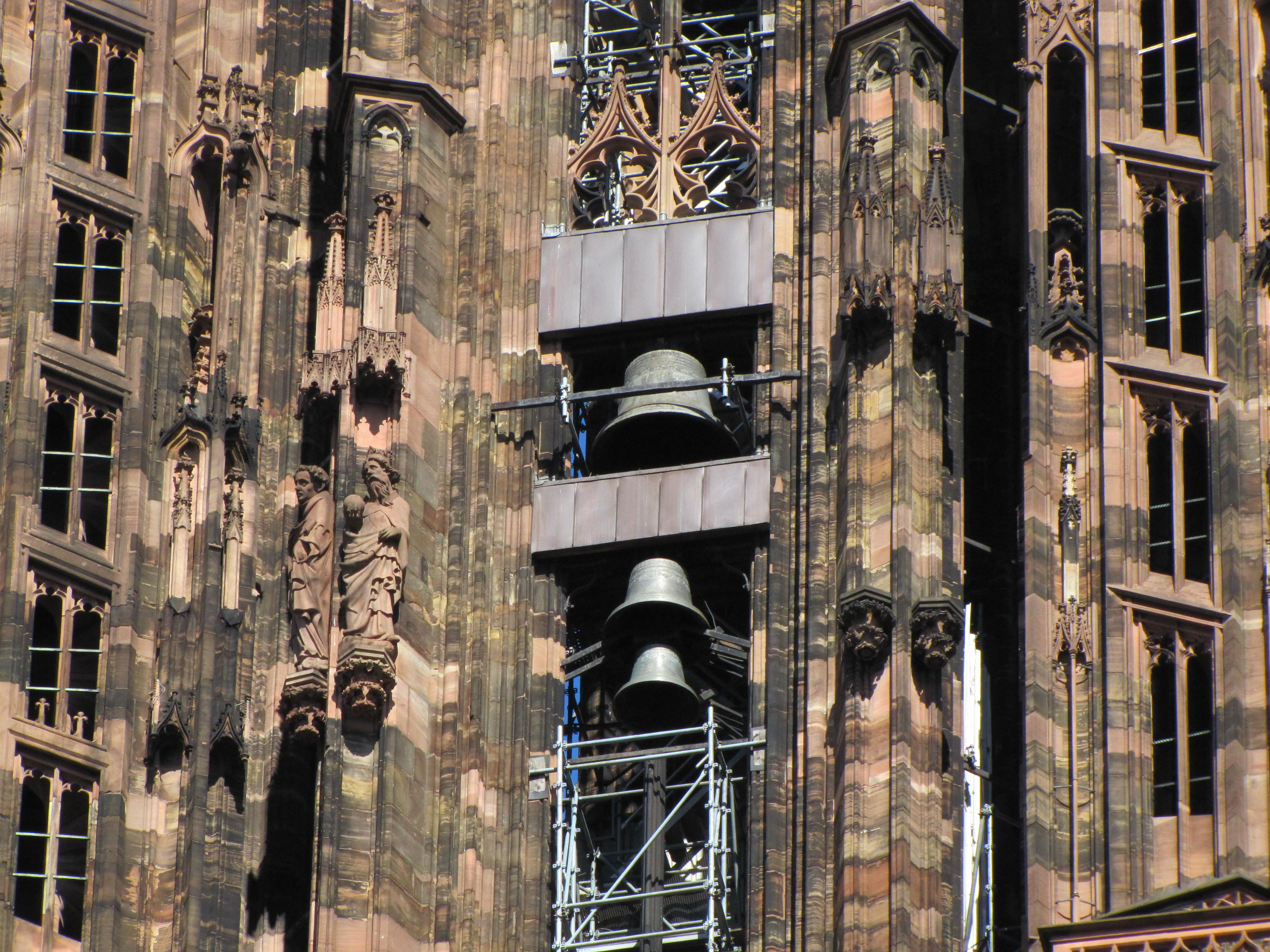
The hour bells visible in the tower

The four bells in the octagon tower are rung on the hour. These include an old bell made by Jean Rosier and Cesar Bonbon (1691). Another two old bells by Mathieu Edel (1787) ring on the quarter hours. An even older bell, by Jean Jacques-Miller (1595), repeats the sounding of the hours one minute later.

Under the roof of the Klotz tower are the six bells that ring the weekly masses but also the baptisms, marriages and deaths of parishioners.

== Tapestries ==
The cathedral has a group of fourteen tapestries depicting the life of the Virgin Mary. They were commissioned by Cardinal Richelieu for the Cathedral of Notre Dame de Paris, and were made to accompany a painting there, "The Vow of Louis XIII". They were manufactured between 1638 and 1657 in Paris by Pierre Damour. They were purchased by the Chapter of Strasbourg Cathedral in 1739, and were an example of the importation of the French style of that period into Alsace. They are traditionally hung in the arcades of the nave during Advent.

== Cathedral art in Strasbourg museums ==
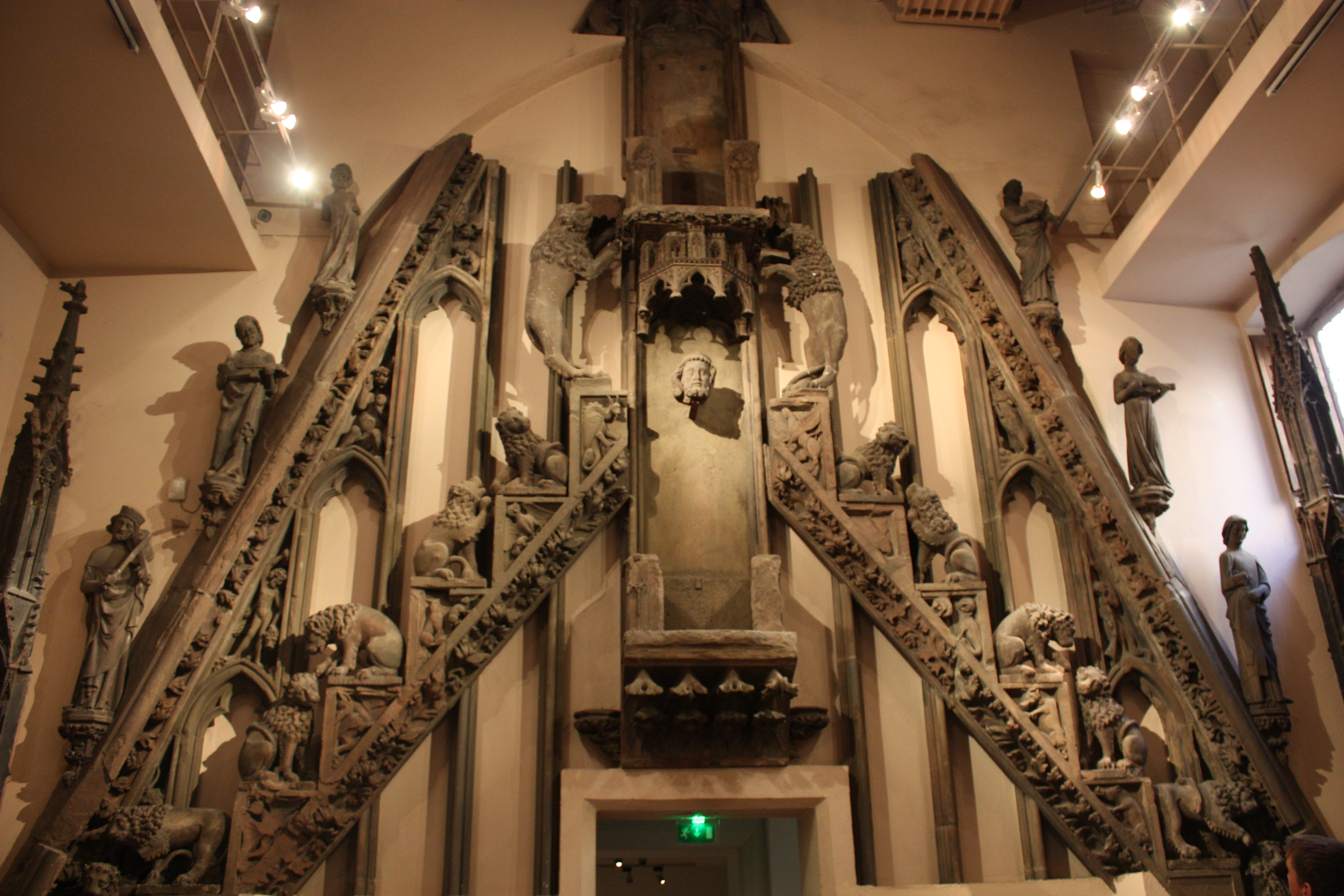
Original wimperg of the façade in the Musée de l'Œuvre Notre-Dame

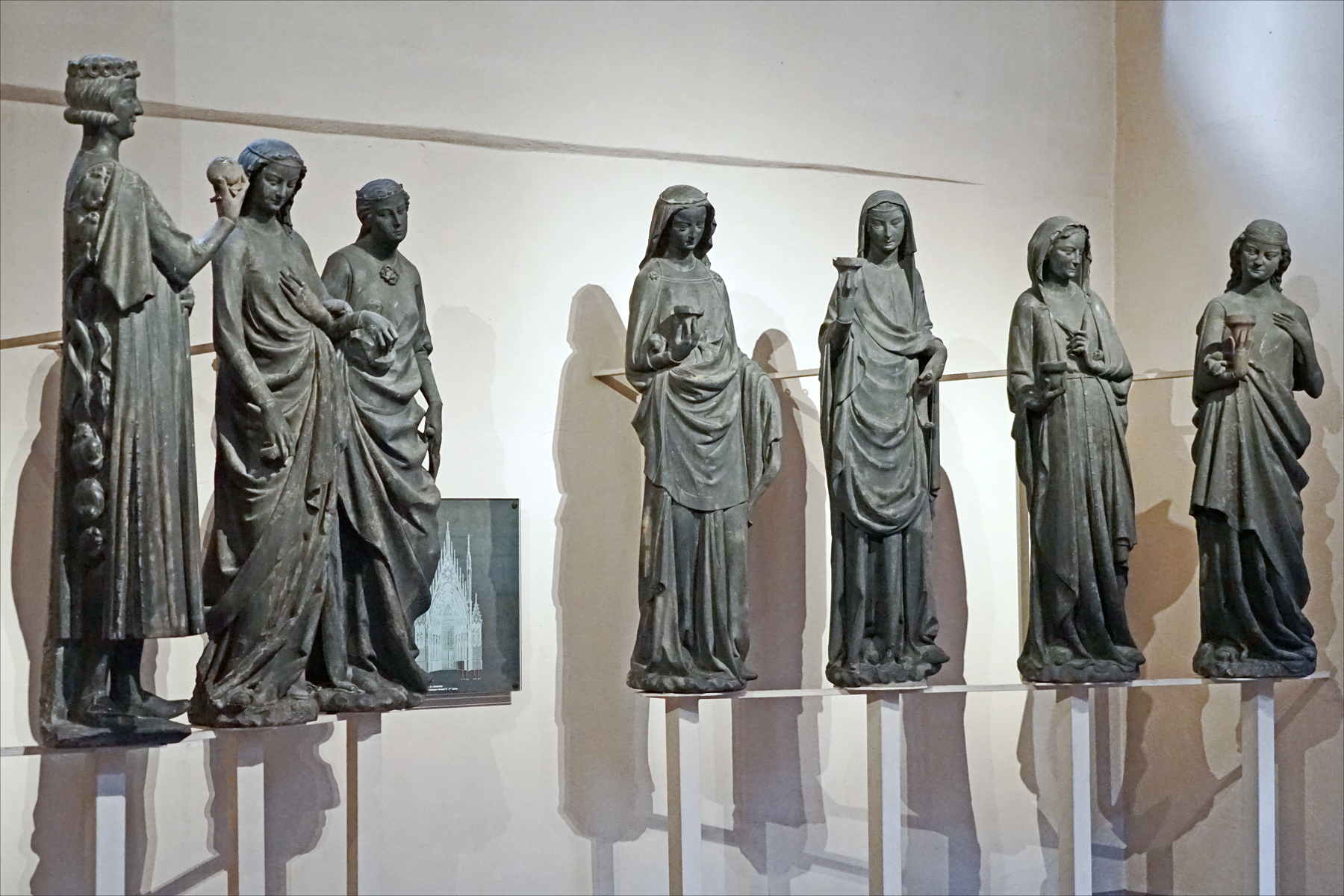
Original statues of the Tempter, the foolish Virgins and the wise Virgins from the right façade portal

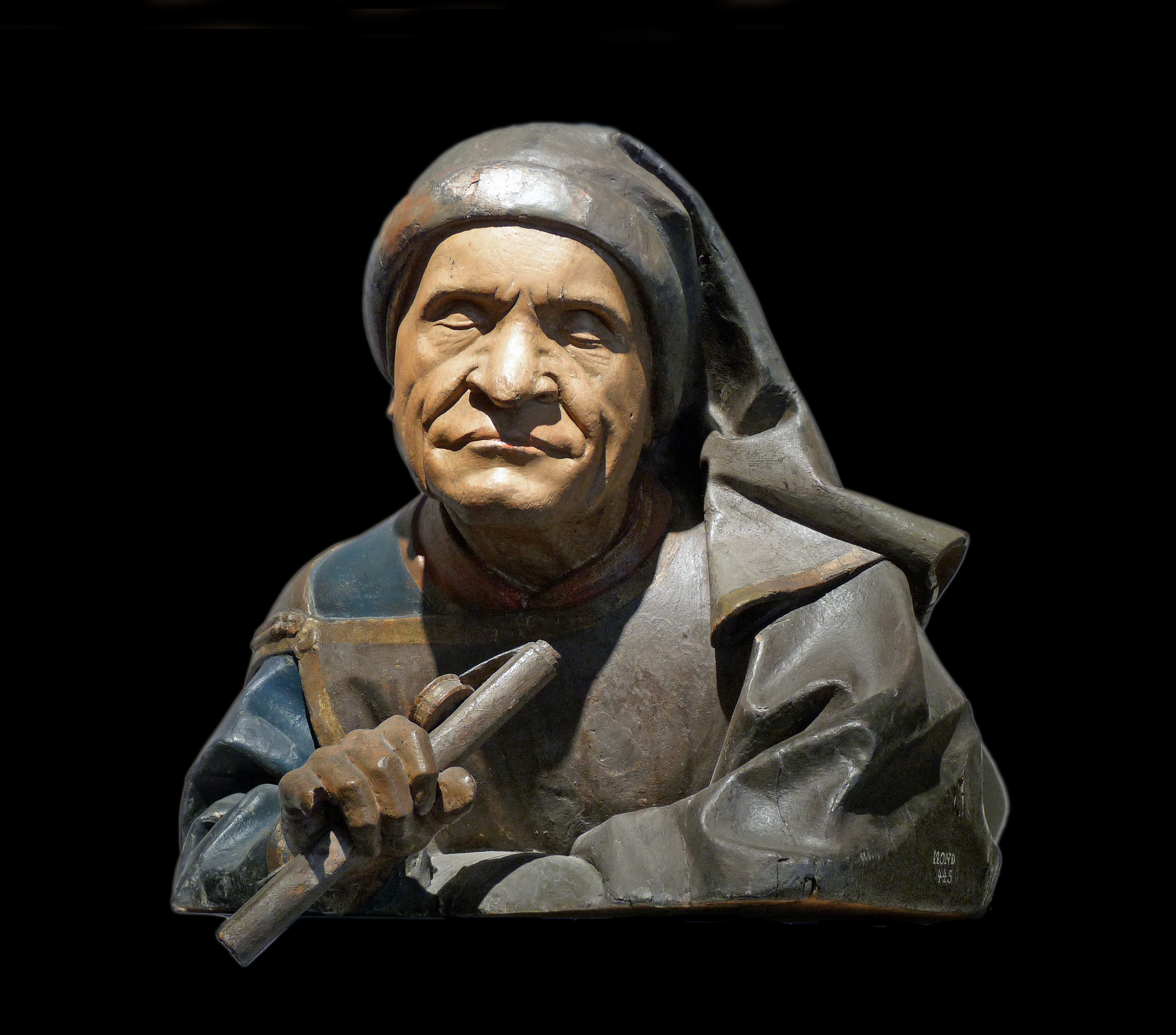
Bust (c. 1500) by Nikolaus Hagenauer, probably from the former main altar of the cathedral

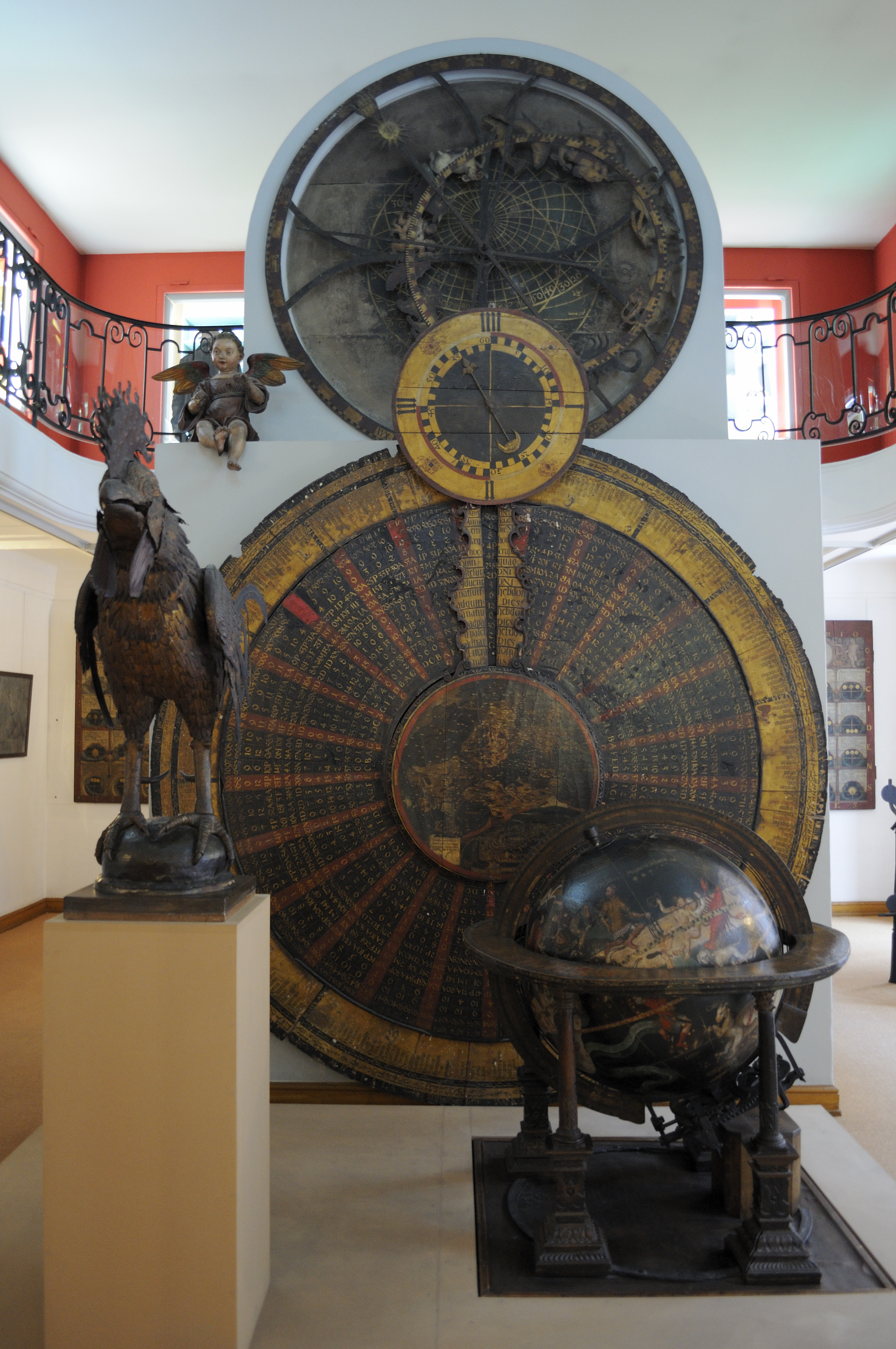
Parts of the original astronomical clock

The Musée de l'Œuvre Notre-Dame, or Museum of the Work of Notre-Dame, is located in a medieval and Renaissance building not far from the cathedral, and displays a collection of some of the most delicate original works of sculpture and art from Cathedral, moved there to protect them from environmental damage. These include some of the original statues from the portals and façade dating from the 13th century, including the statues of "The Church" and "The Synagogue" from the portal of the south transept. The statue of the "Synagogue" is blindfolded, since Jews did not recognise the divinity of Christ. It also preserves the earliest plans of the cathedral, as well as paintings and tapestries and other objects.

Other objects and works from the cathedral, including the mechanism of the original astronomical clock, are found in the Musée des arts décoratifs de Strasbourg.

== Personalities ==
- Johann Geiler von Kaysersberg, preacher (1478–1510)
- Matthäus Zell, preacher (1518–1523)
- Caspar Hedio, preacher (1523–1550)
- Johann Conrad Dannhauer, priest (1633–1666)
- Philipp Jakob Spener, preacher (1663–1666)
- Franz Xaver Richter, Kapellmeister (1769–1789)
- Ignaz Pleyel, Kapellmeister (1783–1795)

=== Burials ===
- Conrad de Lichtenberg

== Dimensions ==
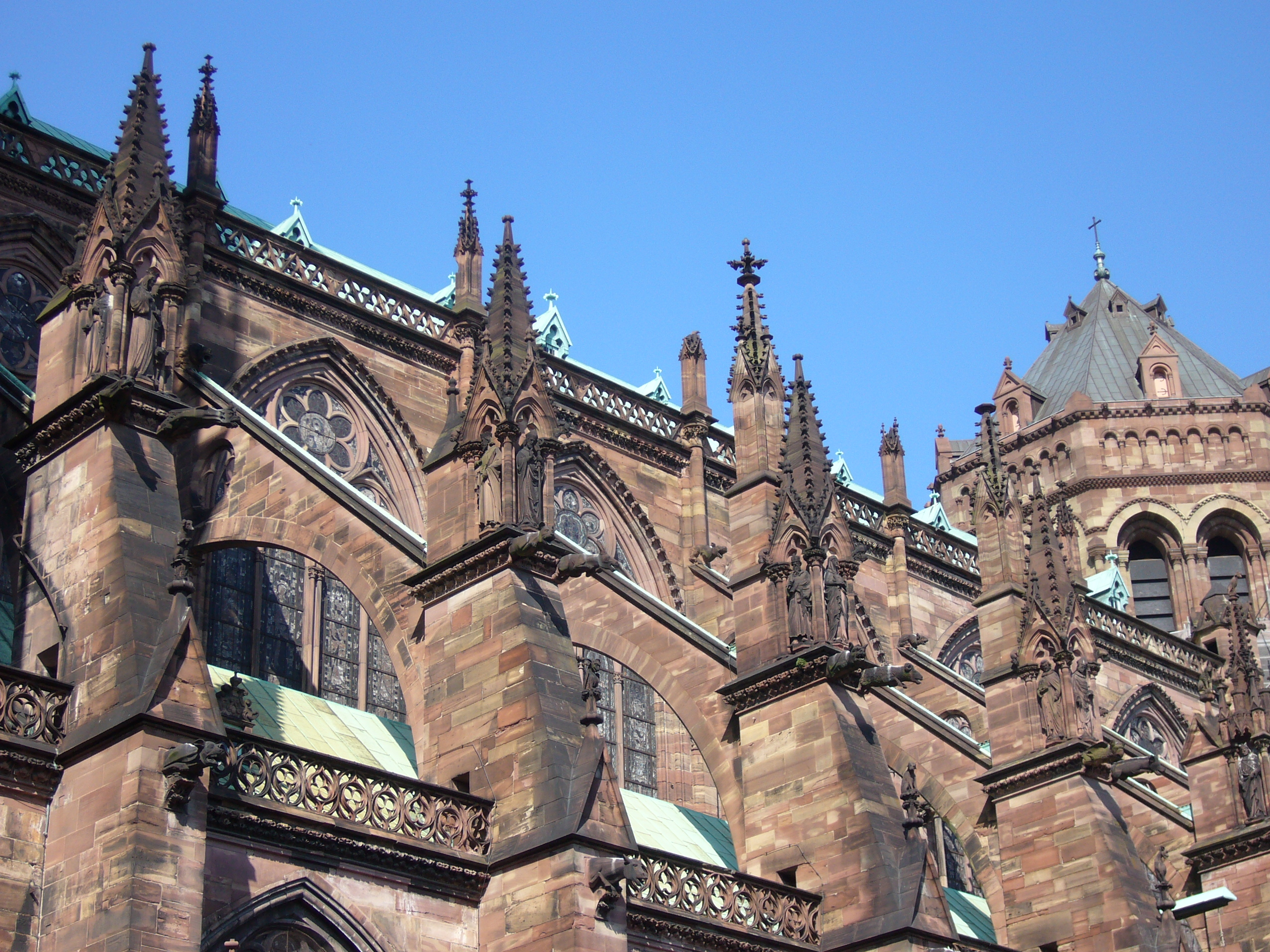
Flying buttresses on the southern side of the cathedral

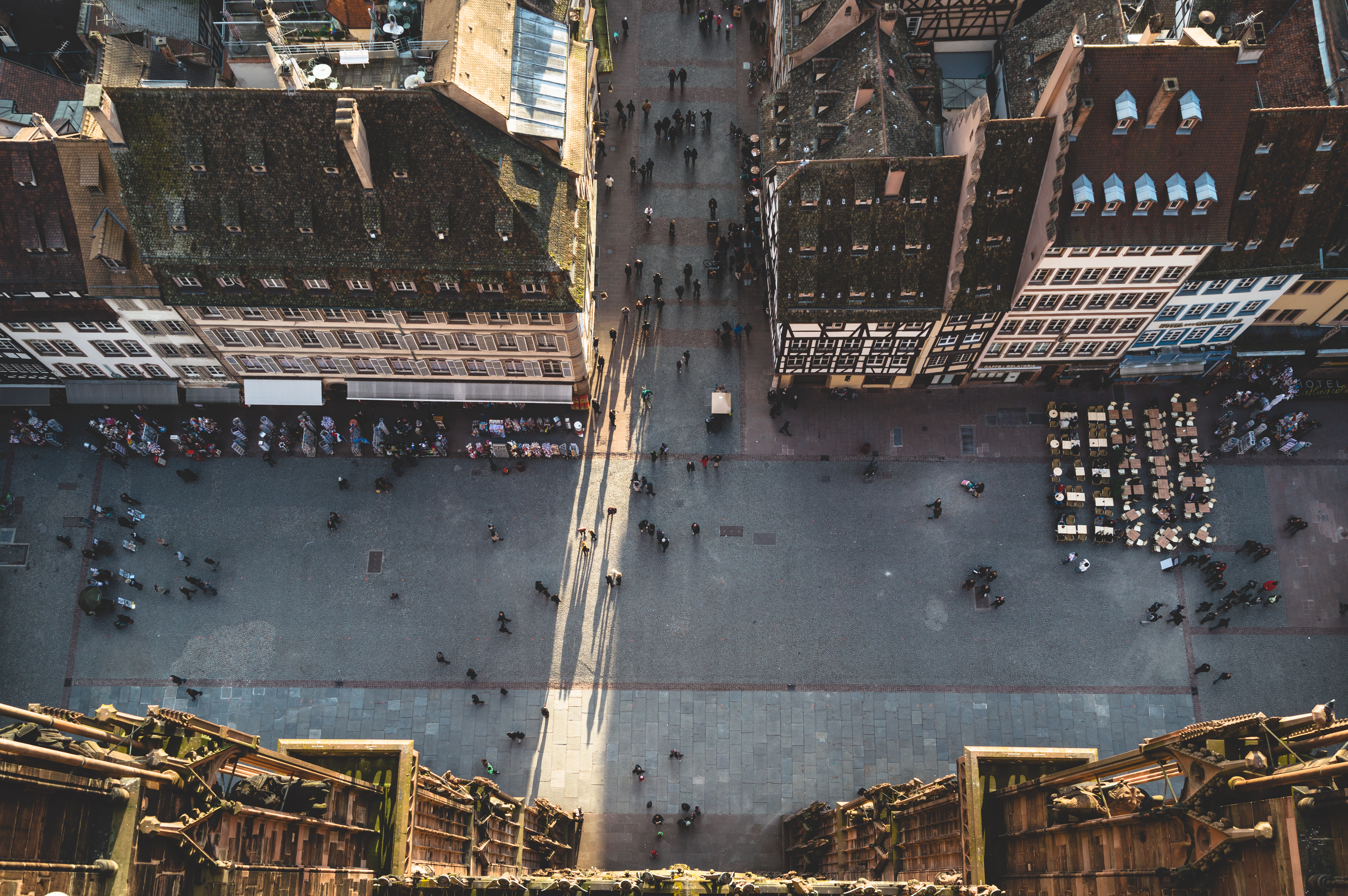
The square and façade from the observation deck. Rue Mercière joins the square from the southwest in this view

The known dimensions of the building are as follows:

- Total length: 112 m (367 ft)
- Total length inside: 103 m (338 ft)
- Height of spire: 142 m (466 ft)
- Height of observation deck: 66 m (217 ft)
- Height of crossing dome: 58 m (190 ft)
- Exterior height of central nave: 40 m (130 ft)
- Inside height of central nave: 32 m (105 ft)
- Inside width of central nave: 16 m (52 ft)
- Inside height of lateral naves: 19 m (62 ft)
- Inside height of narthex: 42 m (138 ft)
- Exterior width of west façade: 51.5 m (169 ft)
- Diameter of west façade rose window: 13.6 m (45 ft)
- Main construction area: 6,044 m^{2} (65,060 sq ft)
- Copper-covered roof area: 4,900 m^{2} (53,000 sq ft)
- Tile-covered roof area: 600 m^{2} (6,500 sq ft)
- Slate-covered roof area: 47 m^{2} (510 sq ft)

== Furnishings ==
Protestant and Revolutionary iconoclasm, the war periods of 1681, 1870 and 1940–1944, as well as changes in taste and liturgy, have taken a toll on some of Strasbourg Cathedral's most outstanding features such as the choir screen of 1252 and the successive high altars (ca. 1500 and 1682), but many treasures remain inside the building; others, or fragments of them, being displayed in the Musée de l'Œuvre Notre-Dame.

== See also ==
- Gothic cathedrals and churches
- French Gothic architecture
- List of Gothic cathedrals in Europe
- List of tallest structures built before the 20th century
- Episcopal Palace, Strasbourg
- Kammerzell House
- Parable of the Ten Virgins
- Sabina von Steinbach
- Saint-Thiébaut Church, Thann
- St. George's Church, Sélestat
- St. Peter and St. Paul's Church, Wissembourg

== Bibliography and further reading ==
- Baumann, Fabien; Muller, Claude: Notre-Dame de Strasbourg, Du génie humain à l’éclat divin, 2014, ISBN 2-7468-3188-0
- Bengel, Sabine; Nohlen, Marie-José; Potier, Stéphane: Bâtisseurs de Cathédrales. Strasbourg, mille ans de chantier, 2014, ISBN 2-8099-1251-3
- Doré, Joseph; Jordan, Benoît; Rapp, Francis; et al.: Strasbourg – La grâce d'une cathédrale, 2007, ISBN 2-7165-0716-3
- Recht, Roland; Foessel, Georges; Klein, Jean-Pierre: Connaître Strasbourg, 1988, ISBN 2-7032-0185-0, pages 47–55
- Sauvé, Jean-Sébastien: Notre-Dame de Strasbourg. Les façades gothiques, 2012, ISBN 978-3-939020-10-3
- Villes, Alain (2016). Cathédrale Notre-Dame de Strasbourg (in French). Paris: Monum, Éditions du Patrimoine, Centre des Monuments Nationaux. ISBN 978-2-7577-0485-1.

Records
Preceded by St. Mary's Church, Stralsund	World's tallest structure 1647–1874; 142 metres (466 ft)	Succeeded by St. Nicholas' Church, Hamburg
