= Grüneberg =

The name Grüneberg, Grueneberg, or Gruneberg can refer to the following articles:

- Hans Grüneberg, a British scientist
- Hermann Julius Grüneberg, a German pharmacist and industrialist and founder of Chemische Fabrik Kalk
- Grüneberg ganglion, an olfactory ganglion in rodents
