= Rue Mercière, Strasbourg =

Street in Strasbourg, France

Rue Mercière
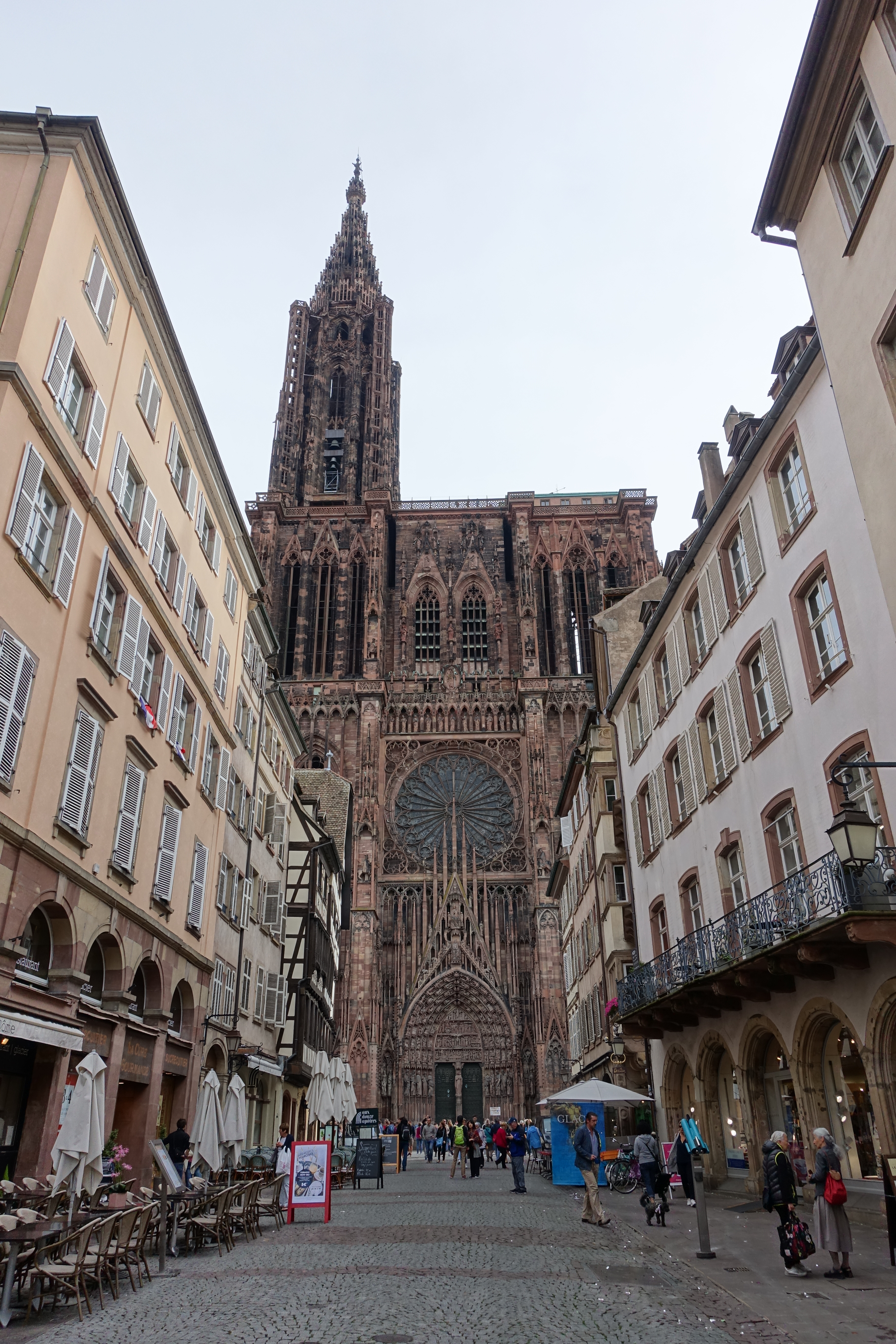
- A 2018 view of the Rue Mercière
- Interactive map of Rue Mercière
- Type: Street
- Location: Strasbourg, France
- Postal code: 67000

Construction
- Completion: Middle Ages

The Rue Mercière (French pronunciation: [ʁy mɛʁsjɛʁ]; Merchants Street in English) is a medieval street in Strasbourg, France. It runs for about 250 feet (76 m) and connects the Rue du Vieux-Marchè-aux-Poissons in the west to the Place de la Cathédrale, surrounding Strasbourg Cathedral, in the east. It is bisected by the Rue du Fossè des Tailleurs to the north and the Rue du Vieil Hôpital to the south.

The street is a popular viewing point from which to photograph the cathedral:

The front of the cathedral can be approached most dramatically along the Rue Merciere, a pedestrian street lined with solid halftimbered buildings that make a striking frame for the Gothic splendor towering beyond them. – "Old Strasbourg Offers A Taste Of Two Cultures", Barbara Bell, New York Times, July 31, 1983

In 1922, Hegemann and Peets wrote:

The Rue Mercière leads right to the central entrance of the cathedral. The effect is good because the street is narrow and short and the houses lining it are not too high. The appearance of the highly symmetrical central features of the western façade can thus dominate the view.

At the corner of the Place de la Cathédrale and the Rue Mercière stands the Pharmacie du Cerf. Established in 1268, it is the oldest pharmacy in France.

In 1995, Strasbourg City Council decided to add bilingual signs to around fifty streets in the city, including the Rue Mercière. Its other name became Krämergass.

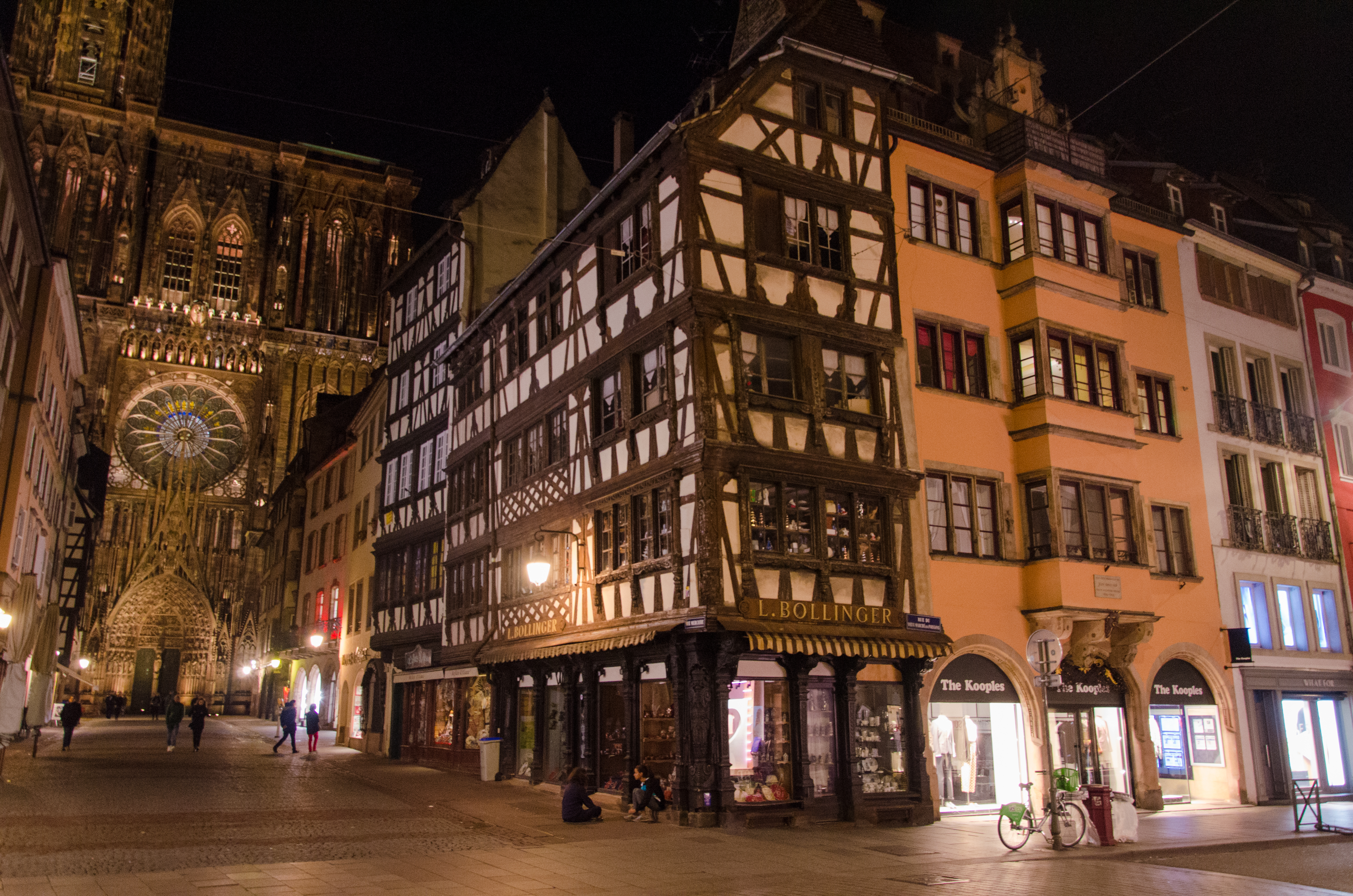
A nighttime view from the Rue du Vieux-Marchè-aux-Poissons

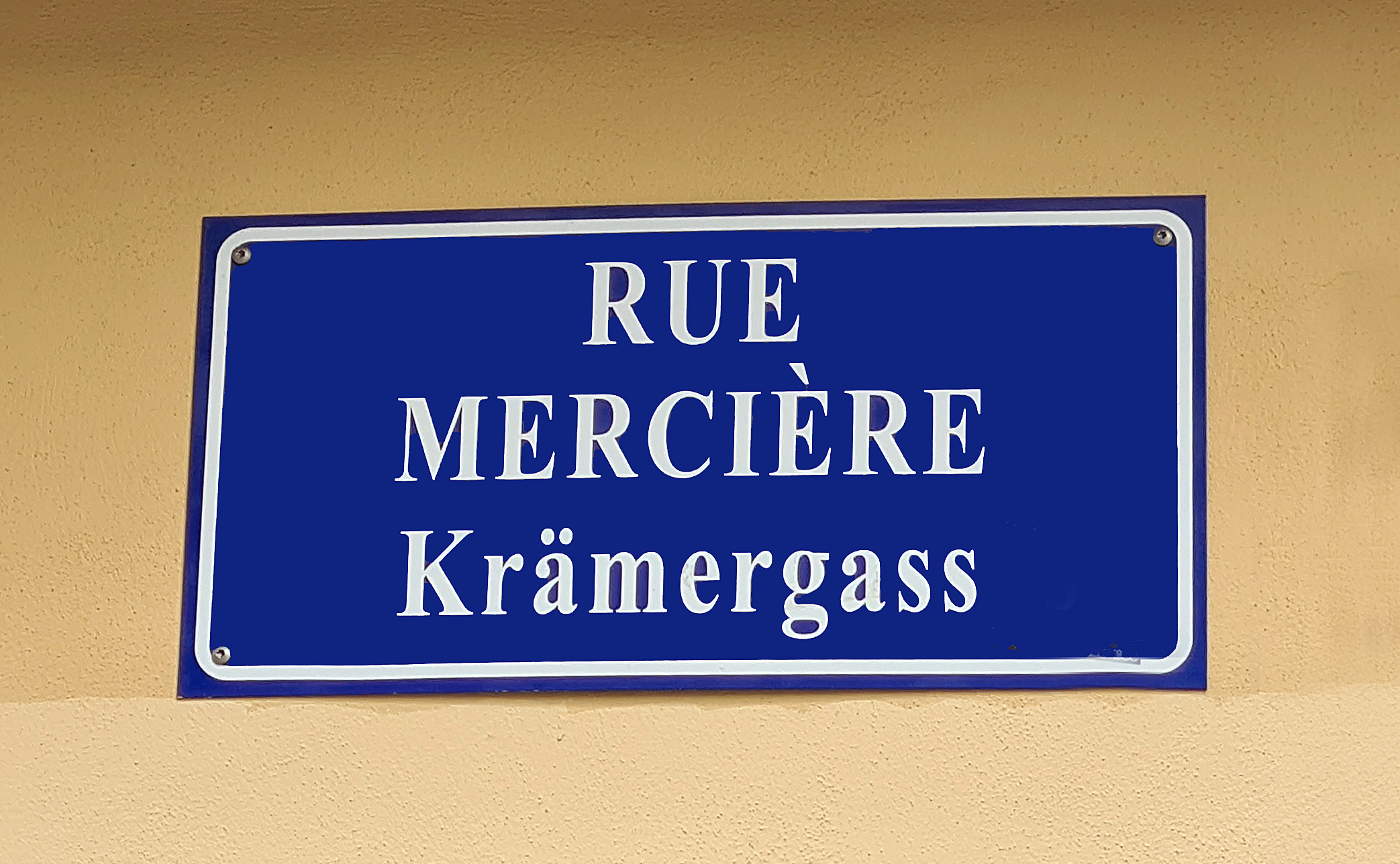
The Alsatian name of the street was added to its signs in 1995
