= Werner Hegemann =

German city planner and architecture critic (1881–1936

- Born: June 15, 1881; Mannheim, Germany
- Died: April 12, 1936 (aged 54); New York City, US
- Education: Humboldt University of Berlin, University of Pennsylvania, Ludwig-Maximilians-Universität München (LMU)
- Occupations: City planner, architecture critic
- Spouse: Alice von Pechmann
- Children: 1
- Relatives: Julius Vorster (maternal grandfather)

Werner Hegemann (June 15, 1881 – April 12, 1936) was a city planner, architecture critic, and political writer in Germany's Weimar Republic. His published criticism of Hitler and the Nazi party required him to leave Germany with his family in 1933. He died in New York City.

== Biography ==
Hegemann was the son of Ottmar Hegemann (1839–1900), a manufacturer in Mannheim, and Elise Caroline Friedrich Vorster (1846–1911), daughter of Julius Vorster, a founder of Chemische Fabrik Kalk in Cologne. After graduating from Gymnasium Schloss Plön in 1901, he began college studies in Berlin; studied art history and economics in Paris; economics at the University of Pennsylvania (1904–05) and in Strasbourg, and in 1908 completed his doctorate in economics at the Ludwig-Maximilians-Universität München (LMU). In 1905 he married Alice Hesse (1882–1976) in Berlin. The couple had one child, Ellis, in 1906. After obtaining his Ph.D. in 1908, Hegemann returned to the United States (with his wife and child) and worked as a Philadelphia housing inspector. In 1909 he was in Boston, working with the Boston-1915 Movement, a five-year plan to develop and improve the Boston area.

Back in Berlin in 1910 Hegemann was General Secretary of the Universal City Planning Exhibition held in Berlin in May and June of that year. The exhibition aroused great interest and was reprised in refocused form in Düsseldorf; Hegemann wrote an article about it for a general audience and a two-volume official book. These city planning exhibitions were the first of their kind: Hegemann was in the right place at the right time to play a formative role in the early development of city planning as a profession. Arguing for reform, he described the existing urban fabric of Berlin as "Dwellings so bad that neither the stupidest devil nor the most diligent speculator could have devised anything worse."

In 1912 Hegemann accepted an invitation from Frederic C. Howe, Director of the People's Institute in New York, to give lectures on city planning in over 20 American cities. In California, he produced a land-use plan for Oakland and Berkeley that has been called "America's first zoning code." In 1916, while in the U.S., he was divorced from Alice Hesse.

As World War I ended Hegemann lived in Milwaukee, where he was deeply involved in work and writing another book. He had established "Hegemann & Peets," a firm specializing in city and suburban planning, with landscape architect Elbert Peets. The firm designed the Washington Highlands Historic District, and Wyomissing Park, a "Modern Garden Suburb" in Reading, Pennsylvania. In late 1918, visiting his friend Fiske Kimball at the University of Michigan, Hegemann met Ida Belle Guthe, daughter of Karl Eugen Guthe. In 1920 the couple married at the bride's home in Ann Arbor, Michigan. In 1921 Hegemann completed work on The American Vitruvius: An Architects' Handbook of Civic Art with Elbert Peets, a "thesaurus" of civic art for architects, commenting on about 1200 examples of the discipline (published in 1922).

In 1931 he made a lecture tour through South America, visiting Argentina, where he attended a local convention on urban planning at Mar del Plata. Hegemann gave a lecture criticising European aesthetics, patterns and planning of this resort city.

In February 1933, a few weeks after Hitler took power and contemporaneously with the Reichstag Fire, Hegemann published Entlarvte Geschichte ("Unmasked History"), a book critically and sarcastically questioning the origins of and role models for the Nazi Party. He left Germany on the evening before publication. With characteristic irony Hegemann dedicated the book to Adolf Hitler, leading Nazi bookstores to promote it for three weeks before discovering the ruse and banning the book. In the May 1933 Nazi book burnings he was denounced as an "Historical Forger," with his books burned with the Nazi "Fire Oath," "Against the falsification of our history and disparagement of its great figures! For reverence for our past!" After several months in Geneva and France, Hegemann was invited by Alvin Johnson to teach urban planning at The New School for Social Research in New York City beginning in November 1933. That October Hegemann left Europe for the United States with his wife and four young children. He was one of many intellectuals essentially exiled from Germany due to Nazi hostility and persecution. Upon arriving in New York City on November 4, 1933, Hegemann opined that the German people would not tolerate Hitler for more than two more years. He began lecturing at the New School and organizing assistance for intellectuals and scholars detained by the Nazis in Germany, such as Carl von Ossietzky, another German critic of Hitler, who was arrested and imprisoned by the Nazi's in the same month that Hegemann left Germany. He also wrote in support of Roosevelt's New Deal. In 1935 Hegemann began teaching at Columbia University. In 1934 the Nazis seized Hegemann's house in Nikolassee, and in 1938 revoked his doctorate.

Hegemann's early years in the United States, along with his strong education and broad interests, made him an intermediary between city planners and architects throughout Europe and on both sides of the Atlantic. In particular, his The American Vitruvius refers extensively to European design, taking many examples from his book on the Berlin 1910 exhibition, while in Amerikanische Architektur und Stadtbaukunst he informs German architects of American solutions. However, his emphasis on urban planning rather than purely formal considerations and possibly his having not been present during the development in Europe of the Modern Movement in architecture put him at odds with modernists. For example, in 1929 he was forced to retract an accusation that Martin Wagner's primary activity as chief of city planning for Berlin was funneling architectural commissions to extremist friends, and he labeled Le Corbusier's Ville Contemporaine project for transforming Paris "only vieux jeu" (old hat), sarcastically predicting that it was likely to be realized,

[not] because [the skyscrapers] are desirable, healthy, beautiful, and reasonable from the perspective of urban planning but because they are theatrical, romantic, unreasonable, and generally harmful, and because it is part of the money-making activities of a metropolis, in what is literally the world's most international city, Paris, to serve the need for sensation and the vices of native and imported fools.

== Writing ==
Hegemann authored the book Der Gerettete Christus (Translated as Christ Rescued) in 1928. The book discusses a variant of the swoon hypothesis that Jesus did not die on the cross. When the book was published, blasphemy proceedings were filed by Berlin authorities against Hegemann for asserting that Jesus was not crucified.

During the late 1920s Hegemann published two historical books debunking German heroes: Fredericus (published in Germany in 1926 with an English translation in 1929), and Napoleon, or Prostration Before the Hero (published in Germany in 1927 with an English translation in 1931). In 1931 he made a lecture tour through South America, visiting Argentina, where he attended a local convention on urban planning at Mar del Plata. Hegemann gave a lecture criticising European aesthetics, patterns and planning of this resort city. Back to Germany, he devoted himself increasingly to warnings against the National Socialists in a series of political articles.

== Death ==
In New York in early 1936, Hegemann became ill, first diagnosed with sciatica and then hospitalized with apparent pneumonia. His illness developed during a time of great stress, as he worked to support his family after having to leave all his assets behind in Germany. While bed-ridden at Doctors Hospital he worked on his last book, the three-volume City Planning, Housing, intended to supplement and update The American Vitruvius. Eventually completed by two co-editors, the last volume appeared in 1938. Hegemann died on April 12, 1936, at age 54. The treating doctor opined that the cause of death was tuberculous meningitis.

== Selected works ==
- Der Städtebau nach den Ergebnissen der Allgemeinen Städtebau-Ausstellung in Berlin, nebst einem anhang: Die Internationale Städtebau-Ausstellung in Düsseldorf; 600 wiedergaben des Bilder- und Planmaterials der beiden Ausstellungen, mit Förderung durch die königlichen preussischen Ministerien des Inneren, des Handels und der öffentlichen Arbeiten, sowie durch die Städte Berlin, Charlottenburg, Rixdorf, Schöneberg, Wilmersdorf, Potsdam, Spandau, Lichtenberg und Düsseldorf. Herausgegeben im Auftrage der Arbeitsausschüsse von Dr. Werner Hegemann, Generalsekretär der Städtebau-Ausstellungen in Berlin und Düsseldorf. 2 vols. Berlin: Wasmuth, 1911, 1913. (in German)
- The American Vitruvius: An Architects' Handbook of Civic Art, with Elbert Peets, New York: Architectural Book Publishing, 1922.
- Fridericus; oder Das Königsopfer, J. Hegner, Germany 1924
- Napoleon: oder Kniefall vor dem Heros, J. Hegner, Germany 1927
- Amerikanische Architektur und Stadtbaukunst: ein Überblick über den heutigen Stand der amerikanischen Baukunst in ihrer Beziehung zum Städtebau. Berlin: Wasmuth, 1925. (in German)
- Das Steinerne Berlin: Geschichte der grössten Mietkasernenstadt der Welt. Berlin: Kiepenhauer, 1930. (in German)
- Der Gerettete Christus, 1928 (Translated from the German by Gerald Griffin as Christ Rescued, 1933).
- Mar del Plata: El Balneario y El Urbanismo Moderno. Mar del Plata, 1931. (in Spanish)
- Entlarvte Geschichte. Aus Nacht zum Licht. Von Arminius bis Hitler. Leipzig: Hegner, 1933. (in German)
- City planning, Housing. 3 vols. Vols. 2 and 3 with William W. Forster and Robert C. Weinberg. New York: Architectural Book Publishing, 1936–38. OCLC 837328

== Sources ==
- Caroline Flick, Werner Hegemann (1881–1936): Stadtplanung, Architektur, Politik: ein Arbeitsleben in Europa und den USA. Munich: Saur, 2005 (in German)
- Christiane Crasemann Collins, Werner Hegemann and the Search for Universal Urbanism, New York: Norton, 2005.
