= Elbert Peets =

American landscape architect, city planner and author

Elbert Peets (1886–1968) was an American landscape architect, city planner, and author who designed several influential garden cities and wrote extensively about urban design issues.

== Education ==
Born in Ohio, Peets received an undergraduate degree from Western Reserve University, in Cleveland, in 1912 and a master's degree in landscape architecture from Harvard University in 1915. After graduation, he taught horticulture at Harvard.

== Career ==
Peets worked primarily in Wisconsin, Cleveland, and Washington, D.C. In 1916 he began a collaboration with the German planner and critic Werner Hegemann and in 1922 they published a seminal work of city planning, "The American Vitruvius: An Architect's Handbook of Civic Art". Peets served as an engineer planner with the Army during World War I. In 1917 he won Harvard's Charles Eliot Travelling Fellowship and with these funds he traveled throughout Europe in 1920. After Hegemann returned to Europe in 1921, Peets practiced on his own for the next decade, continuing to write about topics ranging from Baroque cities to tree care. During the Great Depression, Peets joined the U.S. Farm Resettlement Administration (1935–38) and served as chief of the site planning section for the U.S. Housing Authority until 1944.

After World War II he worked as a consultant to such clients as the National Capital Planning Commission. He served on the U.S. Commission of Fine Arts from 1950 to 1958 and taught at Harvard and Yale Universities between 1950 and 1960. His planning projects include several with Hegemann, among them the new towns of Kohler, Washington Highlands Historic District in Wauwatosa, and Lake Forest, Wisconsin; Wyomissing Park, Pennsylvania; Park Forest, Illinois; Bannockburn, Maryland; and Greendale, Wisconsin, one of three greenbelt cities developed by the Resettlement Administration in the 1930s. Peets designed Greendale around a central green space that terminated in a town hall based on the Governor's Palace in Williamsburg, Virginia.

== Writings ==
In his writings Peets carefully analyzed American and European city plans, the development of spatial enclosures and long vistas, the London of Christopher Wren and the Paris of Baron Haussmann, and he adapted what he learned for his own town plans. He conducted particularly close study of the 1791 L'Enfant Plan for Washington, D.C., creating a verbal and pictorial image of how the city would have appeared if developed as Pierre Charles L'Enfant intended. He examined which of L'Enfant's planned effects had been lost through subsequent development, including implementation of the 1901 Senate Park Commission Plan (McMillan Plan)—for example, the blocking of many visual axes to the Washington Monument. In his essay on Peets in "Pioneers of American Landscape Design", Arnold R. Alanen describes him as "iconoclastic," and indeed in his writings Peets questioned such revered American institutions as picturesque landscape gardening, Central Park, and the Lincoln Memorial for what he saw as their conventionality or inappropriateness. Peets's papers are in the collections of the Cornell University Library.

== Additional sources ==
- Thomas E. Luebke, ed., "Civic Art: A Centennial History of the U.S. Commission of Fine Arts" (Washington, D.C.: U.S. Commission of Fine Arts, 2013): Appendix B.
