= K+S =

German chemical company

K+S AG
- Company type: Aktiengesellschaft
- Traded as: FWB: SDF; MDAX
- Industry: Chemicals
- Founded: 1889; 137 years ago
- Headquarters: Kassel, Germany
- Key people: Burkhard Lohr (CEO and Chairman of the executive board), Dr. Andreas Kreimeyer (Chairman of the supervisory board)
- Products: Fertilizers, plant chemicals, salt
- Revenue: €3.70 billion (2020)
- Operating income: €39.9 million (2020)
- Net income: €-1.803 billion (2020)
- Total assets: €9.101 billion (end 2020)
- Total equity: €2.223 billion (end 2020)
- Number of employees: 11,135 (FTE, end 2020)
- Website: www.kpluss.com

K+S AG (formerly Kali und Salz GmbH) is a German chemical company headquartered in Kassel. The company is Europe’s largest supplier of potash for use in fertilizer. The firm also produces and distributes other mineral fertilizers, such as those from magnesium and sulfur. K+S is mainly active in Europe, North and South America with almost 15,000 employees worldwide (2020).

== History ==
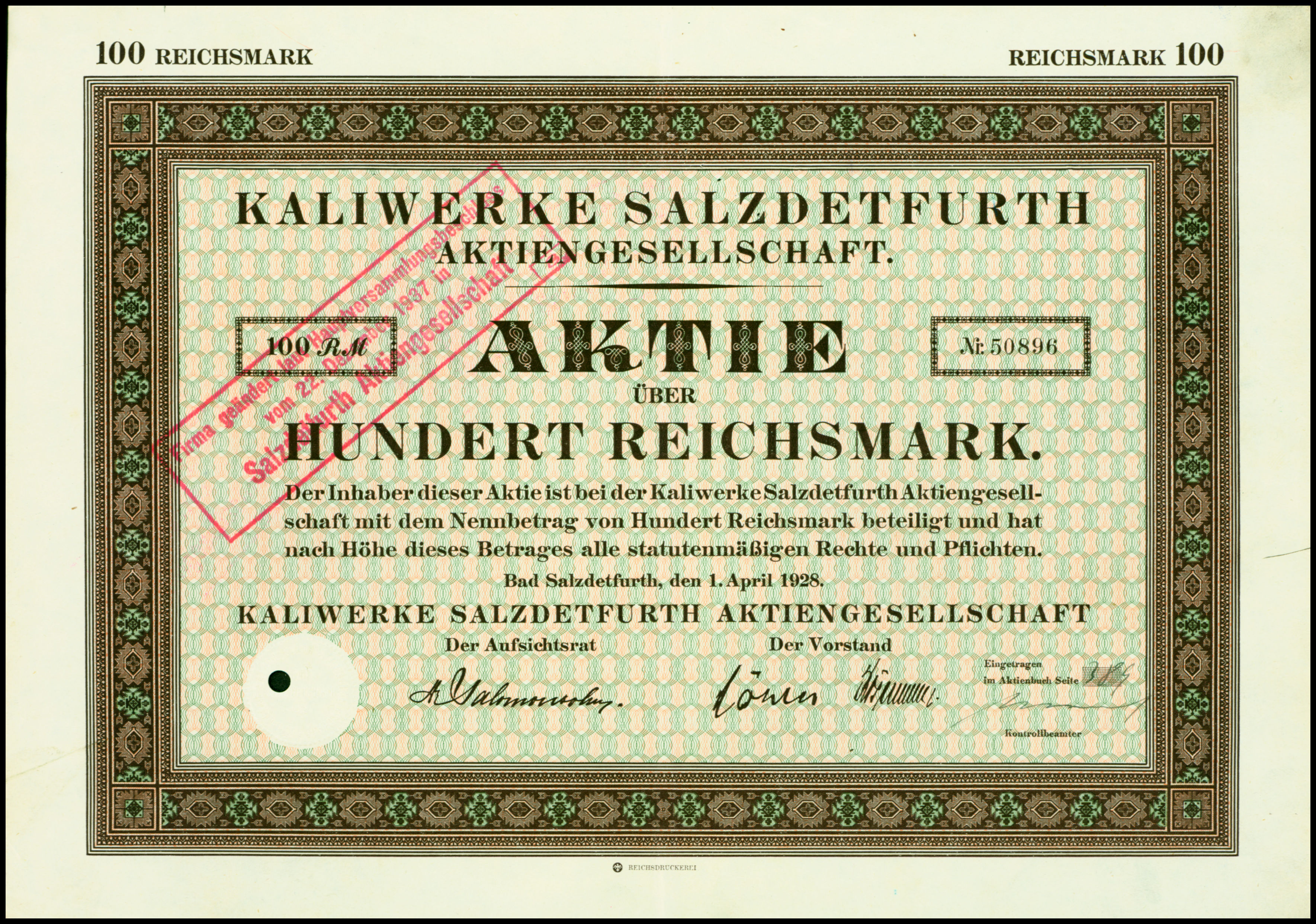
Share of the Kaliwerke Salzdetfurth AG, issued 1. April 1928

K+S was founded in 1889 as Aktiengesellschaft für Bergbau und Tiefbohrung, was renamed to Kaliwerke Salzdetfurth AG in 1899, and was again renamed to Salzdetfurth AG in 1937. After merging with the potash division of BASF subsidiary Wintershall in 1973, the company was renamed to Kali und Salz (Kalium = potassium and Salz = salt in German). In 1999, the company was renamed K+S. From September 2008 to March 2016, the stock was part of German stock index DAX, consisting of the 30 major German companies trading on the Frankfurt Stock Exchange. It was excluded from the DAX because of inadequate market capitalization. K+S has expanded internationally and is represented in 22 countries in 4 continents. K+S is used in Europe and is found in Belgium, the Czech Republic, France, Germany, Italy, the Netherlands, Poland, Portugal, Russia, Spain, Sweden, Switzerland and the United Kingdom. It is found in North America in The Bahamas, Canada and the US . In South America it can be found in Brazil, Chile and Peru, China, India and Singapore in Asia, and South Africa in Africa

== Subsidiaries ==
- K+S Potash Canada GP, based in Saskatoon, Canada
- K+S KALI GmbH, based in Kassel, Germany
- esco – European salt company GmbH & Co.KG, based in Hannover, Germany
- Chemische Fabrik Kalk, based in Cologne, Germany
- K+S Transport GmbH, based in Hamburg, Germany

== See also ==
- Morton Salt, former subsidiary of K+S
- Canadian Salt Company, former subsidiary of K+S
- Chemische Fabrik Kalk, a former subsidiary of K+S
