= Place de la Cathédrale, Strasbourg =

Square in Strasbourg, France

Place de la Cathédrale
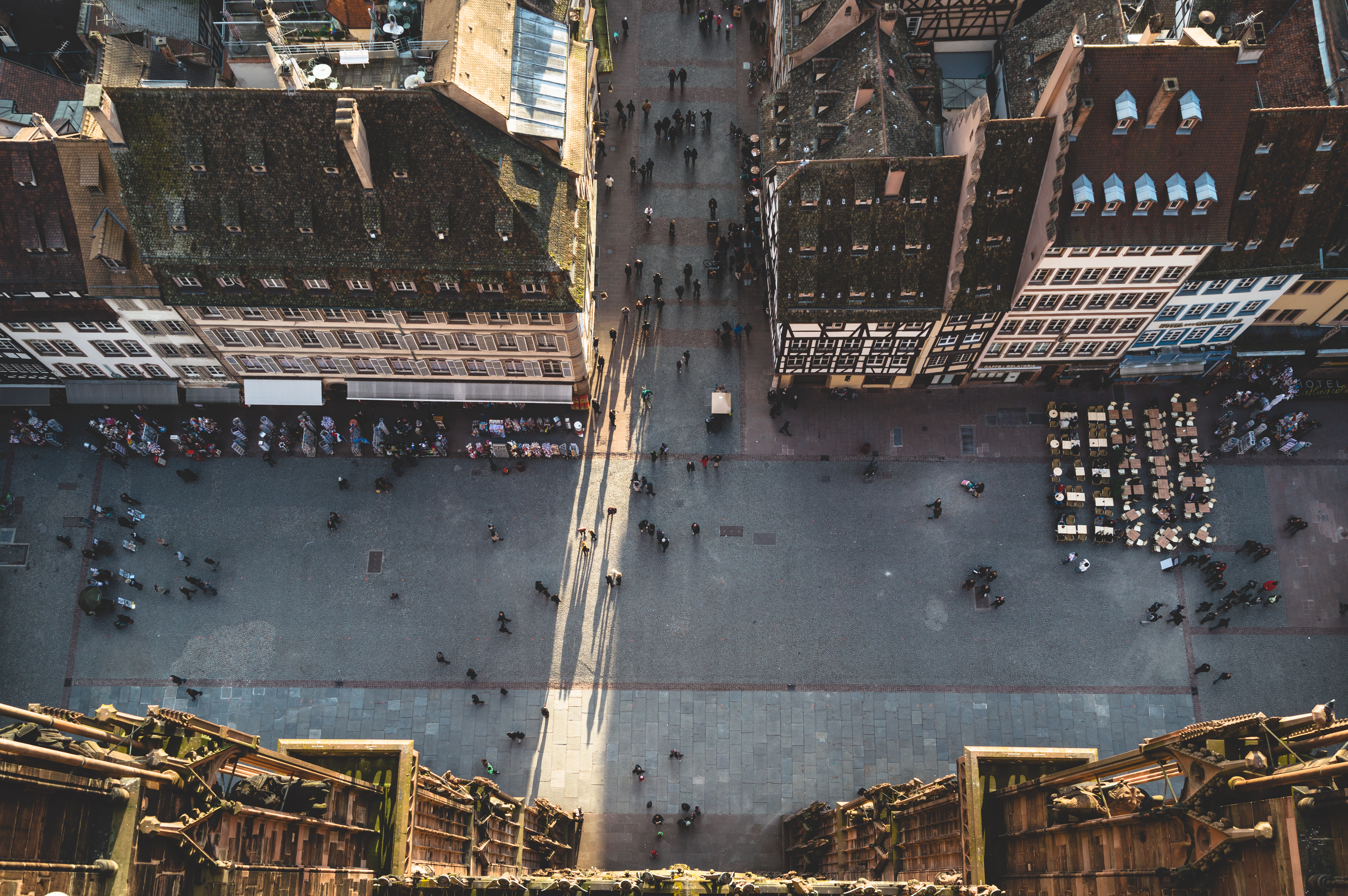
- Looking down on the western portion of the square from the cathedral, with the Rue Mercière entering from the top of the picture
- Interactive map of Place de la Cathédrale
- Namesake: Strasbourg Cathedral
- Type: Public square
- Location: Strasbourg, Alsace, France
- Coordinates: 48.5816042°N 7.7502193°E

The Place de la Cathédrale (French pronunciation: [plas də la katedʁal], "Cathedral Square") is a public square in Strasbourg, France, surrounding Strasbourg Cathedral.

The square is accessed from the west by the Rue Mercière, from the south by the Rue du Maroquin, the Place du Château and the Rue de la Râpe, and from the north by Passage de la Cathédrale. Other streets, such as that beside Maison Kammerzell (built in 1571) to the northwest, use the Place de la Cathédrale name.

In 2000, authorities foiled a plot by ten Islamic militants to bomb the Christkindelsmärik, which takes place in the square.

== Constituent buildings ==
- Maison Kammerzell
- Lycée Fustel-de-Coulanges
- Palais Rohan
- Musée de L'Œuvre-Notre-Dame
- Pharmacie du Cerf, the oldest pharmacy in France
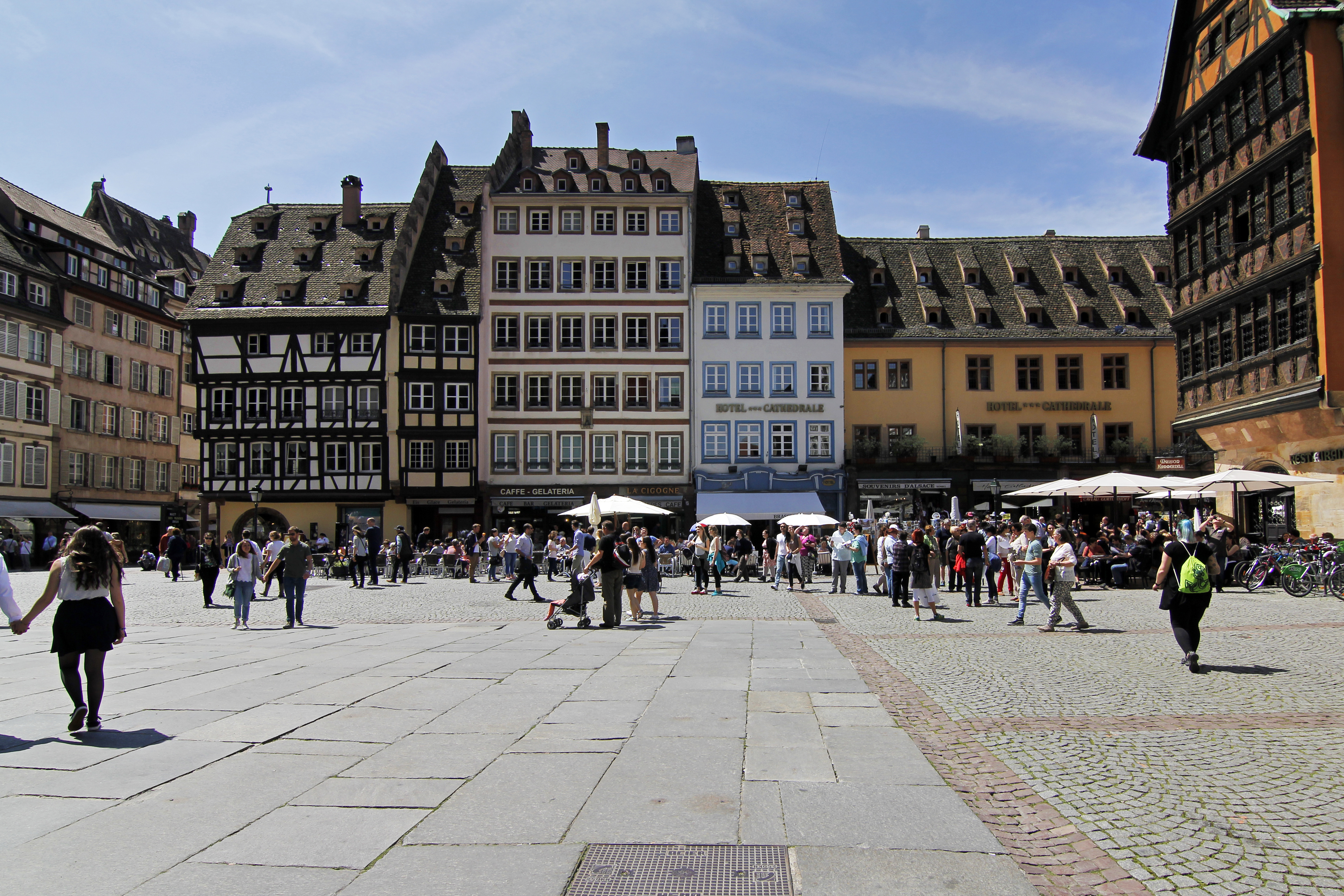
Looking west from the northern side of the cathedral. Maison Kammerzell is the yellow building on the right of the picture.
