= Alice von Pechmann =

German interior designer (1882-1976)

Alice von Pechmann (1882–1976) was a German interior designer specializing mostly in porcelain. Her work was produced by Meissen Porcelain Factory and the Royal Porcelain Manufactory in Berlin. Her work falls under Bauhaus style.

== Early life and education ==
Pechmann was born in 1882 to Moritz Hesse, a District Court Councilor, and Maria Hesse (née Pesch). She was raised Protestant, however, her upbringing was said to reflect the upper Jewish bourgeoisie's encouragement of women's pursual of education. She studied teacher training courses and from 1900 to 1901 studied in Berlin to pass her teaching examination for middle and high schools. In university, she studied medicine and continued her education in the field despite being married and starting a family with first husband, German city planner Werner Hegemann. In 1903, full matriculation rights for women was passed in Bavaria and Pechmann attended the University of Strasbourg until March 1906. Just six weeks after the birth of her daughter, Ellis, she requested to be admitted to the Ludwig-Maximilians-Universität München’s school of economics and philosophy on November 1, 1906.

== Marriages ==
In the early 1900s, Pechmann met her first husband Werner Hegemann during his military service in Brandenburg. After finishing her studies in Berlin, she returned to her parents’ home where she lived before marrying Hegemann. Hegemann spent the next years of their marriage on a lecture tour abroad which added strain to their relationship. After experiencing marital problems, the couple divorced in December 1911 and Pechmann returned to Munich. Her second husband was Günther von Pechmann, the president of the Royal Porcelain Manufactory (KPM), who she had met during her studies at the Ludwig-Maximilians-Universität München. They married in February 1918. It was through their marriage that she was introduced to a career in art and designed for the KPM.

== Exhibition ==
In 1958, Pechmann's Urbino Teacups were used in the 1958-1959 MoMA installation “20th Century Design”. The exhibit was dedicated to “useful objects” that focused on design and use over aesthetic, holding over 500 pieces of furniture, household accessories and machines. ”

== Bibliography ==
"Pechmann, Alice Freifrau von, Index entry". Deutsche Biographie. Retrieved November 30, 2020.

Flick, Caroline (2012). Werner Hegemann (1881–1936): Stadtplanung, Architektur, Politik - ein Arbeitsleben in Europa und den USA. Germany: De Gruyter.

"MoMA Press Release, NO. 85." The Museum of Modern Art, 17 Dec. 1958.

“The Fragility of Interwar Porcelain.” Chapter from Porcelain: A History from the Heart of Europe, by Suzanne L. Marchand, Princeton University Press, Princeton; Oxford, 2020, pp. 330–376. JSTOR, www.jstor.org/stable/j.ctvt9k0rk.15. Accessed 30 Nov. 2020.
