= Pharmacie du Cerf =

Oldest pharmacy in France

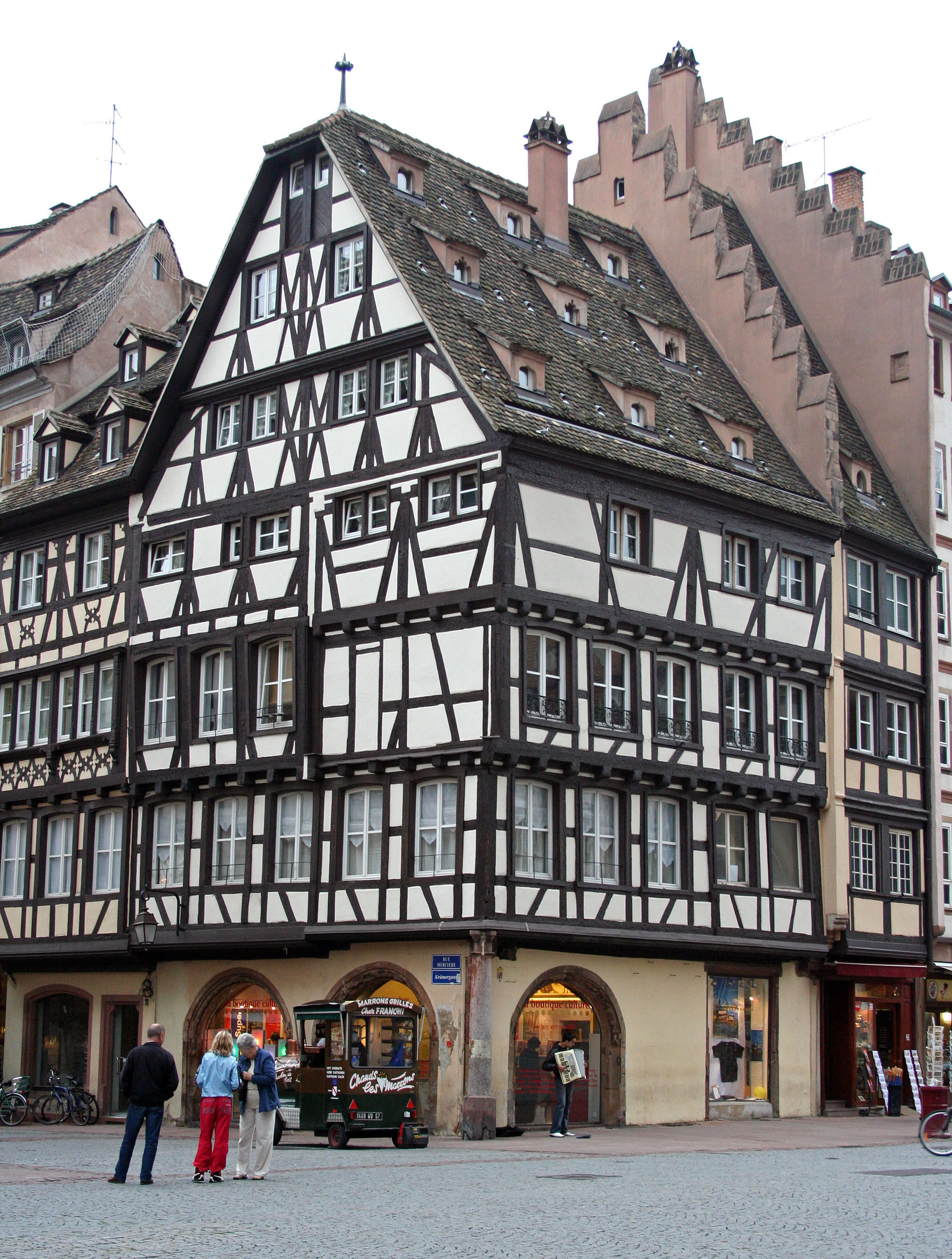
- The building in 2005, viewed from the Place de la Cathédrale
- Founded: 1268 (757 years ago)
- Headquarters: Strasbourg, Alsace, France
- Number of locations: 1 (2025)

Pharmacie du Cerf, in Strasbourg, Alsace, is the oldest pharmacy in France. It was established in 1268 (757 years ago).

== History ==
Dating to 1268, it stands at the corner of the Rue Mercière and the Place de la Cathédrale in the shadow of Strasbourg Cathedral. It has been classified as an historical monument since 1936.

A fire on 15 August 1268 resulted in the building being reconstructed, a process completed by 1300.

Between 1268 and 1398, the pharmacy was run by the Philippi family: Heinrich, his son Hesso and his grandson Hesselin. The property subsequently became a dwelling, and in 1432 it was occupied by Pope Pius II Aenas Sylvius Piccolomini.

The building was again destroyed by fire in 1466, and was rebuilt by 1469.

In 1497, the two separate properties which formed the corner were combined into one.

It became a pharmacy again in the early sixteenth century, but it is not known for how long.

The Spielmann family owned the house in the mid-seventeenth century.
