= Kammerzell House =

Medieval building in Strasbourg, France

Coordinates: 48°34′55″N 7°44′59″E

- Maison Kammerzell
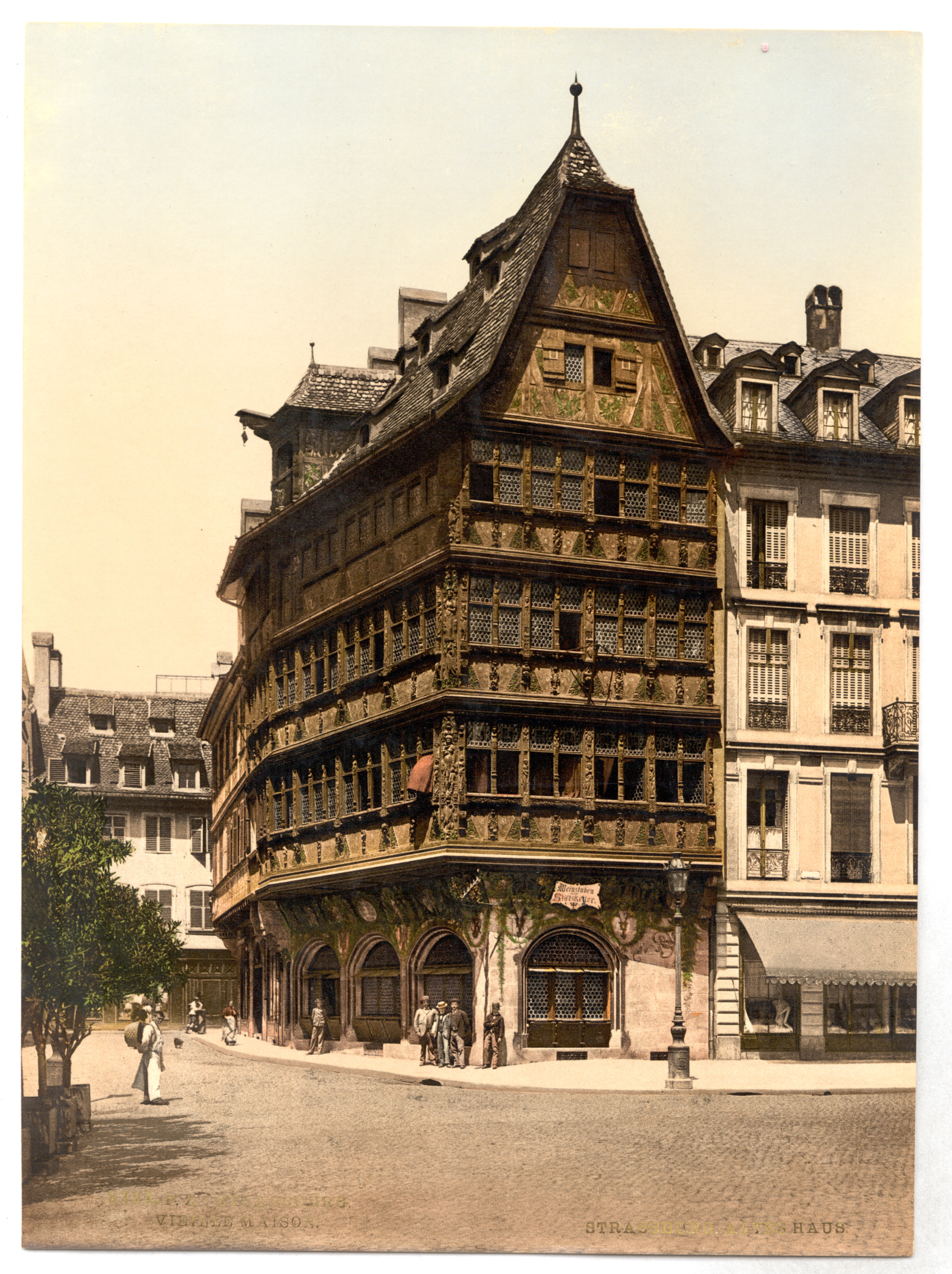
- A photomechanical print from around 1900

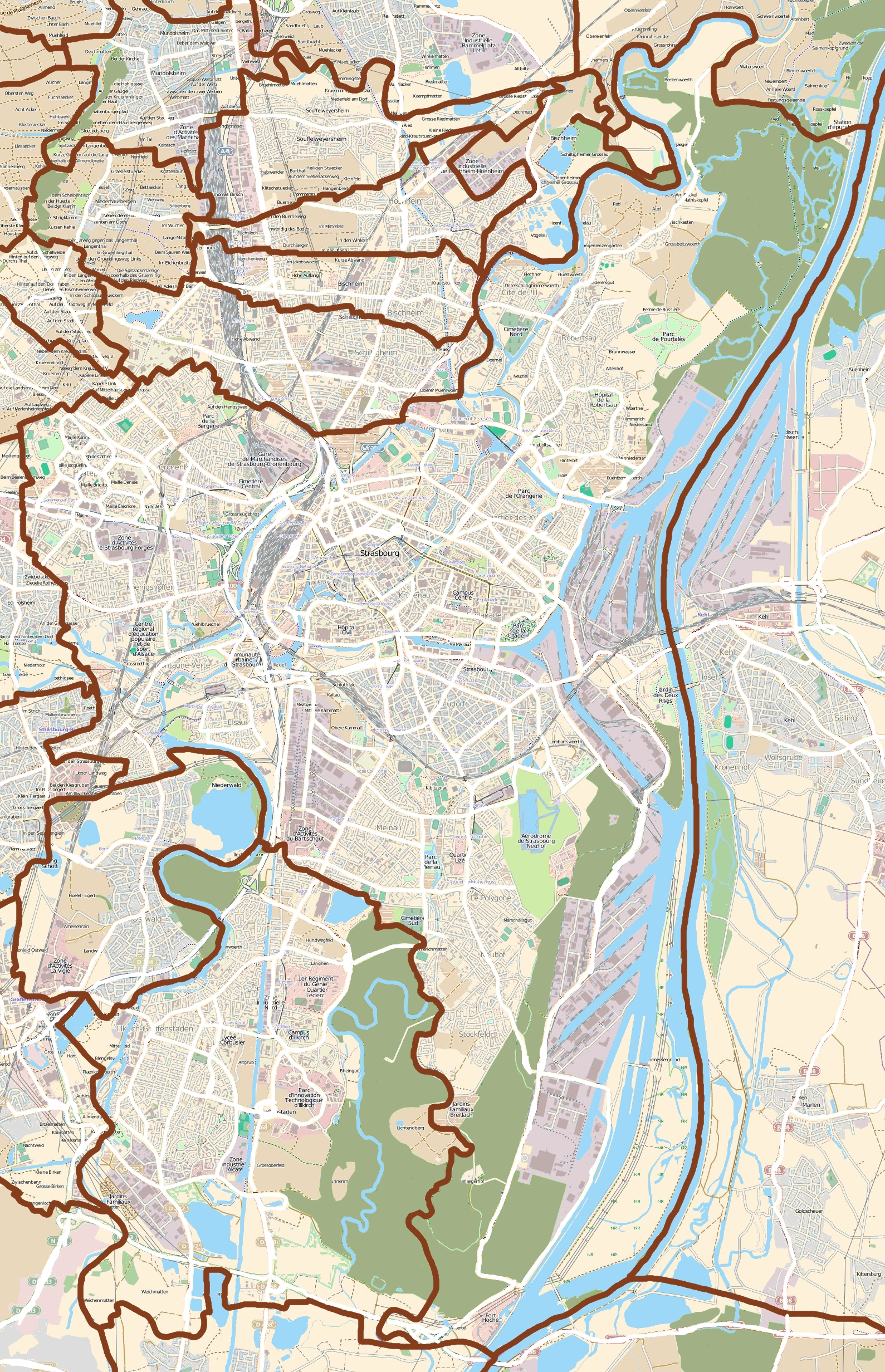
- Location within Strasbourg

General information
- Location: Strasbourg, France, Place de la Cathédrale
- Completed: 1427; 599 years ago

Technical details
- Floor count: 5

The Kammerzell House (Alsatian: Kammerzellhüs, French: Maison Kammerzell, German: Kammerzellhaus) is one of the most famous buildings of Strasbourg, France, and one of the most ornate and well-preserved medieval civil housing buildings in late-Gothic architecture in the areas formerly belonging to the Holy Roman Empire.

Built in 1427, but twice transformed, in 1467 and 1589, the building as it is now historically belongs to the German Renaissance but is stylistically still attached to the Rhineland black and white timber-framed style of civil (as opposed to administrative, clerical or noble) architecture.

It is situated on Place de la Cathédrale, north-west of Strasbourg Cathedral.

The building's interior has been decorated on all floors by lavish frescoes by Alsatian painter Léo Schnug (1878–1933). It now houses a restaurant.
