= ANSAC =

American corporation

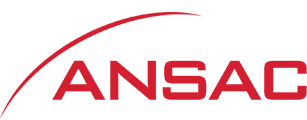
- Industry: Chemical Distribution
- Founded: 1984
- Headquarters: Westport, Connecticut, United States
- Area served: Worldwide
- Key people: Jeffrey Jacobson (President)
- Products: Natural soda ash
- Website: www.ansac.com

American Natural Soda Ash Corporation (ANSAC) operates as the international distribution arm for three US manufacturers of natural soda ash produced from trona deposits in Green River, Wyoming, the trade name for sodium carbonate Na_{2}CO_{3}, is an essential raw material used in the manufacture of glass, detergents, and several sodium-based chemicals.

The company is headquartered in Westport, Connecticut.

== History ==
ANSAC was founded in 1984 as the American Natural Soda Ash Corporation. The company was set up to act as the international sales, marketing and distribution cooperative for the four leading producers of natural soda ash in the United States.

=== Soda ash commodity ===
Soda ash is one of the most widely used and important commodities in the United States, contributing substantially to the gross domestic product For this reason, the Federal Reserve Board incorporates monthly soda ash production data into monthly economic indicators used to monitor the condition of the US economy.

The USA is the world’s largest exporter of soda ash and exported over 5 million tonnes in 2008, which accounted for over 50% of the world’s trade in this commodity.

=== ANSAC today ===
ANSAC ships soda ash to all areas of the globe except North America and Western Europe. In these areas, the member companies use their own sales and distribution services. Its estimated export volume in 2008 was 4 million tonnes, up from around 3 million tonnes in 2000. These volumes make the company the world's largest exporter of natural soda ash.

The soda ash is moved from the plants in Wyoming in a fleet of 4000 rail cars or 40 unit trains to ANSAC’s dedicated ocean terminals in Portland, Oregon and Port Arthur, Texas.

ANSAC has 6 dedicated vessels, including the ANSAC Kathryn, ANSAC Asia, ANSAC Sesoda, ANSAC Splendor, Jasmine Ace & King Yukon. The company also uses other vessel chartering arrangements to supply customers all around the world.

- The Portland terminal is used to supply customers located in the west coast of Latin & Central America, the Middle-East & Asia
- The Port Arthur terminal is used to supply customers located in the east coast of Latin & Central America, the Caribbean, Africa, & Eastern Europe

=== Member companies ===
The two leading US manufacturers supplying ANSAC with natural soda ash are:

- WE Soda
- TATA Chemicals (Soda Ash) Partners

These companies mine and process trona into soda ash in the Green River Basin, Wyoming This area contains the largest reserves of naturally occurring trona on earth, with deposits estimated at 100 billion tons The mines and processing plants operate 24 hours per day, year-round Soda ash production is an economic mainstay of the communities of southwest Wyoming, contributing over $300 million annually.

During the processing and production of soda ash, a number of other sodium compounds are made as co-products, including sodium bicarbonate baking soda, sodium sulfite, sodium tripolyphosphate, and chemical caustic soda.

== Products ==
Soda ash is made in three main grades - light, medium and dense. These have the same chemical properties and only differ in physical characteristics, such as bulk density and particle size and shape.

ANSAC supplies dense and medium dense soda ash:

=== Dense soda ash ===
The dense soda ash exported by ANSAC has the following properties:

- Particle size - <75 micrometres
- High sodium carbonate content – Purity levels of at least 99.2% and typically 99.8%
- Low impurity levels – chloride and iron

Fifty percent of the world-wide production of soda ash is earmarked for soda-lime silica glass manufacture, generally used in the flat glass (automotive and construction), glass container (food and drink), and many other glass industries. The bulk of ANSAC dense soda ash is supplied to this industry.

=== Medium dense soda ash ===
The medium dense soda ash exported by ANSAC has the following properties:

- Particle size - 150 micrometres 75%
- High sodium carbonate content – Purity levels of at least 99.2% and typically 99.8%
- Low impurity levels – chloride and iron

Medium dense soda ash dissolves faster than dense soda ash and is typically used as an alternative to Chemical synthesis/synthetic light soda ash in compact detergent manufacture

== Environmental record ==
Trona is 1 part soda ash, 1 part sodium bicarbonate and 3 parts water The production of soda ash is a process of physical separation It is free from organics, heavy metals and other materials harmful to humans and animals The production of soda ash from trona uses far less water, energy and produces far less CO_{2} than any synthetic method of production for soda ash There are no harmful waste of other effluents released into the environment Natural trona-based soda ash is considered the purest and greenest soda ash available ANSAC has no citations from the United States Environmental Protection Agency or any other environmental group

== Legal ==
Overall, ANSAC was challenged for causing anticompetitive conduct in the European Union, South Africa and India. In the European Union it was found in violation of EU Competition Law. In South Africa it settled the case. In India, it prevailed.

- ANSAC hit by $1 M fine and ban in South Africa

American Natural Soda Ash Corp ANSAC has agreed to pay a fine of $1 M to settle a price fixing case filed by Botswana Ash Ltd Botash and Chemserve Technical Products Ltd with South Africa's Competition Commission The company acknowledged its participation in the price fixing and also agreed to halt exports in its present state ANSAC will continue to supply soda ash for a short period of time before completely withdrawing from South Africa The price fixing case, which started on 26 Oct 1999, accused ANSAC and its acting agent in South Africa, CHC Global Ltd, of violating the Competitions Act
