= Grueneberg ganglion =

The Grueneberg ganglion (GG), also written as Grüneberg ganglion is an olfactory subsystem located at the entrance of the nasal cavity of rodents. It was first described by Hans Grüneberg in 1973.

It is mainly implicated in the detection of volatile compounds signaling danger as the alarm pheromones emitted by stressed conspecifics, but also by several categories of kairomones emitted by the urine of predatory carnivores. The detection of these compounds by the Grueneberg ganglion induces fear-behaviors in the receiver.

The Grueneberg ganglion is also activated by cold temperatures.

== See also ==
- Pheromone
- Olfaction
