= Chemische Fabrik Kalk =

German chemicals company

Coordinates: 50°56′27″N 6°59′45″E

Chemische Fabrik Kalk GmbH
- Type: GmbH
- Industry: formerly chemicals today wholesale of chemicals
- Founded: 1 November 1858
- Founder: Hermann Julius Grüneberg,
- Headquarters: Cologne, Germany
- Website: www.cfk-gmbh.com

Chemische Fabrik Kalk (CFK) (lit. Chemical Factory Kalk) was a German chemicals company based in Kalk, a city district of Cologne. The company was founded in 1858 as Chemische Fabrik Vorster & Grüneberg, Cöln by Julius Vorster and Hermann Julius Grüneberg and was renamed to Chemische Fabrik Kalk GmbH in 1892. At times the company was the second-largest German producer of soda ash and was, with almost 2400 employees, one of the largest employers in Cologne. For decades the chimneys and the water tower of the factory dominated the skyline of Cologne-Kalk.

In 1960, the company was acquired by the Salzdetfurth AG, which was later renamed into Kali und Salz (nowadays K+S) and became a subsidiary of BASF. All production facilities of the former Chemische Fabrik Kalk were closed in 1993, and the name Chemische Fabrik Kalk since then exists only as the name of a wholesale subsidiary of K+S. The factory was demolished and after the decontamination of the premises the new Cologne police departments headquarters and the Köln Arcaden shopping mall were built on the former factory premises.

== History ==
=== Chemiewerk Vorster & Grüneberg (1858–1891) ===
On 1 November 1858, the merchant Julius Vorster and the chemist and pharmacist Hermann Julius Grüneberg, who was a doctoral student at that time, founded the Chemische Fabrik Vorster & Grüneberg, Cöln. Vorster, who had owned a chemical factory before, contributed 15,000 Thaler and Grüneberg contributed 5,000 Thaler. The latter also developed a technology to industrialize the process of decomposing mutually equivalent amounts of potassium carbonate and sodium nitrate which was discussed by chemists since 1840s.

As a location for the new factory they chose what was then the small village of Kalk (incorporated into Cologne in 1910) on the right bank of the Rhine. After purchasing the premises of the former iron foundry Biber & Berger construction began and three months later, in February 1859, production started. The factory produced potassium nitrate and as a byproduct sodium carbonate (also known as soda ash). Potassium nitrate was used in food preservation and in the production of black powder. The potassium nitrate was produced from Russian potash and nitratine. From 1859 to 1864, production of potassium nitrate increased from 250 metric tons (280 short tons) to 2,400 metric tons (2,600 short tons). In the first year the factory employed ten workers.

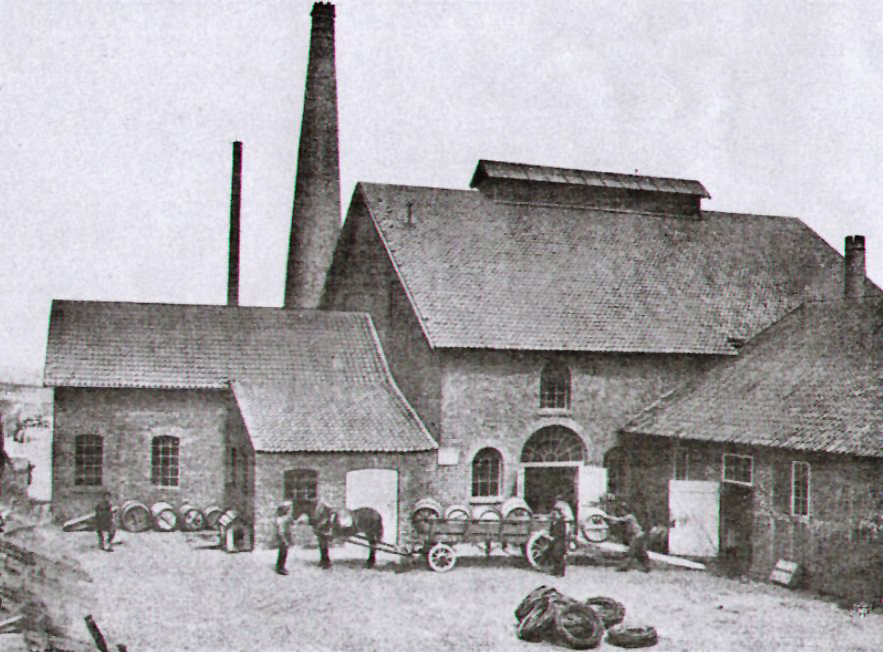
Chemische Fabrik Kalk in 1859.

As the new company flourished several adjacent lots were purchased in 1860 to expand the production facilities and to maintain the regional market leadership in potassium nitrate. With prices for Russian potash increasing, the factory began to use a by-product of the sugar production from sugar beet. In 1860 the factory also began to produce sodium chloride, which was crystallized from rock salt.

To secure a supply of rock salt the factory founders Vorster and Grüneberg acquired a salt mine in Staßfurt near Magdeburg. The area was known for its deposits of a double salt, a compound of potassium chloride and magnesium chloride named carnallite after its discoverer, the Prussian mining engineer Rudolf von Carnall. The new salt mine Vorster & Grüneberg was rich in deposits of carnallite. Grüneberg developed a new chemical process to produce potassium chloride from carnallite. Initially the carnallite was transported from Staßfurt to Kalk where it was dissolved in a current of stream and after cooling down the carnallite crystallized to obtain potassium chloride. To reduce transport costs the two founders decided to build two potassium chloride factories in Staßfurt and Leopoldshall where they had acquired a second salt mine.

In 1860, Grüneberg finished his doctoral studies and received a Ph.D. from the University of Leipzig. His research was in the field of agricultural chemistry, in particular mineral fertilizers. In 1864, the factory began the production of the fertilizer superphosphate, produced from phosphorite from a newly acquired mine in Nassau an der Lahn. One year later the production of the fertilizer ammonium sulfate begins. In 1866, the factory begins to use the Leblanc process to produce potassium carbonate from sodium chloride. During the Centennial Exposition in Philadelphia in 1876, the company was awarded a gold medal for having first manufactured Potash and Potash salts, according to Leblanc's process, on a manufacturing scale, and for the purity of the products exhibited.

The company continued to expand, with a factory producing ammonium sulfate opening in 1865, in Raderberg near Cologne (incorporated into Cologne in 1888). This factory produced the ammonium sulfate from ammonia and sulfuric acid, the former a waste product of the production of town gas. As the new factory was highly profitable, Vorster & Grüneberg opened new ammonium sulfate factories in Nippes, Cologne (incorporated into Cologne in 1888), Düsseldorf, Essen, Dortmund, Hamburg, Leipzig and Saint Petersburg and an ammonium chloride factory in Moscow.

Chemische Fabrik Kalk in 1892.

In 1867, the company incurred financial losses from a bad investment in the United Kingdom and declining demand for its products. In the same year Julius Vorster Jr., the son of the founder Julius Vorster, became involved in the management of the company. On his recommendation the company began to produce magnesium sulfate in order to reduce the losses. Magnesium sulfate was primarily intended for the export to the United Kingdom, where it was used as a drying agent in the textile industry. The new product and an improving market for potassium nitrate helped the company to overcome the financial crisis in 1870. In 1871, the potassium chloride factory in Staßfurt was closed. On 1 October 1875, the second son of Vorster, the chemist Fritz Vorster joined the company as technical director. After the death of the founder Julius Vorster on 10 October 1876, the new owners converted the company into a limited partnership (Kommanditgesellschaft).

In 1878, Carl Scheibler became the head of the fertilizer department. Scheibler introduced an inexpensive fertilizer known as Thomas phosphate. This fertilizer was based on Thomas slag, named after Sidney Gilchrist Thomas. This new, inexpensive fertilizer allowed even poor farmers to fertilize their fields. At the same time municipalities began to use the waste products of the production of town gas for themselves or were selling them for profits, forcing Vorster & Grüneberg to gradually close their ammonium sulfate factories at other locations over the next fifteen years. In contrast, the factory in Kalk continued its expansion with new production facilities for sulfuric acid and nitric acid opening in 1881. In 1885, Carl Scheibler founded his own company, Düngerfabrik C. Scheibler & Co, with the participation of the owners of Vorster & Grüneberg. This company produced Thomas phosphate and other fertilizers in domestic and international production facilities.

=== Chemische Fabrik Kalk GmbH (1892–1945) ===
On 24 May 1892, the Vorster & Grüneberg Kommanditgesellschaft was renamed into Chemische Fabrik Kalk GmbH (CFK) and converted into a company with limited liability (GmbH). It was one of the first limited liabilities companies in the German Empire as the law on companies with limited liabilities was adopted only one month earlier. On 7 June 1894, the last surviving founder Hermann Julius Grüneberg dies. His son Richard Grüneberg succeeds him and joins the management board of the company. After 1900, the production of potassium carbonate ceased due to competitive pressure. Instead, the company began to produce sodium carbonate using the Solvay process. In 1902, the Düngerfabrik C. Scheibler & Co. was incorporated, and a year later the last remaining factory in the Staßburg region, the potassium chloride factory in Leopolshall was sold. To guarantee the water supply in the main factory in Kalk a water tower with an integrated chimney and a height of 43.6 metres (143 ft) was built. This water tower should dominate the skyline of Kalk for the next one hundred years.

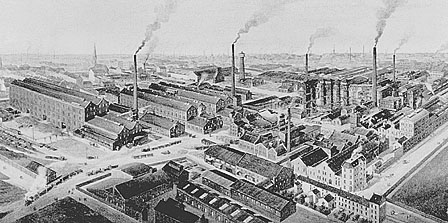
Chemische Fabrik Kalk in 1908.

At the fiftieth anniversary of the founding of the company on 1 November 1908, the Chemische Fabrik Kalk produced the following chemicals: ammonium hydroxide, ammonium chloride, ammonia, sodium hydroxide, sodium sulfate, nitric acid, hydrochloric acid, sulfuric acid, sodium carbonate and various fertilizers. Apart from the main factory in Kalk the company operated an ammonia factory in Cologne-Nippes and fertilizer factories in Cologne-Ehrenfeld and Euskirchen. The company was also one of the owners of the coal distillation plant Ammonium GmbH in Weitmar near Bochum and held interests in domestic and international Thomas steel mills producing slag. Total production of all chemicals combined was 600,000 metric tons (660,000 short tons). In 1908, the company employed more than 1200 workers.

With the outbreak of World War I employment fell to 70 workers and parts of production were shut down, as the company was not producing essential chemicals for the war economy. Management then concentrated on the production of saltpeter, a raw material for explosives. Due to the importance of the chemical the workforce increased to 504 employees in December 1914. In 1916, an explosives research laboratory was created, and a short time afterwards the first explosive agent was developed. Despite the lack of workers the company also expanded into the new market for animal food by treating straw with sodium hydroxide.

After the end of the war the treaty of Versailles forced Chemische Werke Kalk to end the production of explosives and close the research laboratory. In the 1920s, demand for fertilizers slowly increased, but was accompanied by an increase in prices for raw materials. To mitigate the effect of the price increases the company began to produce a fertilizer based on ammonium nitrate and calcium carbonate, two by-products of the production of other fertilizers. In 1930, Scheibler’s Kampdünger (Kamp standing for Kalk-Ammon-Phospor, i.e. lime-ammonium-phosphorus and Dünger being the German word for fertilizer) was introduced, a two-component fertilizer that was readily accepted by the market. The company management at this time considered moving the factory from Kalk to Godorf in Rodenkirchen as the high population density made expansion of the factory difficult. Ultimately this plan was not implemented.

After the Hitler's rise to power in 1933, the company gradually began to concentrate on raw materials for the production of explosives. Since 1937, women were employed as workers. After the outbreak of World War II, with the male workforce in military service, women were conscripted for work at the company. Since 1940, Chemische Fabrik Kalk used approximately 460 forced laborers from Poland and later the Soviet Union. The factory was heavily damaged during the bombing raids which started in 1942. In 1943, the sulfuric acid plant was completely destroyed, a year later almost all of the production came to a standstill. On 6 March 1945, the grandson of the founder, Fritz Vorster Jr. closed the factory after 80 percent of the production facilities had been destroyed. At this time the company had only 100 employees.

=== Acquisition by Salzdetfurth AG and factory closing (1945–1993) ===
In August 1945, only three months after the end of the war the Chemische Fabrik Kalk began to produce burnt lime for the purpose of bartering. Workers returning from war captivity cannibalized some sections of the plant to repair other sections. Some equipment and tools that were removed from the factory before the bombing raids were returned. In March 1946, the production of ammonium sulfate resumed. In 1947, large parts of the factory were rebuilt and in the summer of 1948 production of superphosphate in September 1948, production of Kampdünger resumed. As potash was added to the Kampdünger it was sold as KAMPKA-Dünger (the ending KA standing for Kalisalz, the German word for potash). In 1950, the production of the company had reached the old pre-war production level and the company had a market share of 20 percent of the German market for sodium carbonate, although it decreased to 13 percent one year later. During this time the management again considered a move of the factory from Kalk to Godorf, but after a study concluded that a moving the factory would be more costly than staying in Kalk the already purchased land in Godorf was sold. In 1952, the Salzdetfurth AG acquired a 25 percent share of Chemische Fabrik Kalk and increased the share to 75 percent in 1957.

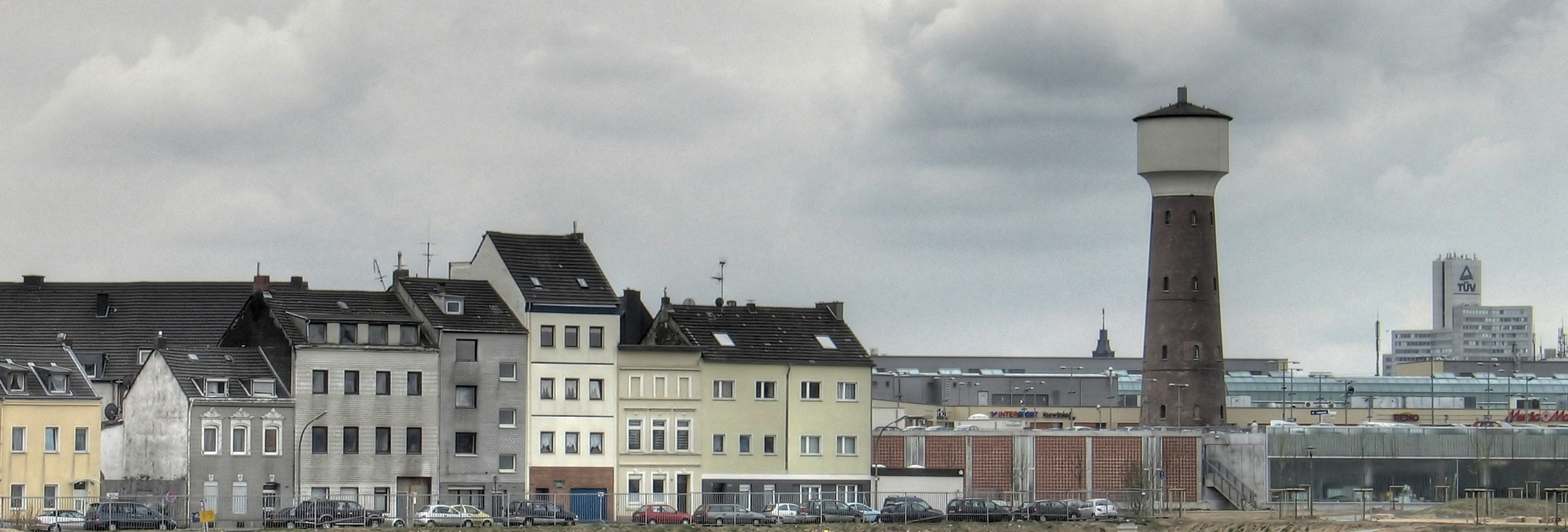
The former water tower of Chemische Fabrik Kalk in 2007

At the centennial anniversary of the founding of the company on 1 November 1958, the company employed 1820 workers and 549 salaried professionals. A new production facility for phosphates was opened in 1960. In the same year, the factory produced 417,000 metric tons (460,000 short tons) of KAMPKA fertilizer and 170,000 metric tons (190,000 short tons) of sodium carbonate. In 1960, the Salzdetfurth AG acquired the remaining 25 percent of Chemische Fabrik Kalk. After the takeover the Salzdetfurth AG began to modernize the production facilities and build for example a new, 120 metres (390 ft) tall chimney that helped alleviate the odor pollution from sulfurous exhaust fumes. In the mid 1960s, the fillings and loading plants were converted to fully automated operation. Despite these modernizations the factory equipment, in particular the sodium carbonate production facilities were outdated. The company also lacked new products that would have allowed the company to enter new markets.

In 1971, the Salzdetfurth AG merged with the BASF subsidiary Wintershall and the Burbach-Kaliwerke AG. One year later the Salzdetfurth AG and Burbach-Kaliwerke AG and the sodium carbonate production facilities of Wintershall were merged into the new Kali und Salz AG. Under the new ownership Chemische Fabrik Kalk expanded into the production of flower and garden fertilizers. In 1974, the factory had 1800 employees, had a revenue of 400 million DM and was active in the production of sodium carbonate, calcium chloride, fine chemicals, phosphate for animal feed and fertilizers.

In the early 1980s, the factory tried to enter new markets with the production of bromine, but closed production after a fire destroyed the production facility only two weeks after completion in 1985. Due to increasing competition in the market for fertilizers and the lack of new products, company revenue fell from 570 million DM in 1985, to 370 million DM. The company posted increasing financial losses, partly due to its locational disadvantage as all raw materials and all final goods had to be transported by truck from the factory to Cologne's Rhine harbor. Another disadvantage was the location of the factory in a densely populated residential area and a decreasing acceptance of the pollution caused by the factory. Without operating profits a relocation of the factory was not feasible, and thus, without any prospects, the fertilizer production was shut down in 1989. Employment fell from 1400 employees in 1985 to 830 in 1990, with the factory only producing sodium carbonate, calcium chloride and phosphate for animal feed. Although losses were reduced to almost zero in 1990, the financial situation deteriorated in 1992 when the prices for sodium carbonate fell. The fall in prices was partly due to the lifting of anti-dumping on sodium carbonate imports from the American Natural Soda Ash Corporation (ANSAC) by the European Commission. Another factor in the worsening financial situation was an antitrust fine of US$1.38 million imposed by the European commission for participating in a sodium carbonate cartel together with Solvay and Imperial Chemical Industries. Company revenue fell to 225 million DM and losses increased to 9.6 million DM. On 23 December 1993 all remaining production was shut down and all remaining 700 workers were laid off. Since then Chemische Fabrik Kalk GmbH is the name of a wholesale distributor of chemicals and subsidiary of K+S AG (named Kali und Salz AG until 1999). Company revenue in 2007 was 7.86 million Euro, down from 10.07 million Euro in 2004.

=== Demolition and redevelopment of the factory site (1993–today) ===
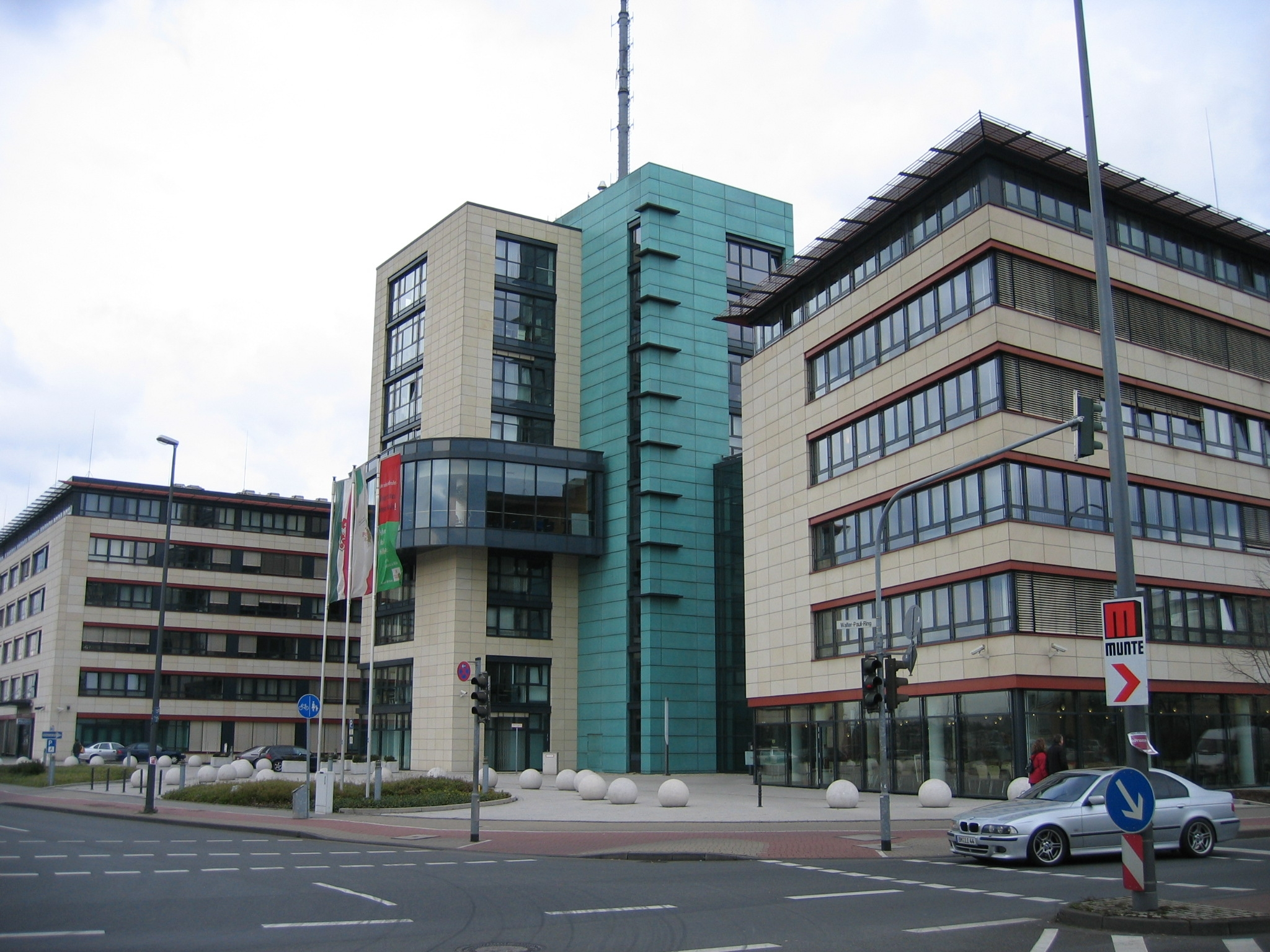
The new Cologne police department headquarters.

After the factory was closed all production facilities and factory buildings on the almost 40 hectares (99 acres) large premises were demolished. A small laboratory building and the water tower which had been listed as a historic landmark were preserved. The former office buildings on the southern side of the factory premises were sold. Equipment was sold to other factories, in for example Poland and Brazil. In October 1994, the tall chimney was blasted. The last building demolished was the fertilizer factory building dating from 1894 which is torn down in March 2001. As the premises were heavily contaminated with sulfur and heavy metals they had to be decontaminated from 1996 to 2001. New streets and an access road to the Zoobrücke, a Rhine bridge were built. In 2003, the new Cologne police department headquarters were opened. In 2005, the Köln Arcaden shopping mall opened, with the parking garage build around the historic water tower. Plans to open a Chemische Fabrik Kalk museum in the water tower have not been realized. In April 2009, the science center Odysseum will open, which will be the largest science center in Germany. Other planned projects include residential and office buildings, retail space and an urban park. The former factory site is today known under the official name Cityforum Kalk, or abbreviated CFK.

== Bibliography ==
- Brügelmann, Walther (2004), Dr. Hermann Julius Grüneberg — Lebenswerk (in German), archived from the original on 2010-02-27
- Bützler, Heinrich (2001), Geschichte von Kalk und Umgebung. Nachdruck nach dem Original von 1910 (in German) (Edition Kalk ed.), Cologne: Buchhandlung W. Ohlert, ISBN 3-935735-00-6
- Jahrbuch für Geschichte und Landeskunde, Band 32 (2007), Die chemische Fabrik Kalk (in German), Cologne: Geschichts-und Heimatverein Rechtsrheinisches Köln
- Greiling, Walter (1958), 100 Jahre Chemische Fabrik Kalk 1858–1958 (in German), Cologne: Chemische Fabrik Kalk
- Bilz, Fritz (1997), Veränderung der Industriearbeit in Köln-Kalk (in German) (Edition Kalk ed.), Cologne: Buchhandlung W. Ohlert, ISBN 3-935735-02-2
- Pohl, Stefan; Georg Möhlich (2000), Das rechtsrheinische Köln. Seine Geschichte von der Antike bis zur Gegenwart (in German), Cologne: Wienand Verlag, ISBN 3-87909-391-1
- Prüfer, Thomas; Reder, Dirk; Roeseling, Severin (2006), Wachstum erleben — Die Geschichte der K+S Gruppe (PDF) (in German), Kassel: K+S Aktiengesellschaft, ISBN 3-9809738-1-6, archived from the original (PDF) on 2008-11-19
- Roeseling, Georg (2003), Zwischen Rhein und Berg – Die Geschichte von Kalk, Vingst, Humboldt/Gremberg, Höhenberg (in German), Cologne: Bachem Verlag, ISBN 3-7616-1623-6
- Freiherr von Teuffel, Heinrich (2004), Dr. Hermann Julius Grüneberg — Zeittafel (in German), archived from the original on 2010-03-04
