= Hermann Julius Grüneberg =

German chemist and inventor (1827–1894)

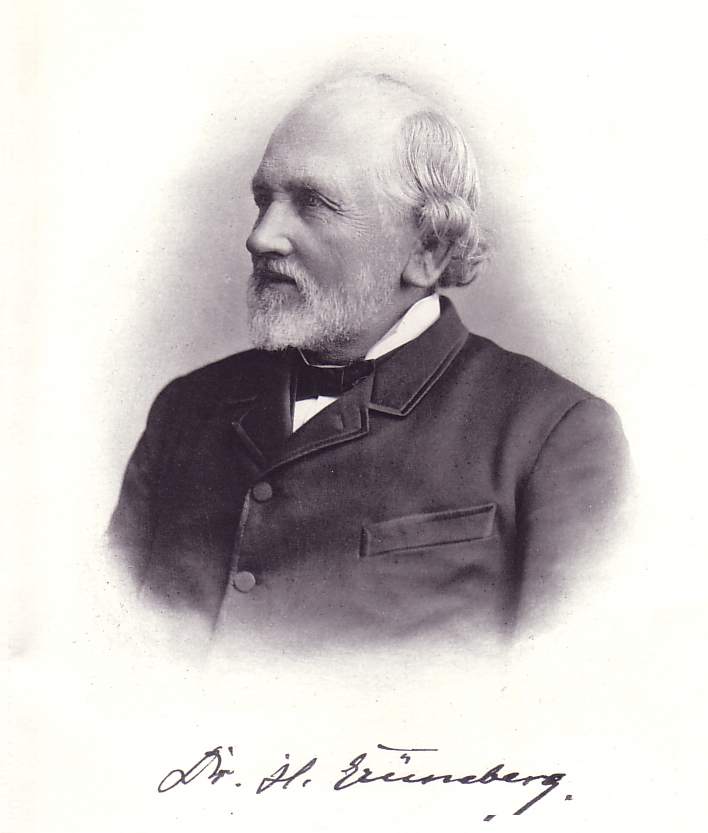
Hermann Julius Grüneberg.

Hermann Julius Grüneberg (11 April 1827 – 7 June 1894) was a German chemist and inventor, and together with Julius Vorster the founder of the Chemische Fabrik Kalk.

== Biography ==
Grüneberg was born on 11 April 1827 in Stettin, Province of Pomerania, Prussia, now Szczecin, the capital city of West Pomeranian Voivodeship in Poland. He was the second of six children of the master organ builder August Wilhelm Grüneberg and his wife Caroline Henriette née Breslich from Cammin. One of his brothers was Barnim Grüneberg, who took over his father's organ building business. He died on 7 June 1894 in Cologne, German Empire where he was buried in the Melaten Cemetery.

== Honours ==
A school, the Grüneberg-Schule, and a street, Grünebergstraße, in Kalk, a district of Cologne, are named after him.

== See also ==
- Chemische Fabrik Kalk
- Julius Vorster

== Bibliography ==
- Dornheim, Andreas (2006), Walther Brügelmann (ed.), Forschergeist und Unternehmermut — Der Kölner Chemiker und Industrielle Hermann Julius Grüneberg (1827–1894) (in German), Cologne: Böhlau Verlag, ISBN 3-412-03006-6
