= Julius Vorster =

German-chemist (1809–1876)

Julius Vorster (29 April 1809, Hamm – 10 October 1876, Cologne) was a German entrepreneur, one of the founders of Chemische Fabrik Kalk, a major German chemical enterprise in Cologne.

== Life ==
Frederick Julius Vorster was the son of Johannes Vorster (1758 - 1853) and Anna Marie Eleonore Proebsting (1777 - 1826). After a commercial apprenticeship, he opened a chemical business in Cologne. The business thrived, and Voster entered into a partnership with Harhaus, renaming the business Vorster and Harhaus. On 1 November 1858 Vorster and chemist Hermann Julius Grüneberg, who was a doctoral student at that time, founded Chemische Fabrik Kalk. The successful company expanded under the leadership of Vorster's sons Julius Vorster Jr. and Fritz Vorster, and Hermann Grüneberg's son Richard Grüneberg.

Vorster married Wilhelmine Röhrig and they had several children. He was the founder of the Evangelical hospital in Cologne. He is buried on the Melaten-Friedhof.

== See also ==
- Chemische Fabrik Kalk
- Hermann Julius Grüneberg
