= Washington Highlands Historic District =

Historic district in Wisconsin, United States

- U.S. National Register of Historic Places
- U.S. Historic district
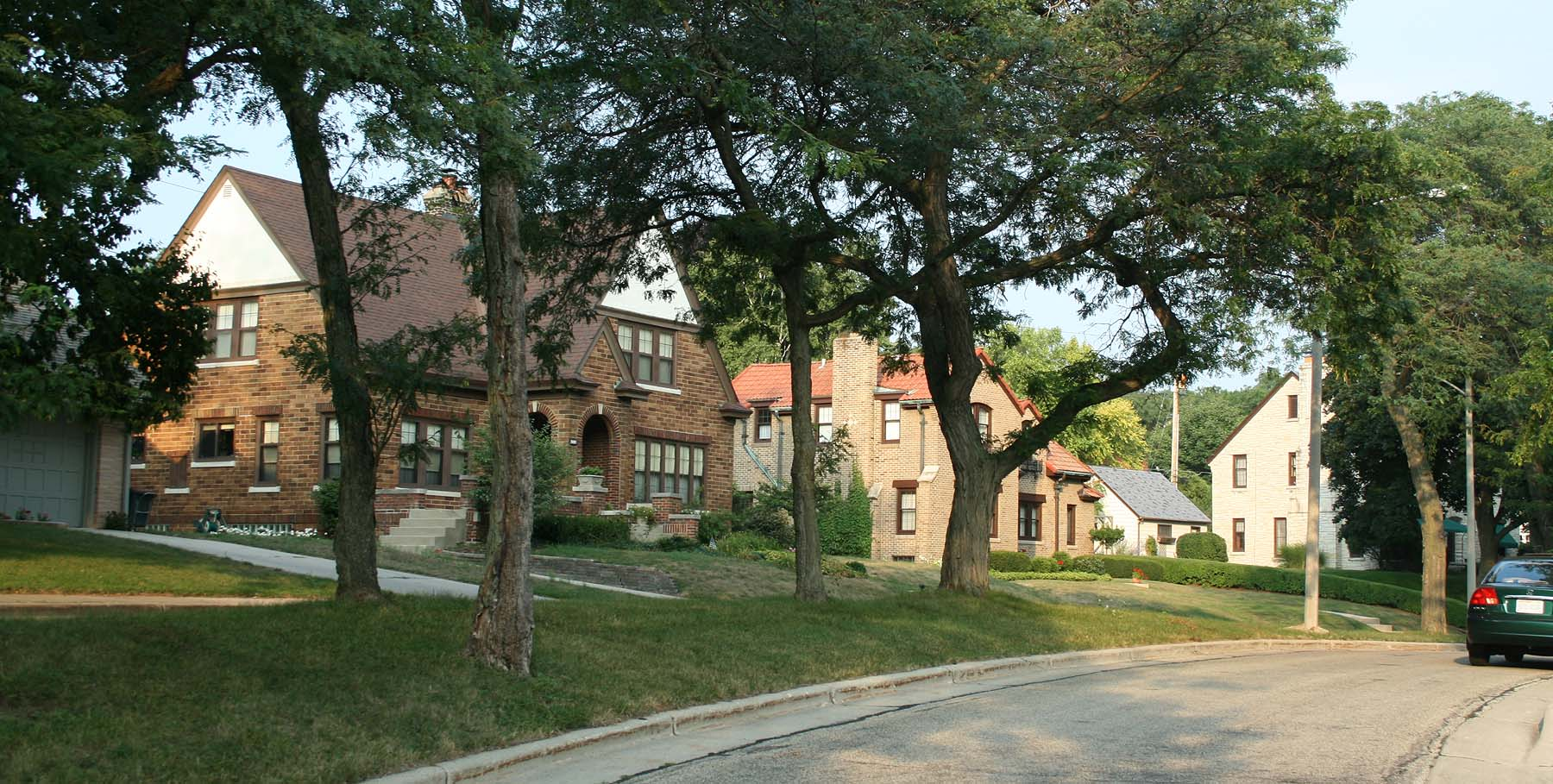
- Washington Highlands Historic District
- Location: Wauwatosa, Wisconsin
- Coordinates: 43.05298°N 87.99094°W
- NRHP reference No.: 89002121
- Added to NRHP: December 18, 1989

The Washington Highlands Historic District is a historic subdivision in Wauwatosa, Wisconsin, planned by Hegemann & Peets starting in 1916. It was added to the National Register of Historic Places in 1989.

The Washington Highlands has a rich history and is known for its large, unique, and stately homes. The Historic District is bordered by 68th Street, 60th Street, Milwaukee Avenue, and Lloyd Street.

== History ==
The land the district now sits on was once owned by Frederick Pabst, the founder of Pabst Brewing Company. After Pabst's death, the land was platted for subdivisions. In 1916, Werner Hegemann and his firm designed the neighborhood that would become the district. Influenced by the garden city movement, their design preserved natural features like Schoonmaker Creek and parklands, and emphasized the natural terrain with curving streets.

The neighborhood was the first in the Milwaukee area to adopt formal racial covenant exclusionary restrictions enforcing white-only residences. In 1919, the subdivision imposed the covenant that cited "at no time shall the land included in Washington Highlands or any part thereof, or any building thereon be purchased, owned, leased or occupied by any person other than of white race." Exceptions were possible for domestic servants.

Further, financial institutions further aligned this segregation through redlining following guidelines of the Federal Housing Administration and Home Owners' Loan Corporation (HOLC) which designated the new subdivision as green or “Grade A” as a “highly restricted and exclusive area,” which prevented Black and other non-white applicants from being approved for home loans in the area. The federal government justified these rules enforcing segregation, which were enacted nationally, as protecting property values and reducing “credit risk” from the “infiltration of inharmonious racial groups.” A HOLC brochure in the period noted Washington Highlands “permits a wide latitude of discrimination in accepting residents,” which was considered an attractive feature.

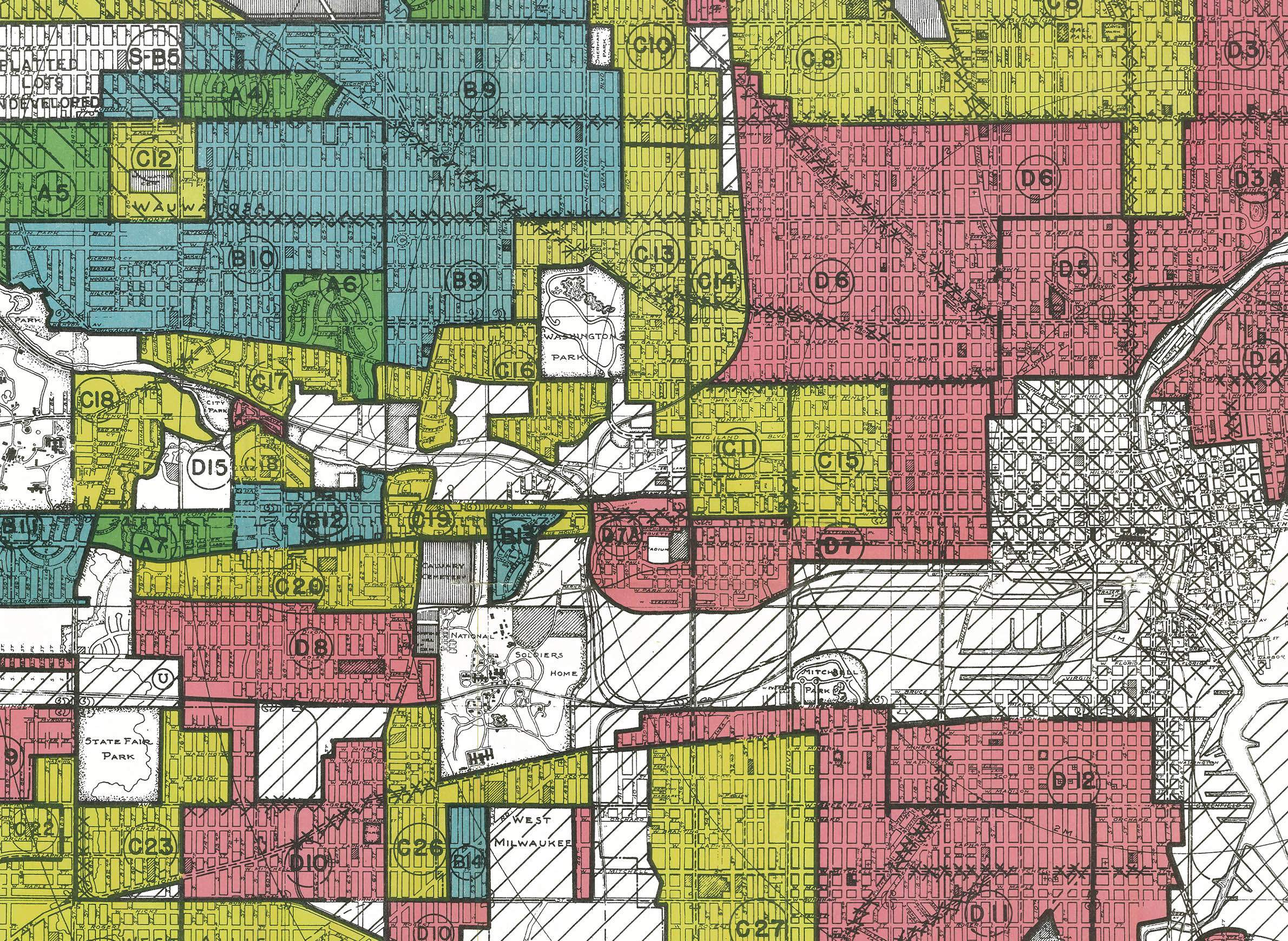
Washington Highlands, listed as A6, was one of few neighborhoods in region marked as “green” to encourage whites-only redlining. Source: US National Archives

These restrictions remained in place until it was made illegal by the federal Fair Housing Act of 1968, which was supported locally by the 1967-1968 Open Housing housing marches led by the Milwaukee chapter of NAACP Youth Council, Vel R. Phillips, and James Groppi. However, the legacy of these practices continue to the present, as the neighborhood’s demographics have remained fairly consistently homogenous, with 87% of residents being white as of 2020 US Census. The broader metropolitan area consistently ranks as one of the most racially-segregated in the United States.

In 2025, the Washington Homes Association revised the subdivision's covenants, deleting the racial restriction in its entirety.

The district was added to the National Register of Historic Places in 1989, as well as designated a Wauwatosa Landmark in 1991.

== Architectural styles ==
The NRHP historic district is large, including 323 contributing structures in various styles. Here are some examples:

- The Kamm house at 6426 Upper Parkway North is a Dutch Colonial Revival home built in 1919. The gambrel roof is the hallmark of this style. Conrad Kamm was a grain merchant, and the Kamms were the second family to move into Washington Highlands.
- The house at 6440 Upper Parkway North is a 2-story Prairie School house built in 1919, with horizontal lines, wide eaves, a hip roof, and arrays of windows.
- The house at 6129 Washington Circle is a 1.5-story Craftsman bungalow built in 1919. Identifying features of Craftsman style are the exposed rafter tails. The general form and open front porch is typical. The rolled eaves are an unusual elaboration.
- The Lawrence and Hazel Stone house at 1616 Alta Vista Ave. is a Mediterranean Revival-styled home designed by Walter F. Neumann and built in 1922. Hallmarks of the style are the low-pitched roof with broad eaves. The roof of this house is covered with red tile, and the brick walls are decorated with corner quoins. Lawrence Stone helped organize the American Household Supply Co.
- The Raulf house at 6194 Washington Circle is a Craftsman-styled house built in 1922 with red-tiled roofs flared like a Japanese pagoda.
- The Gavahan house at 6327 Upper Parkway North is an Arts and Crafts cottage built in 1923, with the eaves shaped to suggest a thatched roof.
- The Gezelschap house at 2031 Martha Washington Drive is a Neoclassical Revival-styled house built in 1923. The style is characterized by the full-height portico with full entablature and pediment.
- The house at 1613 Upper Parkway South is a Colonial Revival-styled house designed by Leenhouts & Guthrie and built in 1924, with the front facade all symmetric, with the front door flanked by sidelights and pilasters, and topped with a fanlight and a pediment. The cornice is denticulated and the sun-room decorated with Tuscan columns.
- The house at 6167 Washington Circle is an Arts and Crafts-style home built in 1924, with a hip roof broken by an eyebrow window.
- The commercial block at 1401-1415 N 60th St is classic Tudor Revival in style, designed by Rosman and Wierdsma and built in 1927. Hallmarks of the style are the steep roofs, half-timbering, and asymmetry. The conical tower and the stone-arch doorways add a whimsical air.
- The Swendson house at 1651 Alta Vista Ave. is a dignified Tudor Revival home with walls clad in Lannon stone, designed by Buemming & Guth and built in 1926. E.A. Swendson owned an auto dealership.
- The Robert J. and Anastasia Stark House at 1639 Alta Vista Ave. is a large Tudor Revival home designed by Theo. Stark & Co. and built in 1925. It has walls of brick, stone, and half-timbering, a slate-shingled roof, and a decorated 3-story chimney.
- The Powell house at 6256 Upper Parkway North is another Tudor Revival structure, built in 1925 by E.P. Potter, but this one is considered a Germanic Cottage subtype, because of the clipped gables and the low eaves.
- The Wittenberg house at 6614 Hillcrest Drive is a Spanish Colonial Revival-styled house designed by Hugo Haeuser and built in 1927. It has dramatic asymmetry, interesting bays, a red tile roof, and some stylings like the parapet borrowed from Islamic architecture.
- The Schendt house at 6478 Upper Parkway North is a French Eclectic-styled house built in 1928. The style is similar to Tudor Revival, but with the main entry through a round tower, round arches on some windows, with buttresses and bargeboards, and with the chimney topped with clay pots.
- The Hansen house at 6506 Washington Circle is a Spanish Colonial Revival-styled house designed by Ray Dieterich and built in 1930 for Walter Truettner. Typical characteristics of the style are low-pitched roofs covered with red tile, round-arched doors and windows, iron grillwork, and exterior walls of stucco or brick. Later owner Thorvald Hansen was an engineer.
- The Claude house at 1721 Mountain Ave. is a later Colonial Revival-styled house built in 1937 by the Royale Construction Co. Unlike most earlier houses of the style, the facade is asymmetric, but it retains the cornice returns, some columns, and the style of the windows.

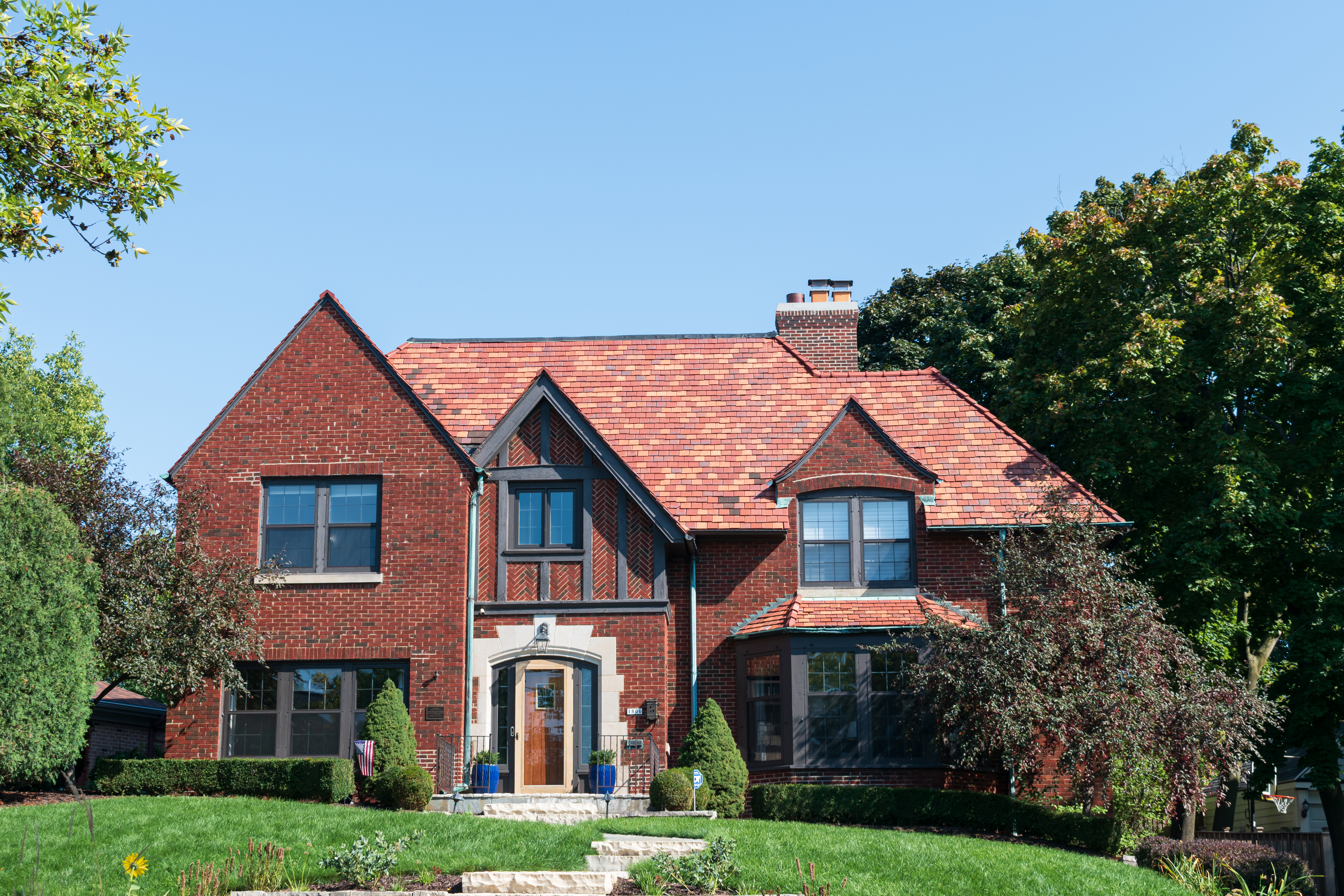
Frank J. and May Tharinger House

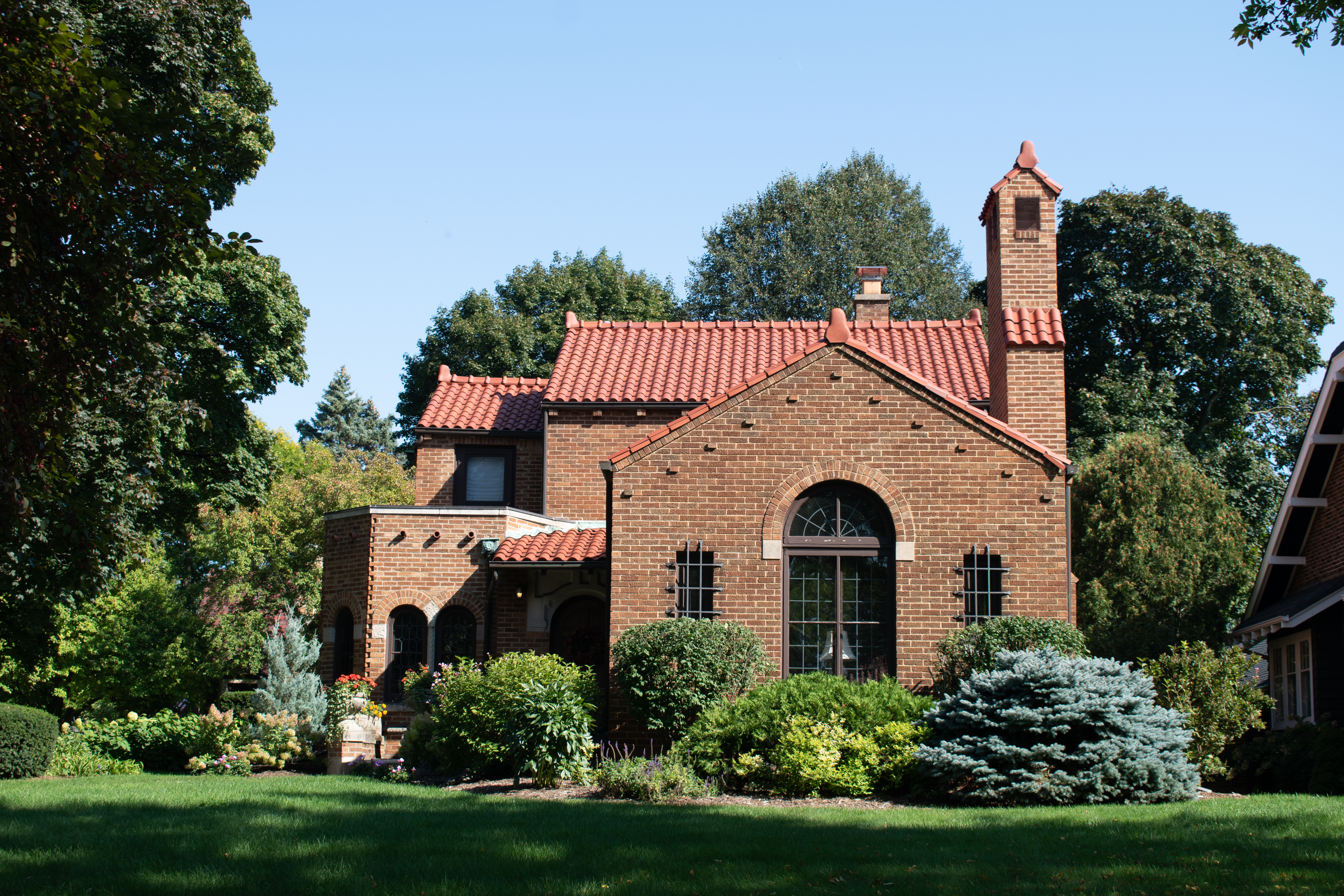
Milan and Pava Radakovich House

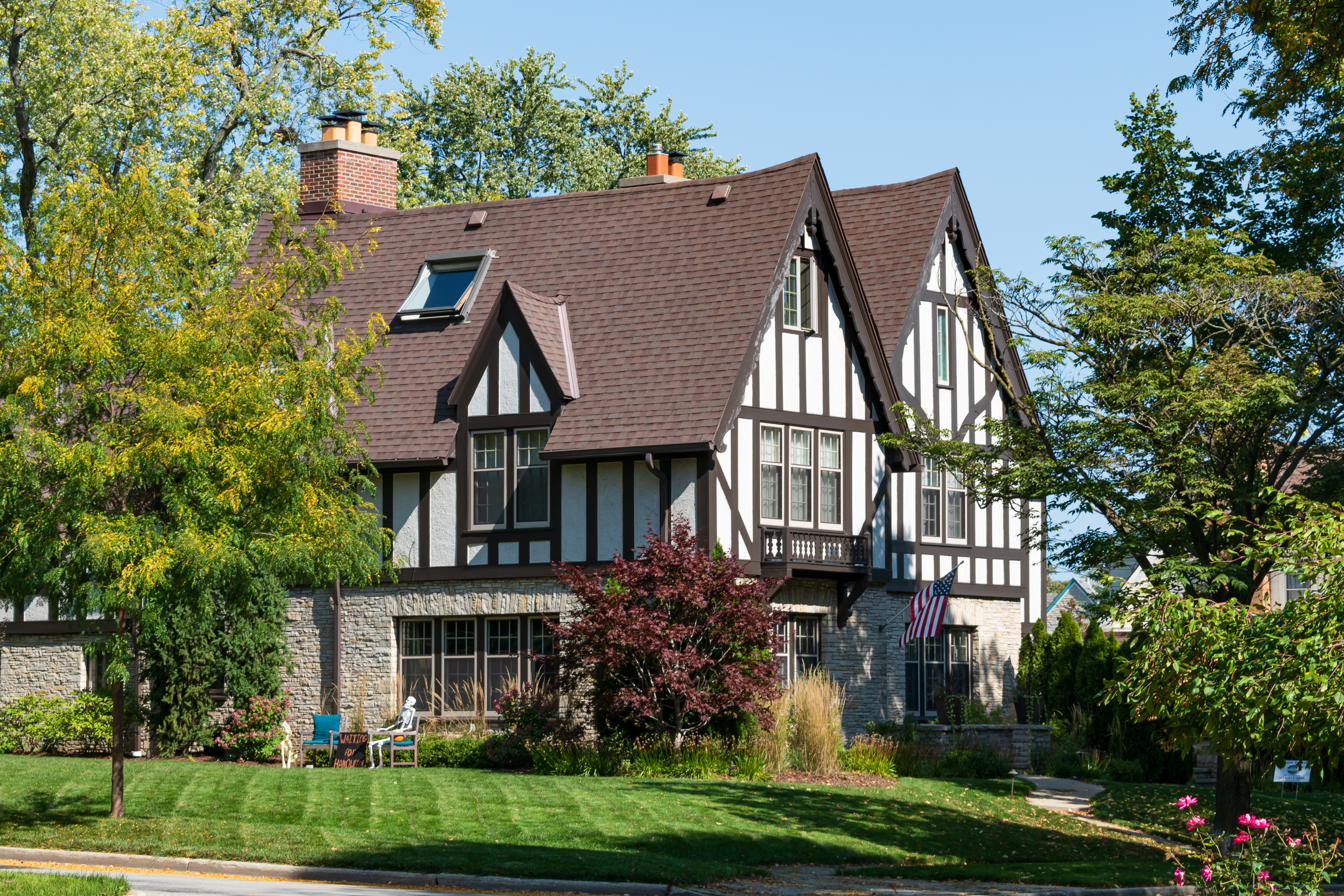
John and Helen Soevig House
