= Hans Grüneberg =

British geneticist

Hans Grüneberg FRS
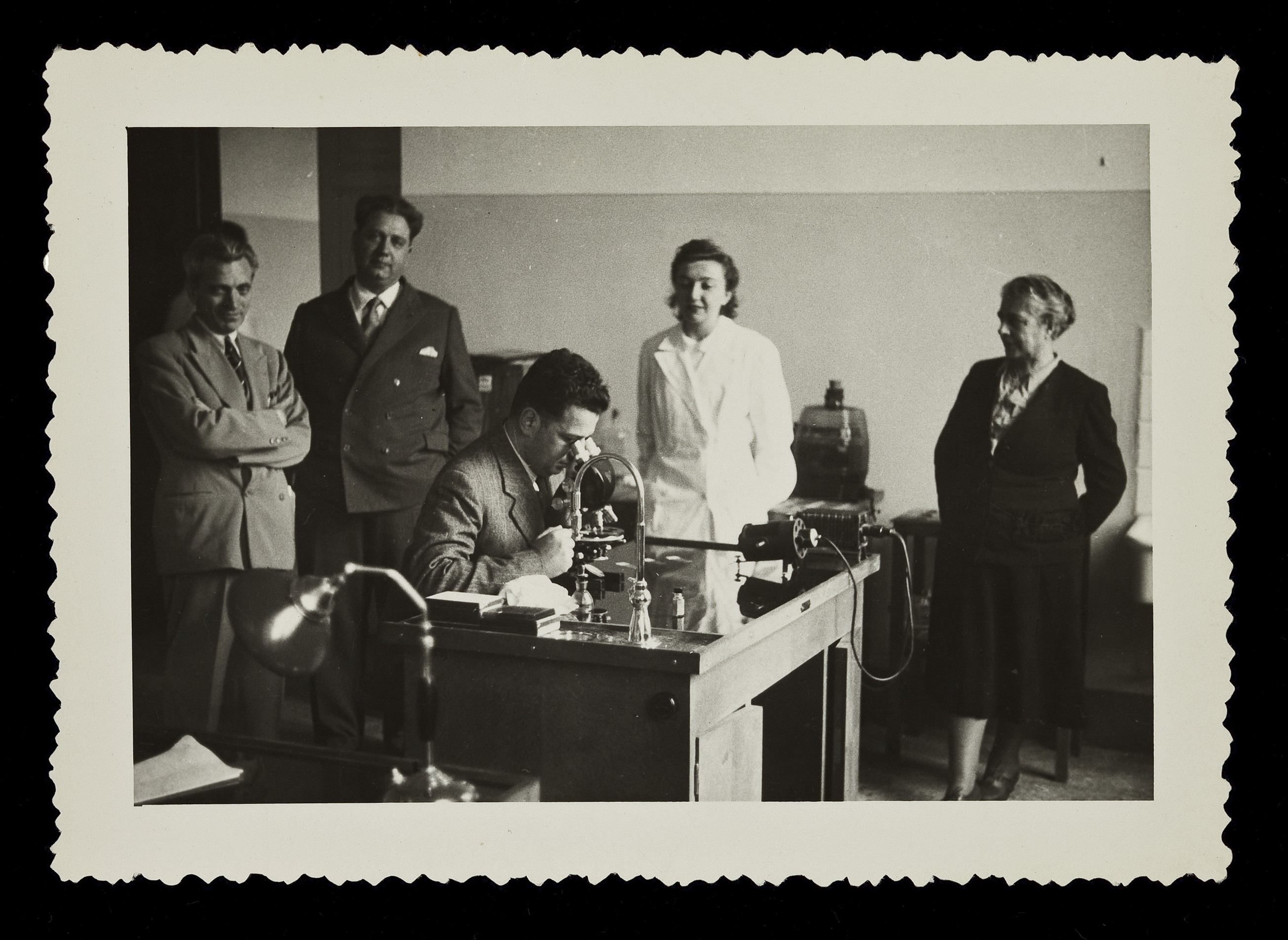
- Hans Grüneberg in 1952
- Born: 26 May 1907; Wuppertal–Elberfeld, Germany
- Died: 23 October 1982 (aged 75)
- Other names: Hans Grueneberg, Hans Gruneberg
- Education: University of Bonn (MD), University of Berlin (PhD), University of London (DSc)
- Known for: Description of siderocytes and sideroblasts
- Scientific career
- Fields: Mouse genetics
- Institutions: Royal Army Medical Corps, University College London
- Patrons: J. B. S. Haldane, Sir Henry Dale

Hans Grüneberg FRS (26 May 1907 – 23 October 1982), whose name was also written as Hans Grueneberg and Hans Gruneberg, was a British geneticist. Grüneberg was born in Wuppertal–Elberfeld in Germany. He obtained an MD from the University of Bonn, a PhD in biology from the University of Berlin and a DSc from the University of London. He arrived in London in 1933, at the invitation of J.B.S. Haldane and Sir Henry Dale.

He was elected a Fellow of the Royal Society in 1956. Most of his work focused on mouse genetics, in which his speciality was the study of pleiotropic effects of mutations on the development of the mouse skeleton.

He was the first person to describe siderocytes and sideroblasts, atypical nucleated erythrocytes with granules of iron accumulated in perinuclear mitochondria. This he reported in the journal Nature. The Grüneberg ganglion, an olfactory ganglion in rodents, was first described by Hans Grueneberg in 1973.

== Career ==
- Honorary Research Assistant, University College London, 1933–38
- Moseley Research Student of Royal Society, 1938–42
- Captain, Royal Army Medical Corps, 1942–46
- Reader in Genetics, University College London, 1946–55
- Honorary Director of the Medical Research Council Experimental Genetics Unit at University College London, 1955–1972
- Professor of Genetics University College London, 1956–1974
- Affiliated with the Department of Pathology, Mount Vernon Hospital, Northwood, Middlesex
- Emeritus Professor University College London, from retirement, 1974

== Books ==
- 1947. Animal genetics and medicine. Hamish Hamilton, London.
- 1952. The genetics of the mouse. 2nd ed, revised and enlarged. Nijhoff, The Hague.
- 1963. The pathology of development: a study of inherited skeletal disorders in animals. Wiley, London.

== Sources ==
- Professor Hans Grüneberg's personal papers archive is available for study at the Wellcome Collection (some material is digitised and digitally accessible via the website).
