= St John's Church, Wissembourg =

Church located in Bas-Rhin, France

Coordinates: 49.0386°N 7.9429°E

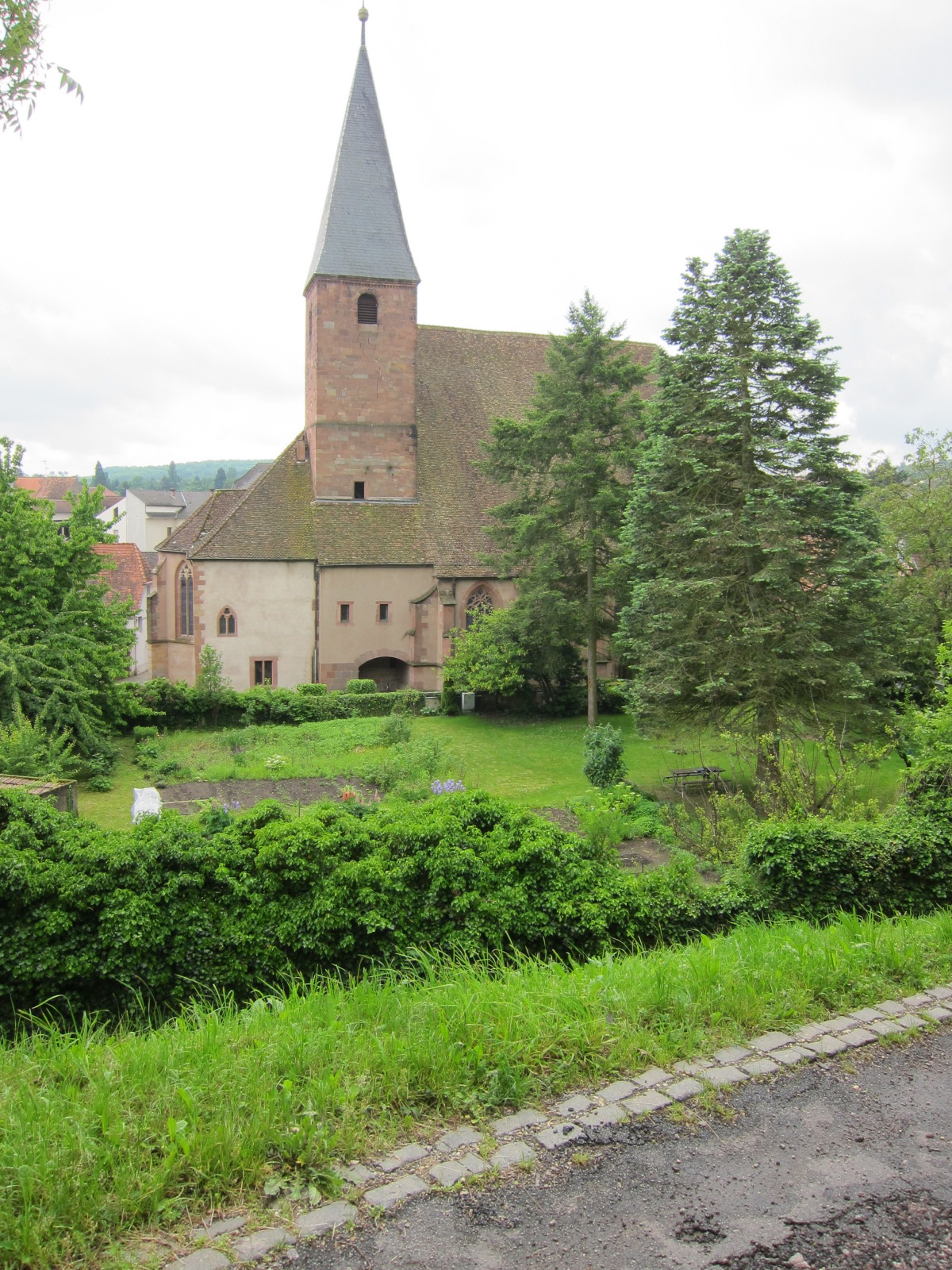
St. John’s Church, Wissembourg, seen through the gardens

St. John's Church (French Église Saint-Jean-l'Évangéliste, German Johanneskirche) is a historical monument in the city of Wissembourg in northeastern France.

== History ==
St. John's was built between the 12th and 16th centuries, though there must have been churches preceding it. At first it was a parish church of Wissembourg, under the patronage of the abbot of Weissenburg Abbey. But this changed when Henri Motherer, a Reformation-minded parish priest managed to buy its independence about 1520. Motherer, by then openly adhering to the Reformation, called on Martin Bucer, whom he considered better qualified, to preach the Reformation. After a tug of war between Catholics and Lutherans in the first decades of the 16th century, St. John's became a Protestant church, and remained so for over a century. But in 1684—a year before the Revocation of the Edict of Nantes—it was forced to become a simultaneum, serving both Protestants and Catholics. It remained a simultaneum until Napoleon returned it to the Protestants, ever since when it has remained a place of worship of the Protestant Church of Augsburg Confession of Alsace and Lorraine. It was classified as a Historical Monument on 6 December 1898. It was heavily damaged during World War II, but it has been restored.

== Building ==
The oldest part of the building is the Romanesque tower. (A lintel of an earlier, pre-Romanesque church incorporated in it may date from the 8th century.) The tower dates from the early 13th century.

The choir, in part likewise from the 13th century, is a mixture of Romanesque and Gothic elements, and features two side chapels. To the left of the choir is the vestry, above which there is a room that must once have served as a chapel.

The 14th-century nave is now quite low, as it is covered by a modern ceiling inspired by that of the vestry.

The chapel to the south of the nave dates from the 15th and 16th centuries. Its two bays have Gothic vaults. The vaults of the northern aisle, which an inscription dates 1513, are flamboyant Gothic.

== Organ ==
=== Earlier instruments ===
Andreas Silbermann built a fairly small organ for Saint-John's between 1717 and 1720. It was altered a number of times, not always felicitously, and was badly damaged during World War II. In 1961 it was replaced by an electro-pneumatic traction organ built by Ernest Mühleisen of the Manufacture d’Orgues Muhleisen. But the neo-classical style of this organ soon went out of fashion, and in spite of a thorough revision by the builders in 1988, it did not age well. In 2005 it was decided to replace it.

=== Thomas Organ ===
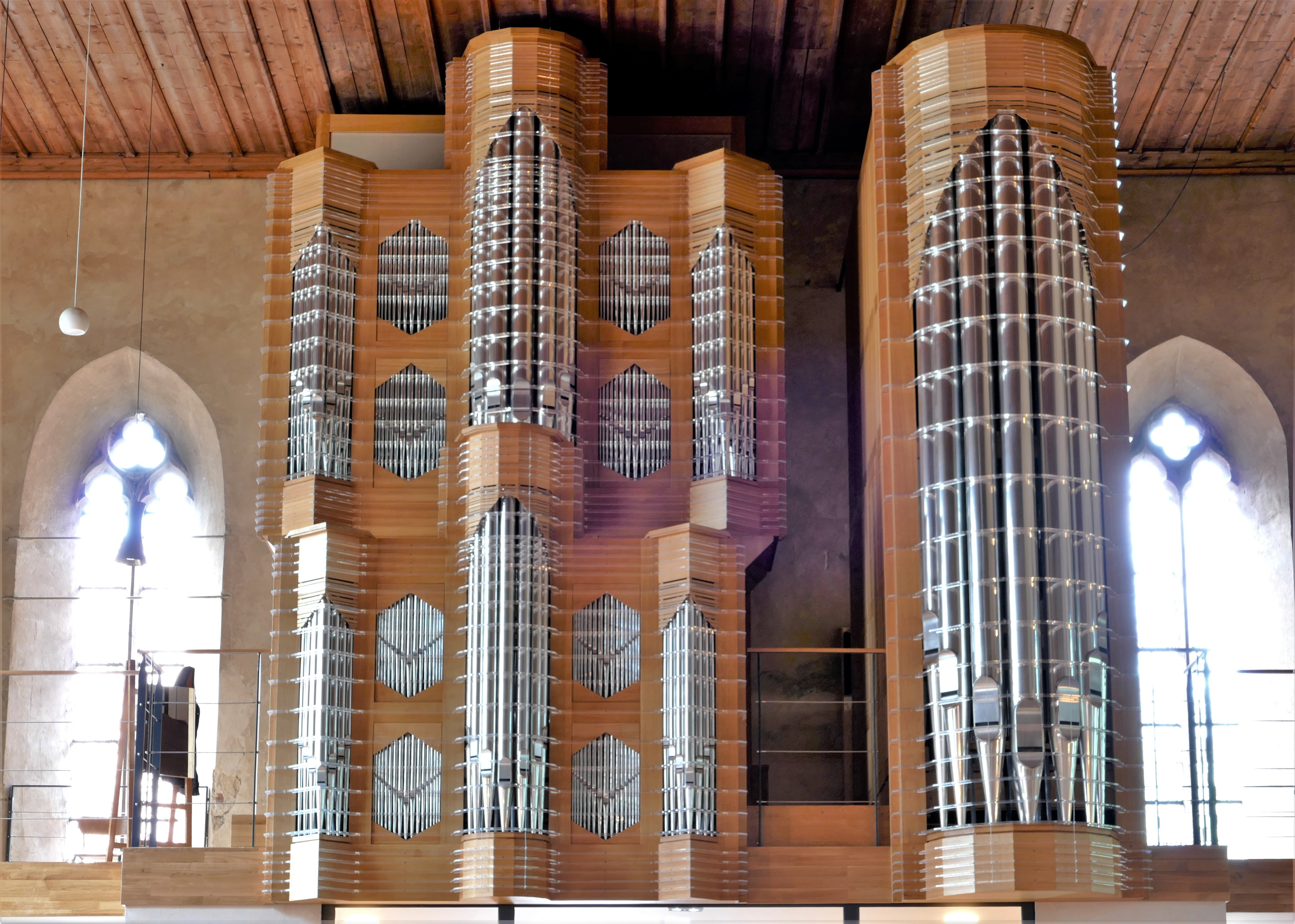

The project was undertaken, not just by the parish and the Union of Protestant Churches of Alsace and Lorraine (UEPAL), but also by the City of Wissembourg, the French state, the Direction régionale des affaires culturelles of Alsace and a group of organ buffs calling themselves "Association des Amis de l'Orgue de St Jean". The parish and the UEPAL required an instrument that would be suitable for the Lutheran liturgy of St John’s. But it was also agreed that the organ should have a role in the musical life of Wissembourg, and so it was desirable, for variety’s sake, that the organ should be quite distinct from two recently restored instruments, the 1766 Dubois organ in St. Peter and St. Paul's Church in Wissembourg itself and the 1913 Walcker organ in the protestant church of nearby Soultz-sous-Forêts. Hence a call for bids was issued for a baroque instrument modeled on North-German organs.

Five bids were considered, but the contract was awarded to the Manufacture d'Orgues Thomas of Sert-Francorchamps. The Thomas organ is faithful to the North German baroque tradition in its mechanical traction, in what stops it has and in the materials of its pipes. But it has a number of modern features. The most noticeable of these is the decidedly contemporary look of its organ case, asymmetrical and decorated with horizontal resin strips whose LEDs can emit light of different colors. Of greater importance for the organist is that the range of its three manuals (C–G''') and its pedal (C-F') is wider than the organ’s models, that its tuning is modern (A = 440 Hz) so that the organ can easily be used in ensembles, and that its stops and their combinations are selected electronically.

The disposition of the Thomas organ is as follows:

Rückpositiv	Hauptwerk	Oberwerk	Pedal
Principal 8	Quintadena 16	Gedackt 8	Principal 16
Gedackt 8	Principal 8	Spillpfeife 8	Subbass 16
Quintadena 8	Rohrflöte 8	Viola di gamba 8	Octav 8
Octav 4	Octav 4	Flöte 4	Octav 4
Rohrflöte 4	Spitzflöte 4	Nasat 2 2/3	Mixture II
Octav 2	Quint 2 2/3	Flöte 2	Mixture IV
Waldflöte 2	Superoctav 2	Quint 1 1/3	Posaune 16
Sesquialtera II	Mixture IV	Trompet 8	Trompet 8
Scharff IV	Trompet 16	Vox humana 8	
Fagott 16		Schalmey 4	
Dulcian 8			

There was a two-part celebration of the inauguration on 28 June 2015, a dedication service in the morning and concert in the afternoon, by Bart Jacobs, the organist of the Brussels Cathedral of St. Michael and St. Gudula.

== Other church furnishings ==
The baptismal font dates from the 17th century, but its basin proper is older and may go back to an earlier church. The pulpit, likewise 17th-century, is Renaissance in style.

== Art ==
The south chapel is decorated with a medallion of Martin Bucer and the northern side aisle features a 19th-century bust of Martin Luther.

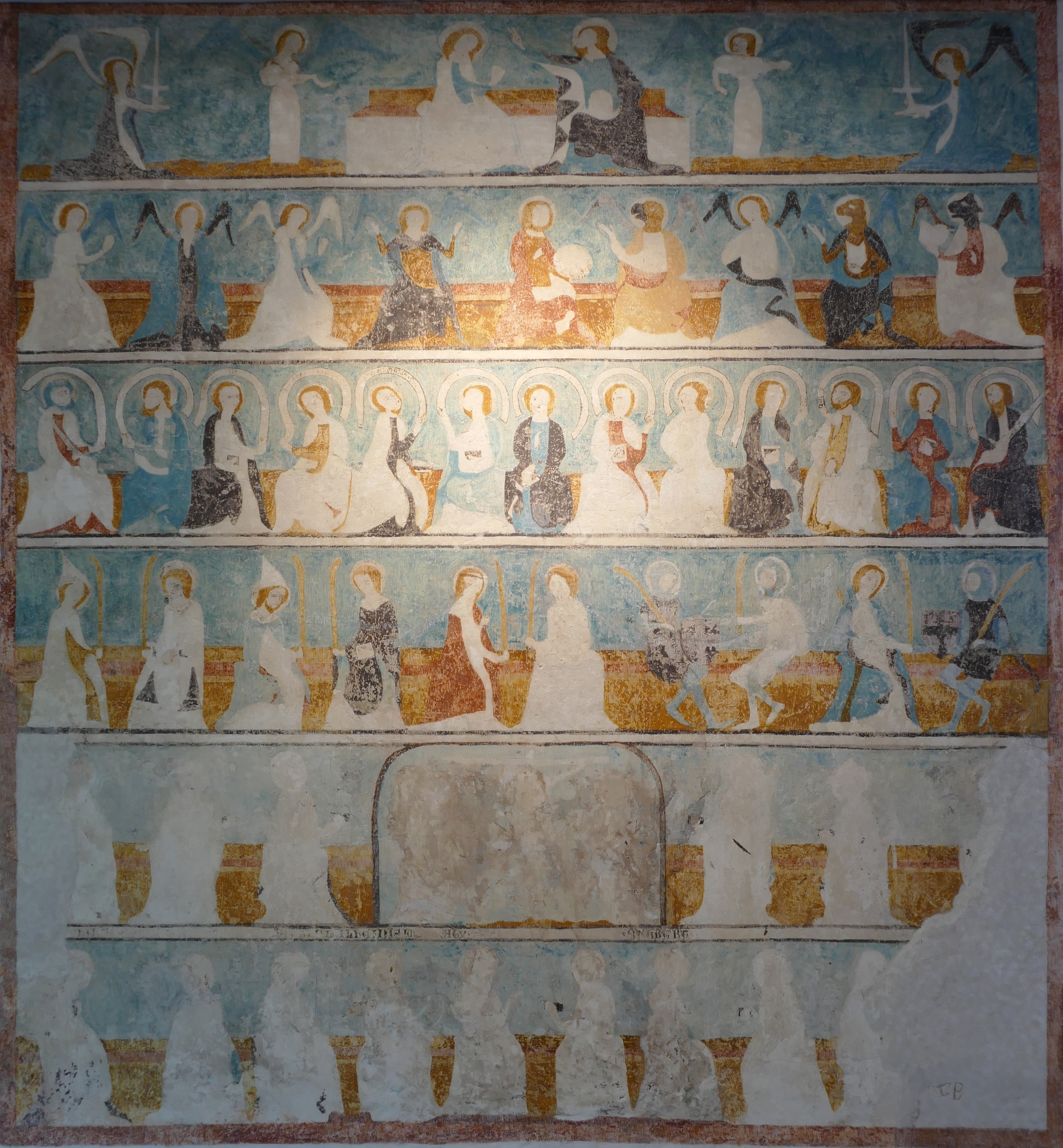
The large mural

The church has several mural paintings from the 14th century, which were restored in 1990. Most of them are in the former chapel above the vestry, but a mural in the vestry itself shows Christ crucified, with two angels that capture his blood. In the chapel, two murals represent Saint Erasmus of Formia, one as he is teaching, and another while he is being tortured. The largest mural is a rectangle divided in six horizontal bands, which depict (from top to bottom)

- the Coronation of the Virgin
- three angels, the Virgin, Christ holding a Globe and the Four Evangelists
- thirteen saints or apostles
- ten martyrs
- the Crucifixion of Jesus and six unrecognizable figures, three to the left and three to the right
- ten unrecognizable figures

In much better shape than the lowest two bands of this mural are those of Saint Catherine of Alexandria and of a virgin (or the Virgin) with a unicorn.

== Gallery ==
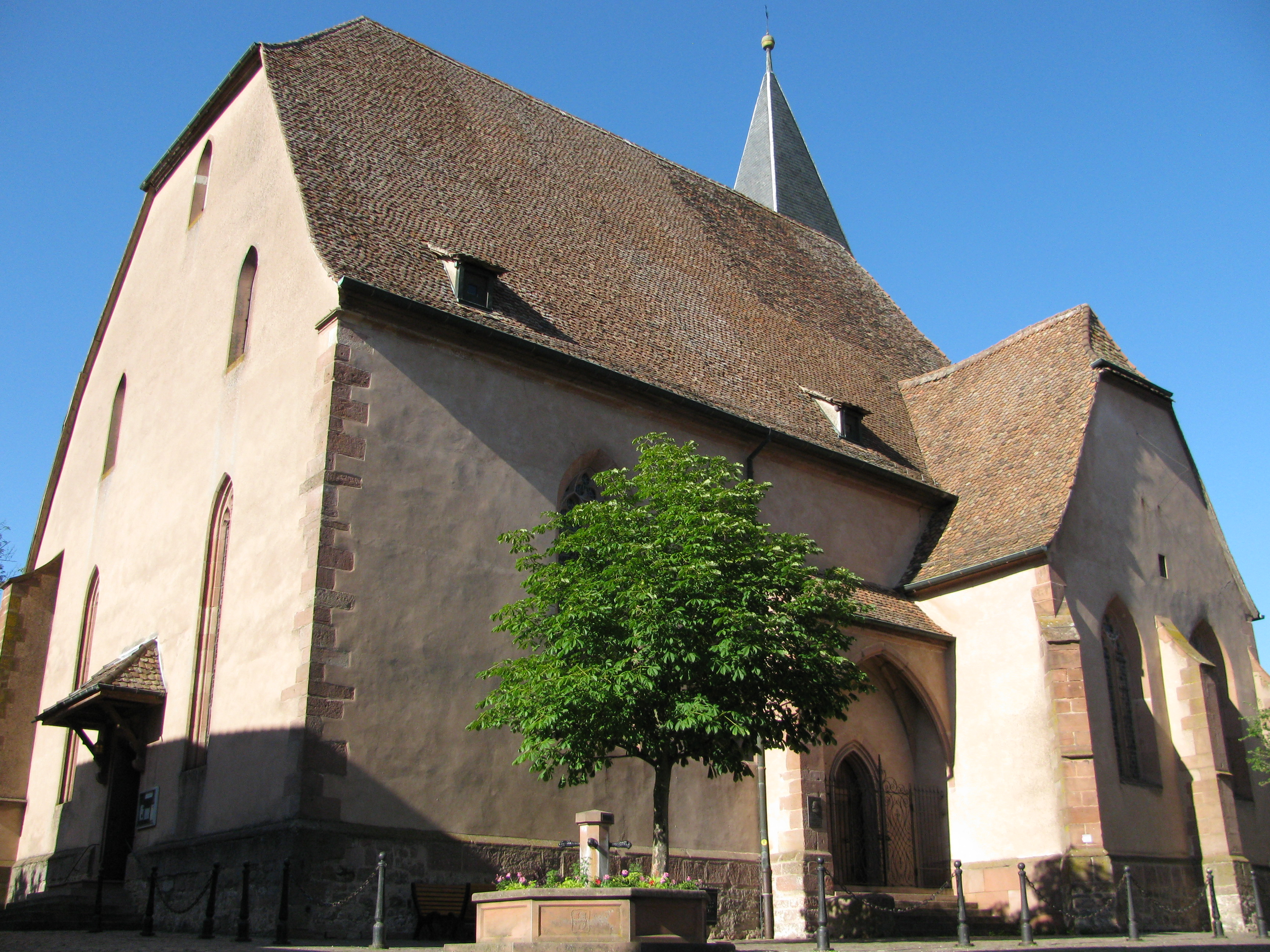
View from the southwest

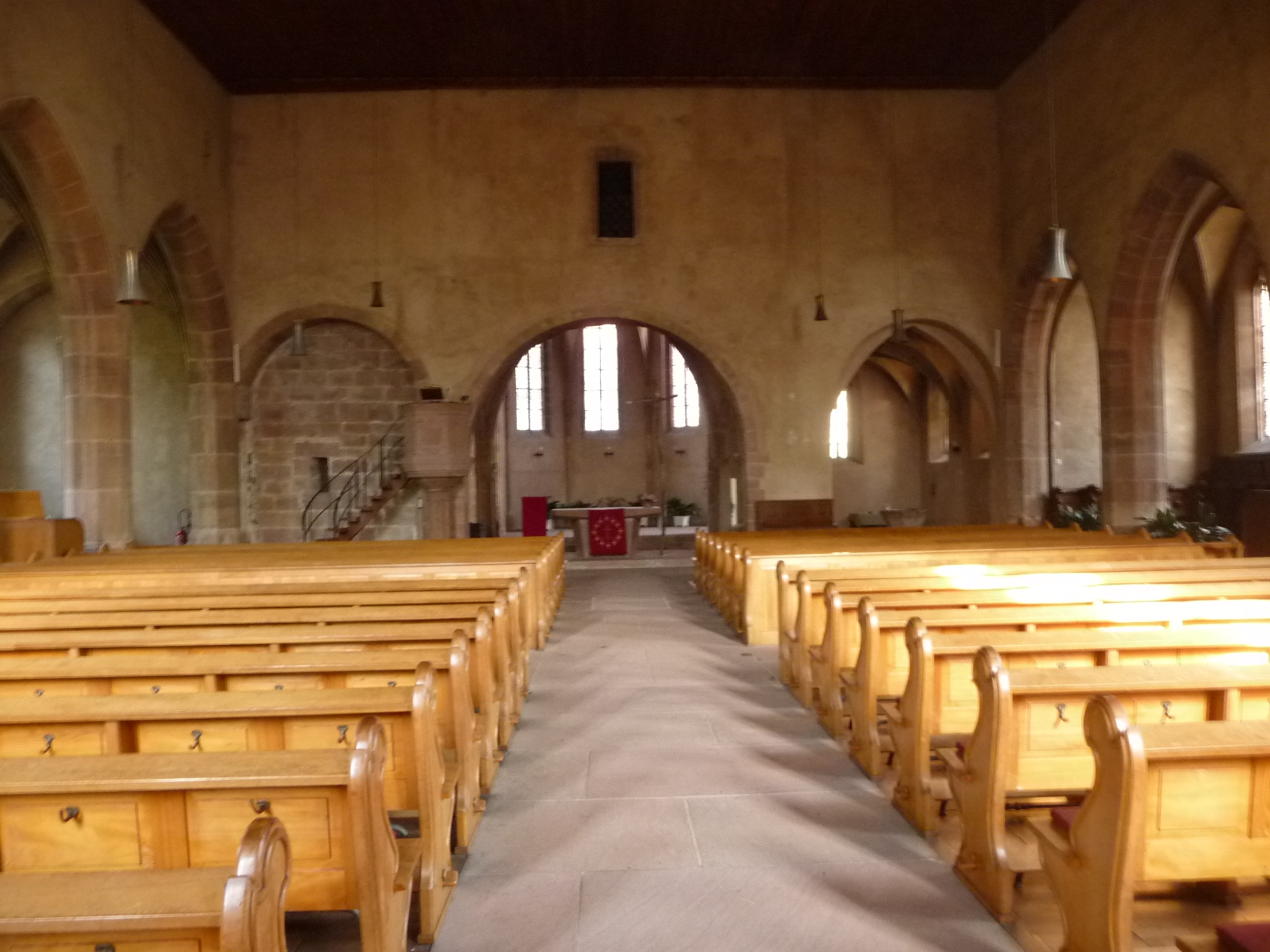
The nave, with pulpit and altar

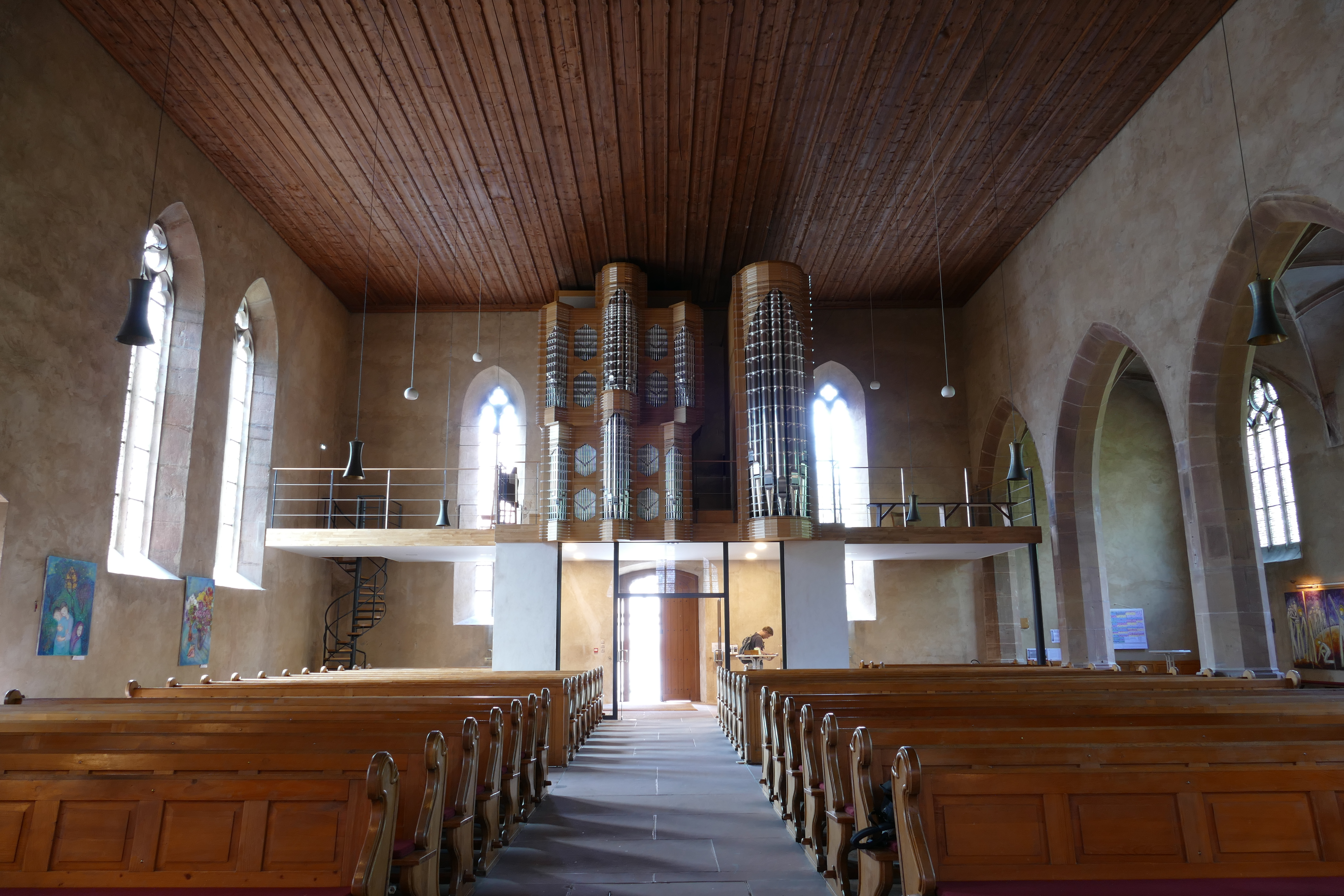
The nave, with the Thomas organ

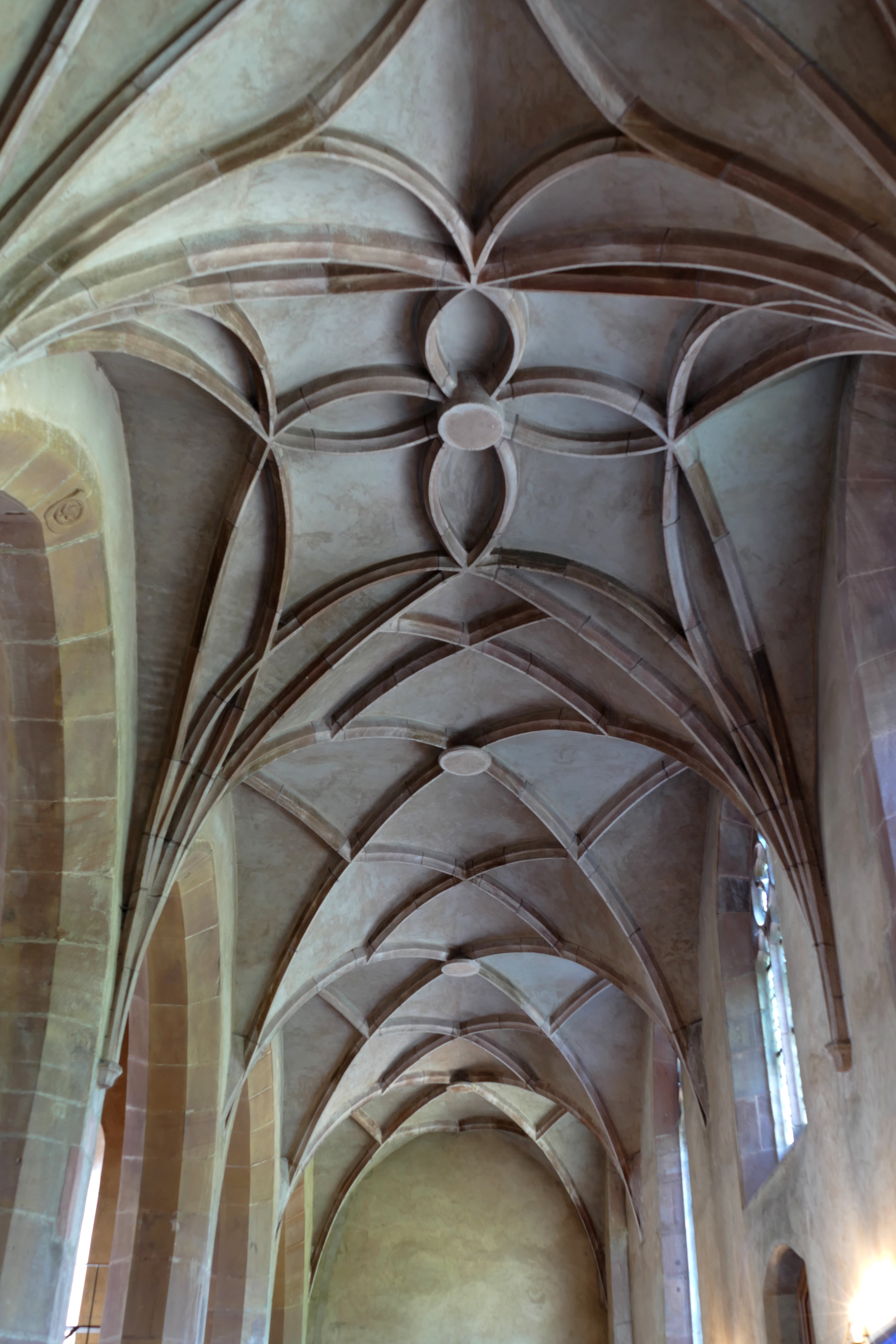
The vaults of the northern aisle

== Sources ==
Unless otherwise indicated by the notes, the information in this article is based on this page of the website of Saint John’s parish (like all websites in this article, consulted in October 016), and on the following sources about the organ:

- (An.) s.d. Un nouvel orgue – Eine neue Orgel: Eglise Saint Jean Wissembourg: Association des Amis de l’Orgue Paroisse protestante St Jean.
- Lutz, Christian 2015 "Composition de l’Orgue" in L’orgue Thomas de l’église St Jean Wissembourg: Inauguration de l’orgue 28 juin 2015 Wissembourg: Paroisse St Jean, pp. 10–19.
