= Wissembourg =

Wissembourg Weißenburg
- Commune
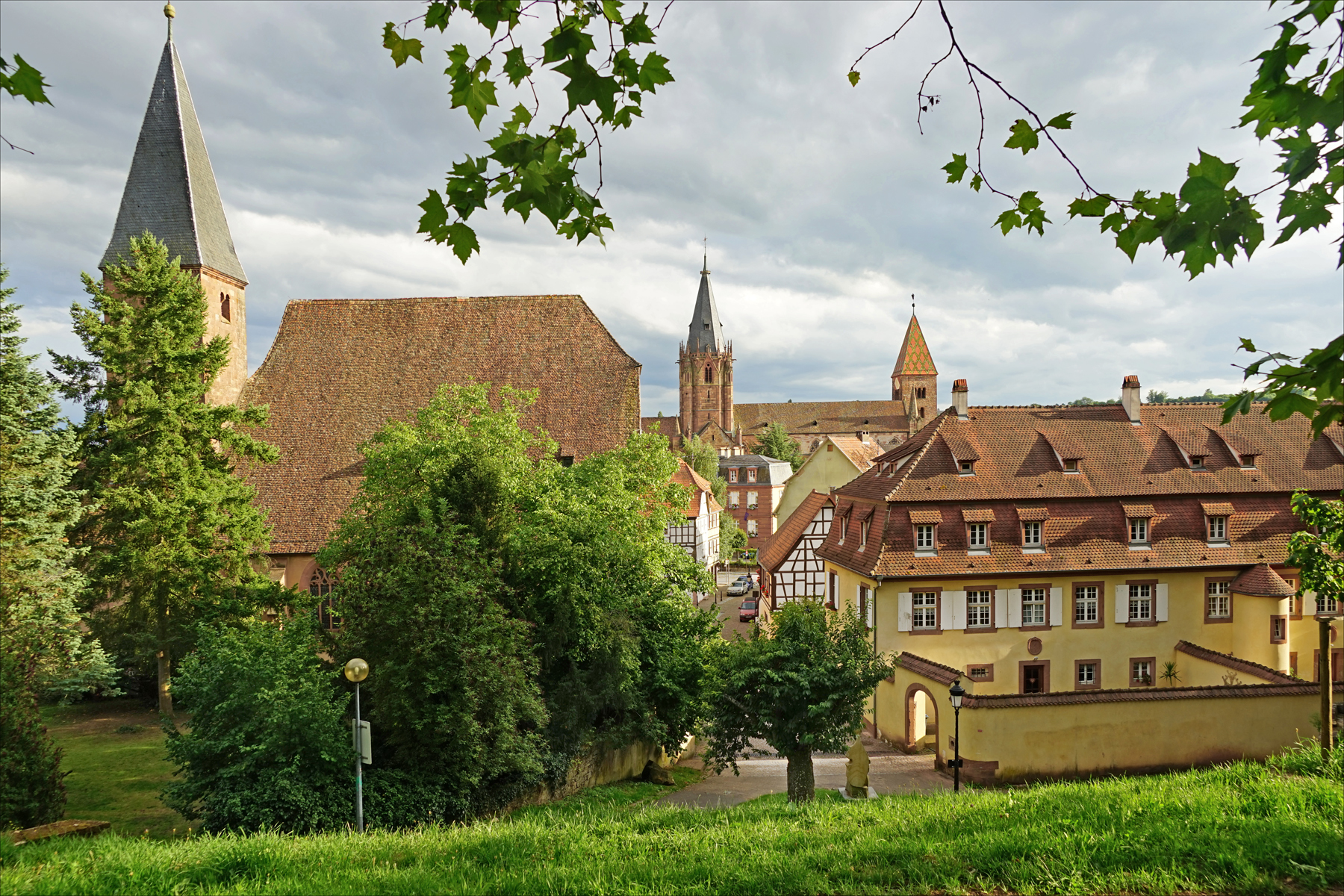
- A general view of Wissembourg

- Coat of arms
- Location of Wissembourg
- Location within France Location within Grand Est
- Coordinates: 49°02′N 7°57′E
- Country: France
- Region: Grand Est
- Department: Bas-Rhin
- Arrondissement: Haguenau-Wissembourg
- Canton: Wissembourg
- Intercommunality: Pays de Wissembourg

Government
  - Mayor (2020–2026): Sandra Fischer-Junck
- Area^{1}: 48.18 km^{2} (18.60 sq mi)
- Elevation: 160 m (520 ft)
- Highest elevation: 527 m (1,729 ft)
- Lowest elevation: 133 m (436 ft)
- Population (2023): 7,566
  - Density: 157.0/km^{2} (406.7/sq mi)
- Time zone: UTC+01:00 (CET)
  - Summer (DST): UTC+02:00 (CEST)
- INSEE/Postal code: 67544 /67160
- Website: https://www.ville-wissembourg.eu/
- ^{1} French Land Register data, which excludes lakes, ponds, glaciers > 1 km^{2} (0.386 sq mi or 247 acres) and river estuaries.

Wissembourg (French pronunciation: [visɑ̃buʁ]; South Franconian: Weisseburch [ˈvaɪsəbʊʁç]; German: Weißenburg [ˈvaɪsn̩bʊʁk]) is a commune in the Bas-Rhin department in Grand Est in northeastern France.

Wissembourg was a sub-prefecture of the department until 2015. The name Wissembourg is a Gallicized version of Weißenburg (Weissenburg) in German meaning "white castle". The Latin place-name, sometimes used in ecclesiastical sources, is Sebusium.

The town was annexed by France after 1648 but then incorporated into Germany in 1871. It was returned to France in 1919, but reincorporated back into Germany in 1940. After 1944 it again became French.

== Geography ==
Wissembourg is situated on the little river Lauter close to the border between France and Germany approximately 60 km (37 mi) north of Strasbourg and 35 km (22 mi) west of Karlsruhe. The Wissembourg station offers rail connections to Strasbourg, Haguenau and Landau (Germany).

== History ==
Map of Wissembourg (c. 1750)

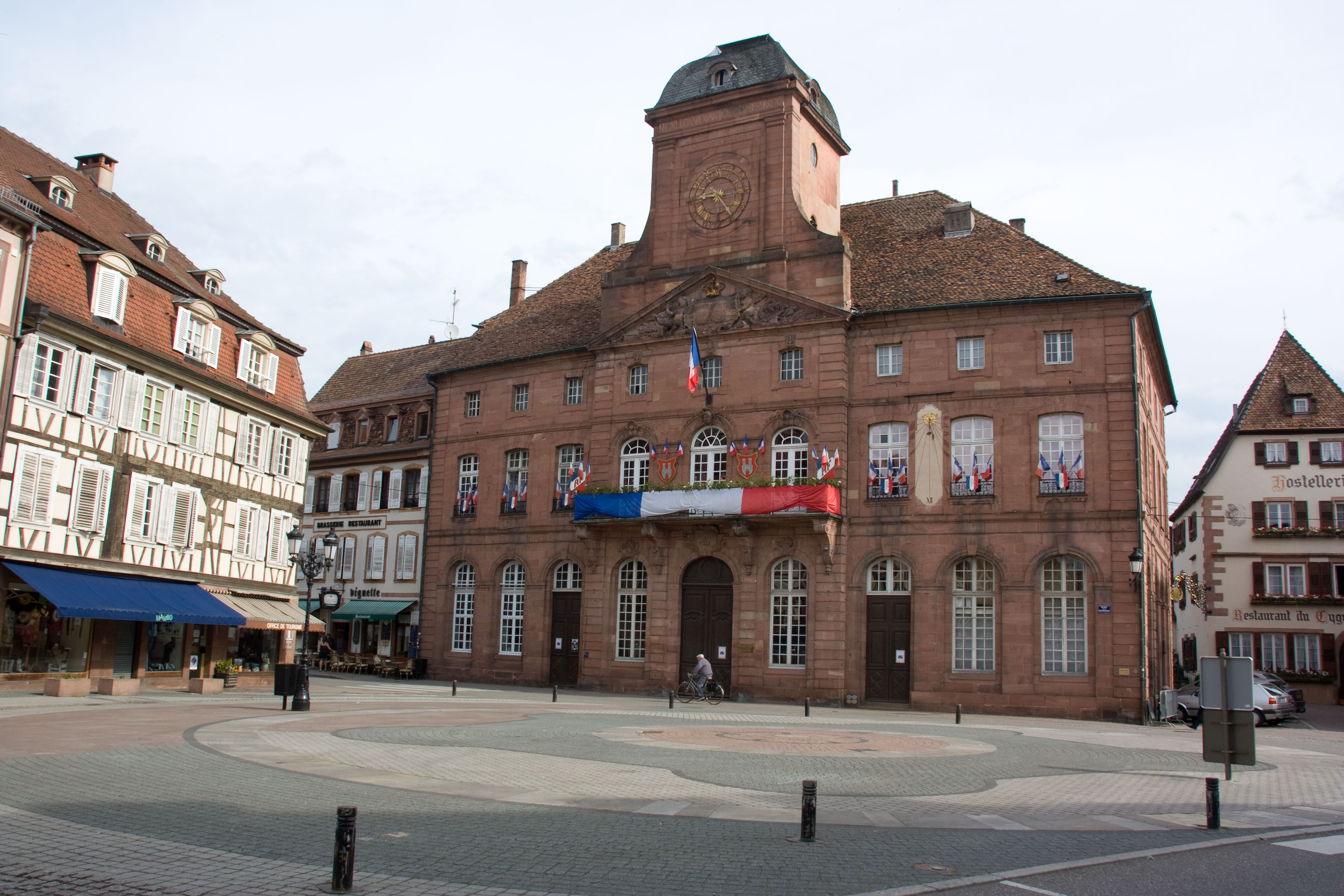
Town hall

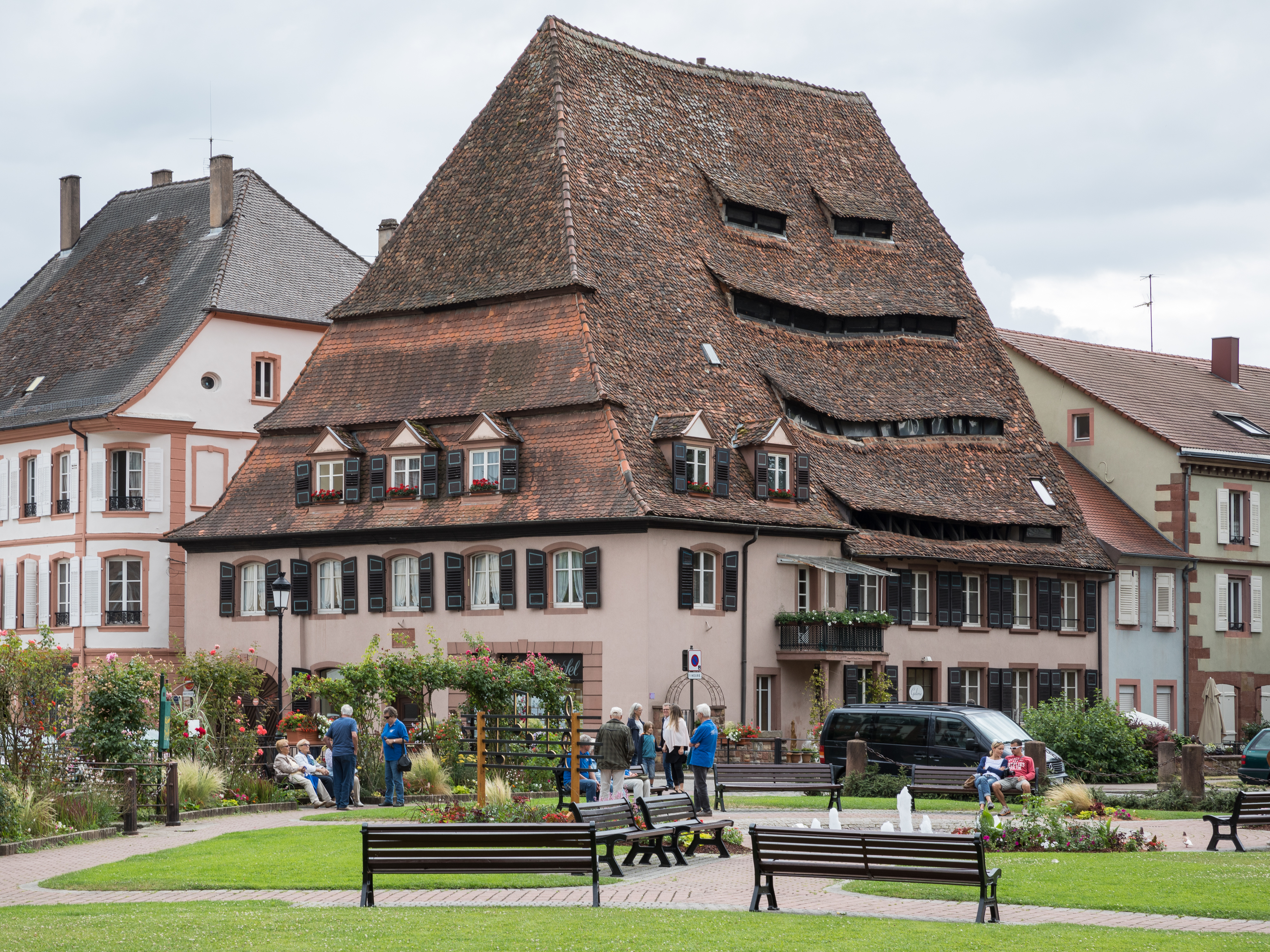
Maison du sel, Wissembourg

Weissenburg (later Wissembourg) Abbey, the Benedictine abbey around which the town has grown, was founded in the 7th century, perhaps under the patronage of Dagobert I. The abbey was supported by vast territories. Of the 11th-century buildings constructed under the direction of Abbot Samuel, only the Schartenturm and some moats remain. The town was fortified in the 13th century. The abbey church of Saint-Pierre et Paul erected in the same century under the direction of Abbot Edelin was secularized in the French Revolution and despoiled of its treasures; in 1803 it became the parish church, resulting in the largest parish church of Alsace, only exceeded in size by the cathedral of Strasbourg. At the abbey in the late 9th century the monk Otfried composed a gospel harmony, the first substantial work of verse in German.

In 1354 Emperor Charles IV made it one of the grouping of ten towns called the Décapole that survived annexation by France under Louis XIV in 1678 and was extinguished with the French Revolution. On 25 January 1677 a great fire destroyed many houses and the Hôtel de Ville; its replacement dates from 1741 to 1752. Many early structures were spared: the Maison du Sel (1448), under its Alsatian pitched roof, was the first hospital of the town. There are many 15th- and 16th-century timber-frame houses, and parts of the walls and gateways of the town. The Maison de Stanislas was the retreat of Stanisław Leszczyński, ex-king of Polish-Lithuanian Commonwealth, from 1719 to 1725, when the formal request arrived on 3 April 1725 asking for the hand of his daughter in marriage to Louis XV. The First Battle of Wissembourg took place near the town in 1793.

The "Lines of Wissembourg" (French: Lignes de Wissembourg; German: Weißenburger Linien), originally made by Villars in 1706, were famous. They were a line of works extending to Lauterbourg nine miles to the southeast. Like the fortifications of the town, only vestiges remain, although the city wall is still intact for stretches. Austrian General von Wurmser succeeded in briefly capturing the lines in October 1793, but was defeated two months later by General Pichegru of the French Army and forced to retreat, along with the Prussians, across the River Rhine.

Wissembourg formed the setting for the Romantic novel L'ami Fritz (1869) co-written by the team of Erckmann and Chatrian, which provided the material for Mascagni's opera L'amico Fritz.

Another Battle of Wissembourg took place on 4 August 1870. It was the first battle of the Franco-Prussian War. The Prussians were nominally commanded by the Crown Prince Frederick, but ably directed by his chief of staff, General Leonhard Graf von Blumenthal. The French defeat allowed the Prussian army to move into France. The Geisberg monument commemorates the battle; the town's cemetery holds large numbers of soldiers, including the stately tomb of French general Abel Douay who was killed in combat.

In 1975 the commune of Wissembourg absorbed the former commune of Altenstadt.

== Population ==
Historical population
Year	Pop.	±% p.a.
1968	6,466	—
1975	6,784	+0.69%
1982	7,311	+1.07%
1990	7,443	+0.22%
1999	8,170	+1.04%
2007	7,978	−0.30%
2012	7,757	−0.56%
2017	7,537	−0.57%
2023	7,566	+0.06%
Source: INSEE

== Transport ==
The nearest airports to Wissembourg are:

- Karlsruhe/Baden-Baden Airport, located 48 km (30 mi) south east
- Strasbourg Airport, located 82 km (51 mi) south
- Frankfurt Airport, located 150 km (93 mi) north
- EuroAirport Basel Mulhouse Freiburg, located 191 km (119 mi) south

== Notable people ==
- Otfrid of Weissenburg (c. 800 – after 870 AD) was a monk at the abbey of Weissenburg.
- Justus Ludwik Decjusz (German: Jost Ludwig Dietz, Latin: Iodocus Ludovicus Decius (1485–1545) notable Polish burgher and diplomat of German origin in 16th-century Kraków.
- Martin Bucer (1491–1551) was a Protestant reformer based in Wissembourg/Strasbourg who influenced Lutheran, Calvinist, and Anglican doctrines and practices.
- Karl Harst (1492–1563), German diplomat and assistant of Erasmus
- Stanisław Leszczyński, king of Poland from 1704 to 1709, exiled in Wissembourg and lived there from 1719 to 1725. The school in the city now bears his name.
- Jacob Job Élie (1746-1825), French divisional general of the Revolutionary and Napoleonic Wars and among the leaders of the 1789 storming of the Bastille
- Jean-Gotthard Grimmer, (1749–1820), pastor at Wissembourg then deputy to the National Convention on 10 ventôse year III (28 February 1795) to replace Philibert Simond.
- Louis Moll (1809–1880), agronomist, born in Wissembourg.
- Joseph Guerber (1824–1909), priest.
- Auguste Dreyfus (1827–1897), businessman who made his fortune by financing the Peruvian trade in guano.
- Charles de Foucauld (1858–1916), cavalry officer in the French Army, explorer, geographer, and Catholic priest and hermit who lived among the Tuareg in the Sahara in Algeria.
- Jean Frédéric Wentzel (1807–1869), printer and lithographer.
- Julie Velten Favre (1833–1896), philosopher and educator.
- Jean-Pierre Hubert (1941–2006), a science-fiction writer.
- Christophe Bertrand (1981-2010), a composer of contemporary classical music.
- Jean-François Kornetzky (1982–), football goalkeeper.
- Drew Heissler aka Pokey LaFarge (1983–), is an American roots musician and songwriter. His family emigrated from Wissembourg/Alsace.
- Alix Bénézech (1991–), actress and director.

== Sights ==
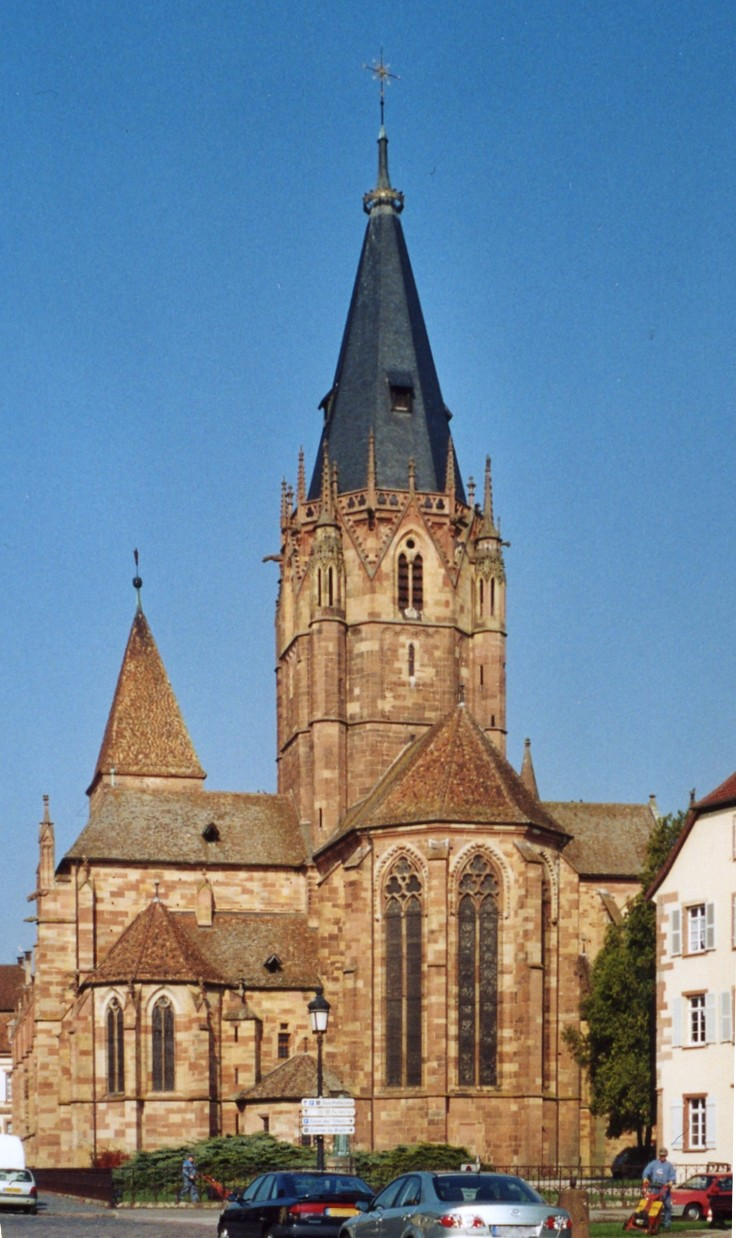
Church of Saints-Pierre et Paul

The town, set in a landscape of wheat fields, retains a former Benedictine monastery with its large-scale Gothic church, now the parish church of Saints Peter and Paul's church (Église Saints-Pierre-et-Paul). Other medieval churches are the Lutheran St John's church (Église Saint-Jean), and the Romanesque St Ulrich's church (Église Saint-Ulrich) in Altenstadt. The 13th-century Dominican church now serves as the cultural center "La Nef". The Grenier aux Dîmes (tithe barn) belonging to the abbey is from the 18th century but an ancient foundation. Noteworthy houses are the medieval "Salt house" (Maison du sel), the Renaissance "House of l'Ami Fritz," the Baroque town hall, a work by Joseph Massol, and Château du Geisberg.

== See also ==
- Communes of the Bas-Rhin department
- Château Saint-Rémy d'Altenstadt
