= Hôtel de Ville, Wissembourg =

Hôtel de Ville de Wissembourg
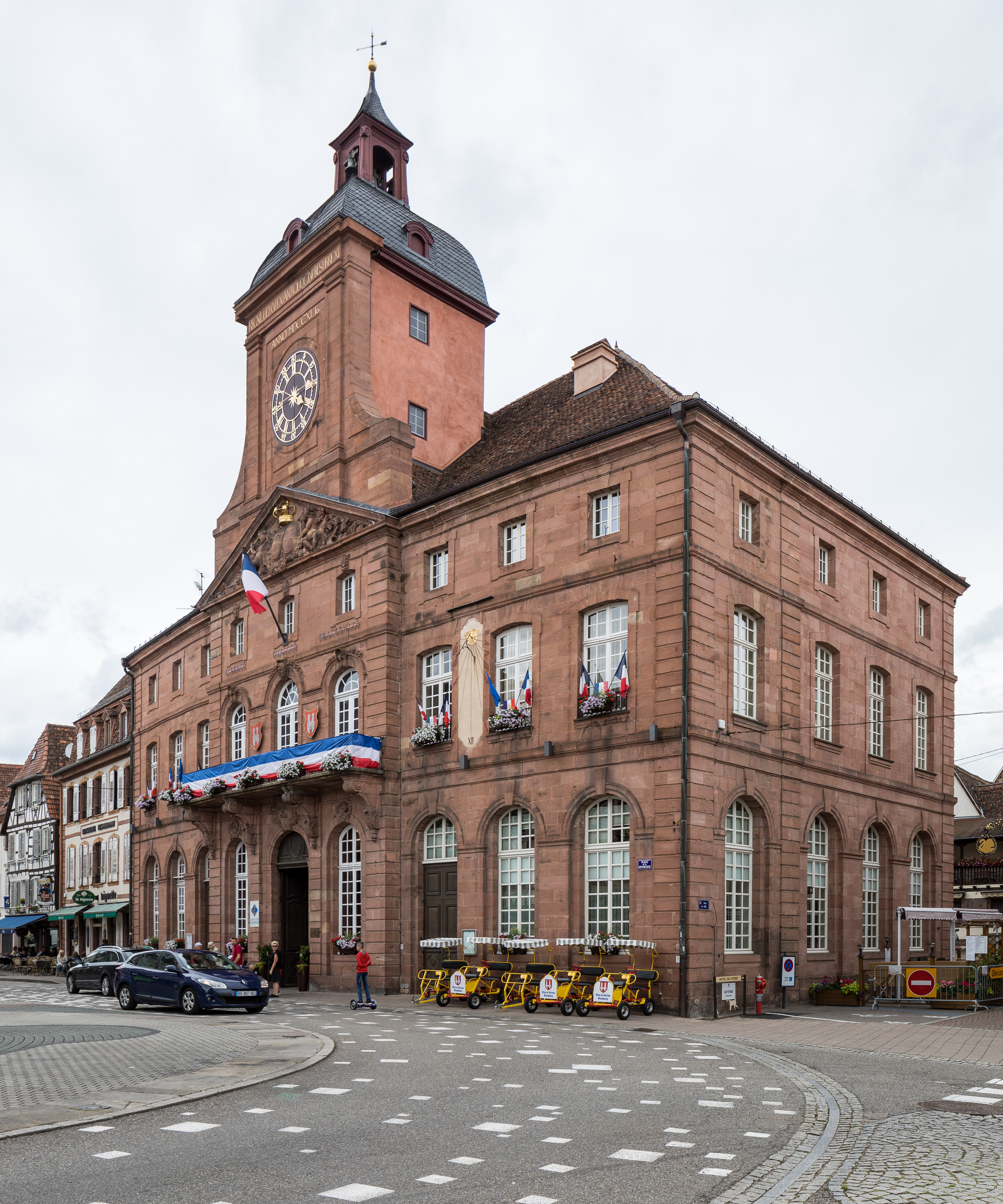
- The town hall in 2017
- Former names: Rathaus Weißenburg

General information
- Type: Town hall
- Architectural style: Baroque architecture
- Classification: Monument historique
- Location: 11, place de la République; 67160 Wissembourg, Wissembourg, France
- Coordinates: 49.0369°N 7.9444°E
- Groundbreaking: 26 June 1741
- Inaugurated: 27 June 1752
- Renovated: 2009–2012

Technical details
- Material: pink sandstone
- Floor count: 5 (including tower)

Design and construction
- Architect: Joseph Massol

Monument historique
- Official name: Hôtel de ville
- Type: Inscrit
- Designated: 1932
- Reference no.: PA00085251

Hôtel de Ville de Wissembourg (French pronunciation: [otɛl də vil də visɑ̃buʁ]) is a Baroque city hall in Wissembourg, a small town at the northern edge of the Bas-Rhin department of France, close to the German state of Rhineland-Palatinate. It is classified as a Monument historique by the French Ministry of Culture since 1932.

== History ==
The new city hall was designed by the architect Joseph Massol in order to replace the medieval town hall (recorded in 1396) that had been burned down on 25 January 1677 by French troops (q. v. History of Alsace). The groundbreaking ceremony took place on 26 June 1741, and the inauguration took place eleven years later, on 27 June 1752.

Depending on the sources, the town hall has been entirely renovated from 2009 until 2011, or from 2010 until 2012. Previous restorations had taken place in 1826, 1937 and 1959.

== Description ==
The Louis Quinze town hall of Wissembourg is built in pink sandstone. The three floors below the roof are of decreasing height: the ground floor is almost twice as high as the first floor, which is in turn almost twice as high as the second floor (see infobox picture and first picture below). Its façade features an avant-corps containing the main portal, a balcony, and a pediment, and is crowned with a clock tower surmounted by a ridge turret. The right side of the façade also features a sundial. The whole is decorated with mascarons and other reliefs. The original hands of the clock face now belong to the collections of the municipal museum musée Westercamp. The inscriptions on the façade read ANNO MDCCXLI ("the year 1741") and REGNLUDXVEXANTIQUOCINERESURREXI ("under the reign of Louis XV, I resurrected from ancient ashes").

== Gallery ==
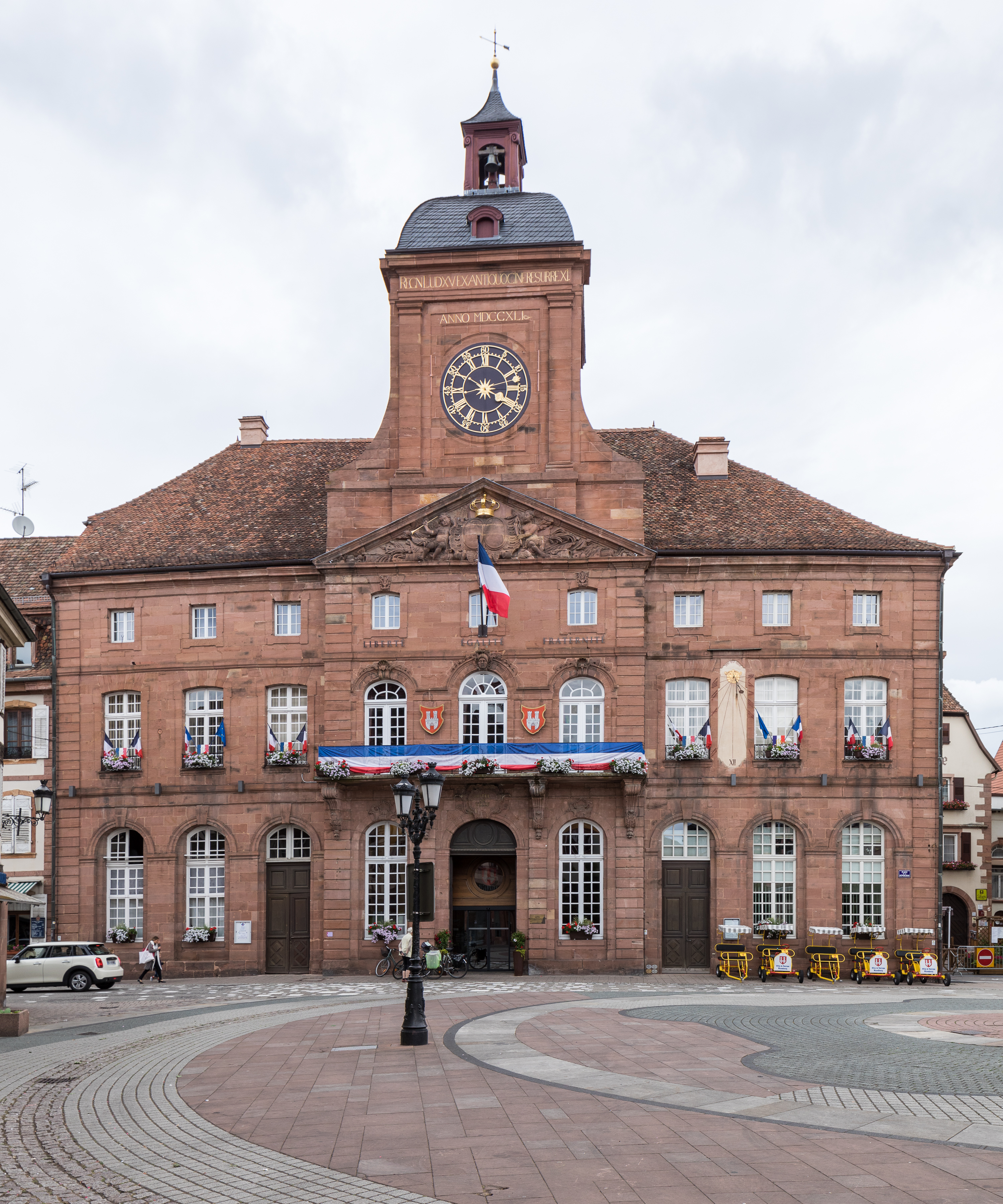
Frontal view of the façade

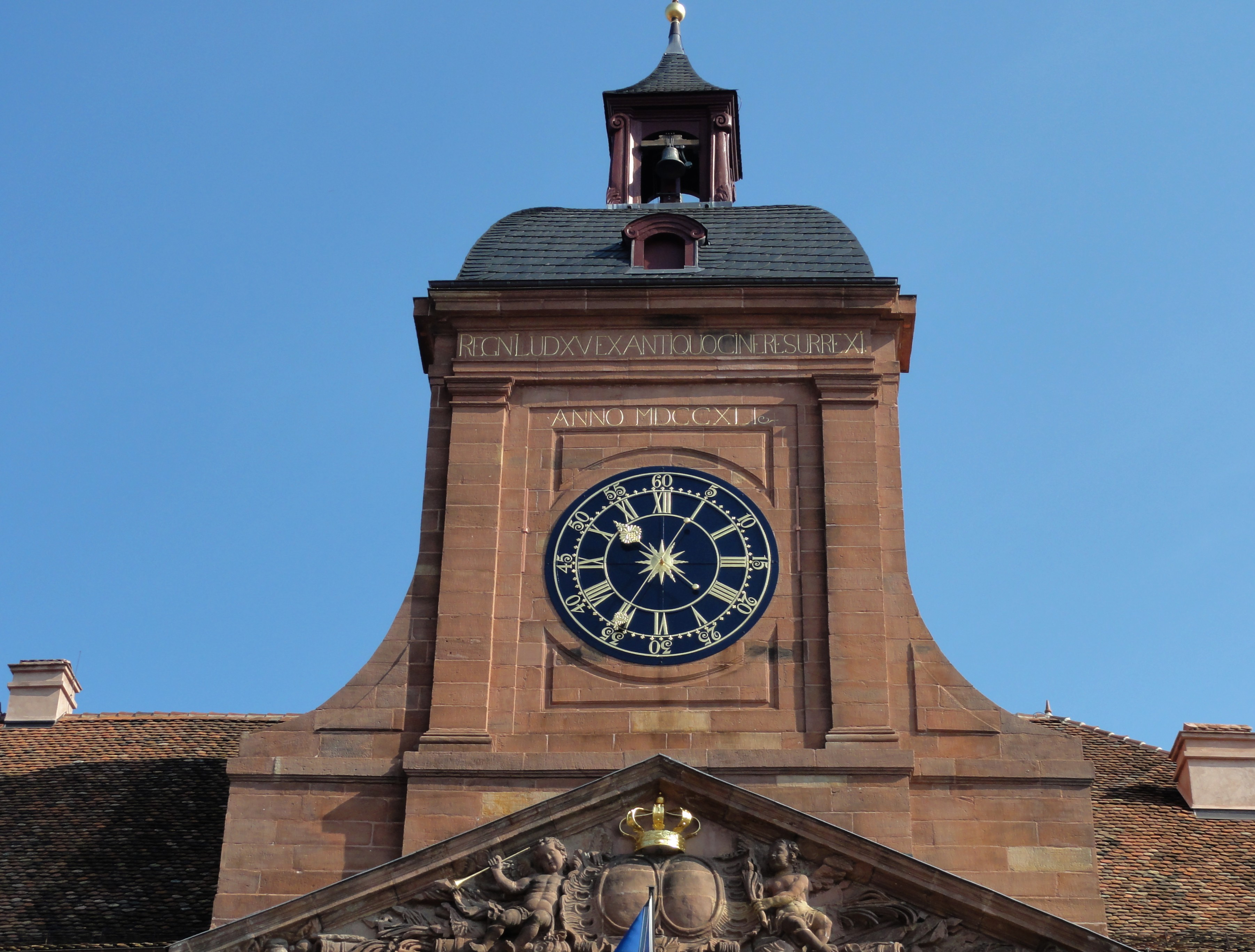
Tower with clock and ridge turret

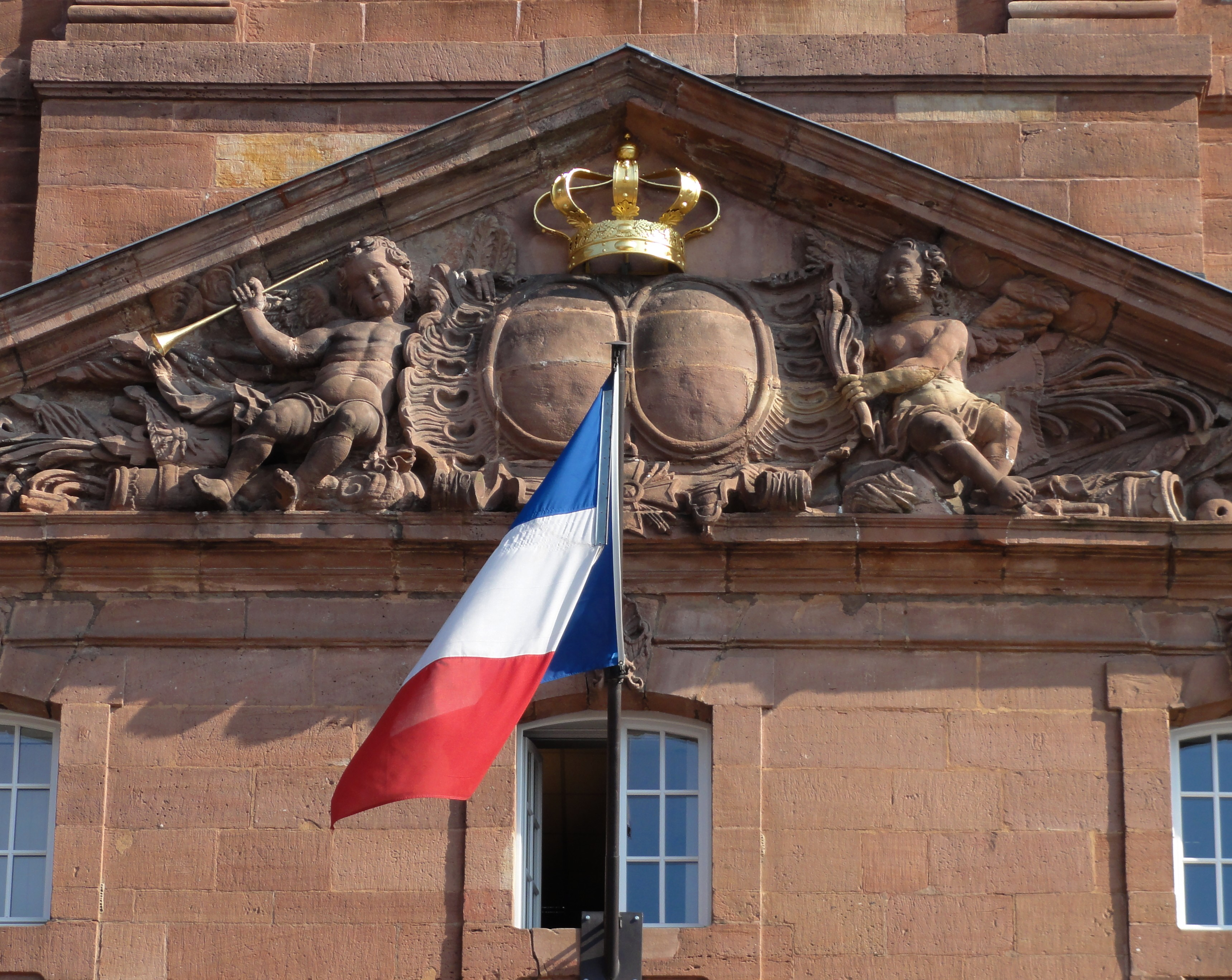
Pediment of the façade

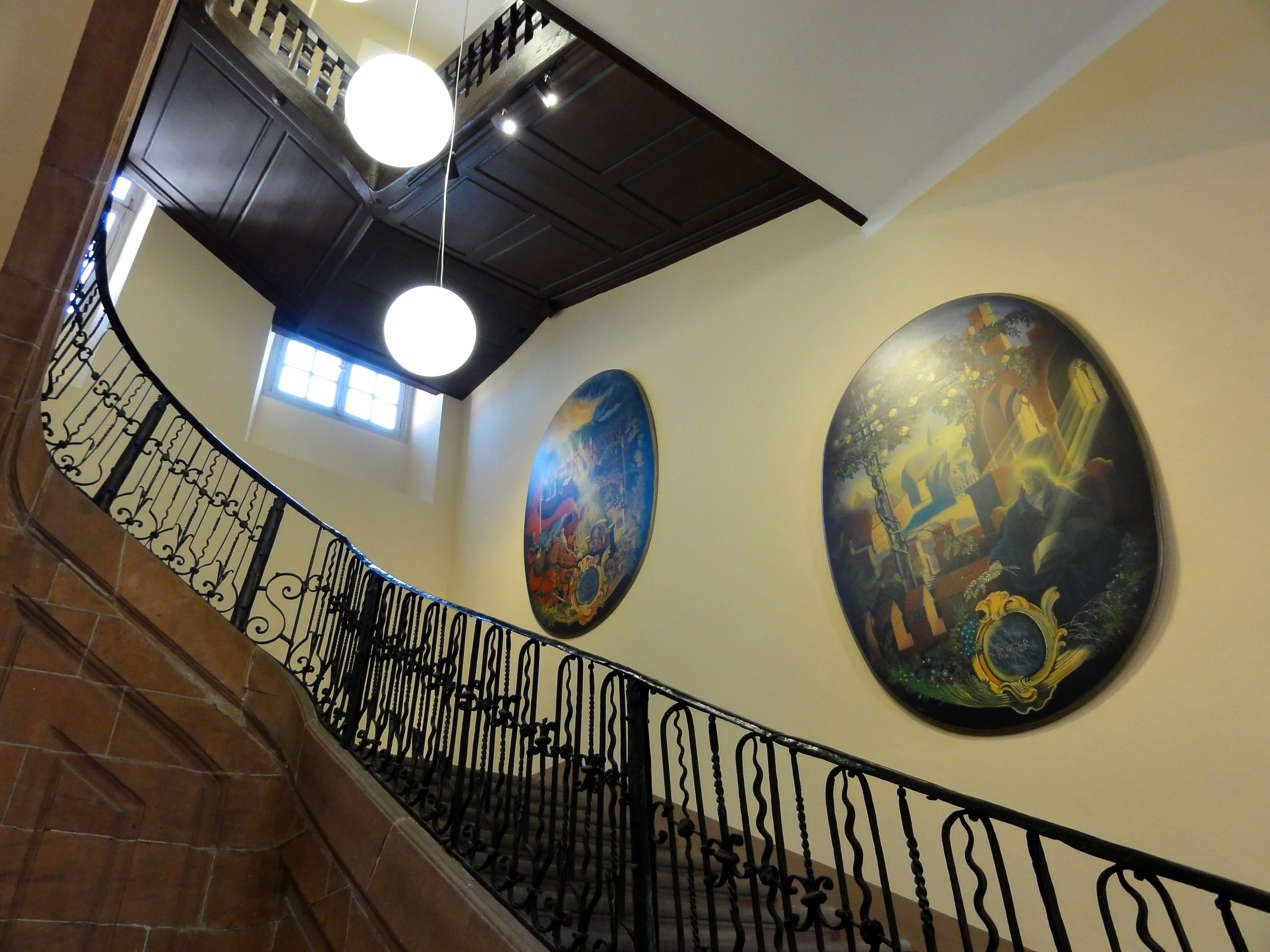
Staircase

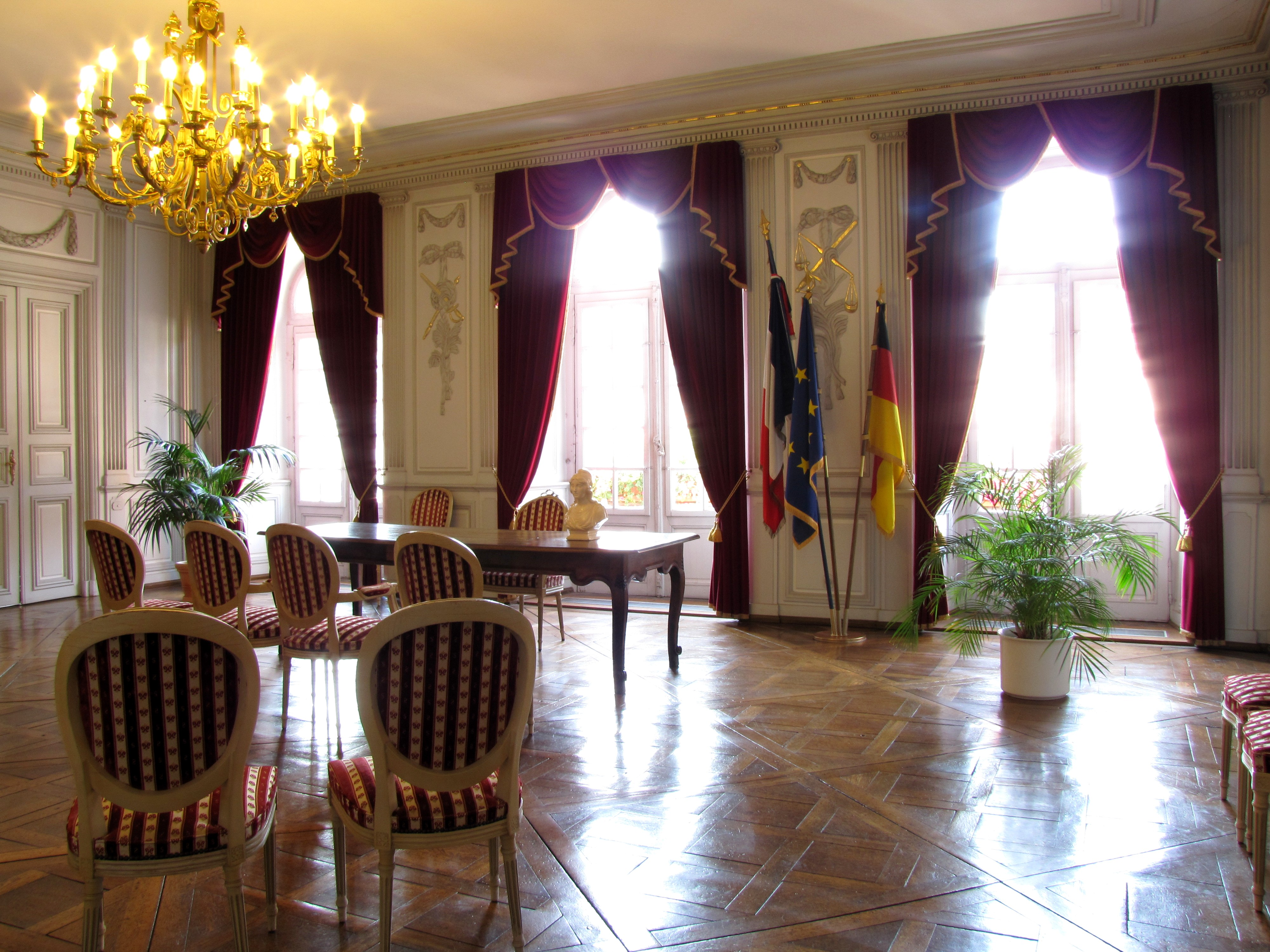
Wedding hall

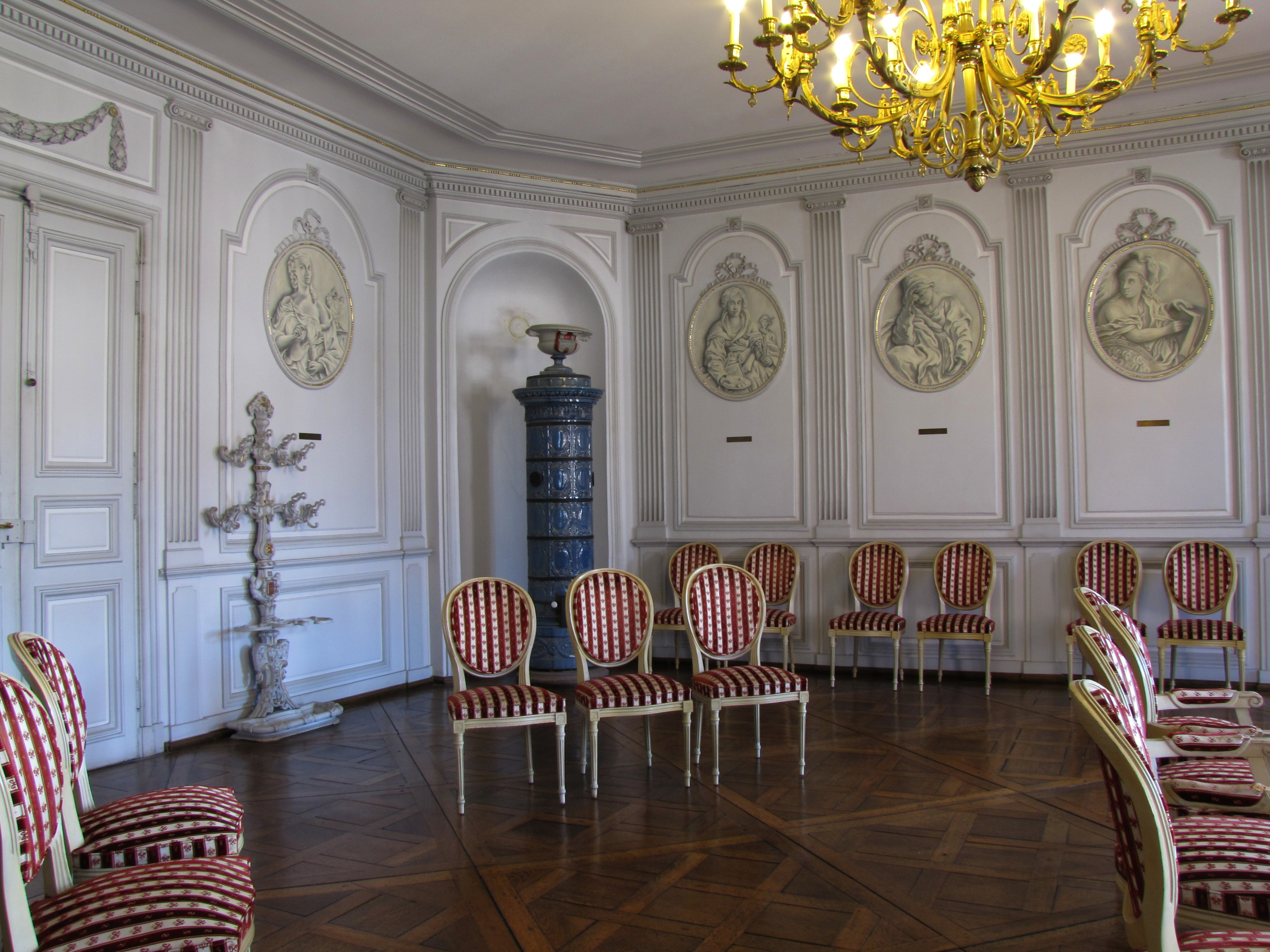
Wedding hall (opposite side)
