= Château Saint-Rémy d'Altenstadt =

Ruined castle in Wissembourg, France

Coordinates: 49.0267°N 7.9953°E

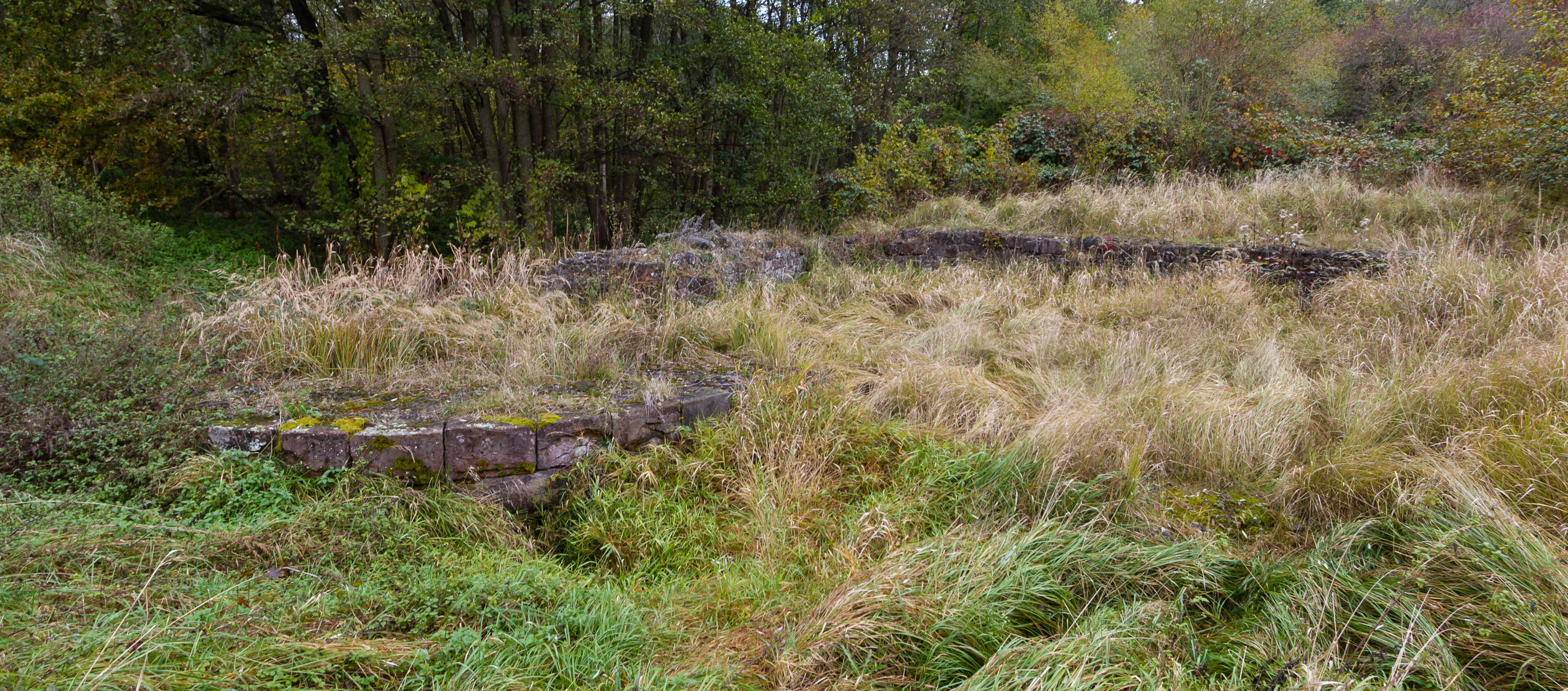
The remains of a former lowland castle of approximately trapezoidal complex with at least three round corner towers

Château Saint-Rémy d'Altenstadt is a ruined castle in the commune of Wissembourg, in the department of Bas-Rhin, Alsace, France. It was one of the four castles protecting the Wissembourg Abbey. It is a listed historical monument since 1989.
