= Joseph Massol =

Joseph Massol (born in Avignon on 15 October 1700; died in Strasbourg on 12 March 1771) was a French architect, mainly active in Strasbourg. He is notable for continuing Robert de Cotte's work on the bishop's palace in the city between 1728 and 1729, as architect to the bishop and the cathedral chapter. He produced designs for the hôtel de Klinglin for the royal prefect François-Joseph de Klinglin, but de Klinglin was dissatisfied with them and instead had it built by the city architect Jean-Pierre Pflug, though probably drew on Massol's plans. In 1758 Massol also built a wing (known as the 'aile d'intendance') and a new entrance gate for the hôtel de Klinglin, both now destroyed.

== Works ==
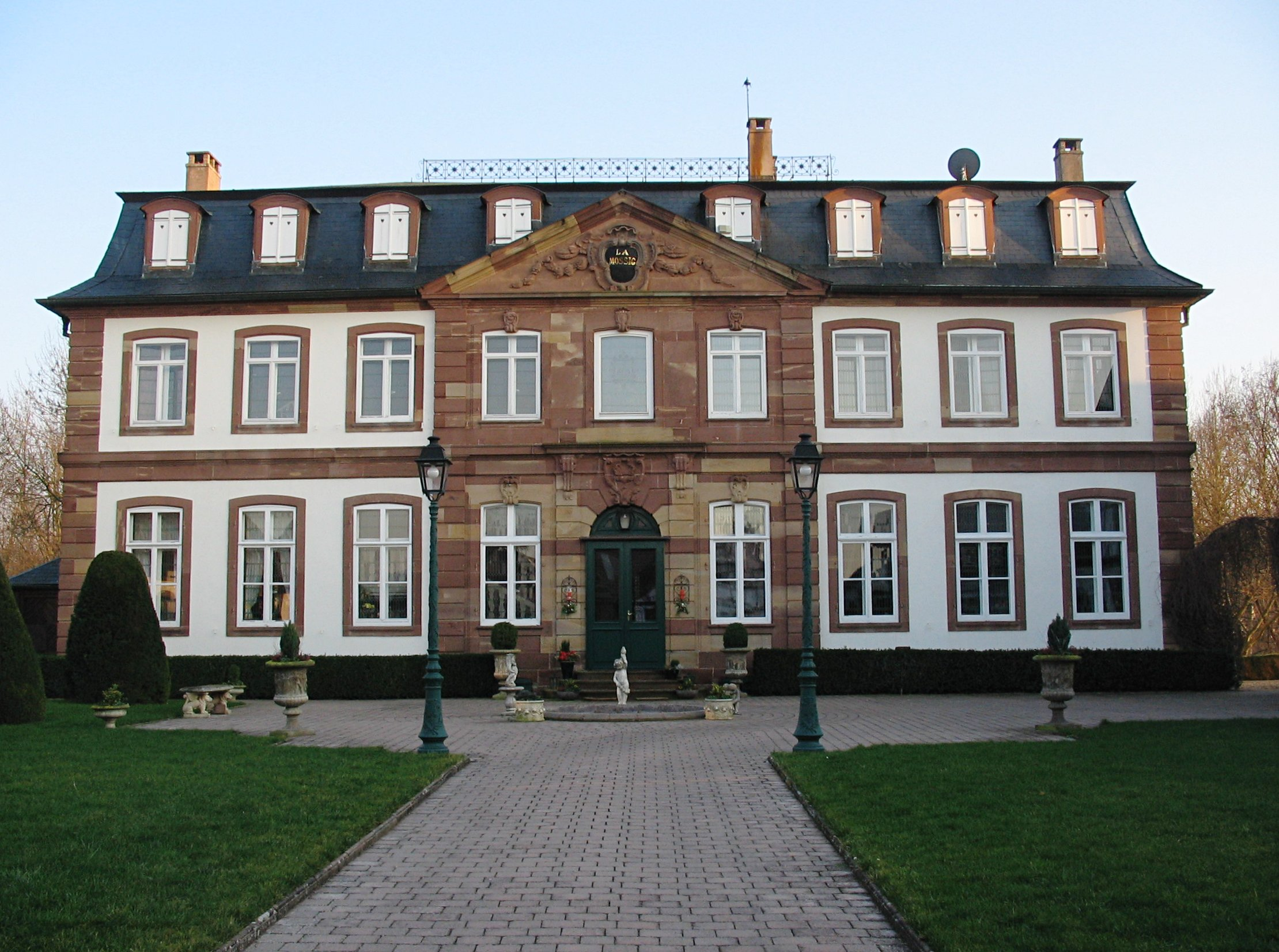
Façade of the château d'Odratzheim.

- Château d'Odratzheim
- Collège des Jésuites (now the Lycée Fustel-de-Coulanges)
- Grand Séminaire de Strasbourg
- Hôtel de Ville, Wissembourg
- Castle of the De Dietrich family in Reichshoffen
- Hôtel de Klinglin (now the hôtel de la préfecture)
- Hôtel de Hanau (now the Hôtel de Ville)
- Maison bourgeoise, Strasbourg, Rue des Juifs 36 (1750–1751)
- Palais du gouverneur militaire de Strasbourg
