= Château du Geisberg =

Château in Grand Est, France

Coordinates: 49.014°N 7.9538°E

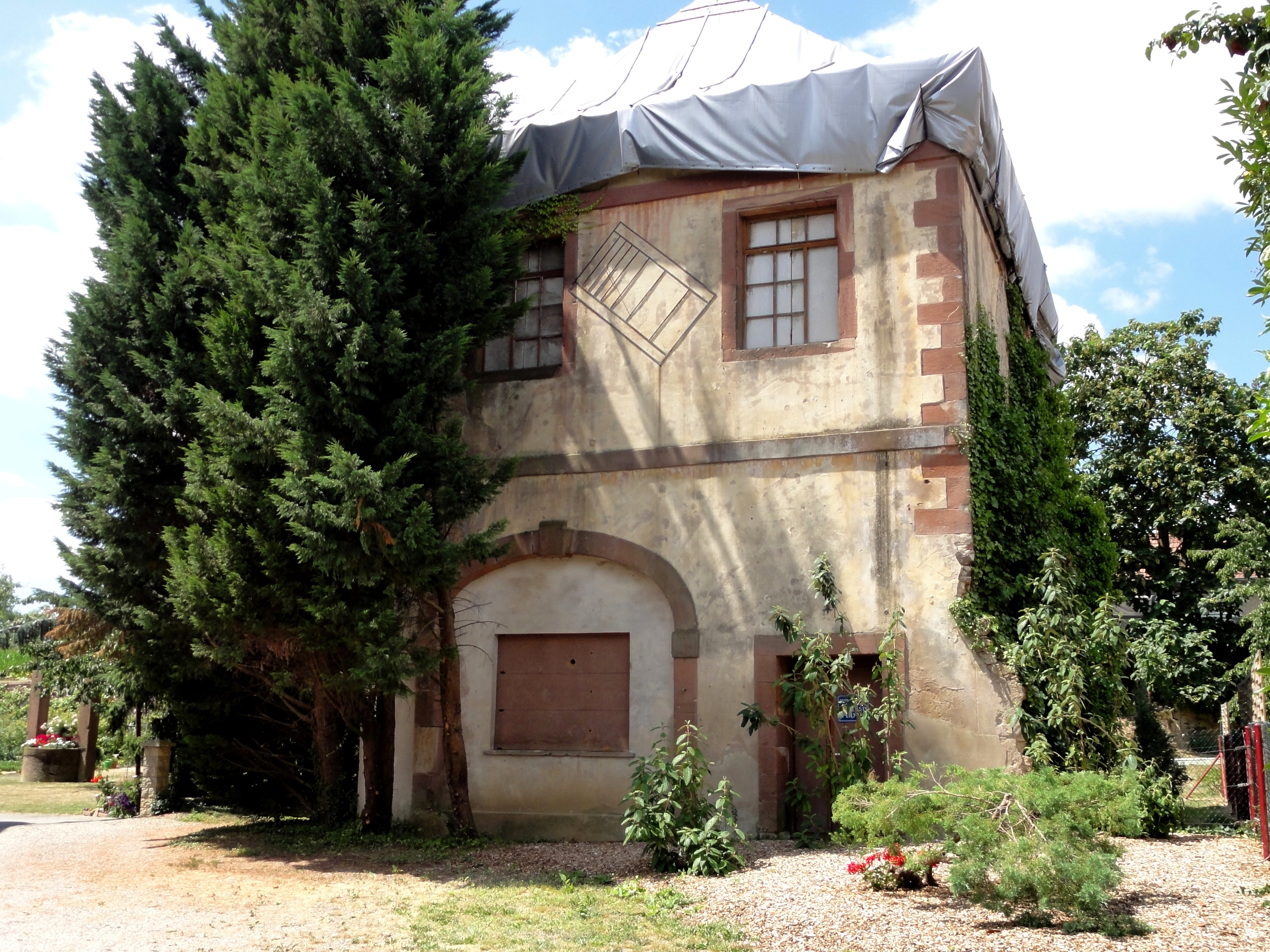

Location of Château du Geisberg in Alsace

The Château du Geisberg is a 17th/18th century residential chateau at Wissembourg, at the northern tip of Alsace.

The Château du Geisberg has been officially listed as a "Historic Edifice" since 1990: it is currently a private house.

== Location ==
The château is sited on a piece of raised land known as the "Geisberg Plateau" in a hamlet a half hour walk to the south of Wissembourg itself.

== History ==
The château and the plateau of the Geisberg acquired international significance at the end of 1793 as the scene of heavy fighting between the French Revolutionary Army and Austrian forces during the important Second Battle of Wissembourg. The Austrians, who were fighting as part of a Coalilition Army, lost the battle which enabled the revolutionaries to consolidate their hold over Alsace, where people had hitherto been divided in their response to the French Revolution.

German armies returned to Geisberg in August 1870 when the plateau around the château was again the scene of the heavy fighting between French forces and German armies, this time controlled by the Prussians. The French were poorly prepared, and on this occasion it was the Prussian side that won the opening battle of the Franco-Prussian War. The decisive Battle of Sedan was fought less than a month later.

Although international historians record each of these battles as a "Battle of Wissembourg", in France the appellation "Battle of Geisberg" is sometimes preferred.
