= Dominican Church, Wissembourg =

Church building located in Bas-Rhin, France

Coordinates: 49°02′10″N 7°56′51″E

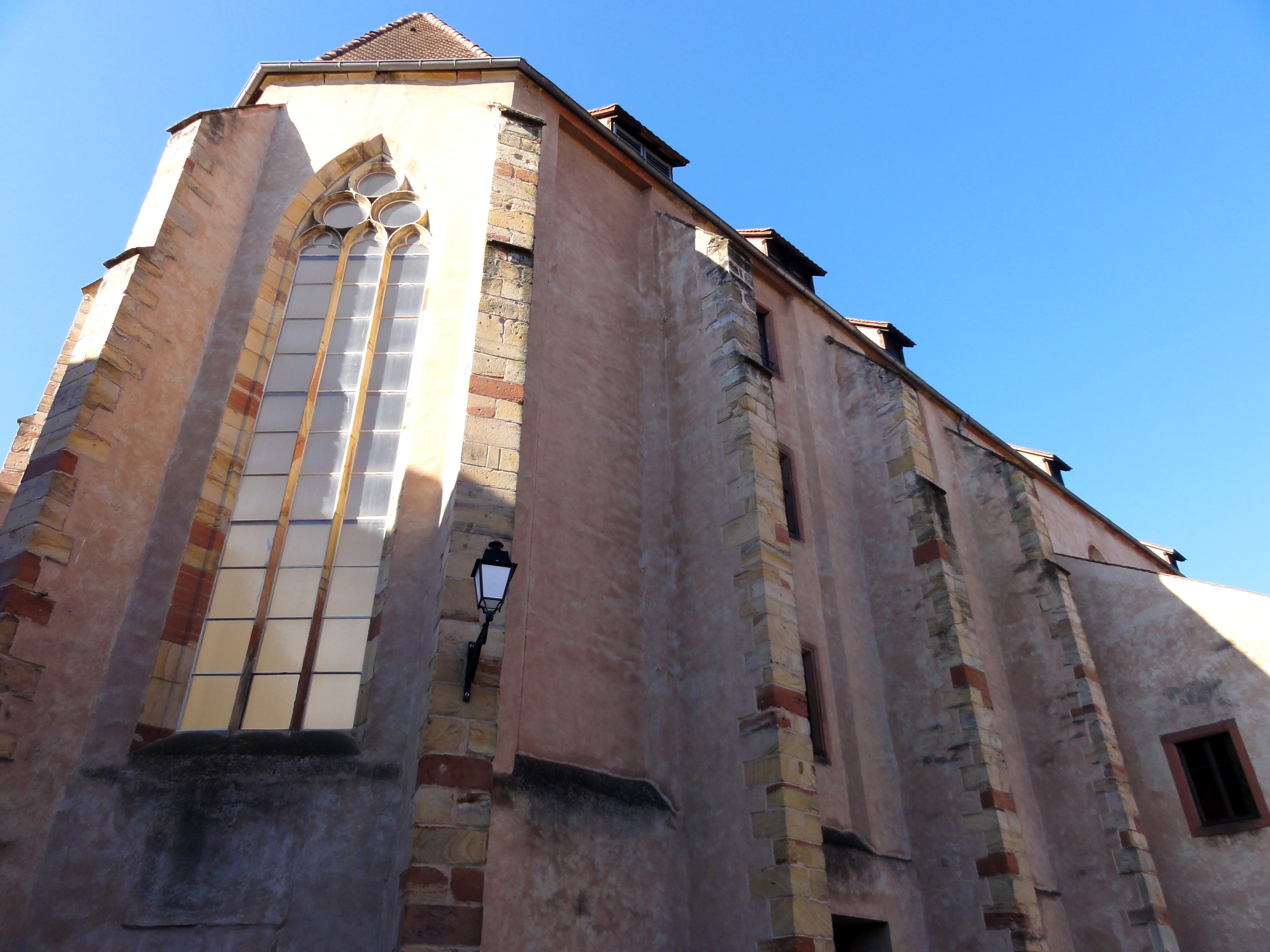
Dominican Church, Wissembourg

The Dominican Church, Wissembourg (French: Église des Dominicains de Wissembourg), is a church in Wissembourg, Bas-Rhin, Alsace, France, formerly the church of a dissolved Dominican priory. Built in 1288, it became a registered monument historique in 1982. It was rebuilt and since 1981 has served as the cultural center "La Nef" housing a mediathèque and a concert hall.
