= St. Peter and St. Paul's Church, Wissembourg =

Coordinates: 49°02′14″N 7°56′30″E

- Église Saints-Pierre-et-Paul; Abbatiale de Wissembourg
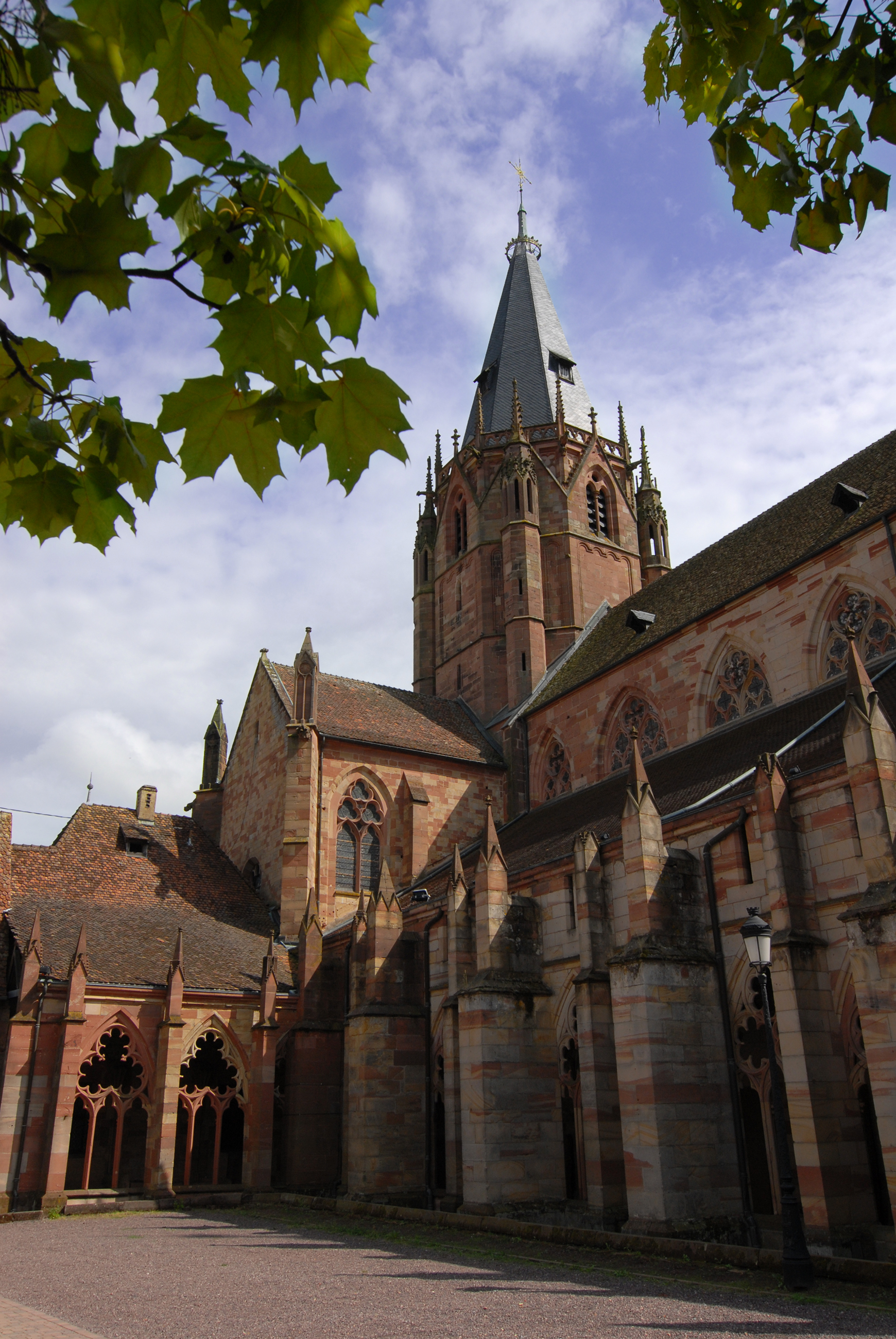
- St. Peter and St. Paul's Church, Wissembourg
- Location: Wissembourg
- Country: France
- Denomination: Roman Catholic

History
- Founded: 11th century

Architecture
- Heritage designation: Monument historique
- Designated: 1930
- Style: Romanesque; Gothic
- Completed: 14th century

Specifications
- Length: 60 m (200 ft) (inside)
- Width: 22 m (72 ft) (inside)

Administration
- Archdiocese: Strasbourg

St. Peter and St. Paul's Church (French: Église Saints-Pierre-et-Paul) of Wissembourg is frequently, but incorrectly, referred to as the second largest Gothic church of Alsace after Strasbourg Cathedral. However, the building, with its interior ground surface area of 1,320 square metres (14,200 sq ft) (60 by 22 metres (197 ft × 72 ft)) most probably is the second largest Gothic church in Bas-Rhin which is one of the two departments of the Alsace region.

== History ==
In 1524, the abbey, now entirely destitute, was turned into a secular collegiate church at the instigation of its last abbot, Rüdiger Fischer, which was then united with the Bishopric of Speyer in 1546. The former abbey church (abbatiale) of Wissembourg's famous Benedictine abbey now serves as the main Roman Catholic parish church of the town.

The church displays a Romanesque bell tower, the sole remain of the church built in the 11th century under the direction of abbot Samuel, and is thus a station on the Route Romane d'Alsace. The major part of the currently visible church is the work of builders under the command of abbot Edelin, in the late 13th century. During the 14th and 15th century, the church was richly decorated with stained glass, sculptures and mural paintings but only parts of the former abundance of works survived the vandalism which occurred during the French Revolution; of the surviving stained glass, what is not seen in the church itself can be found in Strasbourg's Musée de l’Œuvre Notre-Dame. The 6 m (20 ft) wide Romanesque crown chandelier representing the celestial Jerusalem and for which Wissembourg had been famous was also lost during that period; the currently visible chandelier is a 19th-century work.

The church contains a fresco representing Saint Christopher: with its height of 11 m (36 ft), it is the largest painted human figure on French territory.

Among the church's remaining treasures features a pipe organ, built by Louis Dubois in 1766 in one of the largest baroque organ cases in Alsace. When this organ had become barely playable, another organ was installed in the south transept in 1953, in a design typical of its time. The Dubois organ was restored in its (almost) original state between 2010 and 2012.

Located in the south transept of the abbey, the new organ, built by Roethinger on the principles and aesthetics of the 1950s was taken up in 1989 by Yves Koenig. It remained totally authentic and is therefore a valuable witness of the organ building at the middle of the twentieth century.

A spacious and ornate but unfinished 15th century cloister in Late Gothic style and an adjacent Romanesque Chapter house (12th century) now serving as a lateral chapel are the only other remains of the monastery where Otfrid of Weissenburg once studied and taught.

== Gallery ==
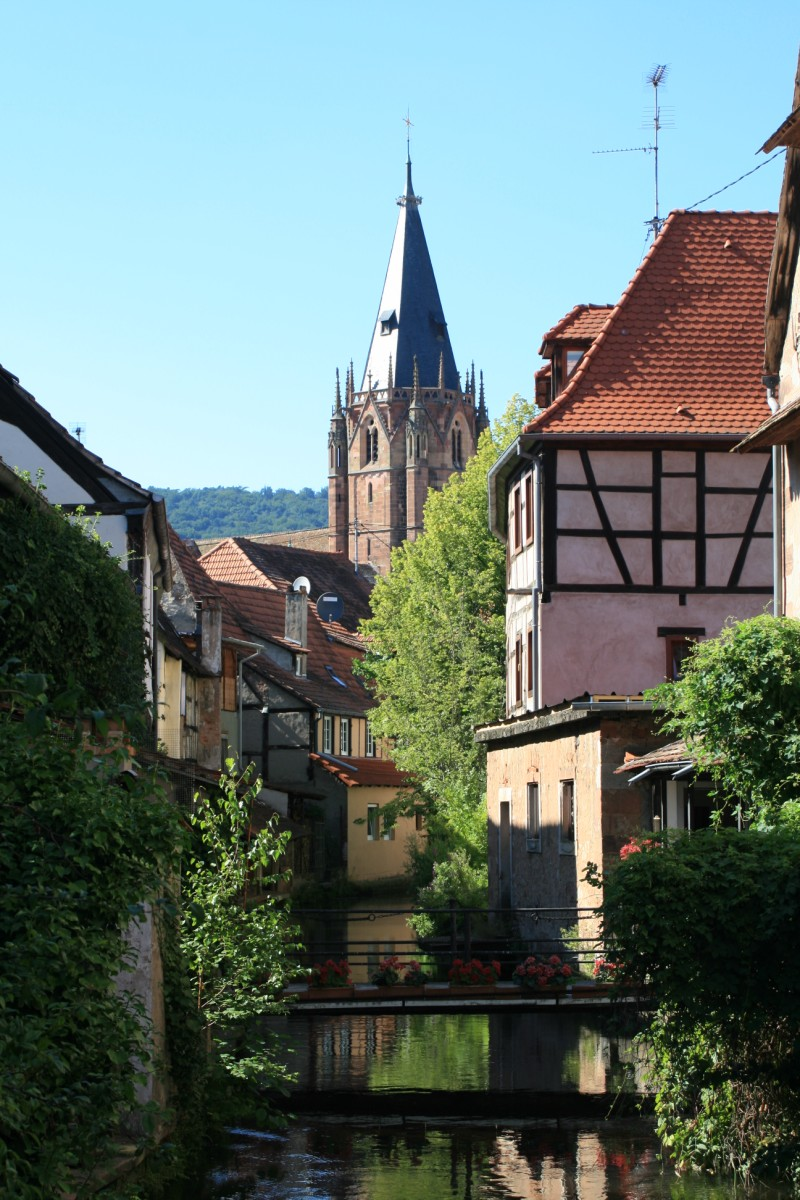
Seen from a distance

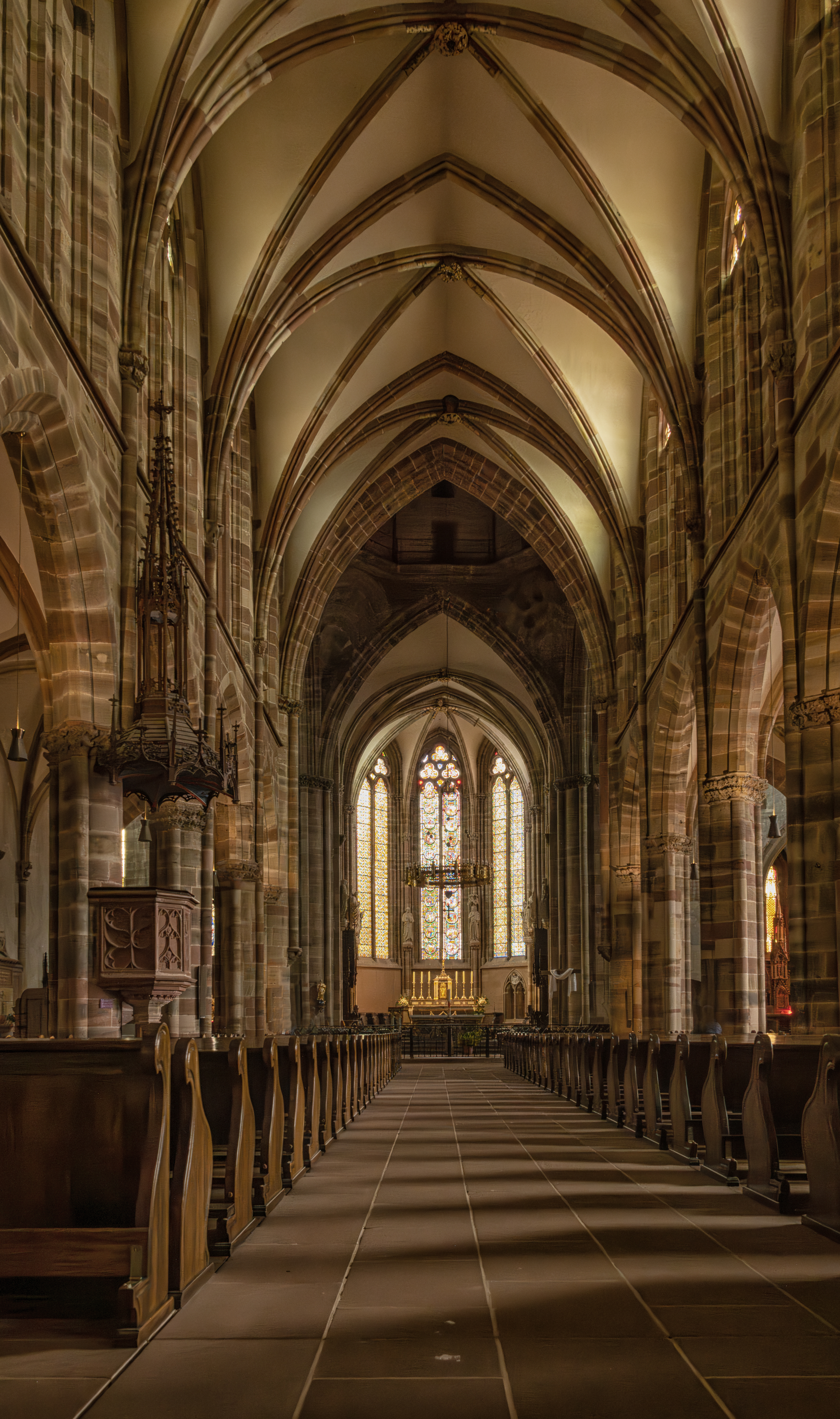
Interior

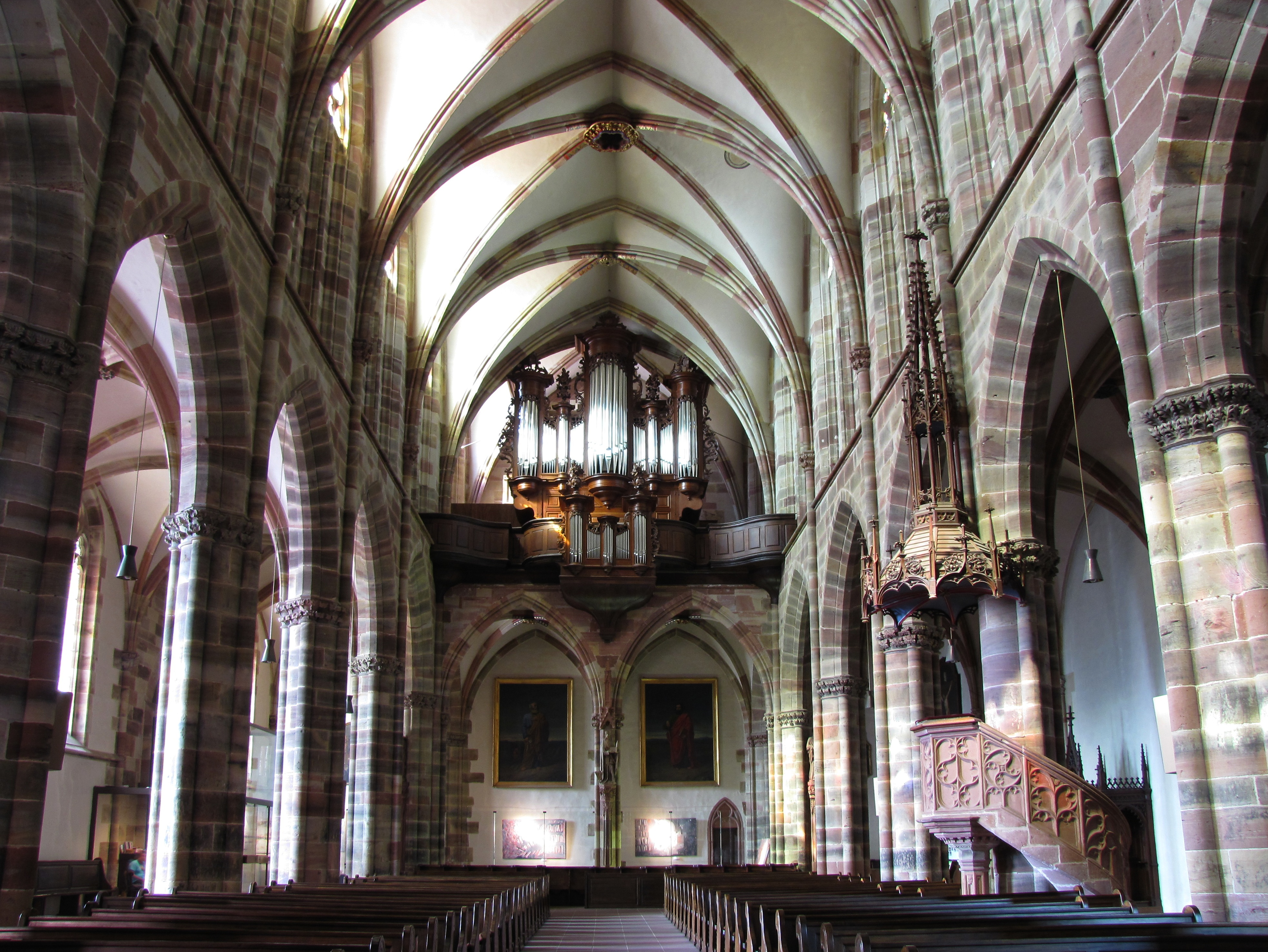
Other inside view

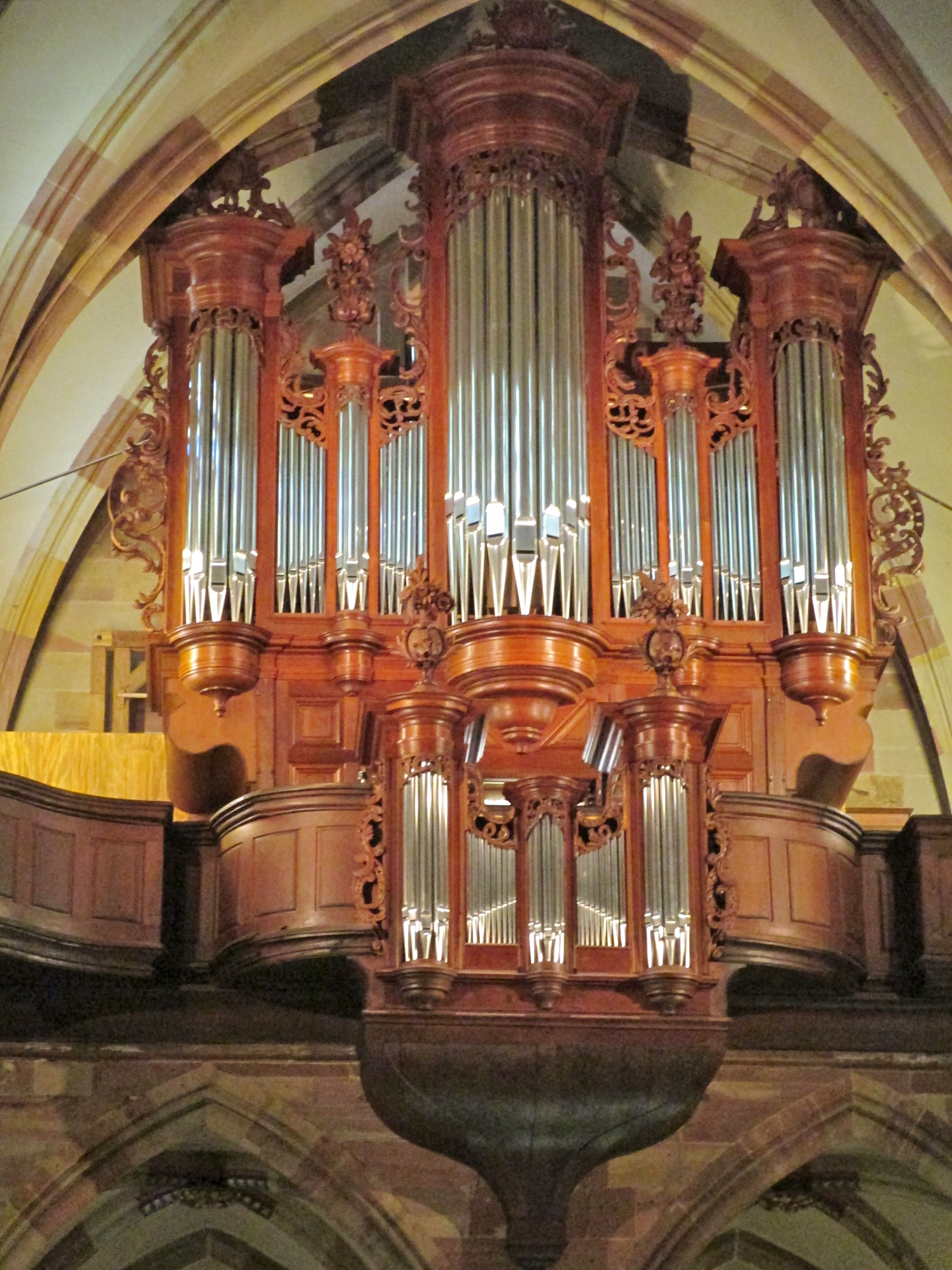
The Dubois organ (1766)

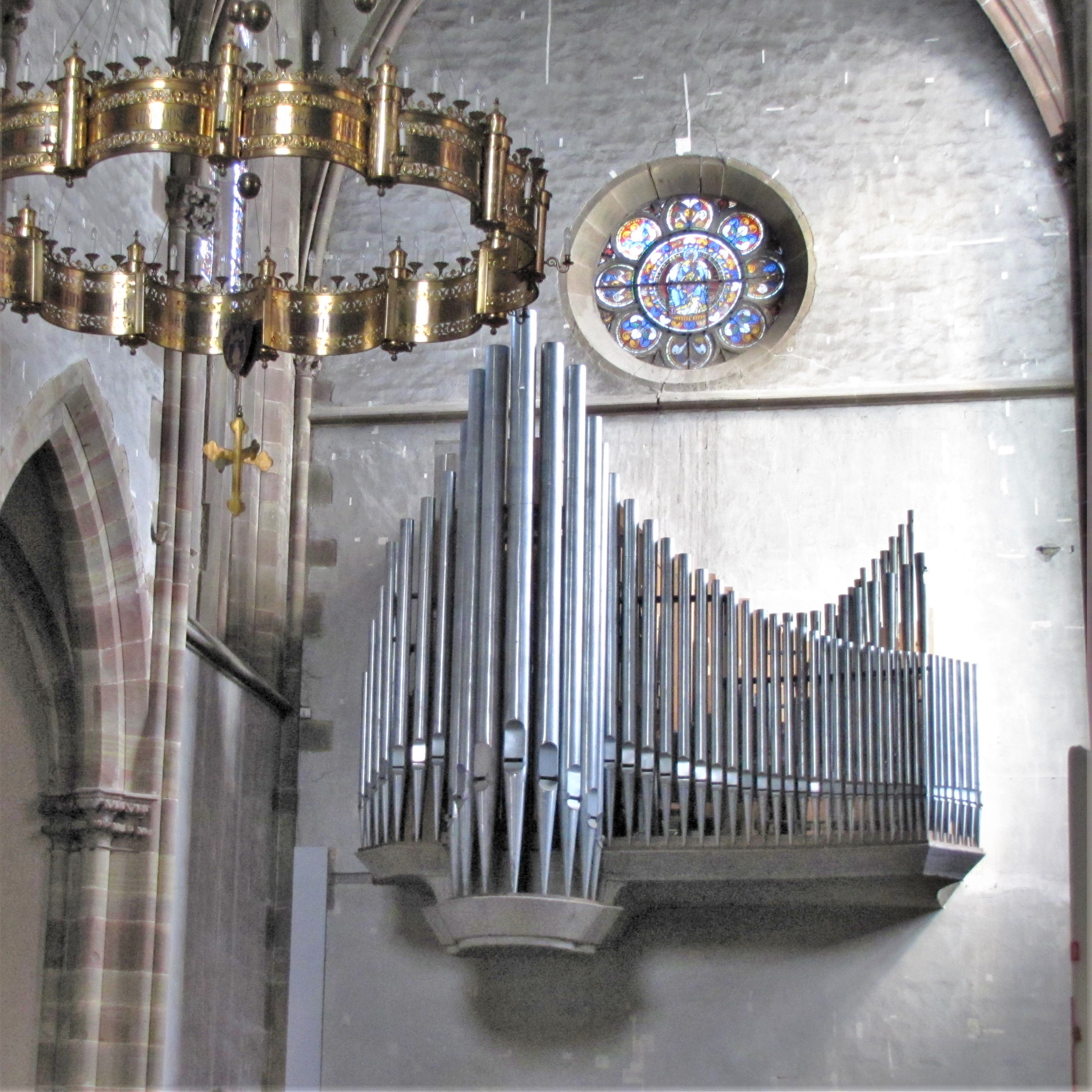
The Roethinger organ (1953)

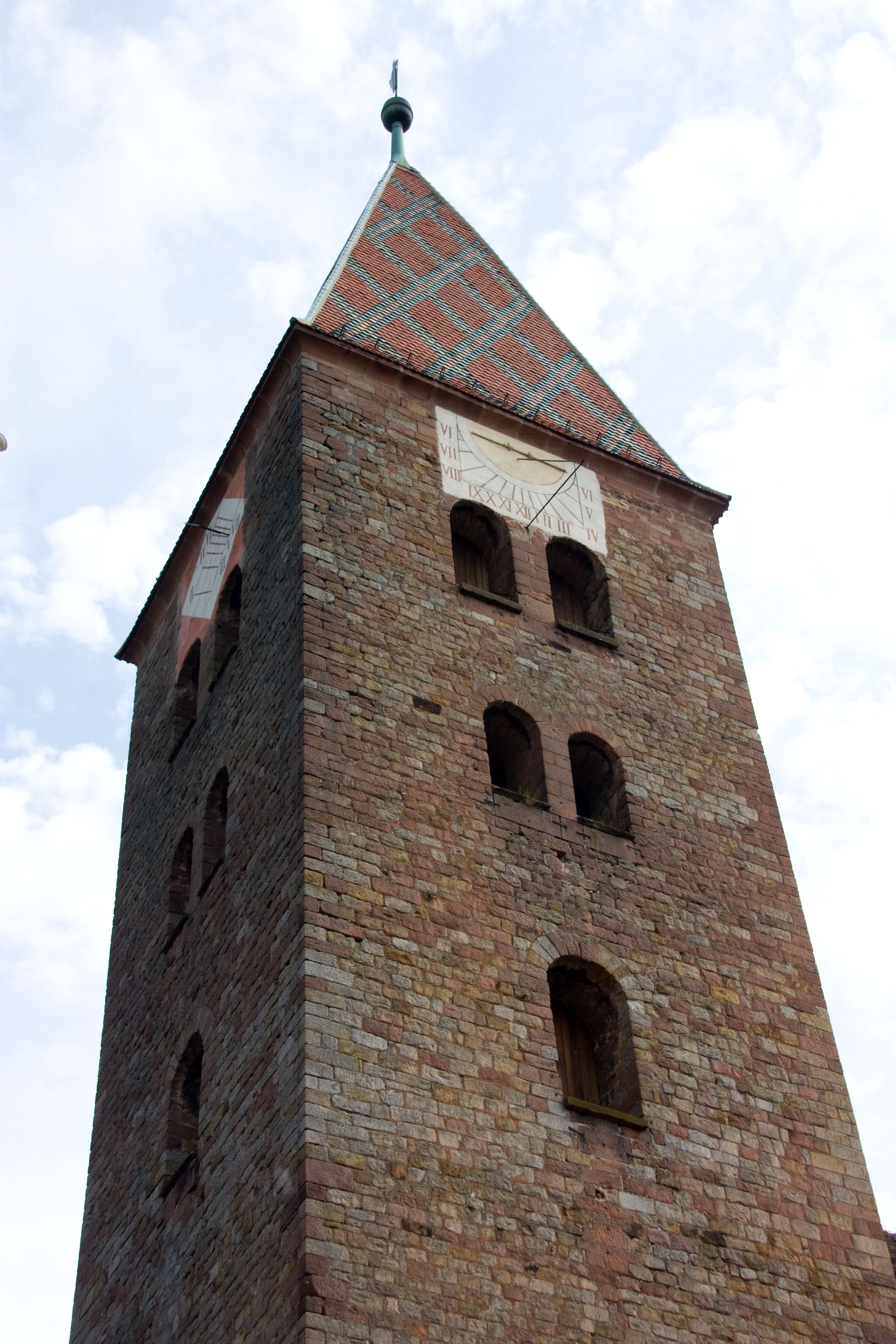
Romanesque bell tower

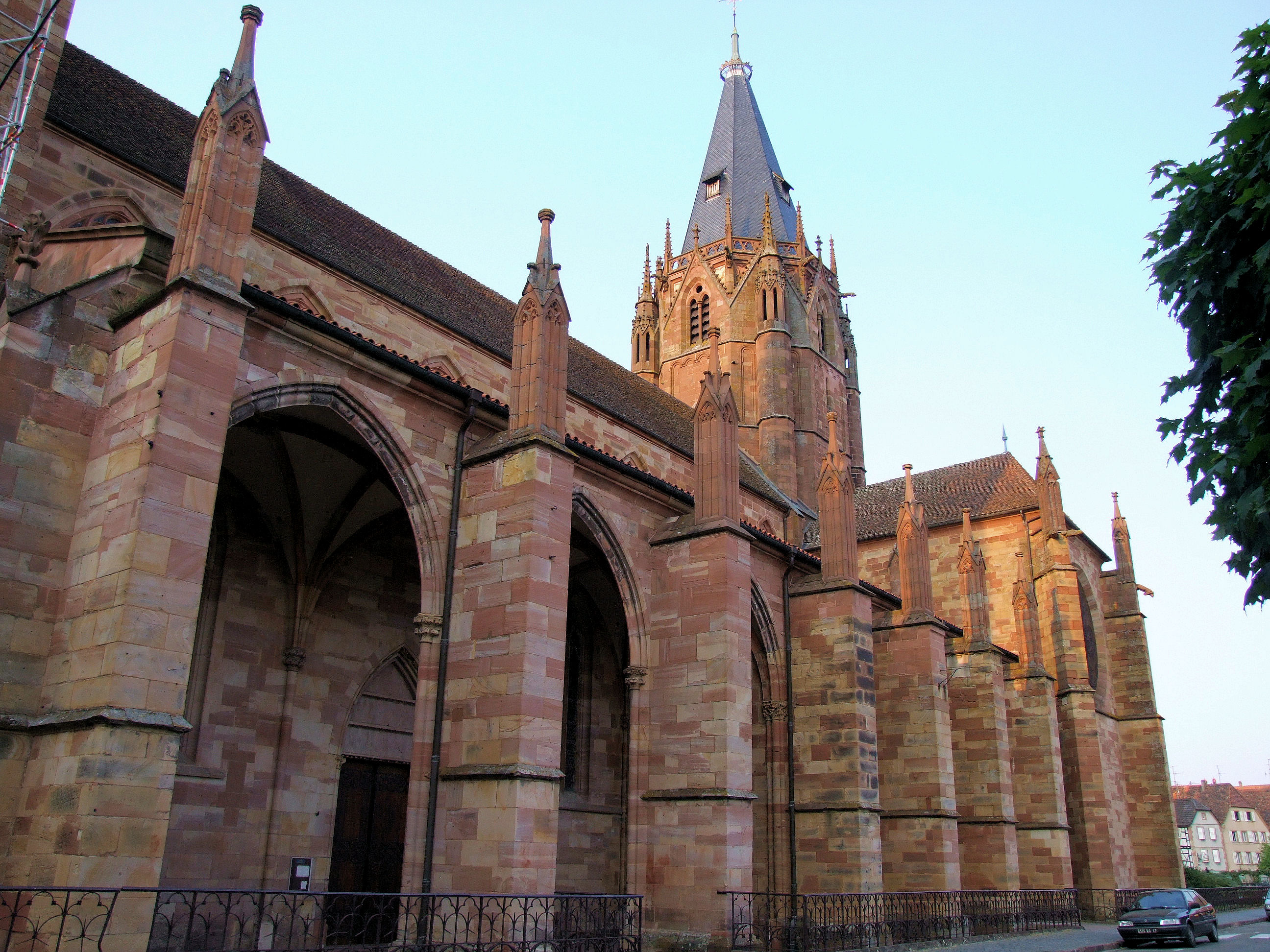
Porch of main entrance

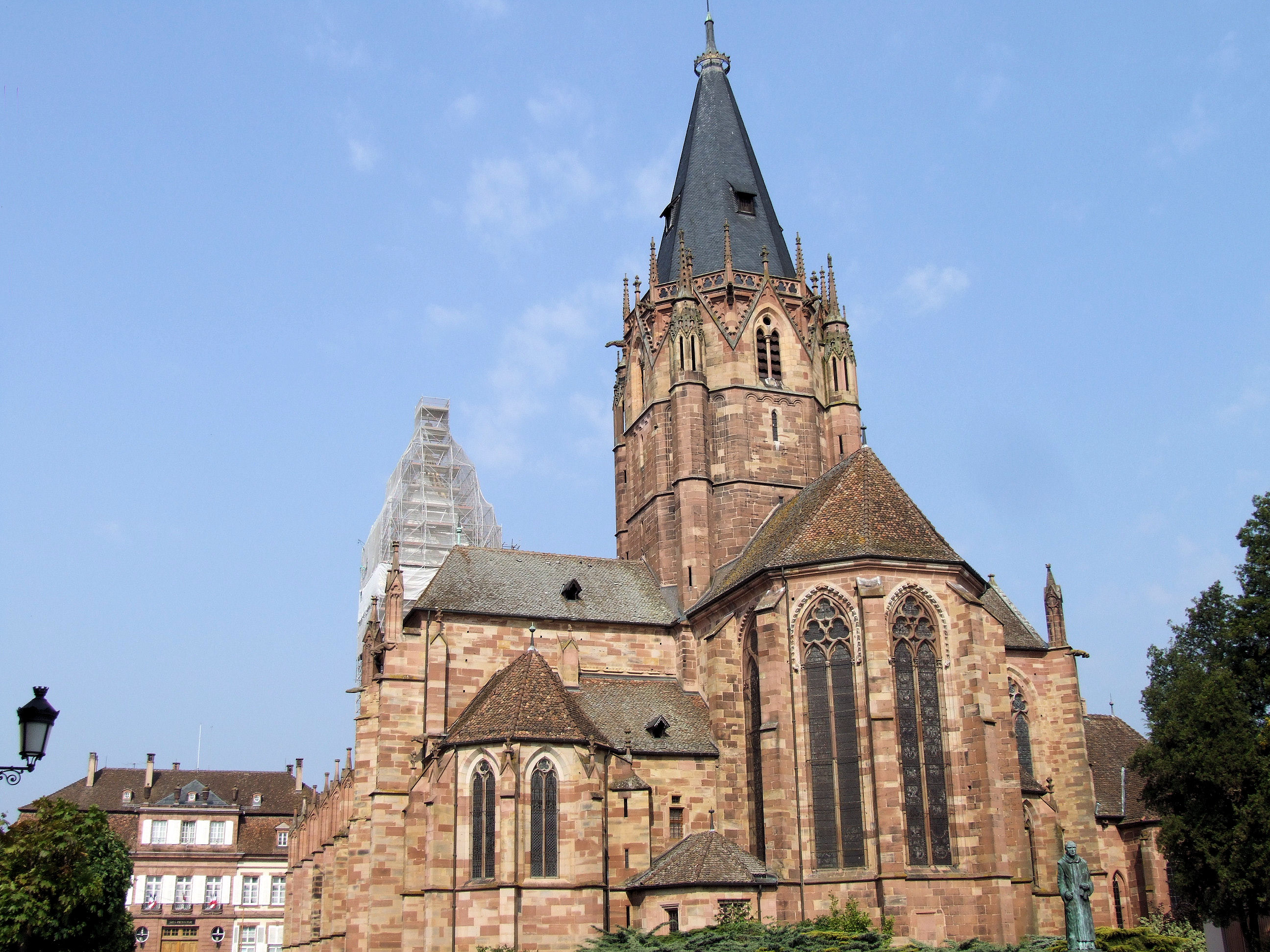
Rear view

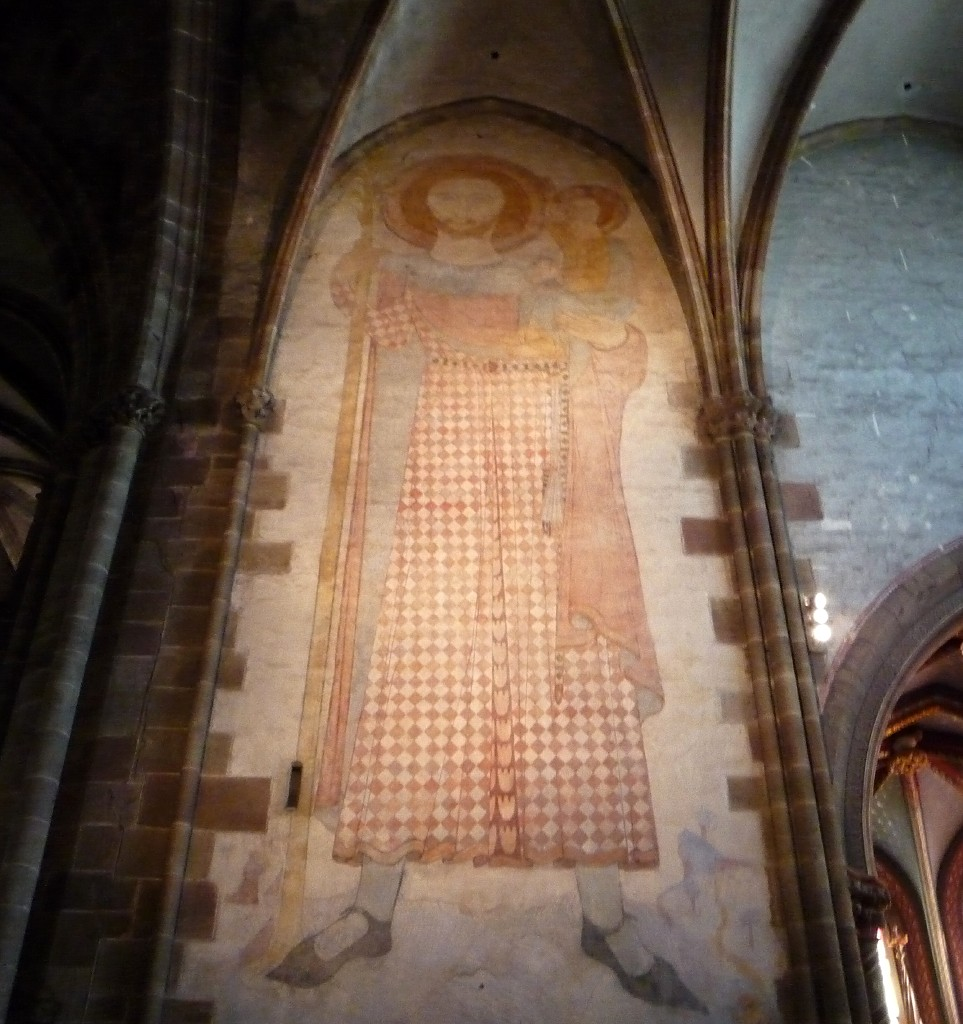
Saint Christopher

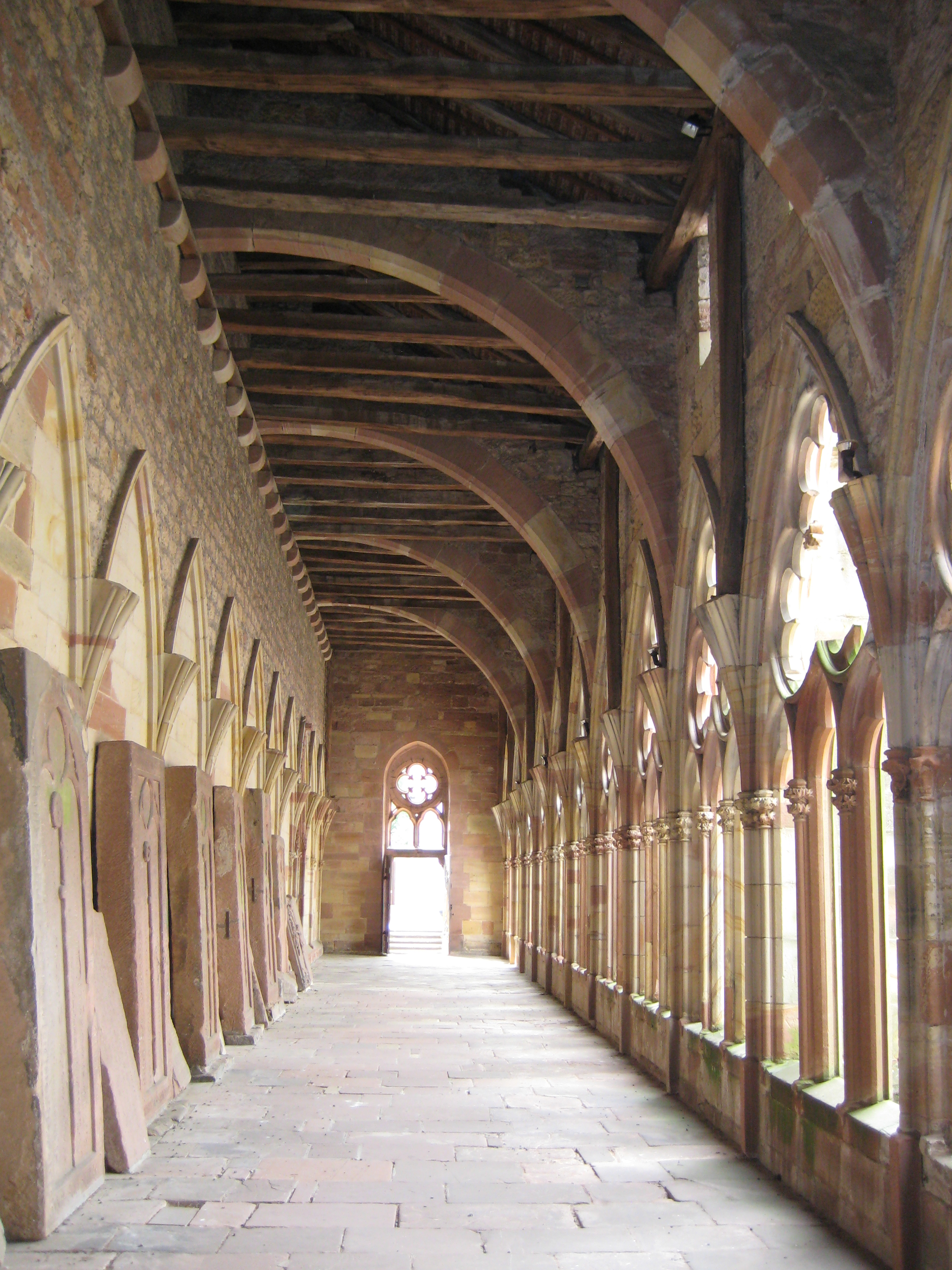
The unfinished cloister
