= Odratzheim =

- Commune
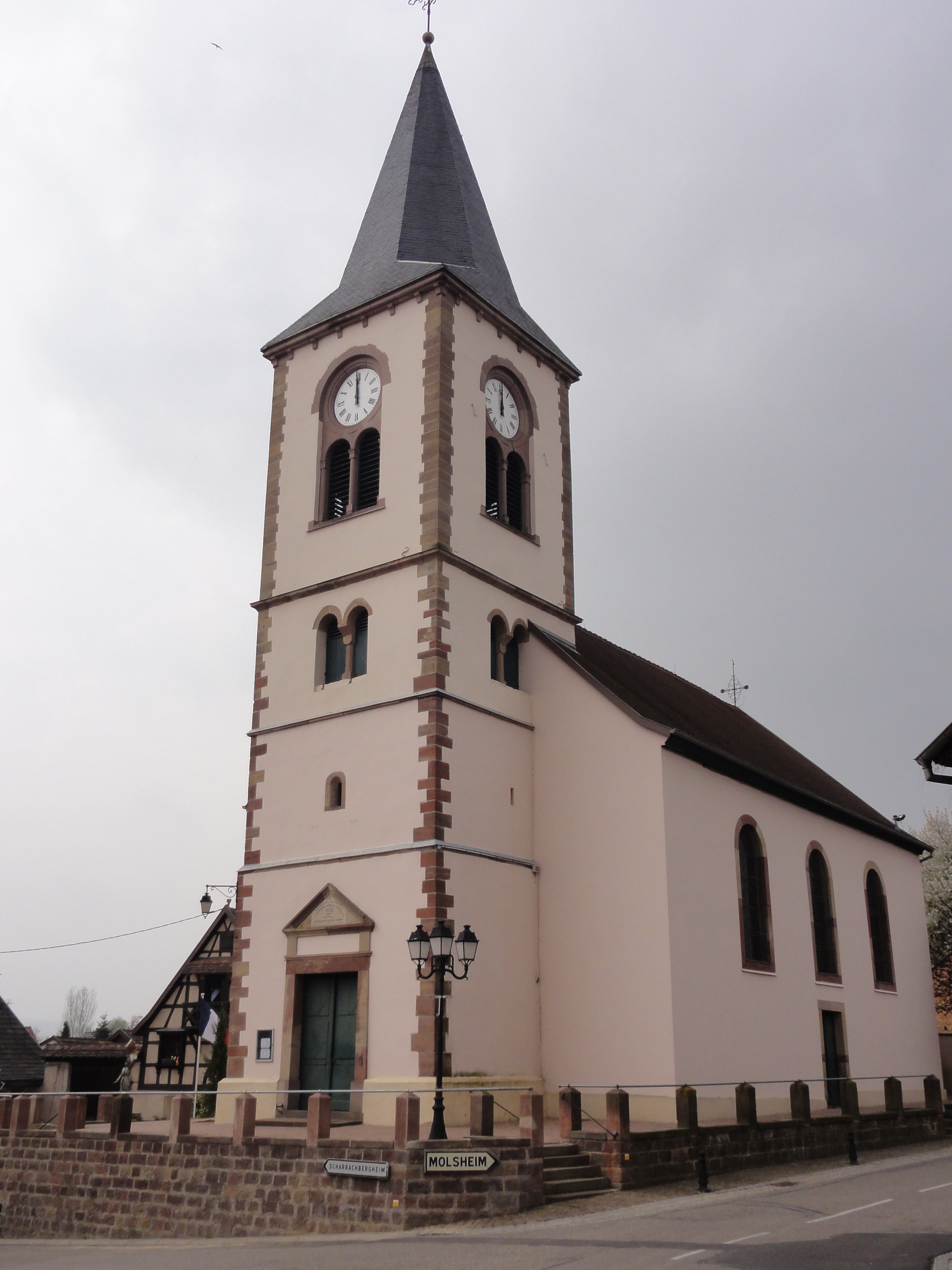
- The church in Odratzheim

- Coat of arms
- Location of Odratzheim
- Location within France Location within Grand Est
- Coordinates: 48°36′04″N 7°29′22″E
- Country: France
- Region: Grand Est
- Department: Bas-Rhin
- Arrondissement: Molsheim
- Canton: Molsheim

Government
  - Mayor (2020–2026): François Jehl
- Area^{1}: 1.54 km^{2} (0.59 sq mi)
- Highest elevation: 246 m (807 ft)
- Lowest elevation: 174 m (571 ft)
- Population (2023): 518
  - Density: 336/km^{2} (871/sq mi)
- Time zone: UTC+01:00 (CET)
  - Summer (DST): UTC+02:00 (CEST)
- INSEE/Postal code: 67354 /67520
- ^{1} French Land Register data, which excludes lakes, ponds, glaciers > 1 km^{2} (0.386 sq mi or 247 acres) and river estuaries.

Odratzheim (French pronunciation: [odʁatsaim]; German: Odrazheim; Alsatian: Oderze) is a commune in the Bas-Rhin department in Grand Est in north-eastern France.

== See also ==
- Communes of the Bas-Rhin department
