= Episcopal Palace, Strasbourg =

Episcopal Palace
- Palais épiscopal, Palais de l'archevêché
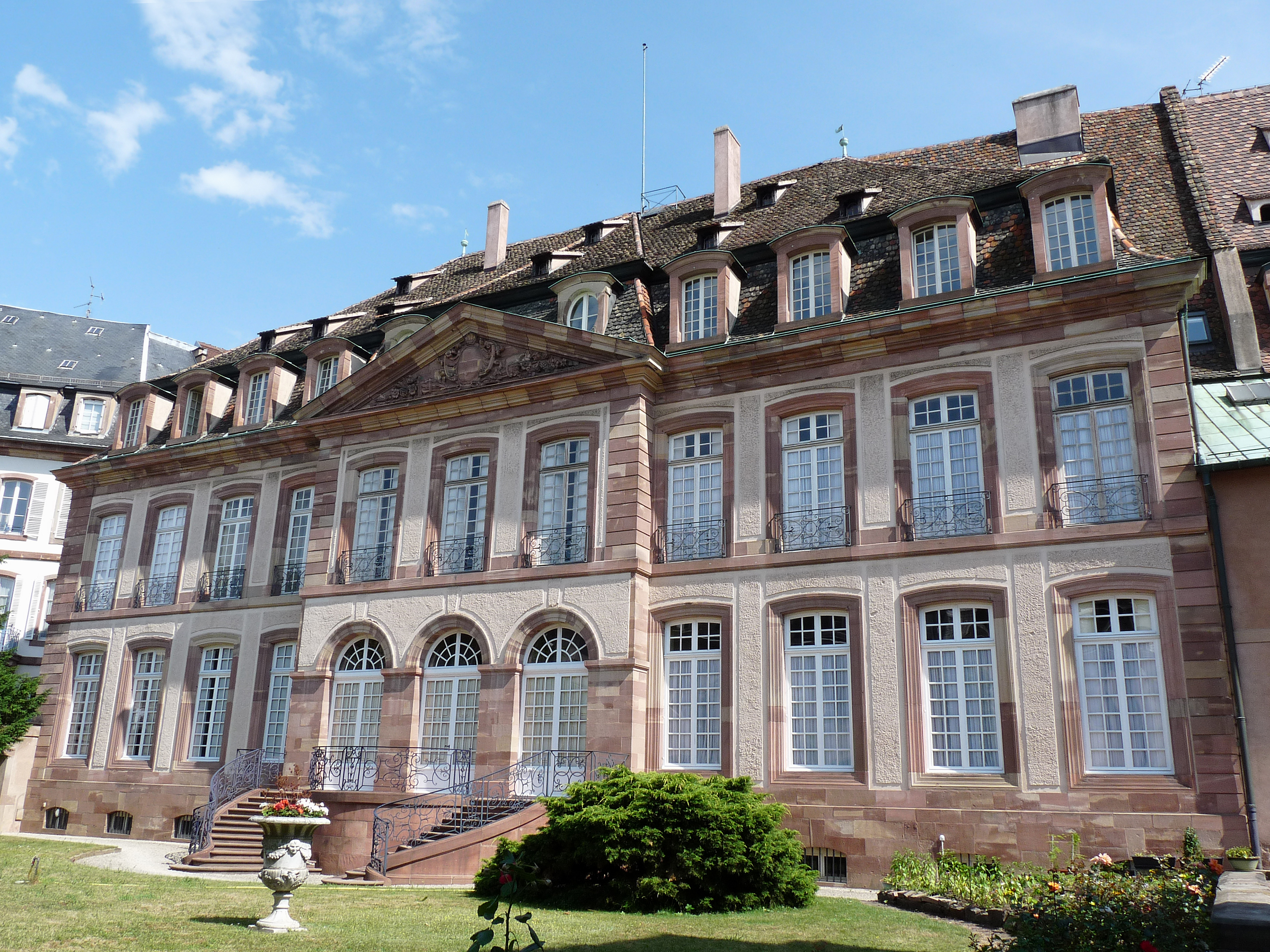
- Façade and garden on the Rue Brûlée

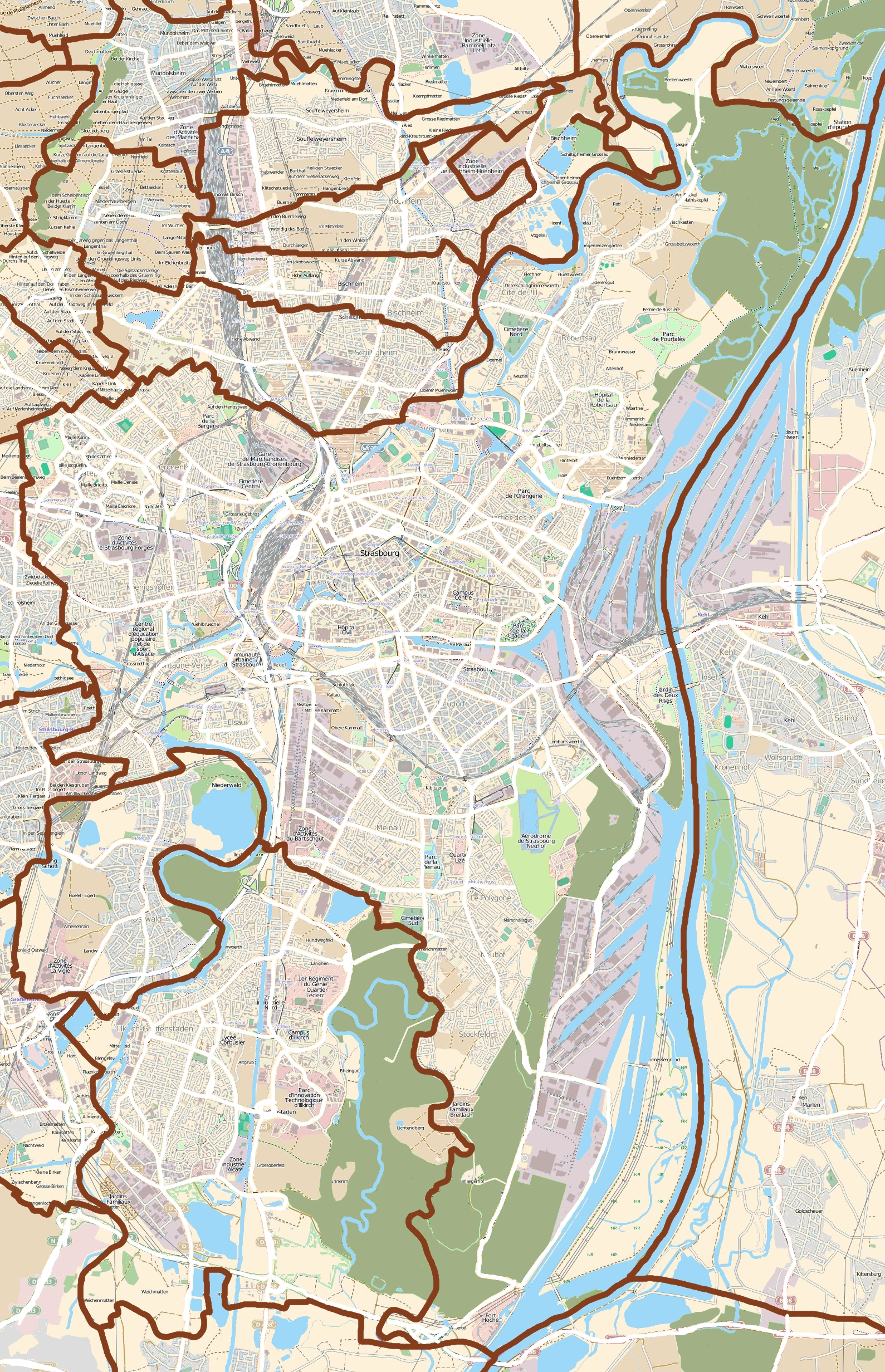
- Location within Strasbourg
- Former names: Hôtel du grand Doyenné

General information
- Type: Palace
- Architectural style: Baroque
- Location: Strasbourg, France
- Coordinates: 48°35′04.62″N 7°45′11.12″E
- Current tenants: Archbishop of Strasbourg
- Construction started: 1724
- Completed: 1732
- Owner: Roman Catholic Archdiocese of Strasbourg

Design and construction
- Architects: Robert de Cotte, Auguste Malo-Saussard

The Episcopal Palace (French: Palais épiscopal), formerly known as the Hôtel du grand Doyenné, is the seat of the Archdiocese of Strasbourg. A French Baroque hôtel particulier of the 1720s, it is located between the Rue du Parchemin and the Rue Brûlée, near the Place Broglie, on the Grande Île, the historic city center of Strasbourg, in the French department of the Bas-Rhin, Alsace. It has been classified as a monument historique since 1929.

== History ==
The palace was built for the Dean of the Grand Chapter of Strasbourg Cathedral, Frédéric Constantin de La Tour d'Auvergne (1682–1732) of the House of La Tour d'Auvergne, between 1724 (1722, according to other sources) and 1732 (1731, 1733 or 1734 according to other sources). It was thus called Hôtel du grand Doyenné. The plans were provided by Robert de Cotte, who would later design the Palais Rohan. The executive architect was Auguste Malo-Saussard (born 1690, last recorded alive in 1737; sometimes written Malo Auguste Saussard). The Hôtel du grand Doyenné was the first of the many stately 18th-century hôtels particuliers of Strasbourg and served as a structural model to most: two ornate façades (here of almost identical design), a grand portal, a large courtyard, a small garden.

During the French Revolution (1789), the Hôtel du grand Doyenné was confiscated and declared state-owned (bien public), before being bought by Marshal Luckner. After changing hands a few more times, the hôtel became the property of the Catholic Church in 1855. It became the residence and workplace of the Bishop of Strasbourg (since 1988: Archbishop of Strasbourg) the same year.

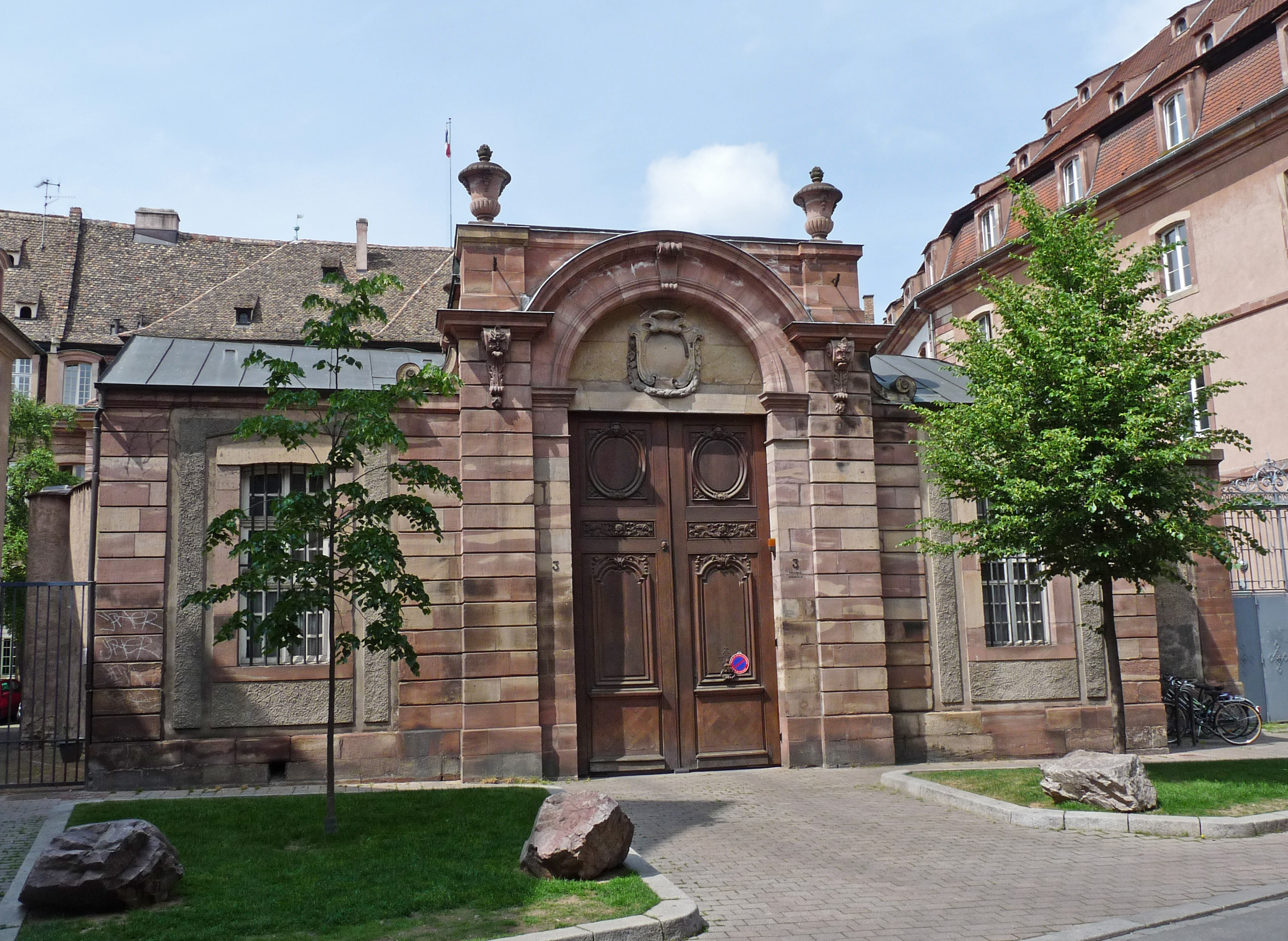
Grand portal on the Rue du Parchemin

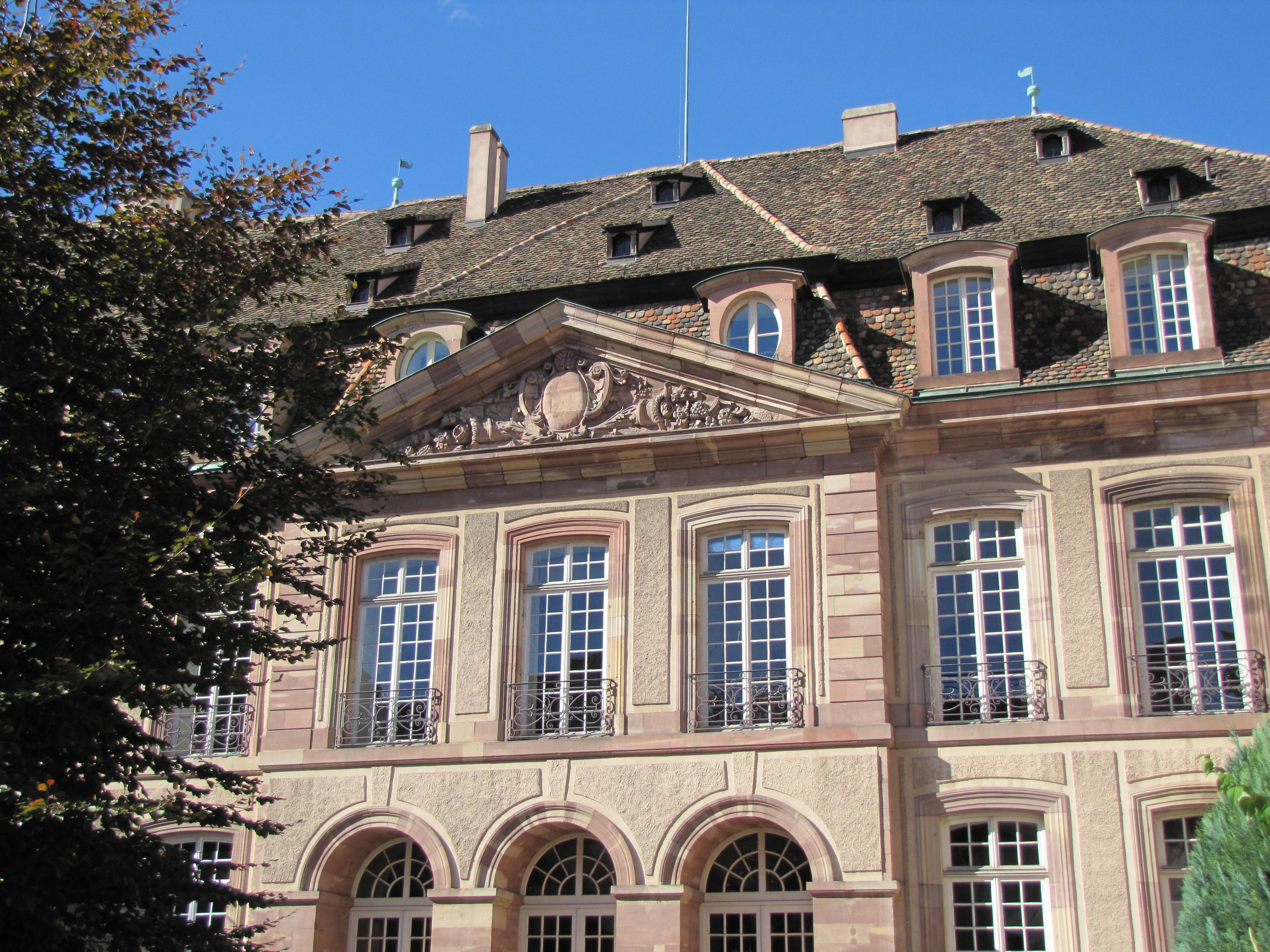
Courtyard façade

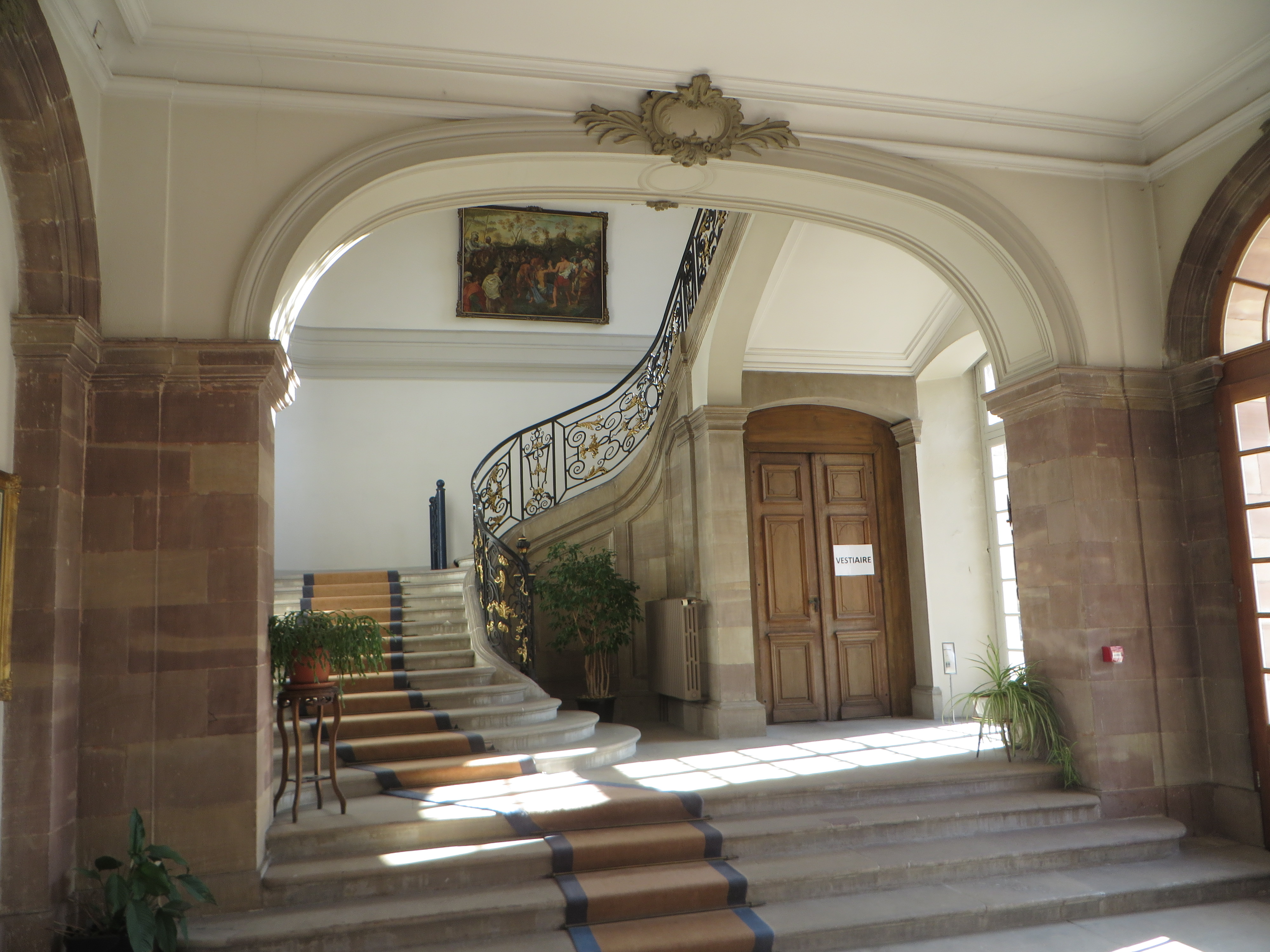
Grand staircase – lower part

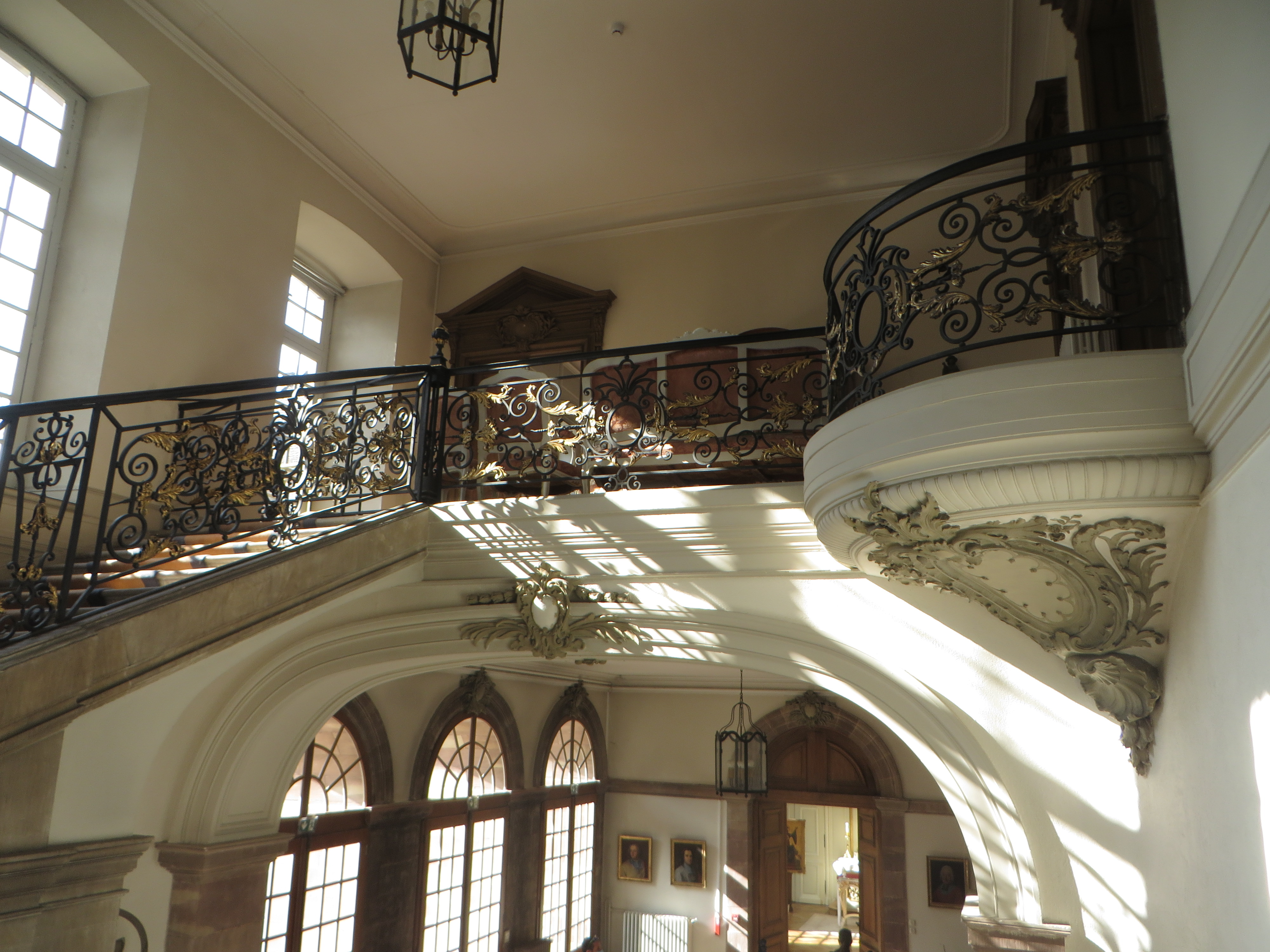
Grand staircase – upper part

== Literature ==
- Recht, Roland; Foessel, Georges; Klein, Jean-Pierre: Connaître Strasbourg, 1988, ISBN 2-7032-0185-0, pages 120–121

== See also ==
- Hôtel de Hanau
- Hôtel des Deux-Ponts
- Hôtel de Klinglin
