= Hôtel de Klinglin =

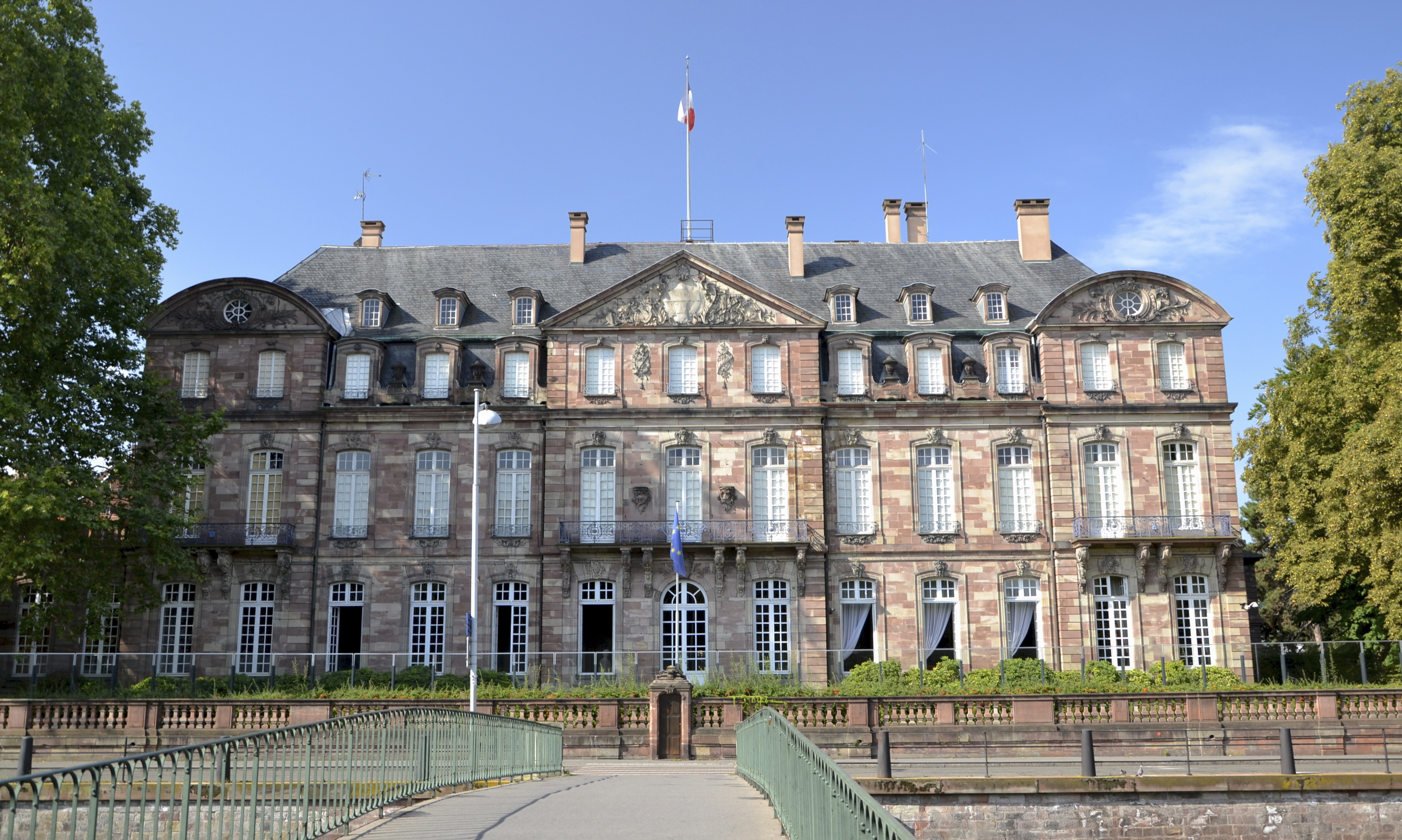
- Façade on the Ill

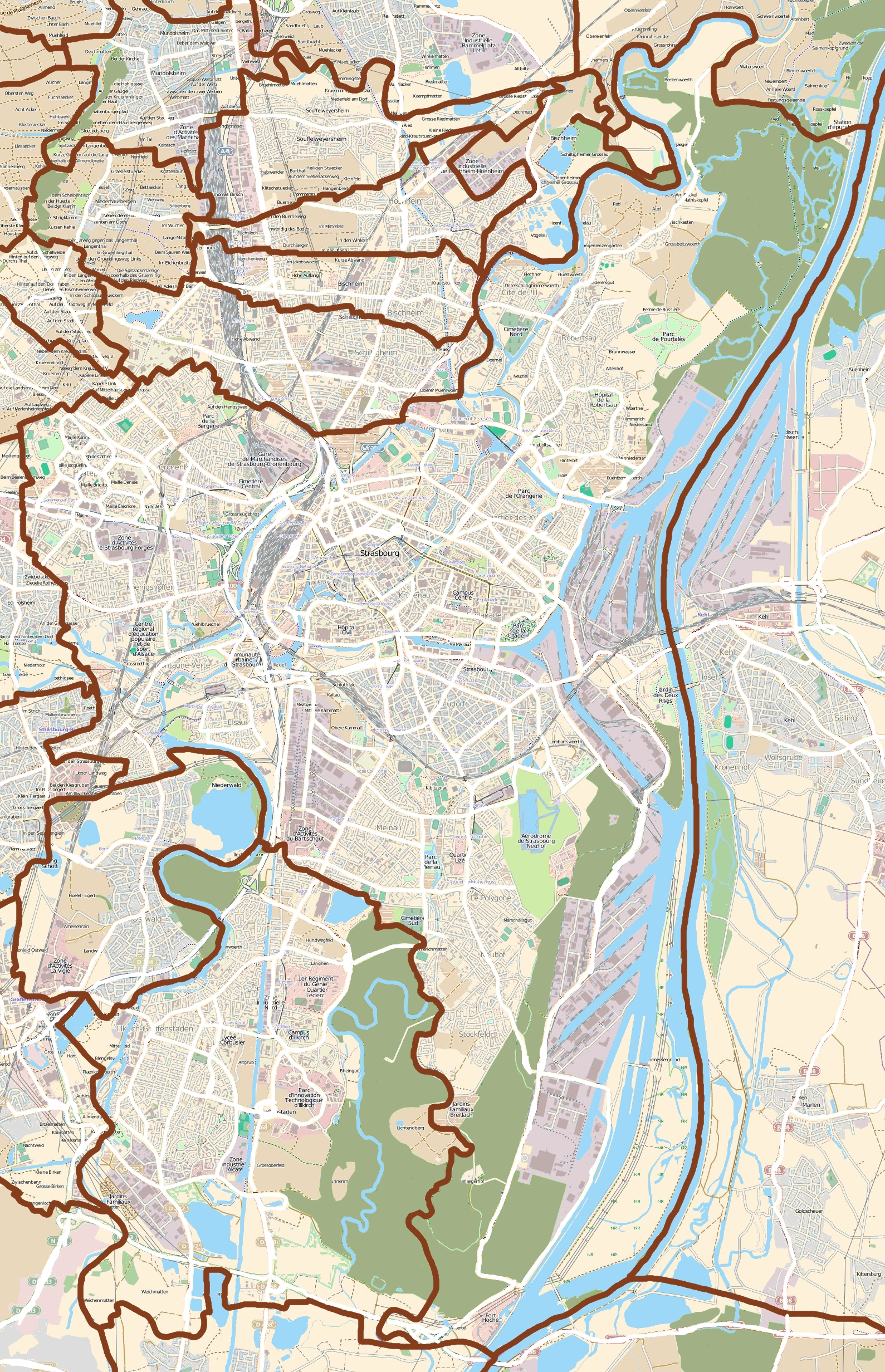
- Location within Strasbourg
- Alternative names: Hôtel du préfet, Petit Broglie

General information
- Type: Civic
- Architectural style: Baroque
- Location: Strasbourg, France
- Coordinates: 48°35′08″N 7°45′13″E
- Current tenants: Préfecture of Bas-Rhin
- Construction started: 1732
- Completed: 1736

Design and construction
- Architects: Jean-Pierre Pflug; Joseph Massol; Jean Geoffroy Conrath

The Hôtel de Klinglin, currently known as the Hôtel du Préfet, is a historic building located near the Place Broglie on the Grande Île in the city center of Strasbourg, in the French department of the Bas-Rhin. It has been classified as a monument historique since 1970.

The Hôtel de Klinglin currently serves as the residence of the prefect of the department of Bas-Rhin. It should not be confused with the Préfecture administrative on the Place de la République, which houses the administrative functions of the prefect.

== History ==
This grand hôtel particulier, of a different design than most in Strasbourg (featuring a straight and a crescent-shaped façade instead of two straight ones), was built between 1732 and 1736 for the royal moneylender (prêteur royal) François-Joseph de Klinglin (1686–1753). The architects were Jean-Pierre Pflug and Joseph Massol.

After Klinglin's disgrace and imprisonment in 1752, the hôtel became the seat of the royal Intendancy of Alsace, which it remained until the French Revolution. Between 1789 and 1799, it was used as the seat of the Directoire du district and since 1800, it has served as the residency of the prefect of Bas-Rhin, with two intervals: between 1871 and 1918, it housed the Statthalter (governor) of Alsace-Lorraine and between 1940 and 1944, the Gauleiter.

During the Siege of Strasbourg in 1870, the hôtel was heavily damaged by Prussian artillery: the exterior walls withstood but the roof collapsed and almost all the interiors were destroyed. It was rapidly rebuilt and refurnished using as much original material as possible; only the shape of the roof was modified and a balcony added. The architect responsible for the reconstruction was Jean Geoffroy Conrath, who also faithfully rebuilt the opera house nearby.

The Hôtel du préfet is not open for tourists apart on special days such as European Heritage Days.

== Gallery ==
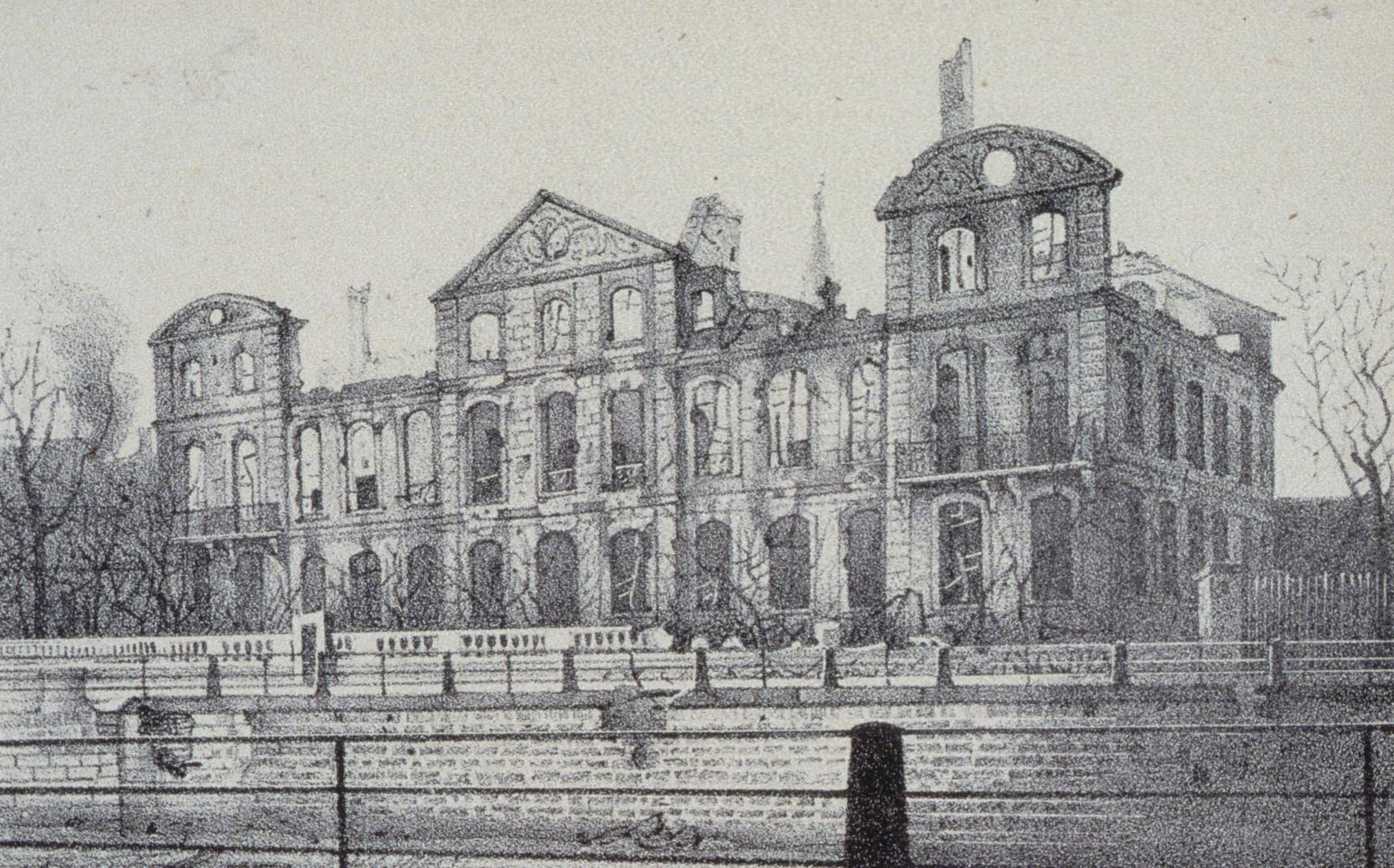
The hôtel seen in 1870, after the shelling by Prussian troops

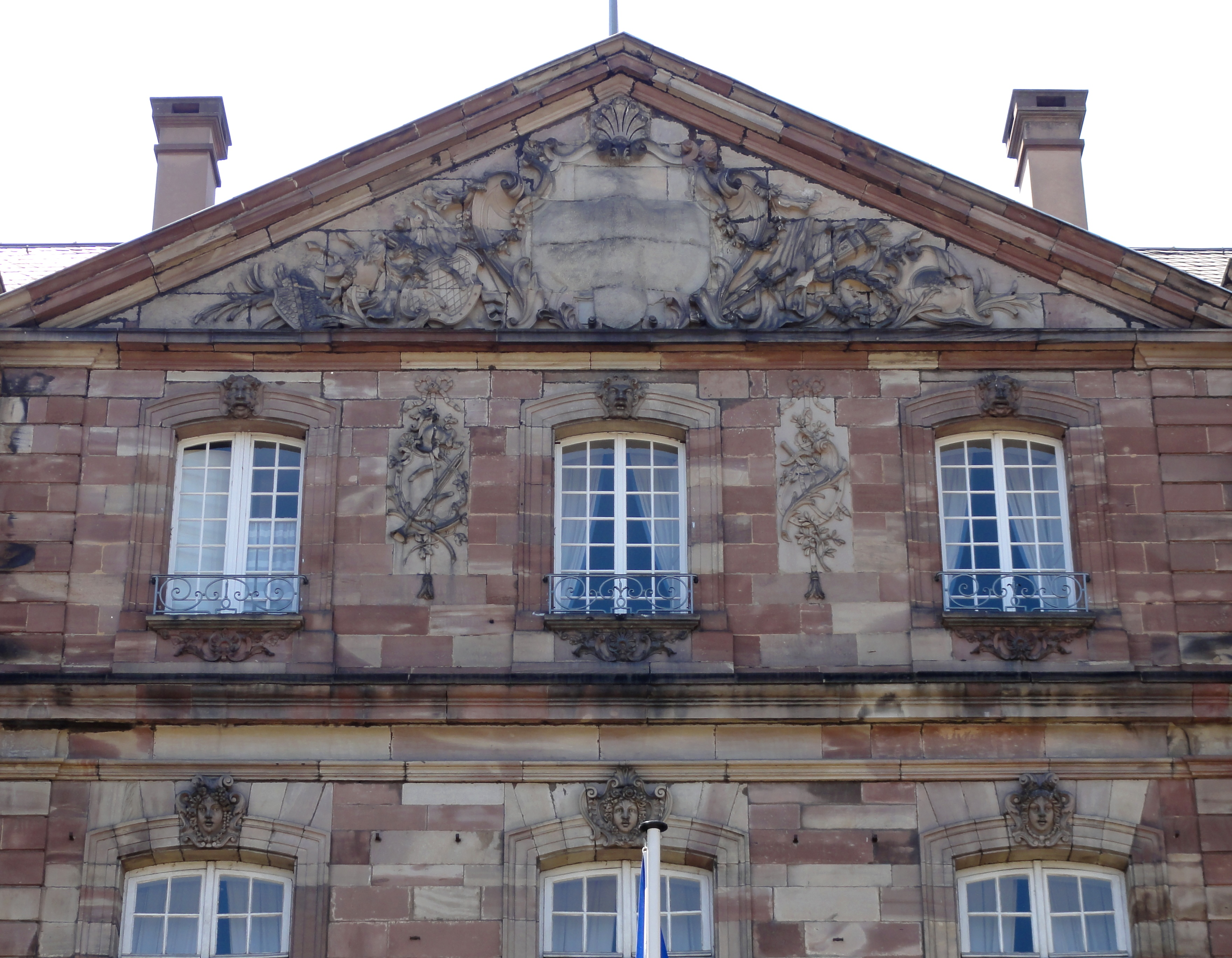
Pediment of the riverside façade

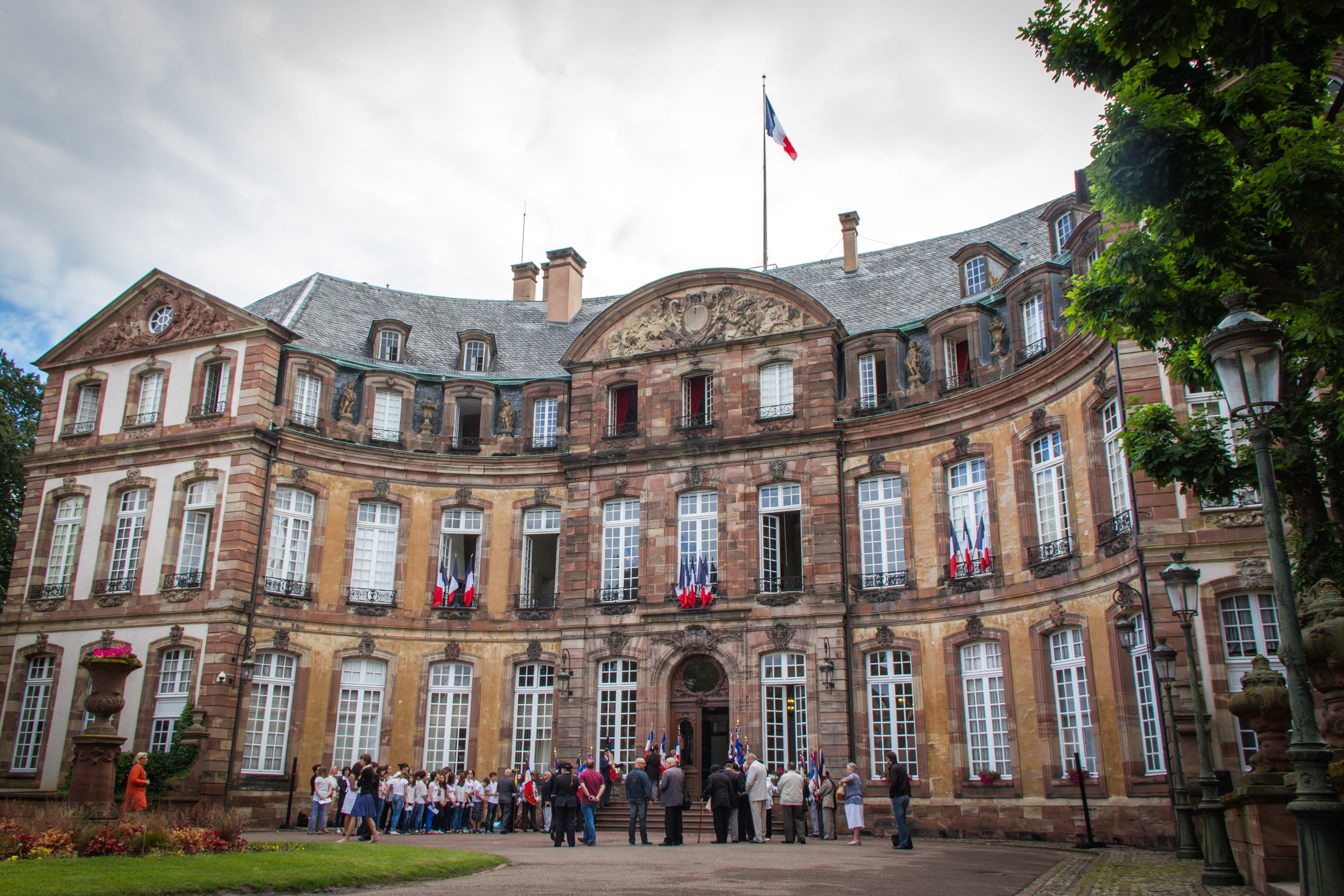
Courtyard

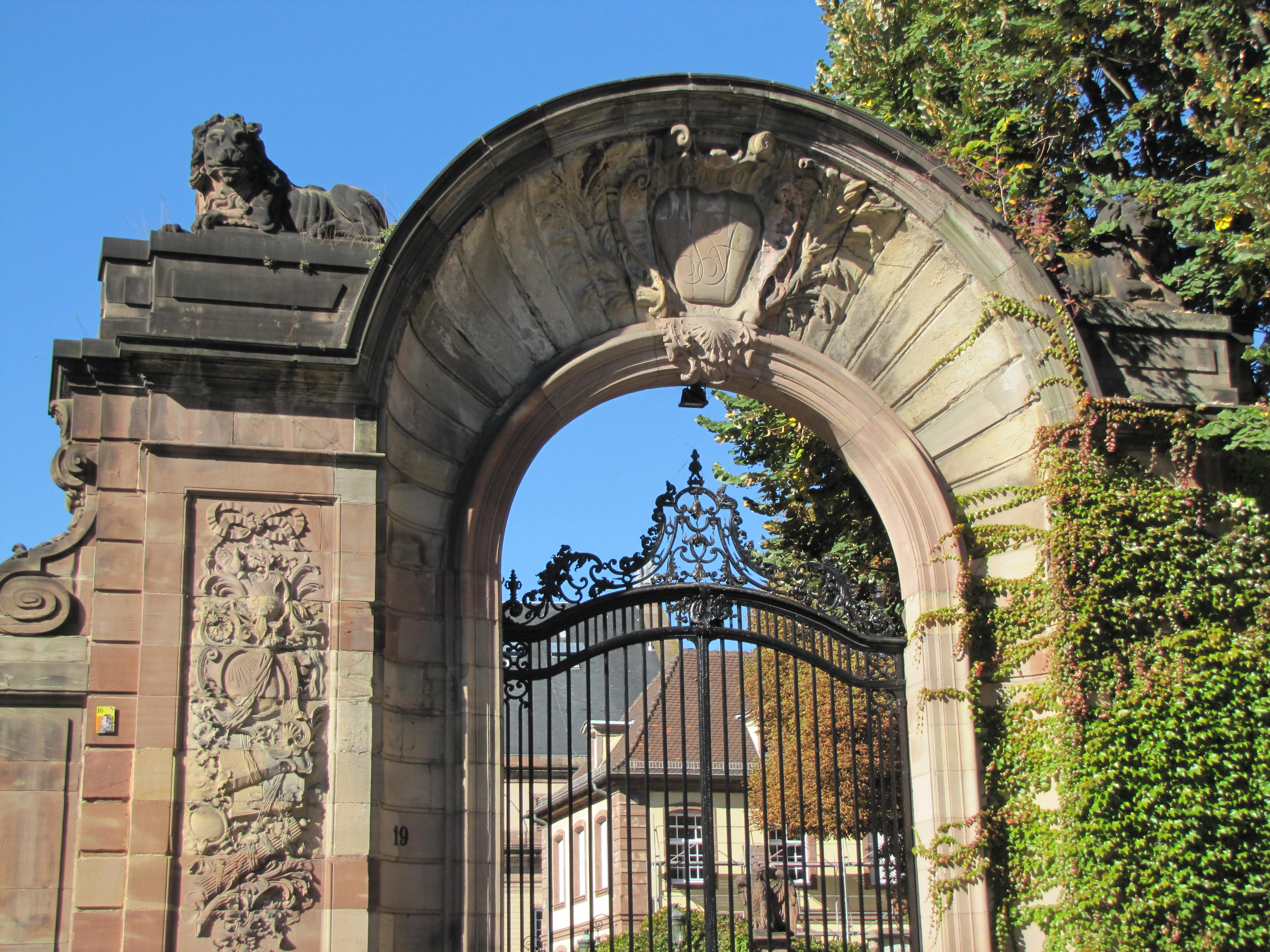
Main portal on the Rue brûlée (detail), added in 1747 by Joseph Massol

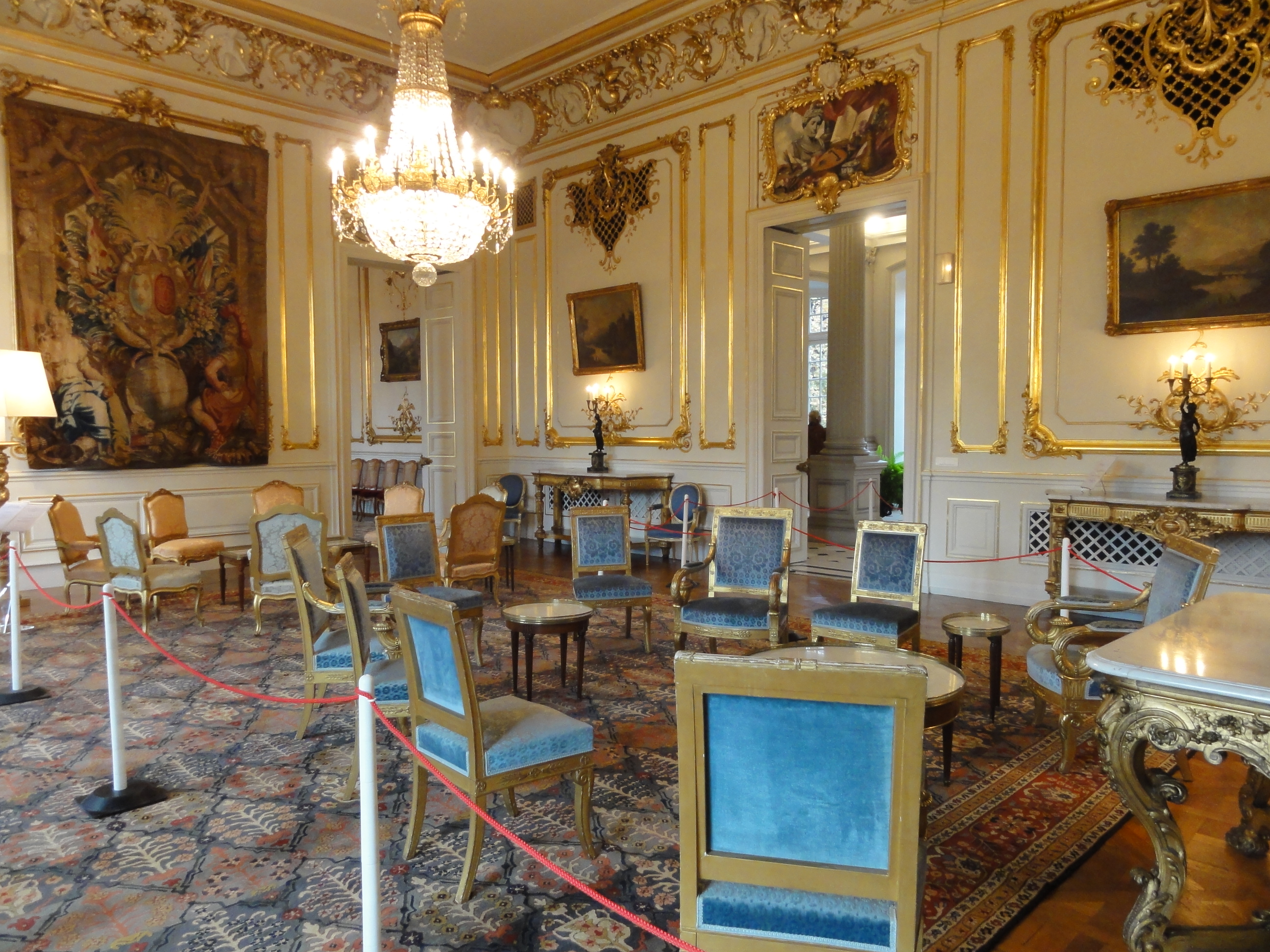
A reception room

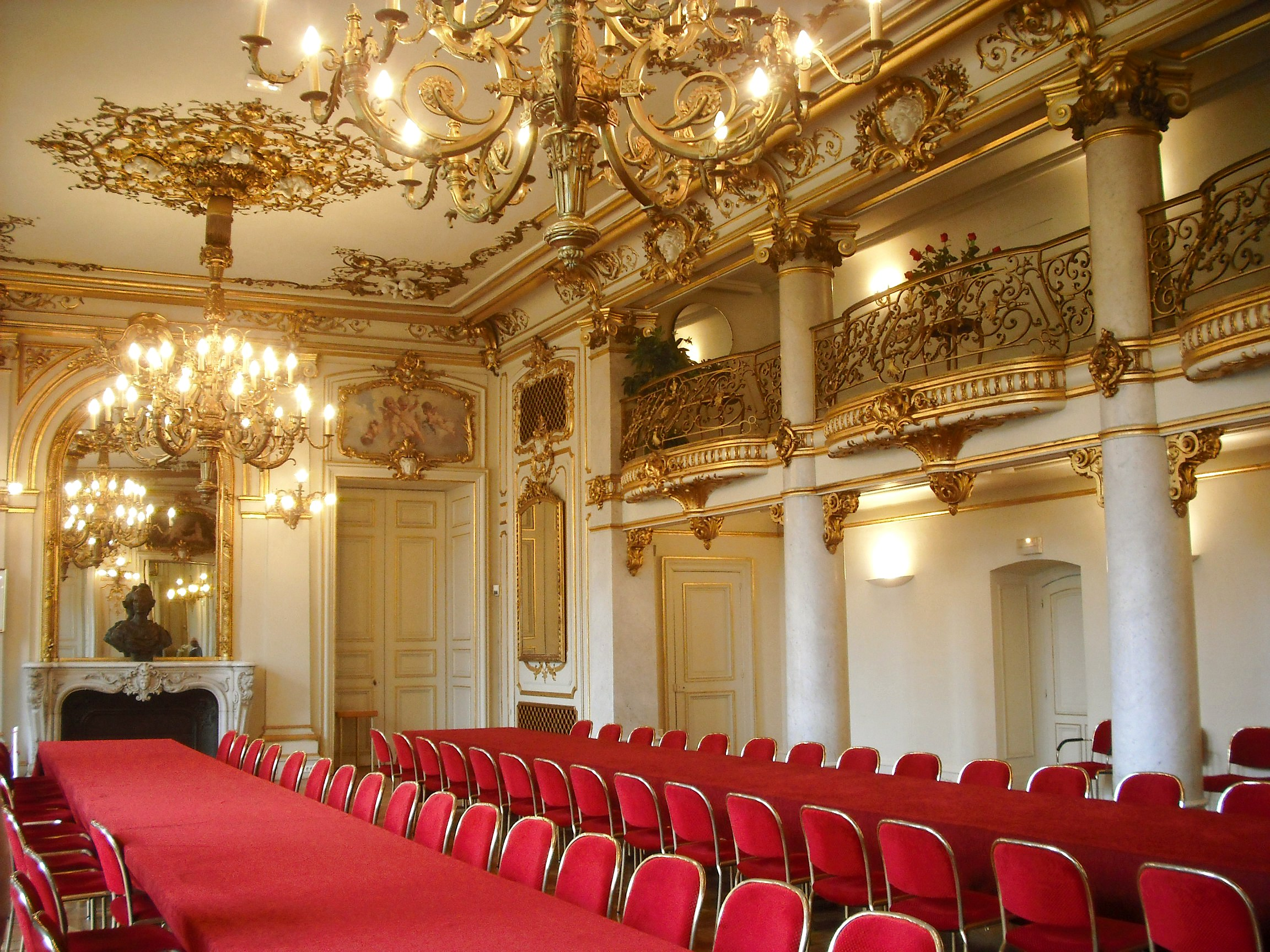
Former ball room, now salle Louise Weiss

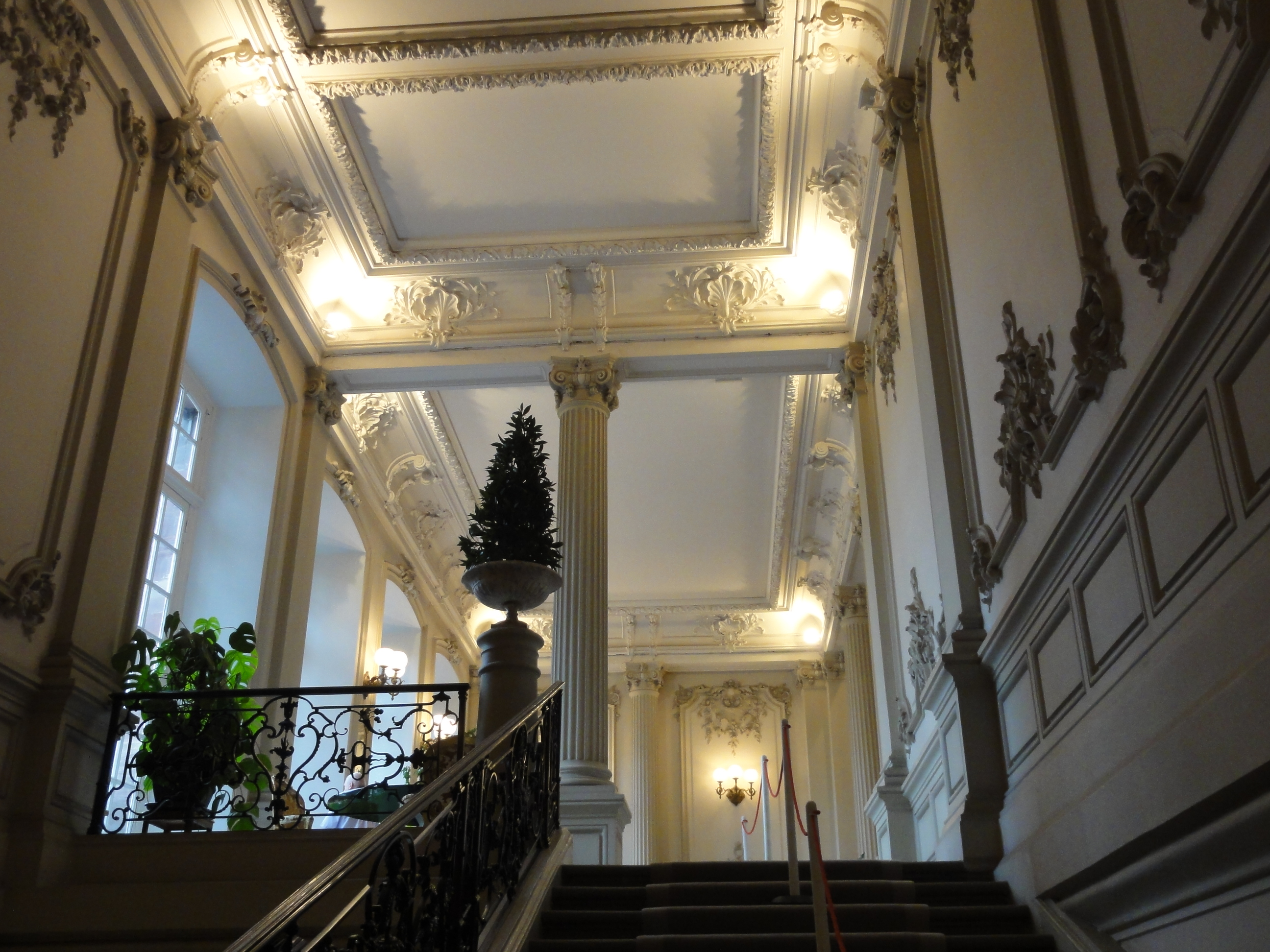
Upper floor of the grand staircase

== Literature ==
- Recht, Roland; Foessel, Georges; Klein, Jean-Pierre: Connaître Strasbourg, 1988, ISBN 2-7032-0185-0, pages 121–124

== See also ==
- Palais Rohan
- Hôtel de Hanau
- Hôtel des Deux-Ponts
- Hôtel du grand doyenné
