= Strasbourg Opera House =

- Opéra de Strasbourg
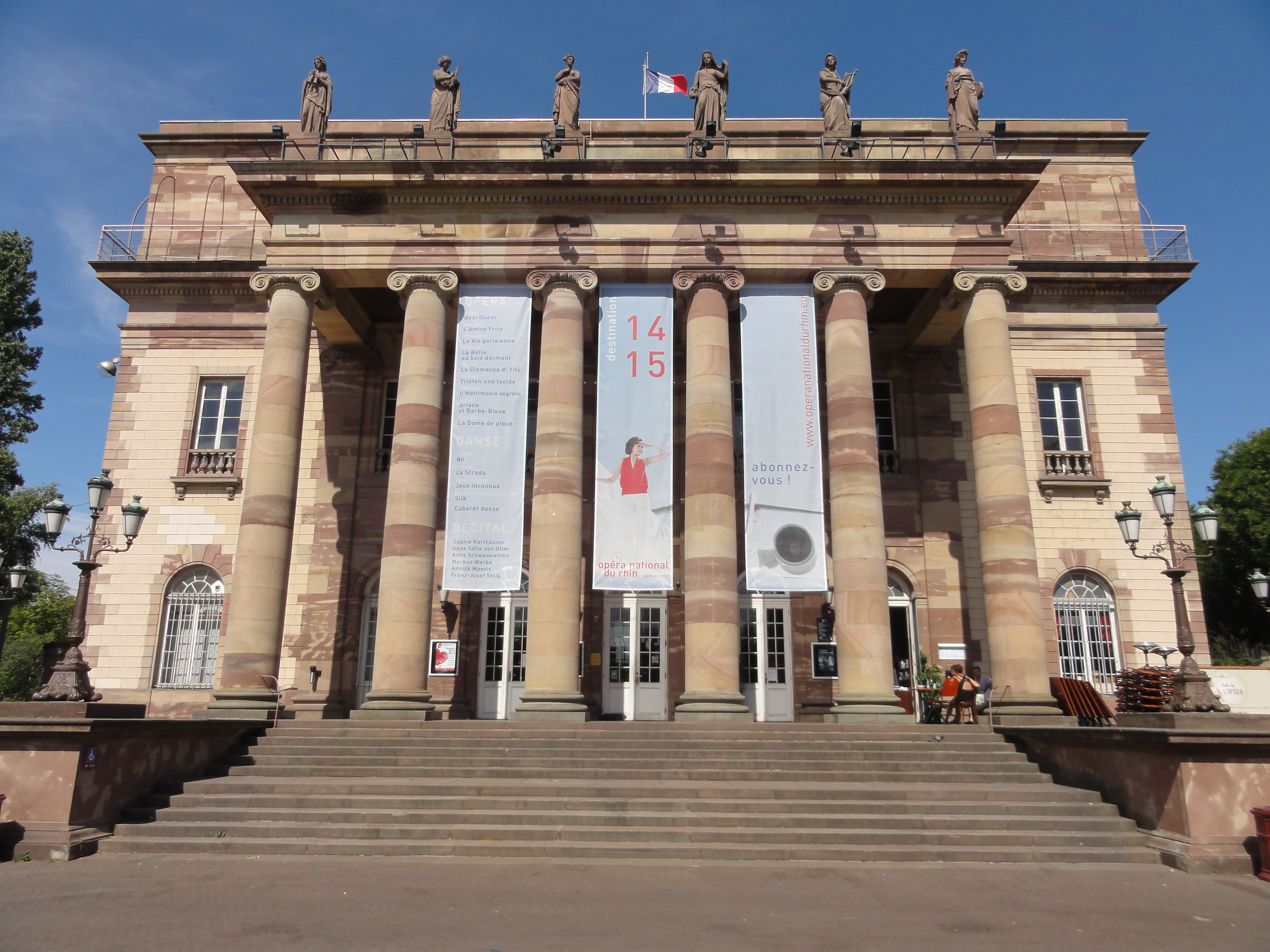
- Façade in June 2014

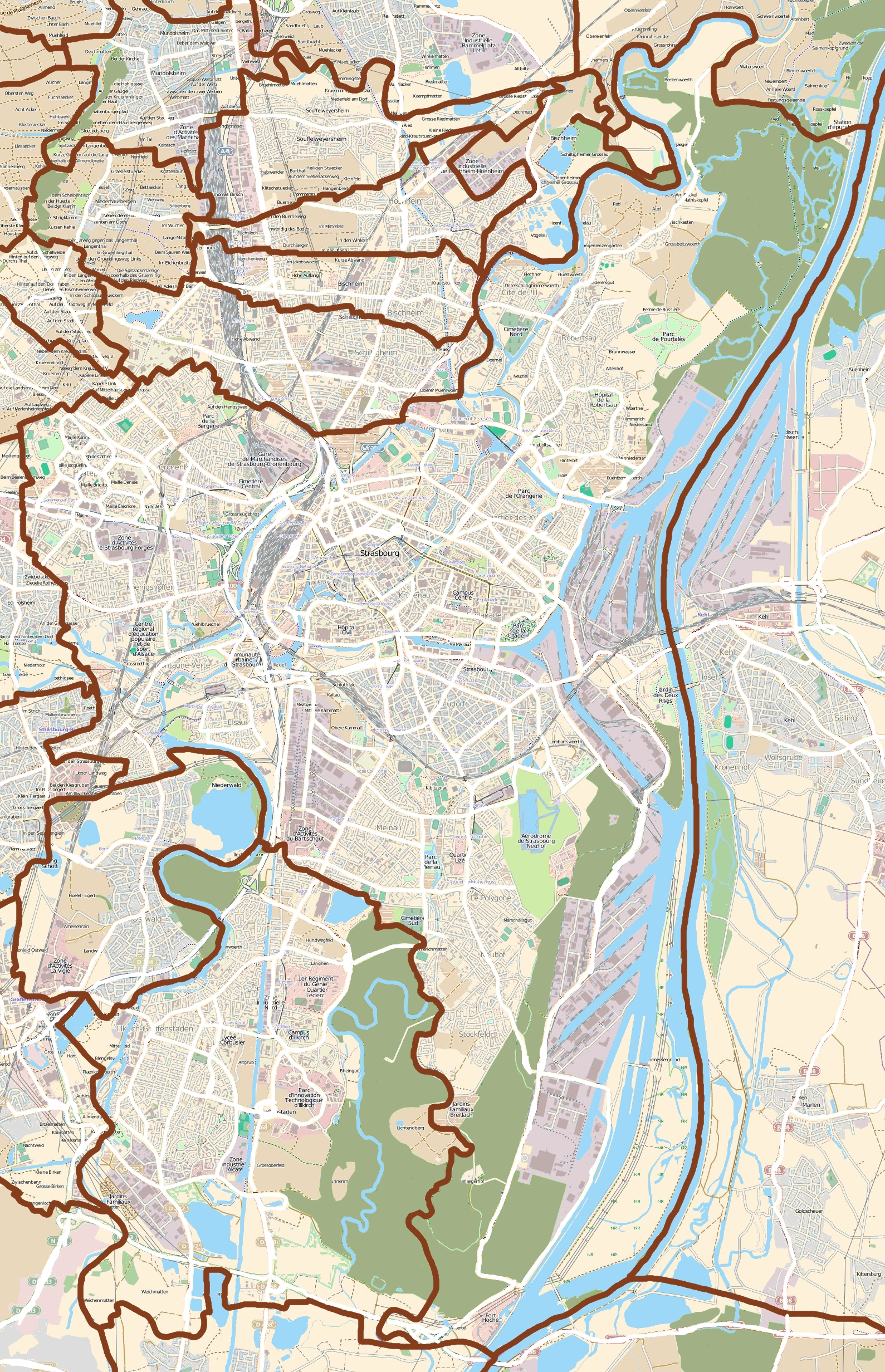
- Location within Strasbourg
- Former names: German: Strassburger Stadttheater (1871–1918)
- Alternative names: Théâtre municipal (before 1871)

General information
- Type: Opera house
- Architectural style: French Neoclassicism
- Location: Strasbourg, France
- Coordinates: 48°35′09.31″N 7°45′08.54″E
- Completed: 1821; 1888

Design and construction
- Architects: Jean-Nicolas Villot, Jean Geoffroy Conrath, Johann-Karl Ott

The Strasbourg Opera House (French: Opéra de Strasbourg), located on the Place Broglie on the Grande Île in the city center of Strasbourg, in the French department of the Bas-Rhin, is the main seat and mother house of the opera company Opéra national du Rhin. It has been classified as a monument historique since 1921.

== History ==
After a fire in 1800 that destroyed a previous opera house, also located on the Place Broglie, the Strasbourg municipality set up plans for a new one in 1804. As the Napoleonic Empire came and went, the plans for the théâtre municipal were altered several times, until the building, designed in the Neoclassical style by architect Jean-Nicolas Villot (1782–1857) finally opened to great acclaim in 1821. The monumental façade is adorned by sandstone statues of six muses by Landolin Ohmacht (three muses were left out: Clio, Thalia and Urania), each statue corresponding to a column below.

During the Siege of Strasbourg in 1870, the opera was heavily damaged by Prussian artillery. It was faithfully rebuilt by the architect Jean Geoffroy Conrath, who also rebuilt the Hôtel de Klinglin nearby, and reopened in 1873. In 1888, a semi-circular wing was added at the rear by Johann-Karl Ott (1846–1917).

The auditorium has 1,142 seats and a height of 18 metres (59 feet) from the floor to the ceiling. It has seen performances being conducted by Hans Pfitzner, Wilhelm Furtwängler, Otto Klemperer and George Szell.

== Gallery ==
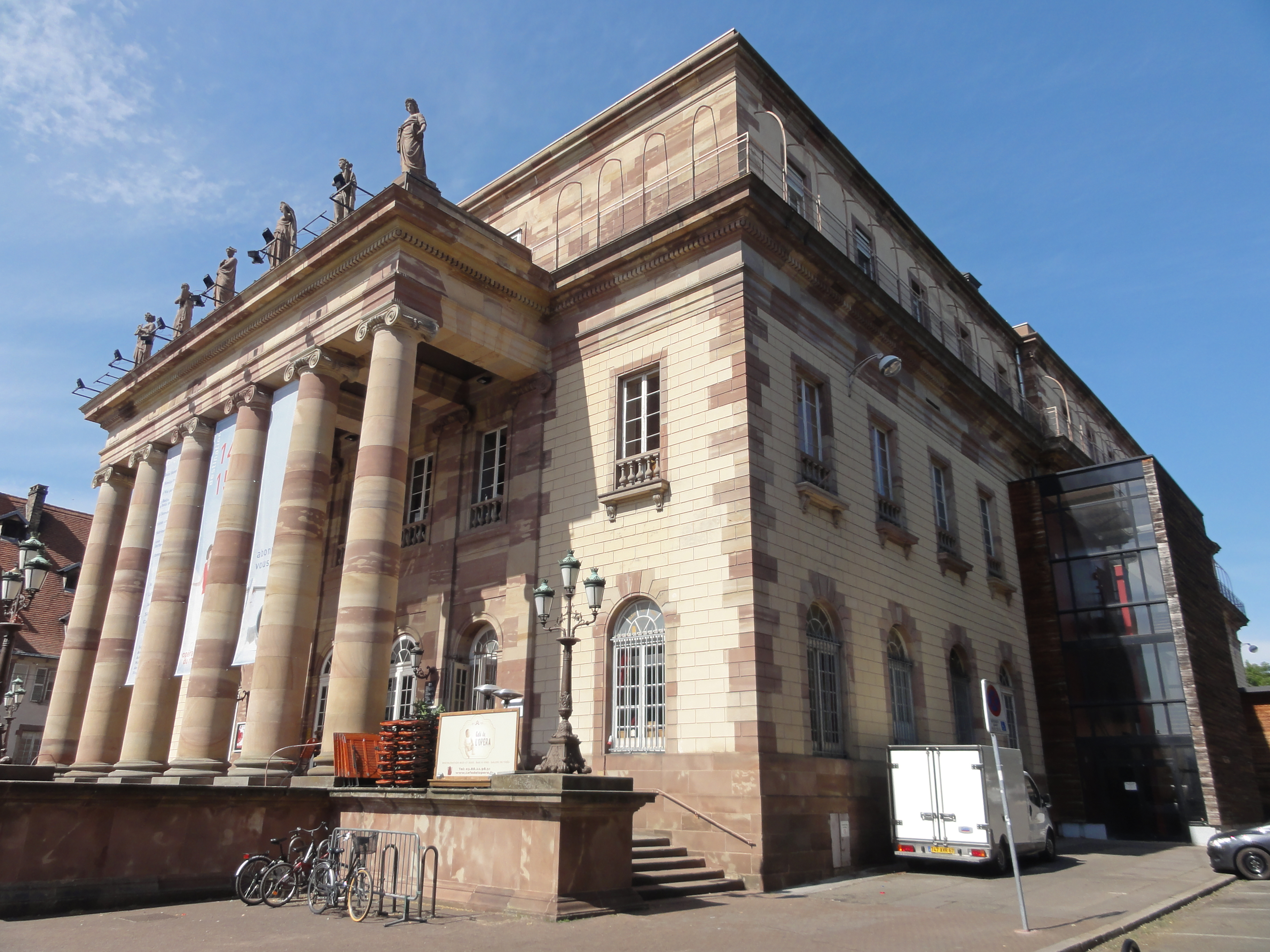
Façade and southern side

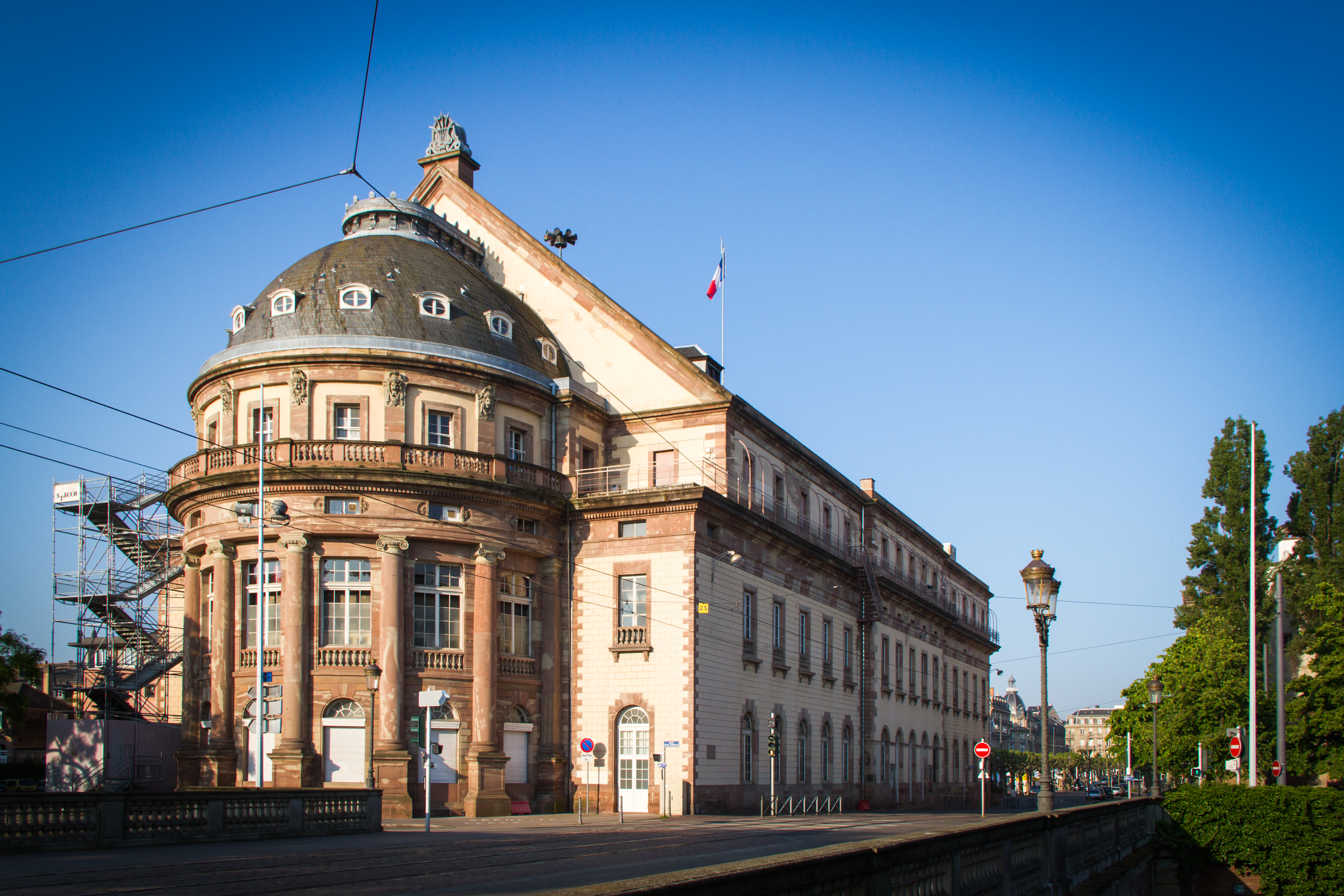
Rear and northern side seen from the Pont du théâtre

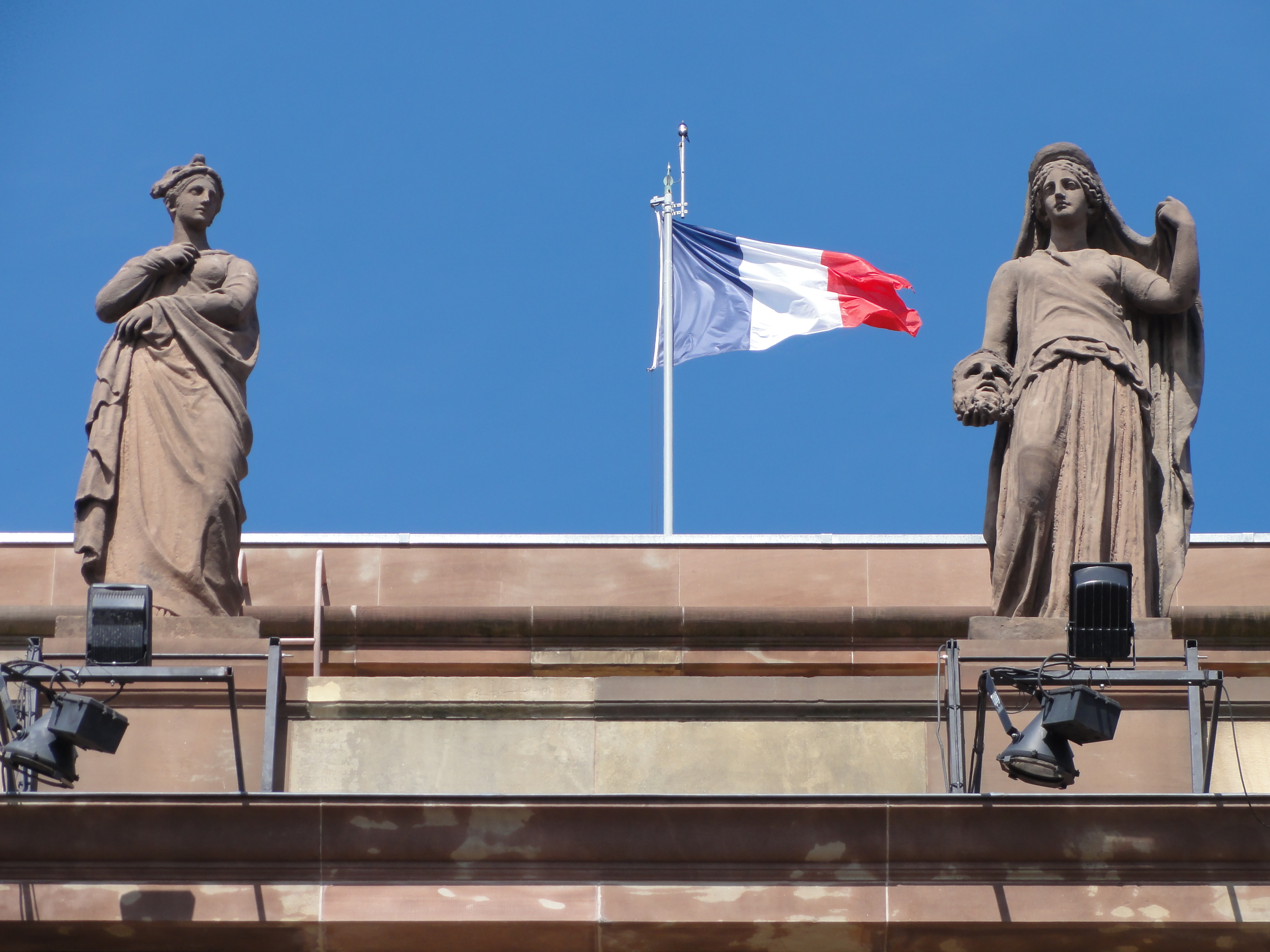
Polyhymnia and Melpomene on top of the façade

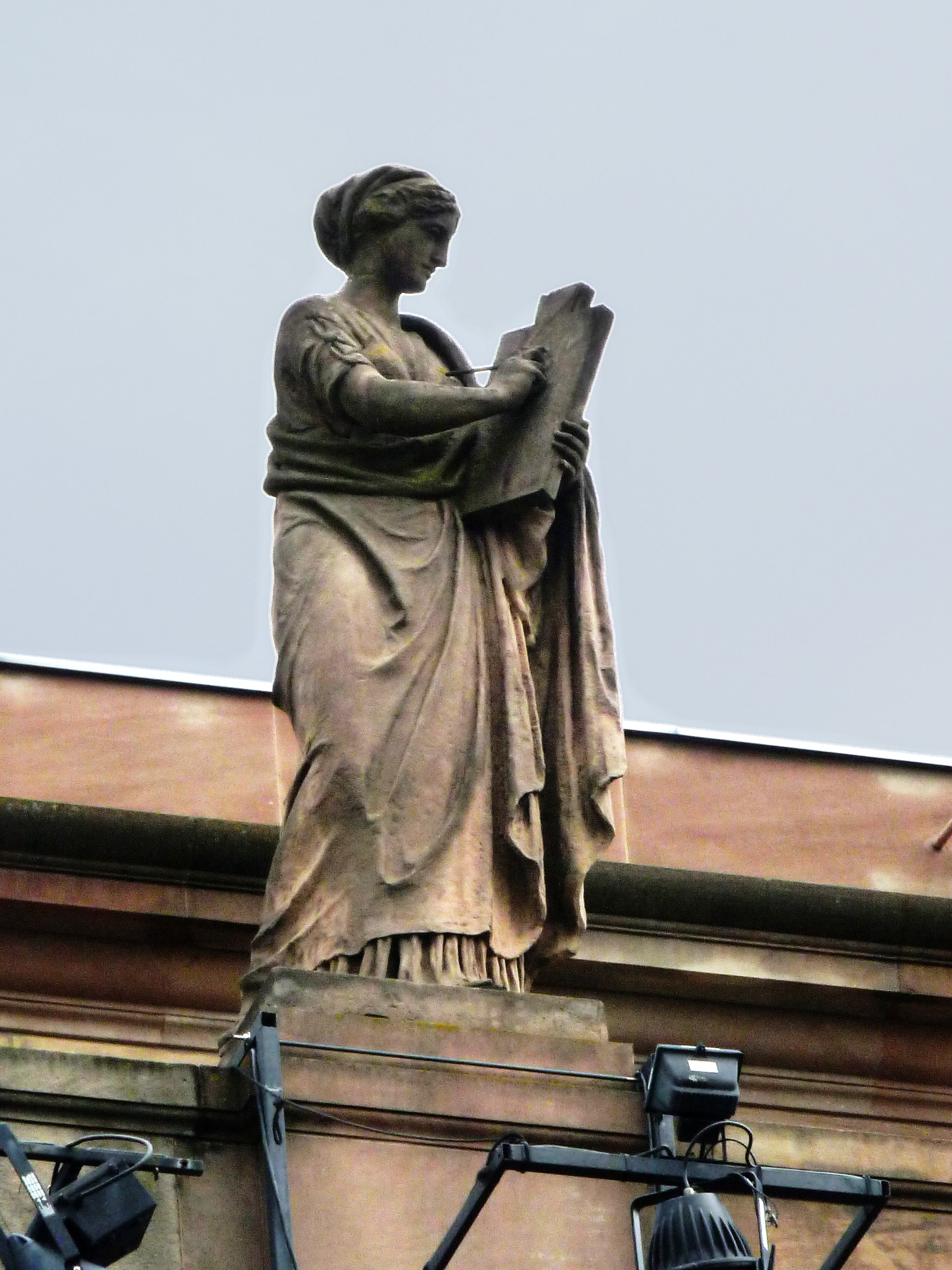
Calliope on top of the façade

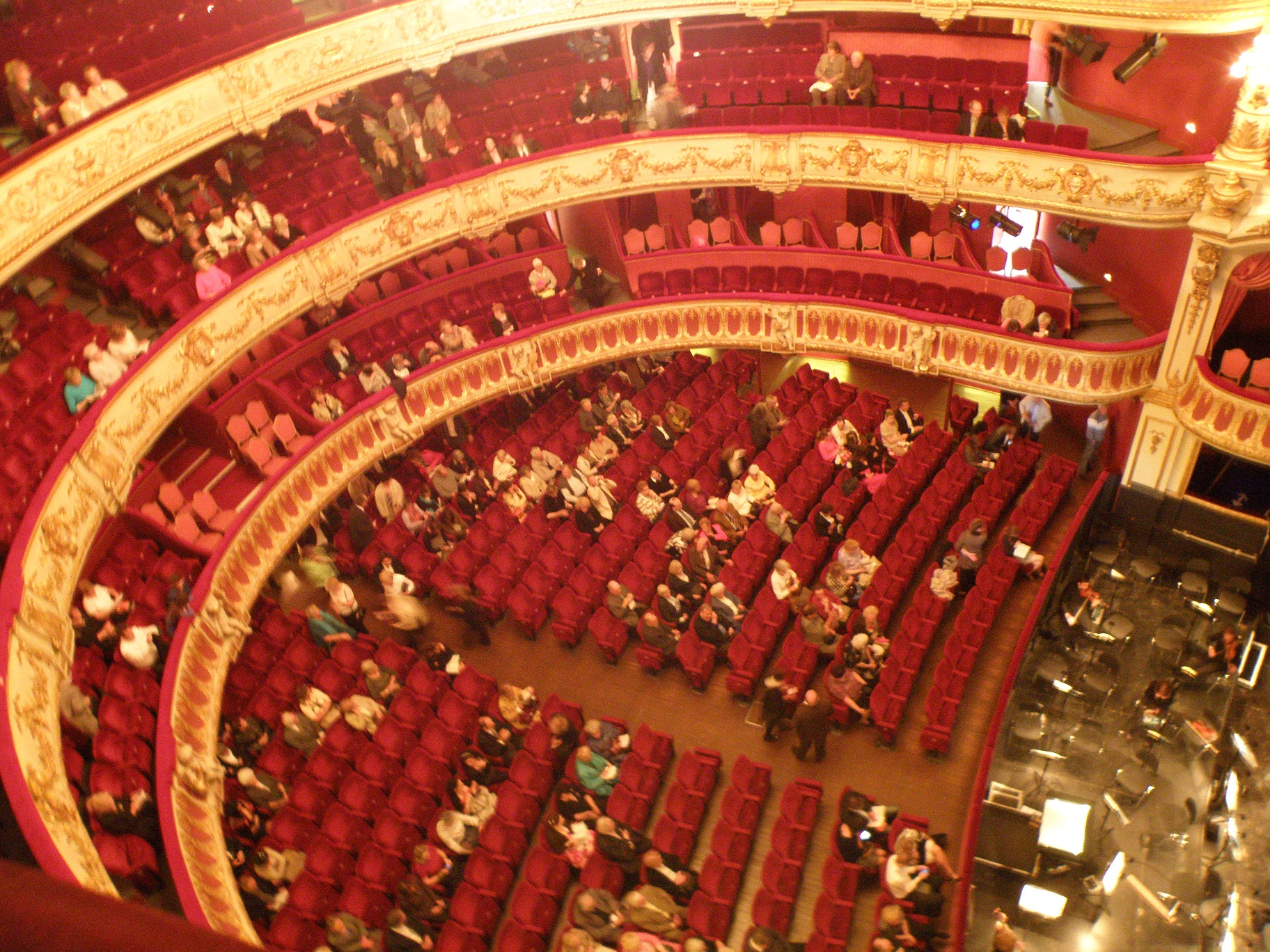
Seats

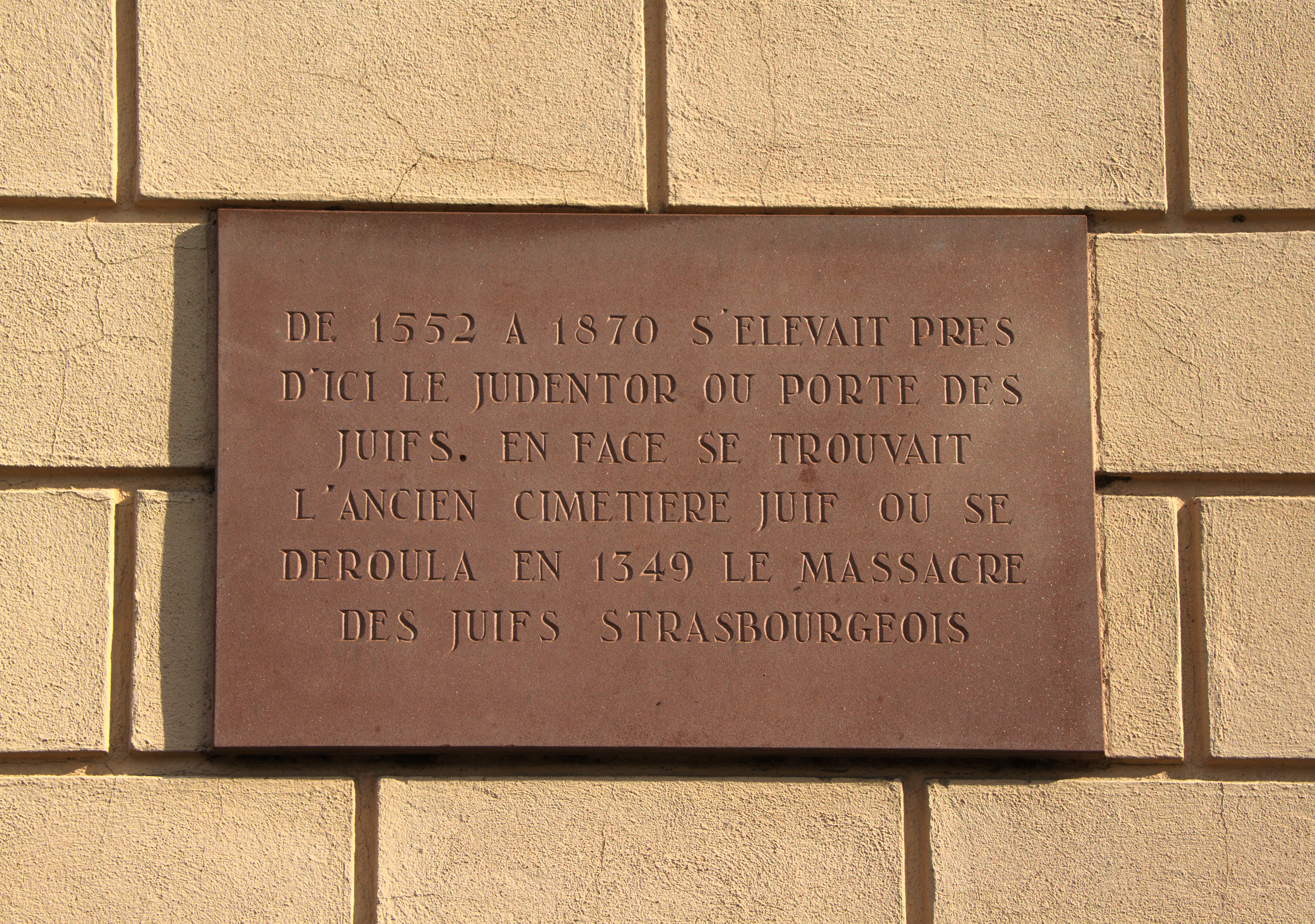
Plaque on the northern side commemorating the Strasbourg massacre of Jews in 1349

== See also ==
- Palais des Fêtes

== Literature ==
- Recht, Roland; Foessel, Georges; Klein, Jean-Pierre: Connaître Strasbourg, 1988, ISBN 2-7032-0185-0, page 228
