= Hôtel des Deux-Ponts =

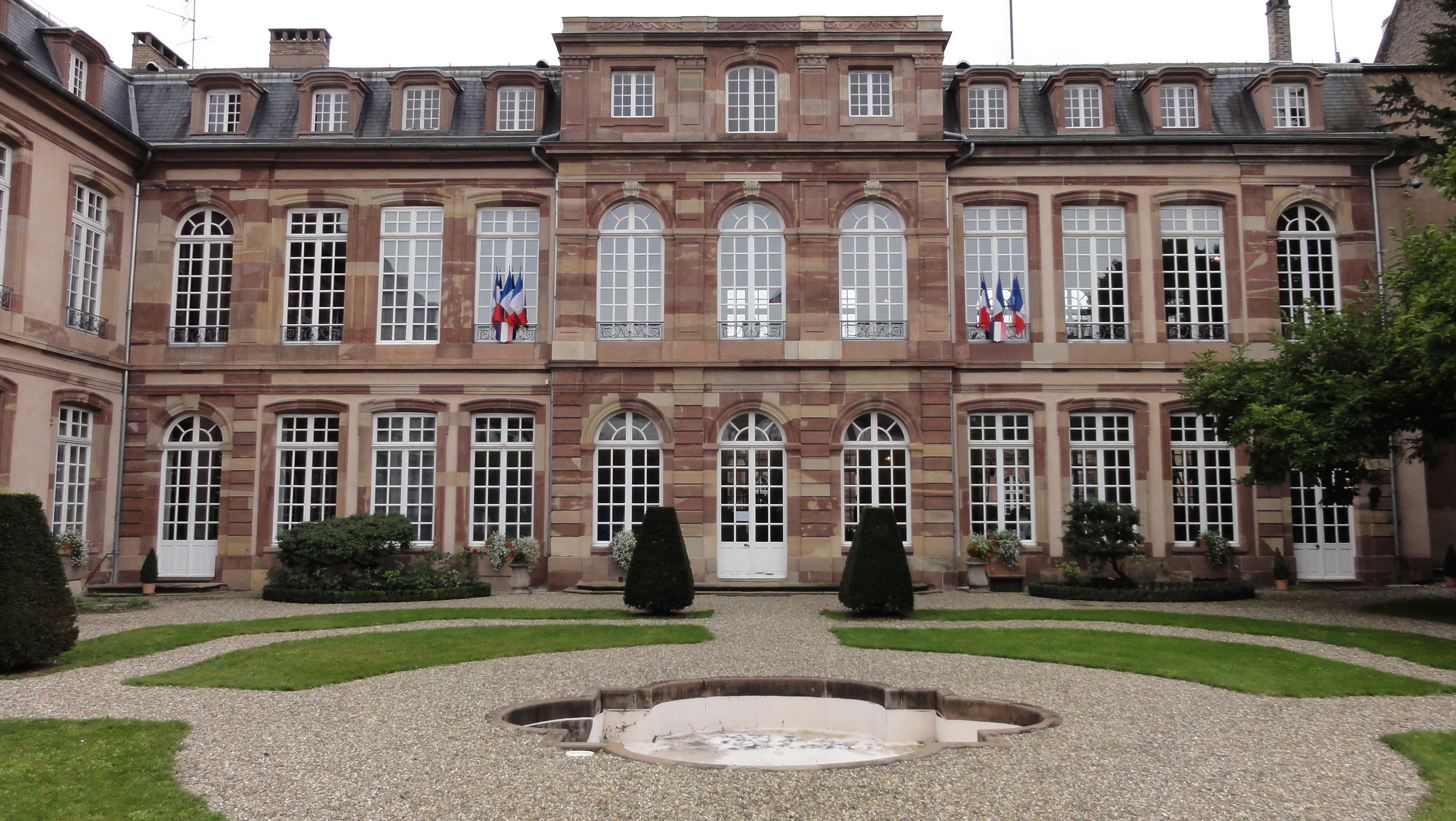
- Façade and garden on the Place Broglie

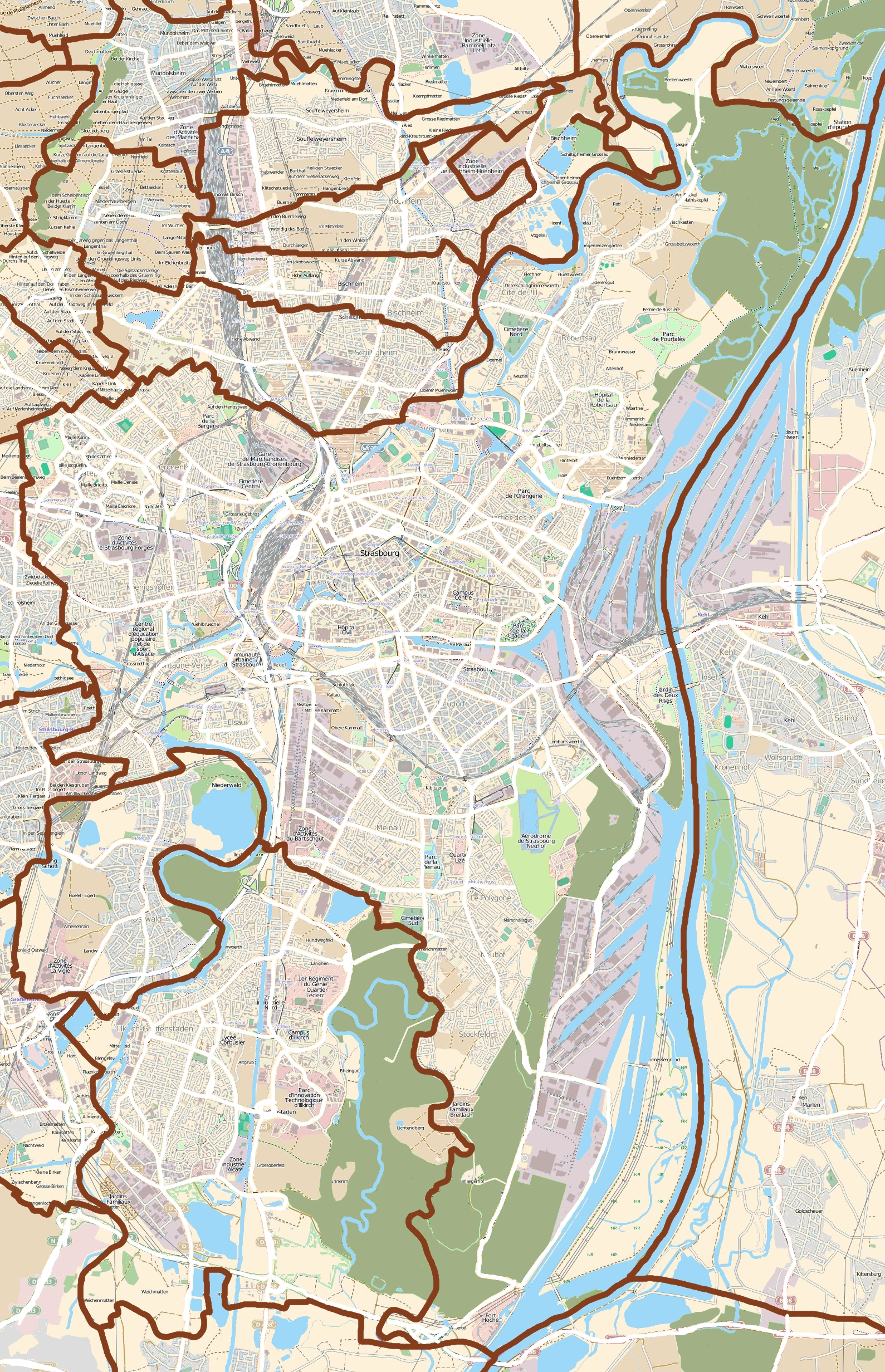
- Location within Strasbourg
- Former names: Hôtel de Gayot
- Alternative names: Hôtel du gouverneur militaire

General information
- Type: Civic
- Architectural style: Baroque
- Location: Strasbourg, France
- Coordinates: 48°35′06″N 7°45′06″E
- Current tenants: French Armed Forces
- Construction started: 1754
- Completed: 1755

Design and construction
- Architects: Joseph Massol, Georges Michel Muller

The Hôtel des Deux-Ponts, formerly known as the Hôtel Gayot and currently as the Hôtel du gouverneur militaire, is a historic building located on the Place Broglie on the Grande Île in the city center of Strasbourg, in the French department of the Bas-Rhin. It has been classified as a monument historique since 1921.

The Hôtel des Deux-Ponts is currently used as the official residence of the military governor of Strasbourg.

== History ==
The Hôtel was designed as a hôtel particulier for the brothers, royal moneylenders François-Marie Gayot and Félix-Anne Gayot and built in 1754–55 featuring a courtyard, two ornate façades, a grand portal and a French garden. In 1770, it was sold by François-Marie Gayot to count palatine Christian IV of Zweibrücken, hence its name (German: zwei Brücken = English: two bridges = French: deux ponts). Maximilian Joseph of Zweibrücken-Birkenfeld, the future King Maximilian I of Bavaria lived there from 1770 until 1790. His son and successor on the Bavarian throne, Ludwig I of Bavaria, was born in this palace on 25 August 1786.

The hôtel became state-owned (bien public) in the wake of the French Revolution in 1791 and has served as the official residence for military governors and chiefs of staff since, including during the periods when Strasbourg was a German town again (1871–1918 and 1940–1944). It is not open for tourists apart on special days such as European Heritage Days.

== Gallery ==
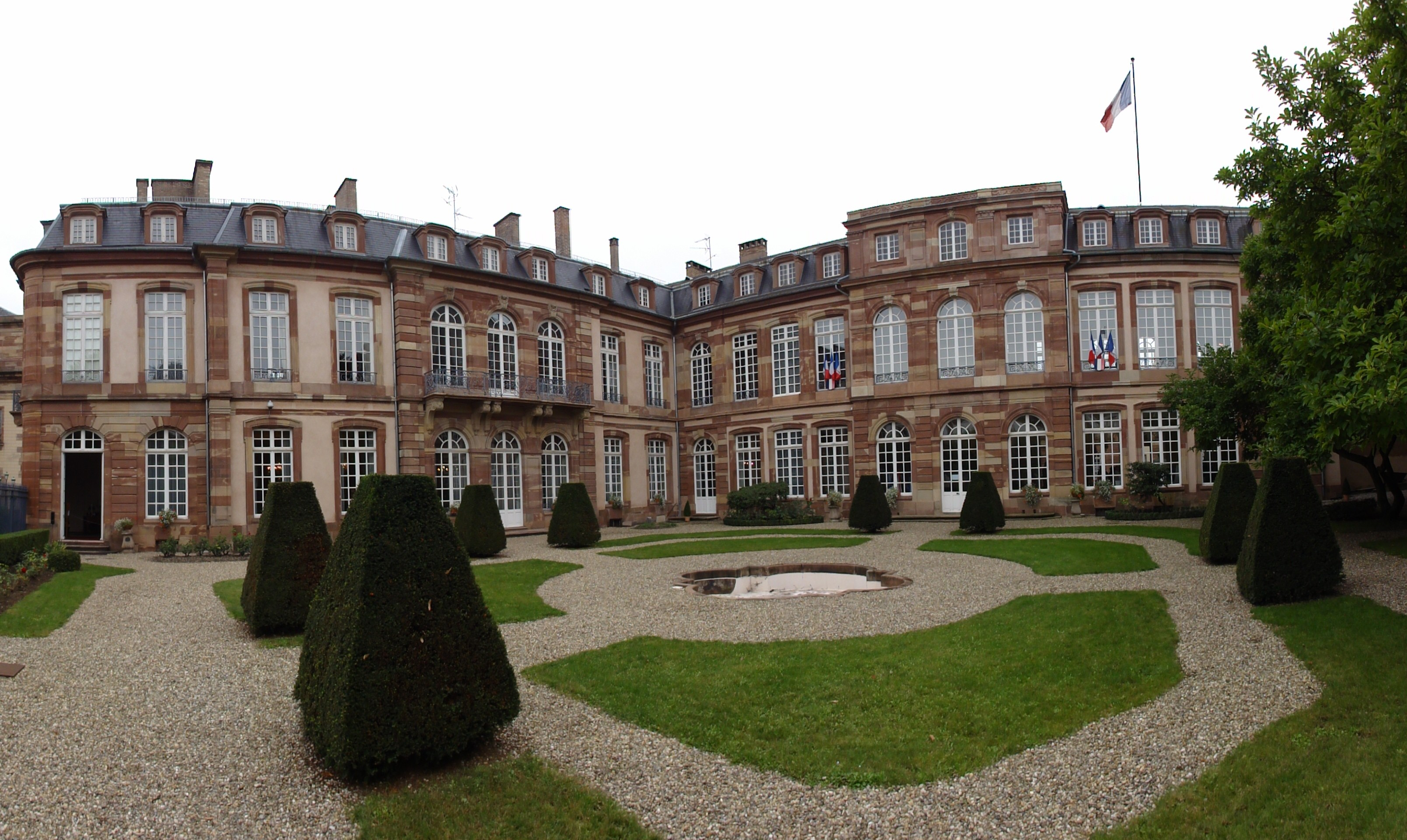
Panoramic view through the garden on the Place Broglie

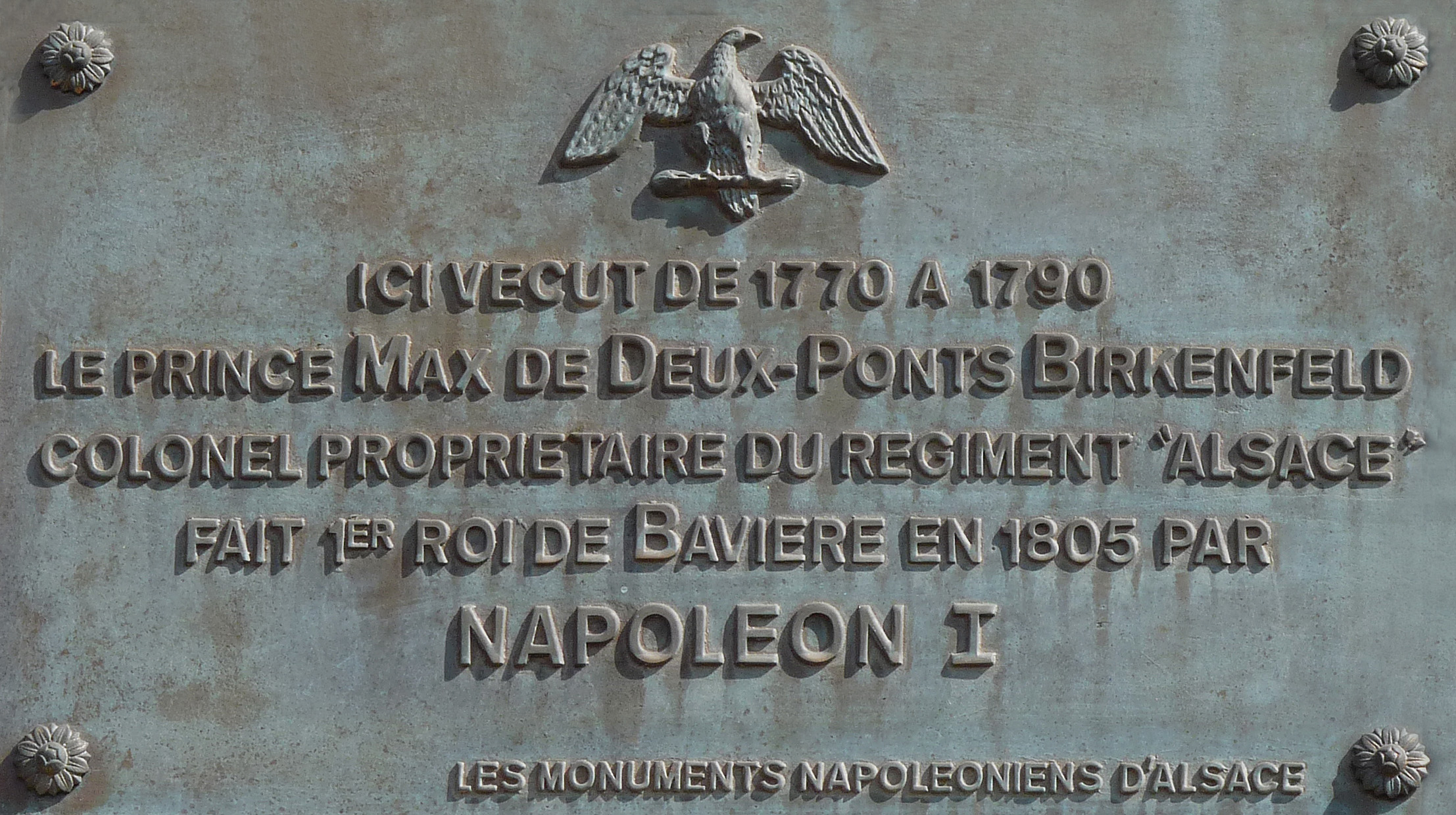
Plaque for Maximilian I Joseph of Bavaria

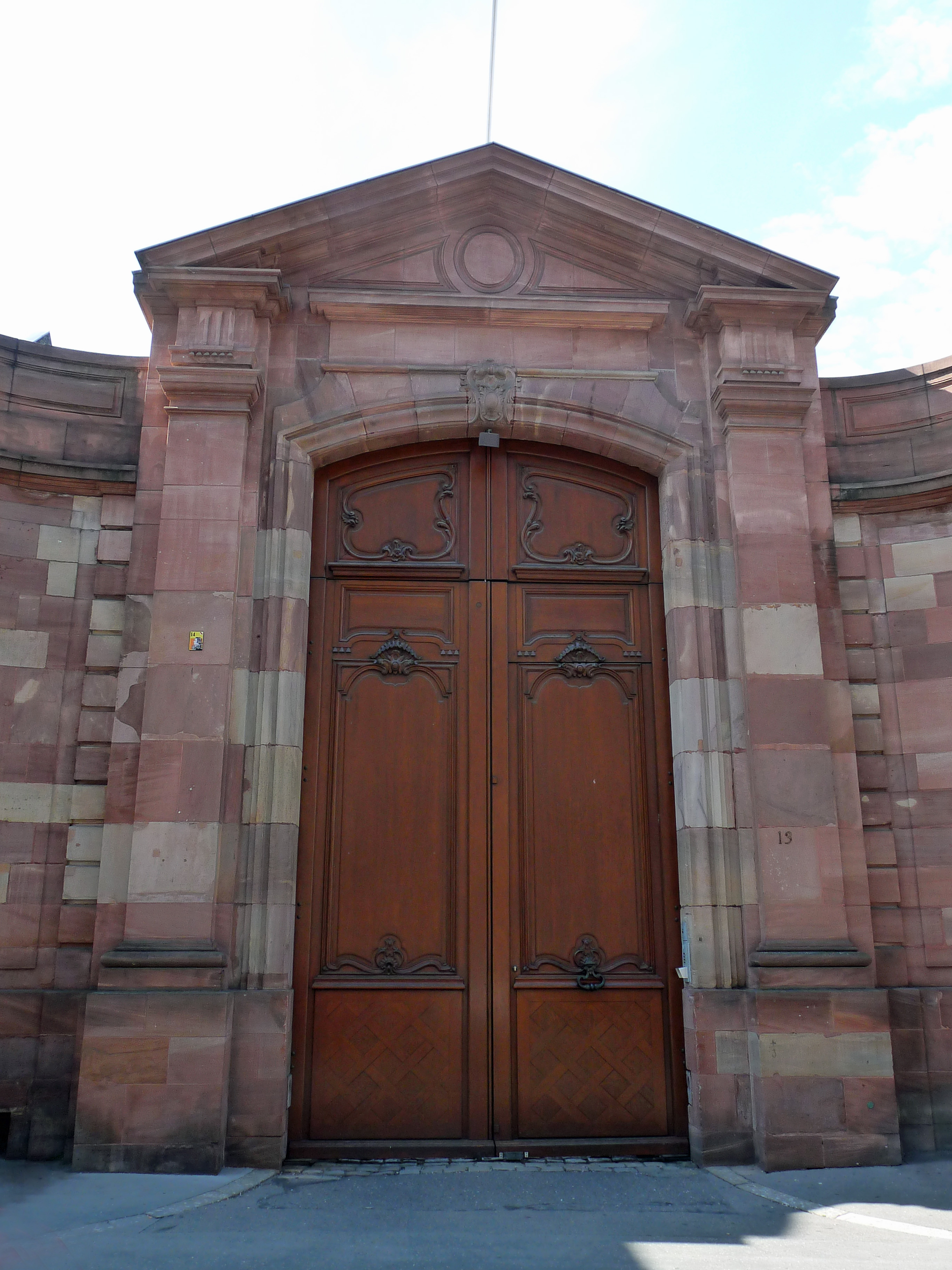
Main portal on the Rue brûlée. The courtyard right behind is rarely seen.

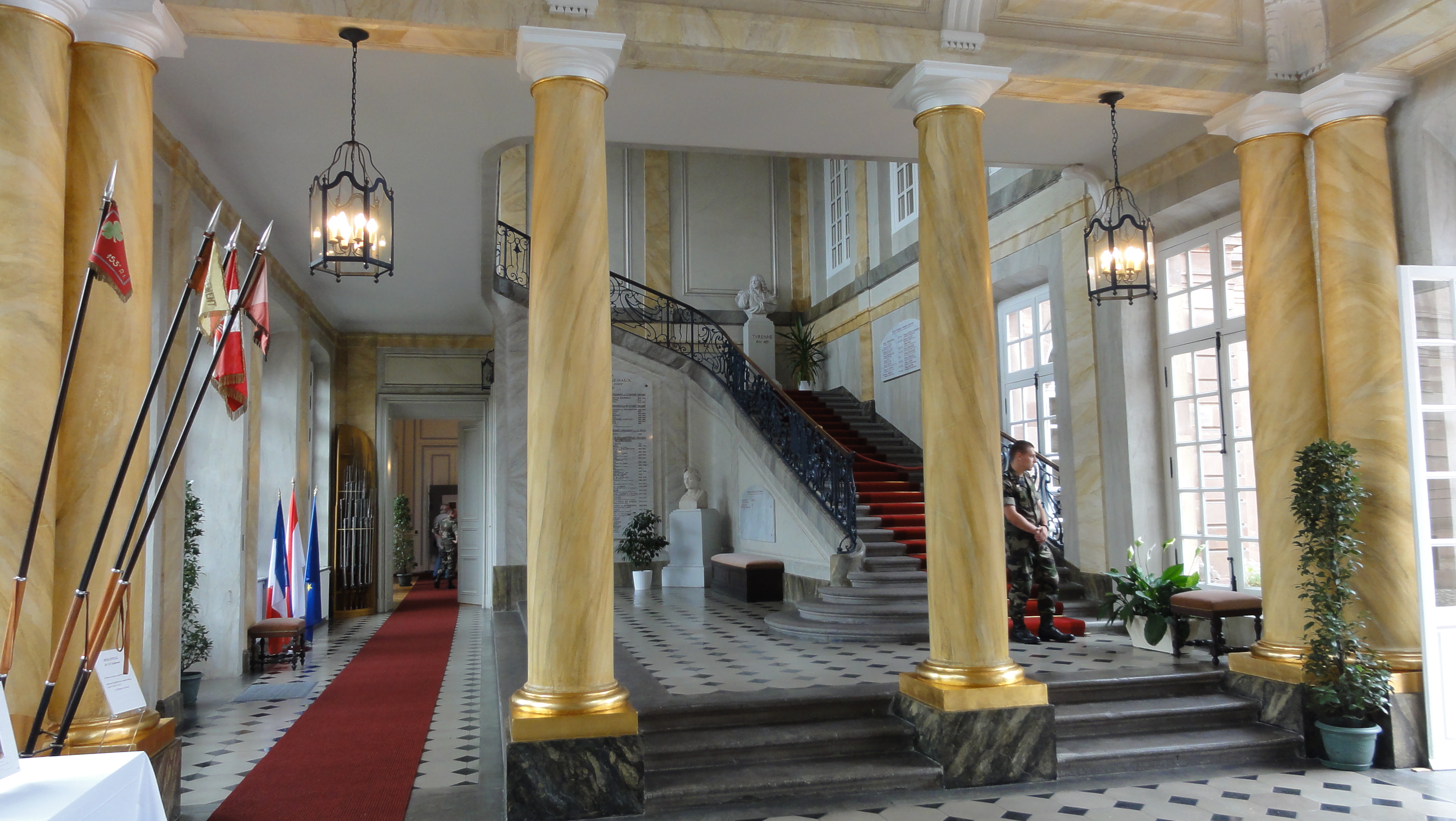
Lower part of the entrance hall

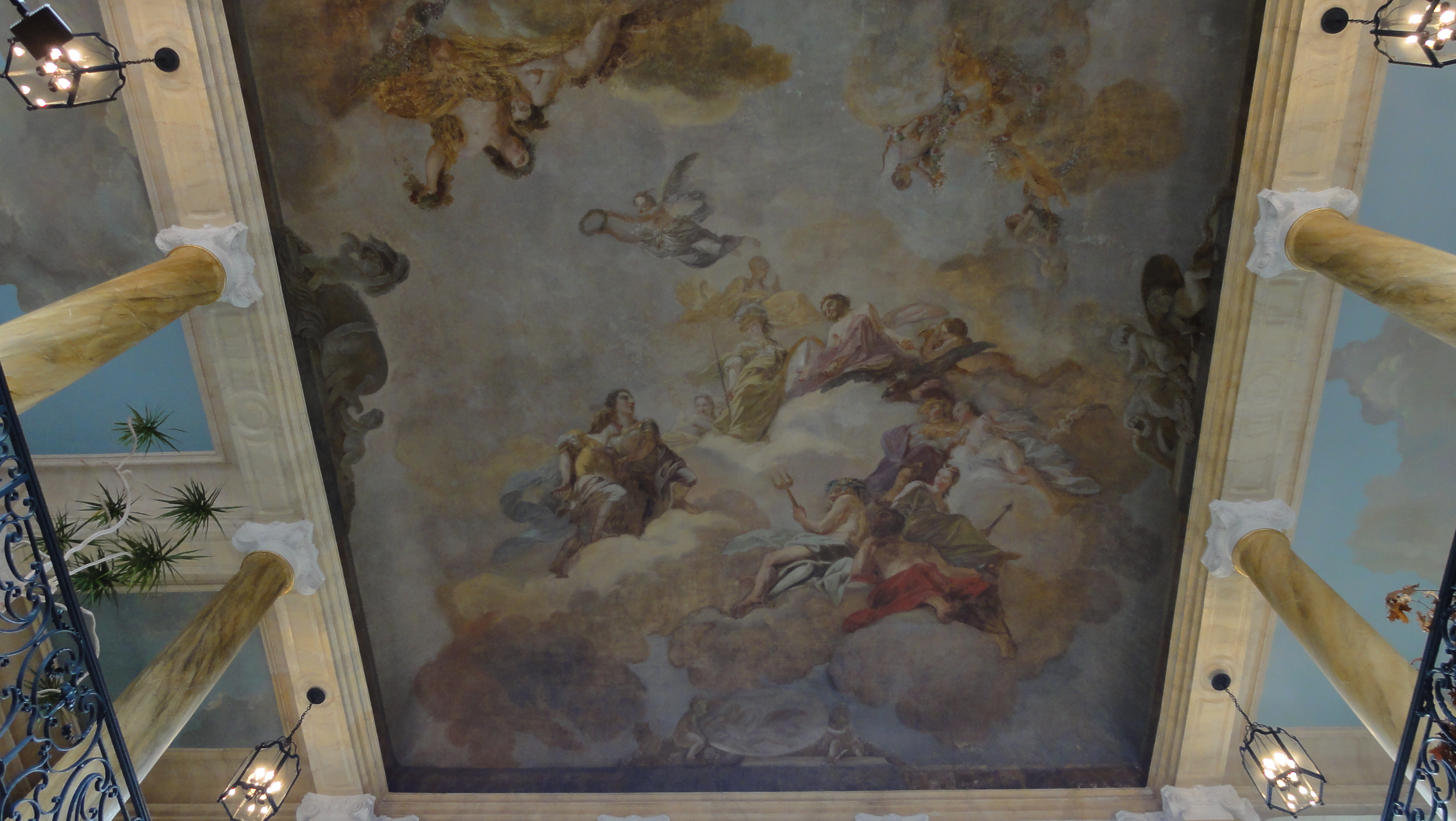
Ceiling of the entrance hall with a fresco by Joseph Melling (1785)

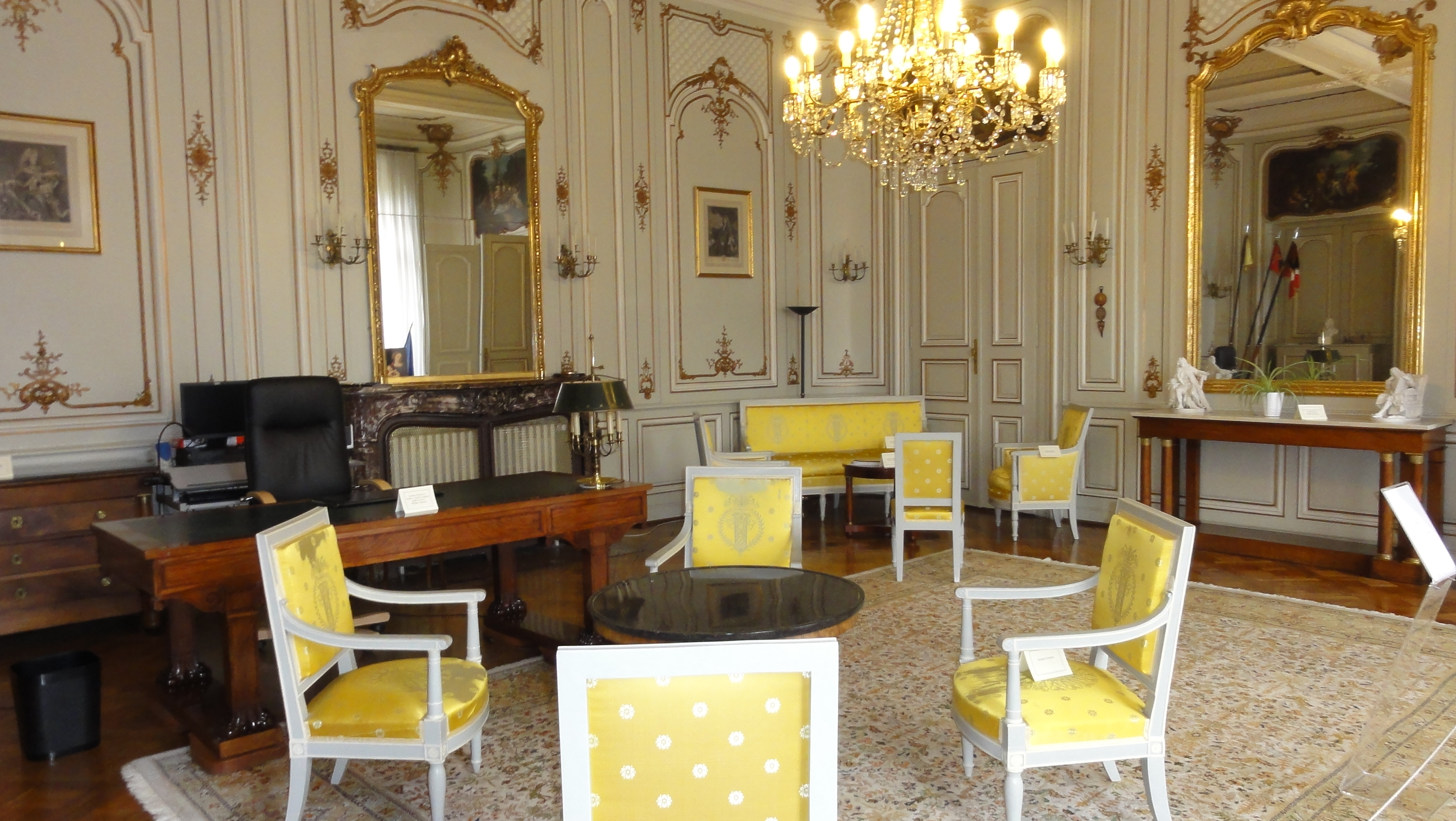
A working and reception room

== Literature ==
- Recht, Roland; Foessel, Georges; Klein, Jean-Pierre: Connaître Strasbourg, 1988, ISBN 2-7032-0185-0, pages 119–120

== See also ==
- Palais Rohan
- Hôtel de Hanau
- Hôtel de Klinglin
- Hôtel du grand doyenné
