= Place Broglie =

Major square in Strasbourg, France

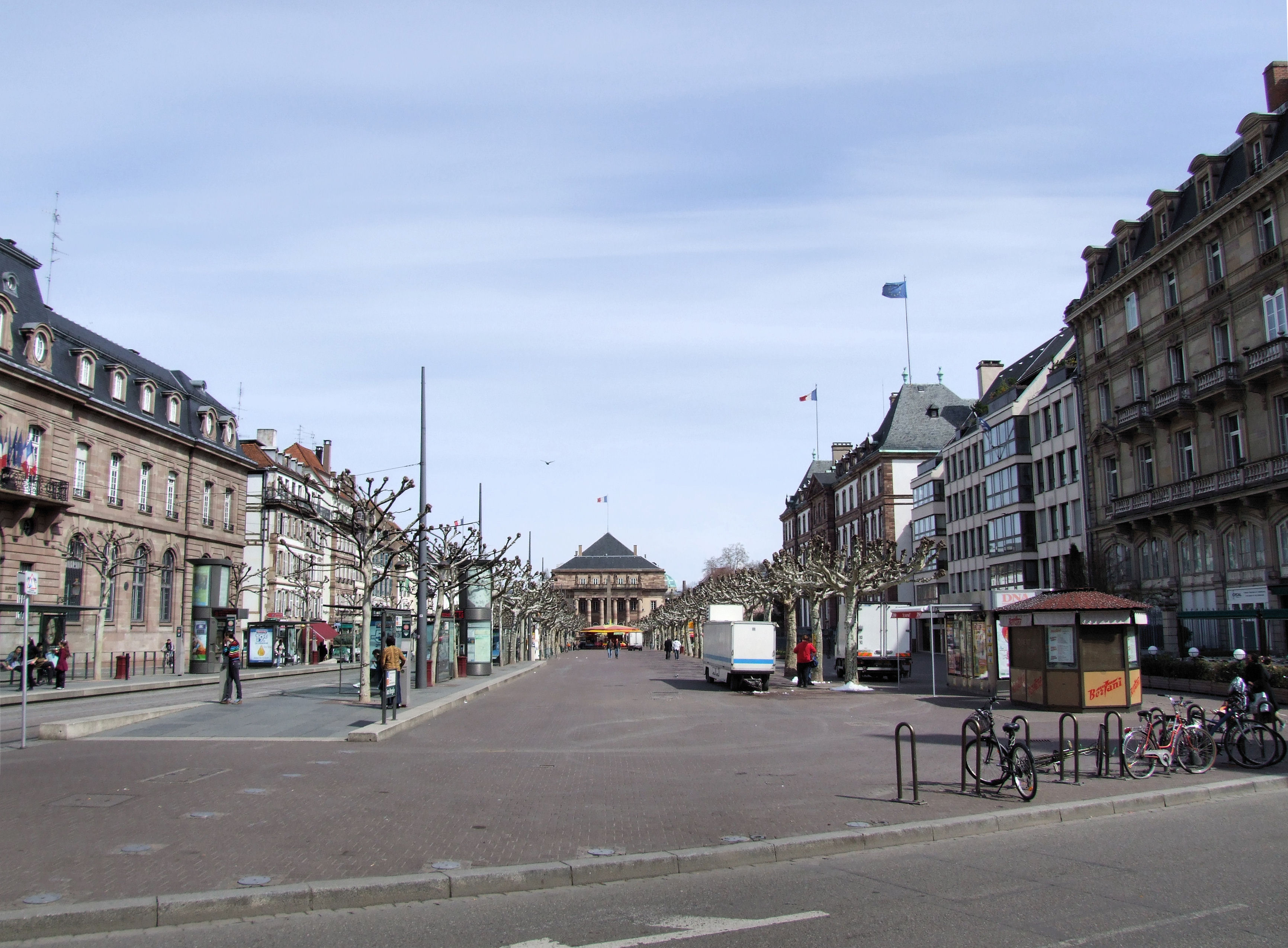
- The Place Broglie in 2010 with the Banque de France, city hall and opera house
- Interactive map of Place Broglie
- Type: Public square
- Location: Strasbourg, Alsace, France
- Coordinates: 48.585088°N 7.750421°E

The Place Broglie (Bröjel in Alsatian German) is one of the main squares of Strasbourg, France. It is located on the Grande Île, the ancient city center, and has an elongated rectangular shape that is some 275 metres (902 ft) long and 50 metres (160 ft) wide. It is notable for its prestigious surroundings: the Opera House, the City Hall, the Governor's Palace, the Prefect's Palace, the Strasbourg building of the Banque de France and the historic Mess building. Civilian architecture includes Renaissance (n° 2), Rococo (n°12), Art Nouveau (n° 1), Historicism (n° 22) and Half-timbered Alsatian style (n° 15). At the westernmost point of the square, close to the bridge Pont du Théâtre leading to the Neustadt stands the ″Janus fountain″ (fontaine de Janus), designed by Tomi Ungerer and inaugurated in 1988, for the 2000th anniversary of the first mention of Argentoratum.

At the site of the current Banque de France building (a grand Louis XV style edifice from 1925–1927) once stood the birthplace of Charles de Foucauld as well as the house of Philippe-Frédéric de Dietrich where Rouget de l'Isle reportedly sang the Marseillaise for the first time. These former houses and notable events are commemorated on the façade by a set of plaques.

A monument by Georges Saupique, close to the Opera House (a sandstone obelisk adorned with bronze statues), commemorates Philippe Leclerc de Hauteclocque and the Liberation of Strasbourg. It was inaugurated in 1951. A statue of François Christophe de Kellermann by Léon-Alexandre Blanchot (1935) stands nearby. A monument to the Marseillaise, a work by Alfred Marzolff (1922), is located next to the city hall.

== Transportation ==
The Place Broglie is a stop on the Strasbourg tramway, which is served by lines B, C and F.

The station stands between two big stops of the Strasbourg tramway : Homme de Fer and République.

- Tram B (Lingolsheim Tiergaertel - Hoenheim Gare)
- Tram C (Gare Centrale - Neuhof Rodolphe Reuss)
- Tram F (Comtes - Place d'Islande)
