= Flora of the Vosges massif =

Flora of the mountains of eastern France

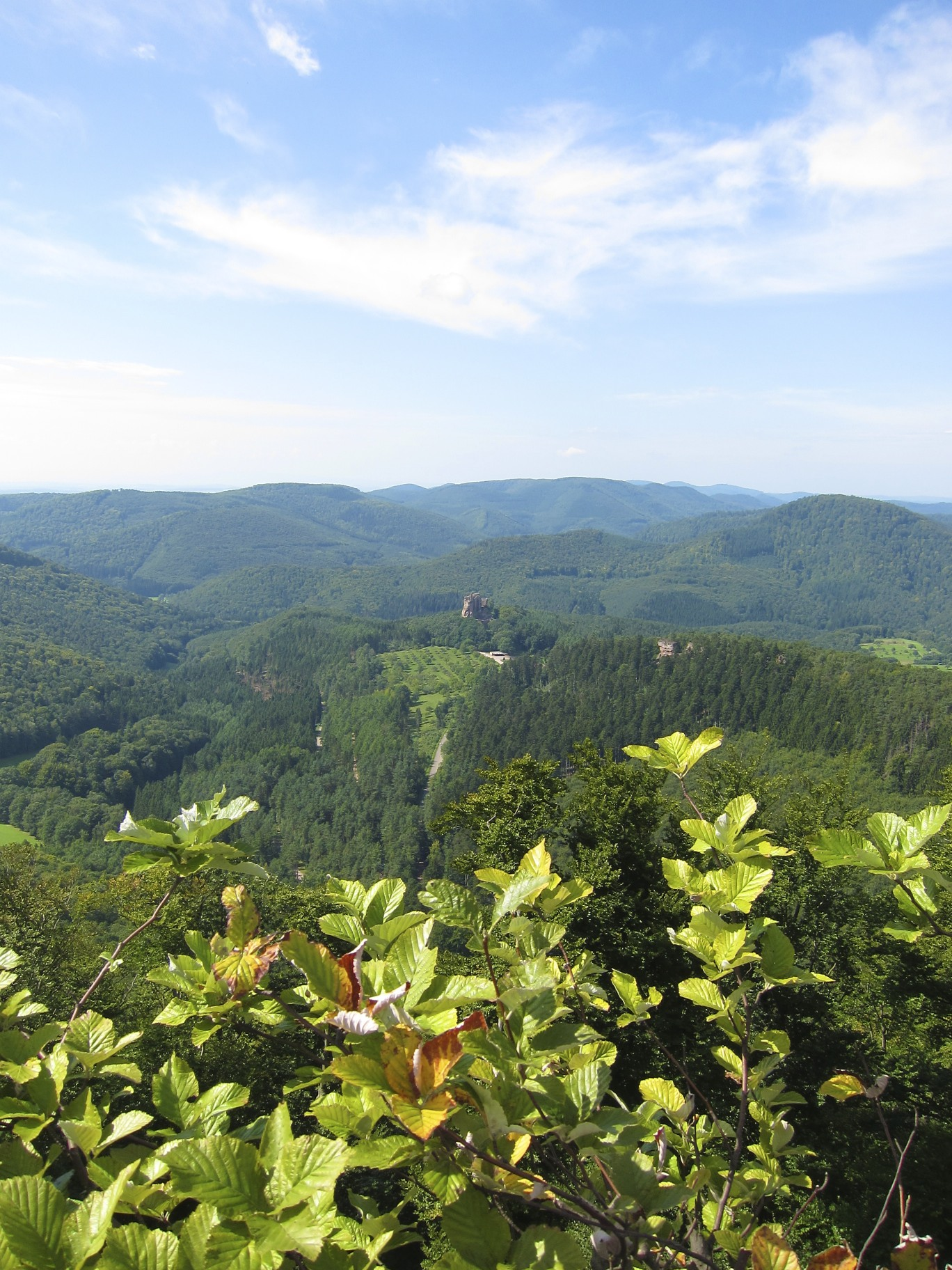
View of Lœwenstein Castle, Northern Vosges Regional Nature Park, Bas-Rhin.

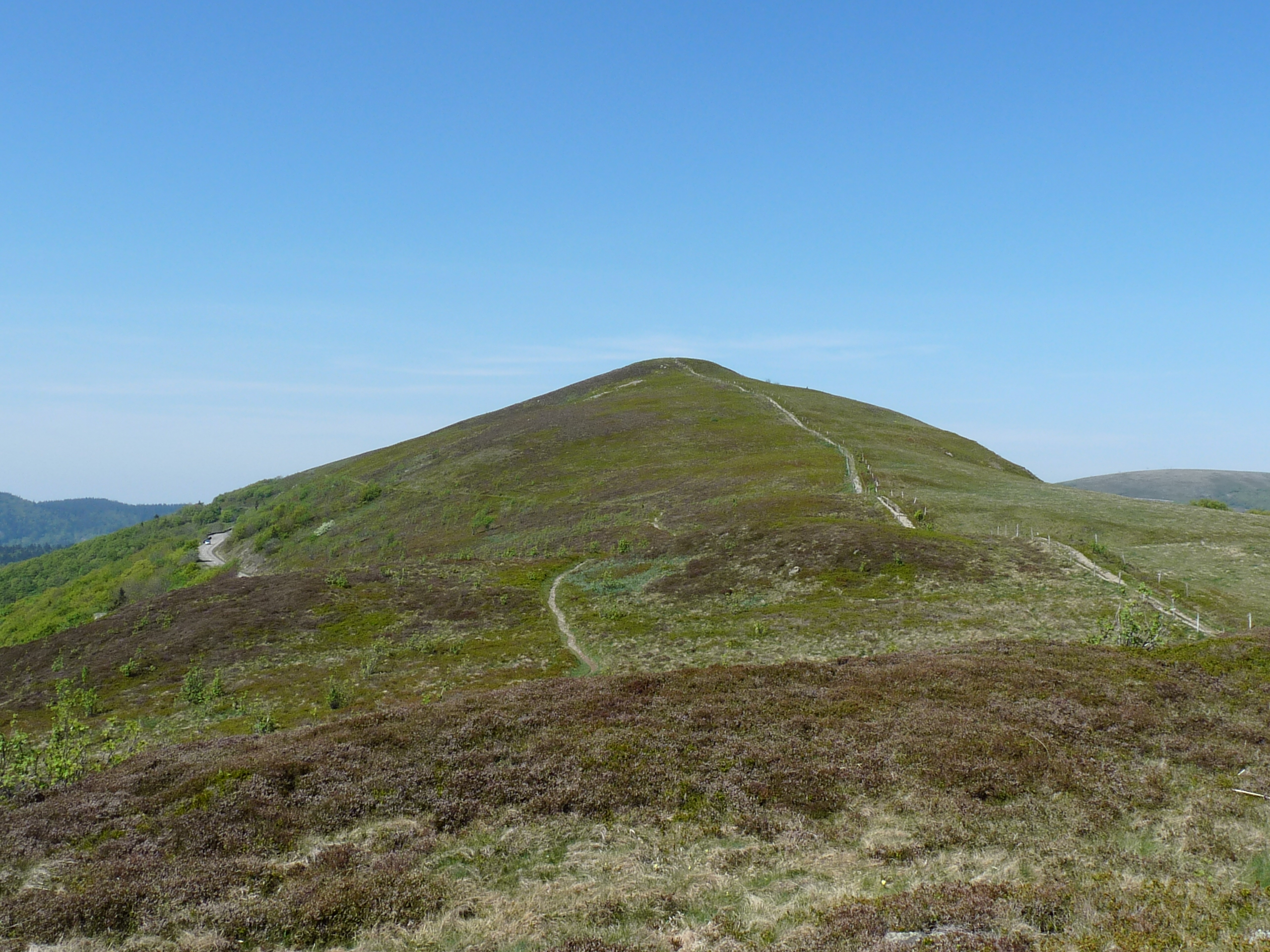
Haute chaume du Batteriekopf, Ballons des Vosges Nature Park, Haut-Rhin.

The flora of the Vosges massif is distributed across three principal altitudinal zones, namely the collinean, montane, and subalpine levels. The collinean zone extends up to approximately 500 meters in altitude. The montane zone is between 500 and 1,000 meters, with the subalpine zone extending beyond that. The latter's highest point is the Grand Ballon, which reaches 1,424 meters. The diverse environmental conditions, including altitude, climate, topography, and soil types, contribute to the formation of heterogeneous vegetation. The north-south orientation of the mountain range results in a marked contrast between the eastern and western slopes. The western slopes receive abundant precipitation from westerly winds, while the eastern slopes and peaks experience drier conditions.

The Vosges massif is characterized by a high degree of forest cover, with an estimated 60% of the total area comprising wooded land. In the lower elevations, below 500 meters, the forest primarily comprises oak-beech woodlands. At elevations between 500 and 1,000 meters, oak-beech woodlands transition into beech-fir forests. Above 1,000 meters, fir trees become increasingly scarce, giving way to high-altitude beech forests. These forests are characterized by stunted trees as altitude increases, eventually giving way to heathlands or mountain pastures, locally known as "high chaumes," at around 1,200 meters.

== Geographical environment ==
=== Location ===
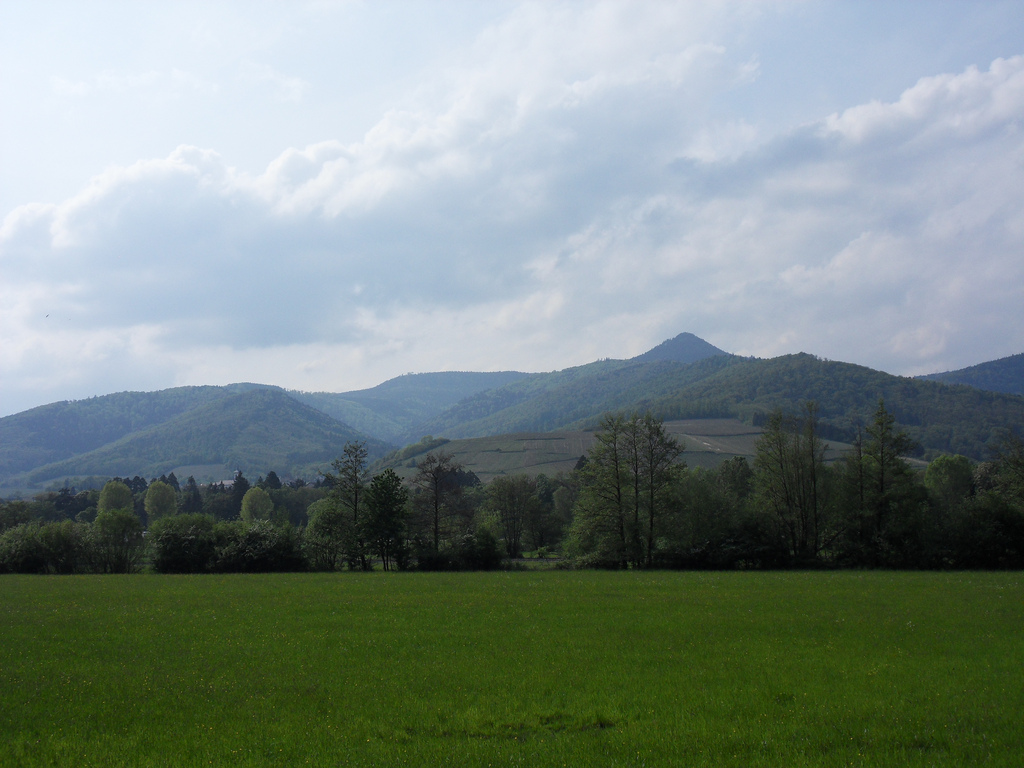
View of the Vosges balloons from the Alsace plain.

The Vosges massif is a mountain range in the northeastern region of France. The massif spans two regions. The region is situated in the northeastern part of France, spanning two administrative regions, Grand Est and Bourgogne-Franche-Comté. It encompasses seven departments, five of which are located in Grand Est (Vosges, Meurthe-et-Moselle, Moselle, Bas-Rhin, and Haut-Rhin) and two in Bourgogne-Franche-Comté (Haute-Saône and Territoire de Belfort). The massif extends 180 km from north to south, from Belfort in the south to the French-German border in the north, within the administrative region of Bitche.

The Vosges massif is geographically divided into two distinct sections: the High Vosges, which encompass the mountainous core of the massif (with elevations exceeding 500 meters), and the surrounding hills. The High Vosges can be further subdivided into two distinct geological regions: the crystalline High Vosges in the south and the sandstone High Vosges in the north. The mountain chain is primarily oriented along a north-south axis, with higher altitudes observed in the southern region. The surrounding hills include the Northern Vosges (or Low Vosges), the Vôge region to the west, which straddles the Vosges and Haute-Saône departments, the Alsatian under-Vosgian hills to the east, and the southern and western under-Vosgian hills. This region is home to two regional nature parks: the Northern Vosges Regional Nature Park and the Ballons des Vosges Regional Nature Park.

The altitude of the region in question typically ranges between 300 and 700 meters. However, the elevation varies considerably across the entire region, ranging from approximately 200 meters in the north to 1,424 meters at the Grand Ballon in the Haut-Rhin. The rocks that comprise the massif exhibit a distinct geographical distribution. In the northern region, they are predominantly sandstone, whereas in the southern region, they are primarily crystalline or metamorphic. The hills are characterized by loose siliceous formations, and the soils are deeper than those found in the mountainous region. The Alsatian side of the massif, situated to the east, is considerably steeper than the Lorraine side, located to the west. The Alsace vineyard is situated on the slope descending towards the densely populated Alsace plain, where agriculture is the dominant land use.

=== Climate ===
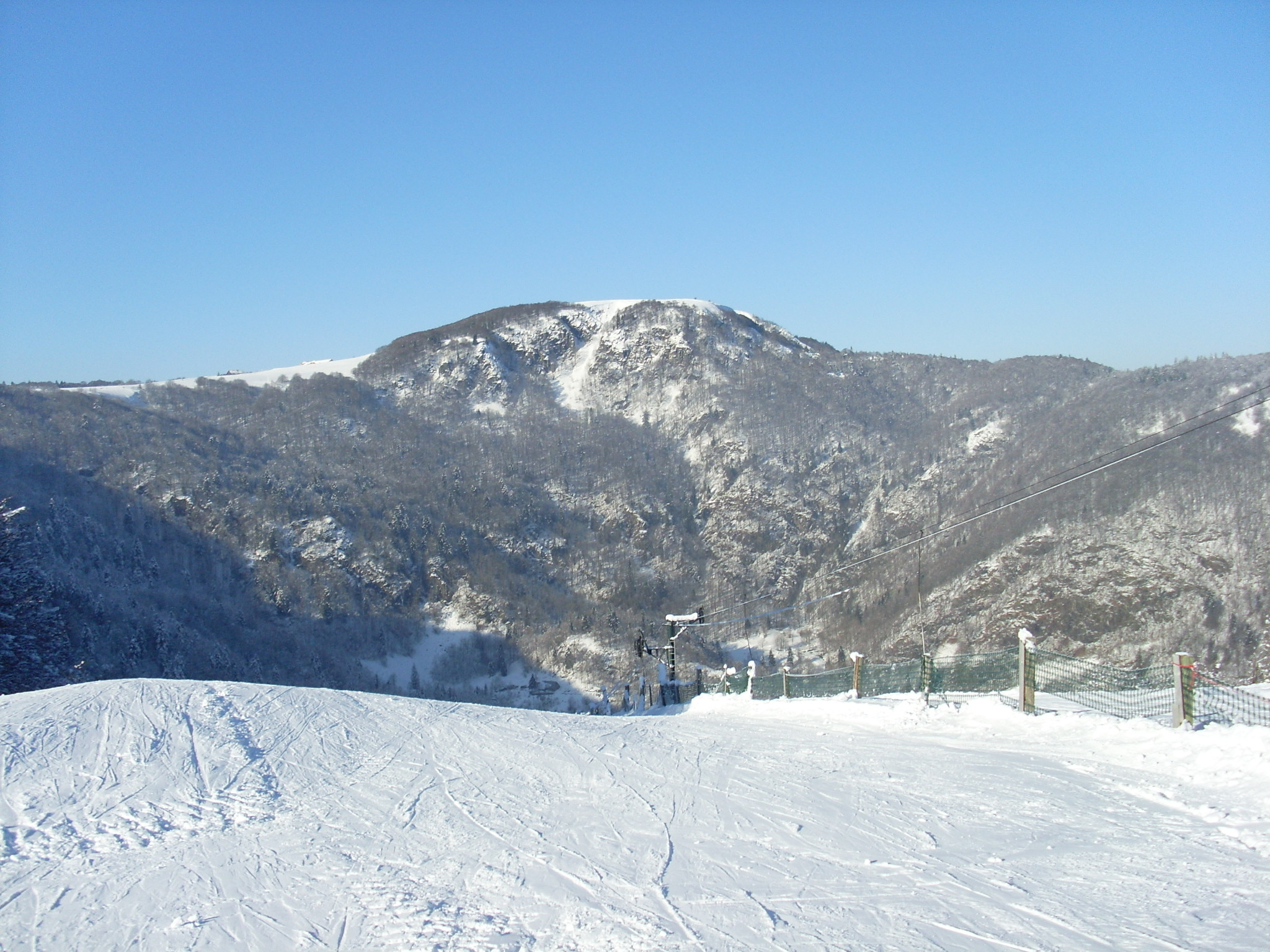
Summit of Ballon d'Alsace (east side) in winter.

The Vosges massif is characterized by an alpine climate, with humid and mild conditions prevailing during summer. In contrast, the winter season is characterized by low temperatures, frequently below 1 °C, and significant snowfall. The massif comprises three distinct zones: collinean, montane, and lower subalpine. The collinean zone extends up to 400 meters on the cooler, wetter western slope and up to 600 meters on the warmer, drier eastern slope. The montane zone, which extends from 400 to 600 meters in altitude, is followed by the subalpine zone, which begins at approximately 1,100 meters. This zone is primarily composed of increasingly stunted beech trees as altitude increases, with the presence of spruces and rowans. It also includes high-altitude pastures with rare and typical subalpine plants, such as the Alpine pasqueflower, yellow gentian, mountain arnica, Alpine hawkweed, and numerous others. The mountain range's north-south orientation results in a notable contrast between the eastern and western slopes. Westerly winds facilitate abundant precipitation on the Lorraine side and peaks, whereas the Alsatian side experiences reduced moisture levels. The Colmar region exhibits a markedly arid climate, with precipitation levels below 600 mm annually. The hill zone receives between 600 and 900 mm of precipitation annually, while the mountainous zone receives between 900 and 2,000 mm, with an increase in precipitation with elevation.

Furthermore, the region is subject to the influence of warm air masses originating in the south, which penetrate through the Rhine Rift. In mountainous regions, the topography exerts a significant influence on the climatic conditions, which are of paramount importance for the growth and distribution of vegetation. The mean annual number of days with temperatures below freezing ranges from 75 in the plains to 159 on the ridges. At the Hohneck, for instance, the growing season is reduced to three months, which is insufficient for trees to reach maturity. Late frosts are common occurrence, particularly concerning for fir and oak trees. Annual average temperatures exhibit considerable variation, ranging from 6 °C to 10 °C, with temperature ranges reaching 14 °C at the Hohneck and 18 °C in Alsace.

== Flora distribution ==
The Vosges massif is predominantly forested, with forests covering 548,530 hectares, or 60% of the massif's total surface area. Concerning surface area, the most prevalent tree species are the silver fir (Abies alba) and the beech (Fagus sylvatica), collectively representing 48% of the total area. The Norway spruce (Picea abies) follows with an area of 40%. In addition to the aforementioned tree species, the most prevalent across the entire Vosges massif are the sessile oak (Quercus petraea) (11%), Scots pine (Pinus sylvestris) (8%), mountain maple (Acer pseudoplatanus), and rowan (Sorbus aucuparia).

=== Flora of the collinean zone ===
The composition of forest stands in the hills is primarily influenced by three key factors: water supply, initial population density, and soil chemical richness. Among the various forest types, oak-beech forests are the most prevalent.

==== Oak-Beech forest ====
The collinean zone is characterized by the presence of oak-beech forests. On the western slope, characterized by higher precipitation levels, the beech (Fagus sylvatica) is the dominant species. In contrast, the drier Alsatian slope is more conducive to the growth of sessile oak (Quercus petraea). In areas with fertile soil, one may observe the presence of pedunculate oaks (Quercus robur), sycamore maples (Acer pseudoplatanus), field maples (Acer campestre), and common hornbeams (Carpinus betulus). Additionally, shrubs such as holly (Ilex aquifolium) are present. The forest species most suited to mineral-poor soils are the sessile oak (Quercus petraea), Scots pine (Pinus sylvestris), and silver birch (Betula pendula).

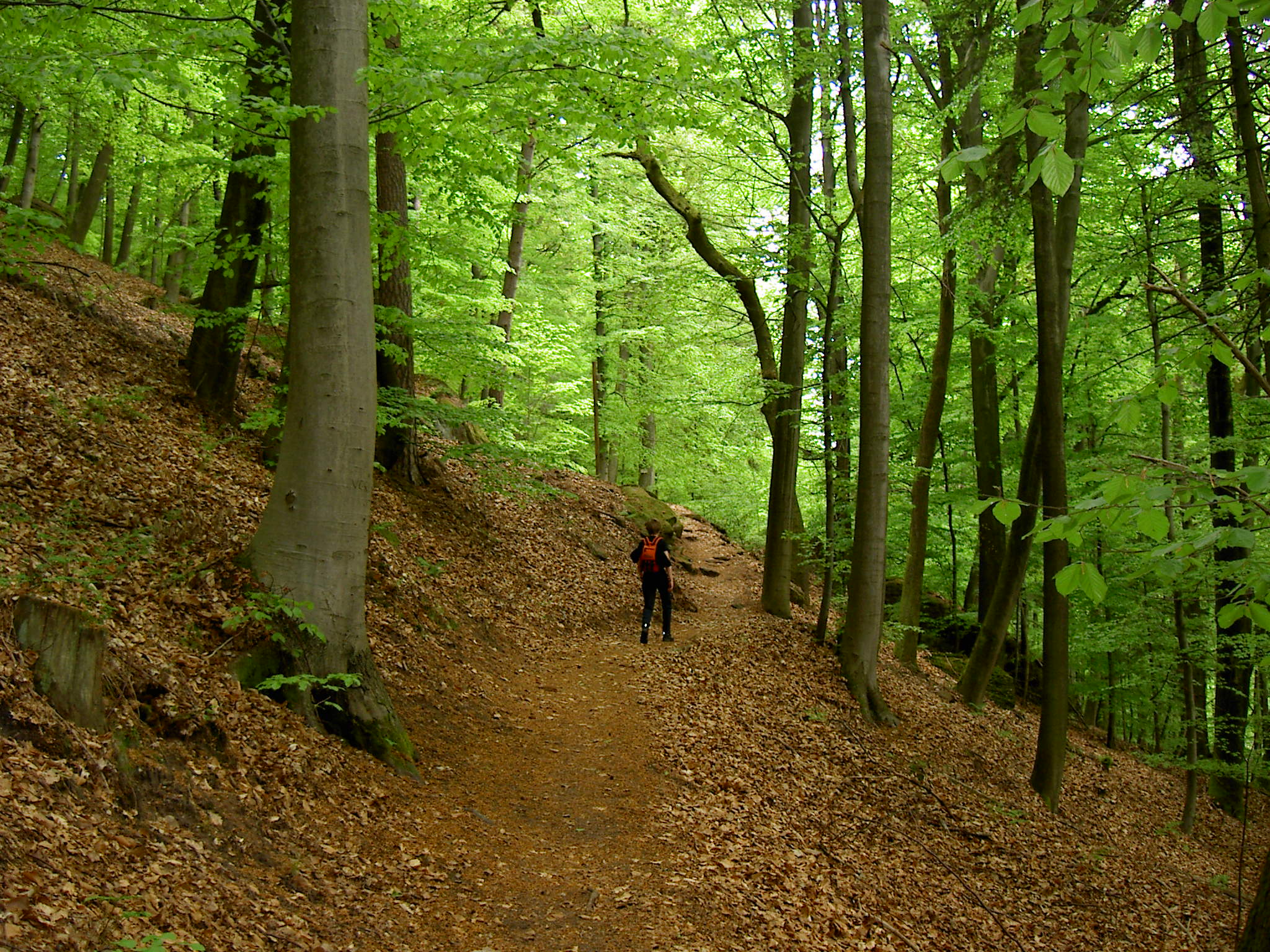
Beech forest in the Northern Vosges.

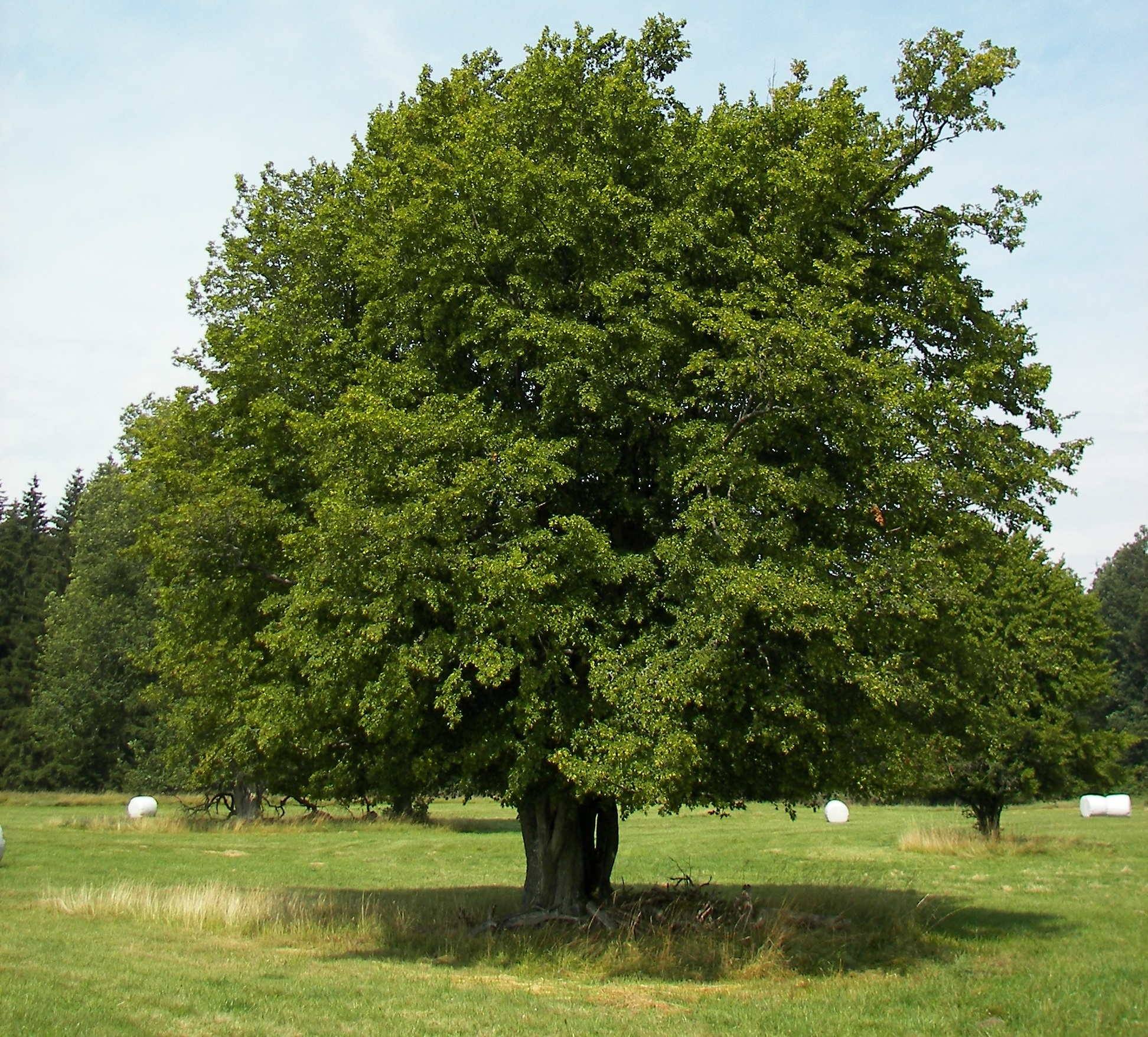
Common hornbeam.

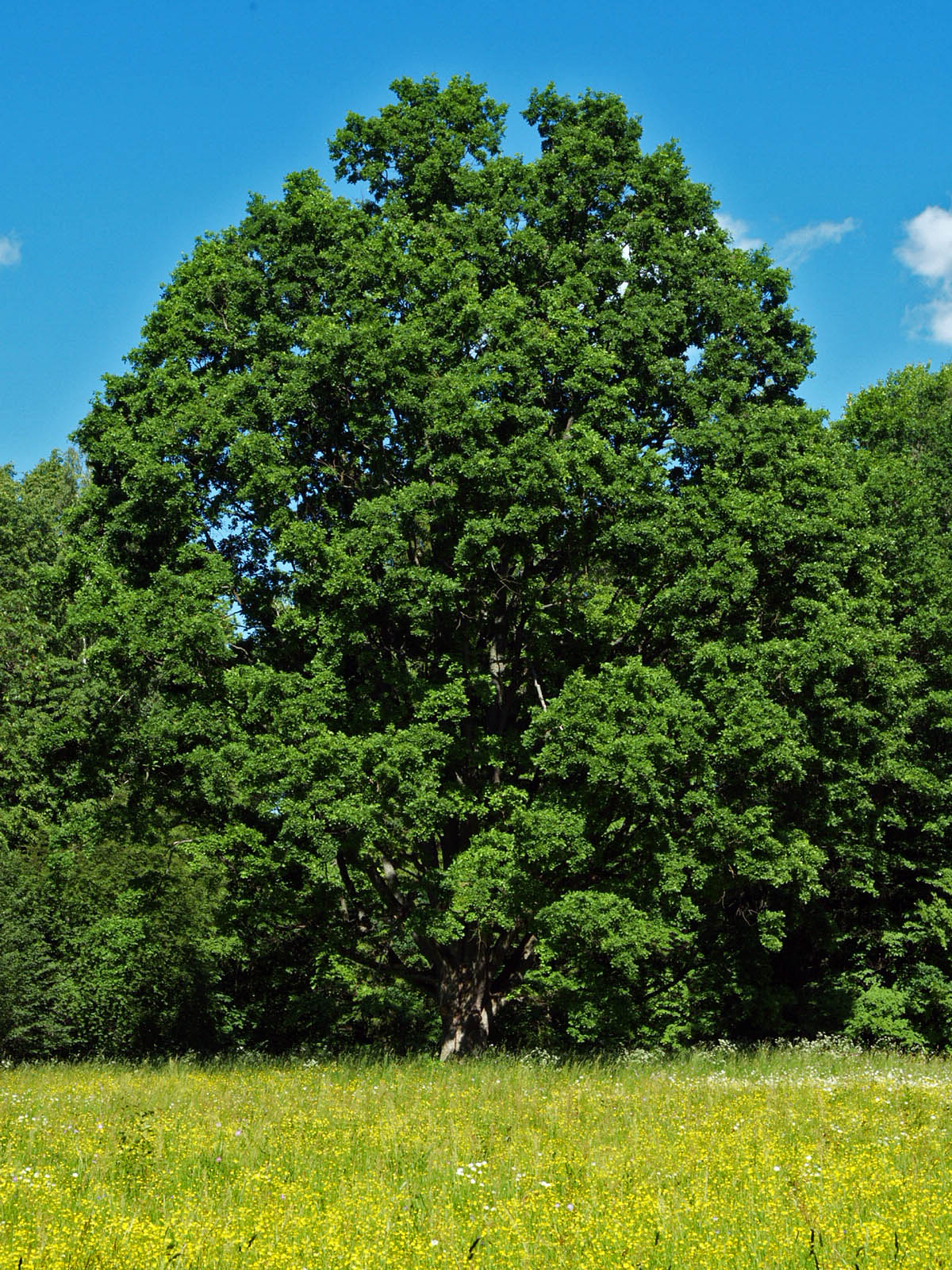
Pedunculate oak.

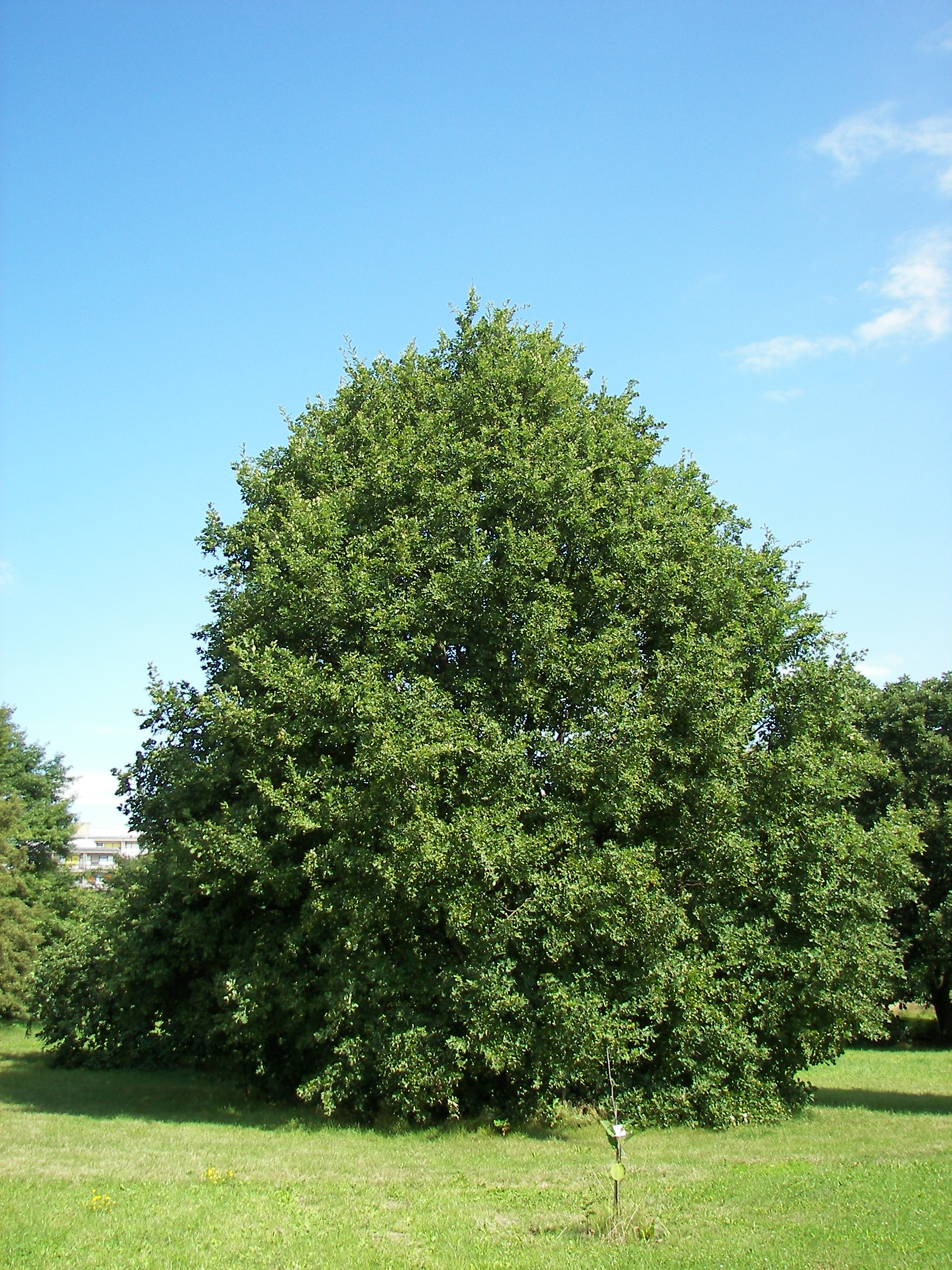
Sessile oak.

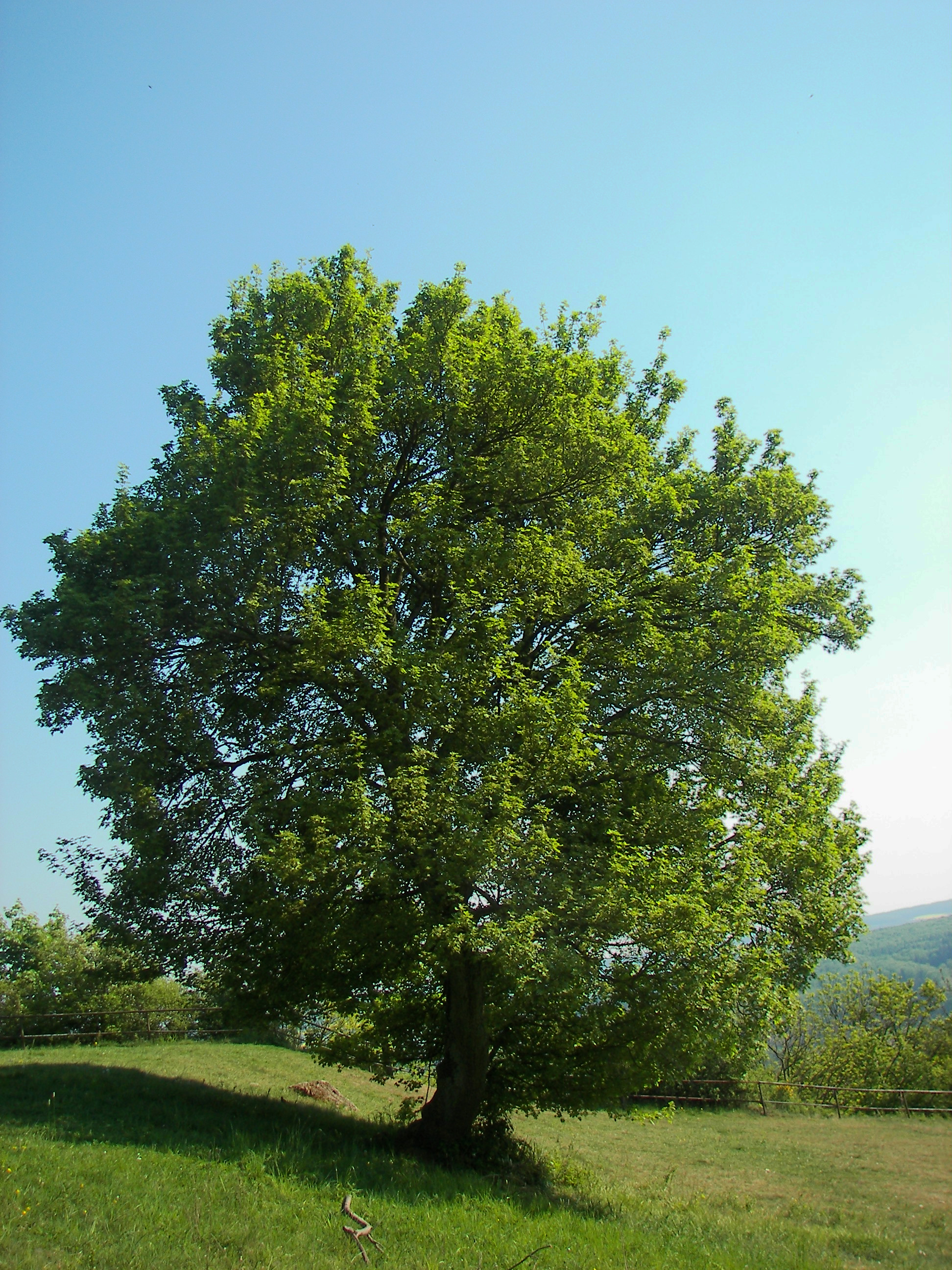
Field maple.

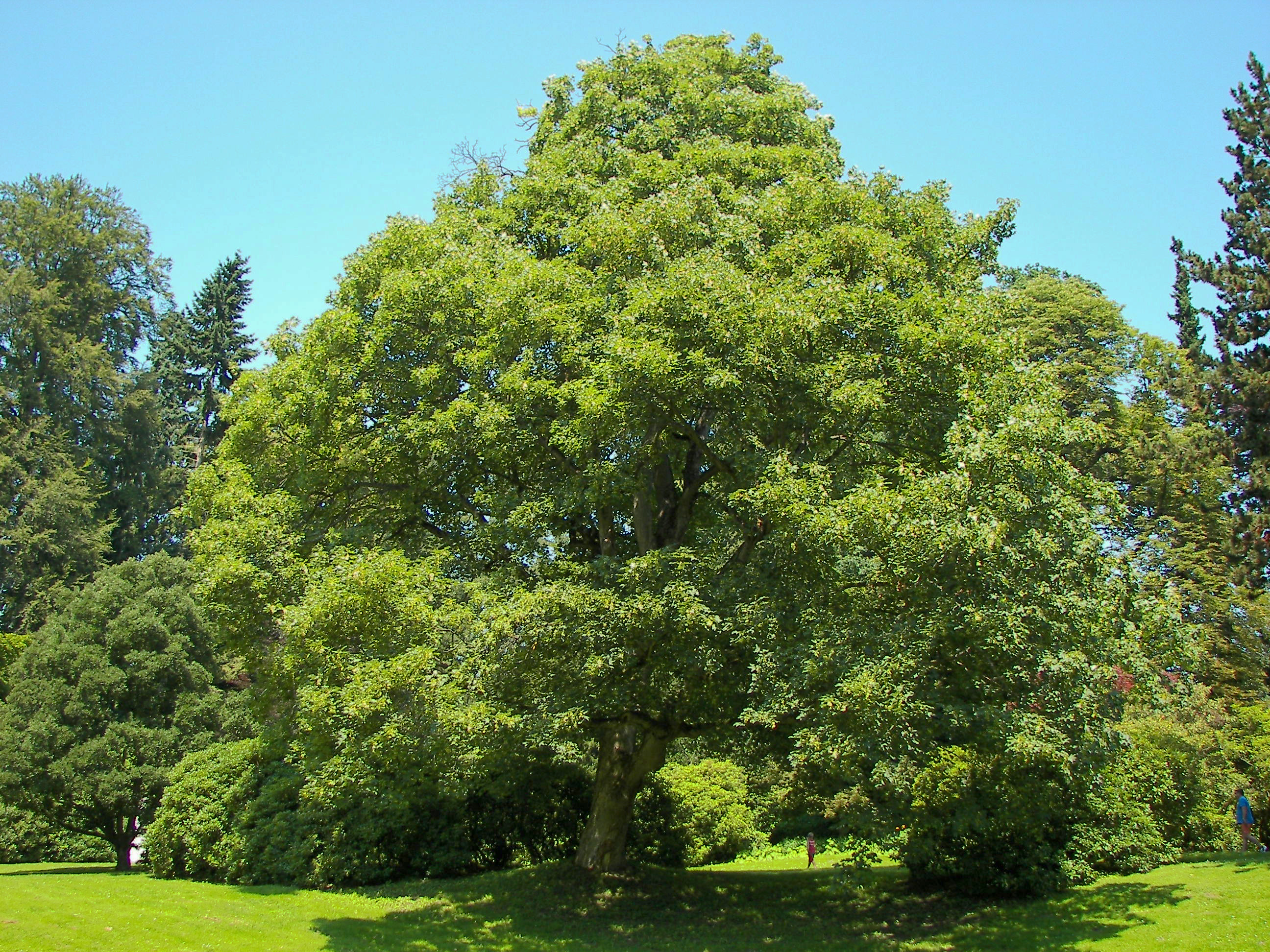
Sycamore maple.

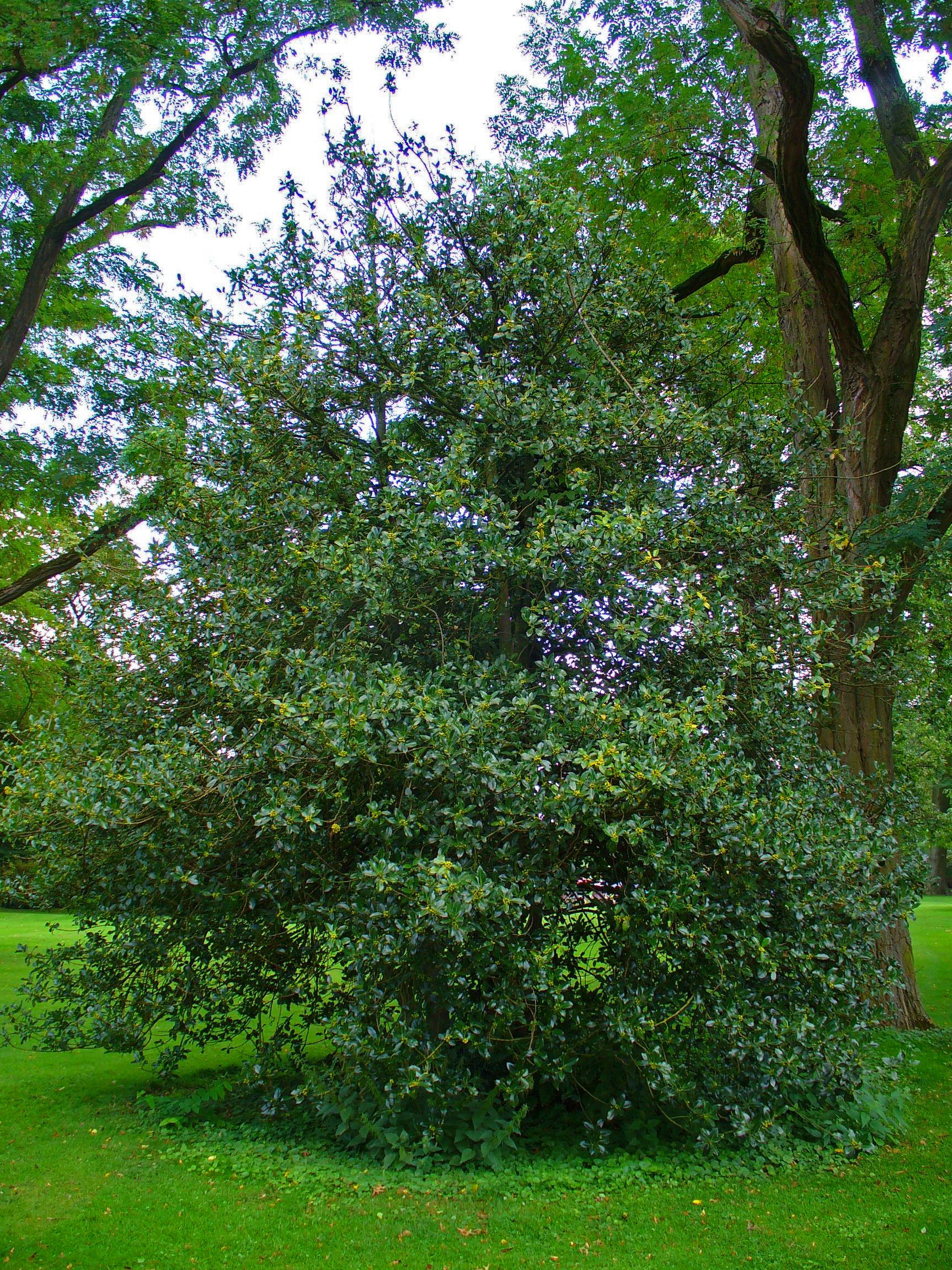
Holly.

The undergrowth is home to a variety of plant species, including narrow-leaved helleborine (Cephalanthera longifolia), sweet woodruff (Galium odoratum), Solomon's seal (Polygonatum multiflorum), wood violet (Viola reichenbachiana), and yellow archangel (Lamium galeobdolon).

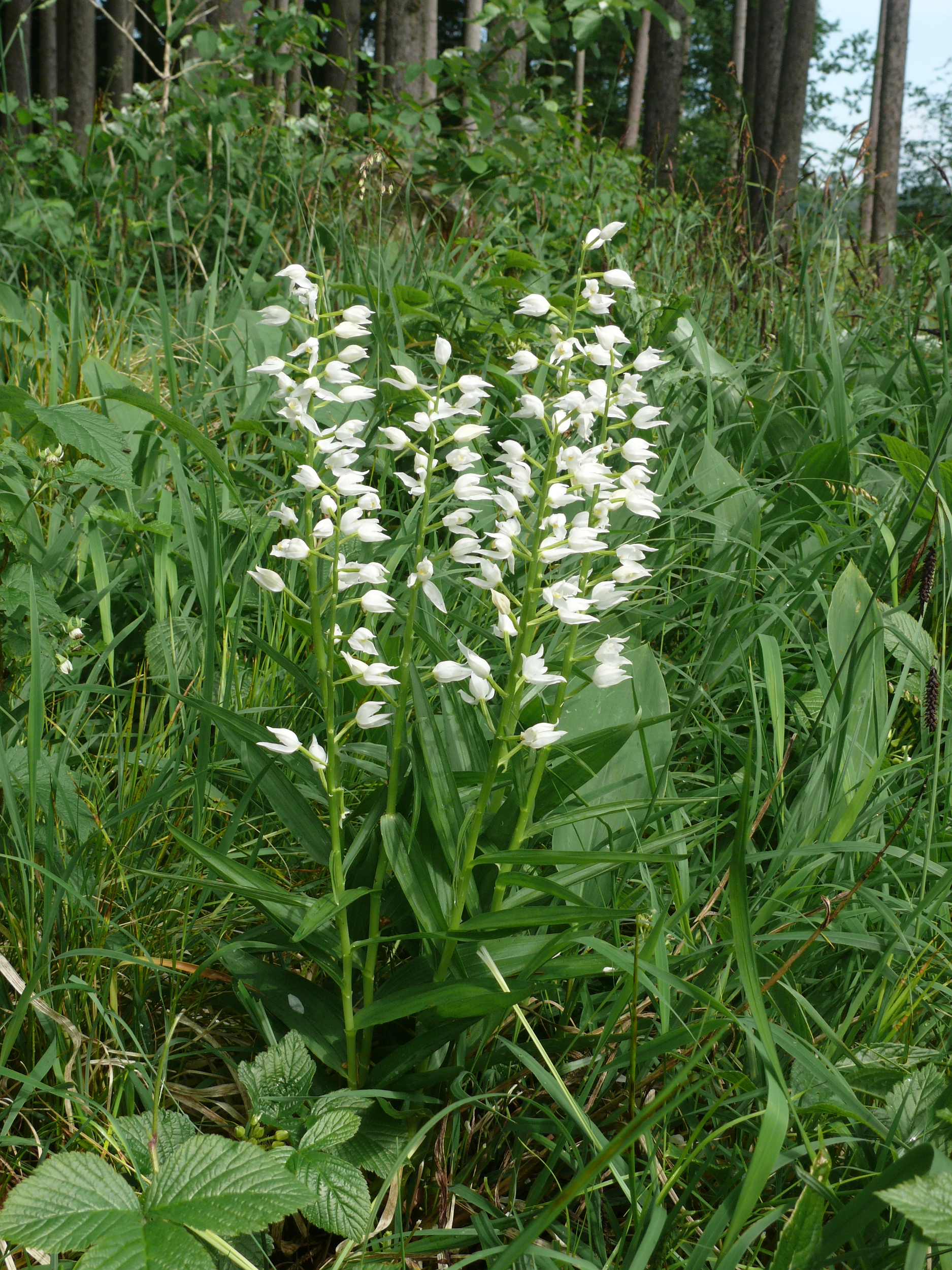
Narrow-leaved helleborine.

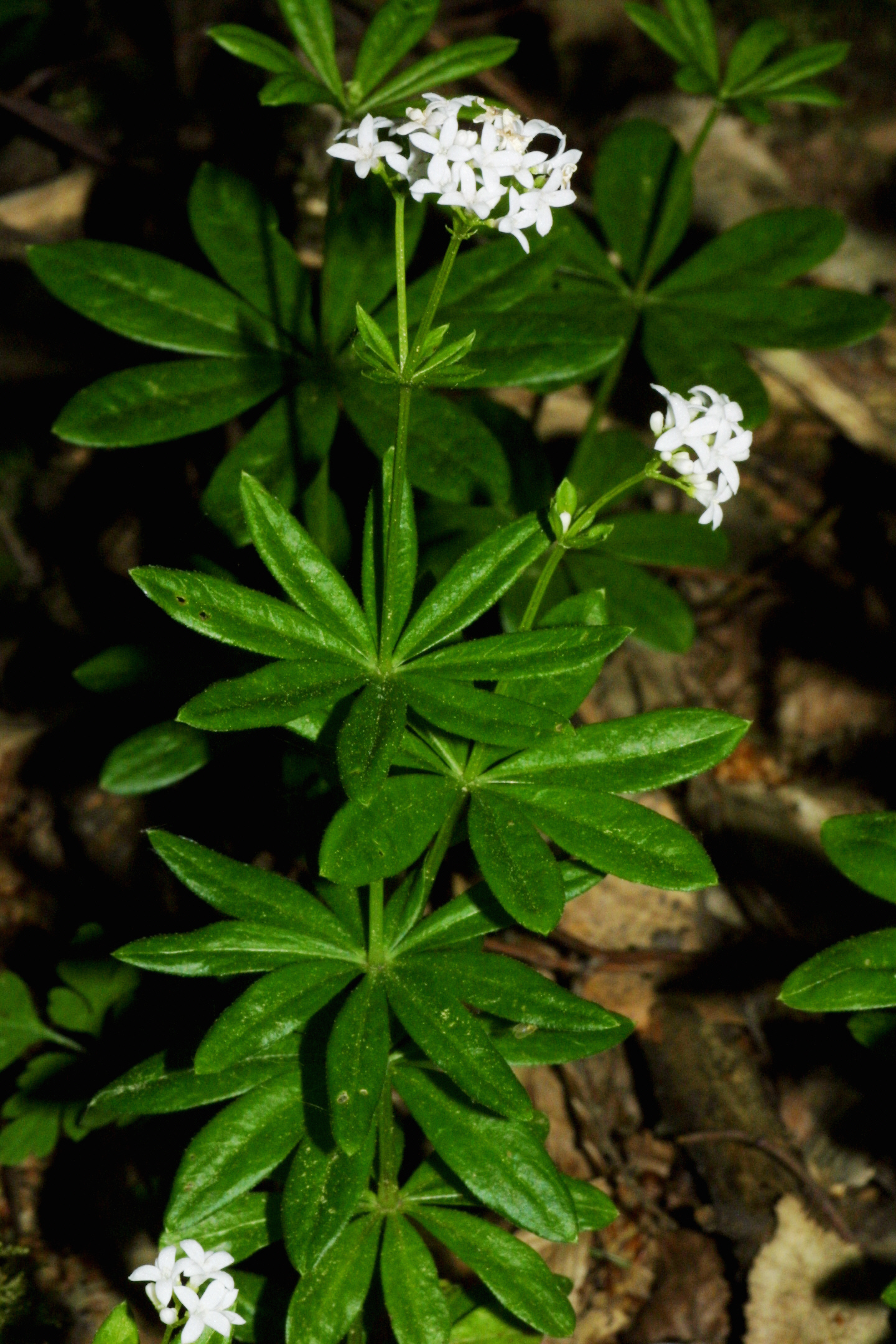
Sweet woodruff.

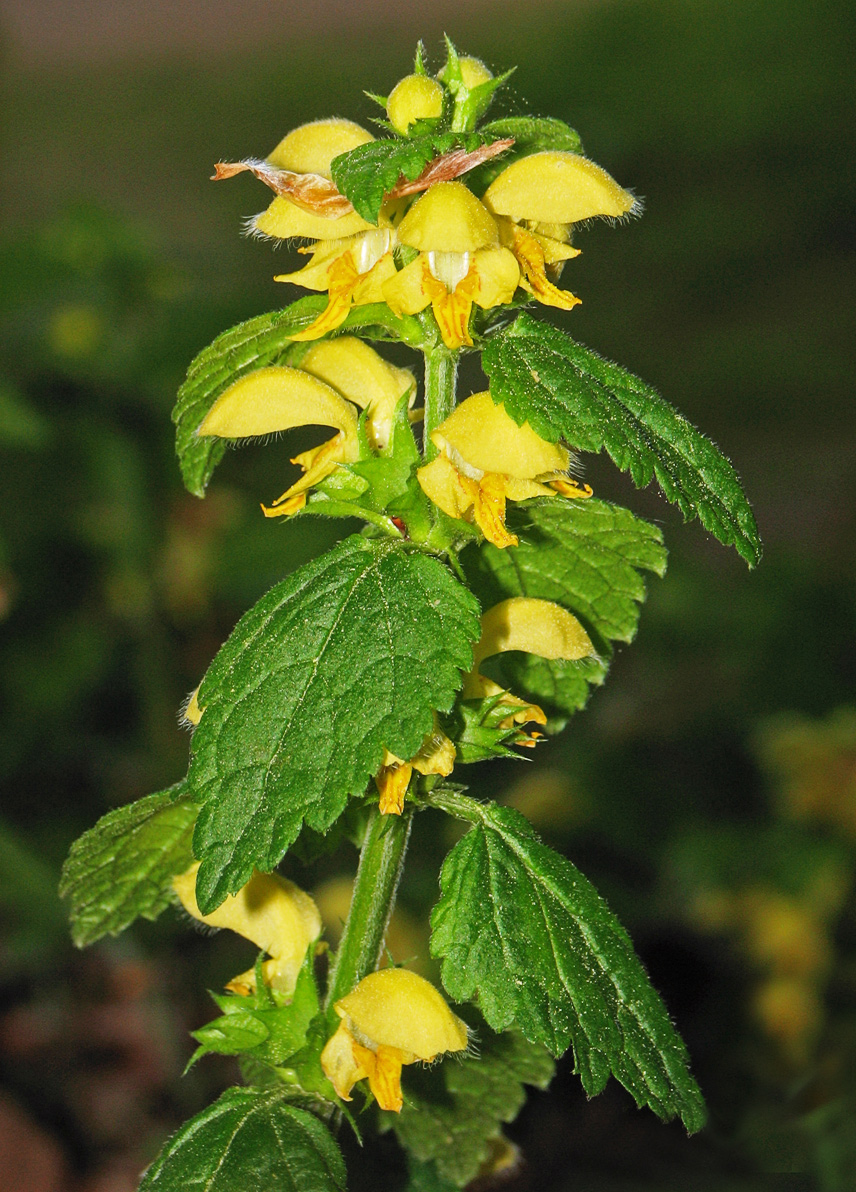
Yellow archangel.

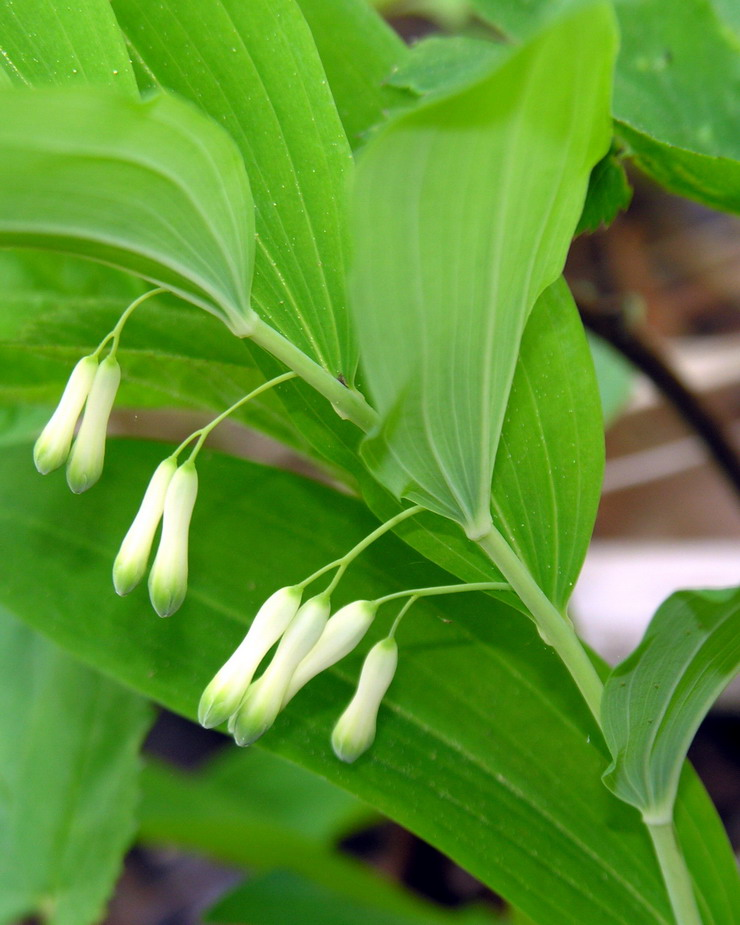
Solomon's seal.

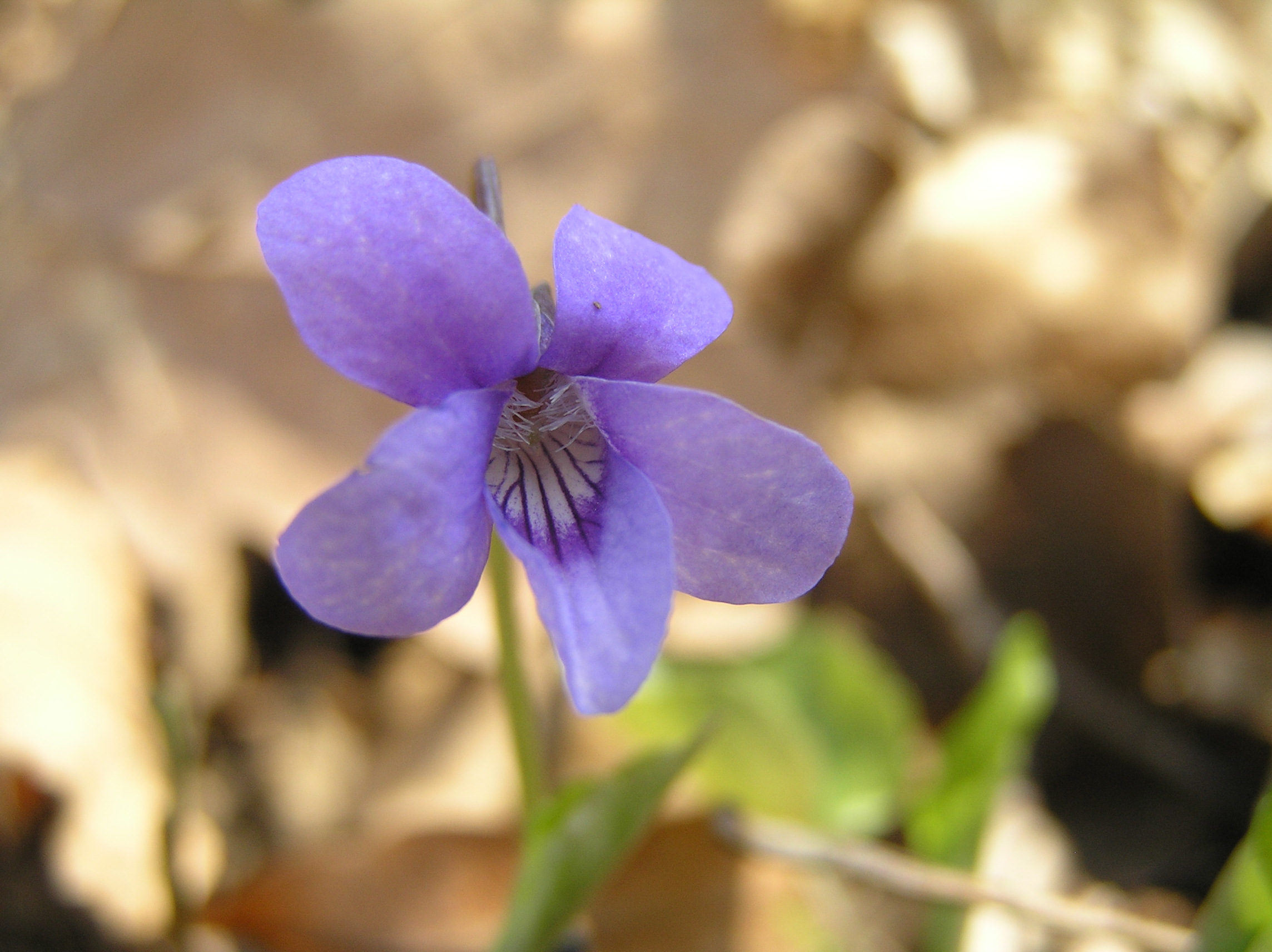
Wood violet

==== Alsatian limestone hills ====
The hills of hard, slightly altered limestone are situated in the Alsace region, sheltered by the Vosges massif. They rarely exceed 400 meters in elevation and overlook the Alsatian vineyards. The region's sunny conditions and low precipitation levels are conducive to develop heathlands and calcareous grasslands. In the hottest and driest parts of the limestone hills, downy oaks (Quercus pubescens) are to be found. In the undergrowth and at the edge of downy oak forests, one may observe the presence of forest orchids belonging to the genus Cephalanthera. These include the large-flowered helleborine (Cephalanthera damasonium), the narrow-leaved helleborine (Cephalanthera longifolia), and the red helleborine (Cephalanthera rubra). Additionally, the exceedingly uncommon dittany (Dictamnus albus) has been observed in the region. Moreover, the flora of these hills includes shrubs such as the common hawthorn (Crataegus monogyna) and the blackthorn (Prunus spinosa). Instead of the natural oak forest that formerly occupied the area just above the vineyards, exotic species have been planted. These include the European chestnut (Castanea sativa), a spontaneous species that occurs around the Mediterranean Sea, and the American black locust (Robinia pseudoacacia). The rot-resistant wood of the black locust is employed in the fabrication of vine poles and stakes, while the erect brome (Bromus erectus) and sheep fescue (Festuca ovina) grasslands are utilized as tool handles.

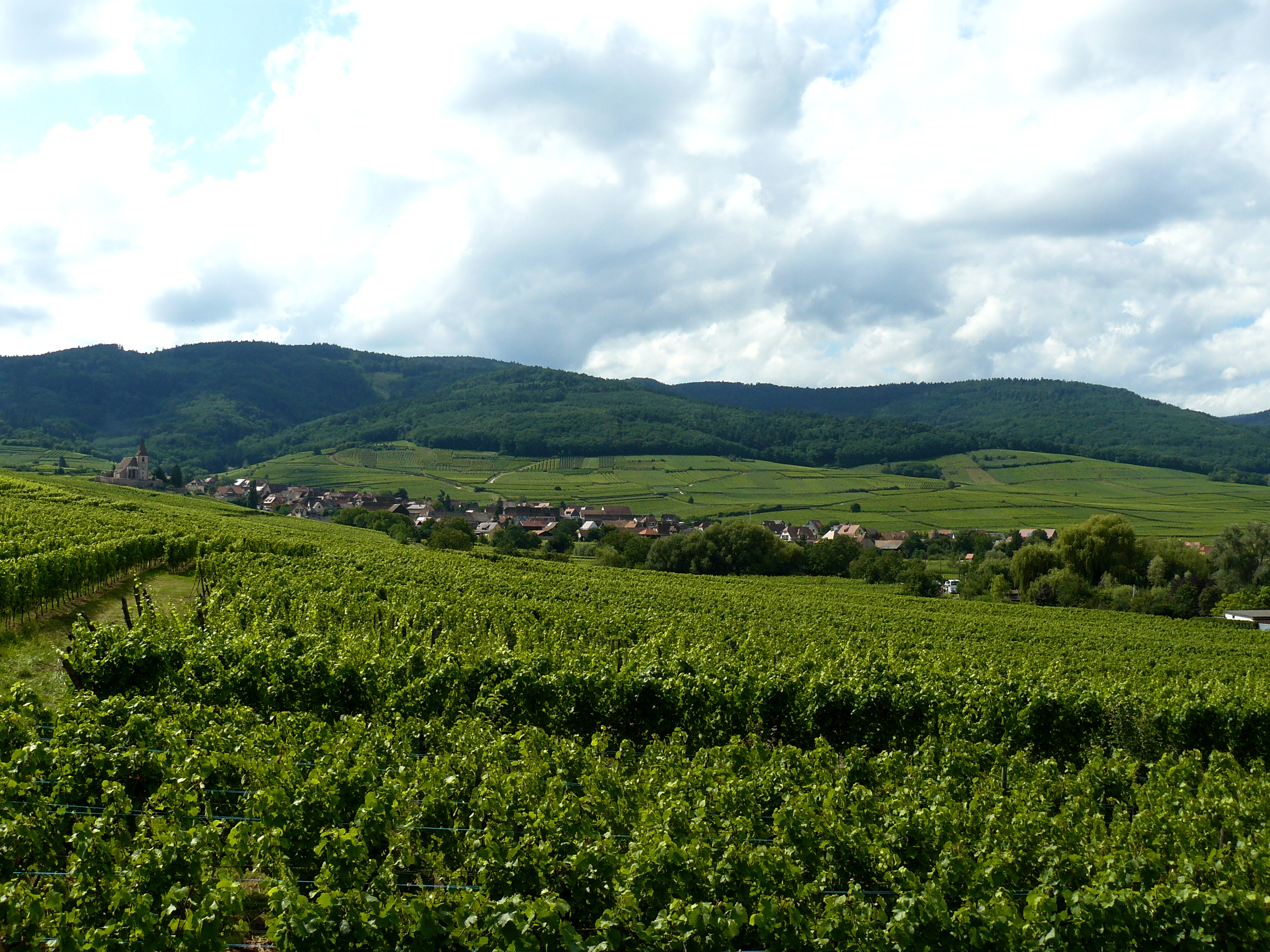
Vineyards in the Hunawihr hills.

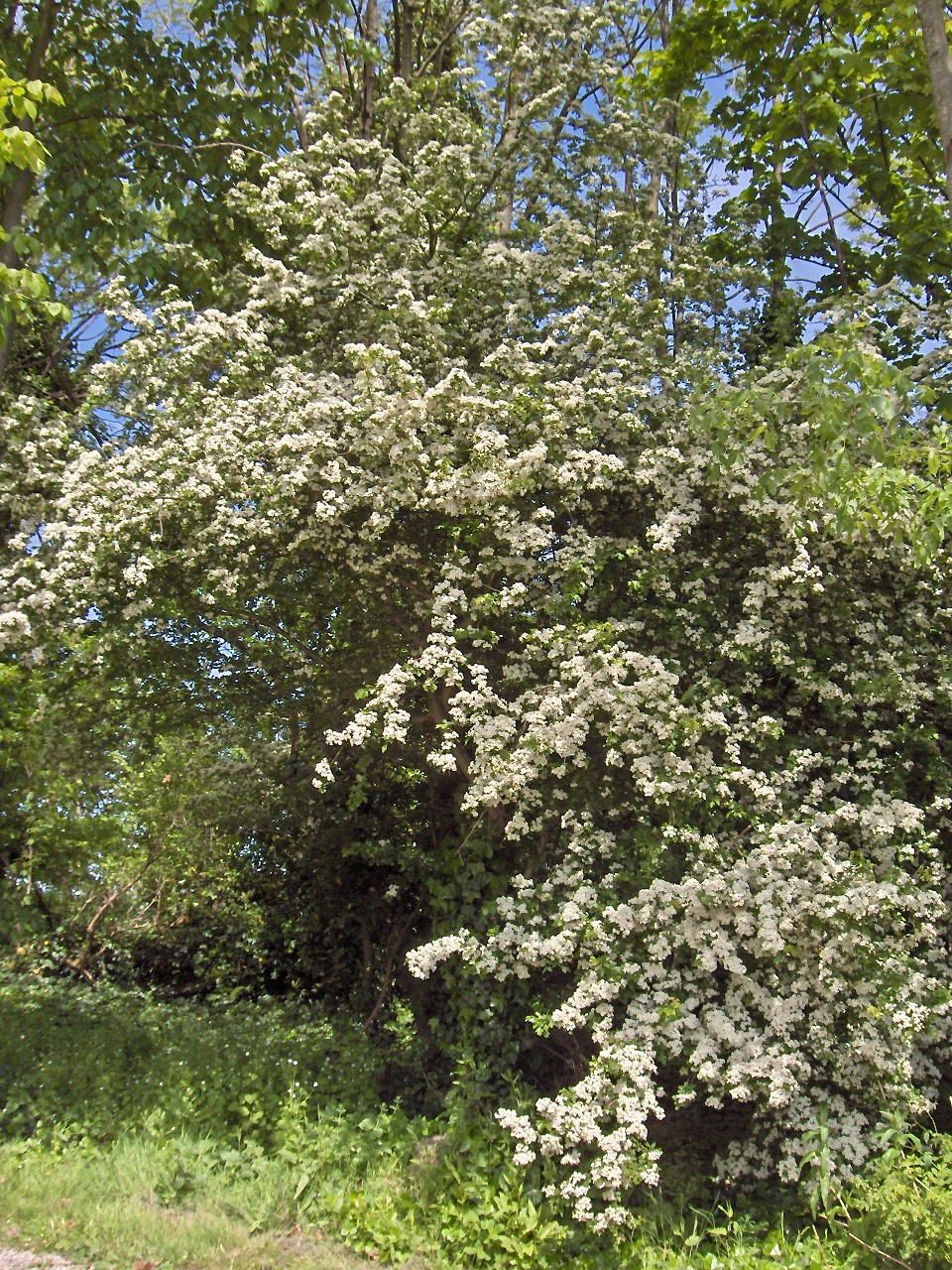
Common hawthorn.

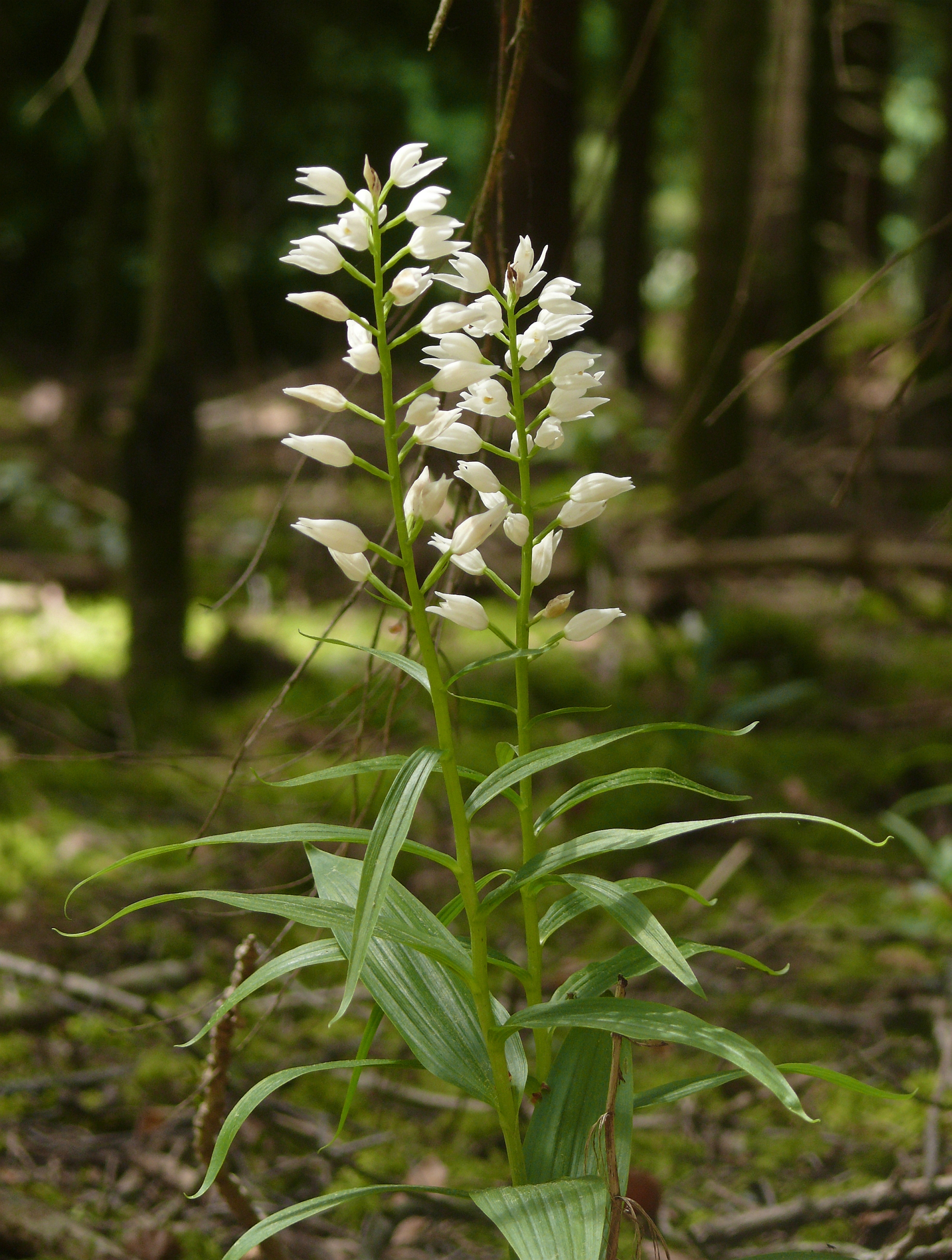
Narrow-leaved helleborine.

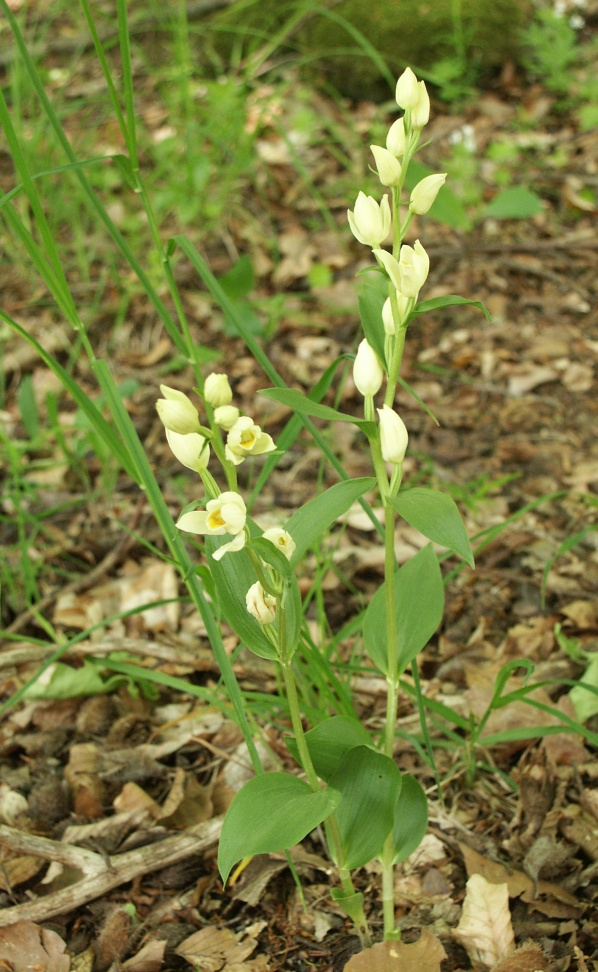
Large-flowered helleborine

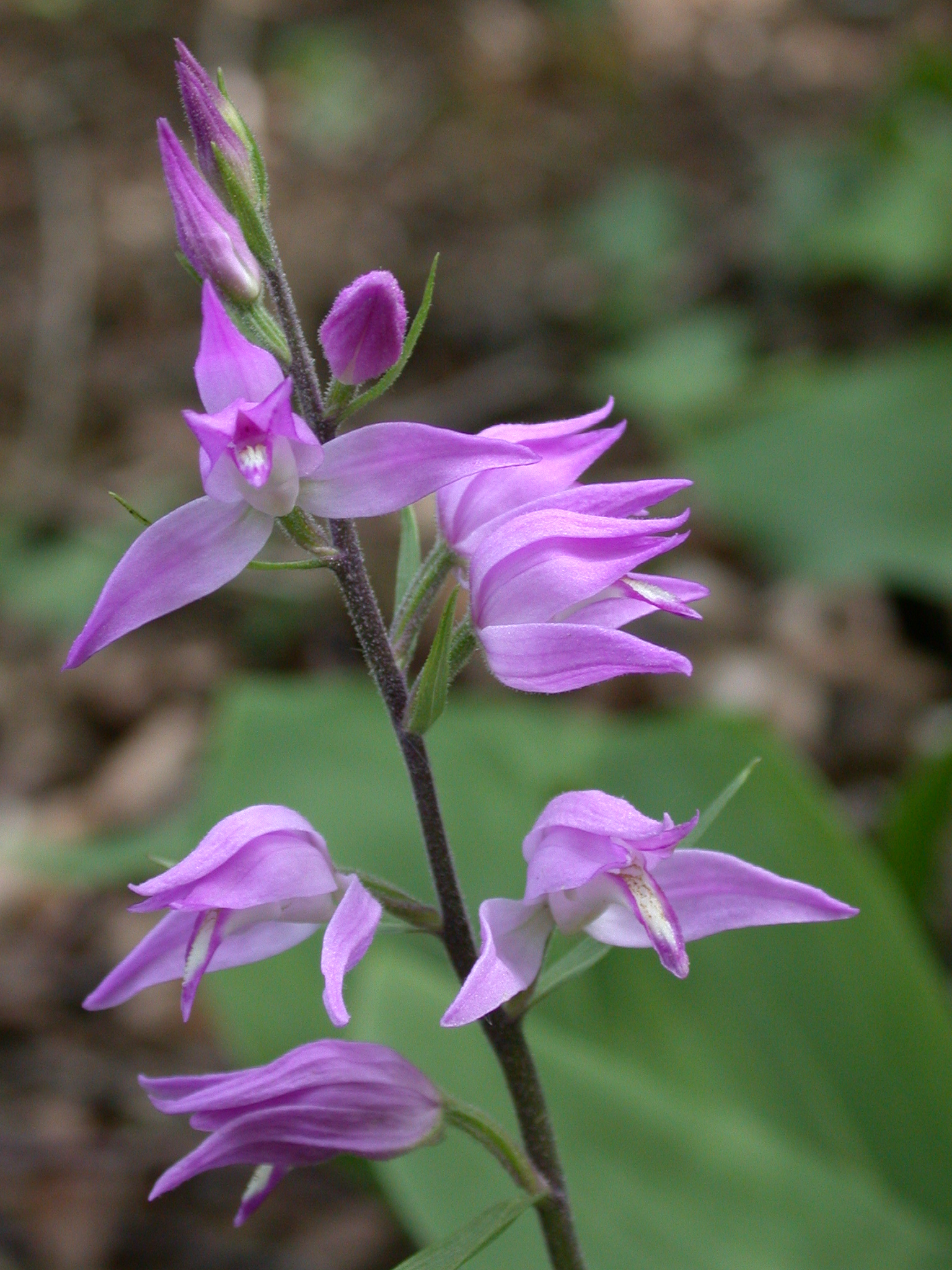
Red helleborine.

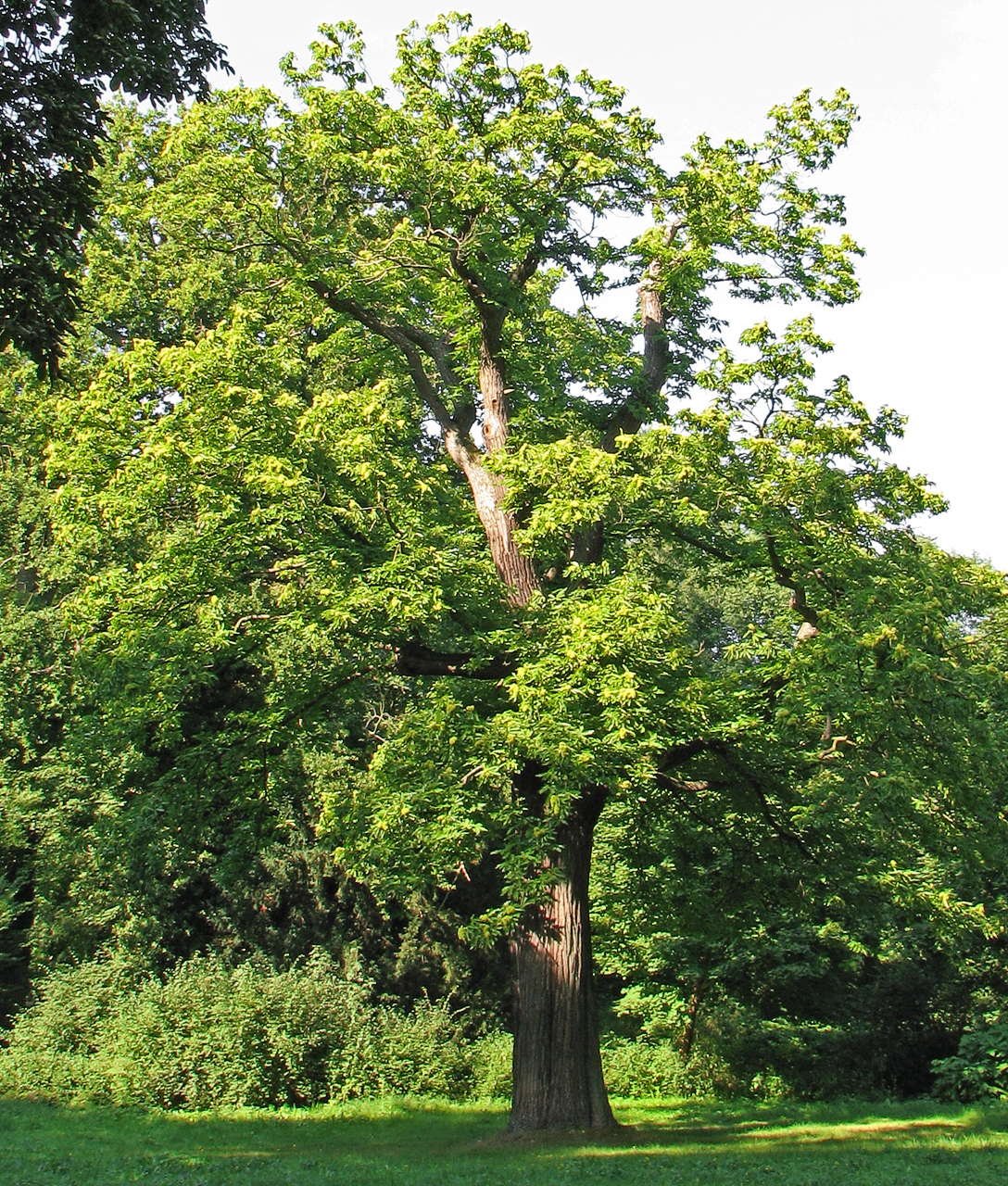
European chestnut.

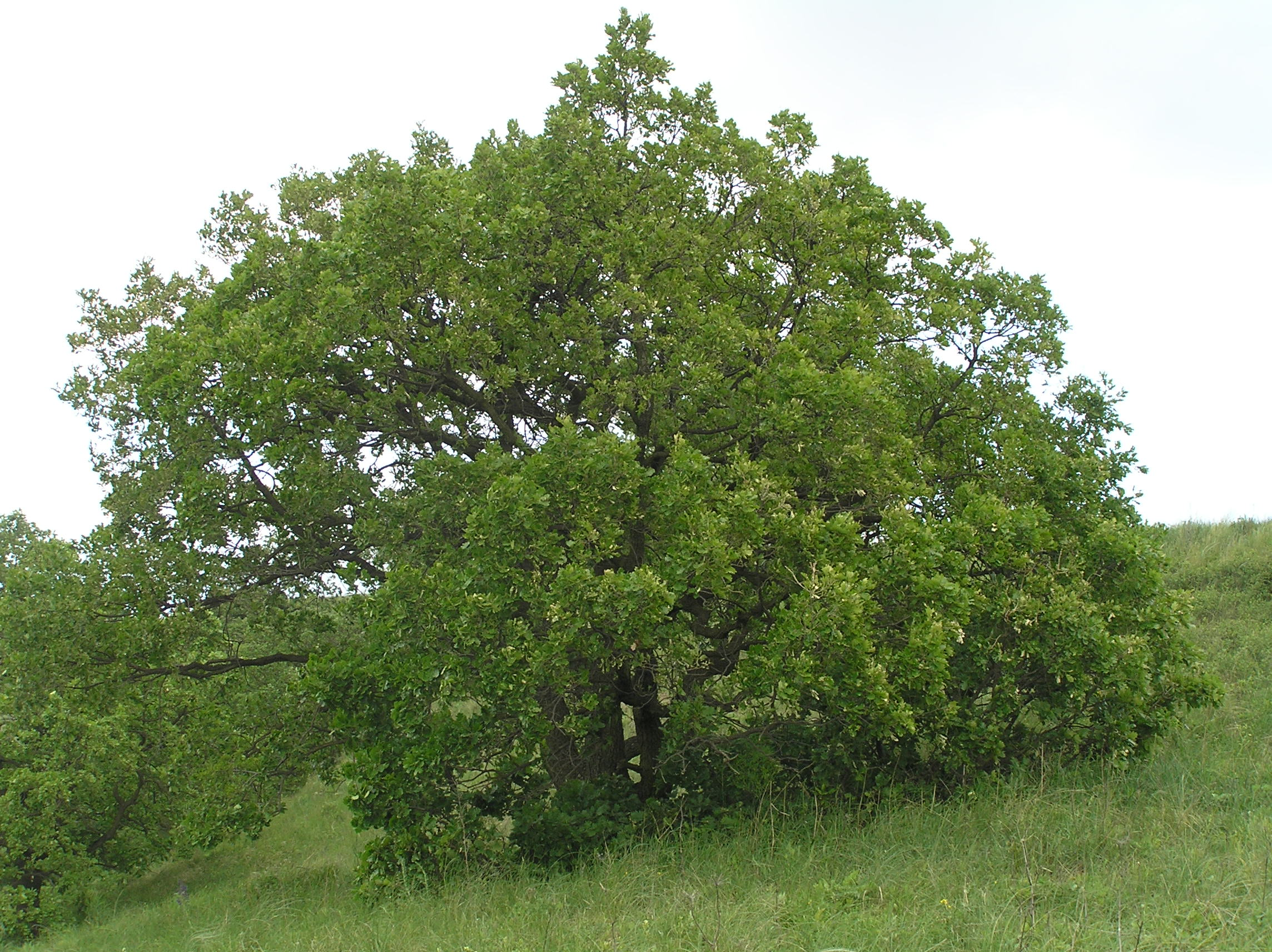
Downy oak.

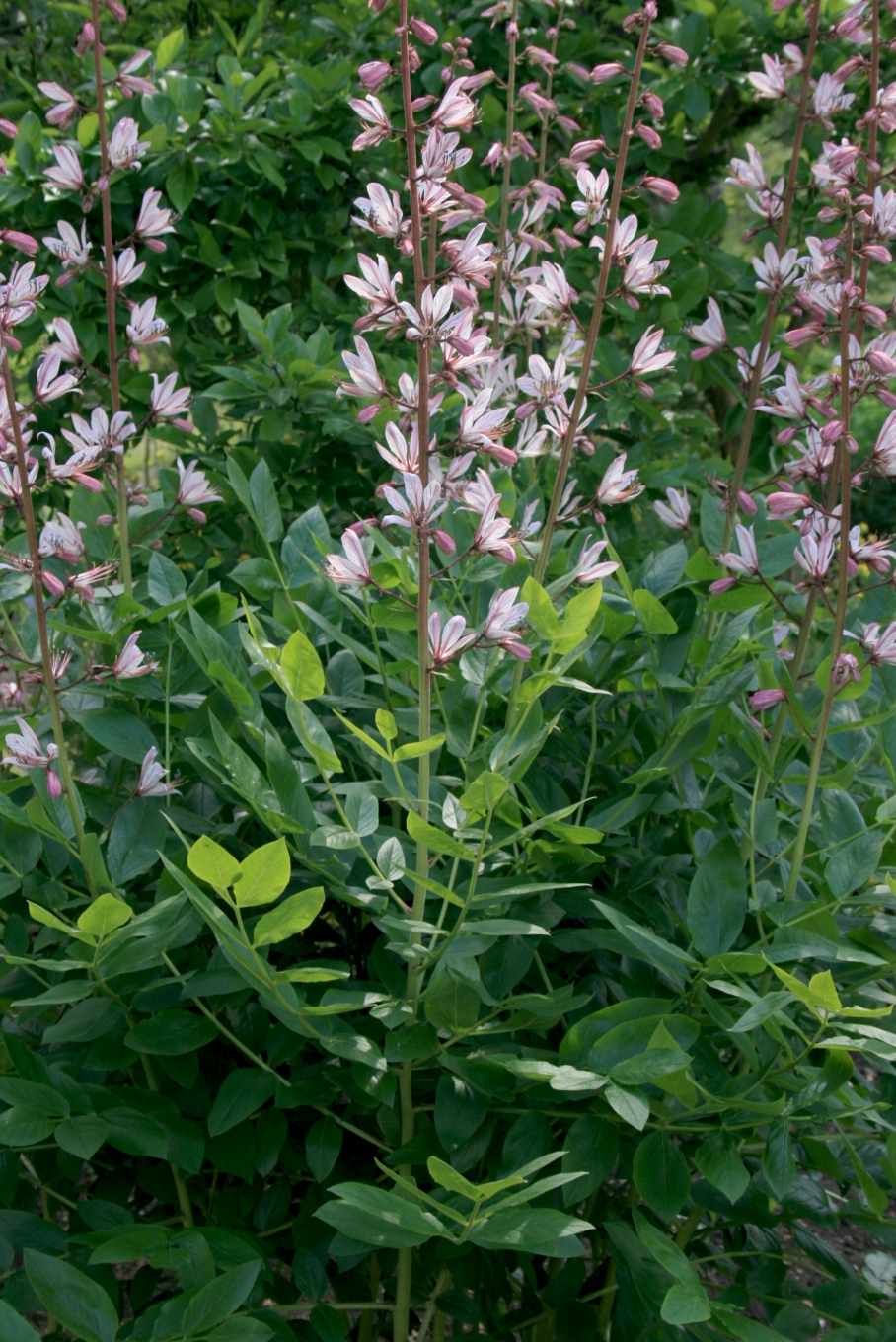
Fraxinella.

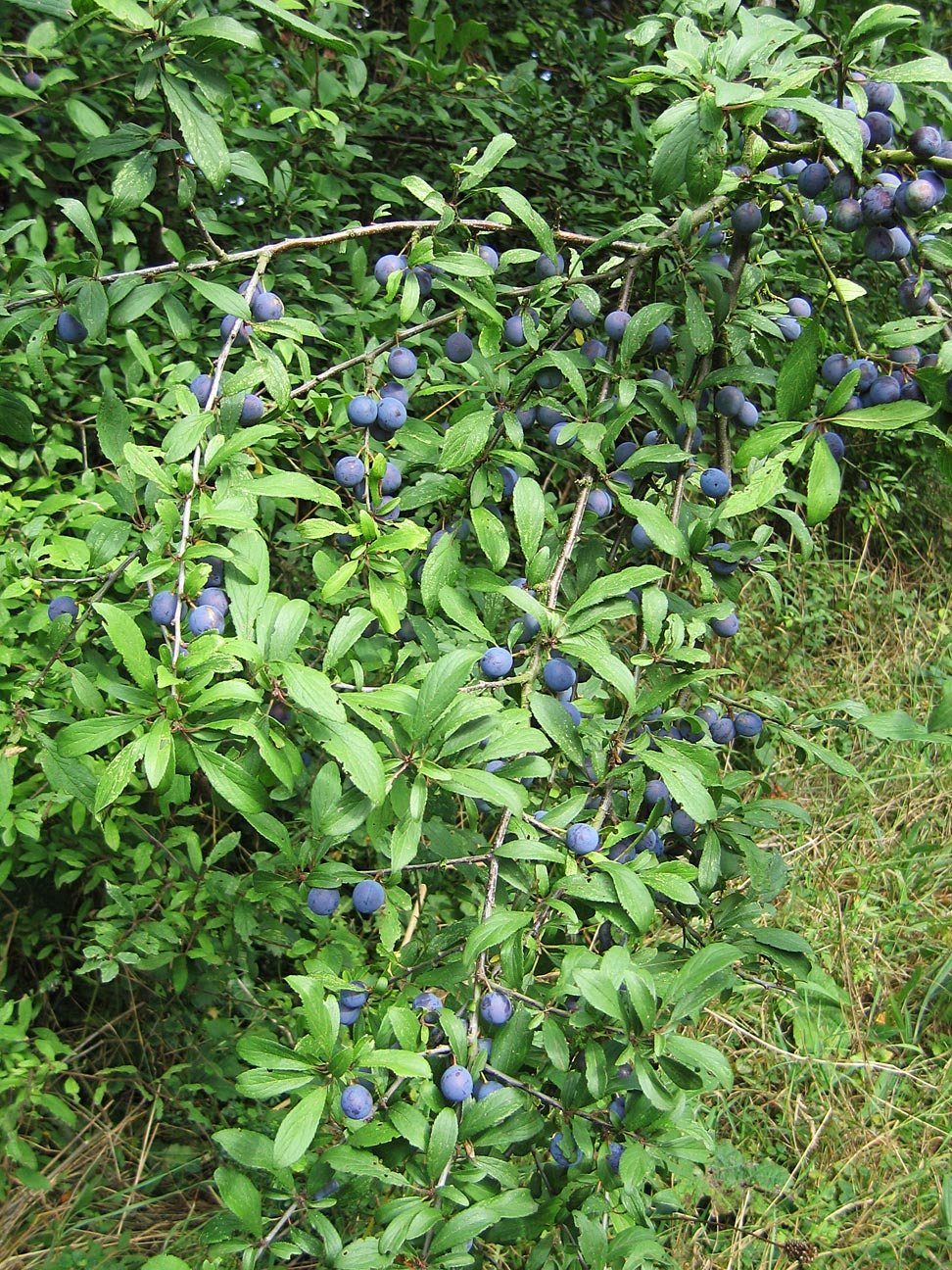
Blackthorn.

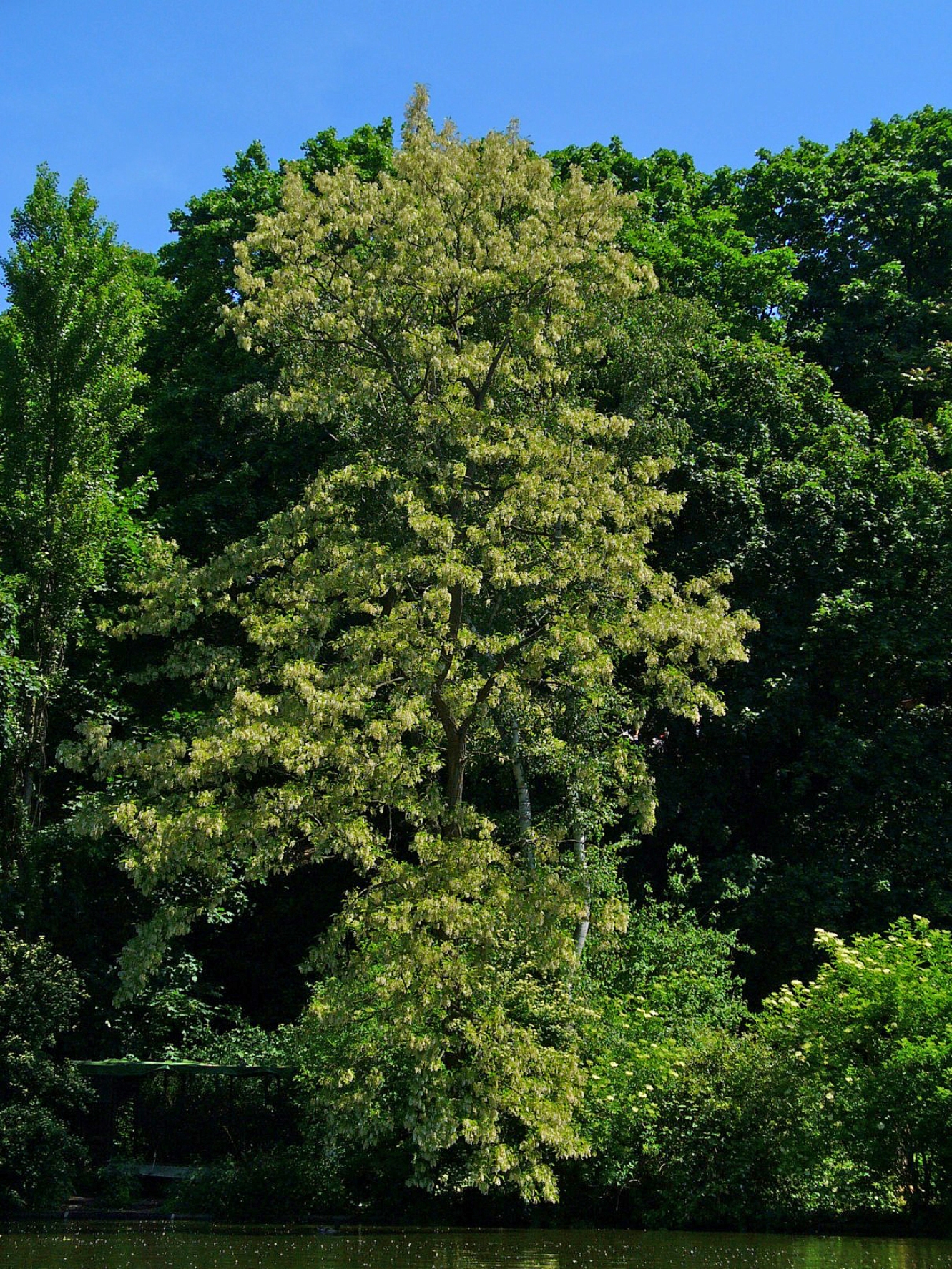
Black locust.

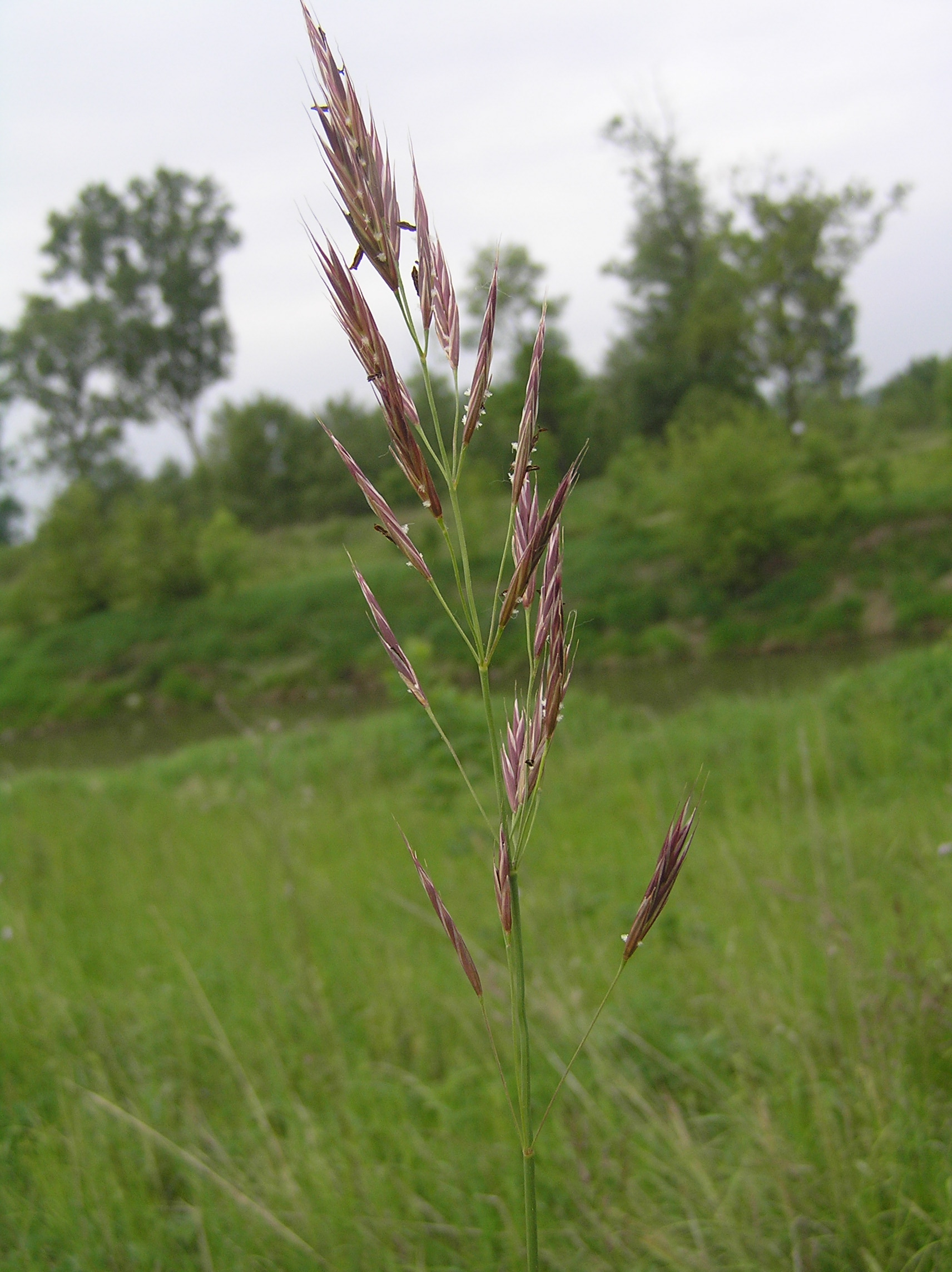
Erect brome.

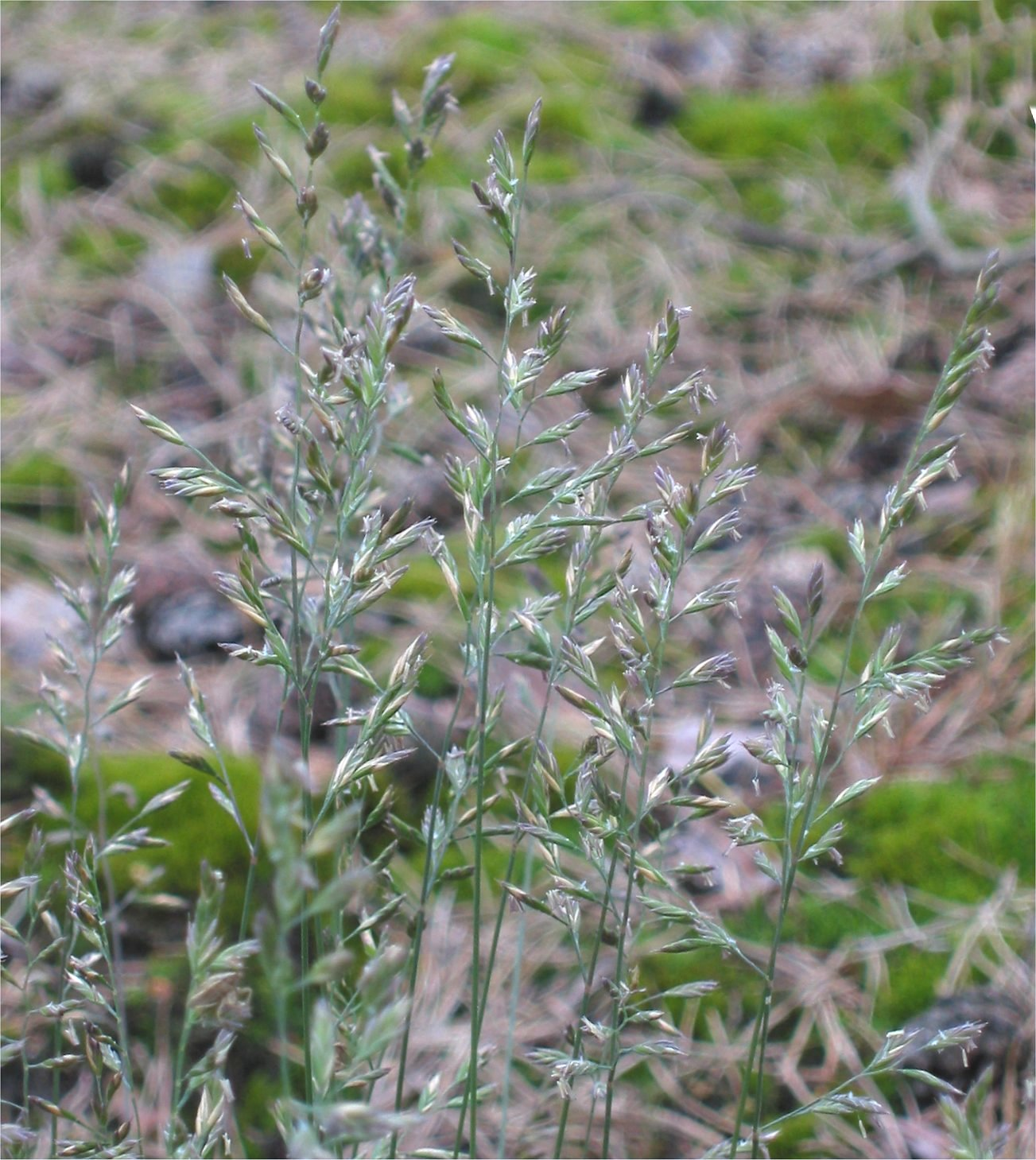
Sheep fescue.

Some species belonging to the genus Orchis (Note: Some species have been reclassified into different genera. See Orchis.) can be observed in this area, including the lady orchid (Orchis purpurea), the fragant orchid (Gymnadenia conopsea), the military orchid (Orchis militaris), which is particularly scarce, and the pyramidal orchid (Anacamptis pyramidalis). Additionally, the following species are present: the pyramidal orchid (Anacamptis pyramidalis), the lizard orchid (Himantoglossum hircinum), which is characterized by a fetid odor, the green-winged orchid (Anacamptis morio, syn. Orchis morio), and the monkey orchid (Orchis simia).

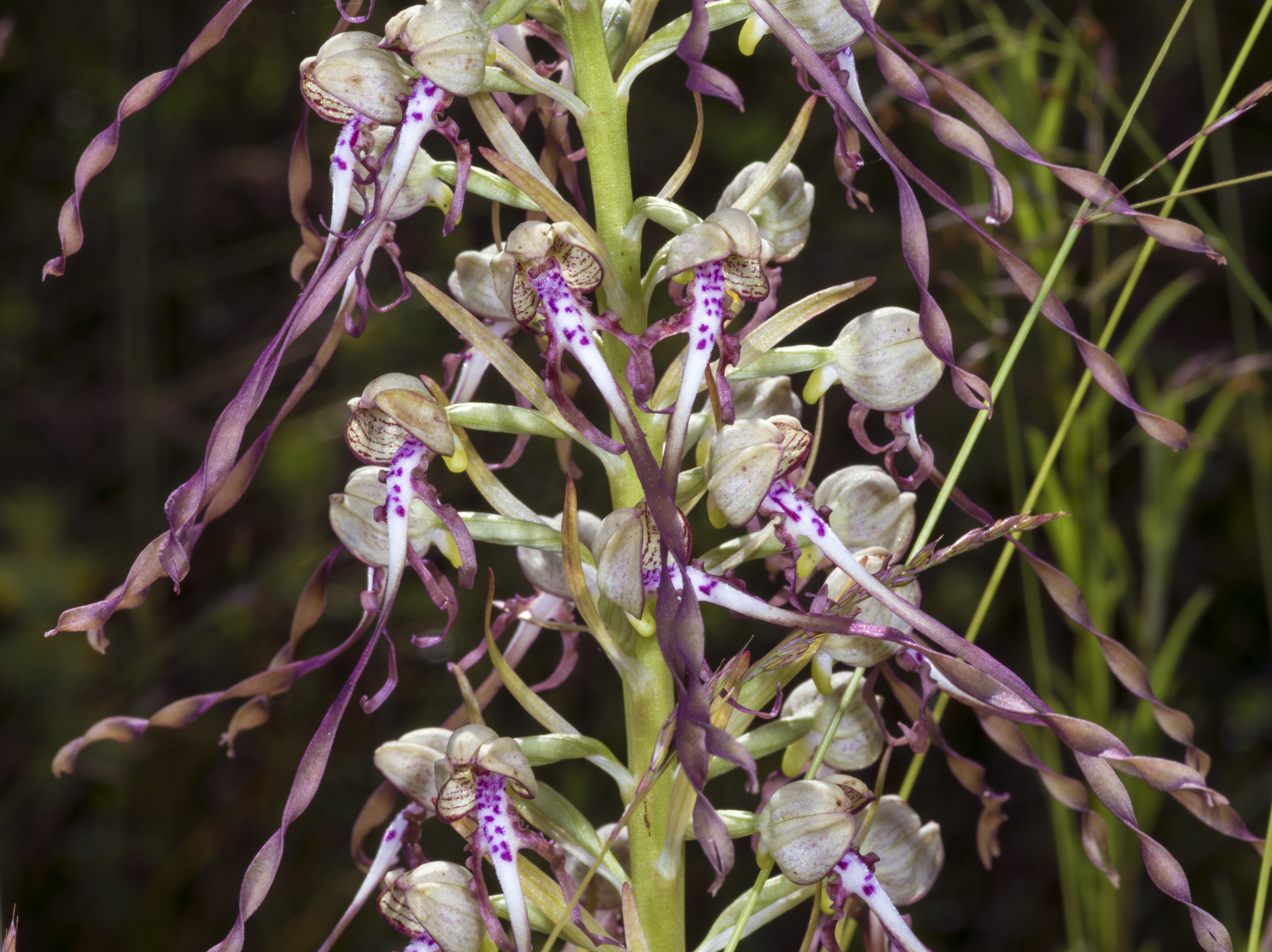
Lizard orchid.

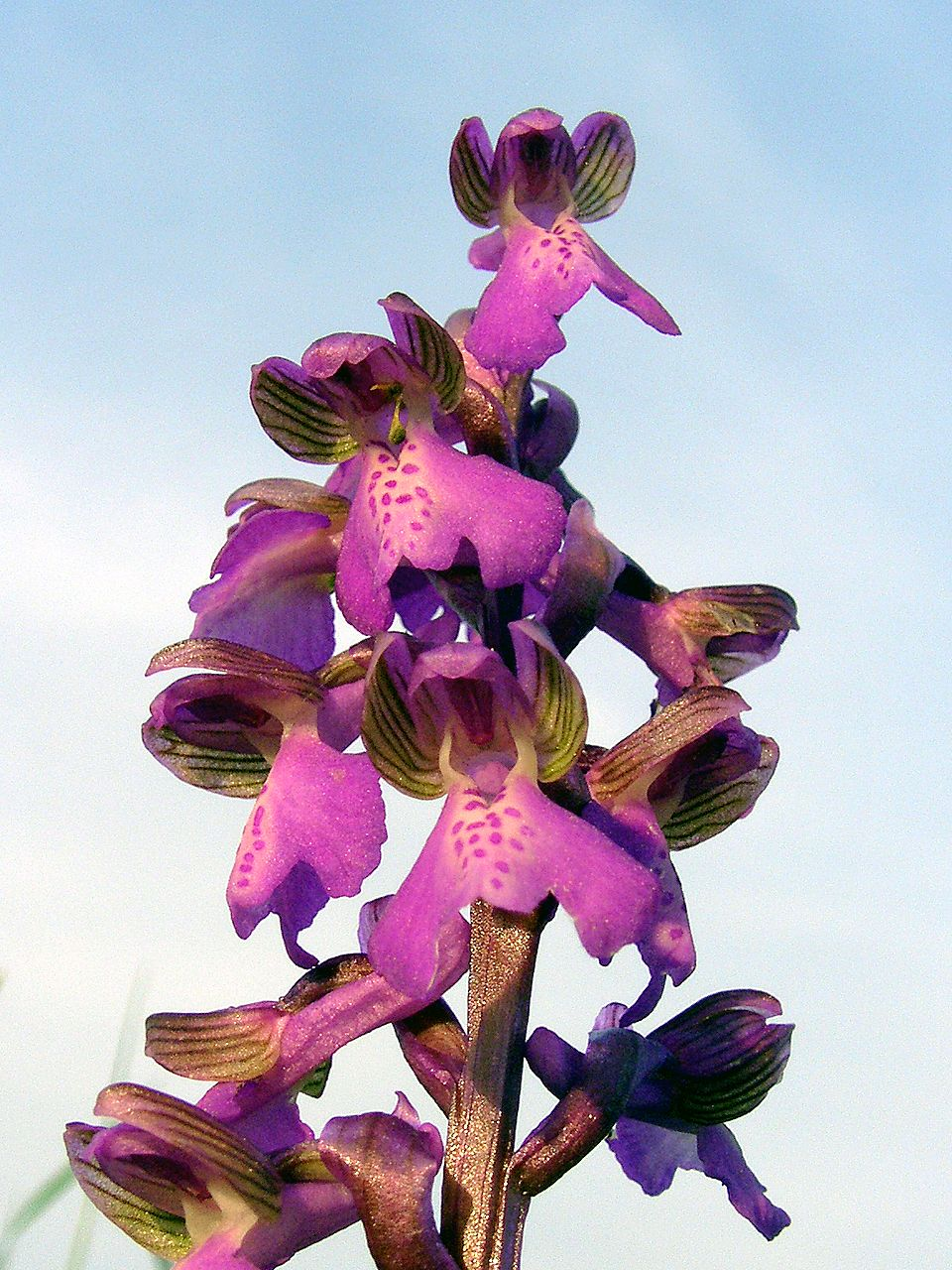
Green-winged orchid.

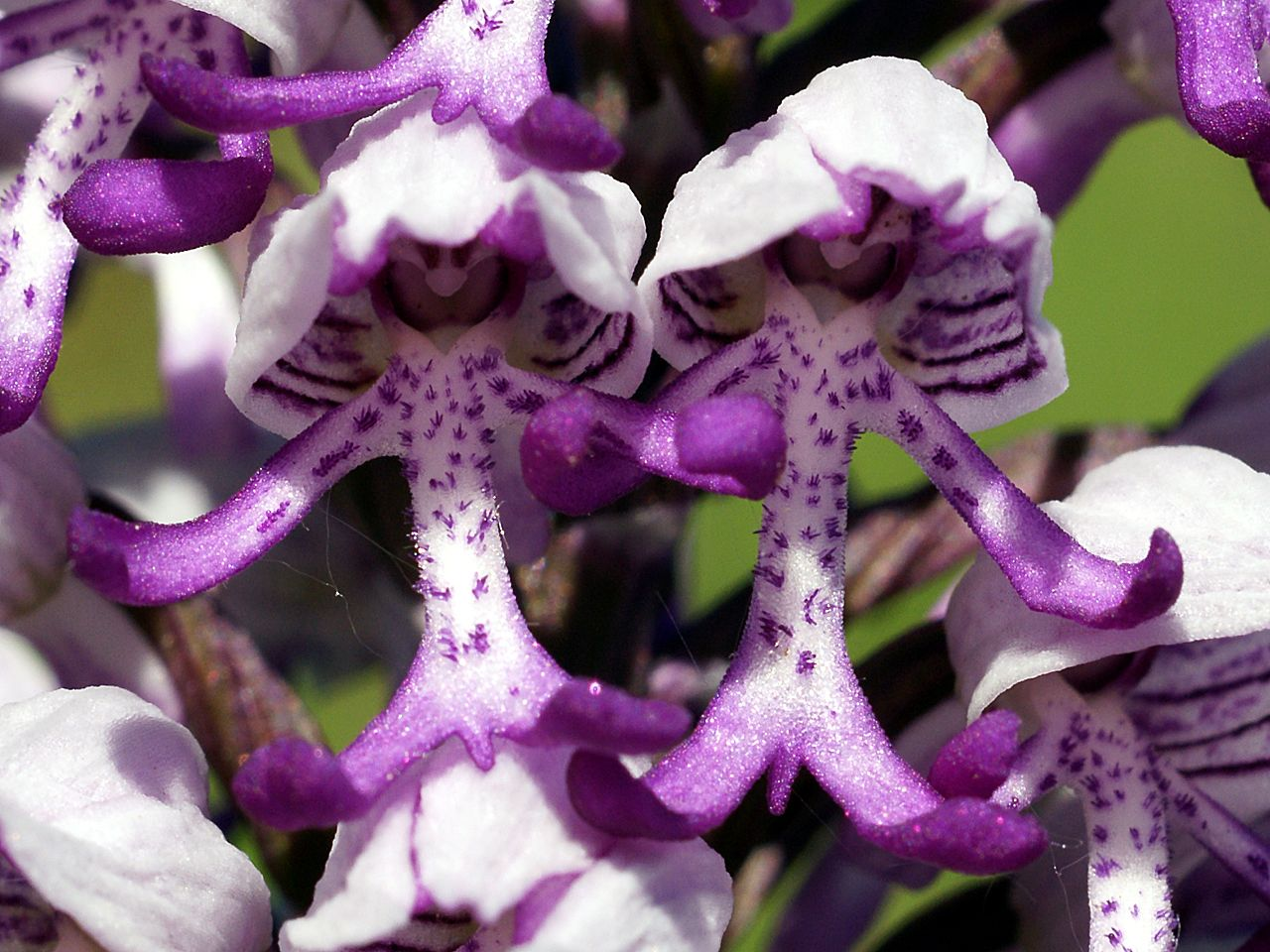
Military orchid.

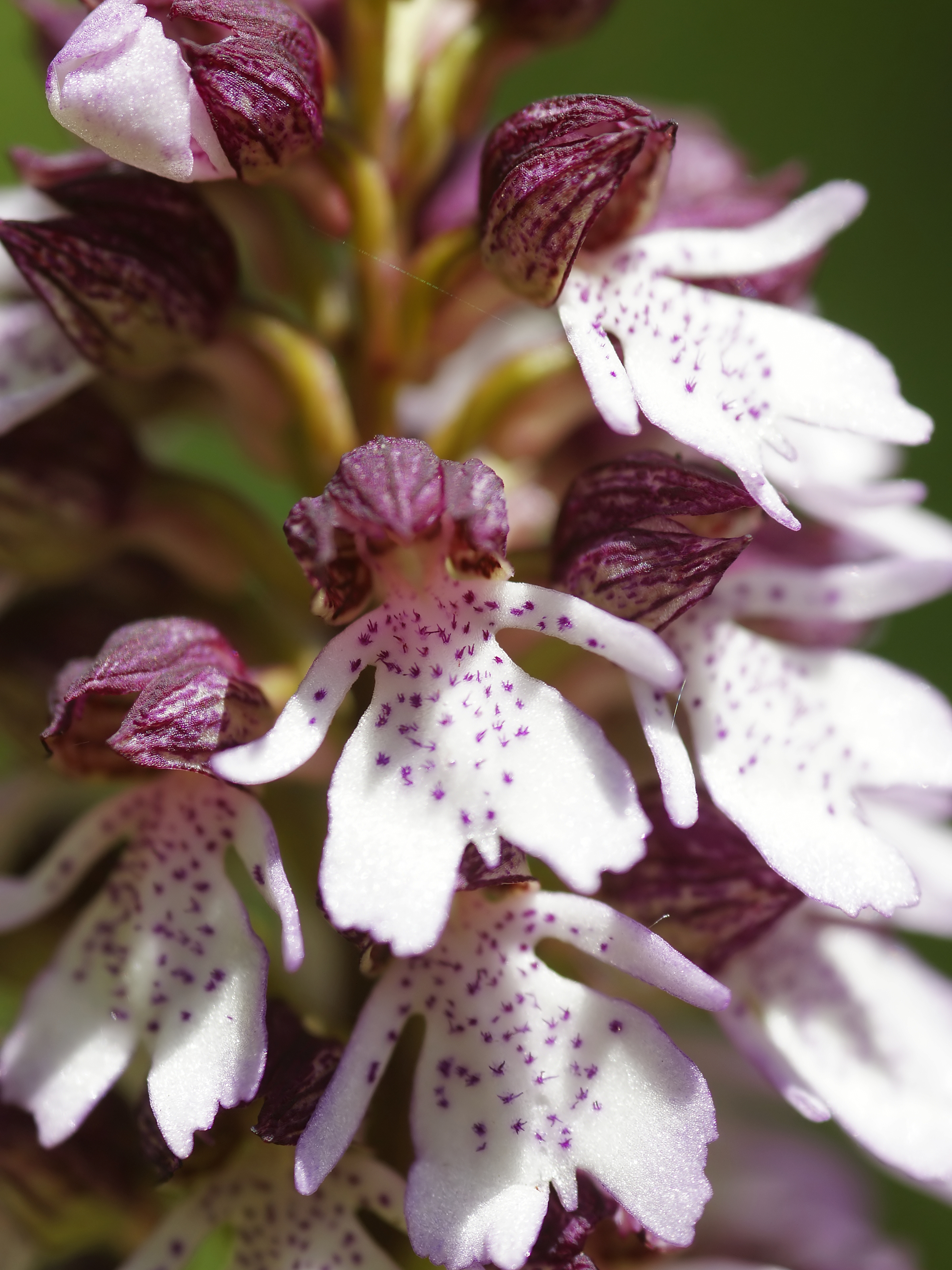
Lady orchid.

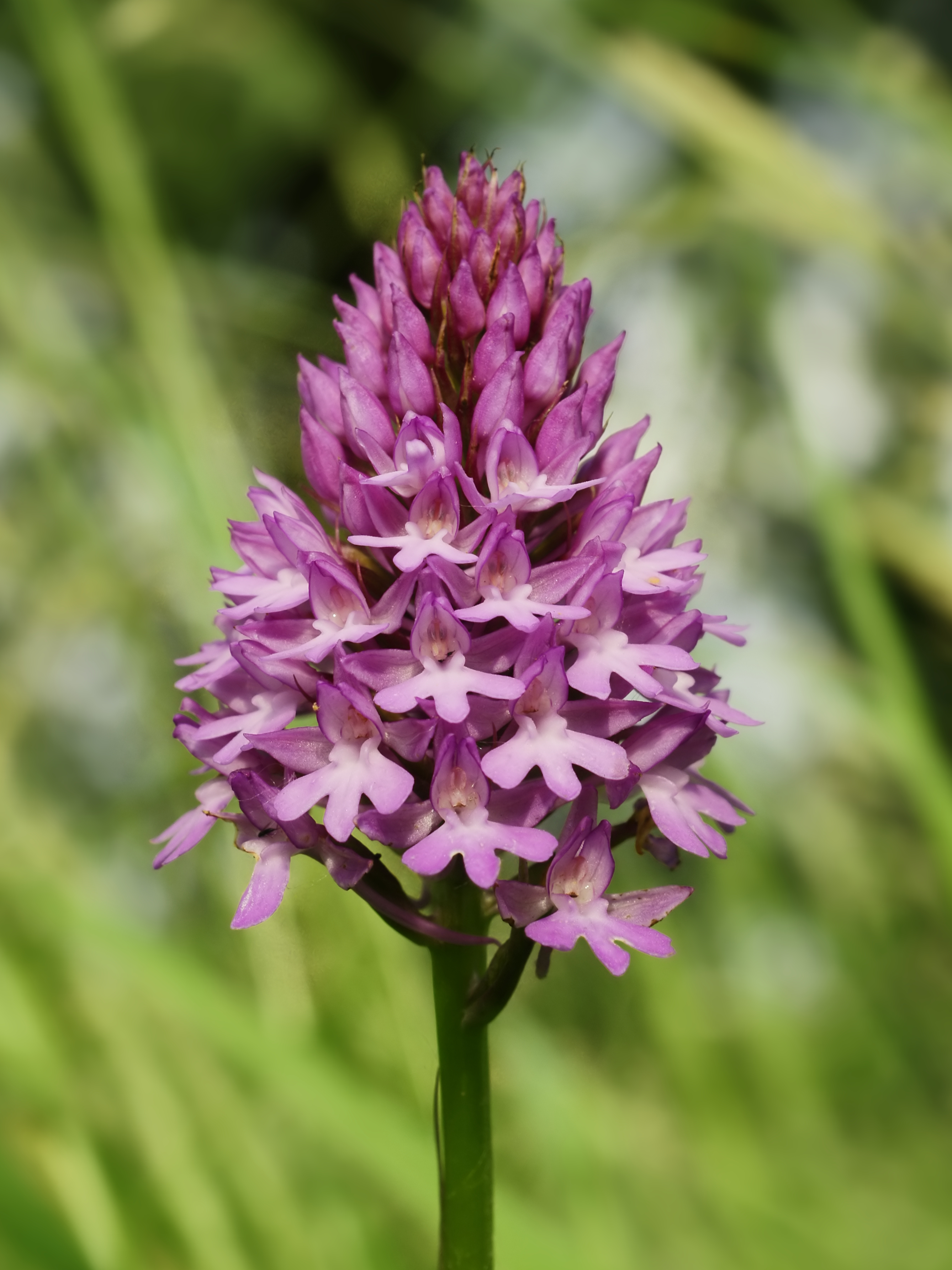
Pyramidal orchid.

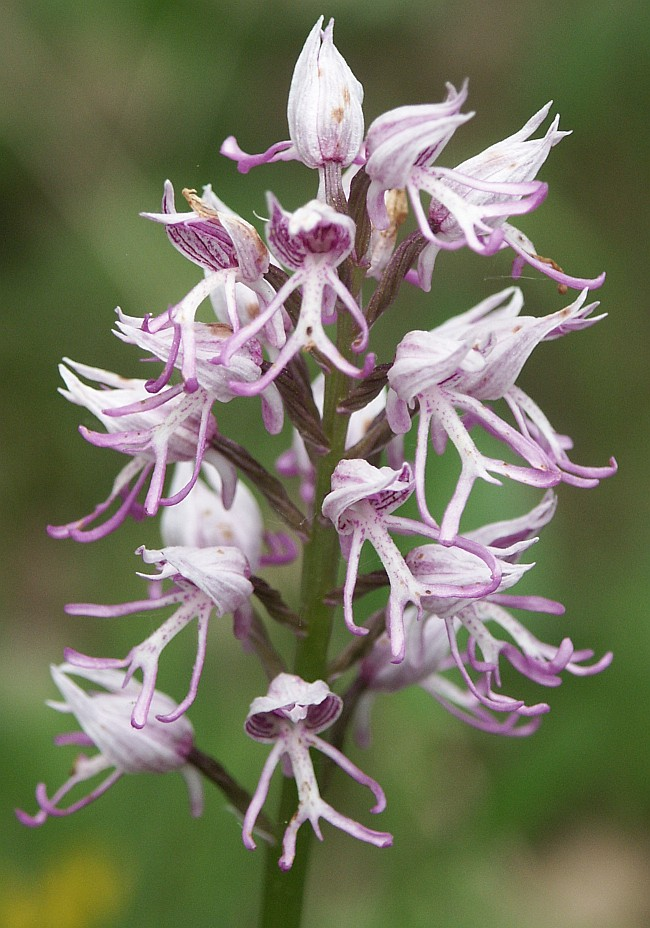
Monkey orchid.

Additionally, the genus Ophrys of orchids features flowers that imitate the shape and scent of female insects, utilizing sexual pheromones to attract males of the corresponding insect species, thereby facilitating pollination. The bee orchid (Ophrys apifera) is a notable example. The fly orchid (Ophrys insectifera), the small spider orchid (Ophrys araneola), the early spider orchid (Ophrys sphegodes), and the late spider orchid (Ophrys fuciflora) are the most widely distributed.

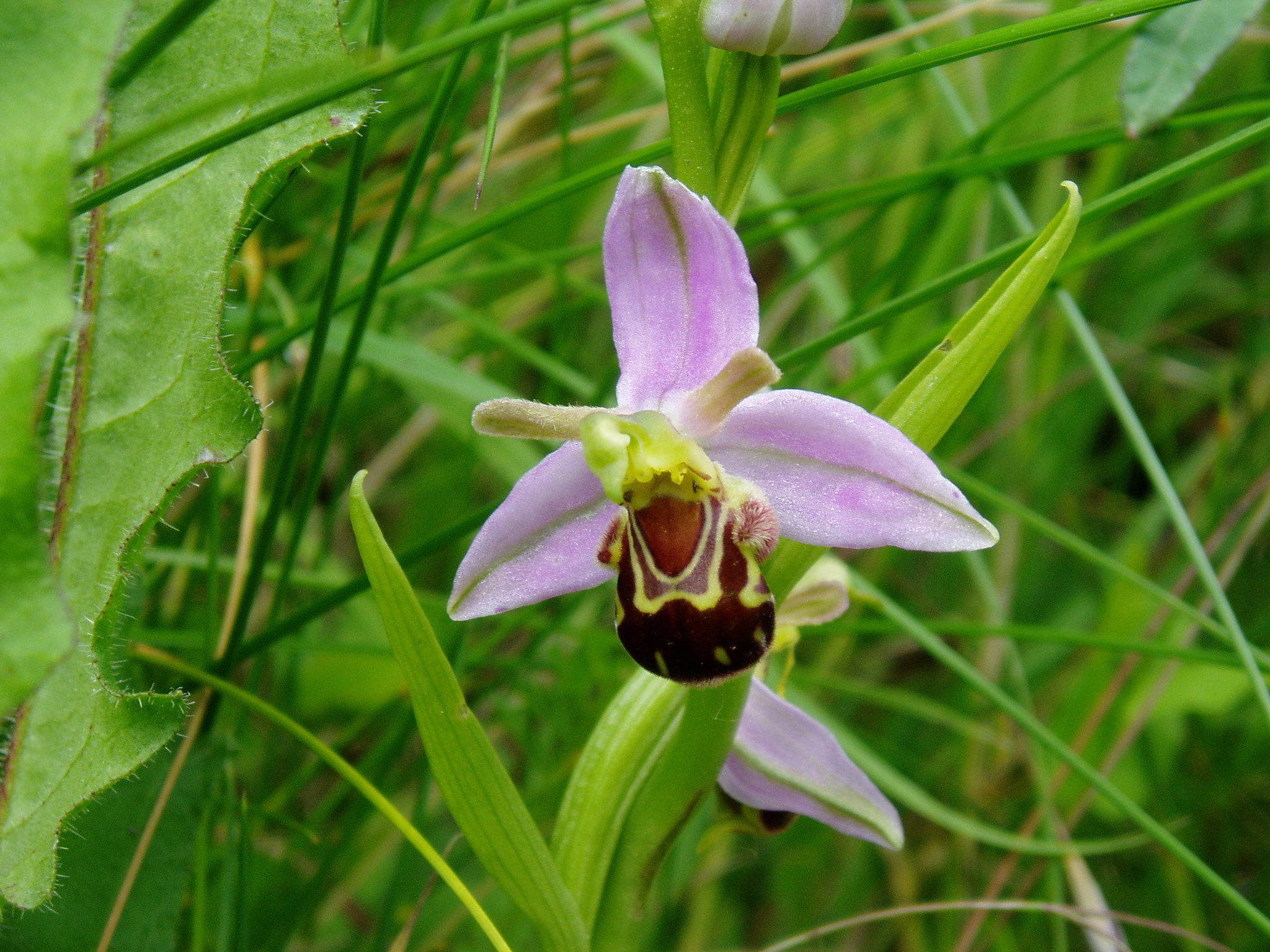
Bee orchid.

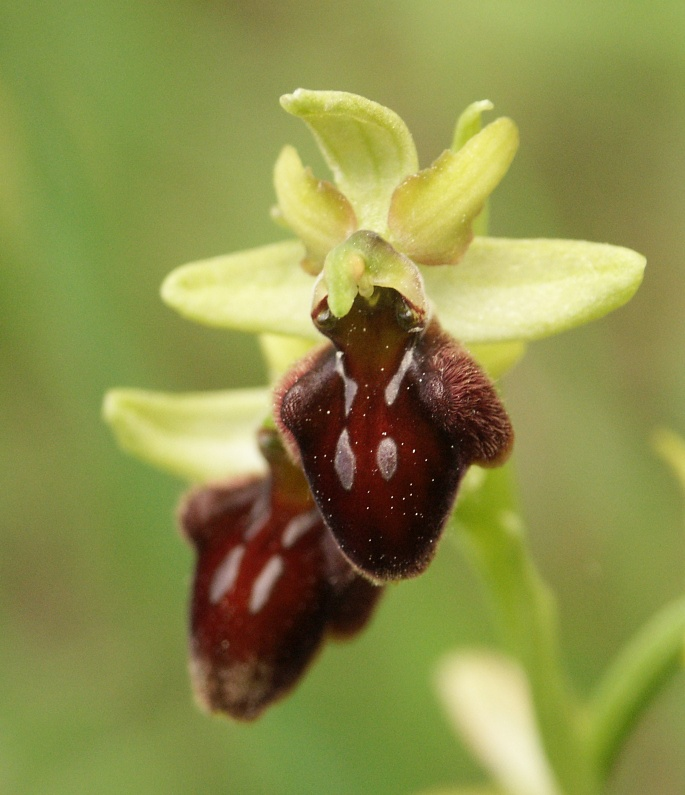
Early spider-orchid.

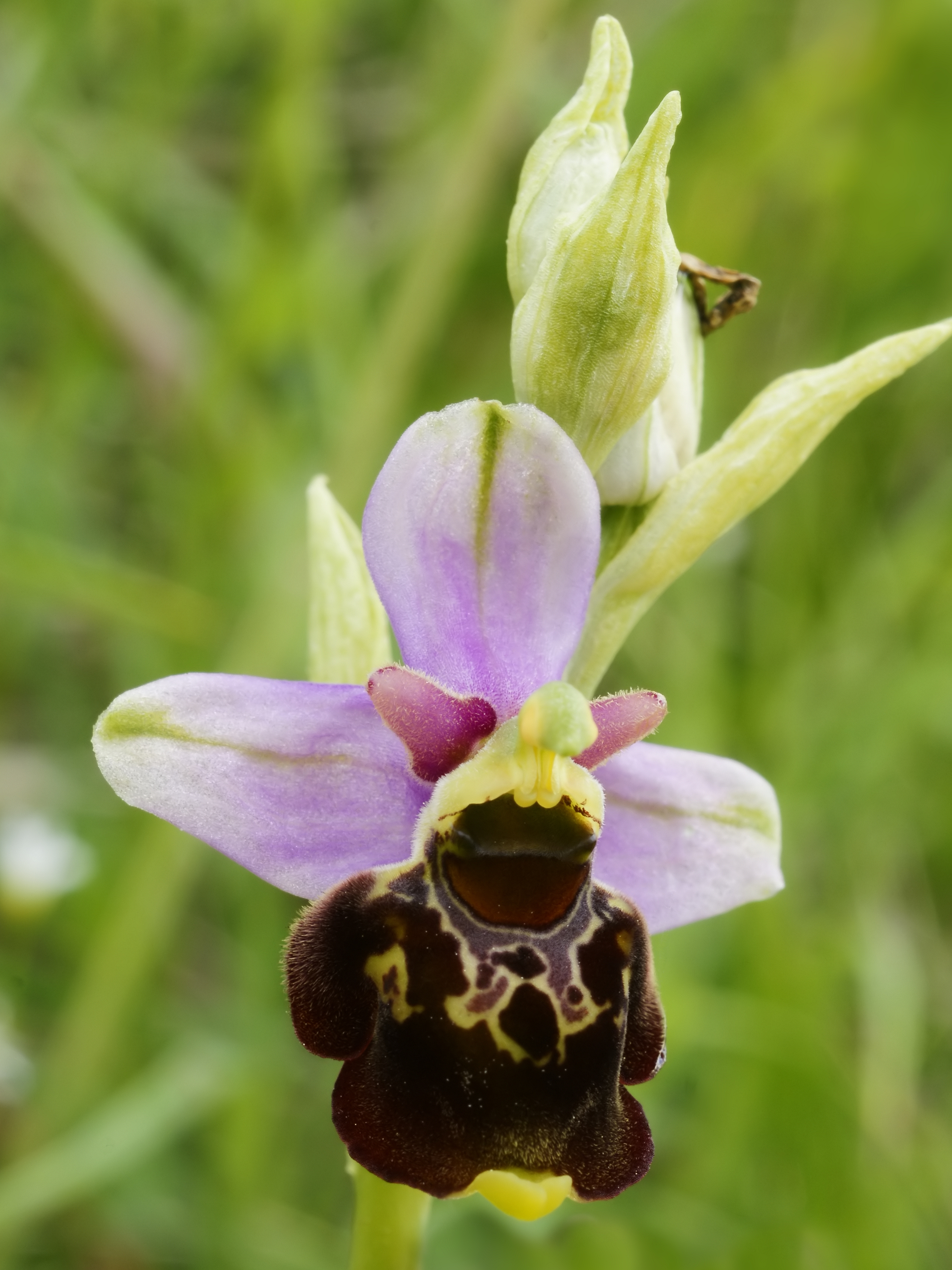
Late spider orchid.

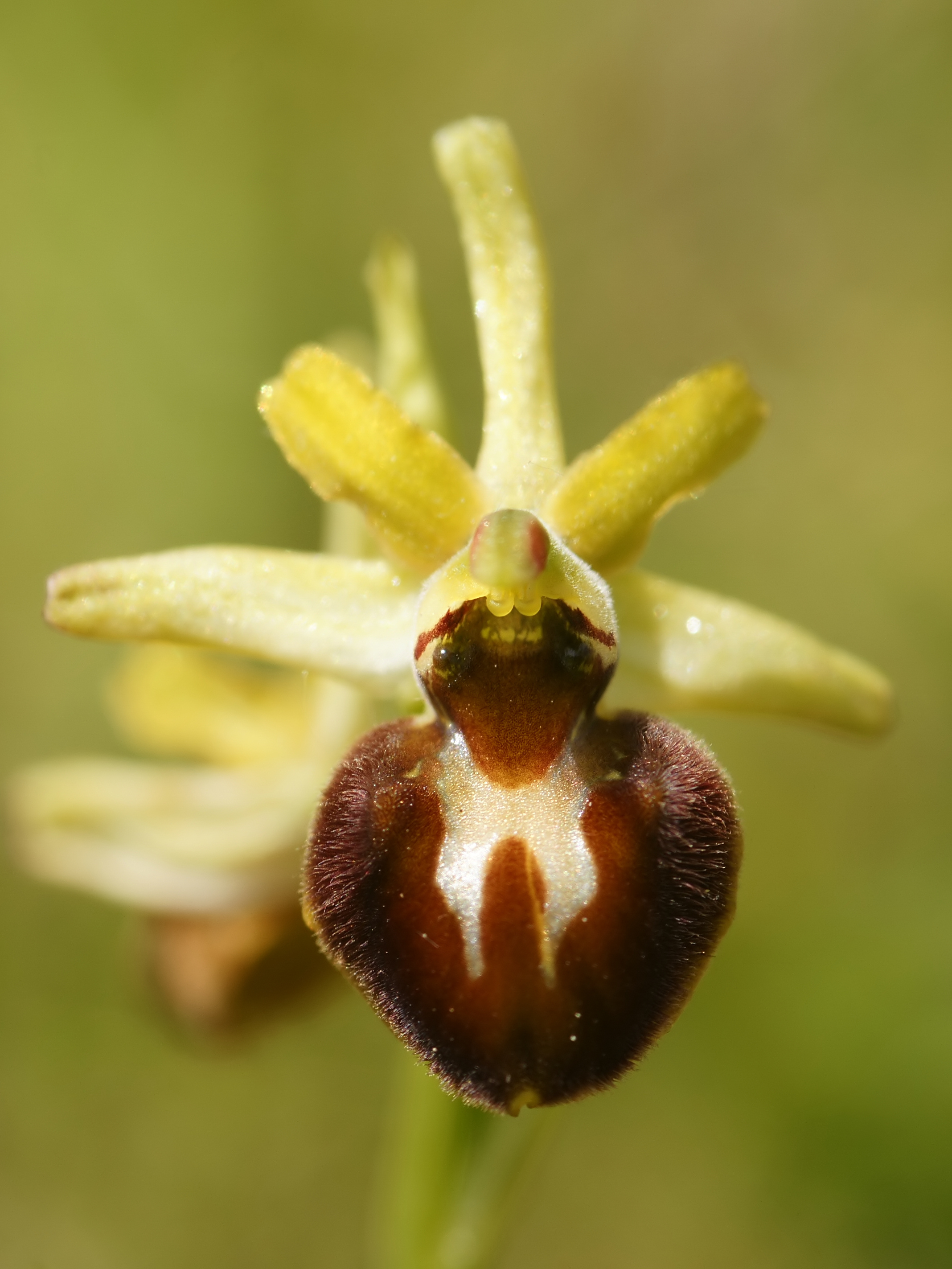
Ophrys litigious.

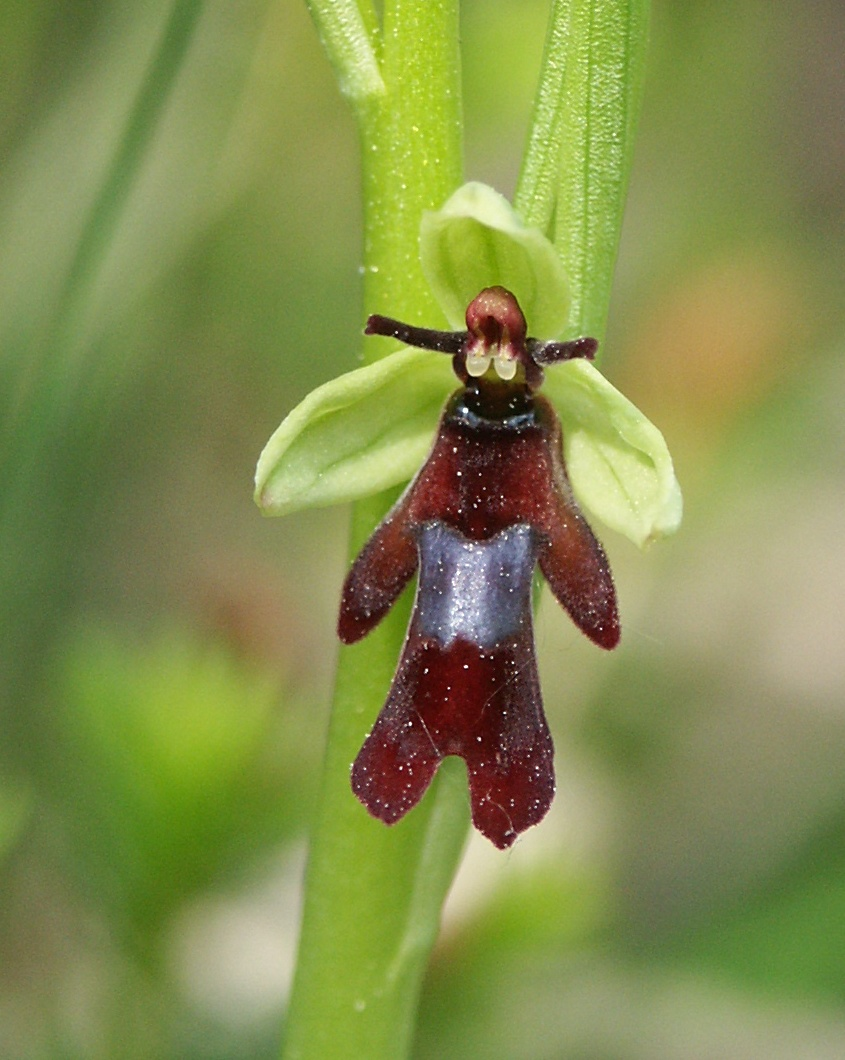
Fly orchid.

Additionally, other species of flowers, including the Carthusian pink (Dianthus carthusianorum), the pasqueflower (Pulsatilla vulgaris), the fumewort (Corydalis solida), and the two-leaf squill (Scilla bifolia), can be observed in the area.

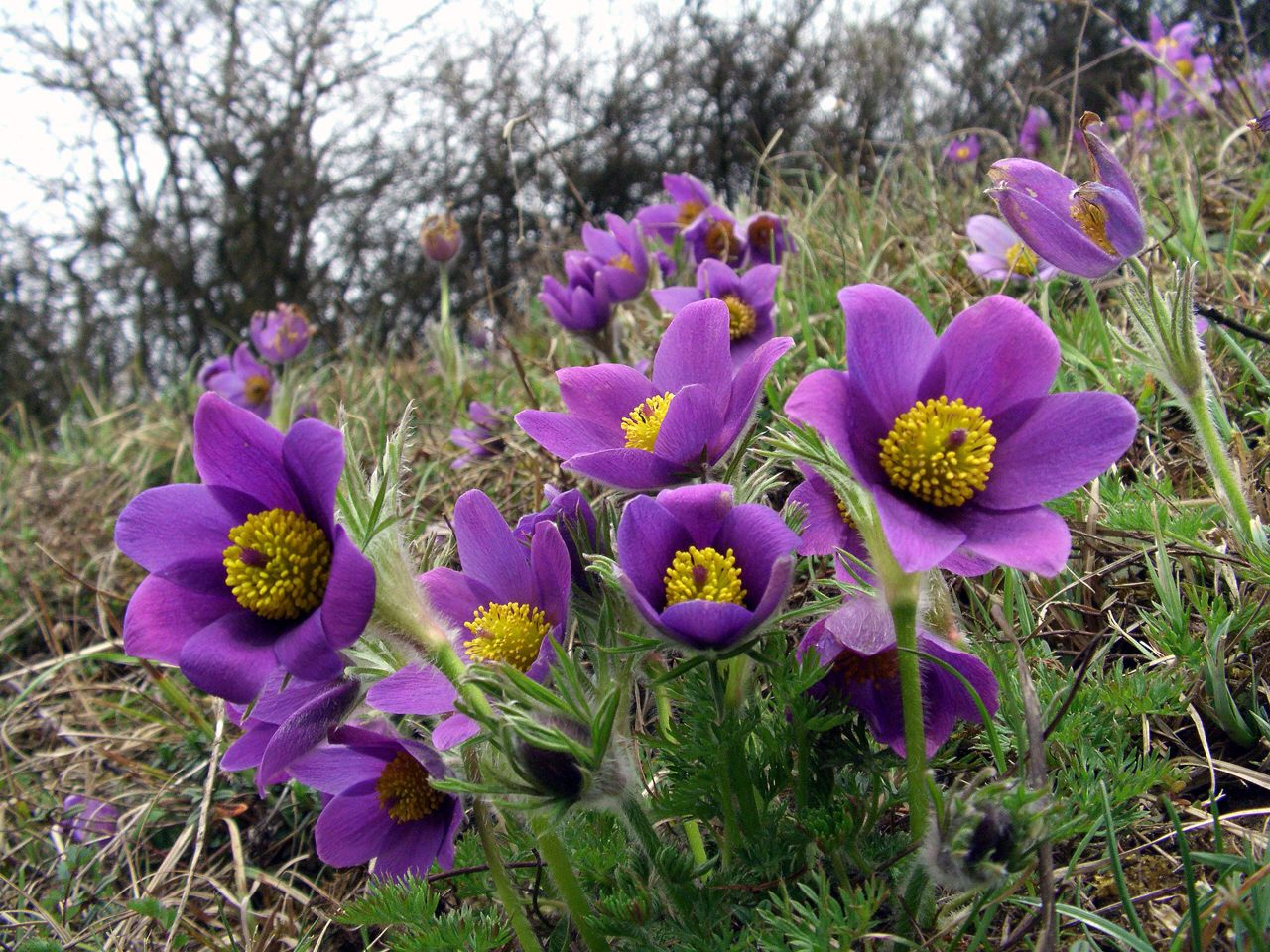
Anemone pulsatilla.

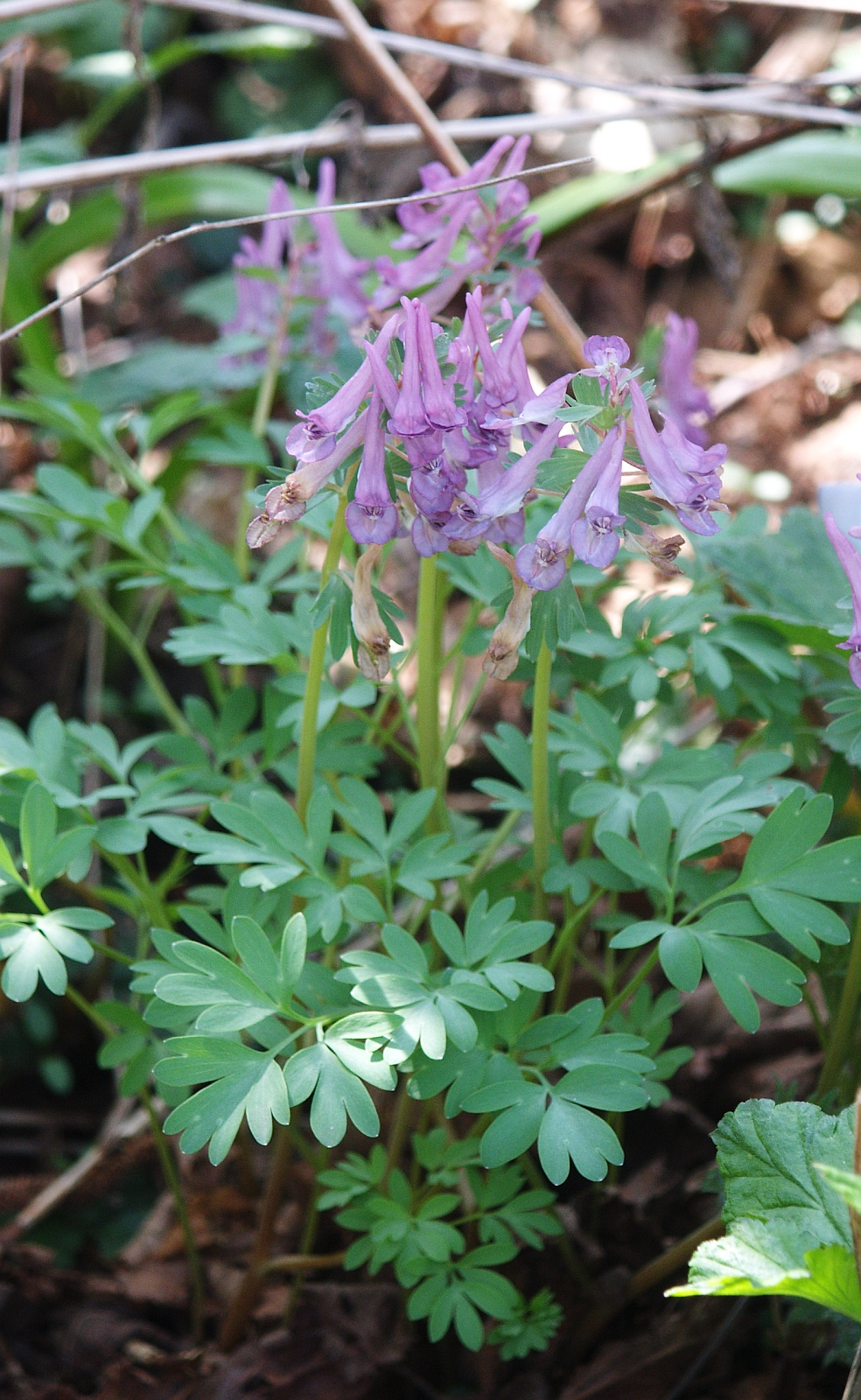
Fumewort.

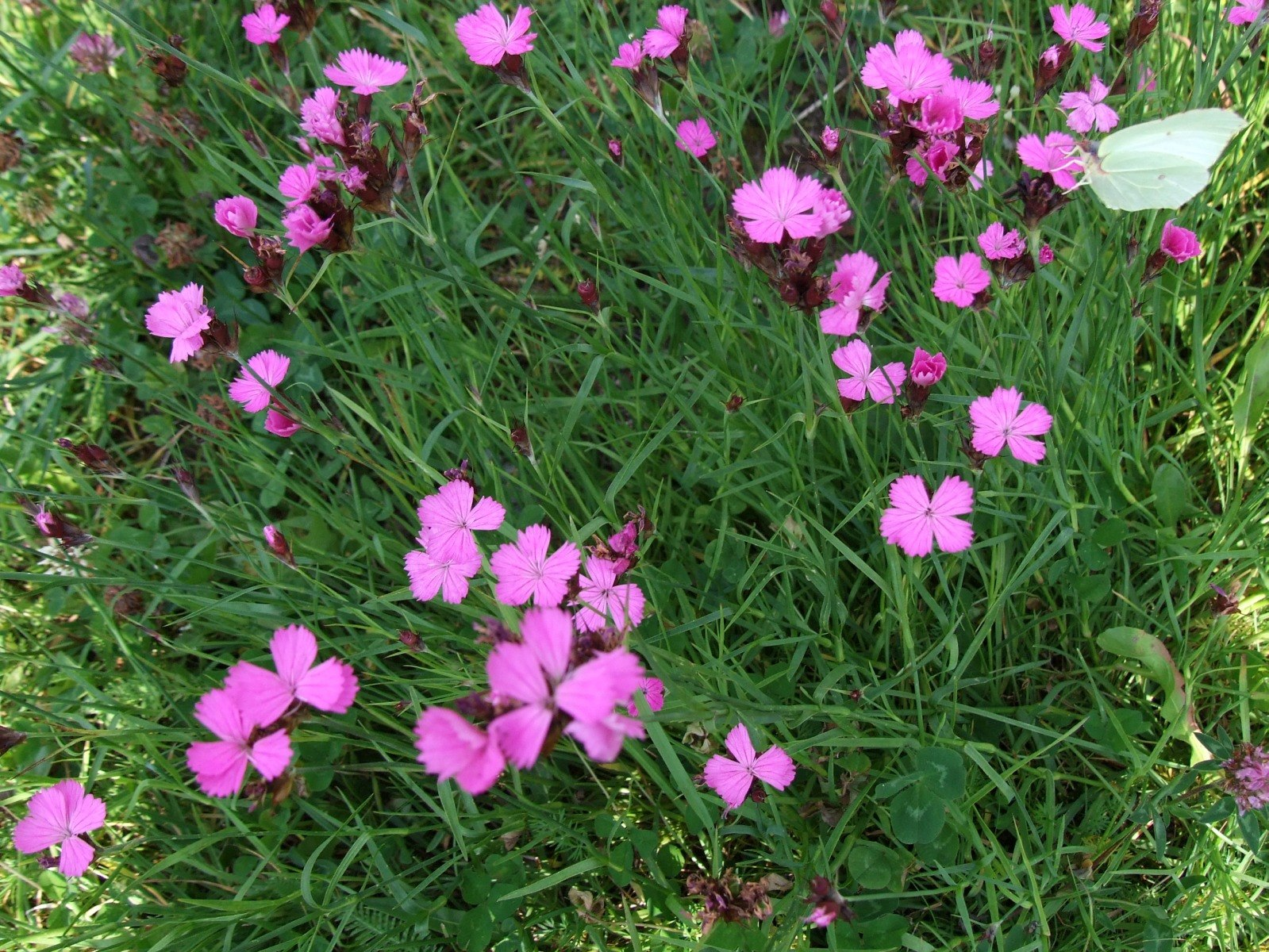
Carthusian pink.

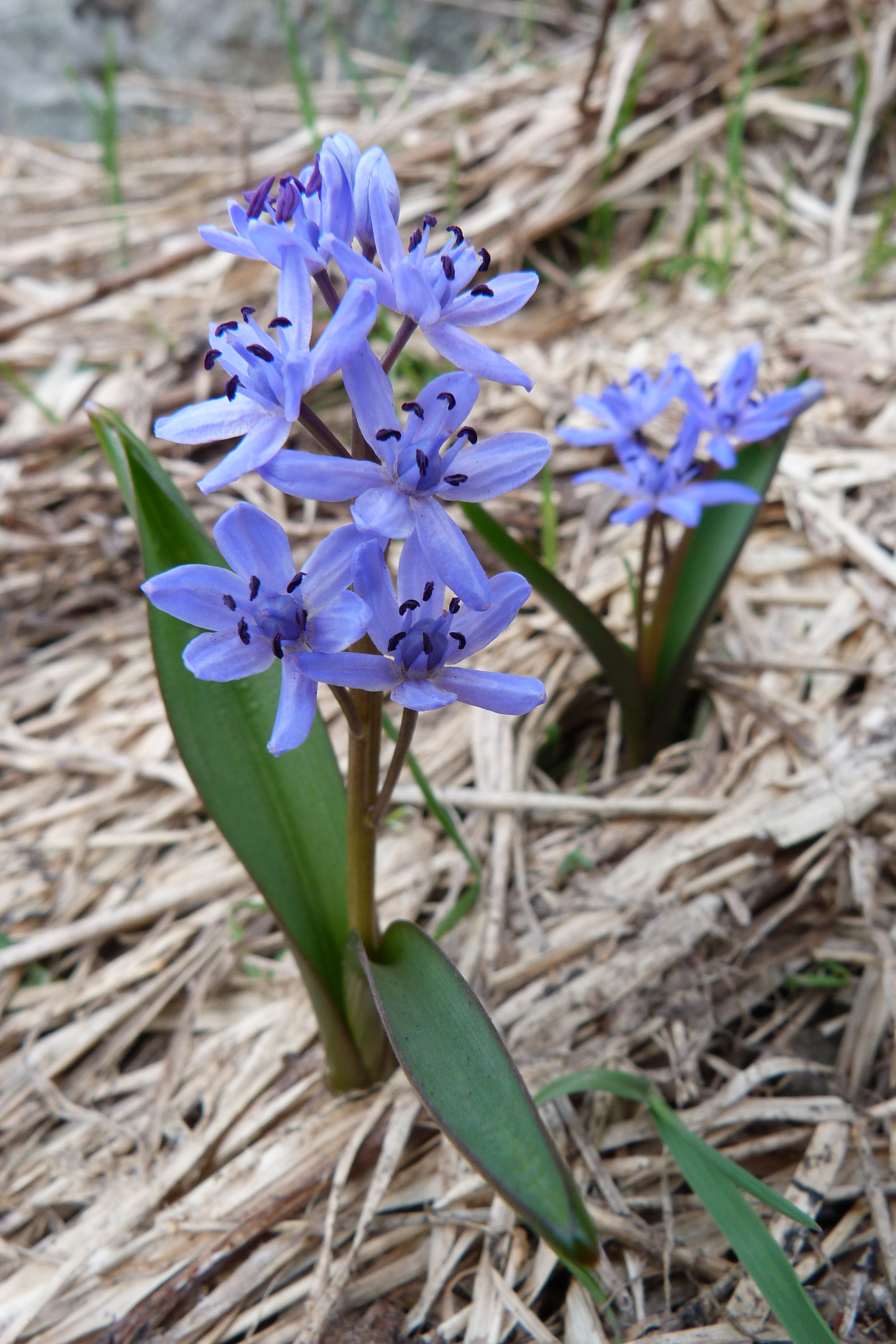
Two-leaf squill near the Batteriekopf.

=== Flora of the mountain zone ===
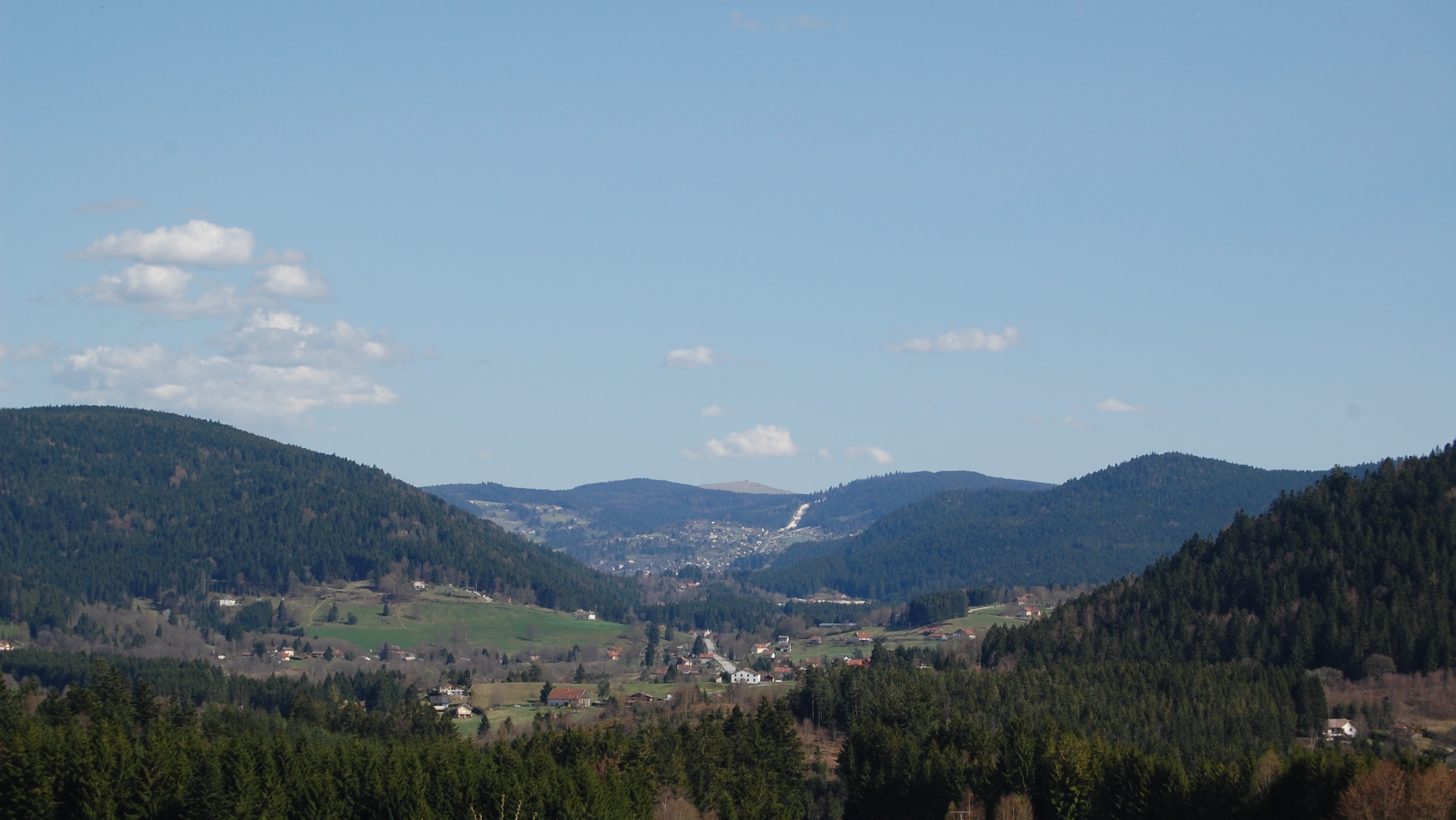
View of Gérardmer and the Hohneck (background) from Le Tholy, illustrating three types of vegetation found in the montane and subalpine zone: forest, meadow and high thatch.

The natural vegetation of the mountain zone is the beech-fir forest. In the absence of human intervention, the forest would occupy the entire mountainscape, except for the highest peaks and those most exposed to the elements, which constitute the subalpine zone. The formation of open spaces, such as meadows, can be attributed to human activities related to agriculture and livestock farming. The only naturally occurring open spaces are the high moors, which have been subject to human manipulation through the clearing of stunted vegetation. These high-altitude meadows are home to plant species that have adapted to the harsh conditions characteristic of the region.

Other forest stands are indicative of particular ecological conditions, including alder groves, alder-ash groves, and ash-maple groves in valley areas, sugar bush on screes, spruce groves in glacial cirques and bogs, and birch groves in open areas.

==== Beech-Fir forest ====
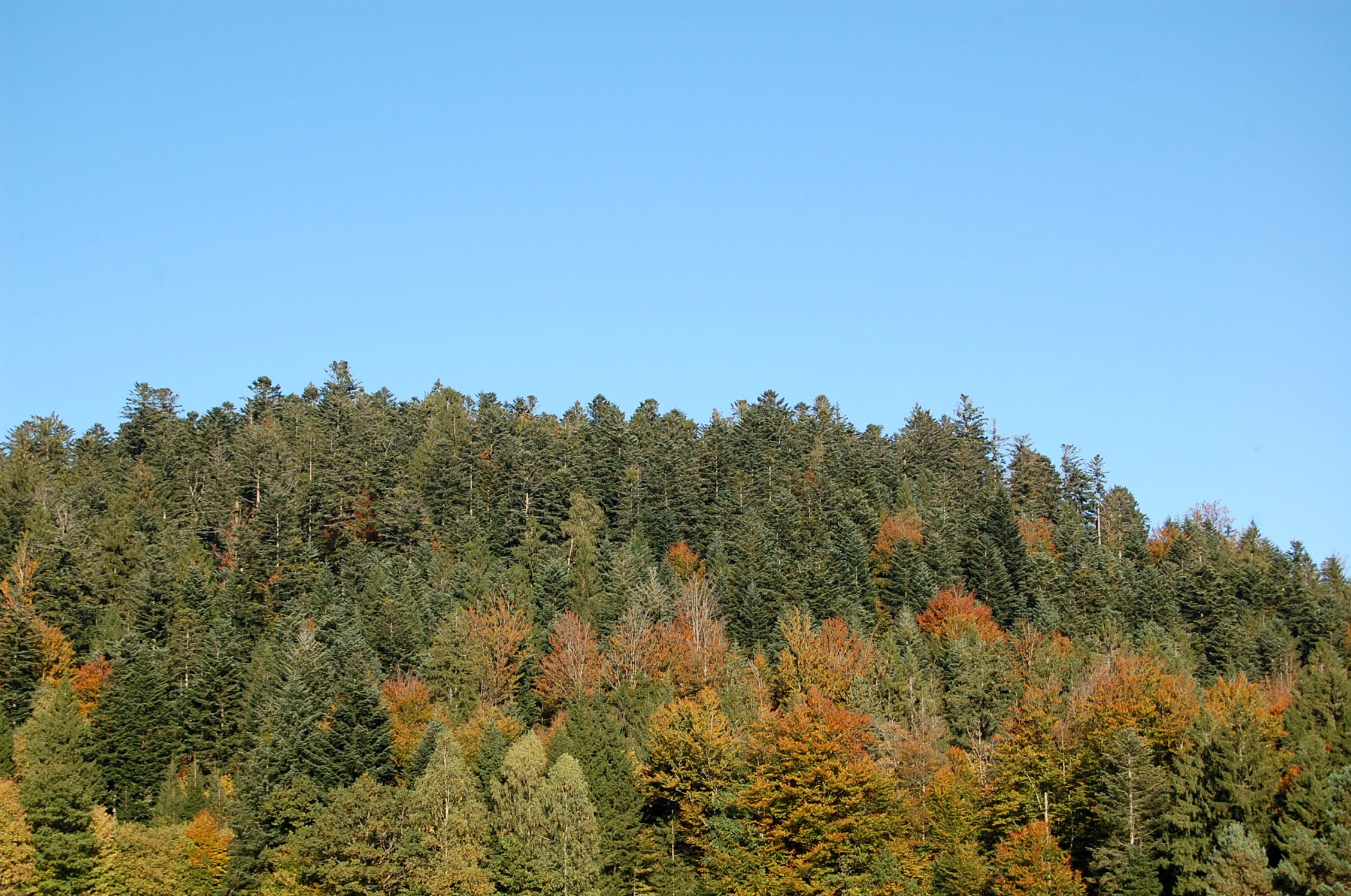
Beech-fir forest in autumn. The firs remain green while the beech foliage takes on orange hues. Le Tholy.

As its name indicates, the beech-fir forest is predominantly composed of beeches (Fagus sylvatica) and firs (Abies alba). The silver fir or white fir (Abies alba) is the emblematic tree of the High Vosges; it is sometimes referred to as the Vosges fir. The prevalence of either the fir or the beech is contingent upon many factors, including altitude, soil composition, and humidity. Additionally, human forest management practices often exert a significant influence on the composition of these forests. Other tree species, primarily spruce (Picea abies) and Scots pine (Pinus sylvestris), can also be found in these ecosystems. At elevations exceeding approximately 1,000 meters, the firs give way to beeches and sycamore maples.

Spruce trees are outcompeted by firs and beech trees; they only replace them in a few natural spruce groves on the rocky walls of cold slopes. Their prevalence in other regions is attributable to human-induced plantations. Following the rural exodus of the 1960s, many meadow plots were planted with spruce, which led to the near-total closure of some valleys. However, these plantations do not constitute a "true" forest capable of regenerating; they consist of densely planted spruce that exhaust the soil. Furthermore, the lack of light in these artificial spruce groves and the acidic needle litter prevent the development of other plant species in the undergrowth.

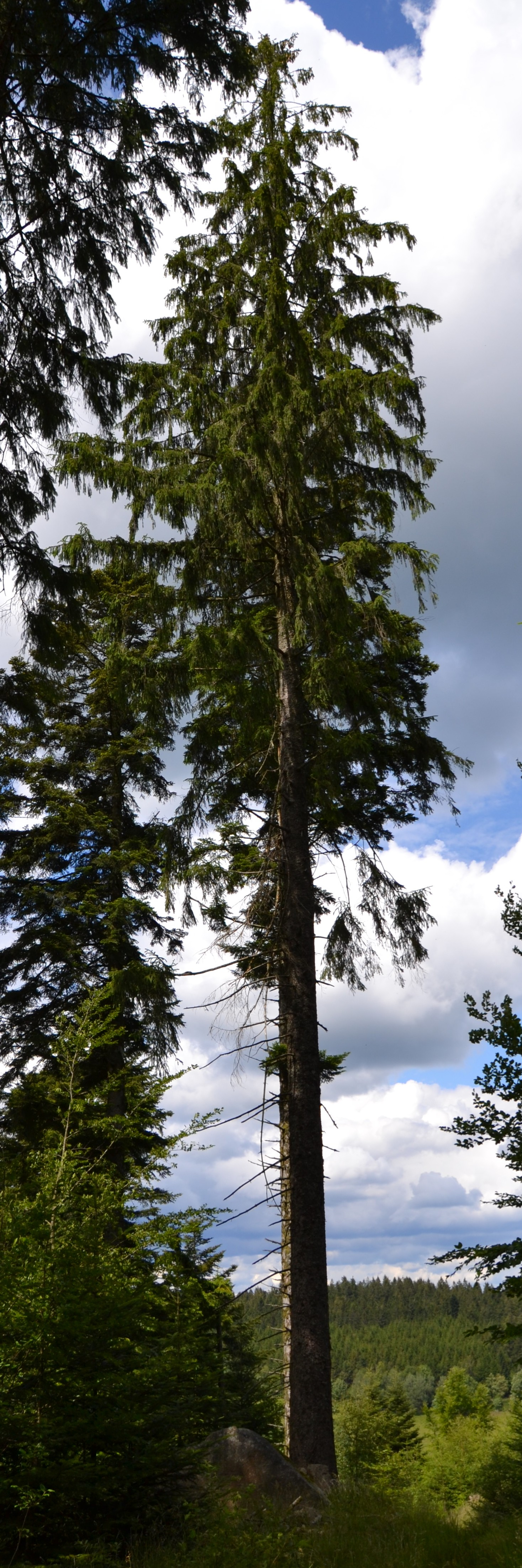
Spruce, Le Tholy.

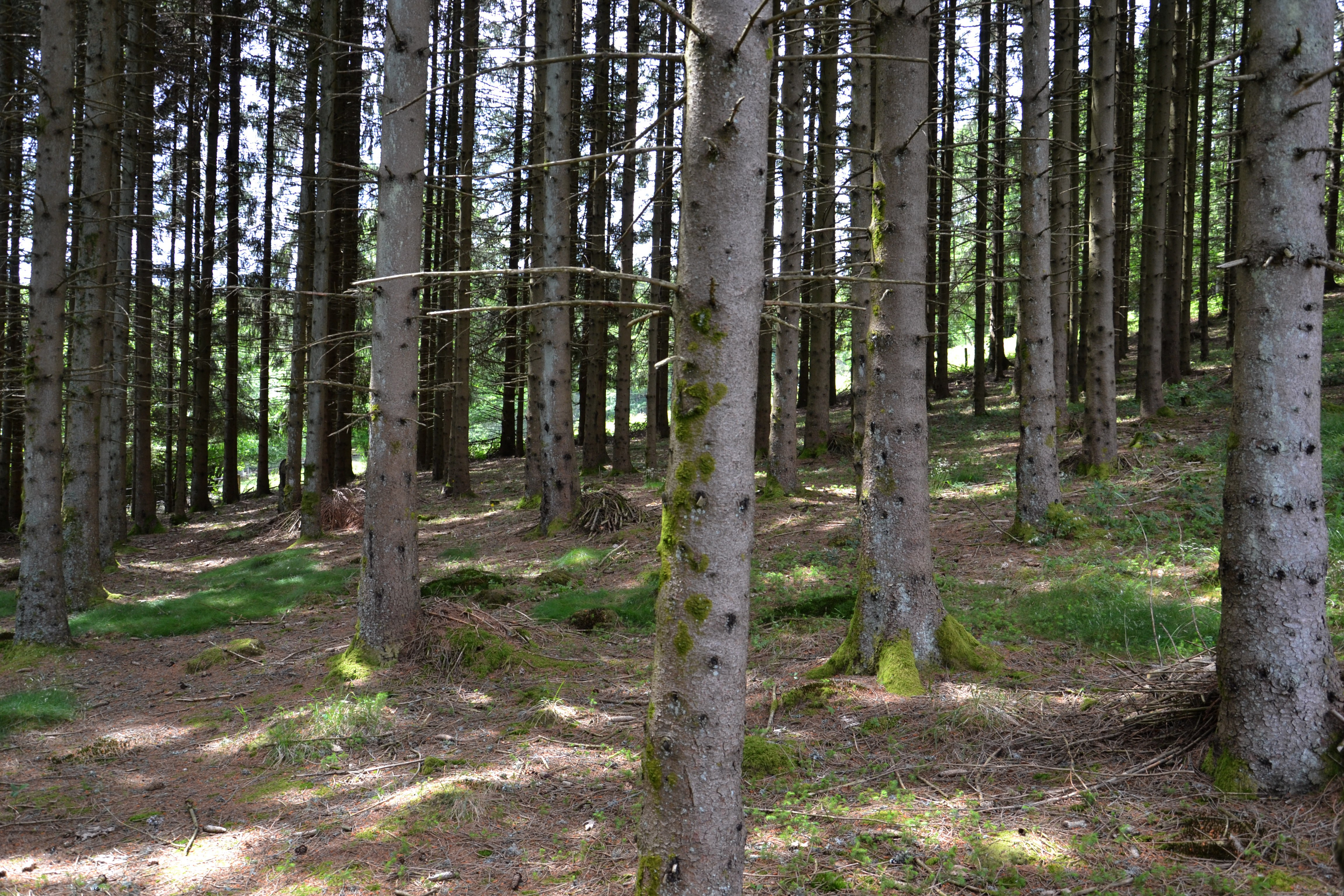
Spruce wood in tight rows, Le Tholy.

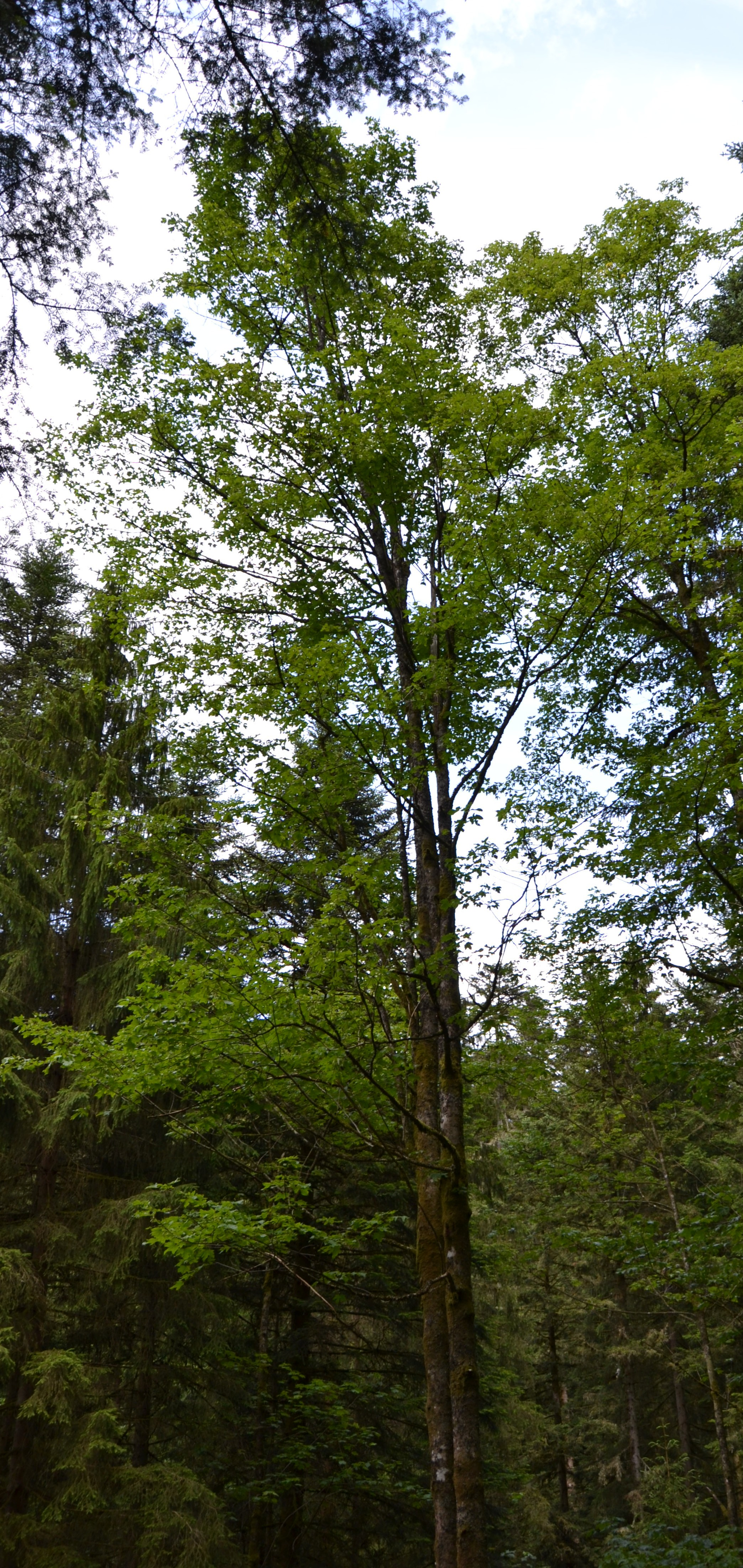
Sycamore maple, Le Tholy.

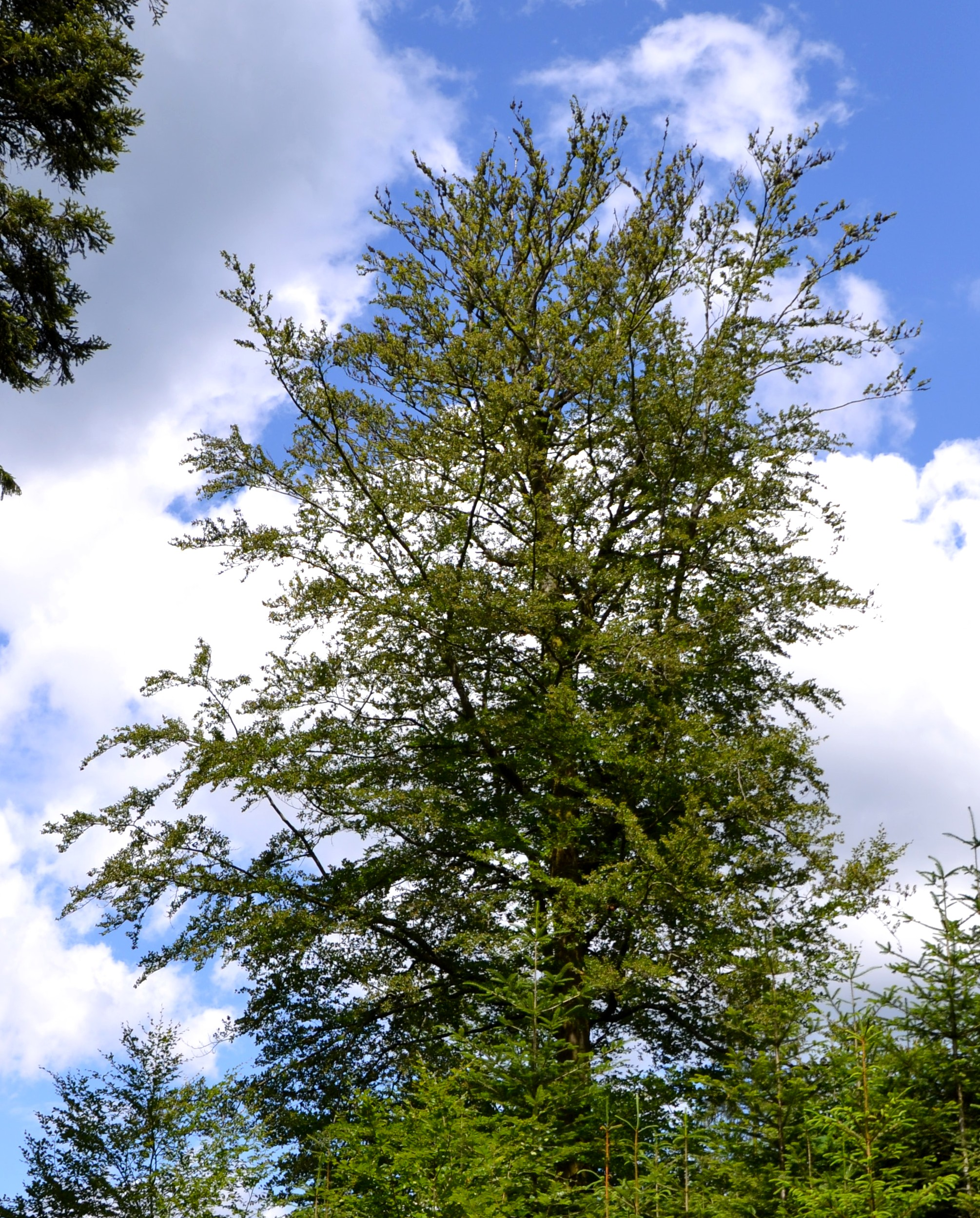
Beech, Le Tholy.

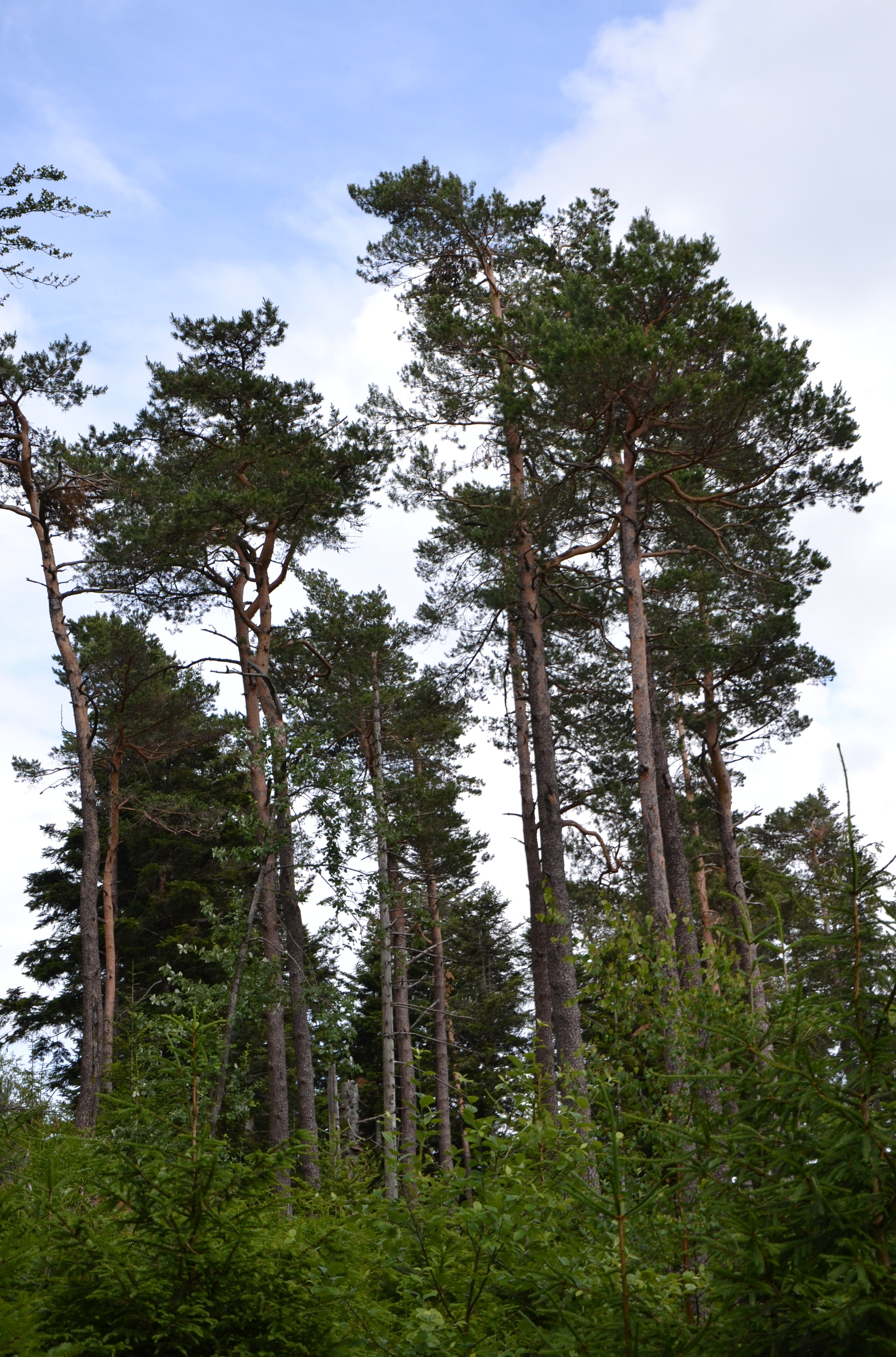
Scots pine, Le Tholy.

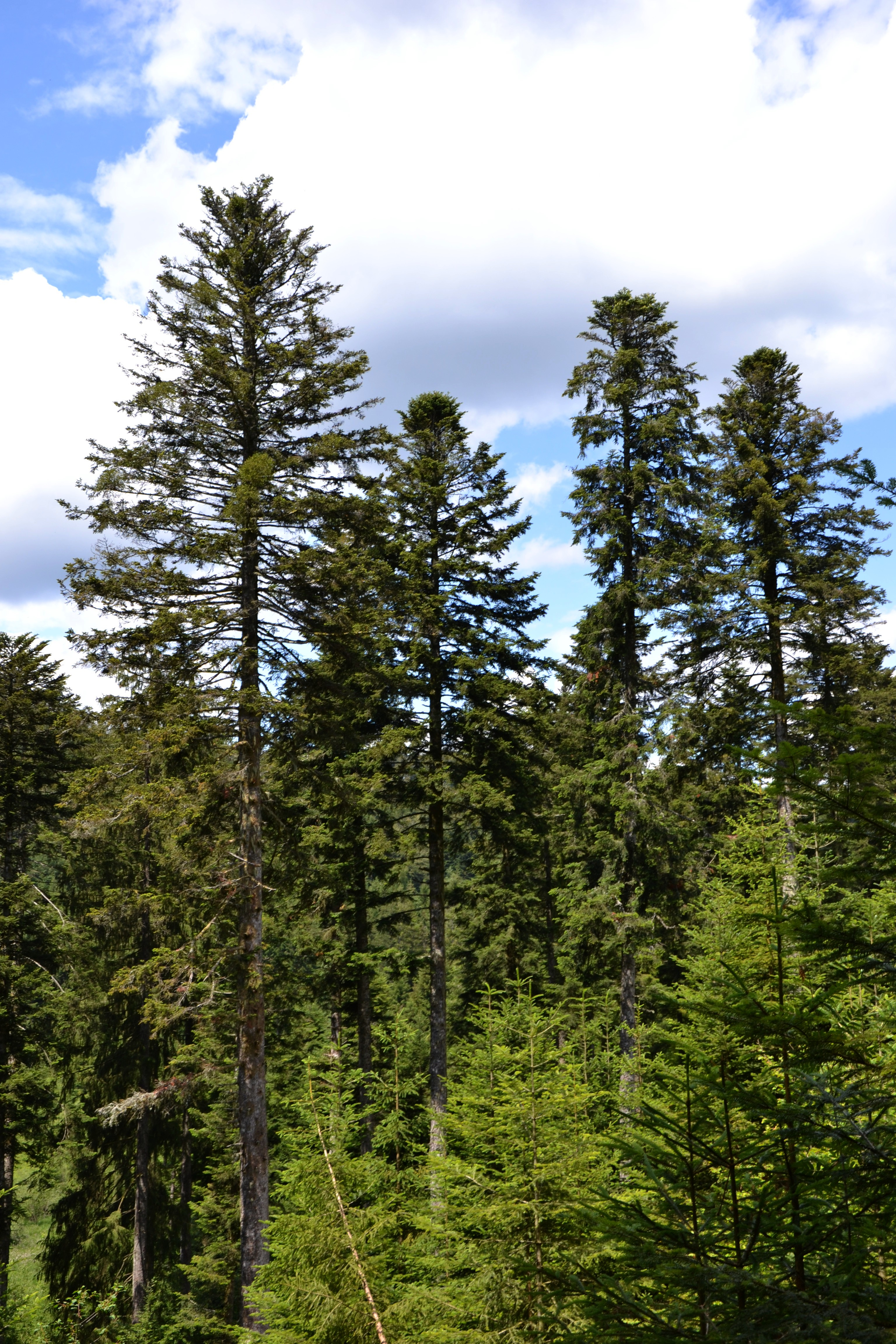
Silver fir, Le Tholy.

In the undergrowth of the beech-fir forest, if the soil is rich, wood fescues (Festuca altissima) comprise the ground cover. On the most impoverished acidic soils, the ground cover is primarily composed of wavy hair-grass (Deschampsia flexuosa), common bilberries (Vaccinium myrtillus), and white wood-rush (Luzula luzuloides). In these soil types, one may observe the presence of the common foxglove (Digitalis purpurea) and the purple lettuce (Prenanthes purpurea), which exhibit a preference for clearings. The common foxglove is a species that is widely distributed and can be found invading forest clearings, edges, and pathsides. It attains a height of approximately one meter and produces a cluster of pink flowers with dark red spots bordered in white, which turn towards the light. Open spaces are also colonized by rosebay willowherb (Chamerion angustifolium). Following logging operations, it appears in large numbers but becomes increasingly rare as the forest closes in. These open spaces are frequently occupied by a common broom (Cytisus scoparius), a common yellow-flowered shrub. The flora of the area includes shrubs such as the rowan (Sorbus aucuparia) and, in some open areas, junipers (Juniperus communis).

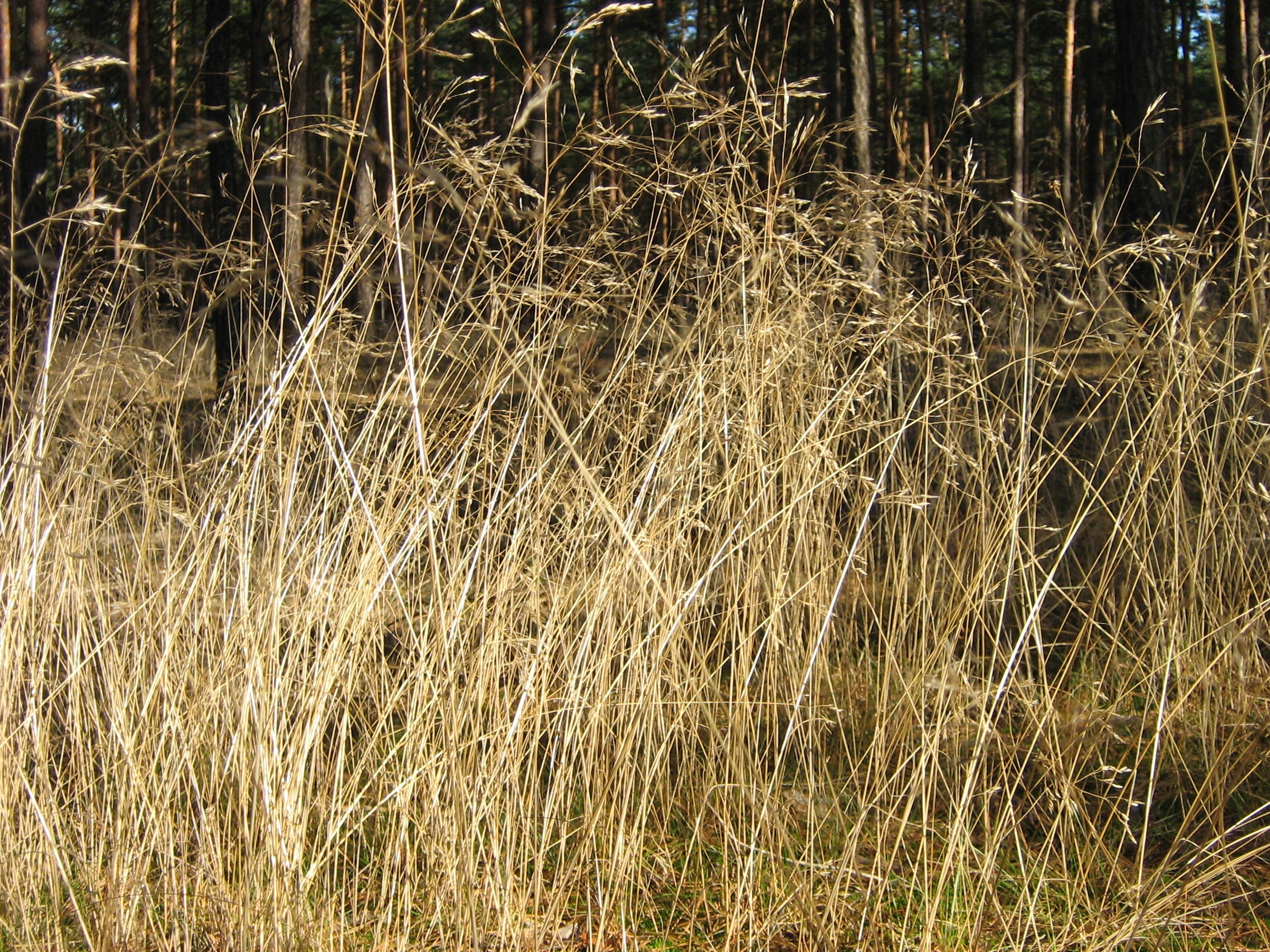
Wavy hair-grass.

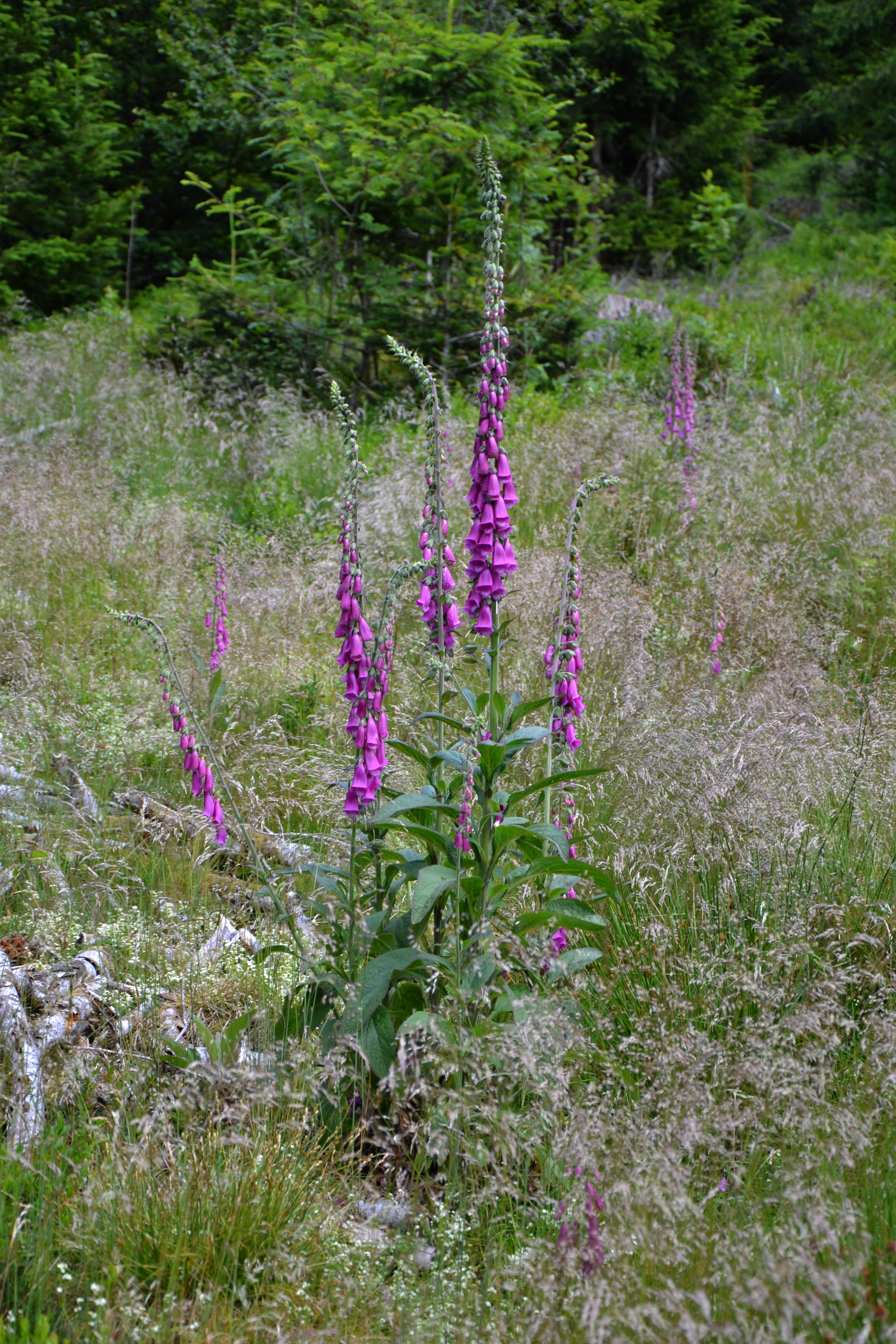
Common foxglove, Le Tholy.

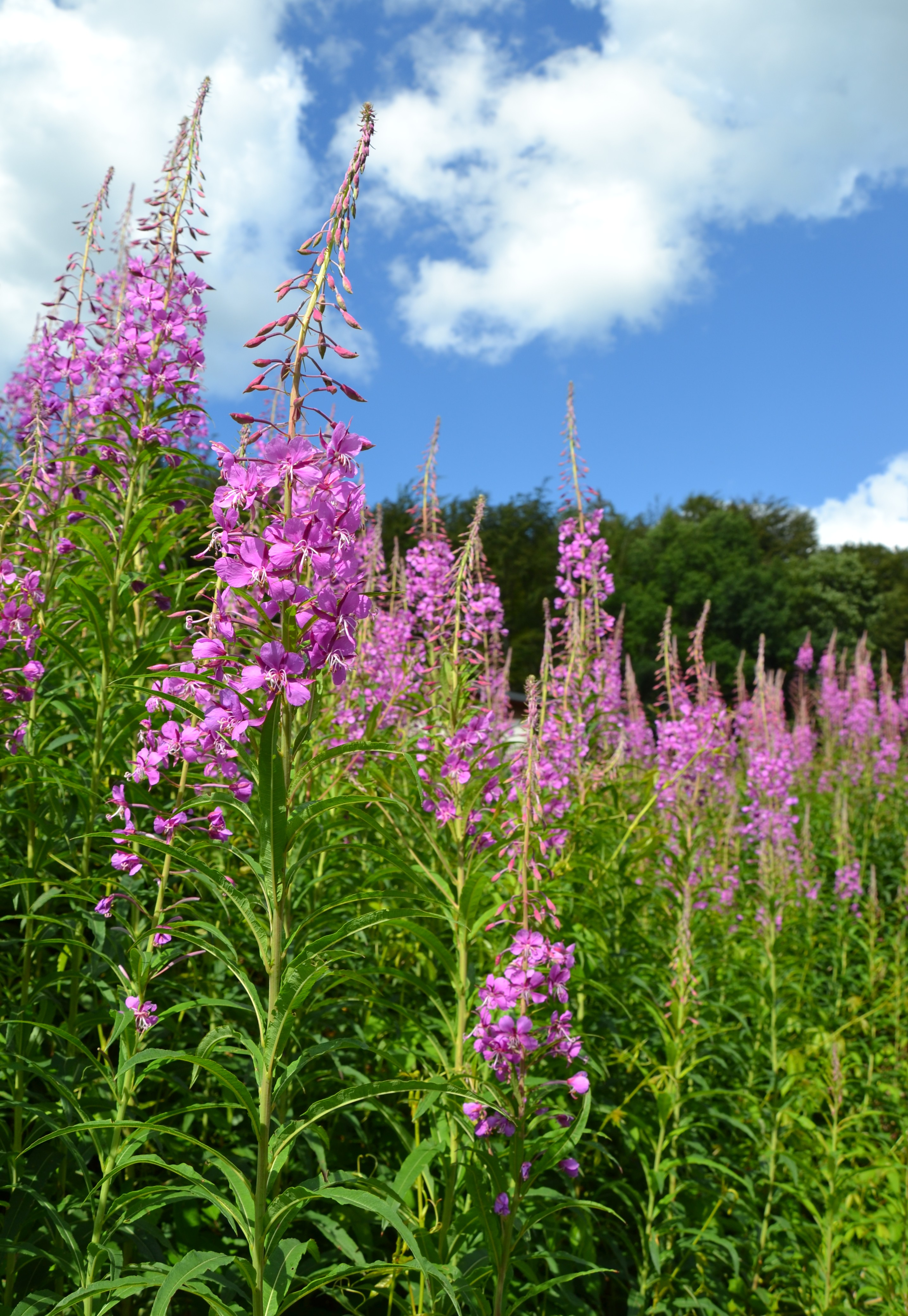
Rosebay willowherb, Le Tholy.

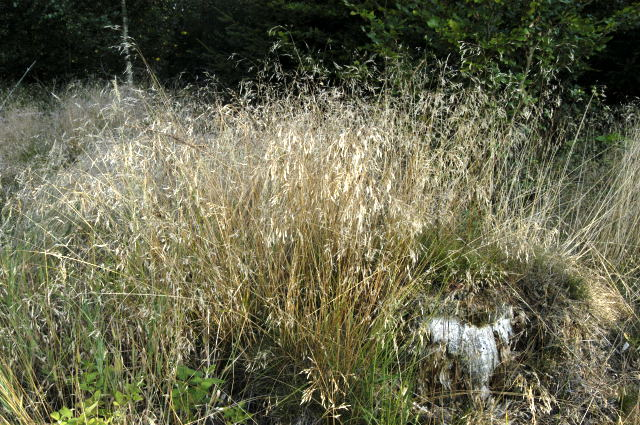
Wood fescue.

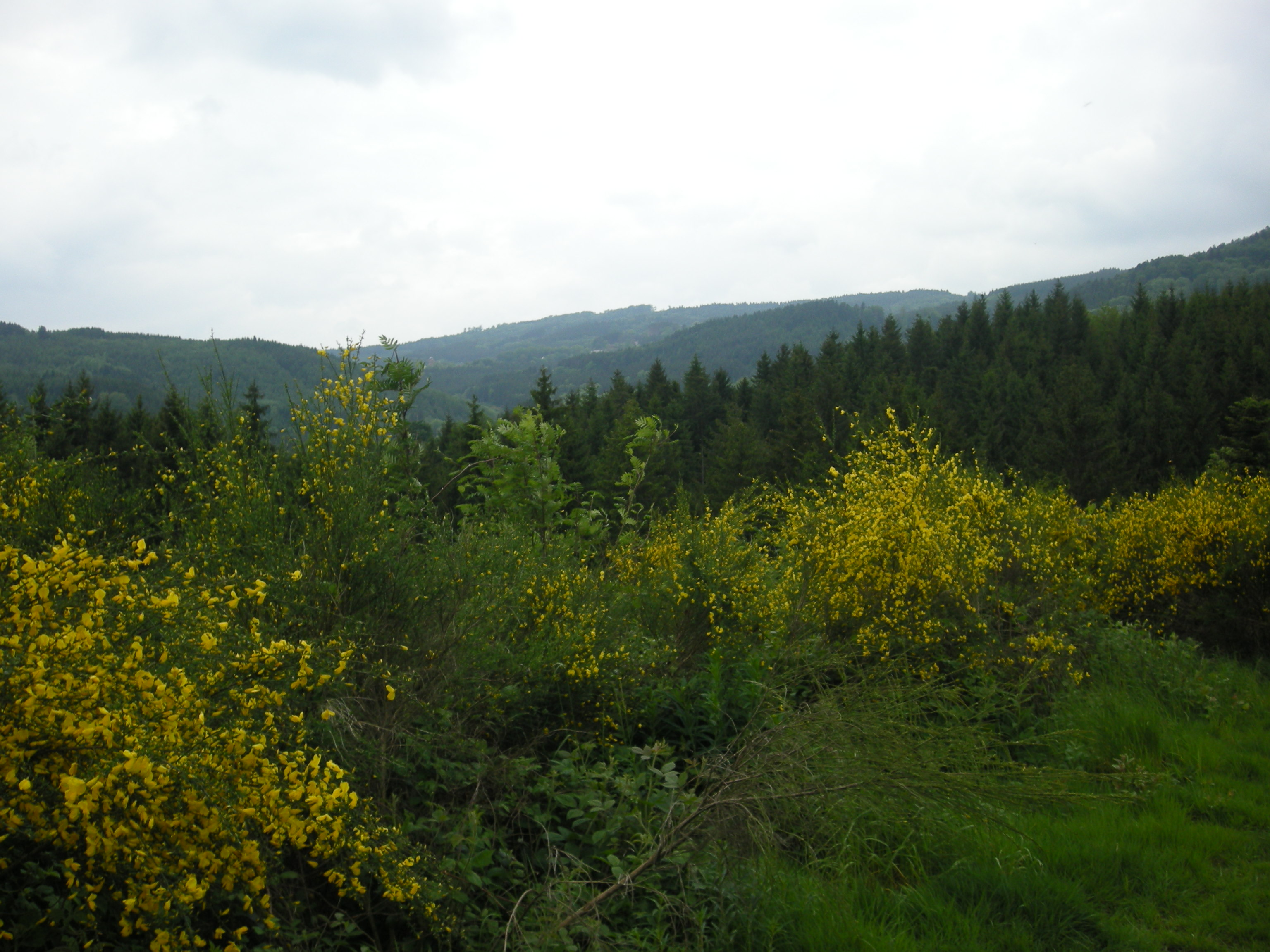
Common broom, Col de Saales.

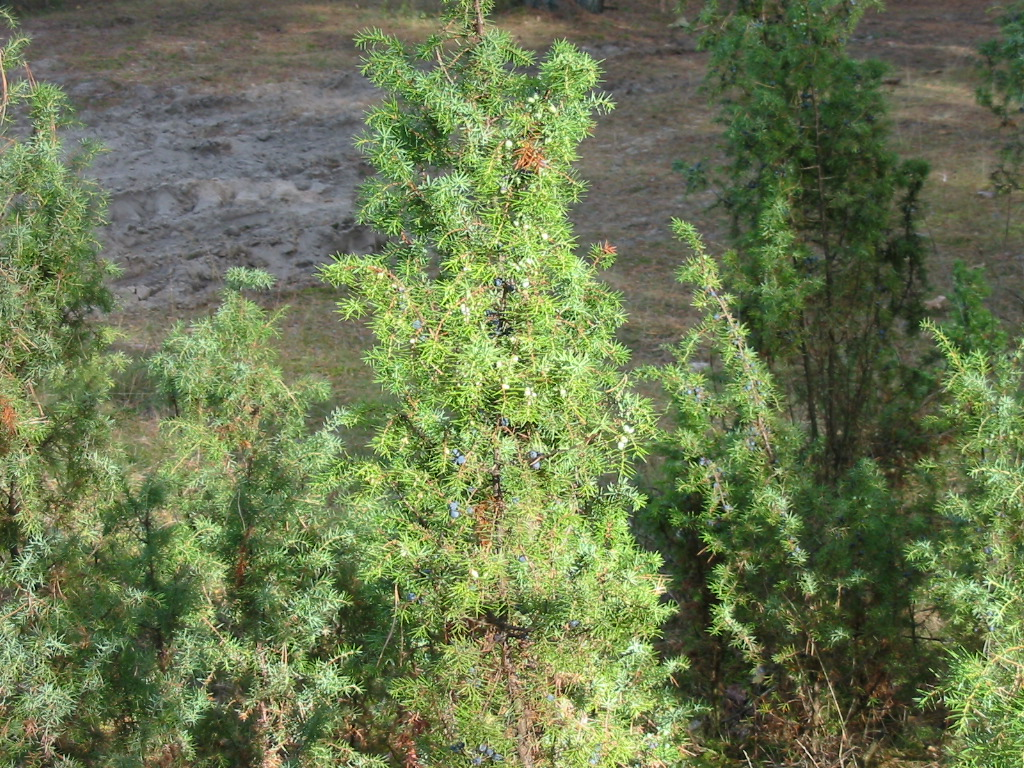
Common juniper.

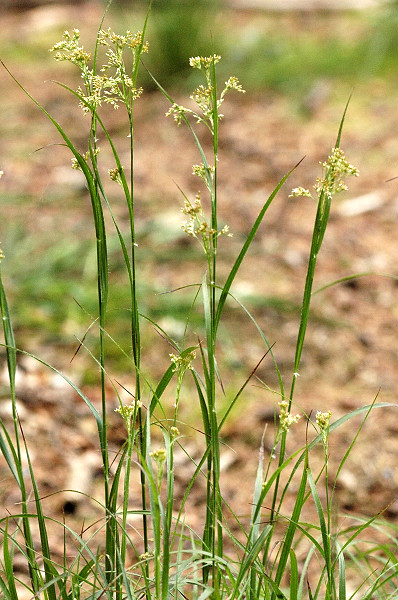
White wood-rush.

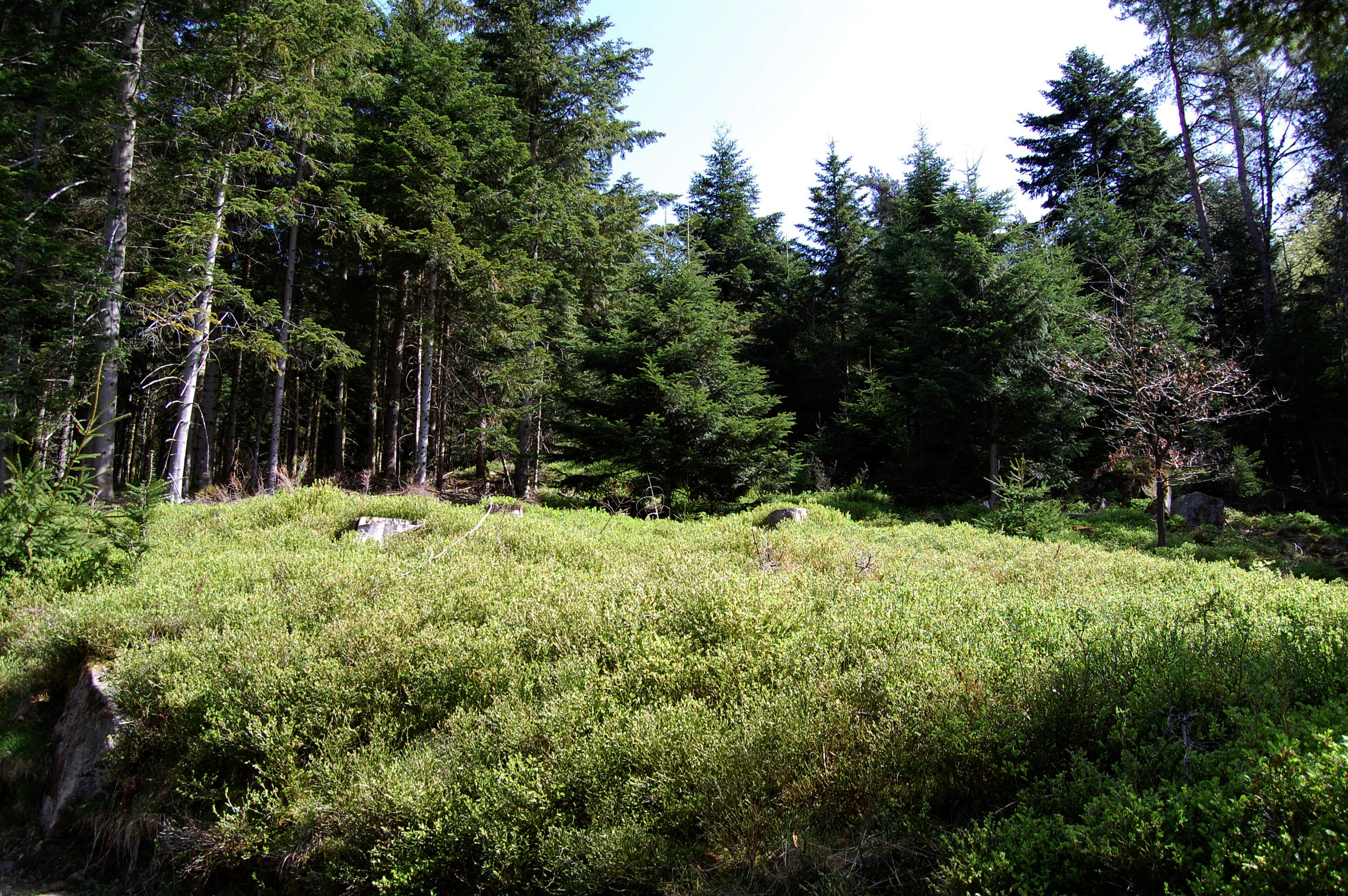
Blueberries in the undergrowth, Le Tholy.

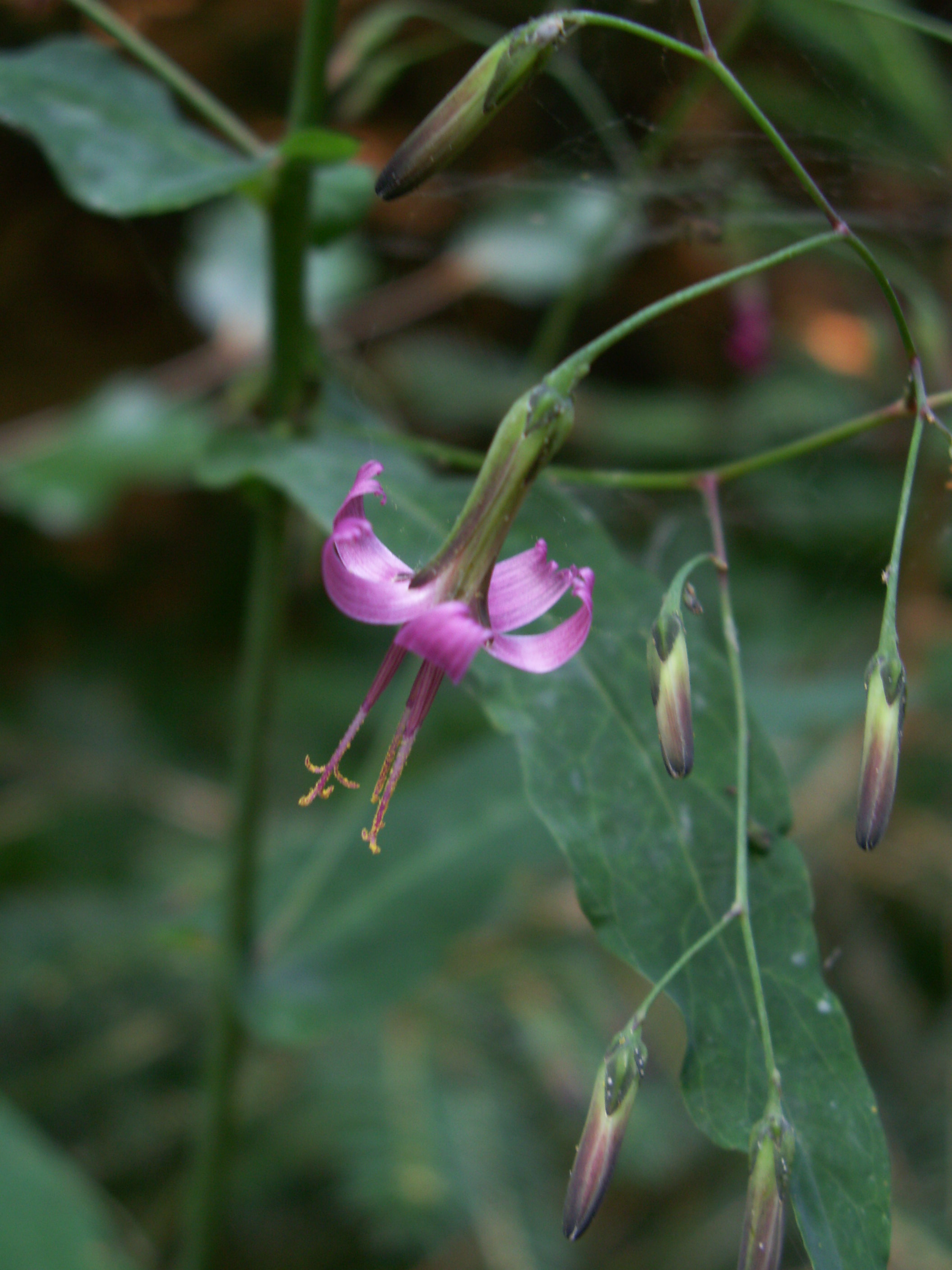
Purple lettuce.

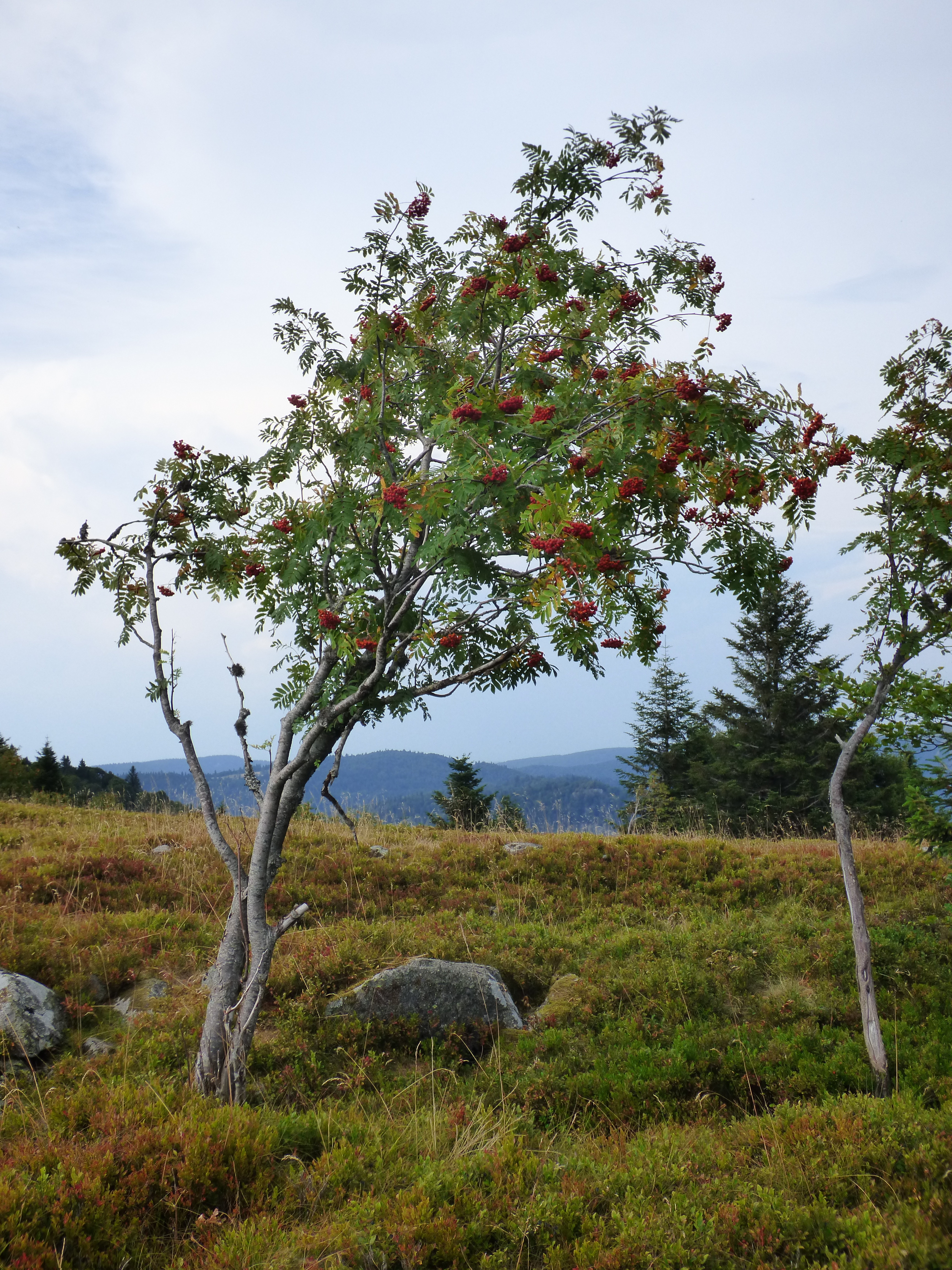
Rowan at Grand Ventron.

==== Screes ====
The formation of screes on steep slopes can be attributed to the fragmentation of rocks as a result of the freeze-thaw cycle. In these ravines, the dominant tree species are sycamore maples (Acer pseudoplatanus), wych elms (Ulmus glabra), common ashes or European ashes (Fraxinus excelsior), and large-leaved lindens (Tilia platyphyllos). These tree species can obtain the requisite light and minerals for their survival in this environment. The presence of rocks acts as a barrier to competition from beeches and firs. In the undergrowth, the rare giant bellflower (Campanula latifolia) can be found.

In some screes, such as the one in the Kertoff Gorge in the Vologne Valley, Picea abies, commonly known as the Vosges spruce, can be observed. Some of these trees, which can exceed 50 meters in height, have been genetically selected as part of forestry research.

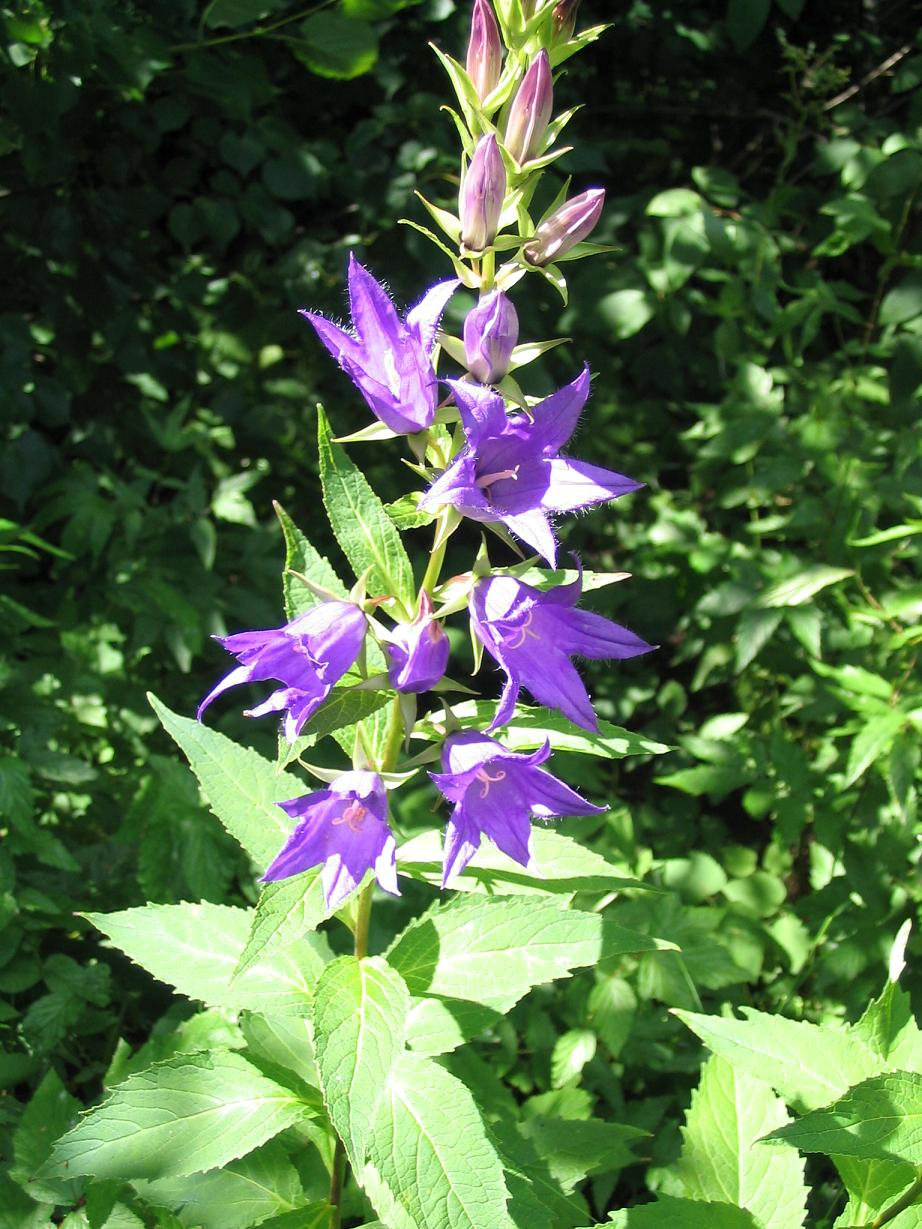
Giant bellflower.

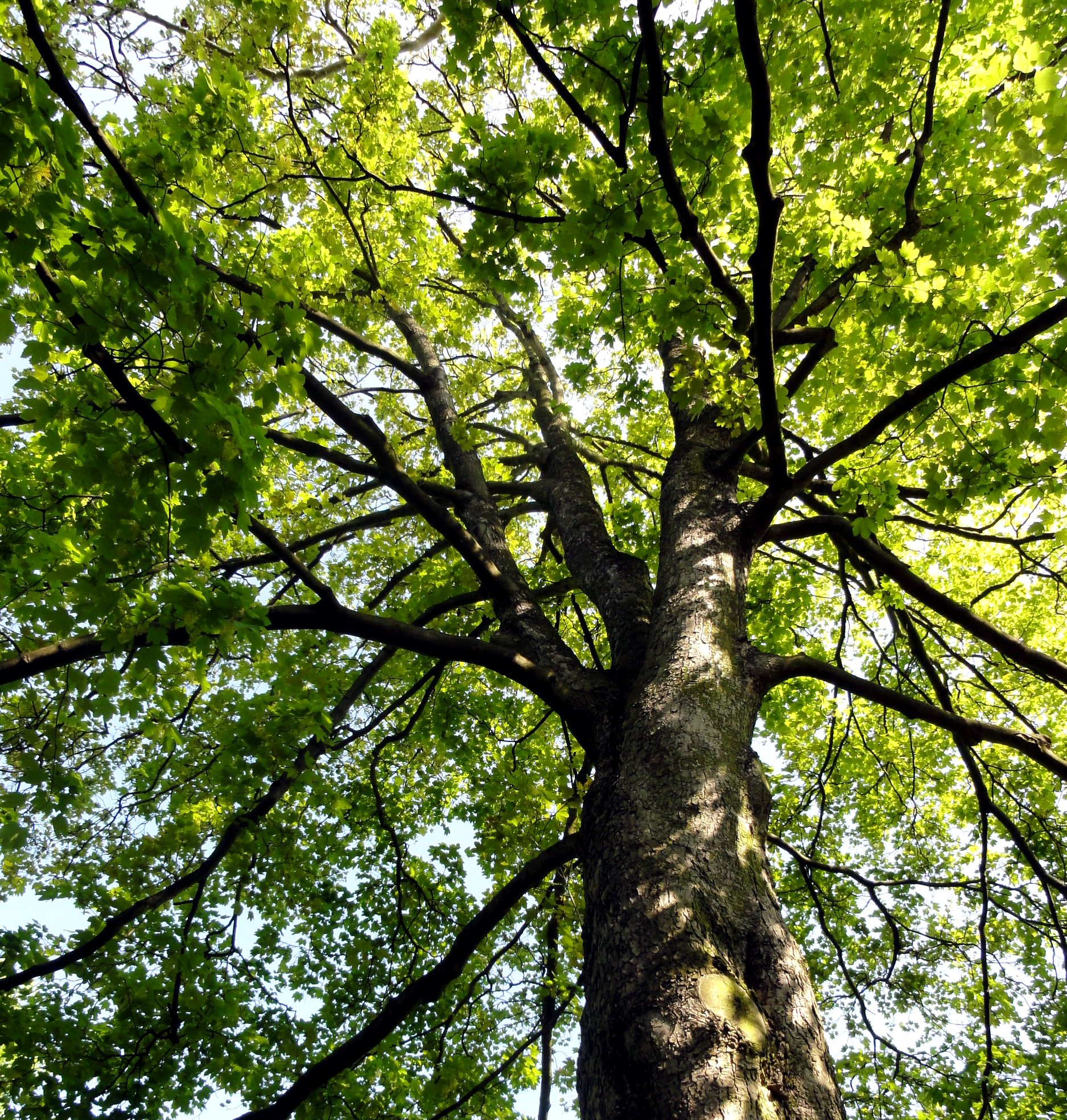
Sycamore maple.

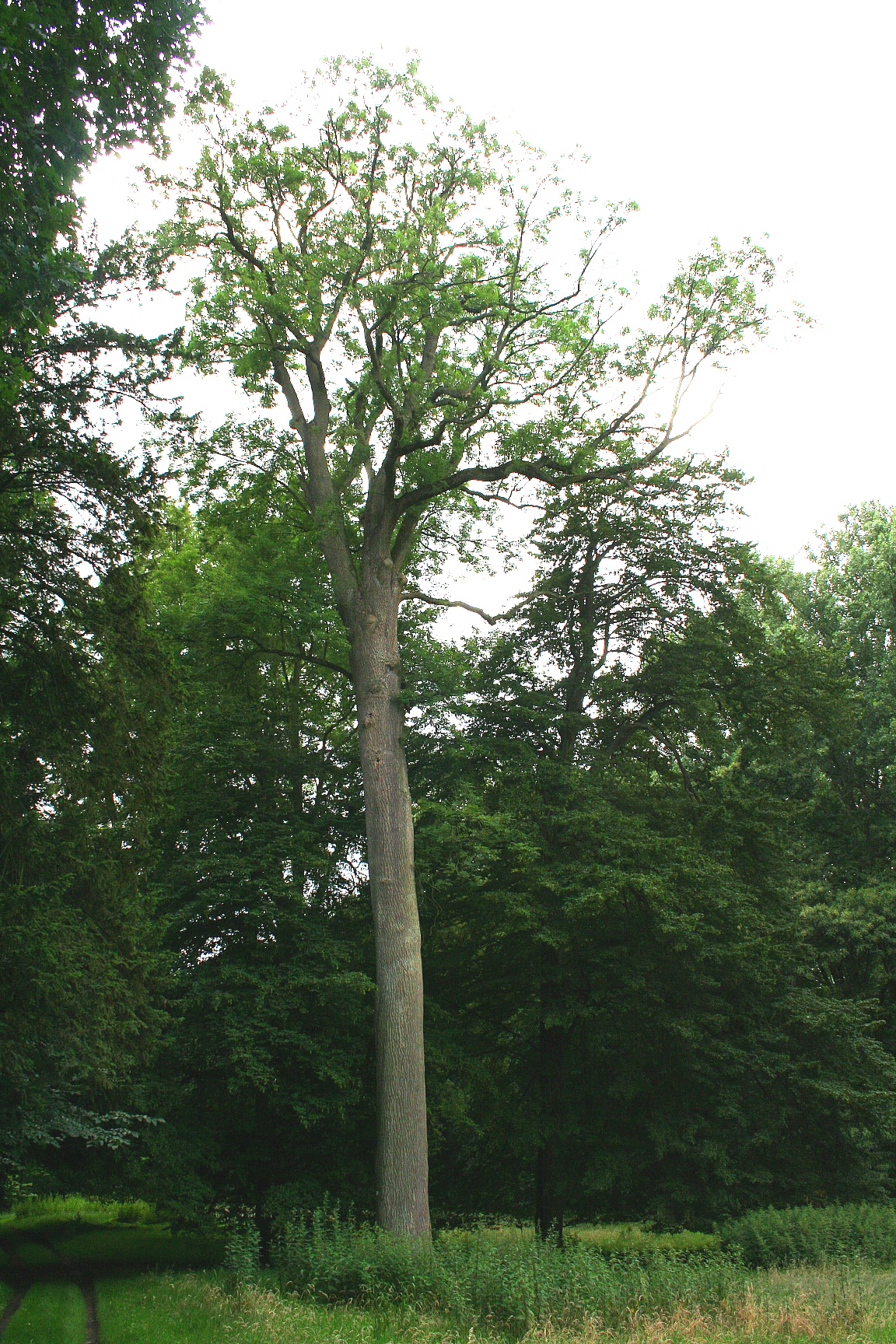
Common ash.

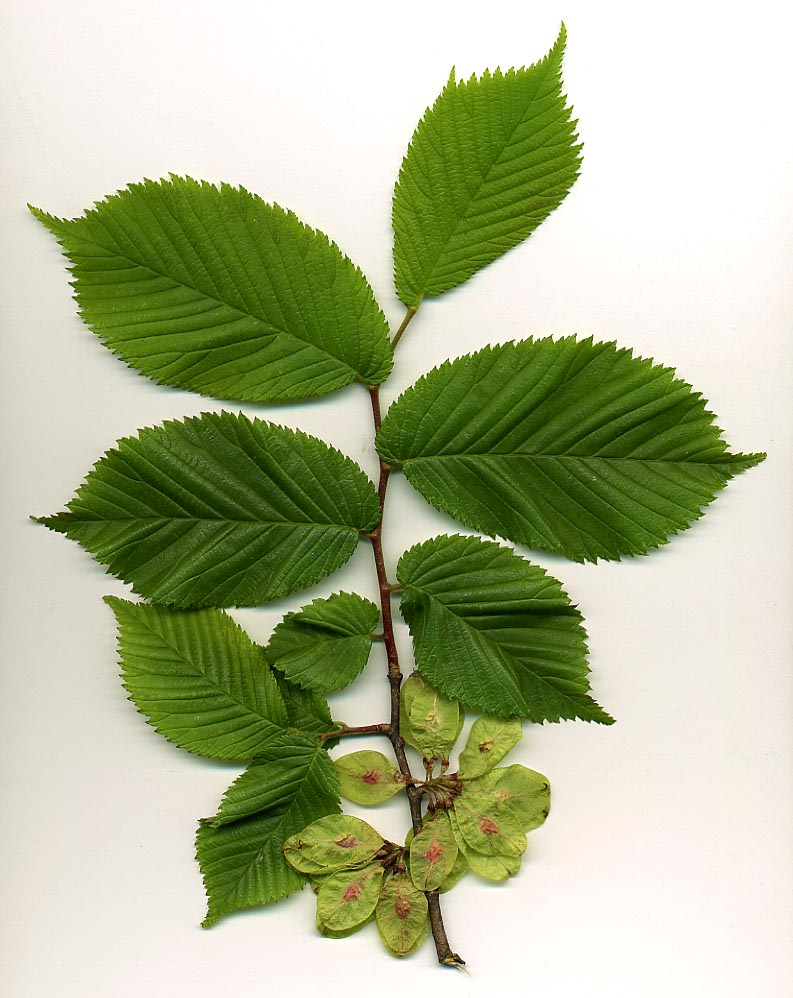
Wych elm.

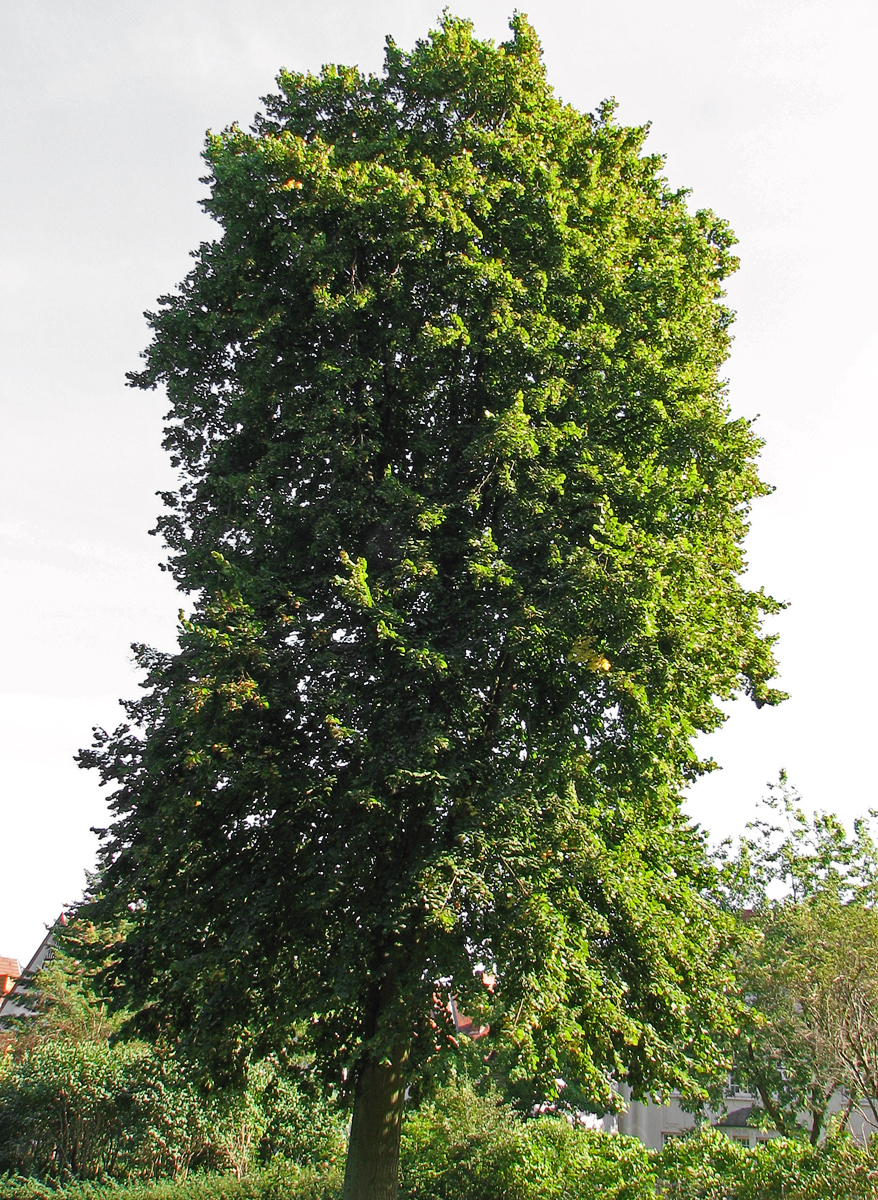
Large-leaved lindens.

==== Glacial cirques and subalpine zone ====
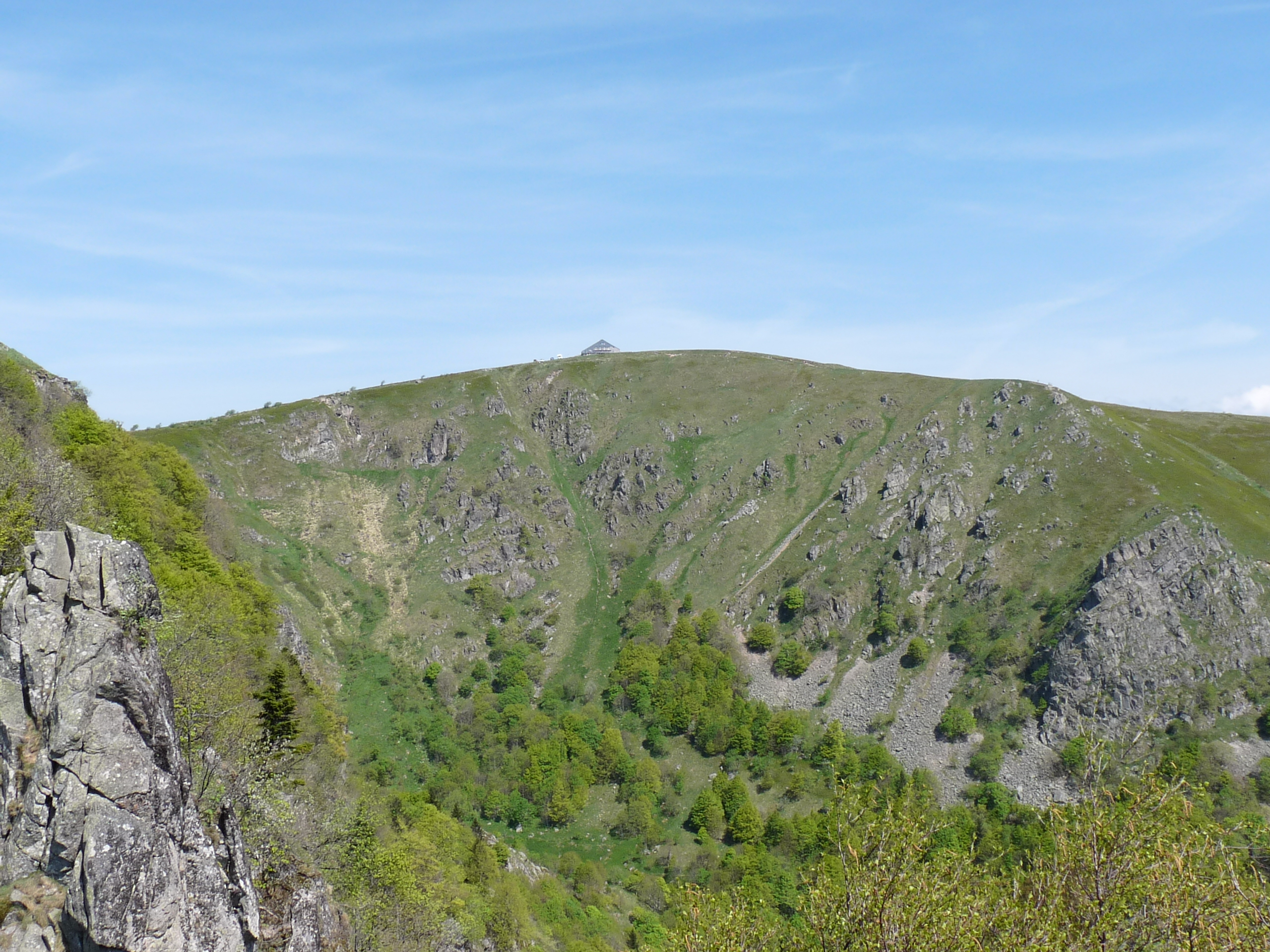
View of the Wormspel glacial cirque below the Hohneck from the Spitzkoepfe ridge.

During the last glacial period, known as the Würm, which spanned from 70,000 to 11,000 years before the present era, the Vosges were covered by vast glaciers that eroded the landscape and formed glacial cirques. The Vosges glacial cirques and the high moors constitute a truly alpine environment, which appears at altitudes above 1,000 meters with very harsh conditions only found in the Alps above 2,000 meters. The region experiences over 160 frost days per year, and snow cover can persist until early summer. However, with the currently observed climate warming, the snow usually melts by mid-May or even late April.

In the spring, one of the earliest flowers to appear is the spring snowflake (Leucojum vernum), which bears a resemblance to the snowdrop (Galanthus nivalis), (Note: Galanthus nivalis is not found in the Vosges in the wild.) but its flower is larger. It is found in proximity to the yellow star-of-Bethlehem (Gagea lutea) and the hollowroot (Corydalis cava), which reach their maximum altitude limit at this location. The mezereon (Daphne mezereum), a small shrub with pleasantly fragrant flowers, can also be found in this area.

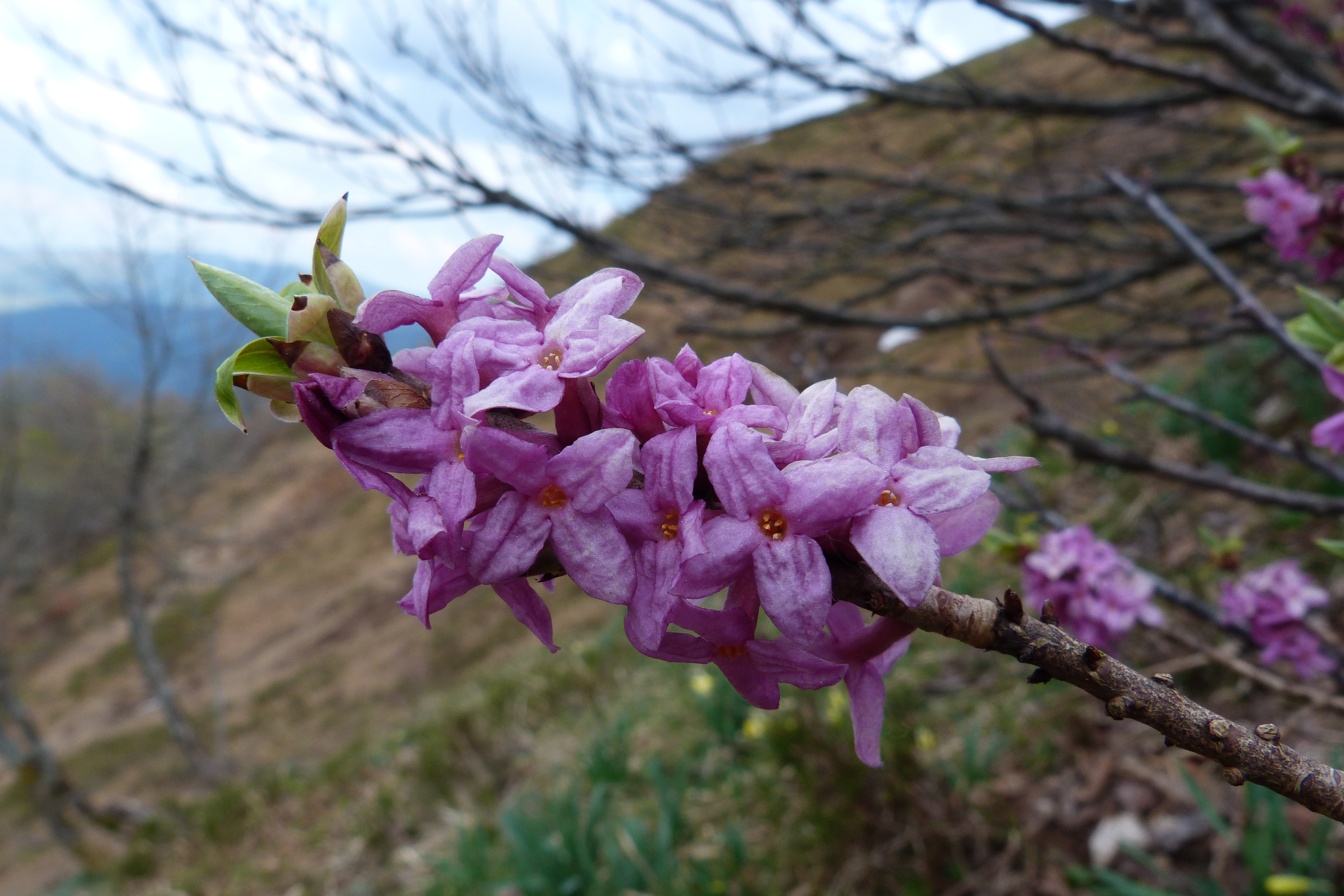
Mezereon towards the Rainkopf.

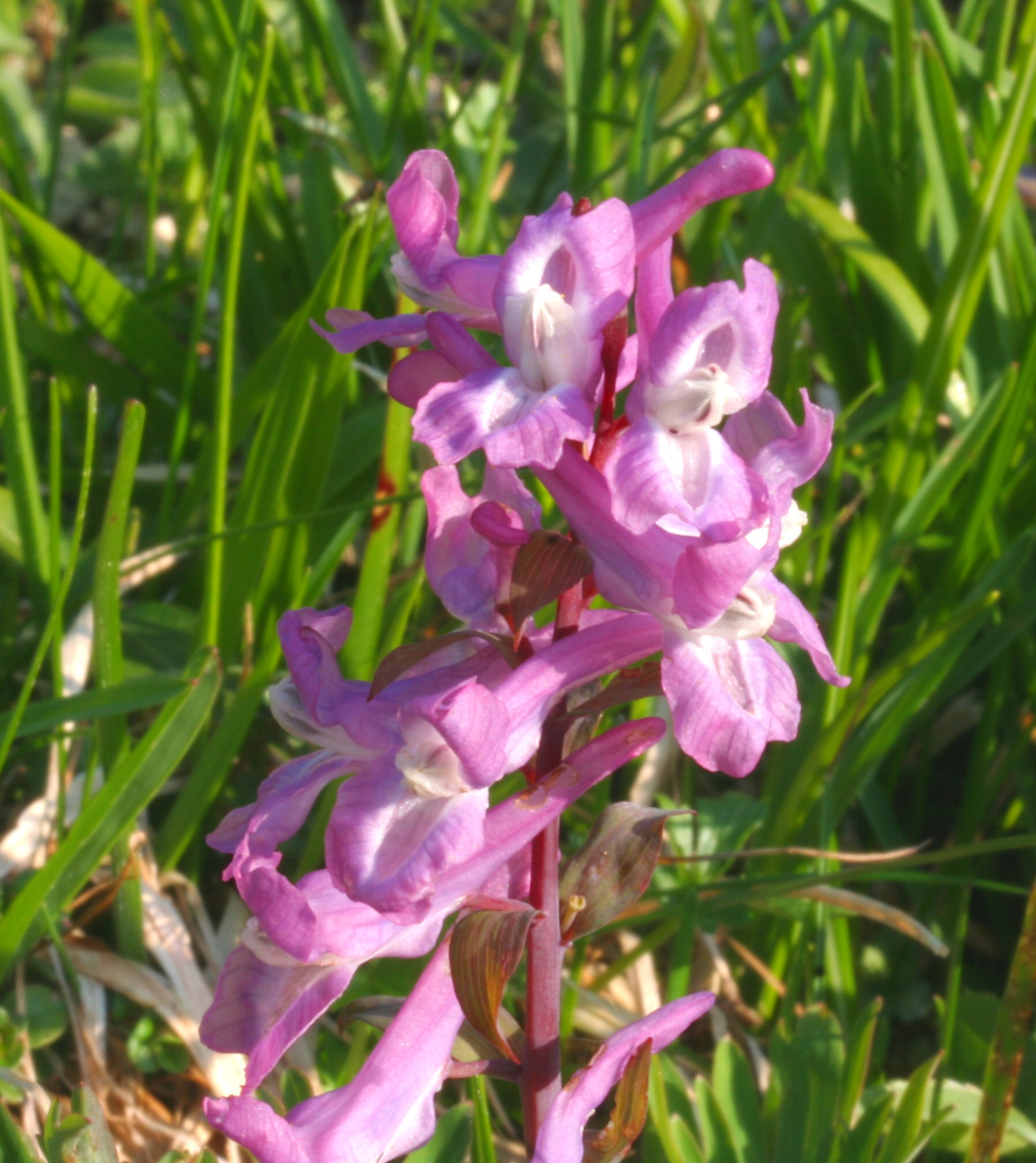
Hollowroot.

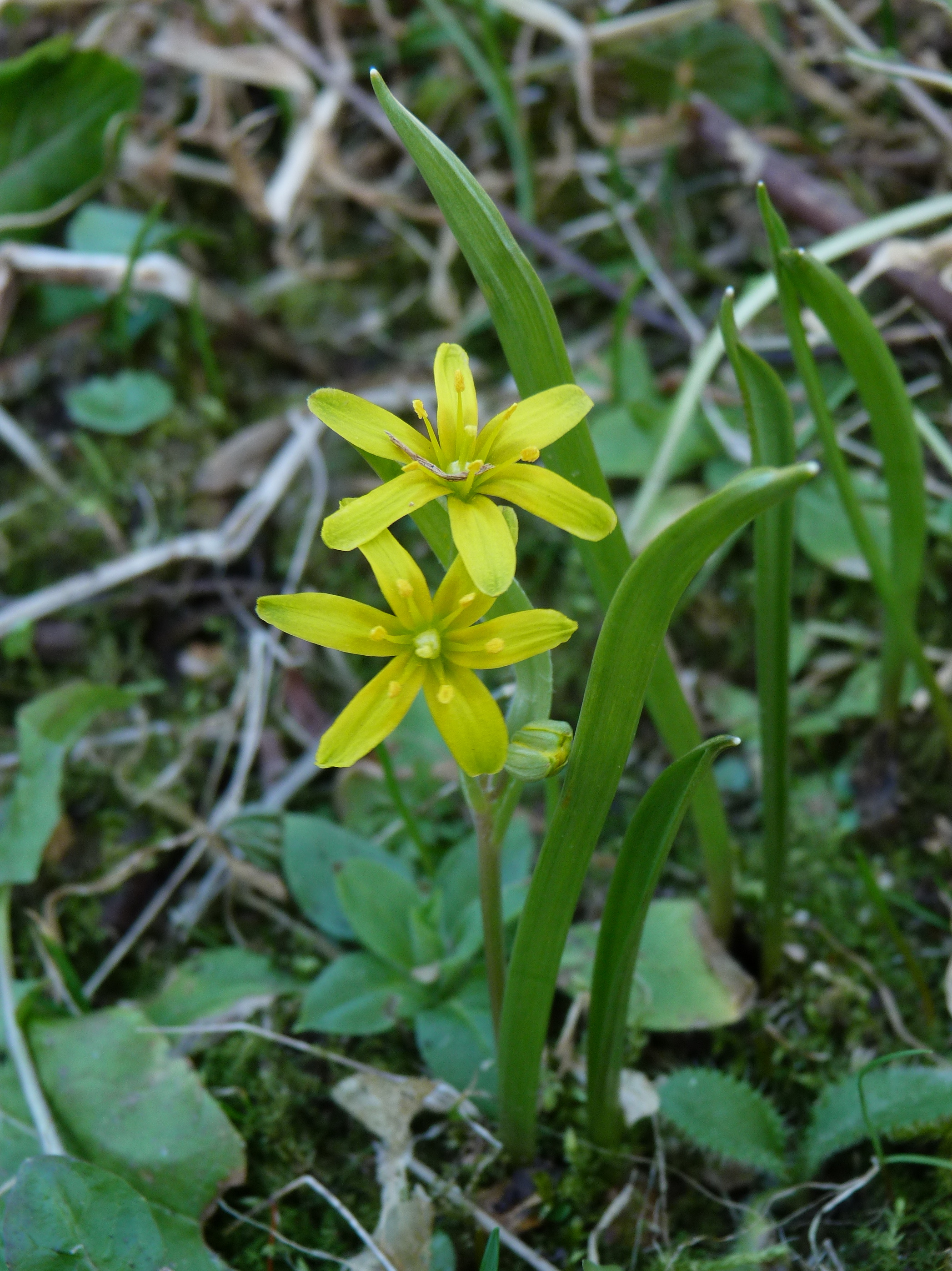
Yellow star-of-Bethlehem, Retournemer lake.

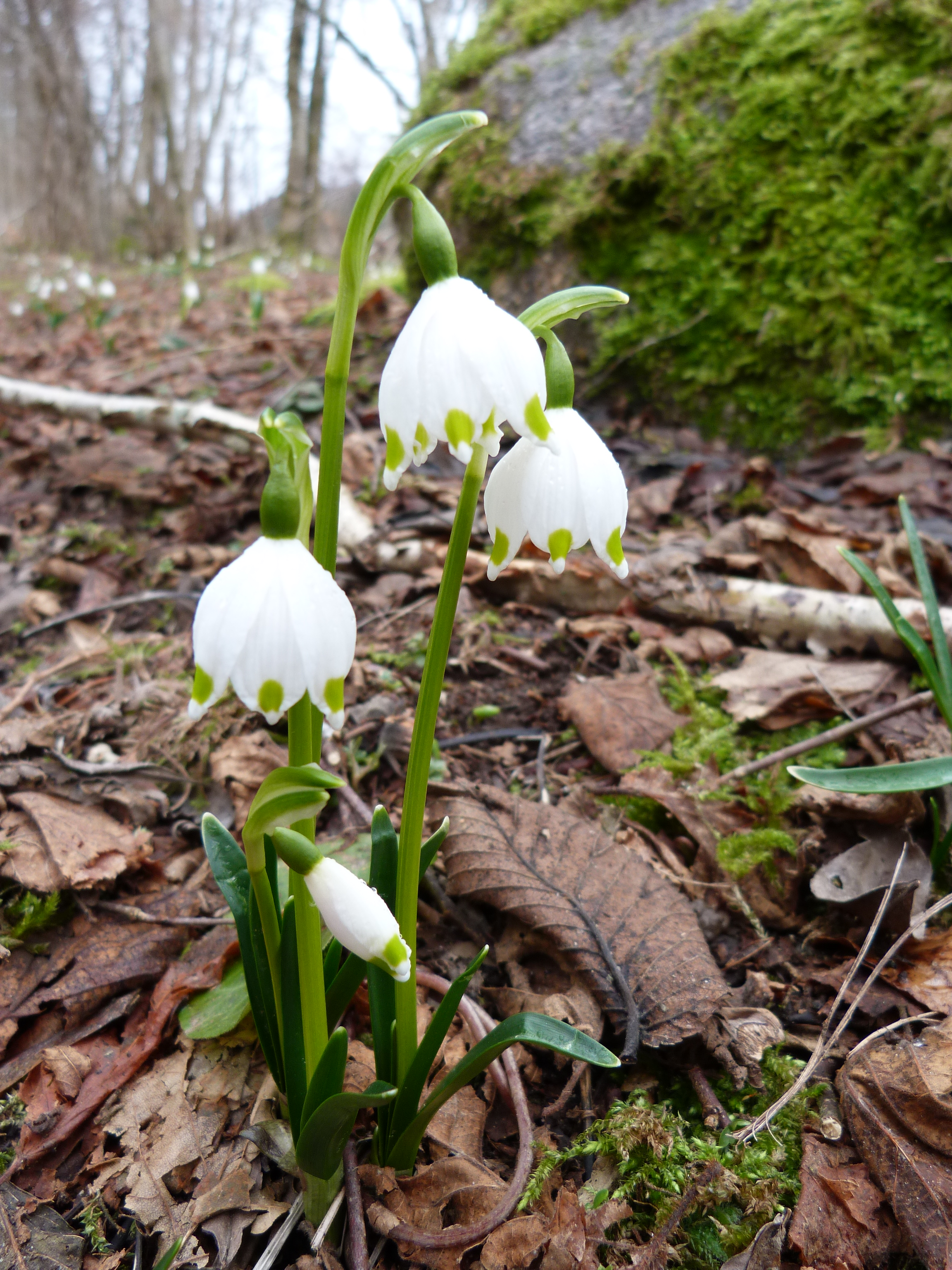
Spring snowflake, Planois.

During the summer months, particularly in areas susceptible to avalanches, tall herbaceous plants, known as megaphorbs, flourish. These plants develop on stony soils on north-facing, humid slopes, where the presence of trees is precluded by avalanches and a growing season of just over two months. Among these megaphorbs, the alpine fireweed (Epilobium alpestre) and the rosebay willowherb (Chamerion angustifolium) can be identified. The latter also colonizes valleys. Additionally, the yellow adder's mouth (Adenostyles alliariae) is present, along with two lettuce species that can reach 1.5 meters in height: the alpine blue sow-thistle (Cicerbita alpina) with mauve flowers and Plumier's sow-thistle (Cicerbita plumieri) with blue flowers. Two toxic plants are present: the monkshood (Aconitum napellus), which has violet helmet-shaped flowers, and the wolfsbane (Aconitum lycoctonum), which has yellow flowers. Additionally, shrubs such as wild roses, including the alpine rose (Rosa pendulina) and the burnet rose (Rosa pimpinellifolia), are also found.

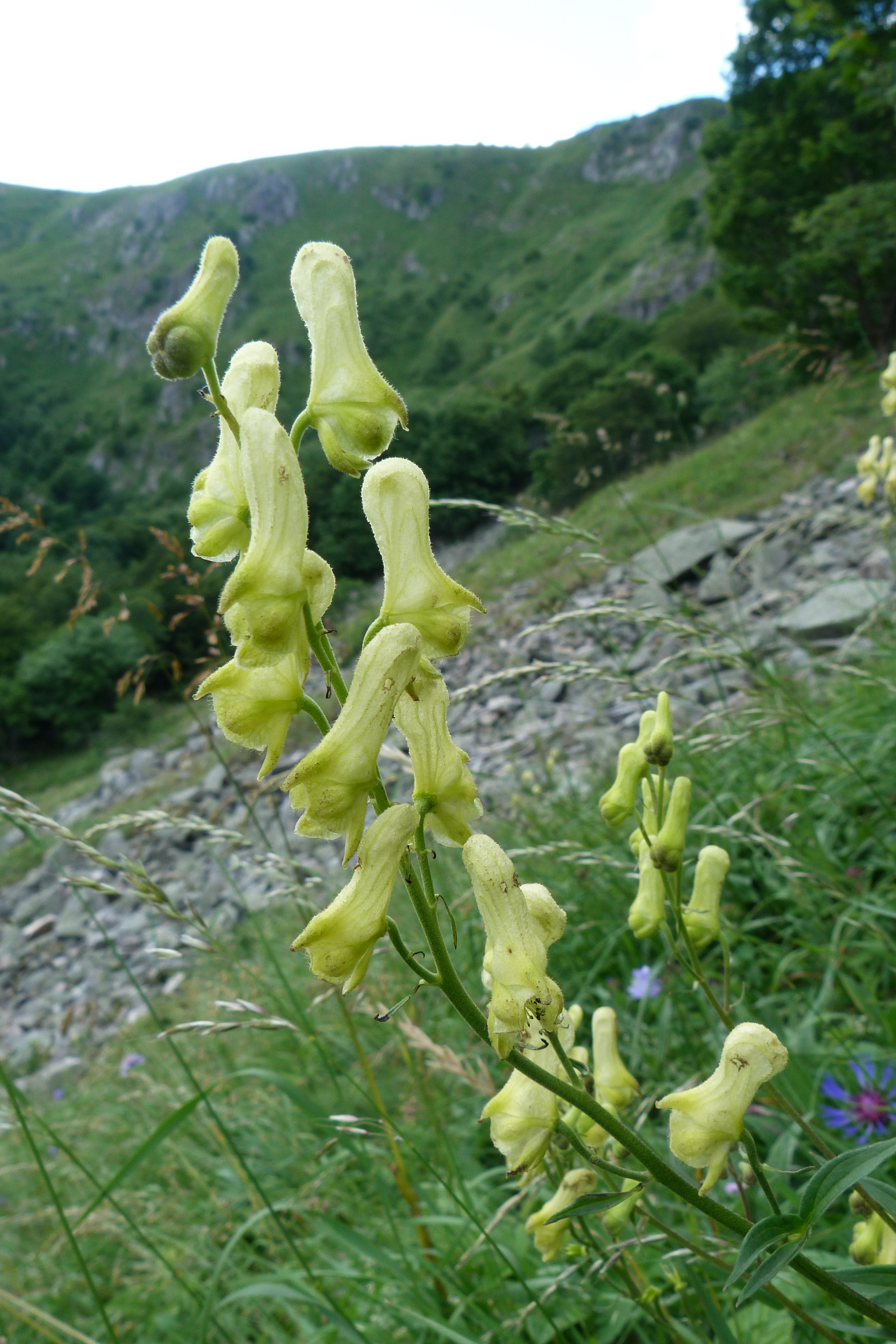
Wolfsbane in the Wormspel cirque.

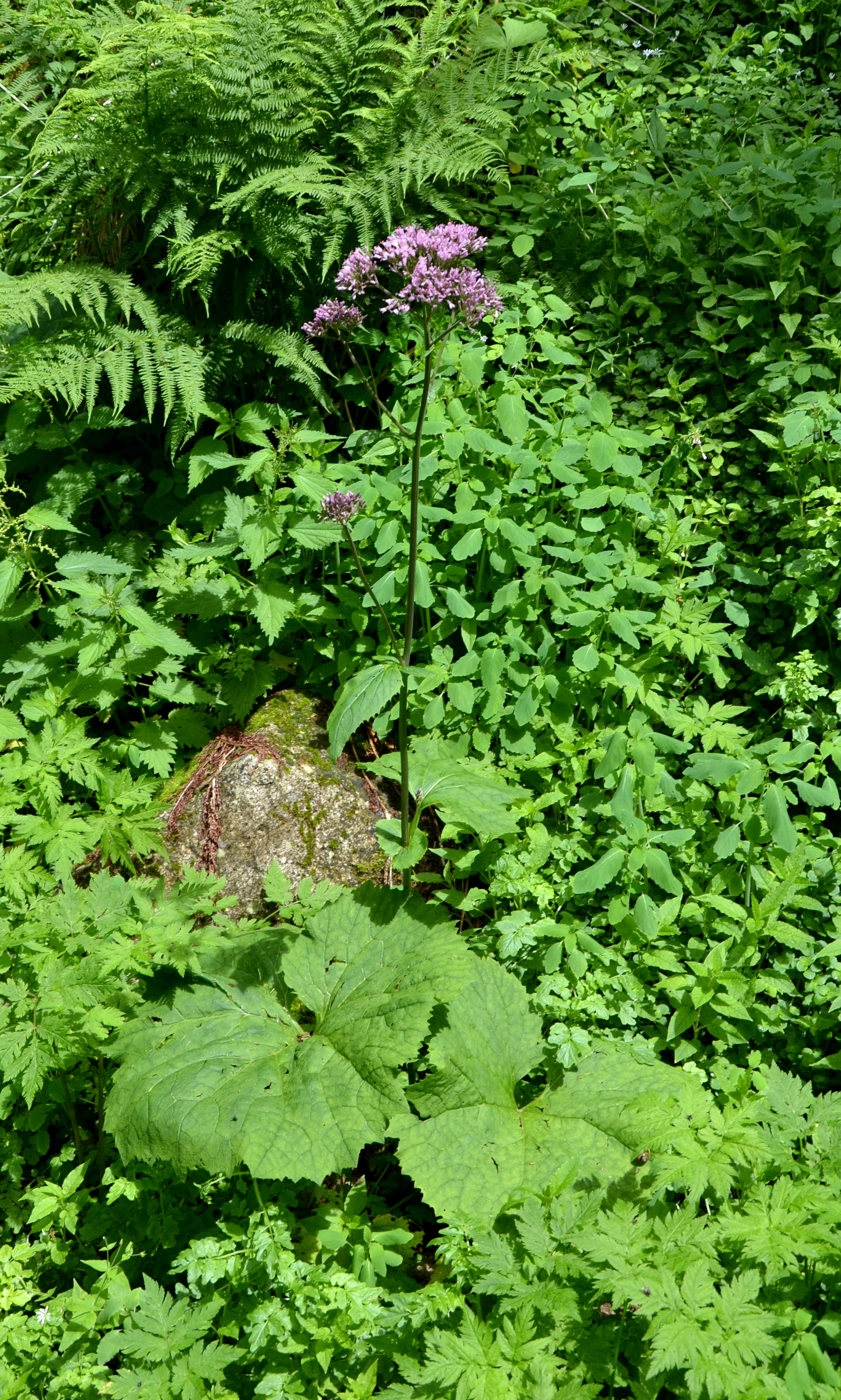
Yellow adder's mouth, Xonrupt.

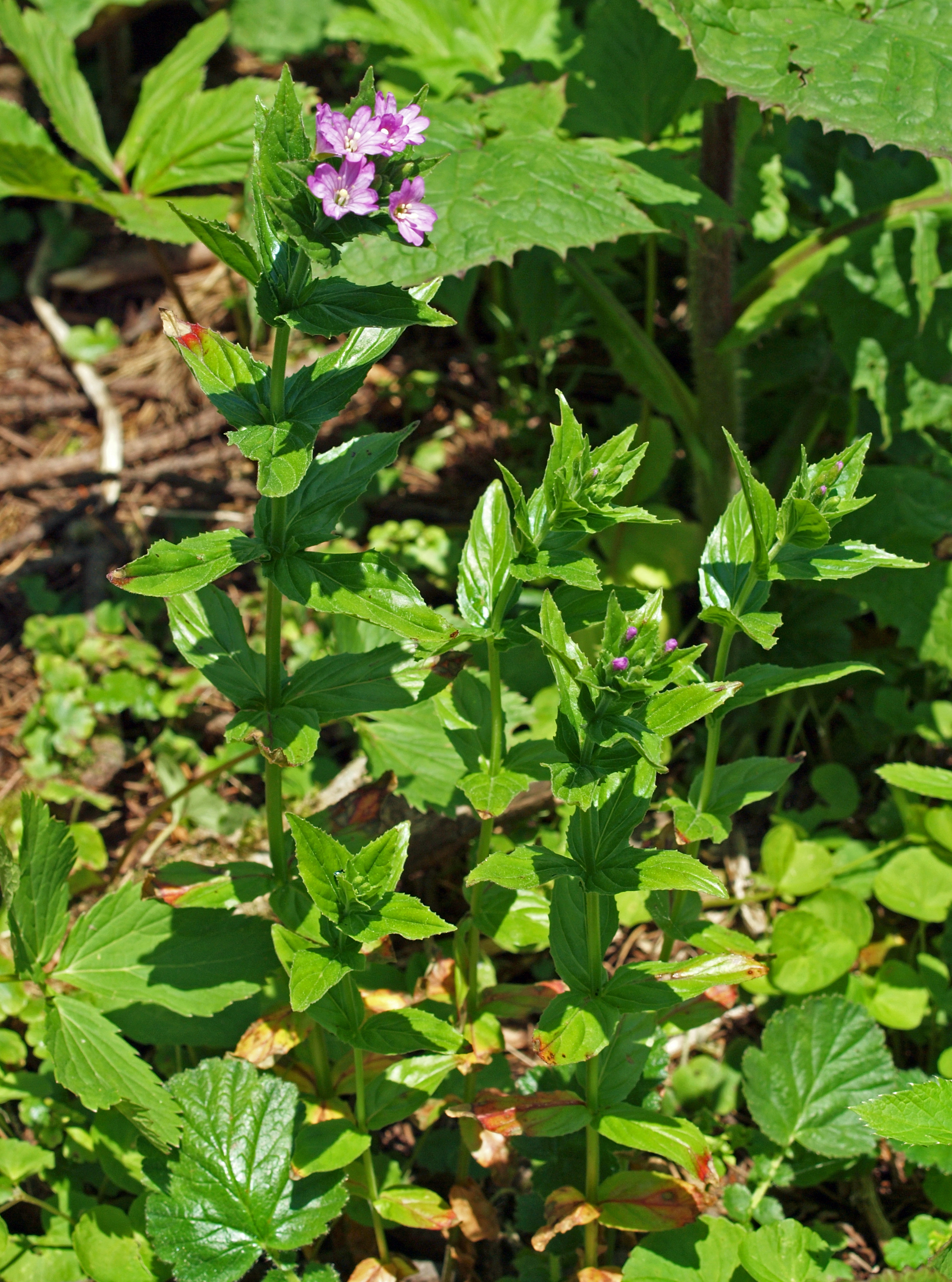
Alpine fireweed.

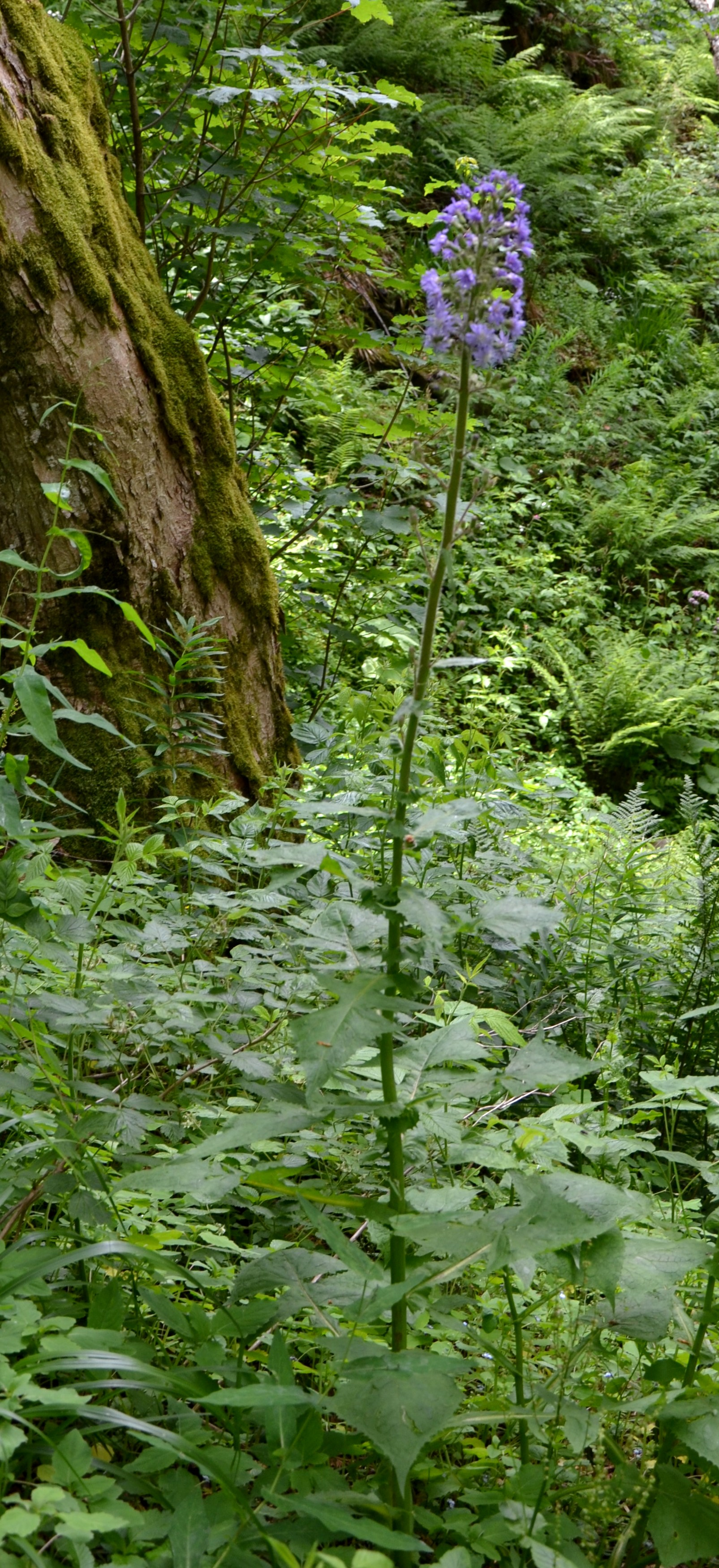
Alpine blue sow-thistle, Xonrupt.

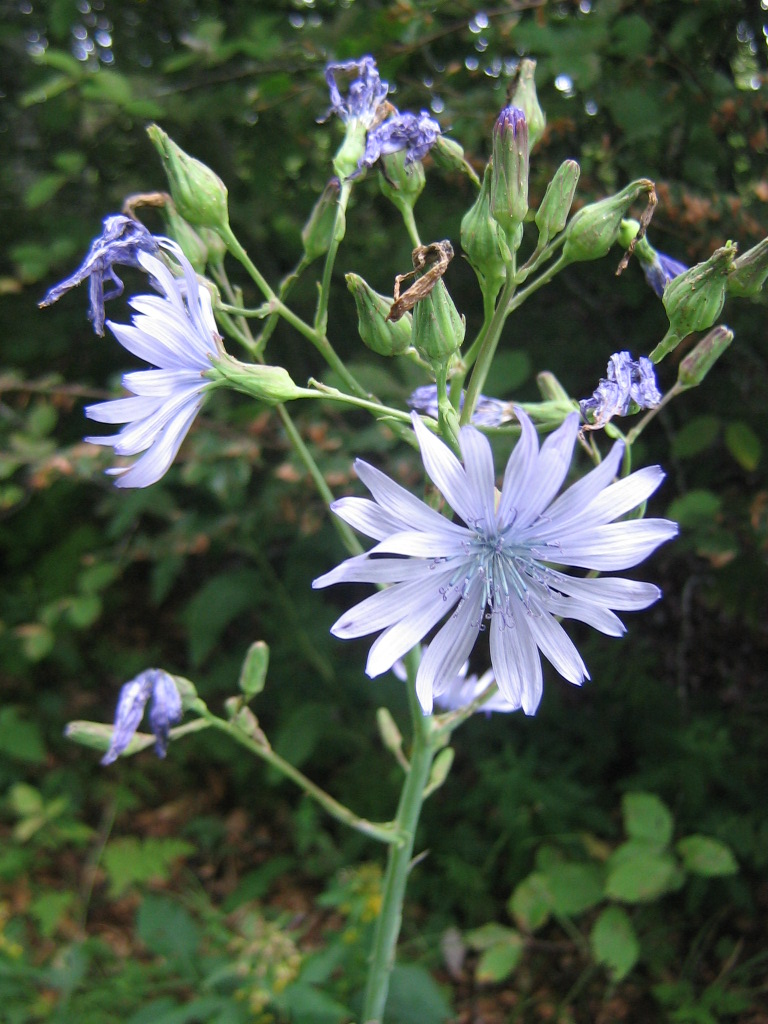
Plumier's sow-thistle.

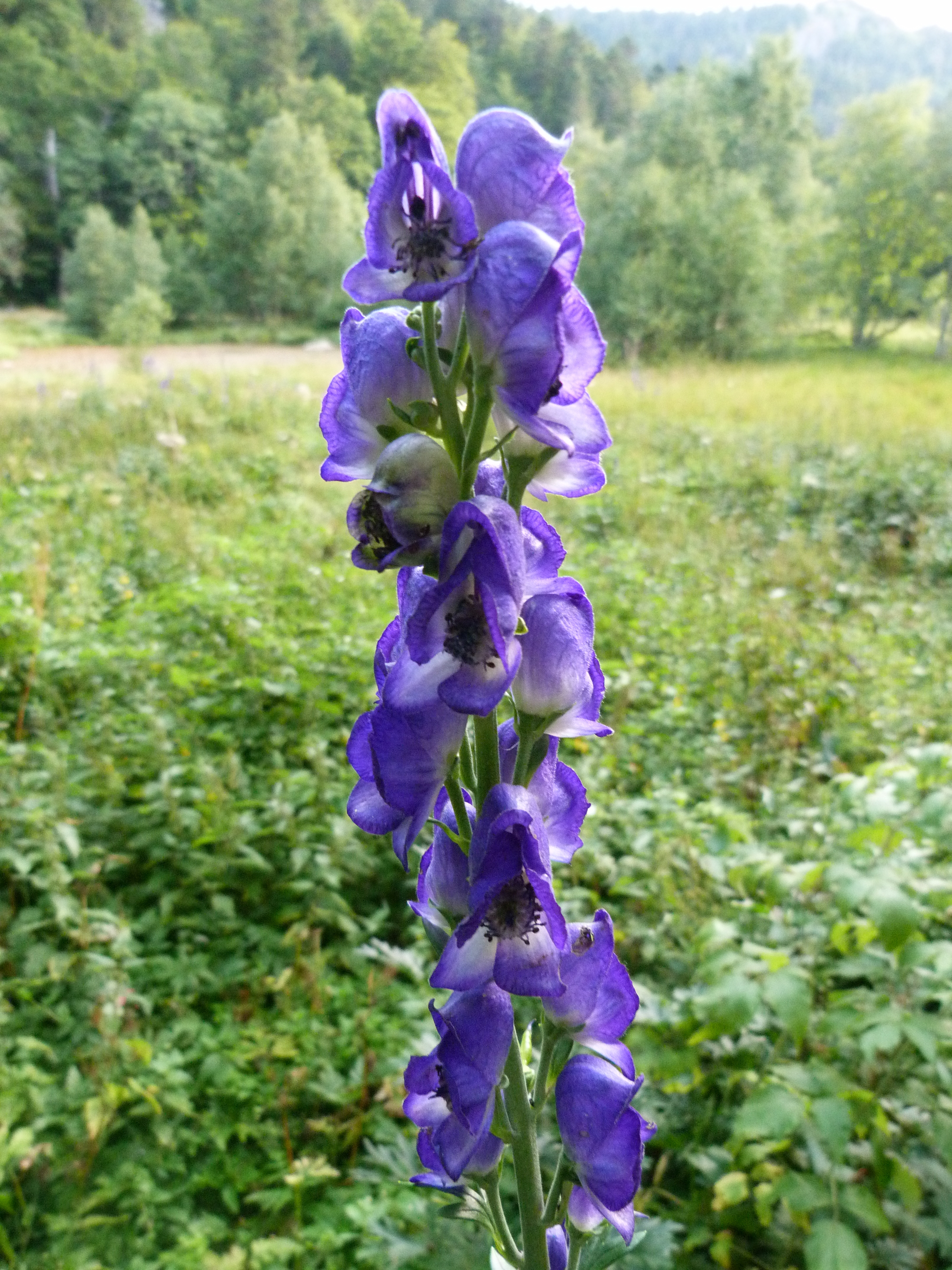
Monkshood in Frankenthal.

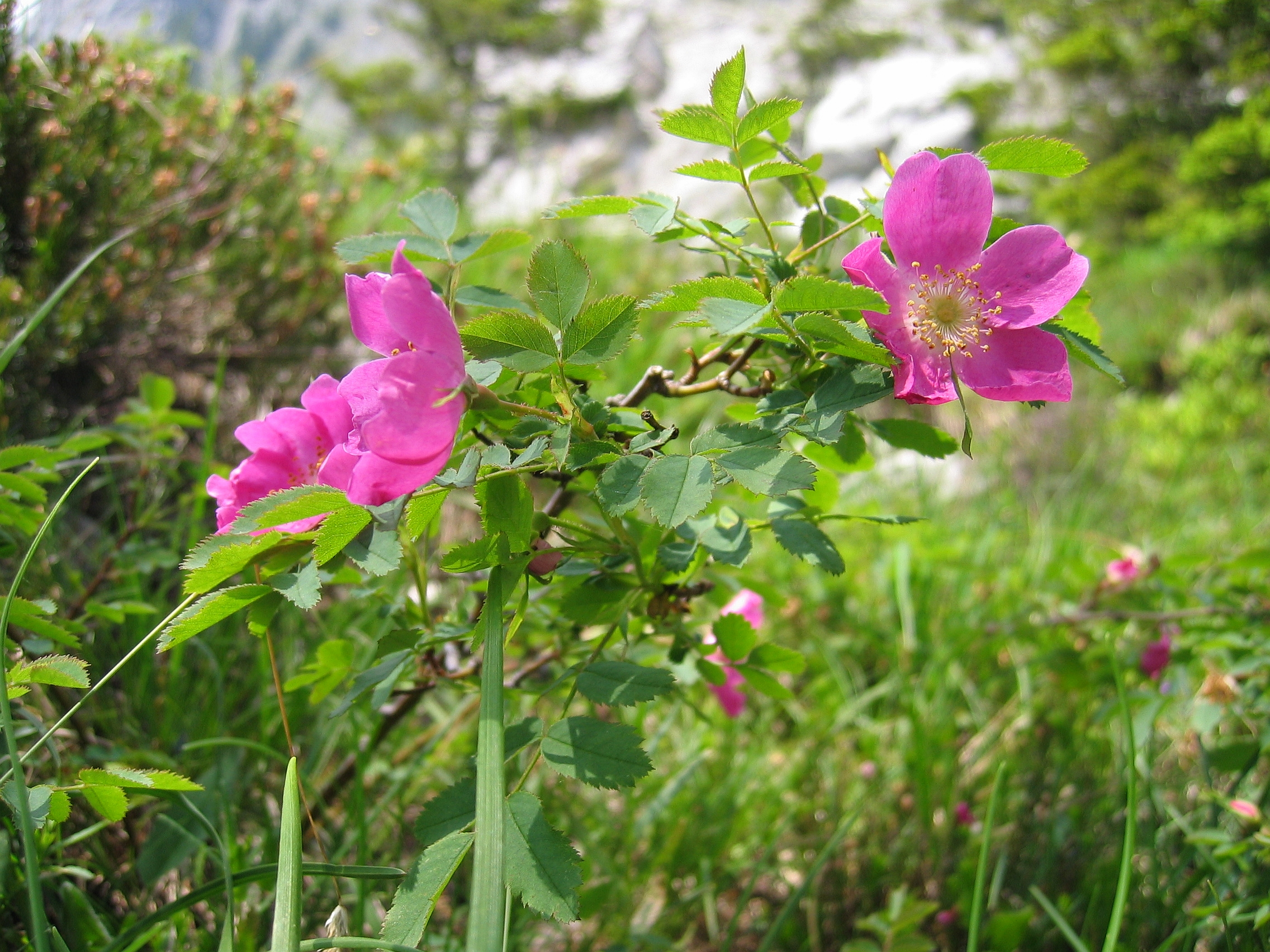
Alpine wild rose.

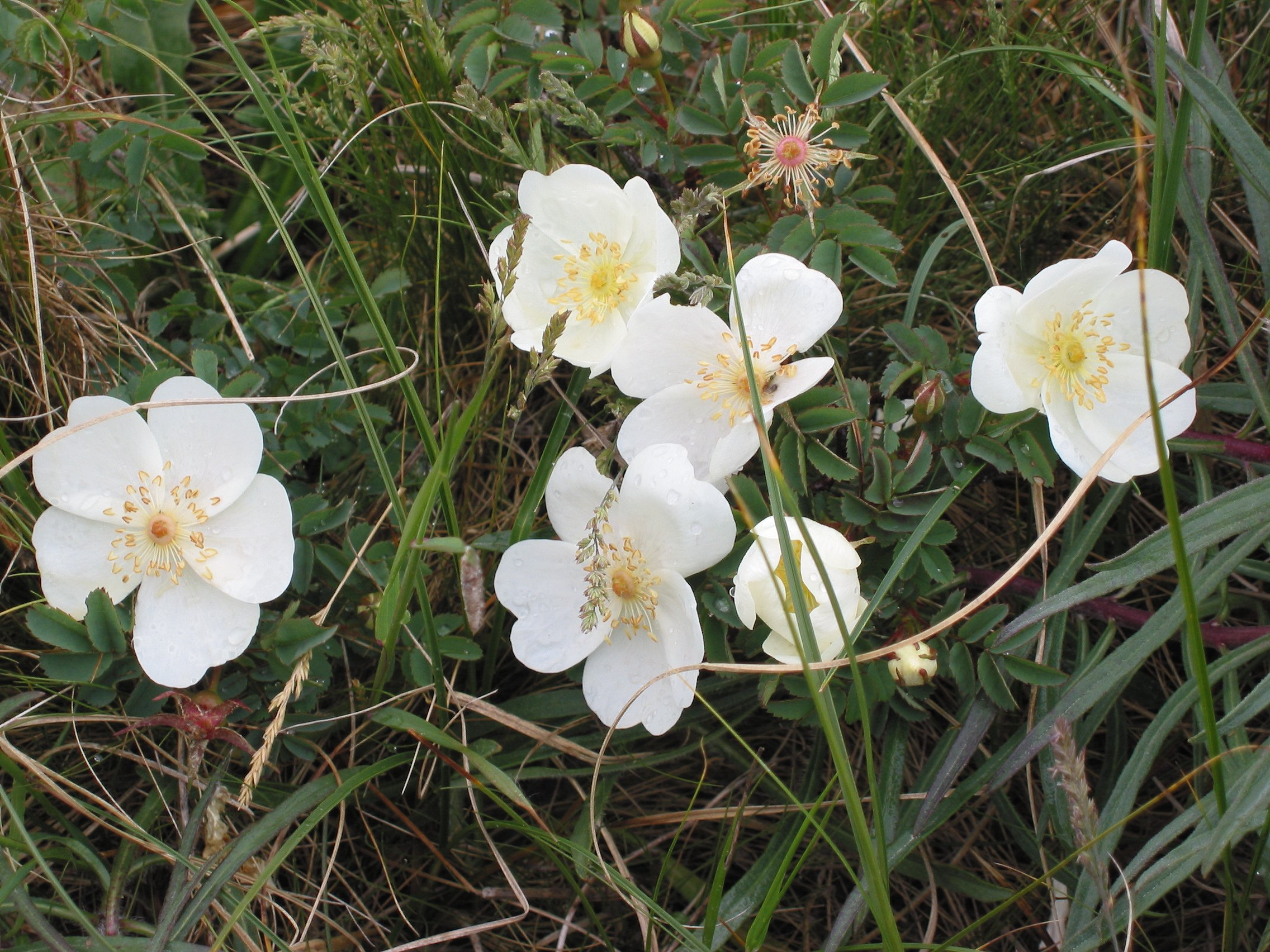
Pimprenelle rose.

In September, the flowering of the field gentian (Gentianella campestris), (Note: Gentianella campestris is also found on the ridges) a low-growing plant, can be observed. In some meadows with a particular type of grass, the leafy lousewort (Pedicularis foliosa) and alpine bartsia (Bartsia alpina) can be observed. Additionally, colonies of globeflower (Trollius europaeus) with golden globe-shaped flowers are present. On south-facing slopes, steep meadows host the alpine leek (Allium victorialis). The great burnet (Sanguisorba officinalis) with blood-red flowers is also observed.

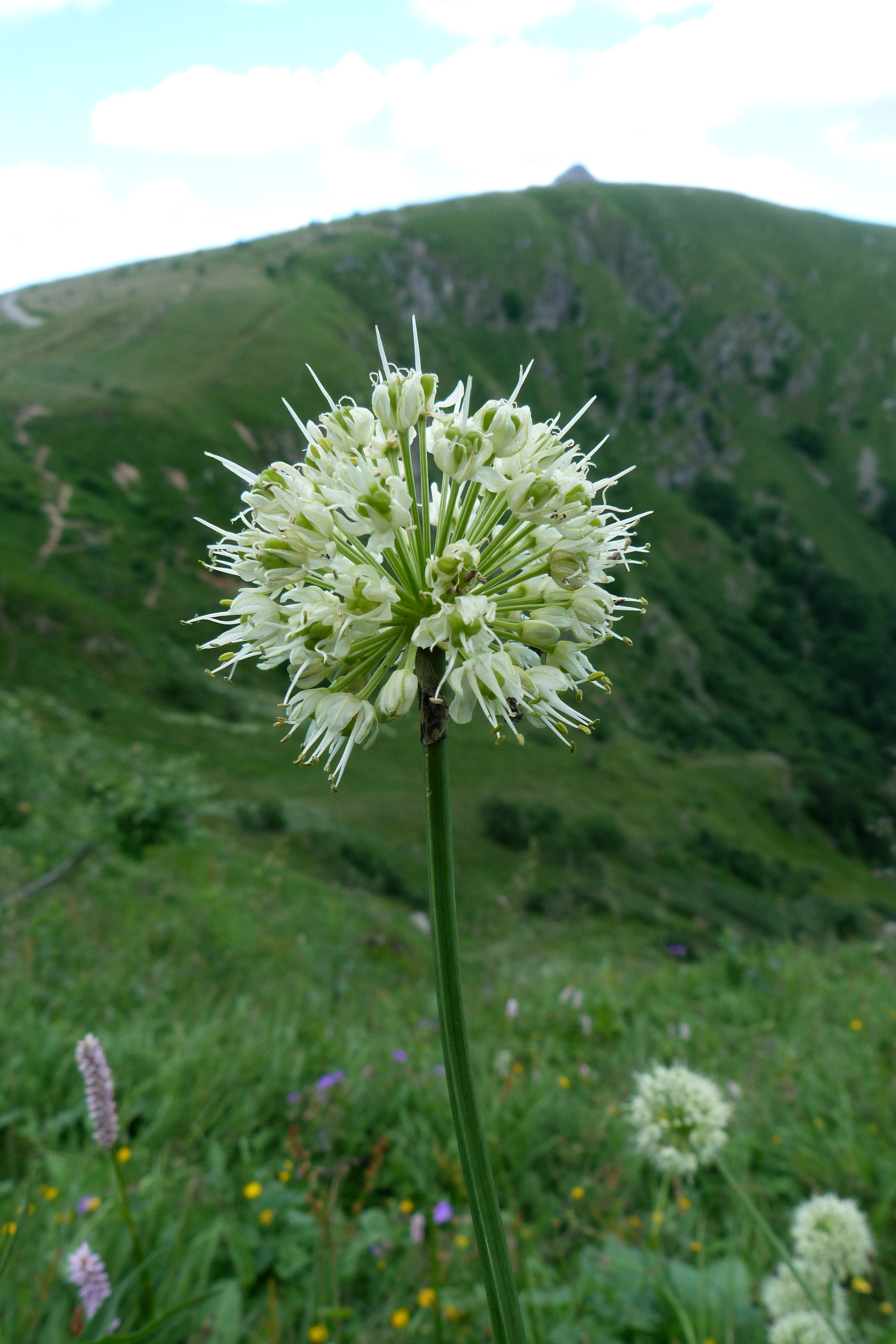
Alpine leek, Wormspel cirque.

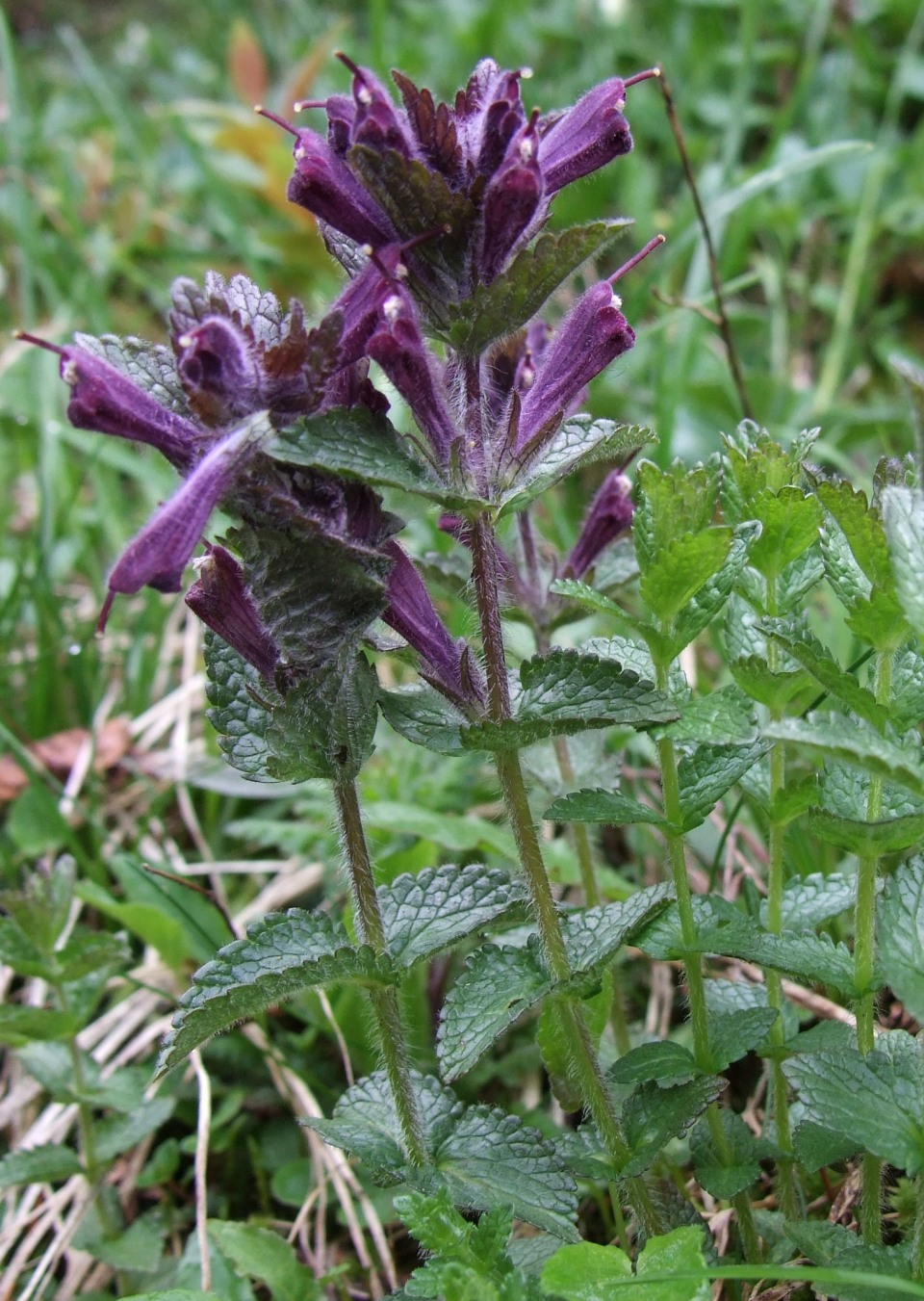
Alpine bartsia.

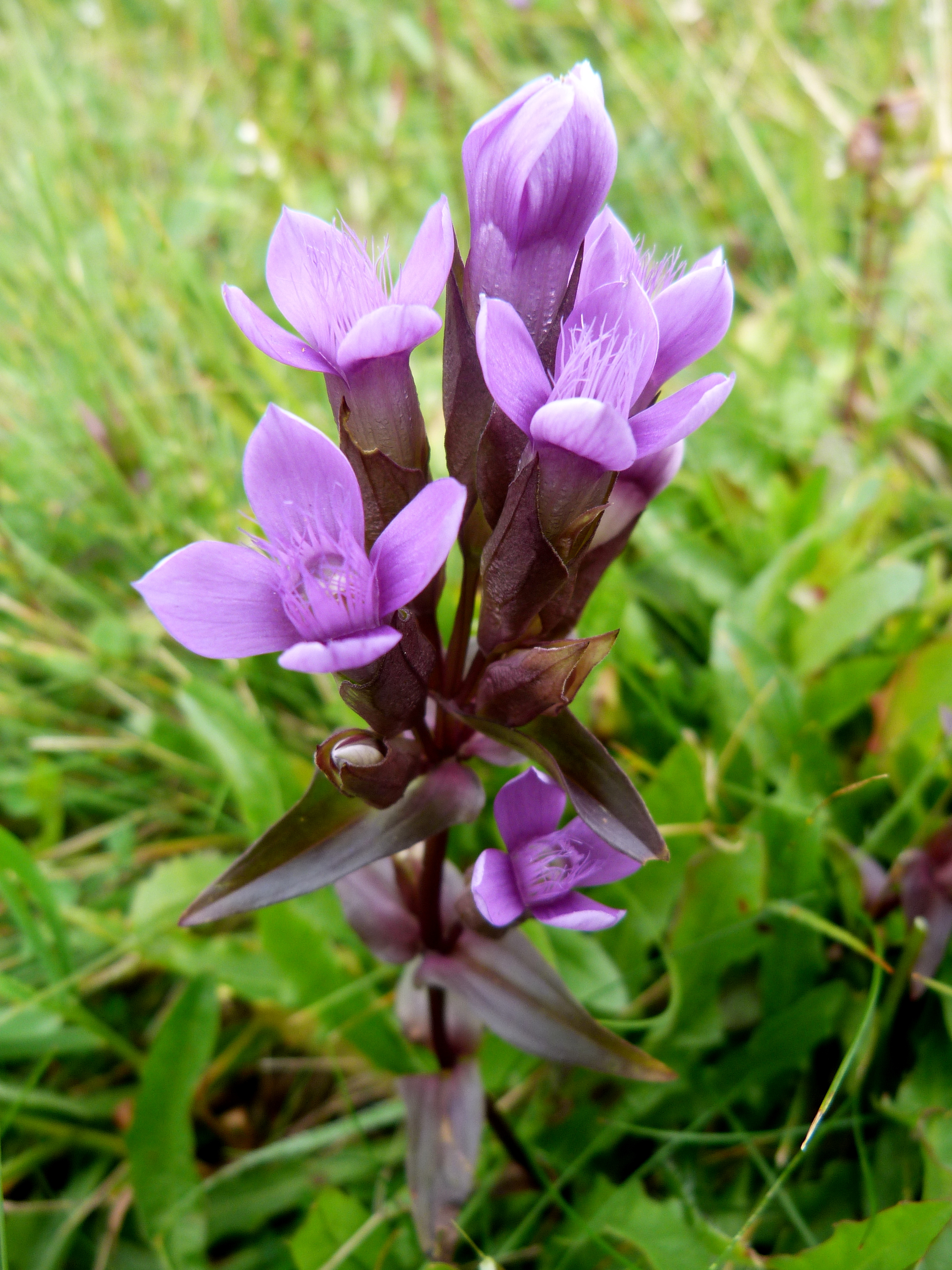
Field gentian near Breitfirst.

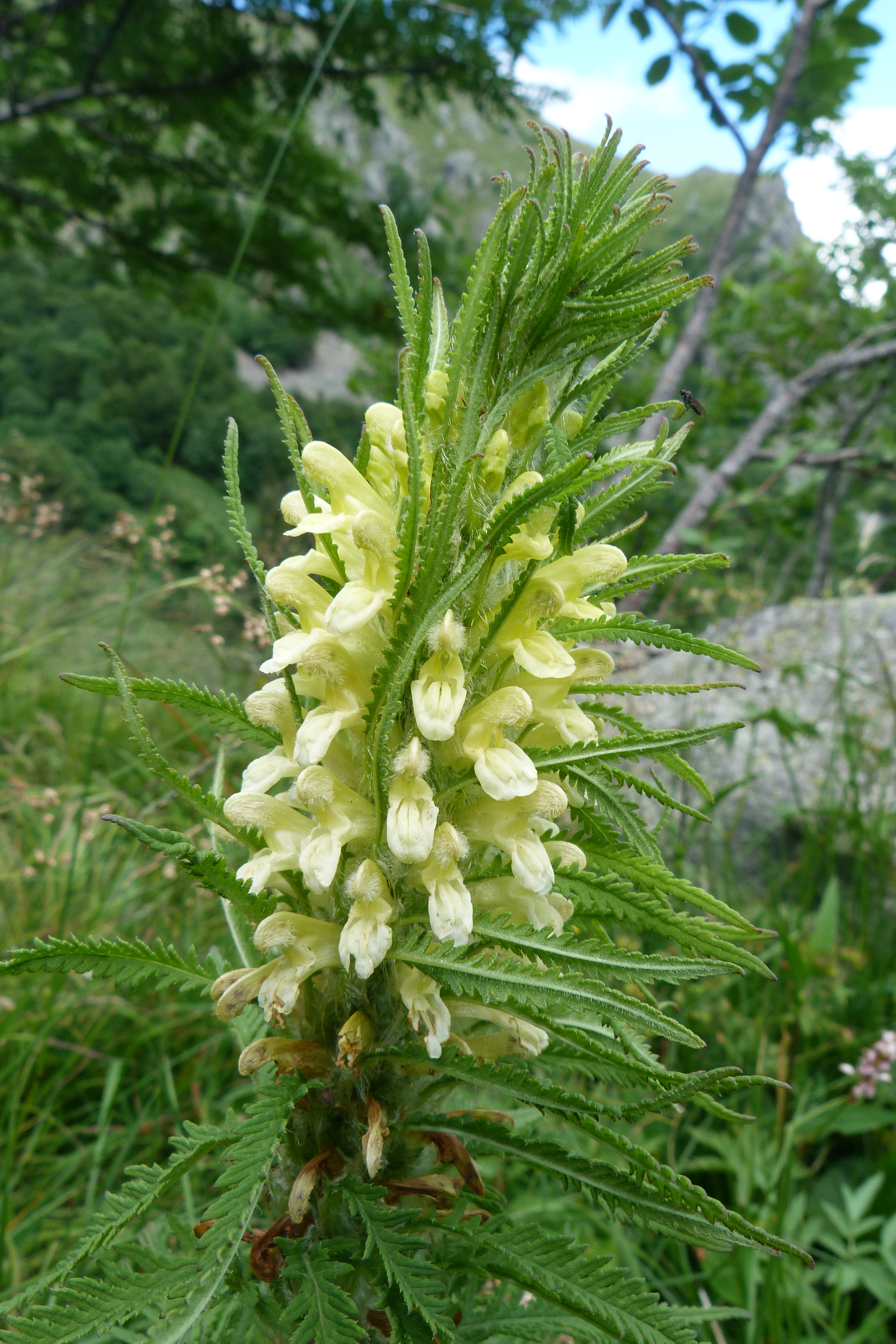
Leafy lousewort, Wormspel cirque.

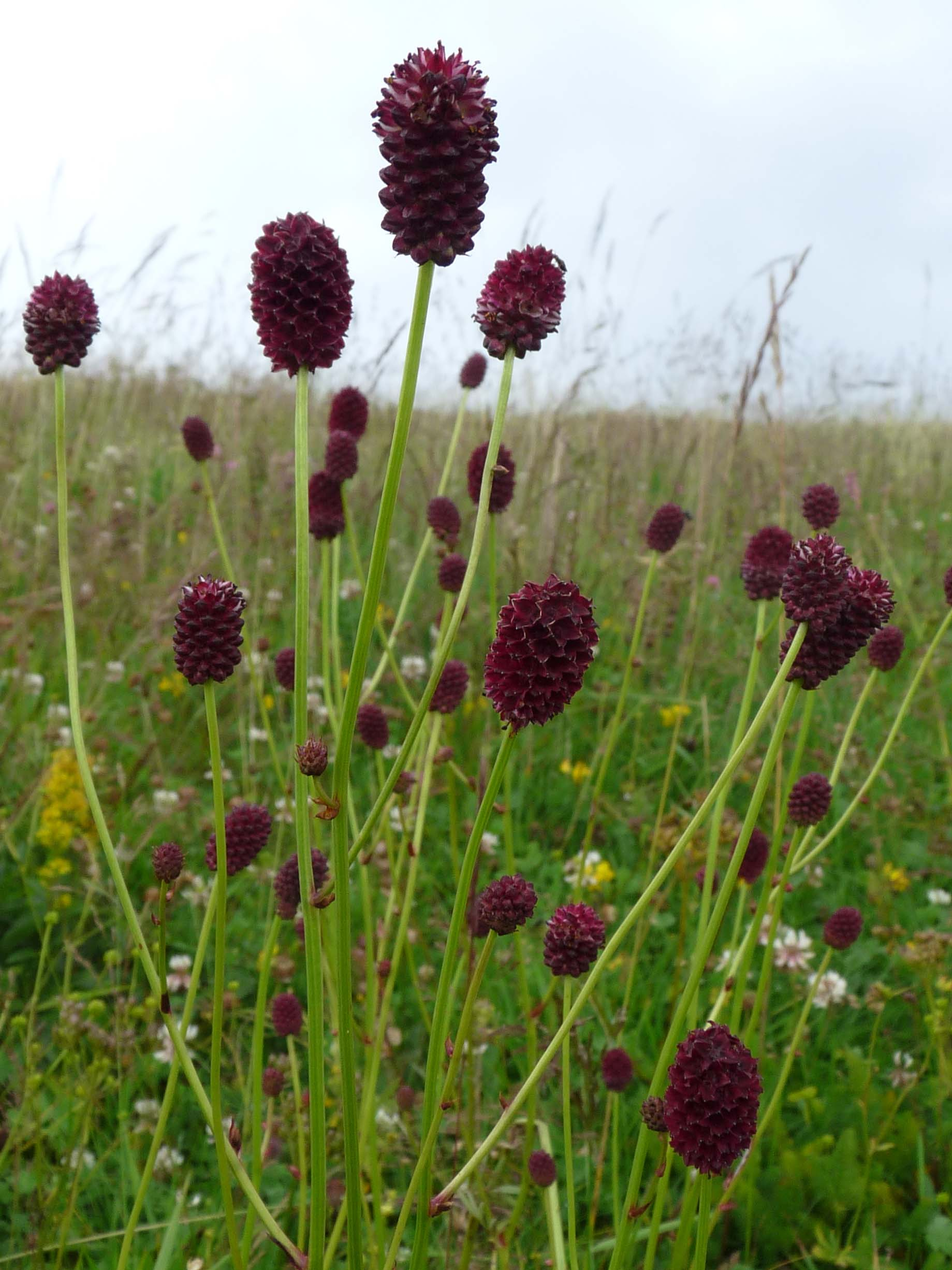
Great burnet, Kastelberg.

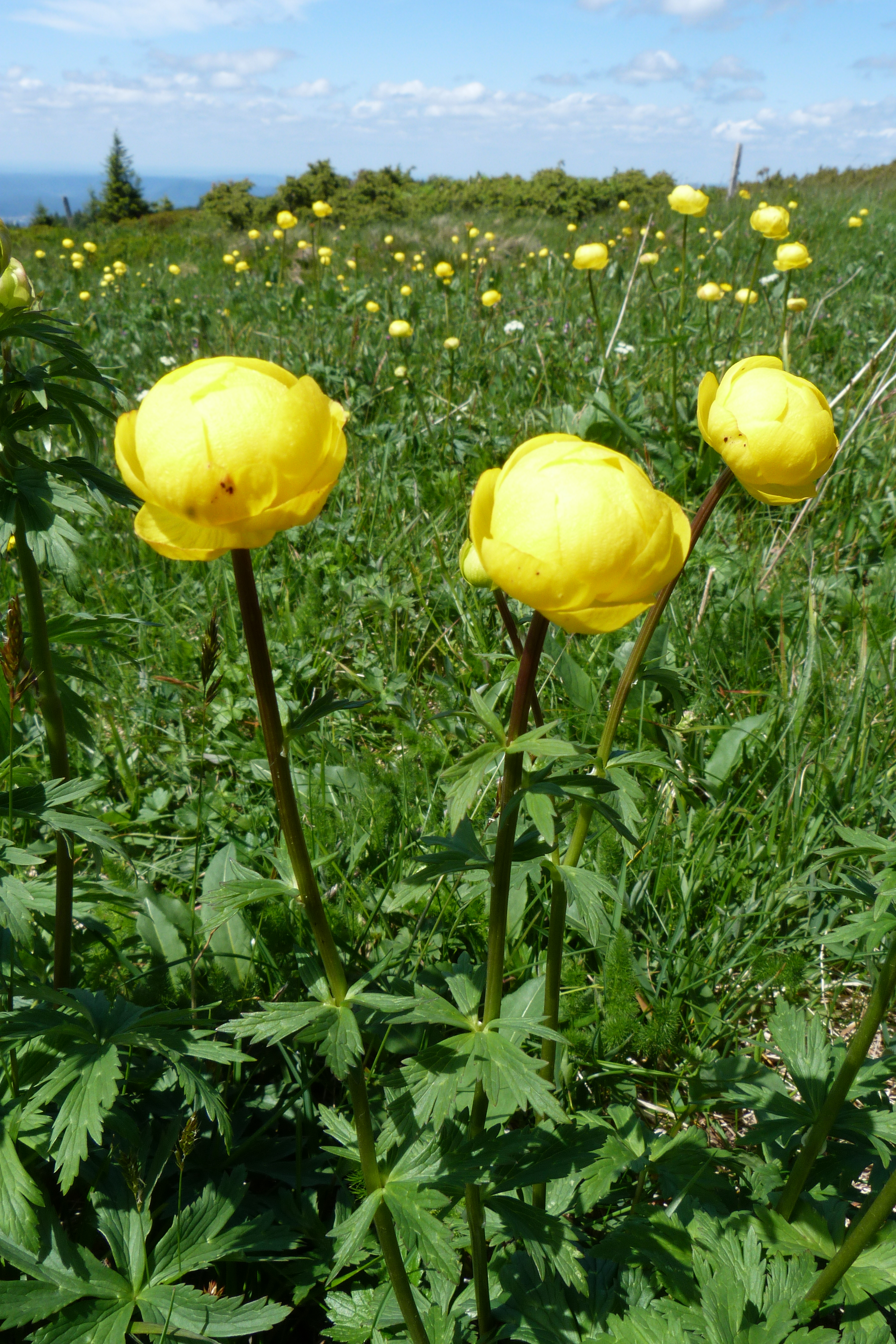
Globeflower, Gazon du Faing.

==== Rocky escarpments ====
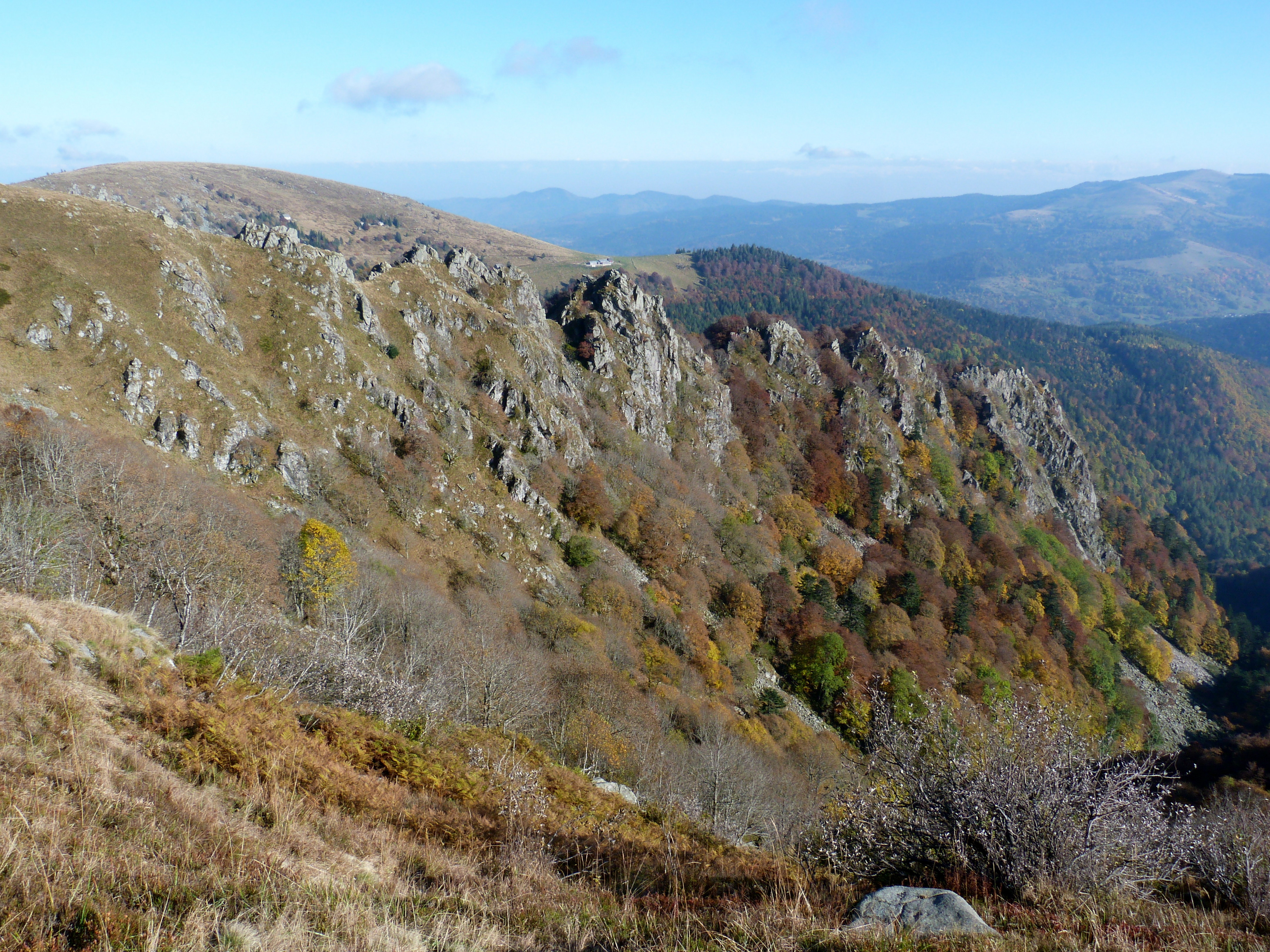
The Spitzkoepfe ridge.

The Vosges massif is characterized by a multitude of rocky escarpments, the majority of which are situated in the southern region of the massif. Amongst these, the most notable include the Spitzkoepfe, the Wurzelstein located to the north of the Col de la Schlucht, the Martinswand in the Hohneck massif, and the area traversed by the Sentier des Roches.

The flora in these environments is capable of enduring extreme conditions, including intense sunlight and relative summer dryness, as well as very low winter temperatures.

Various succulent plants can be found there, such as annual stonecrop (Sedum annuum), alpine stonecrop (Sedum alpestre), dark stonecrop (Sedum atratum), rock stonecrop (Sedum rupestre), orpine (Hylotelephium telephium), hairy stonecrop (Sedum villosum), thick-leaved stonecrop (Sedum dasyphyllum), and encrusted saxifrage (Saxifraga paniculata), as well as chasmophytic species capable of colonizing rock crevices like rock campion (Silene rupestris), Jacquin's hawkweed (Hieracium humile), hawkweed (Hieracium intybaceum) with lemon-yellow flowers, rock speedwell (Veronica fruticans), and three-leaved valerian (Valeriana tripteris).

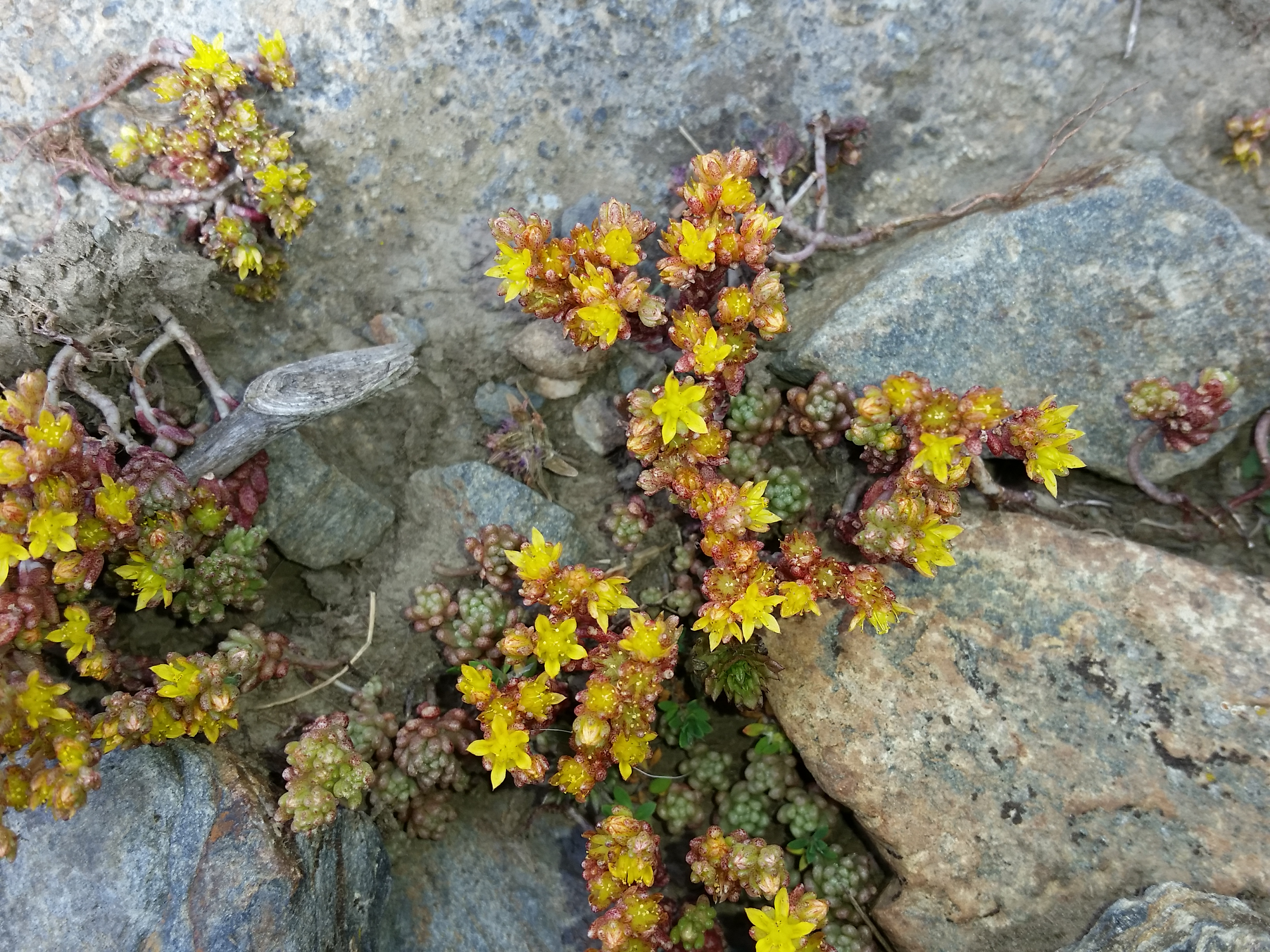
Annual stonecrop.

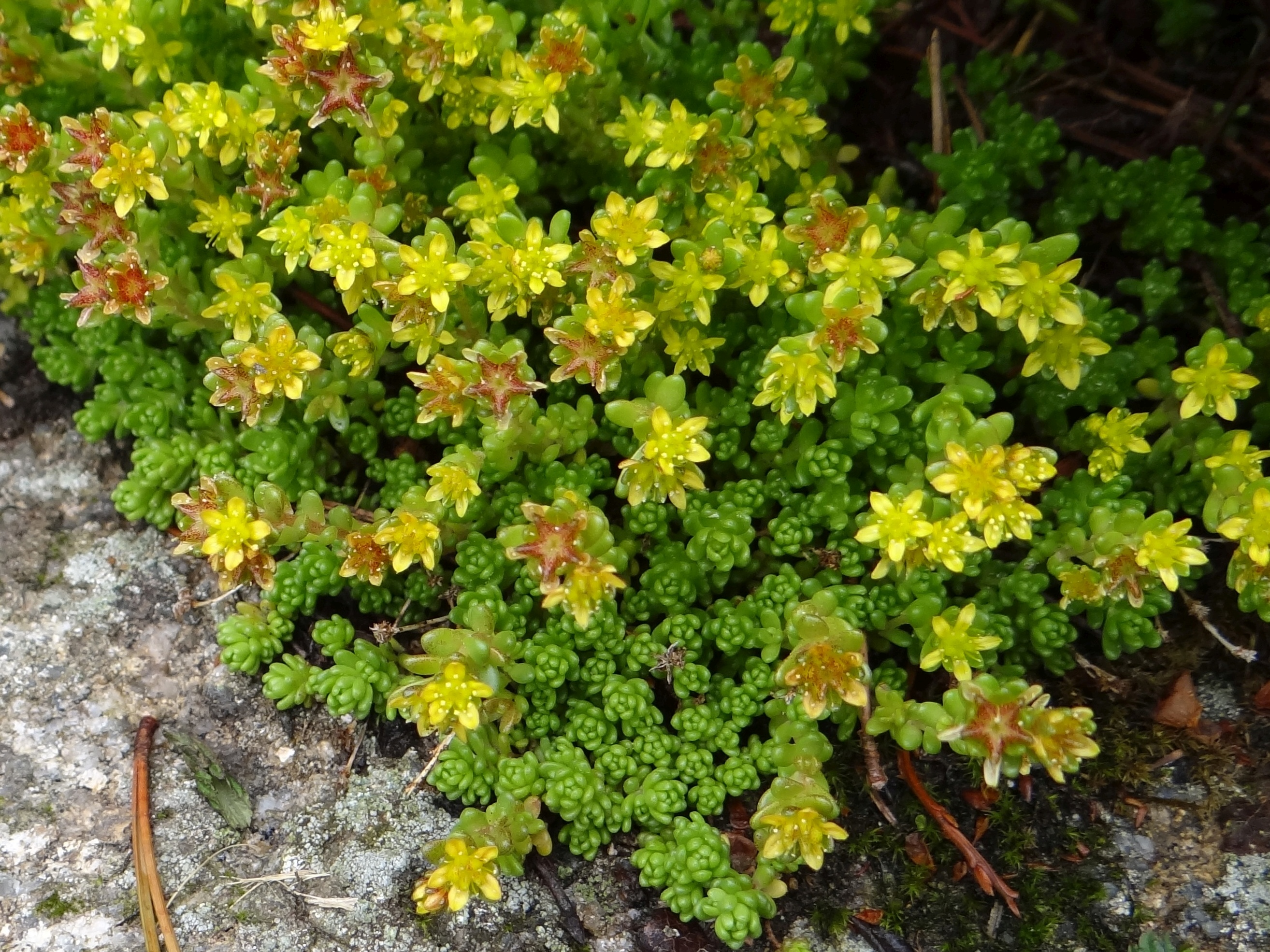
Alpine stonecrop.

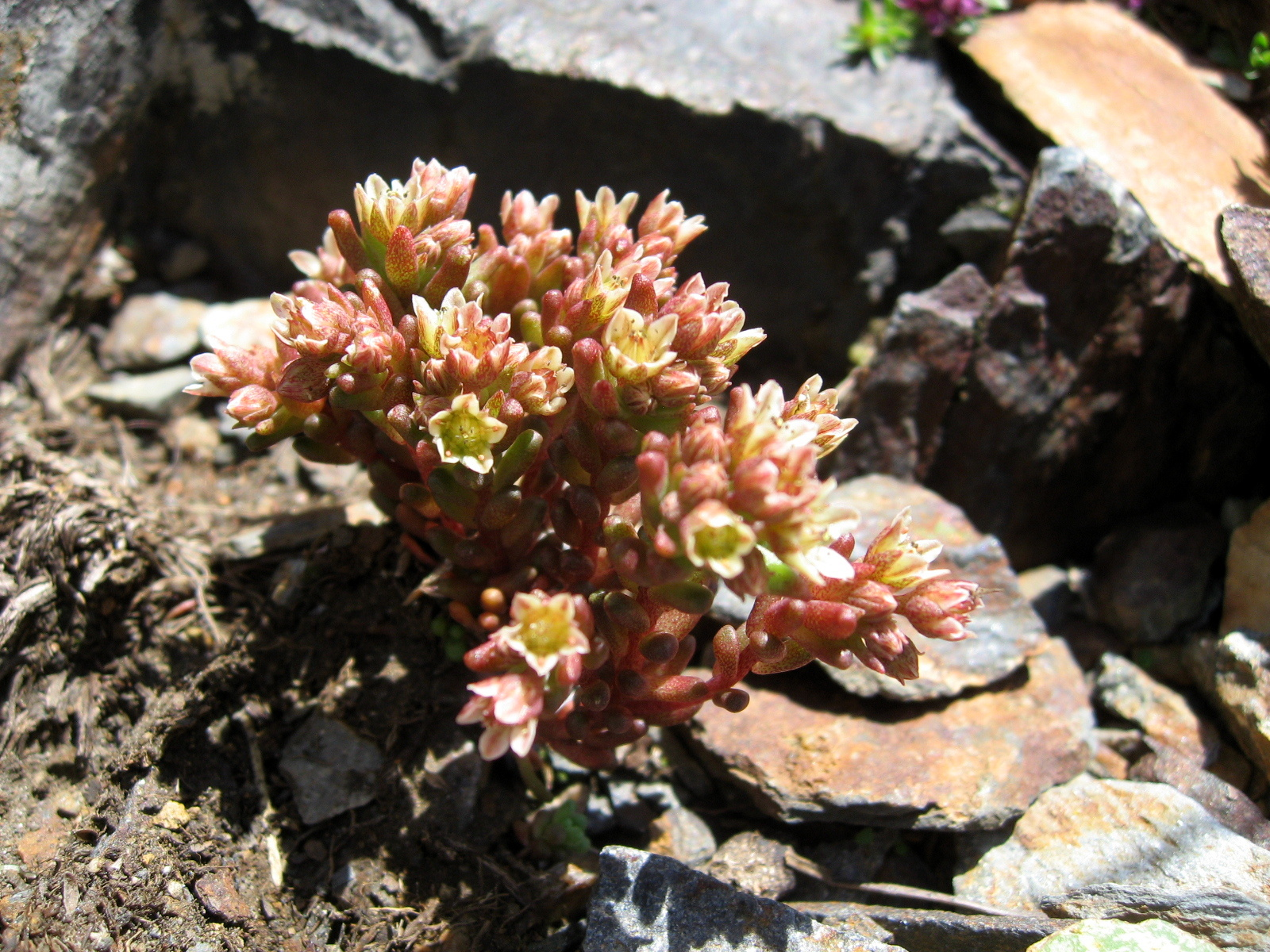
Dark stonecrop.

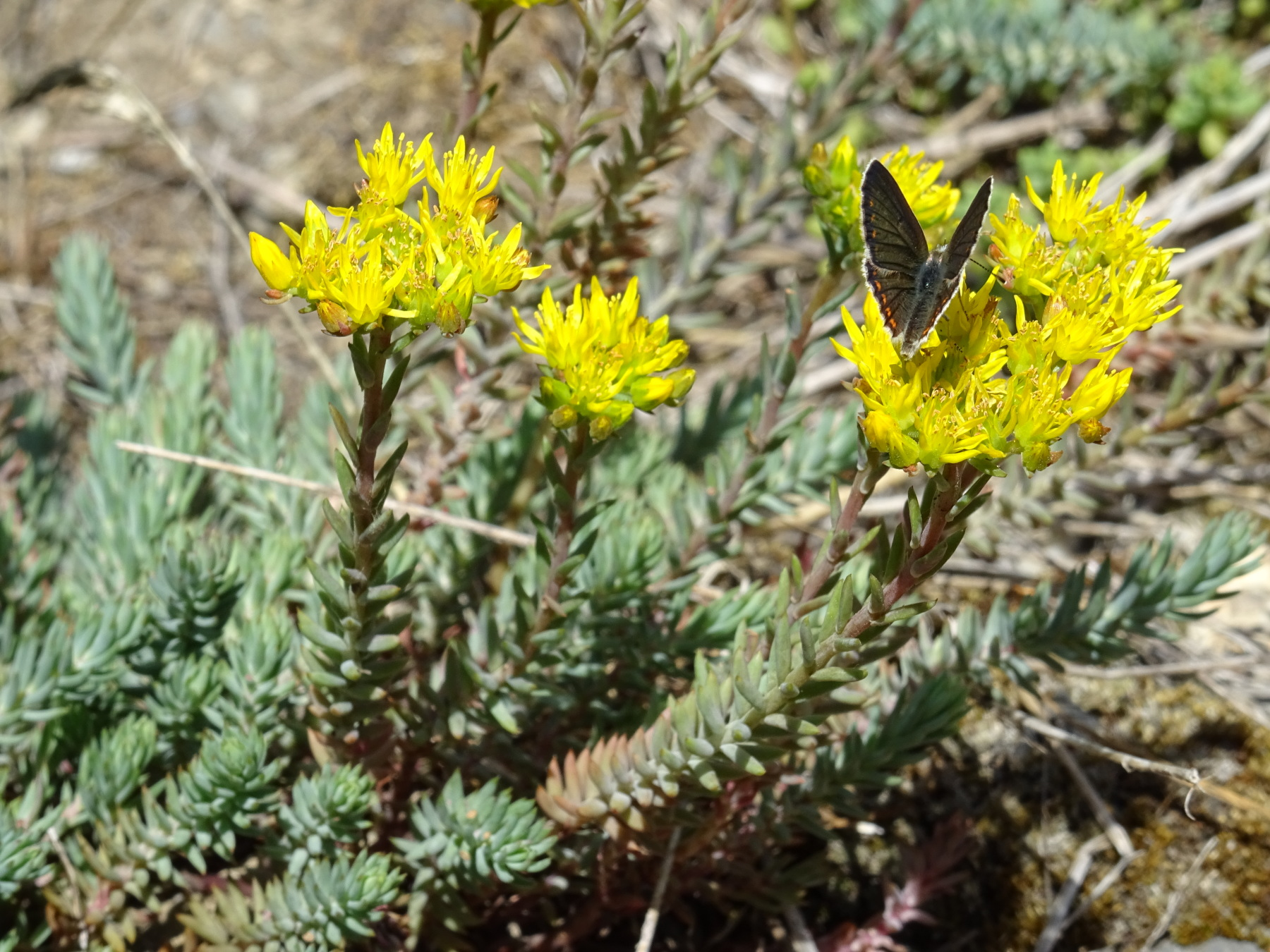
Rock stonecrop.

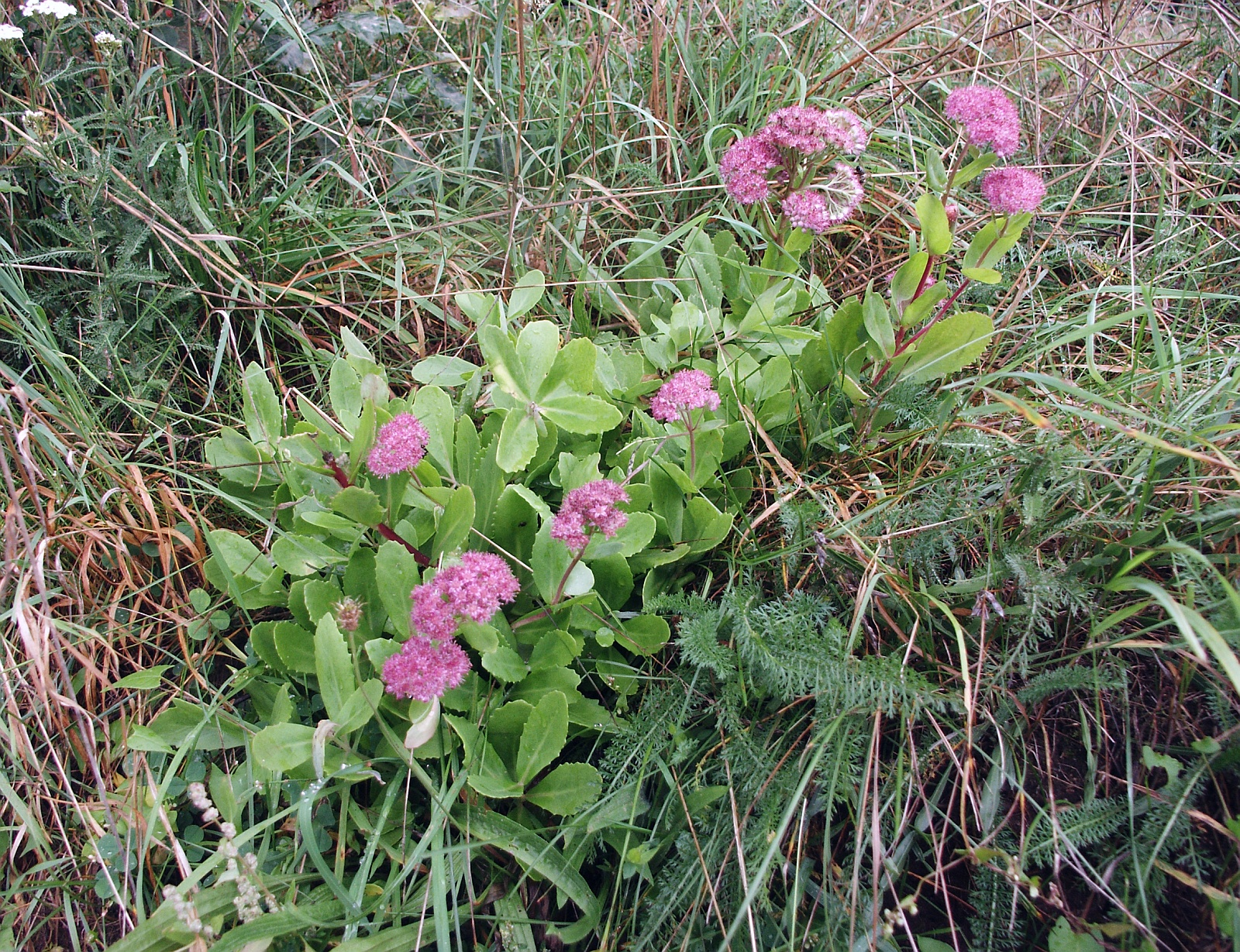
Orpine.

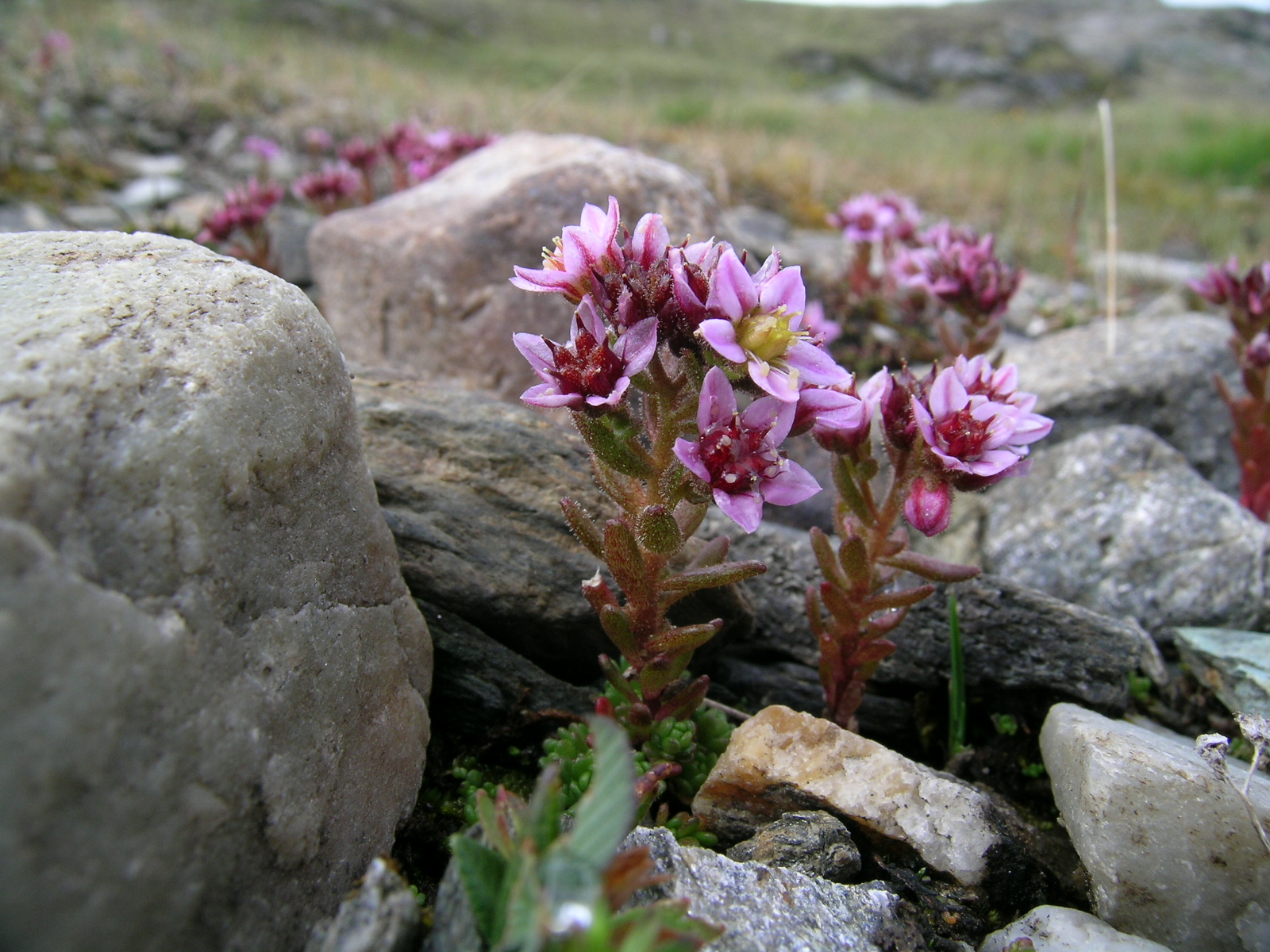
Hairy stonecrop.

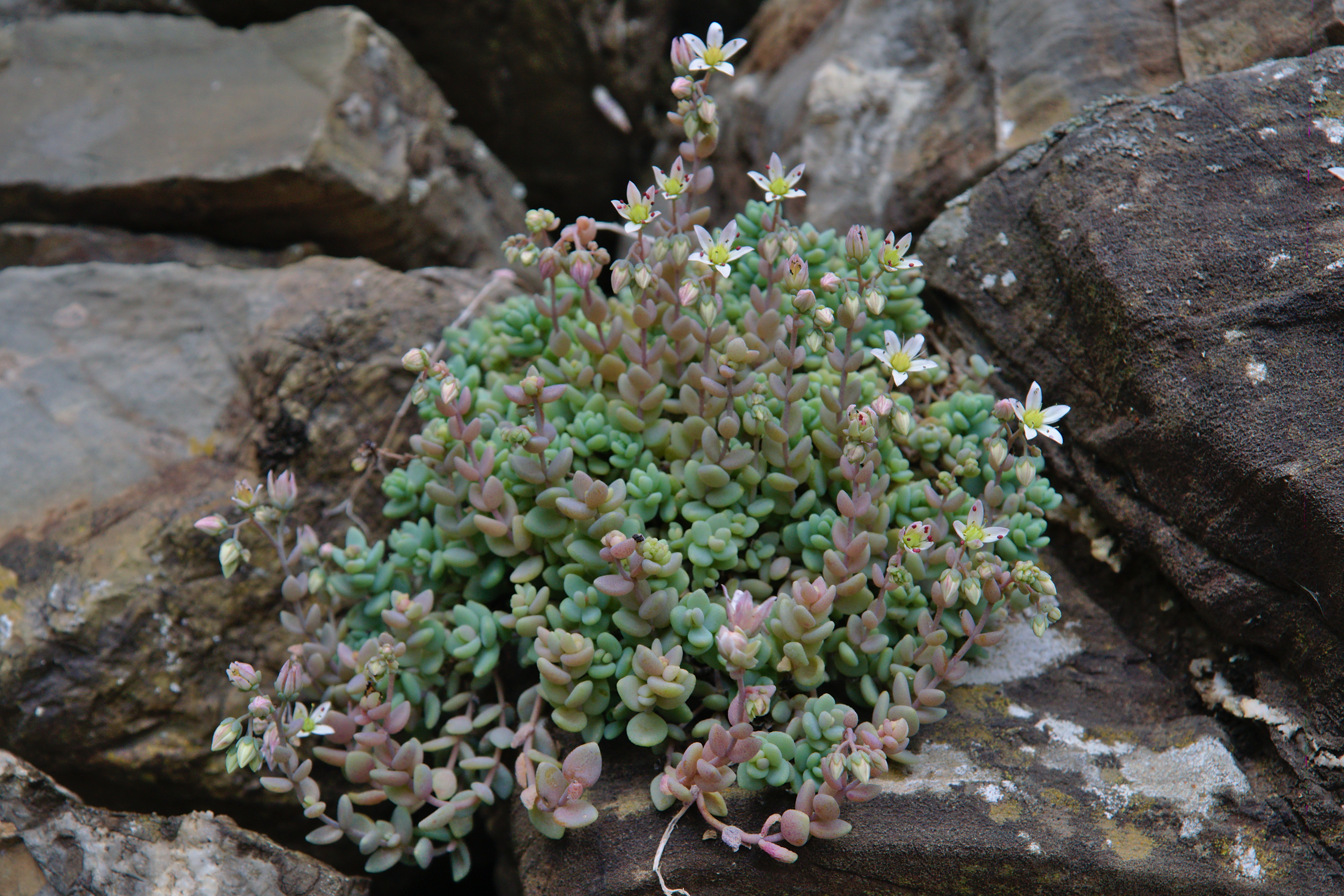
Thick-leaved stonecrop.

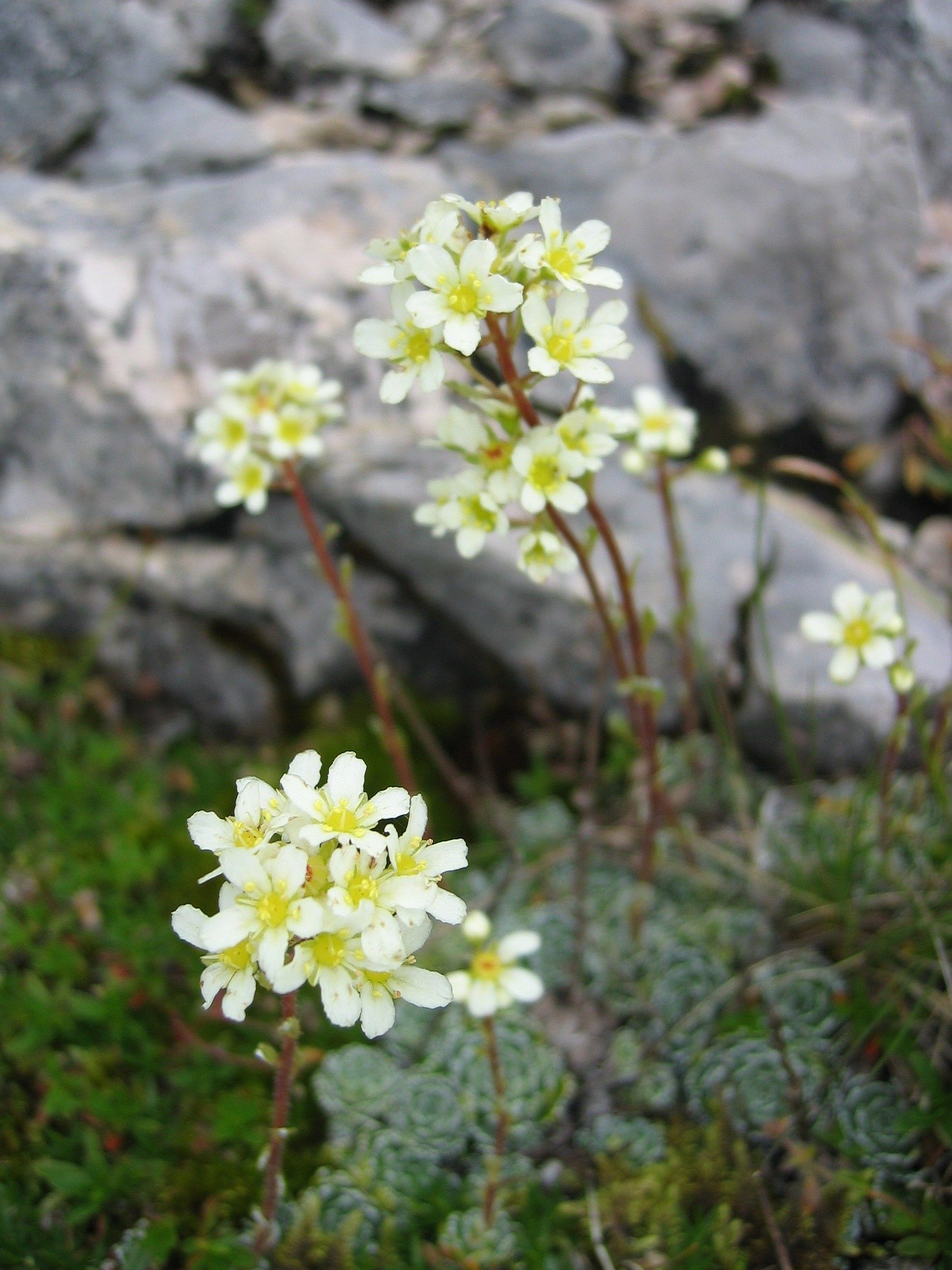
Encrusted saxifrage.
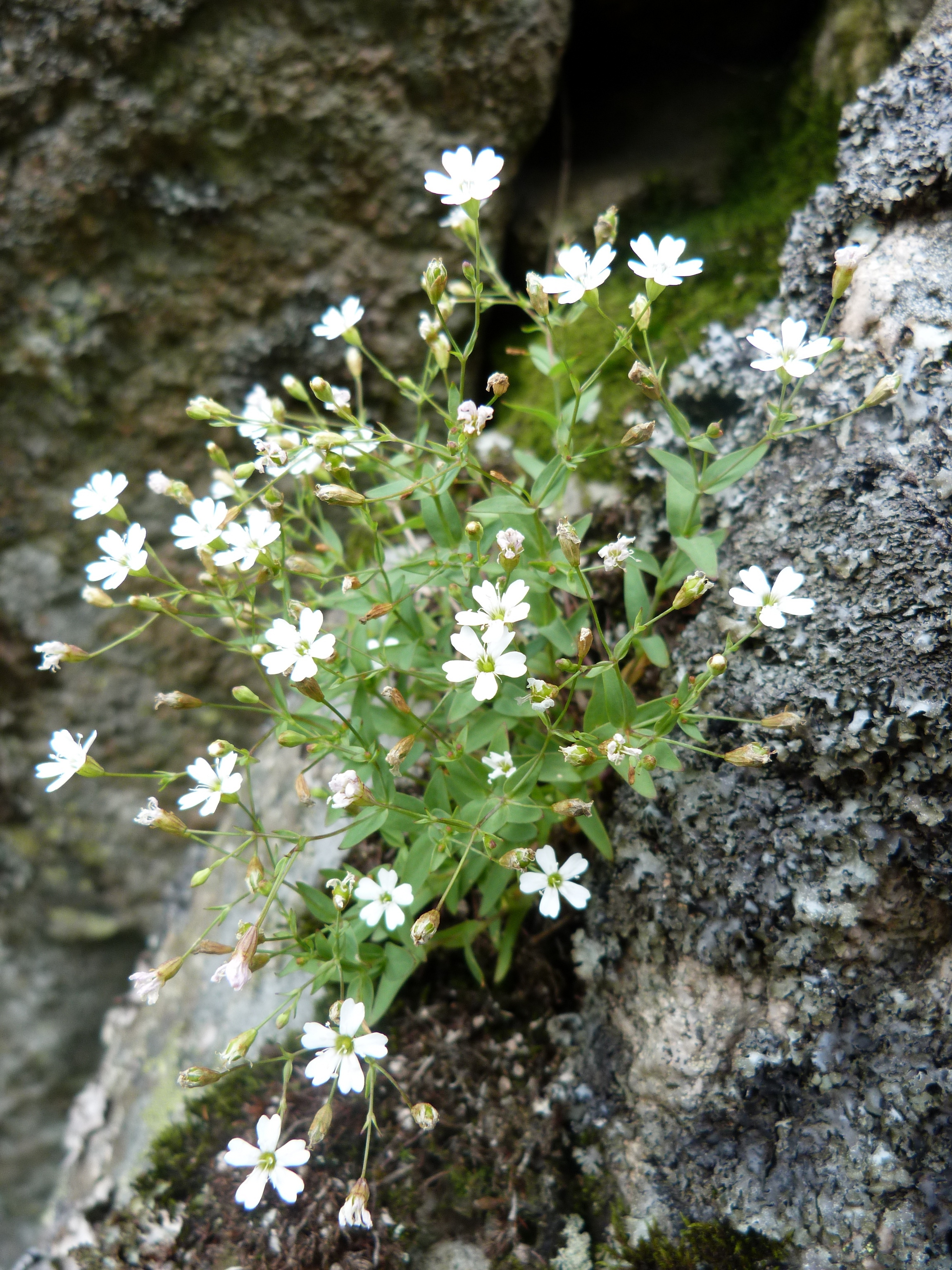
Rock campion in the Spitzkoepfe.

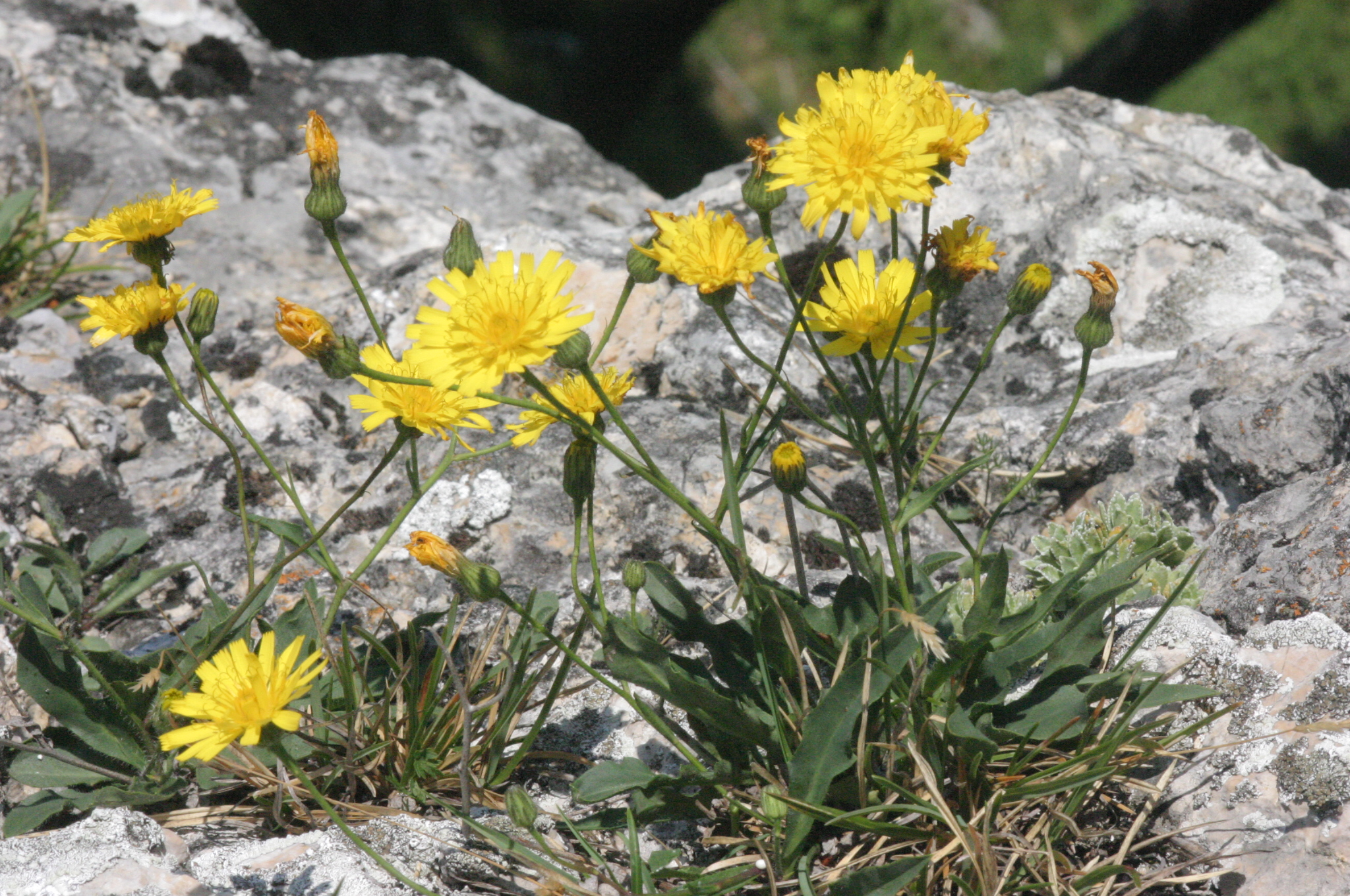
Jacquin's hawkweed.

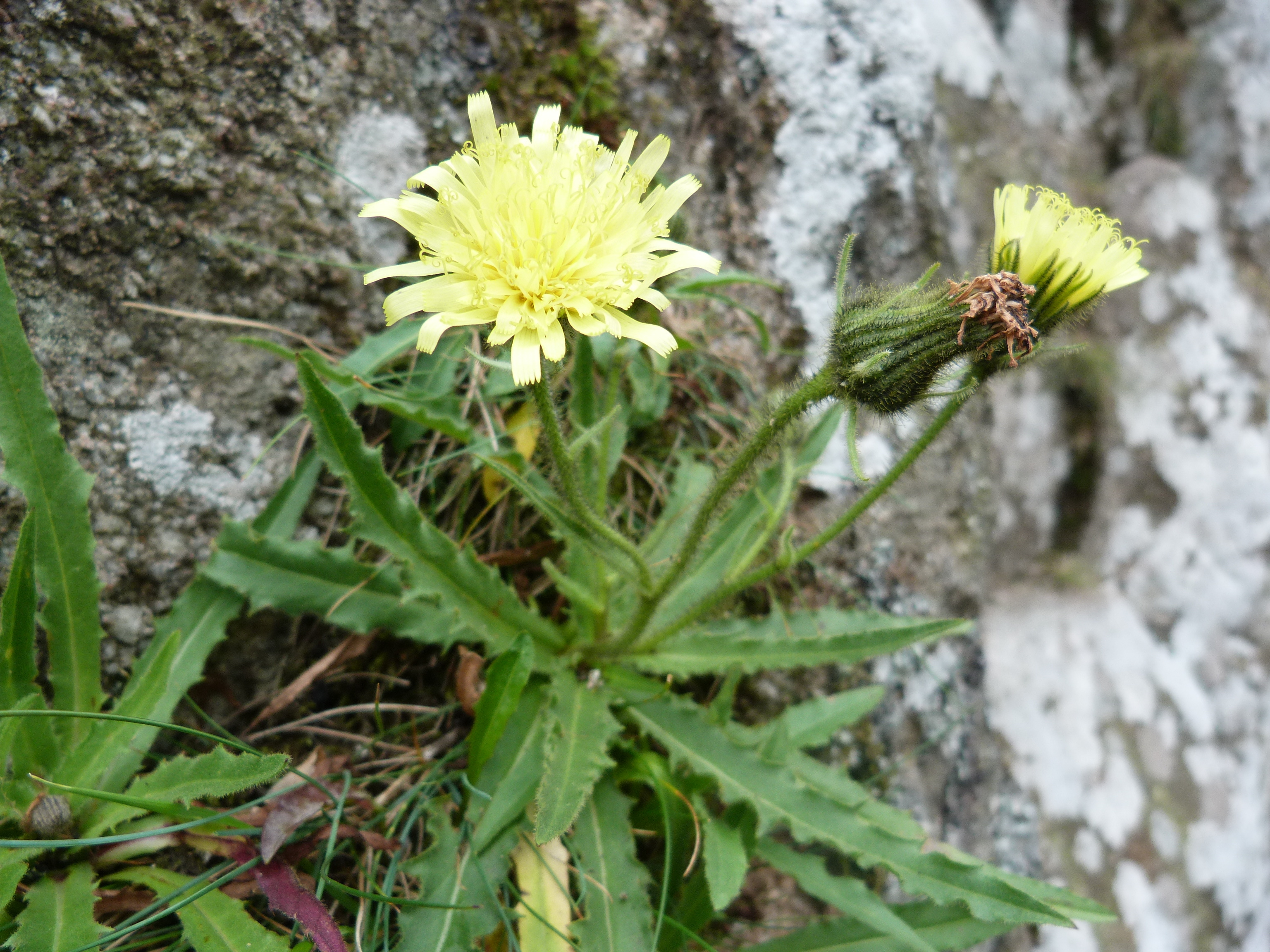
Hawkweed in the Spitzkoepfe.

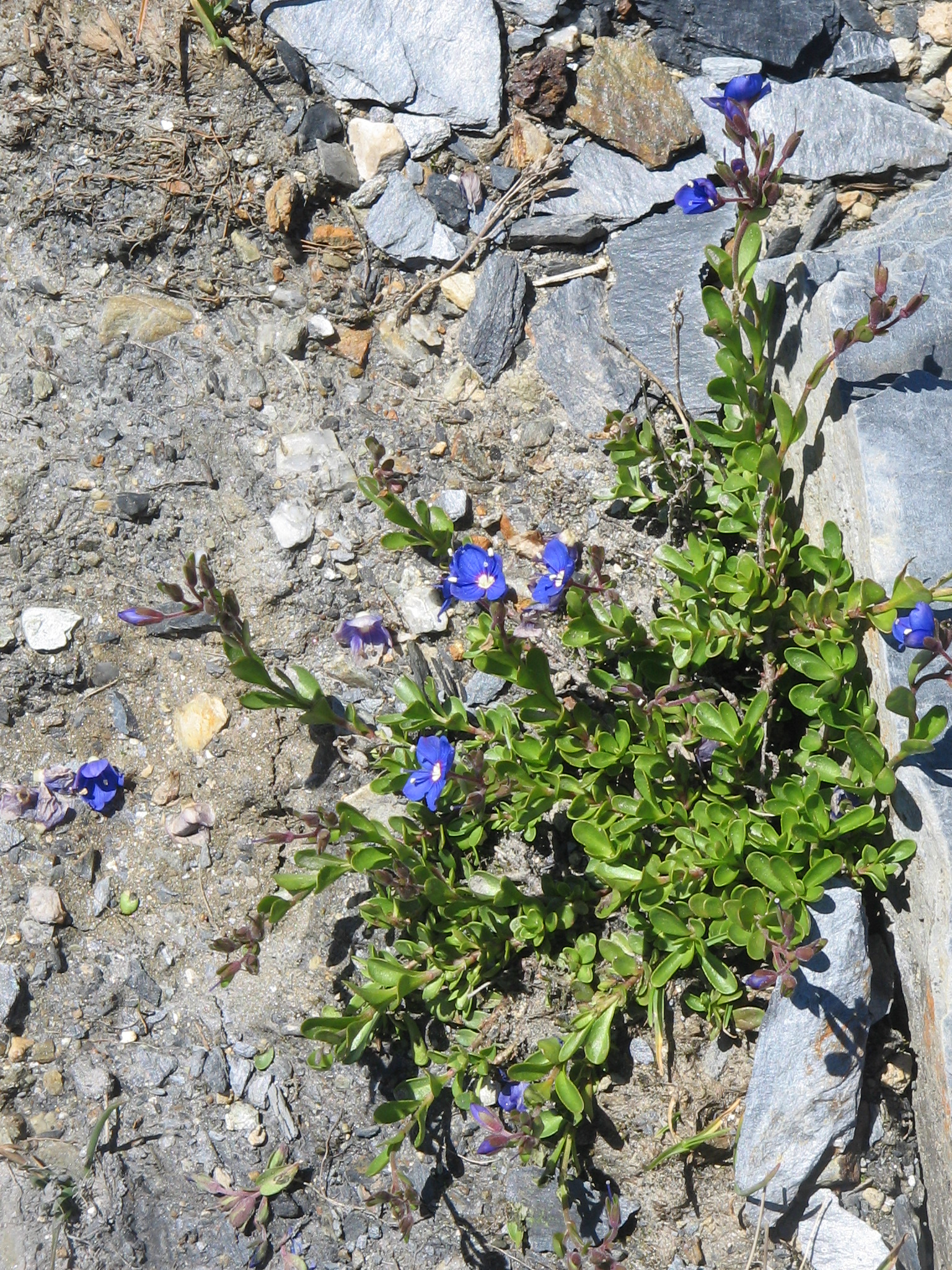
Rock speedwell.

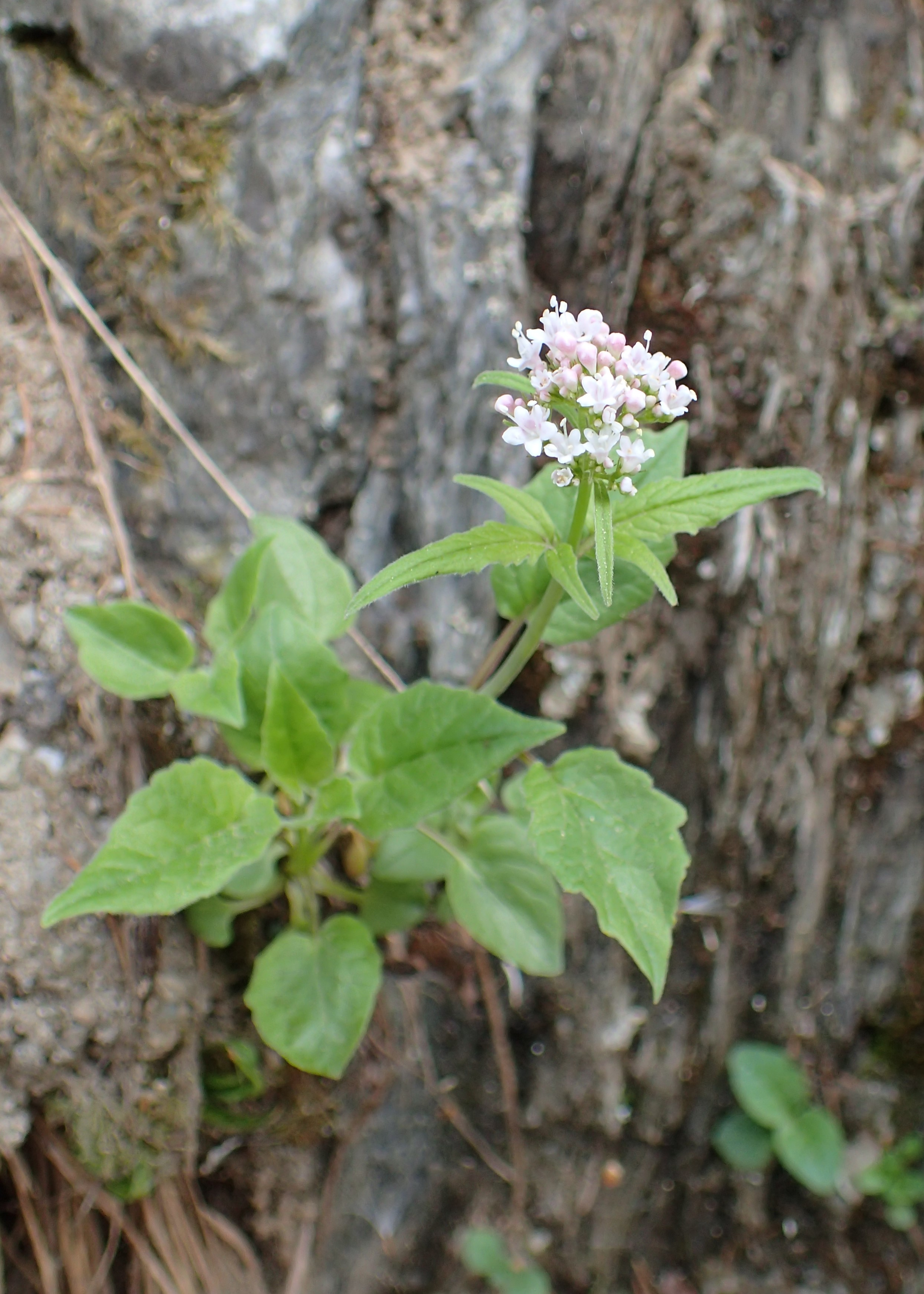
Three-leaved valerian.

These environments also serve as habitats for a diverse array of mosses and ferns, including Cryptogramma crispa, Cystopteris fragilis, and Gymnocarpium dryopteris.

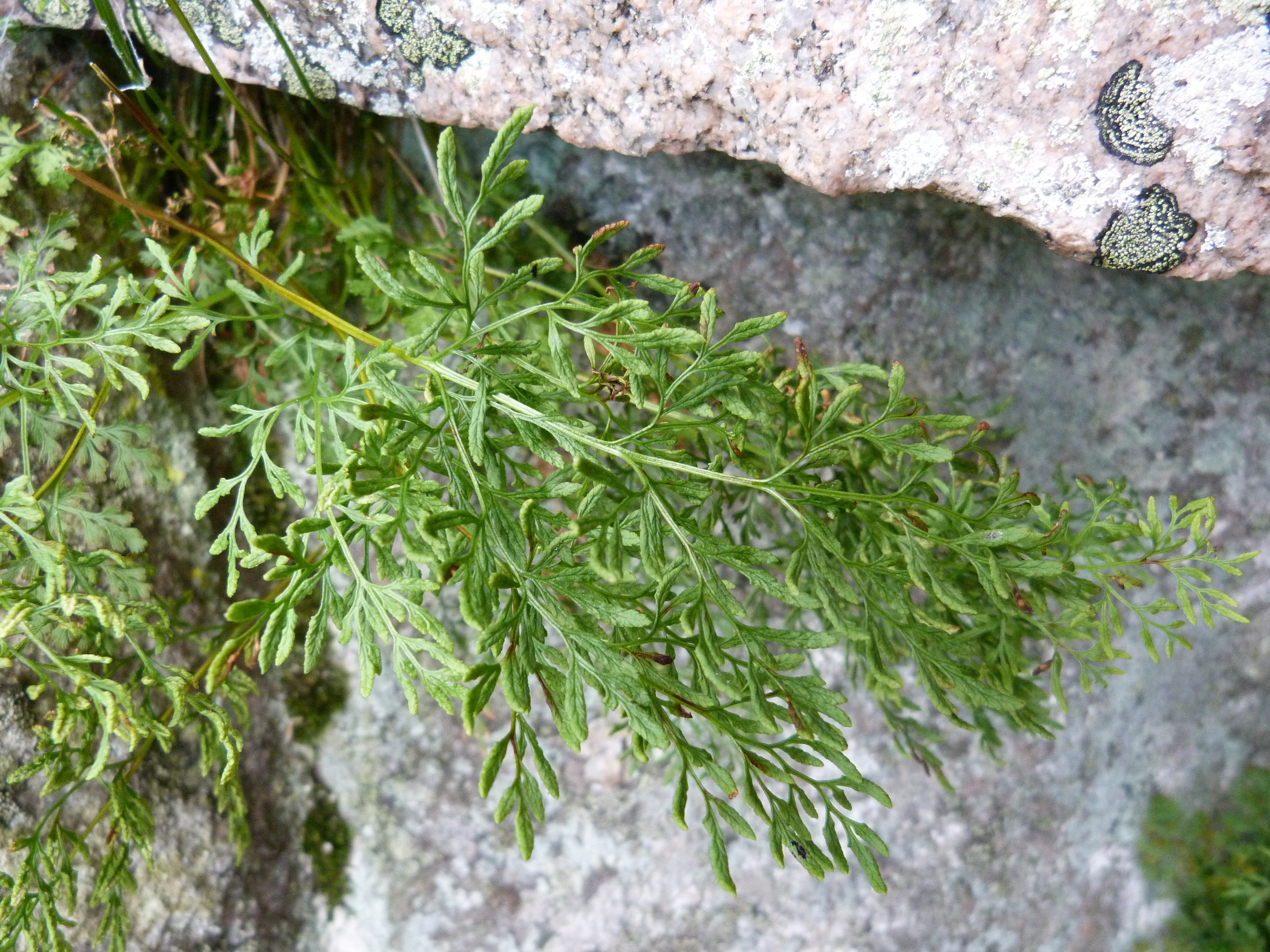
Cryptogramma crispa au Wurzelstein.

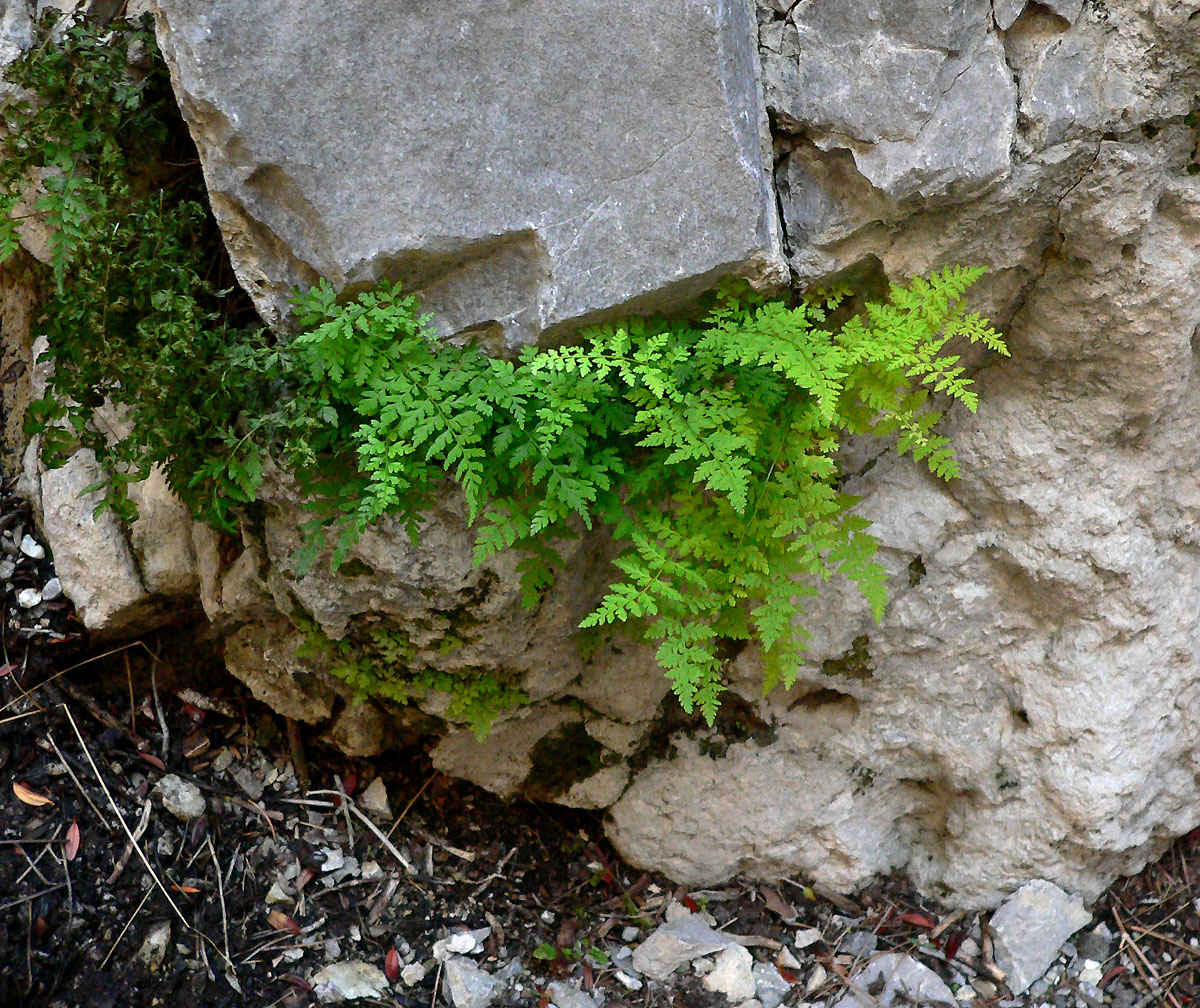
Cystopteris fragilis.

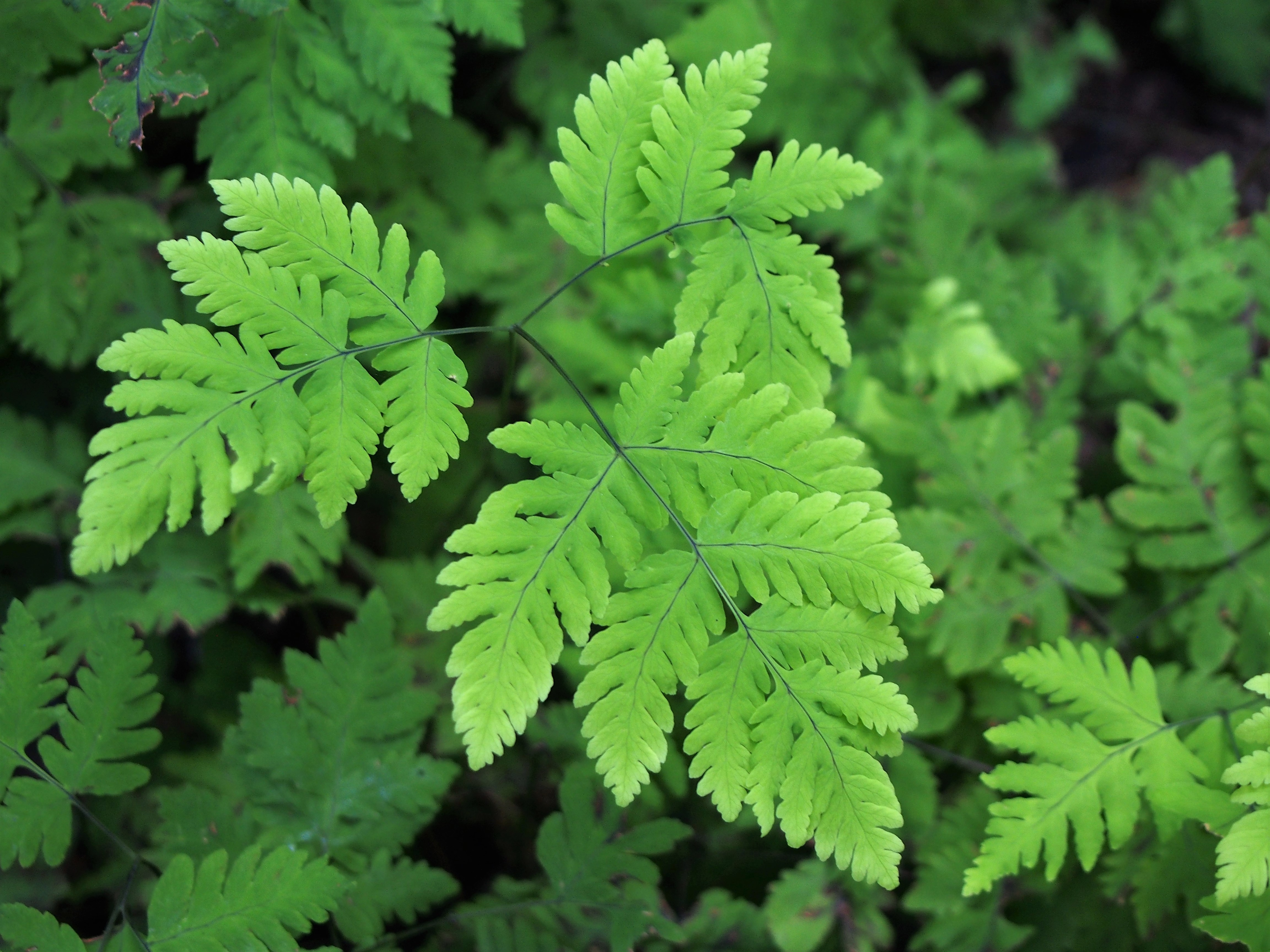
Gymnocarpium dryopteris.

==== Wetlands ====
===== Lakes and streams =====
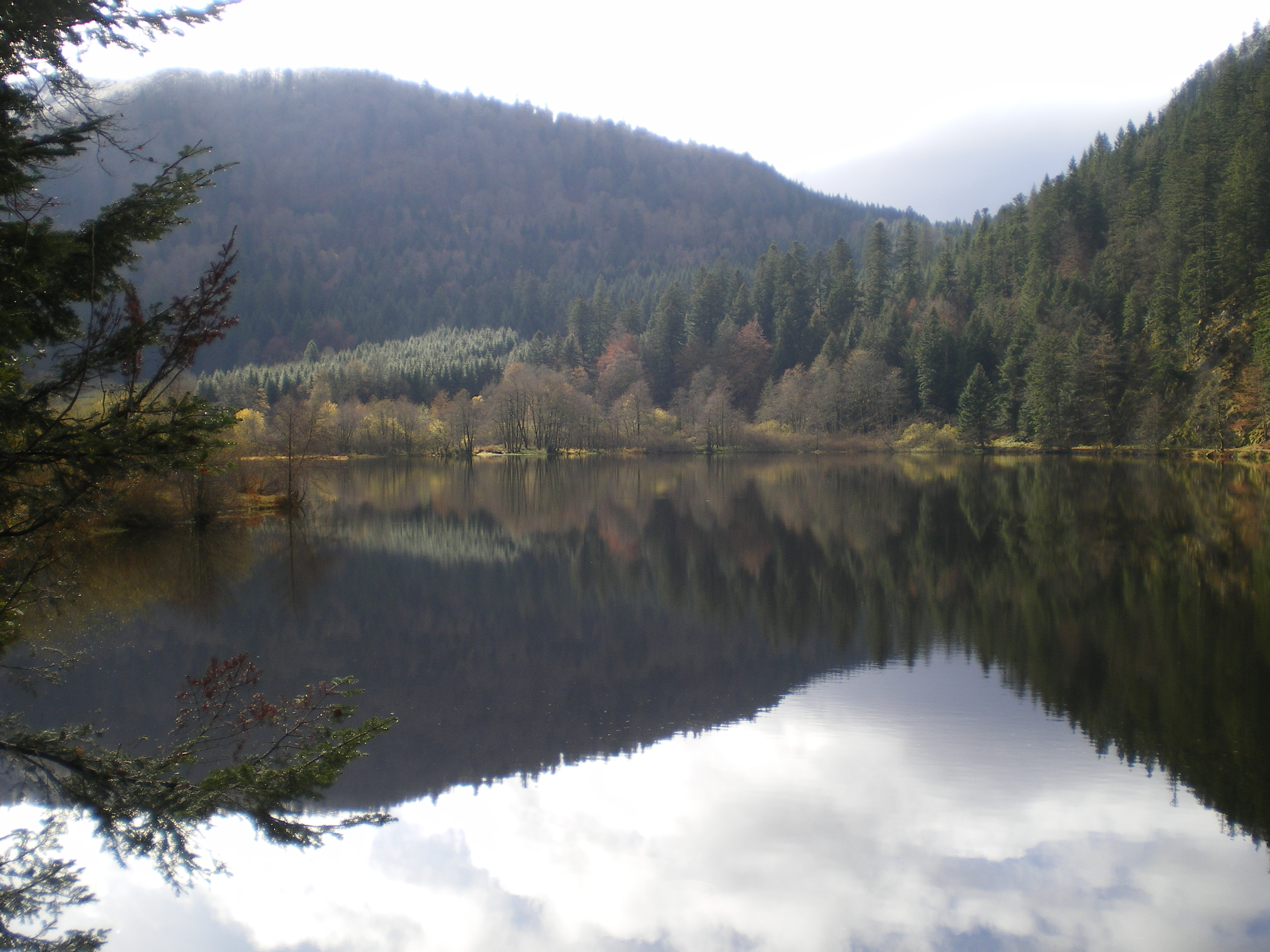
Lake Retournemer .

In the vicinity of certain lakes, including Lake Retournemer and Lake Longemer, an exceptionally uncommon alder swamp can be observed. The roots of the black alder (Alnus glutinosa) can penetrate deeply into the banks due to their submerged position in the water. The shores of the lakes are home to the yellow iris (Iris pseudacorus), which flowers in June and is characterized by yellow blooms. In areas of high precipitation along streams, one can find meadowsweet (Filipendula ulmaria), marsh marigold (Caltha palustris) with its golden-yellow flowers, aconite-leaved buttercup (Ranunculus aconitifolius) with its small white flowers perched on tall stems, perennial honesty (Lunaria rediviva), which can be identified by its small mauve flowers with four petals and its very flat, oval fruits. The wood cranesbill (Geranium sylvaticum) is distinguished by its elegant violet flowers with five petals, while the goat's beard (Aruncus dioicus) is notable for its spectacular small white flowers in large panicles. Less frequently observed are the globeflower (Trollius europaeus), wild garlic (Allium ursinum), and touch-me-not balsam or yellow balsam (Impatiens noli-tangere), which are characterized by mature fruits that explode violently when touched.

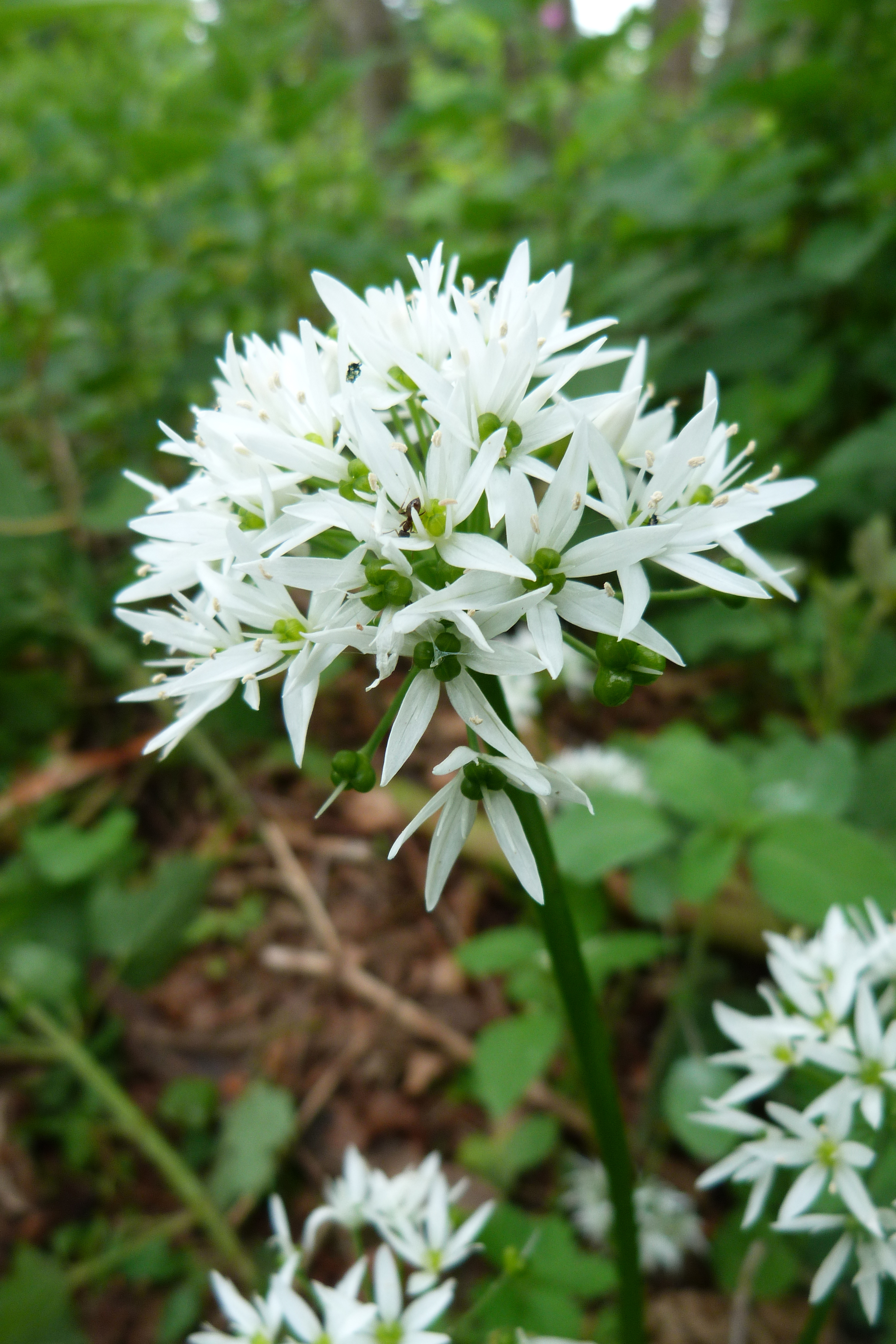
Wild garlic, Lake Retournemer.

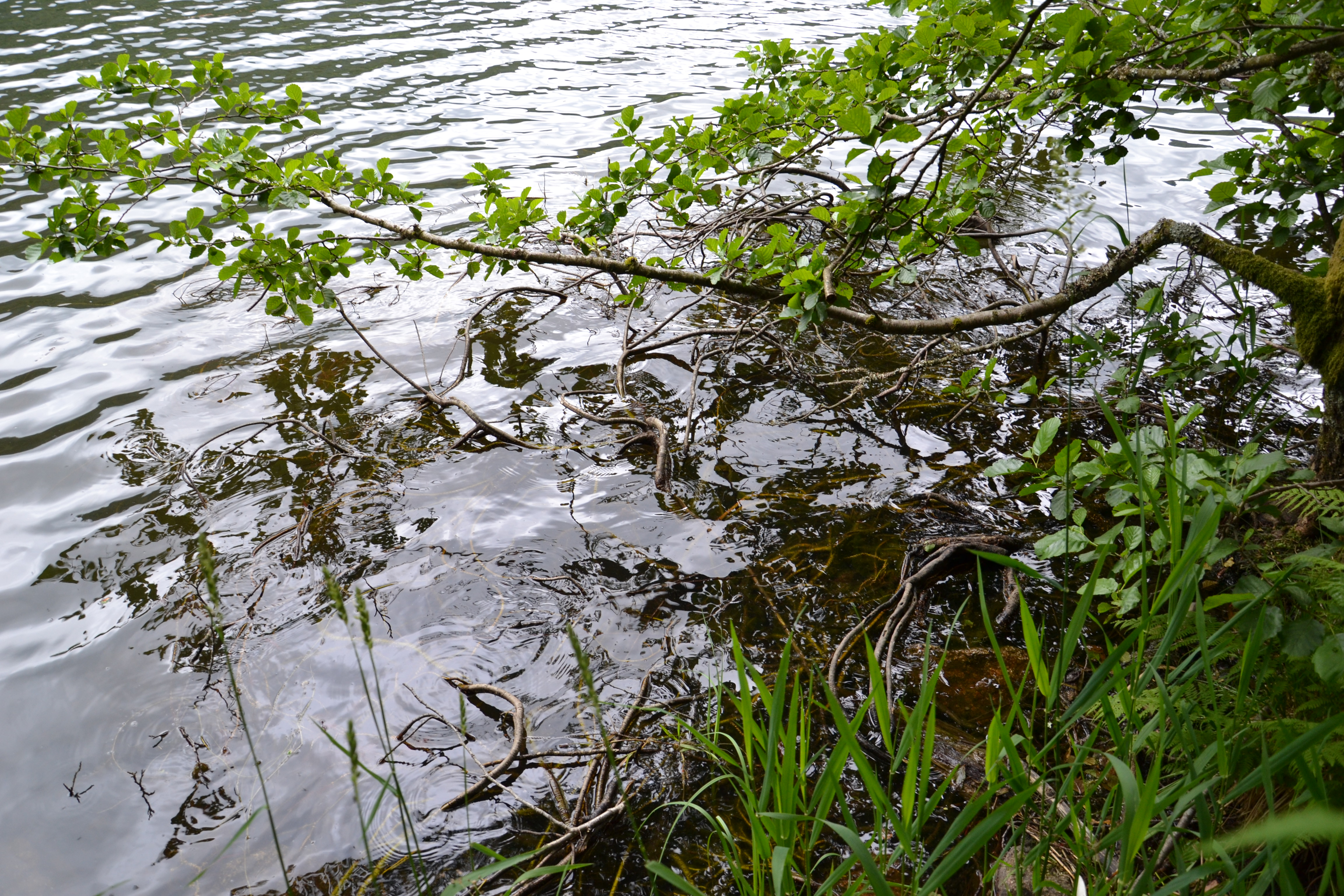
Black alder with submerged roots, Lake Retournemer.

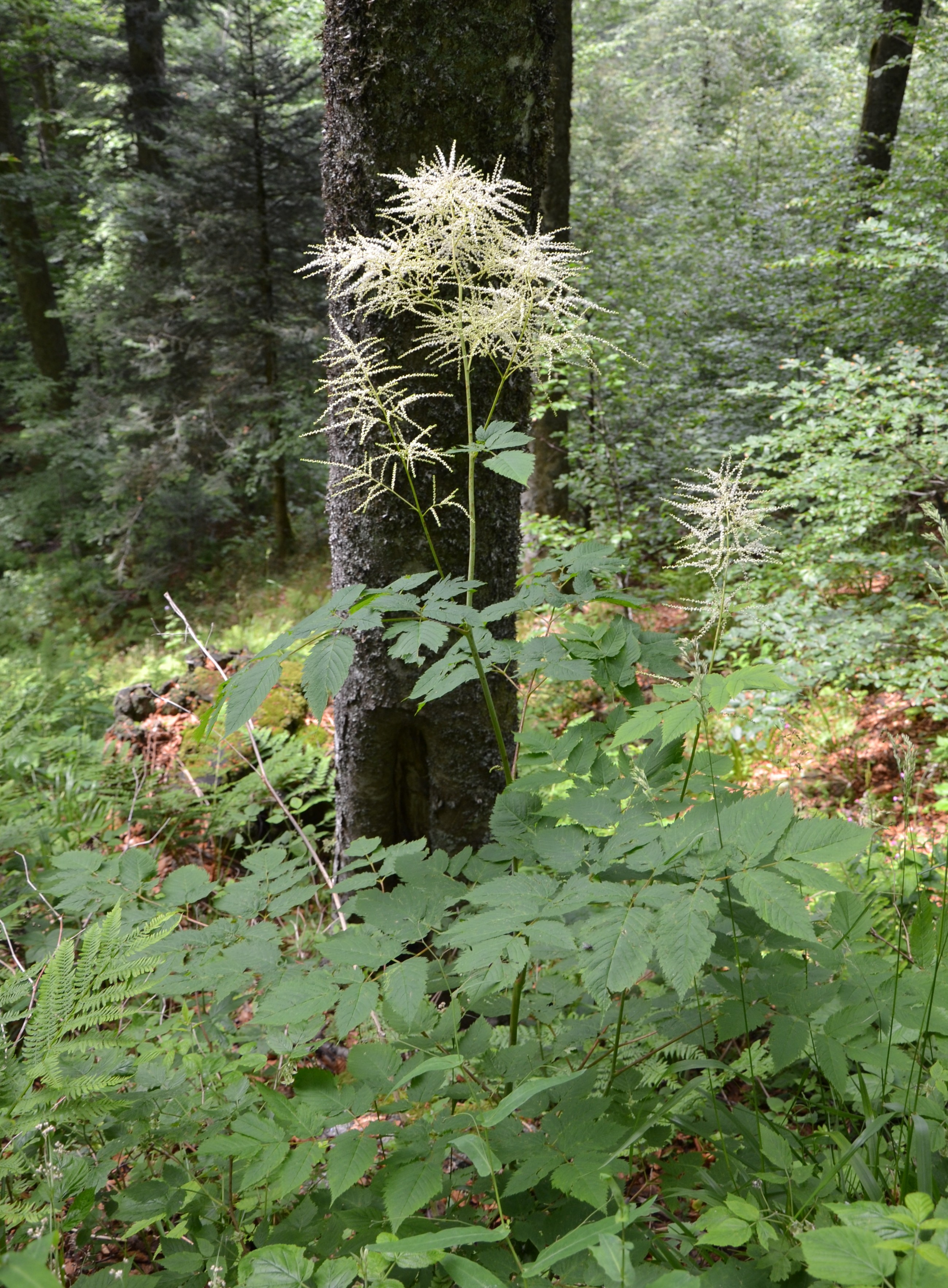
Goat's beard, Xonrupt.

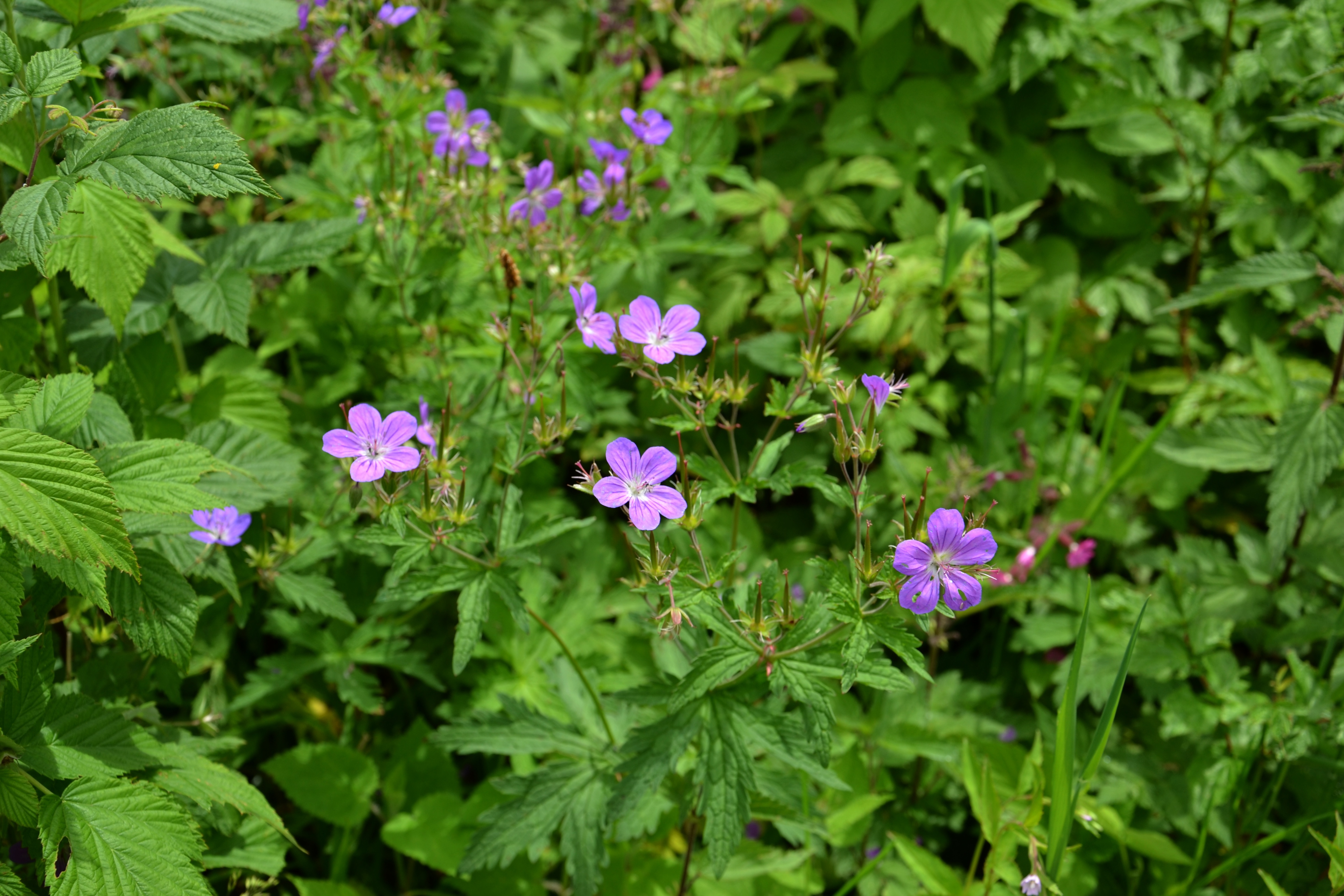
Wood cranesbill, Xonrupt.

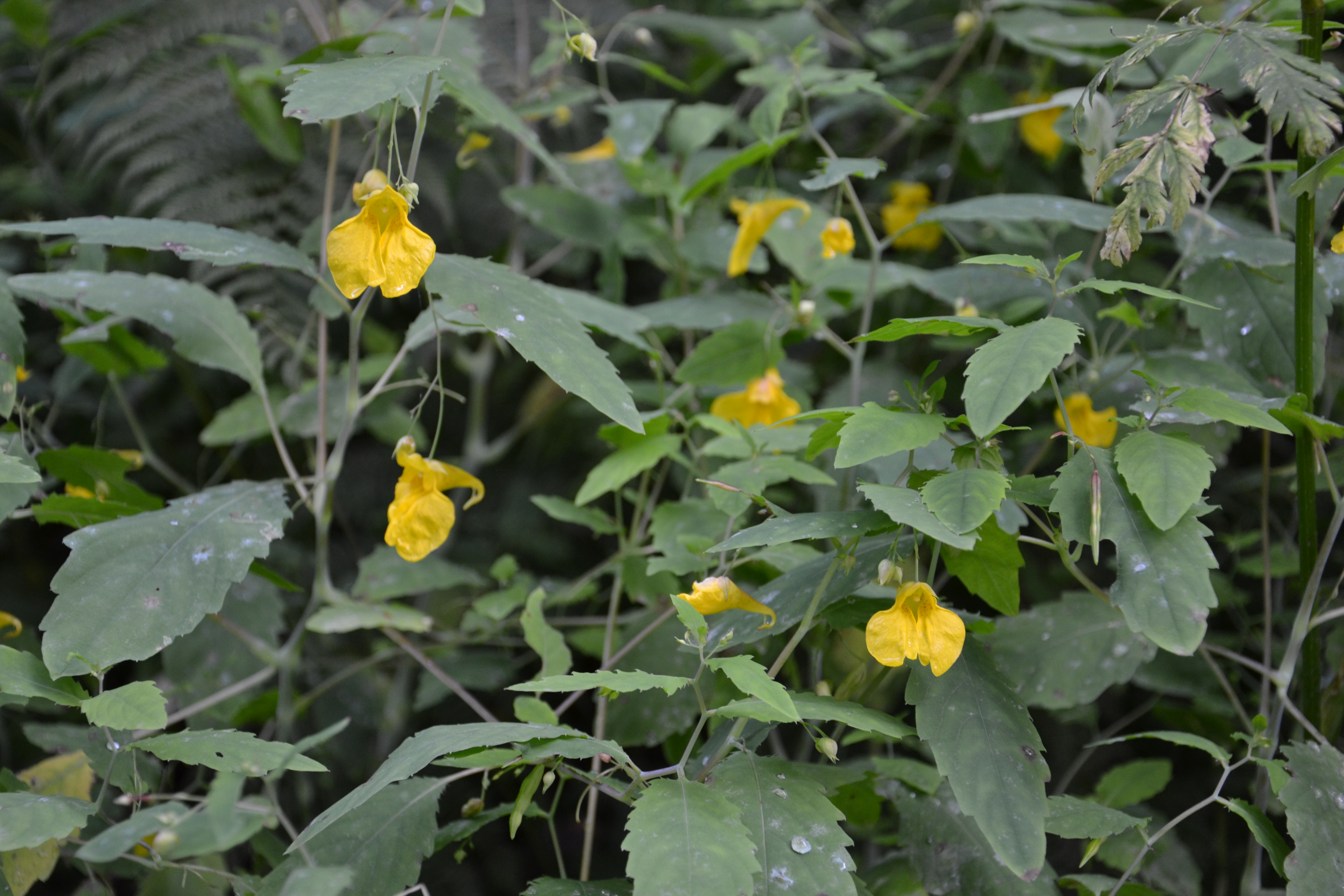
Touch-me-not balsam, La Bresse.

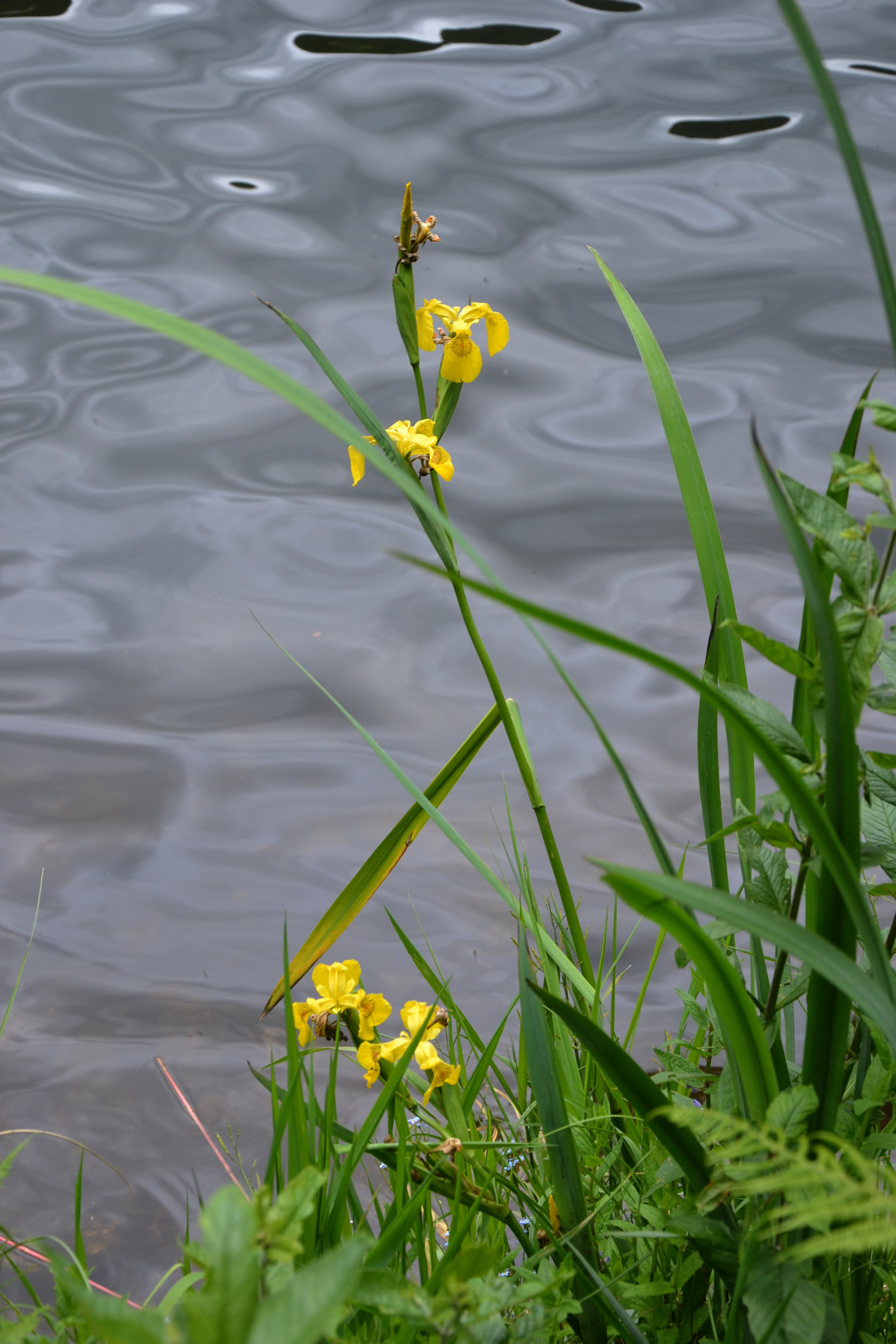
Yellow iris, Lake Retournemer.

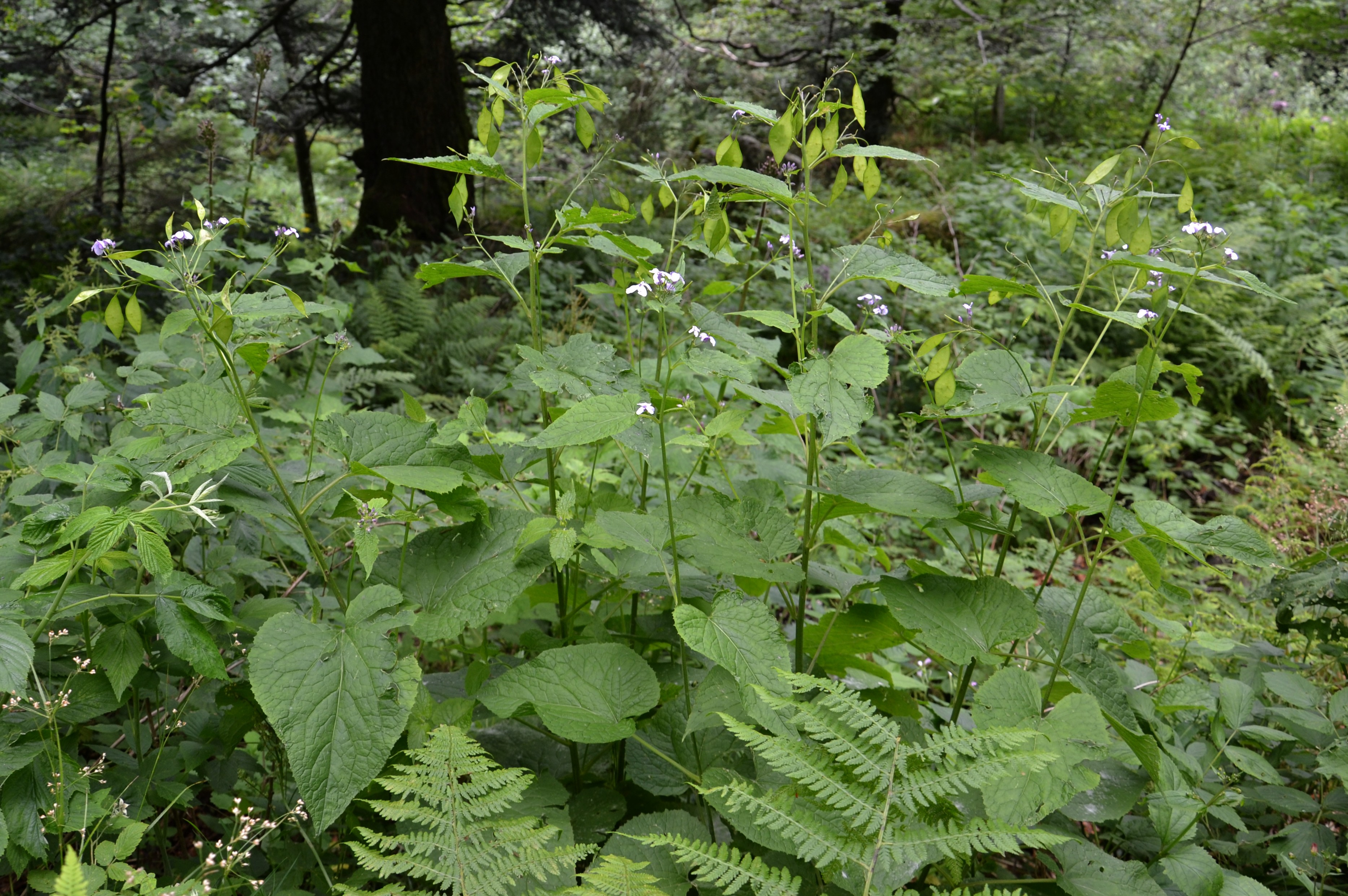
Perennial honestly, Xonrupt.

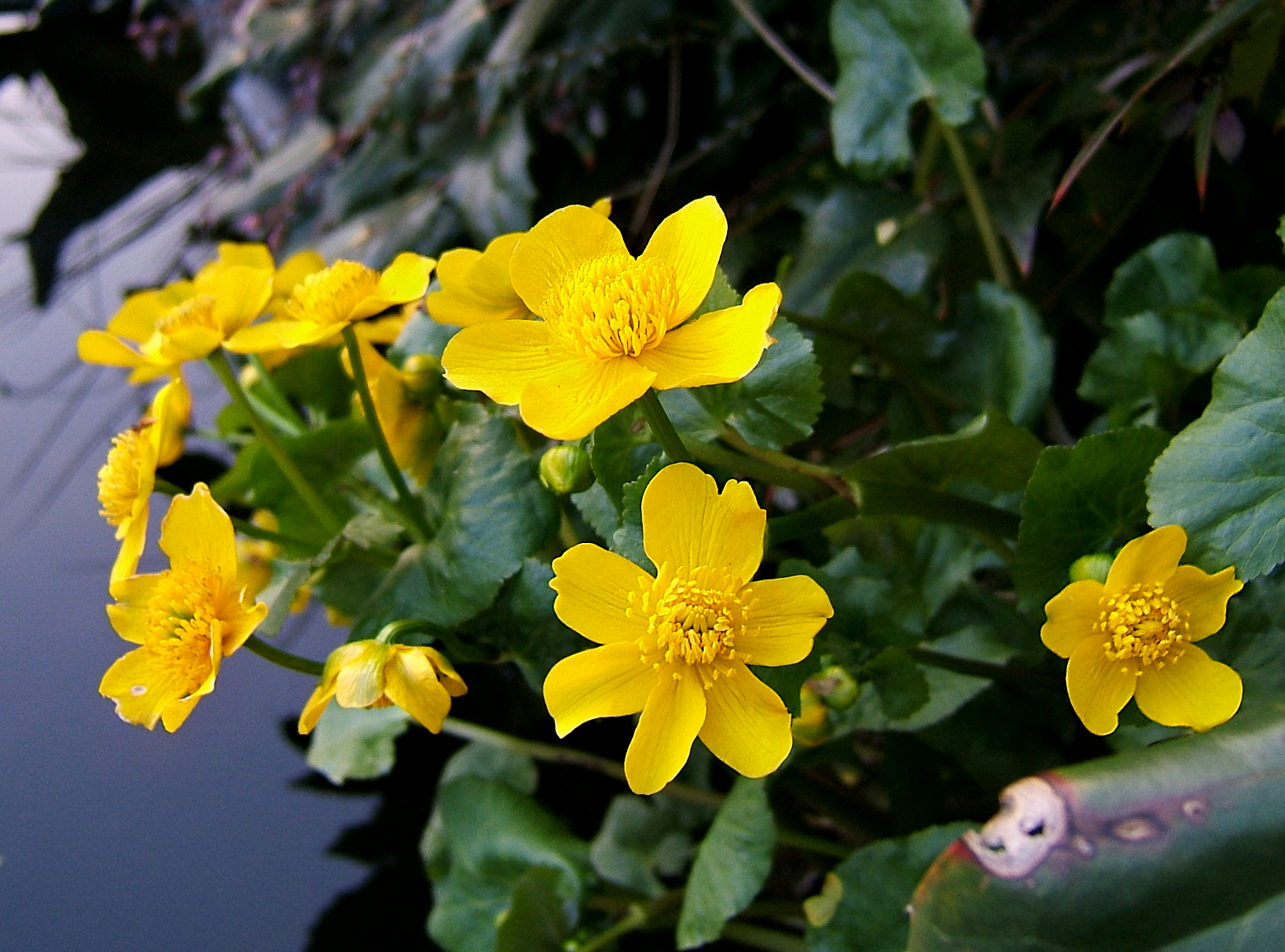
Marsh marigold.

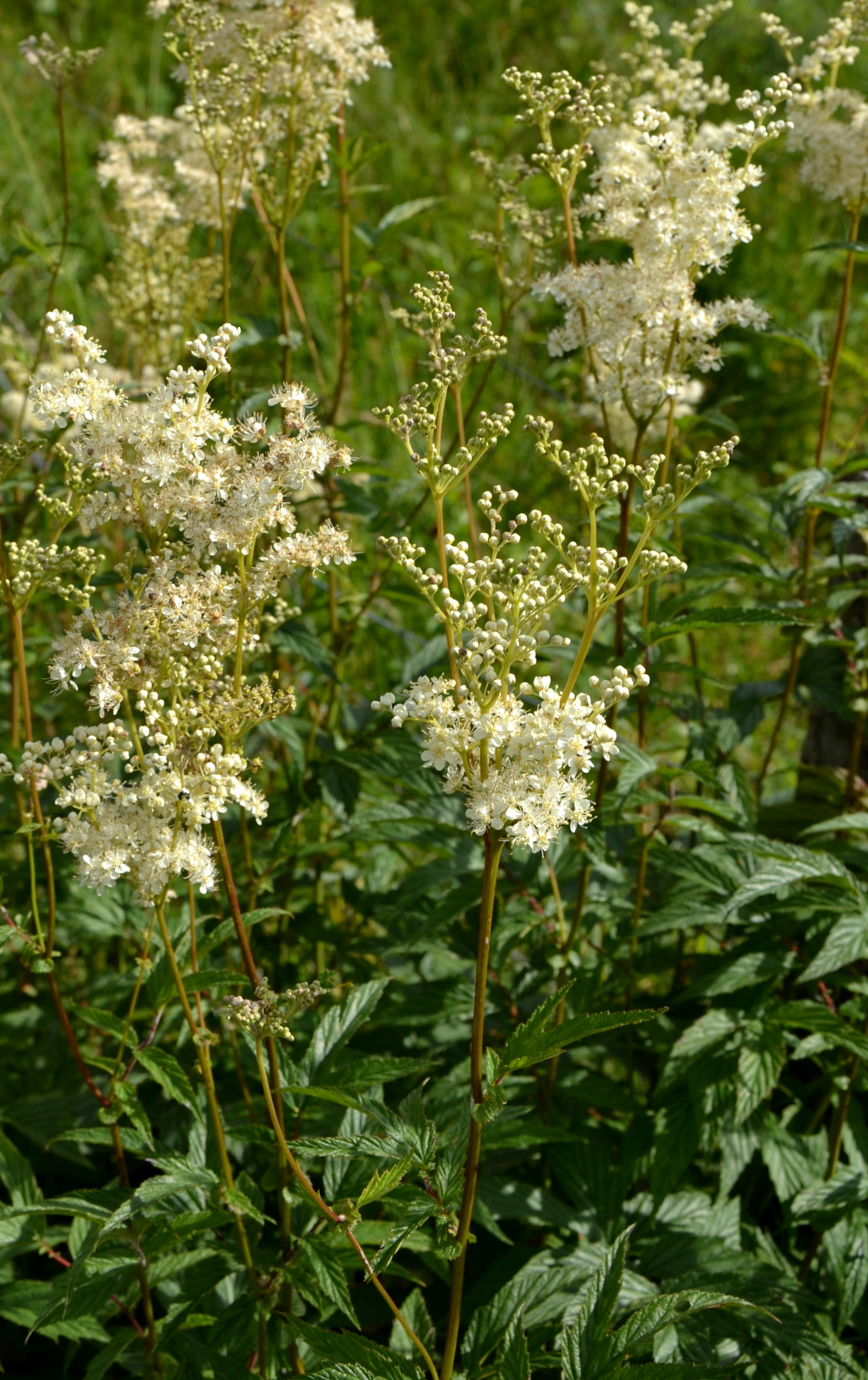
Meadowsweet, Le Tholy.

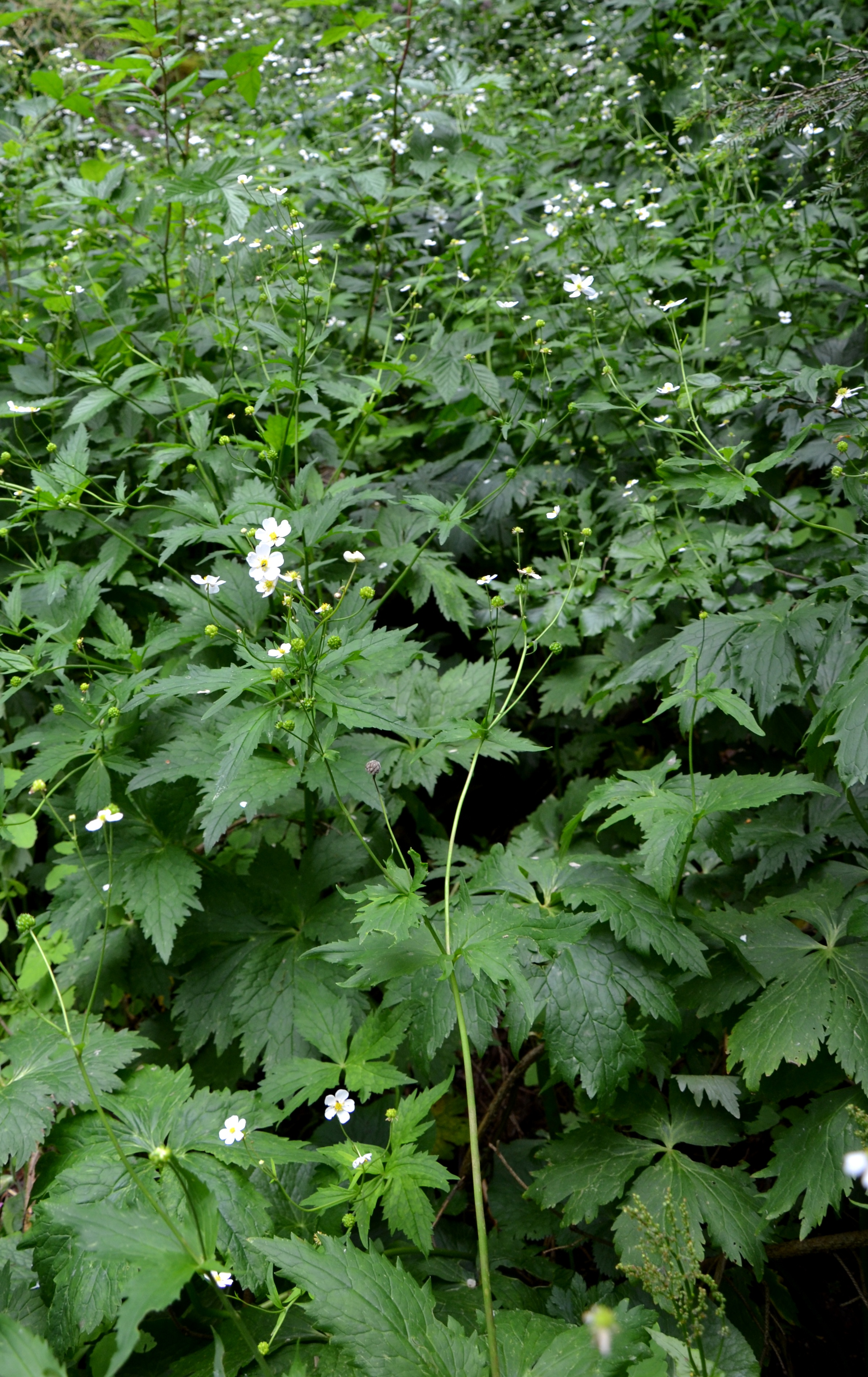
Aconite-leaved buttercup, Xonrupt.

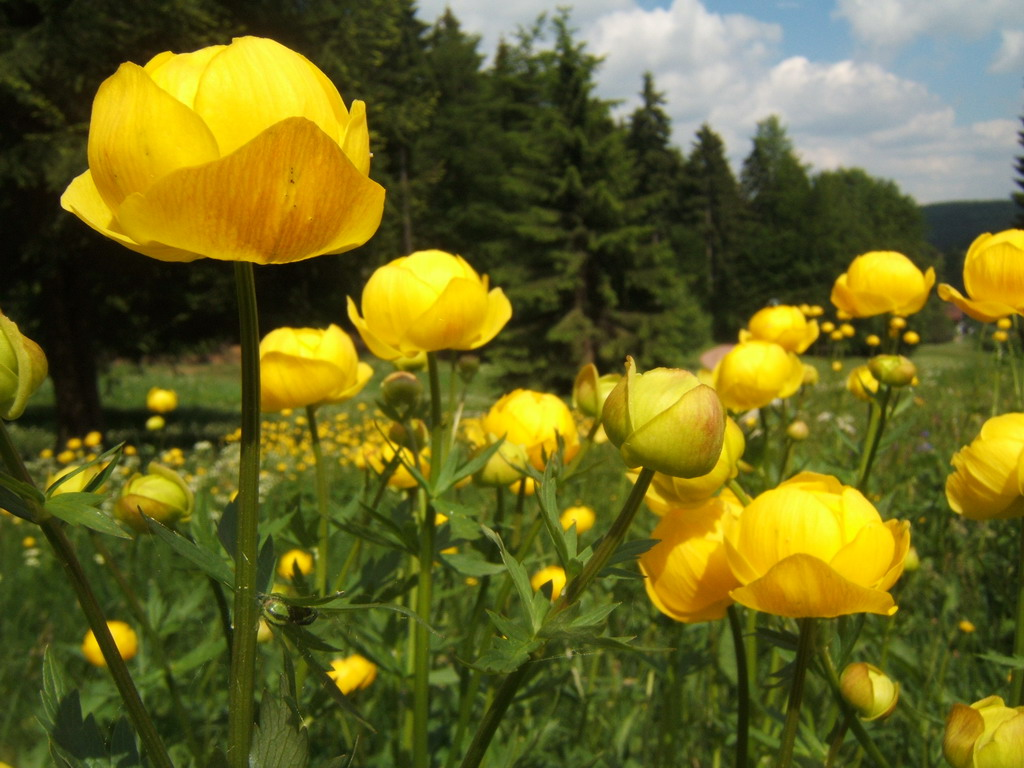
Globeflower.

Two introduced species, Japanese knotweed (Fallopia japonica) and Himalayan balsam (Impatiens glandulifera), threaten biodiversity along riverine ecosystems due to their invasive nature.

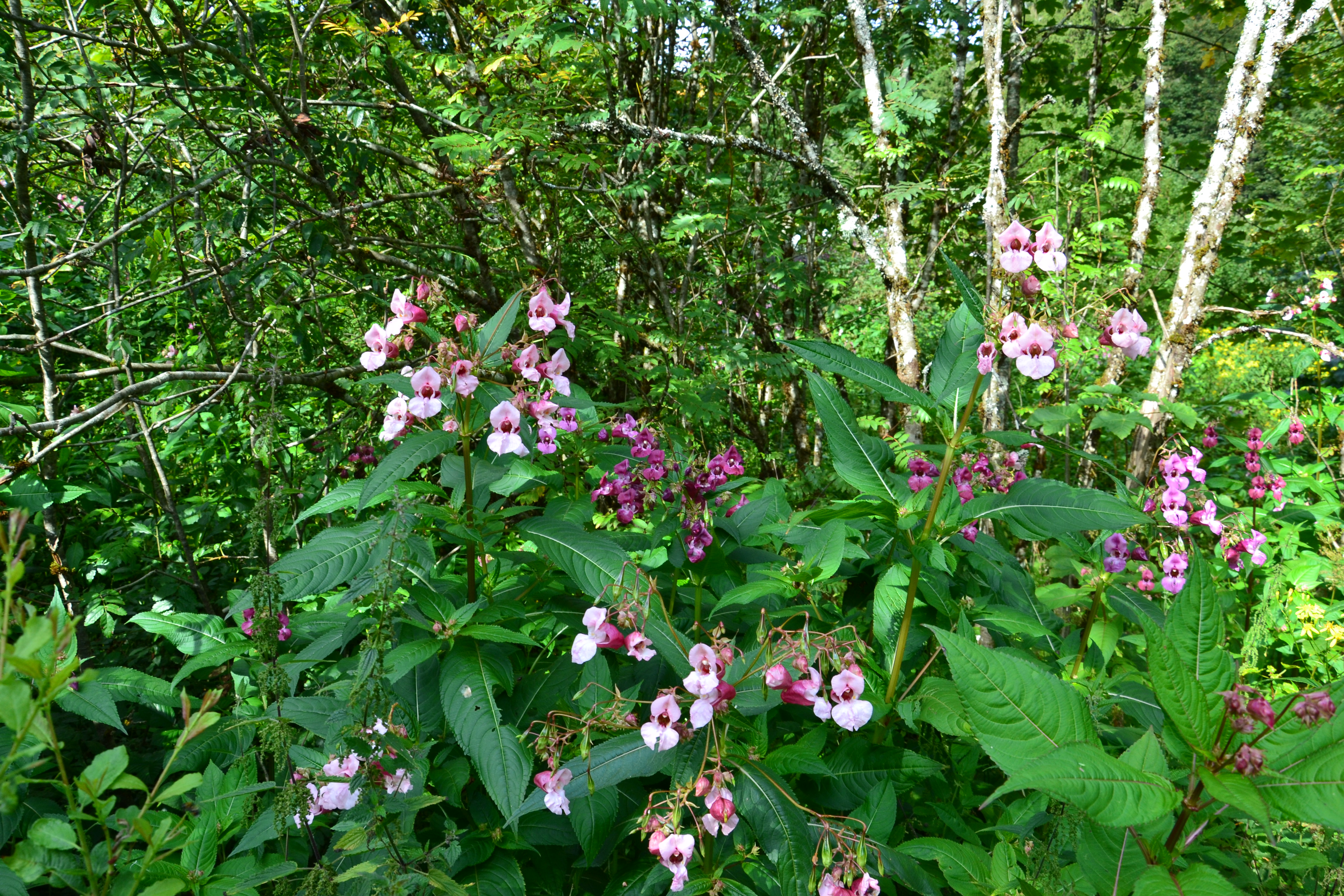
Himalayan balsam, La Bresse.

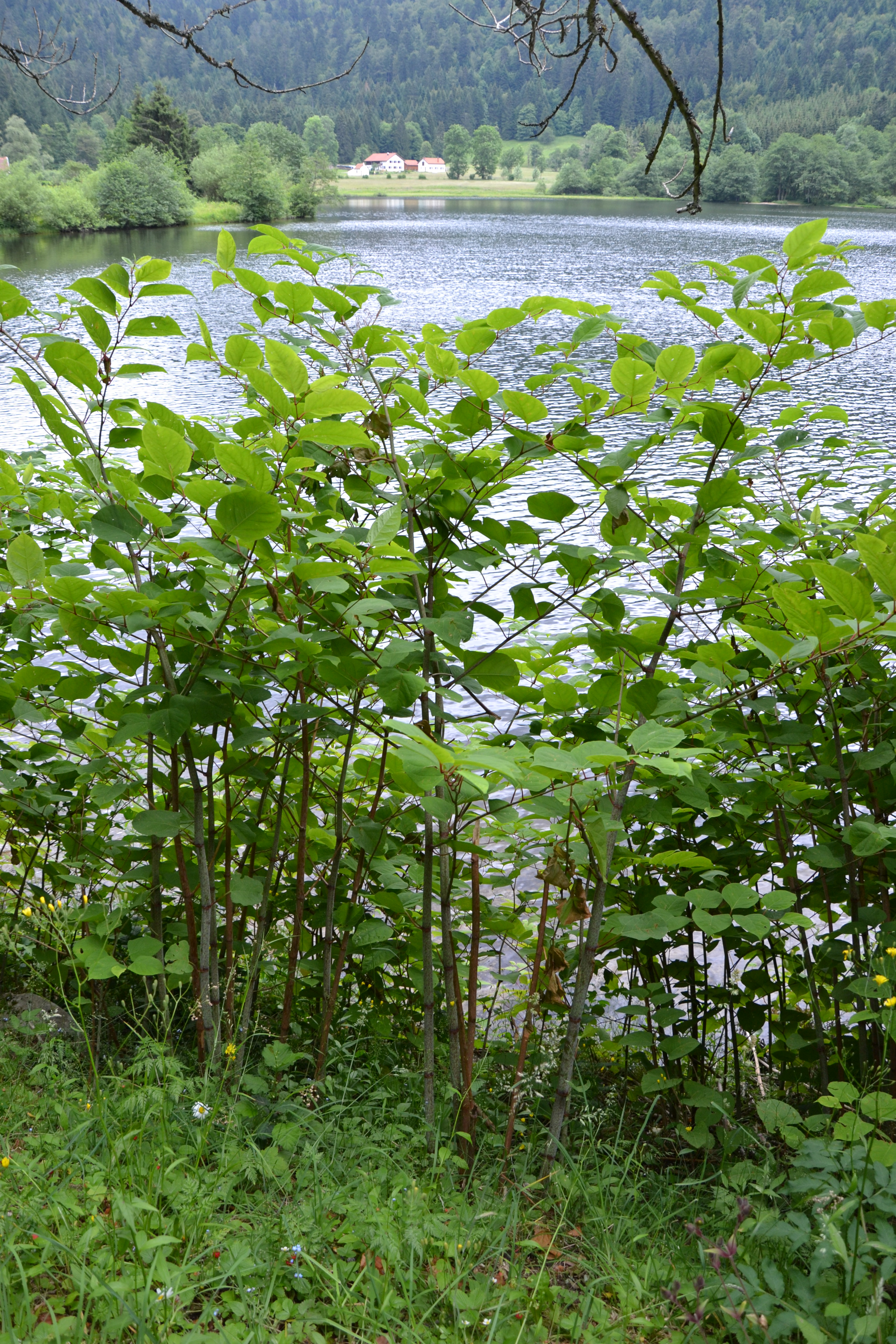
Japanese knotweed, Xonrupt.

===== Peatlands =====
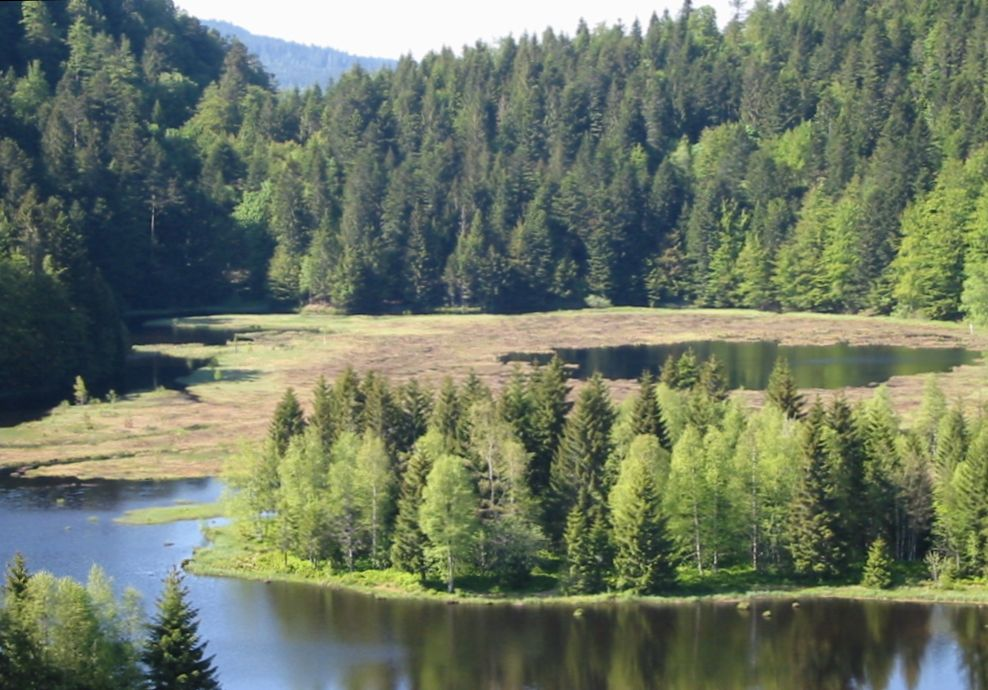
Peat bog at Lake Lispach, La Bresse.

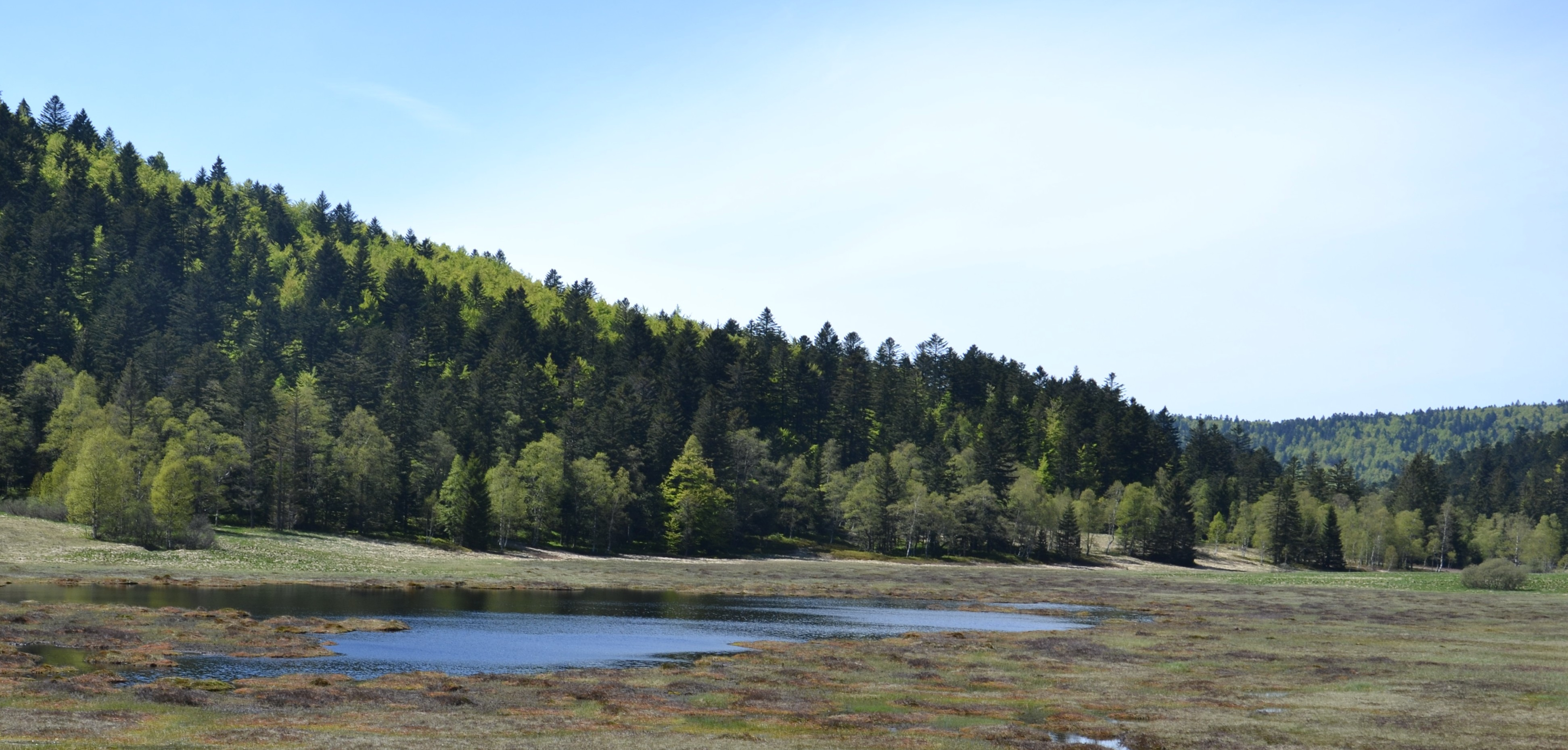
Peat bog at Etang de Machais, La Bresse.

A peatland is defined as a wetland characterized by the gradual accumulation of peat, a soil type distinguished by its exceptionally high organic matter content, which is largely un-decomposed and of plant origin. Following the retreat of the glaciers after the last glacial period, basins and lakes facilitated the formation of peatlands. In the water expanses, mats of sphagnum mosses develop, which are rootless mosses capable of absorbing 40 times their weight in water. The dwarf water lily (Nuphar pumila) also grows in these environments, but this species is declining, as are bladderworts, including the lesser bladderwort (Utricularia minor) and the common bladderwort (Utricularia vulgaris).

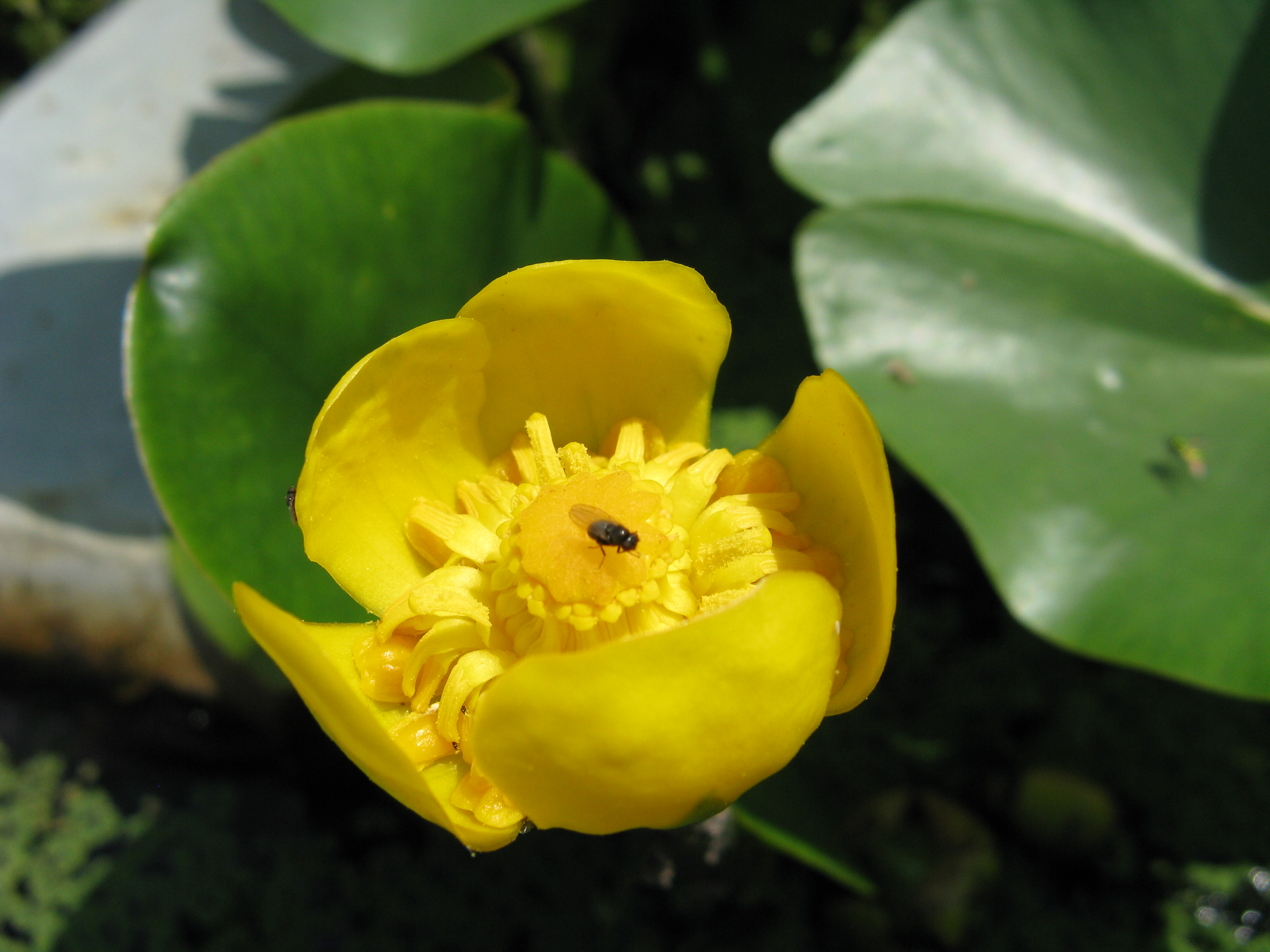
Dwarf water lily

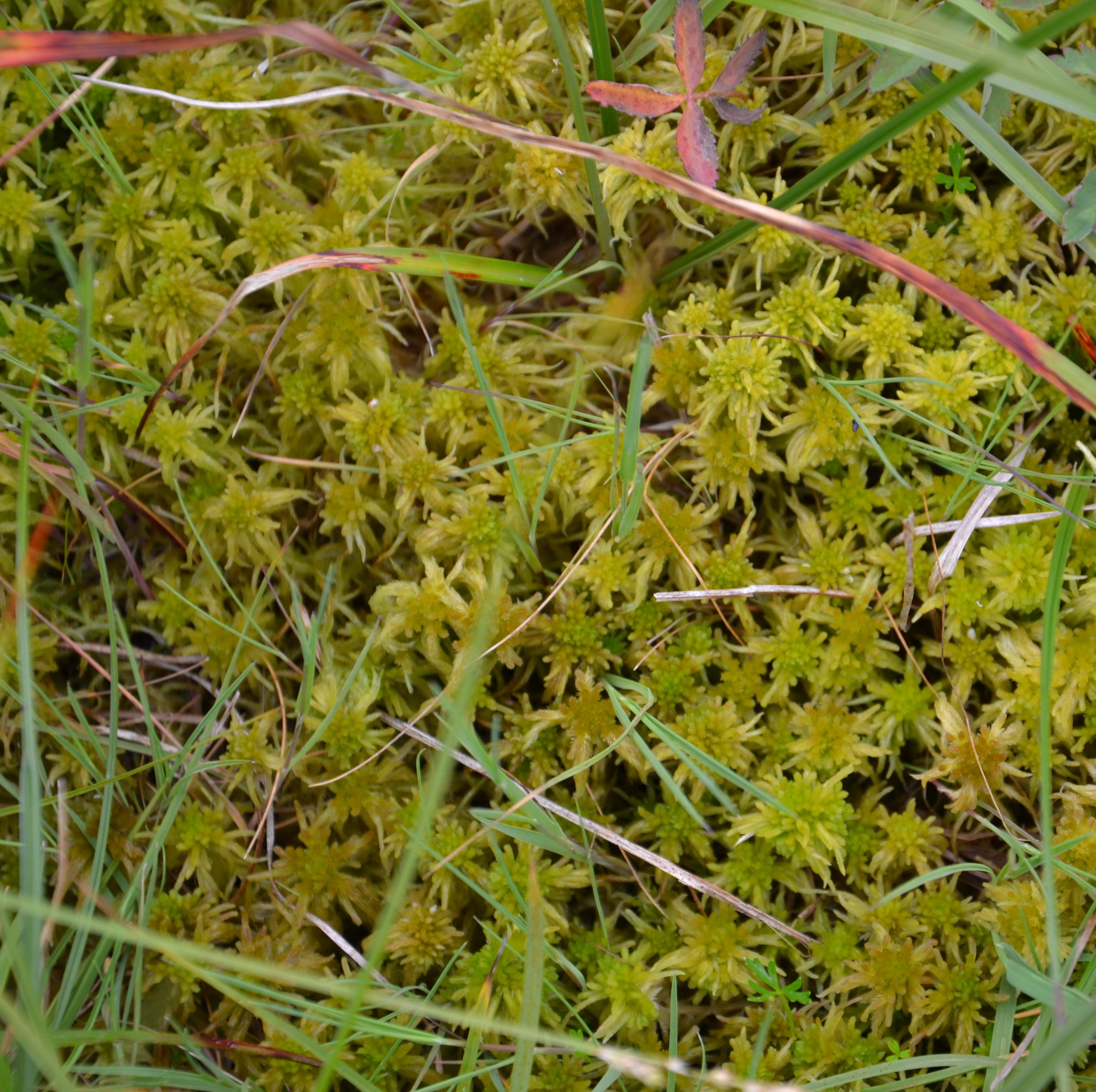
Sphagnum, undetermined species, La Bresse.

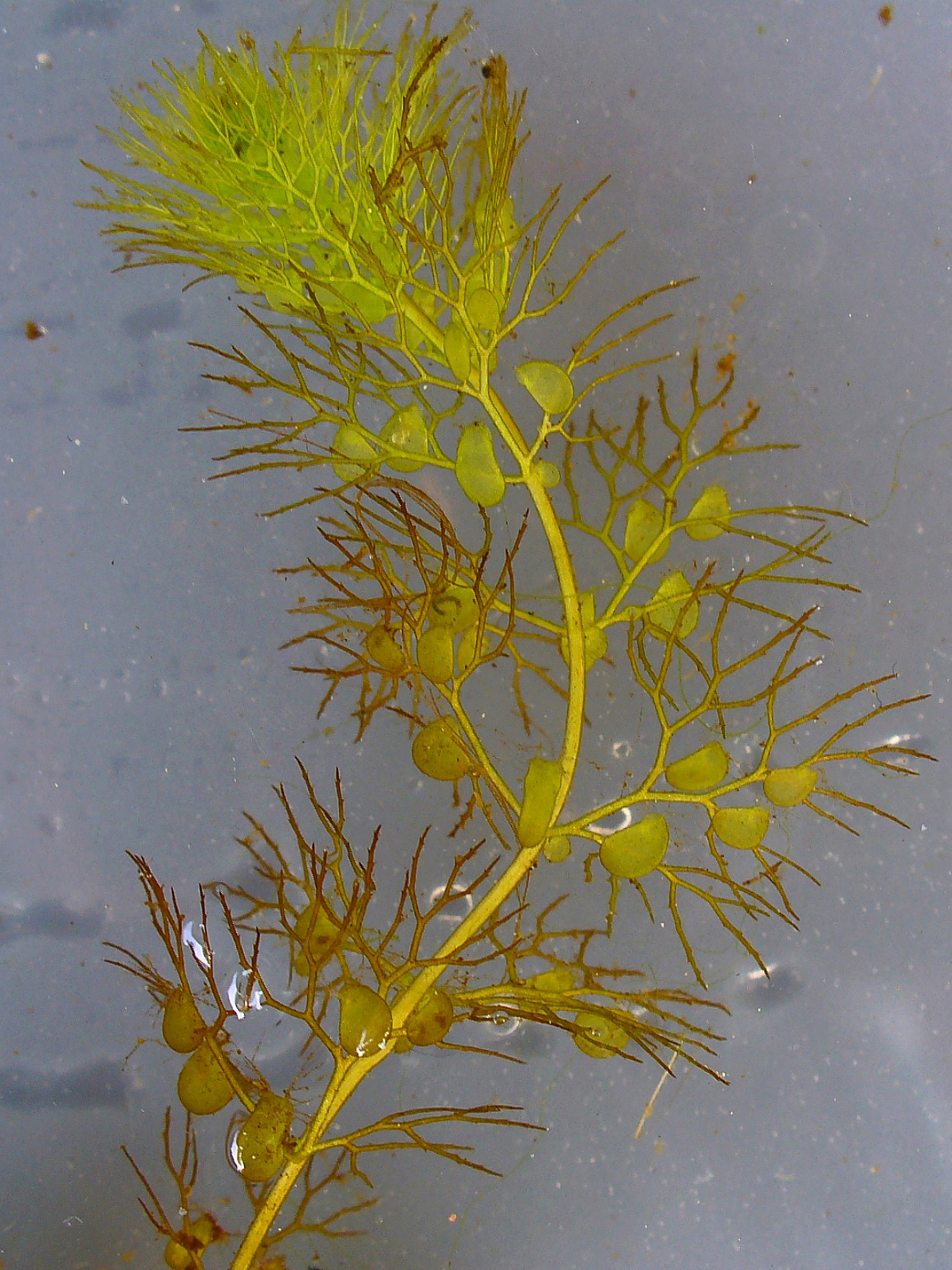
Common bladderwort.

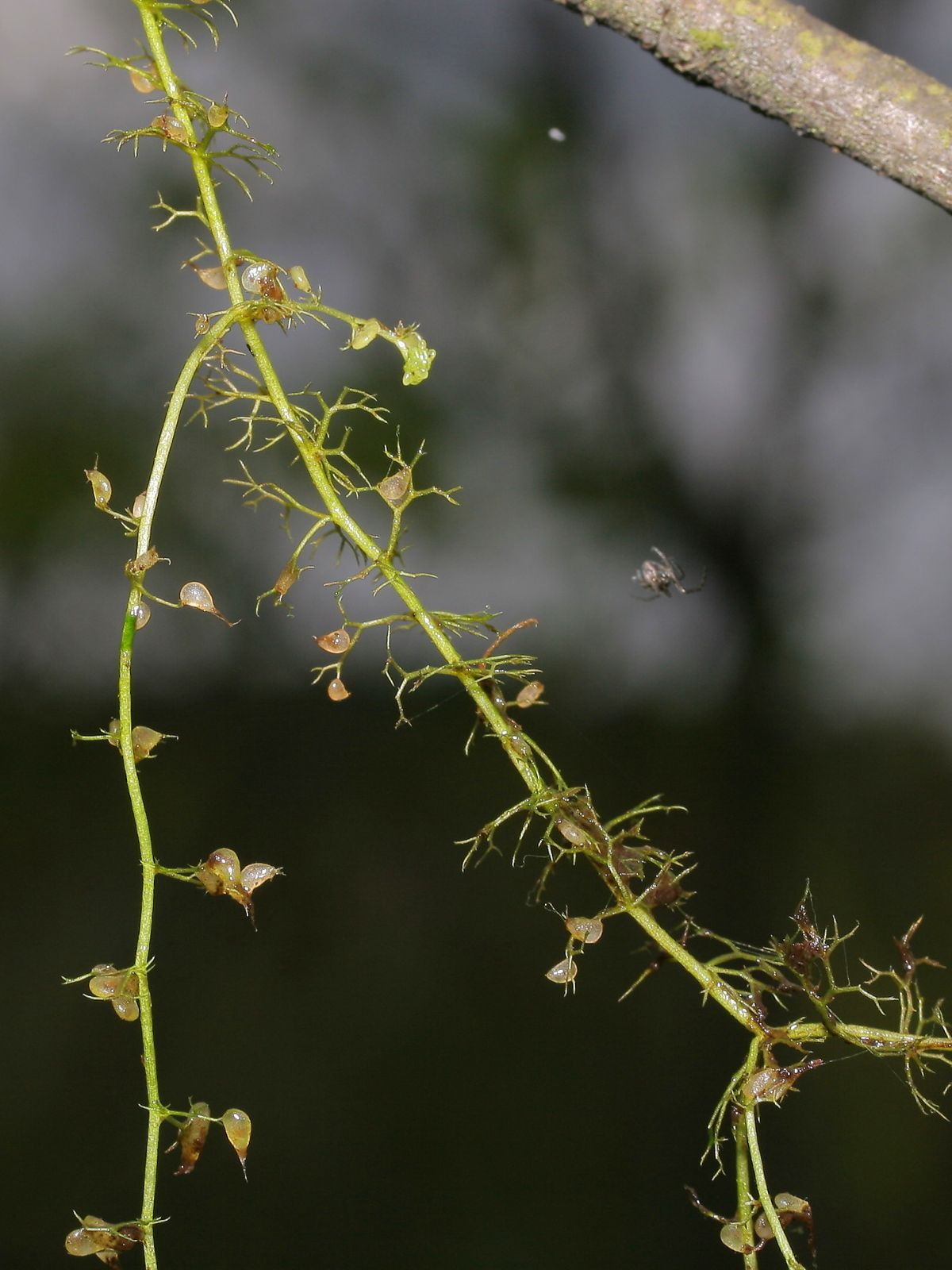
Small bladderwort.

The formation of sphagnum mats eventually results in the development of cushions on which carnivorous plants, such as the round-leaved sundew (Drosera rotundifolia), great sundew (Drosera anglica syn. Drosera longifolia), and spoonleaf sundew (Drosera intermedia), can thrive. The sundew's hairs are coated with adhesive droplets that resemble dew, enabling the plant to capture insects. Another carnivorous plant is the common butterwort (Pinguicula vulgaris), which also possesses adhesive hairs on its leaves, enabling it to capture insects. Additionally, the flora includes bogbean (Menyanthes trifoliata), marsh clubmoss (Lycopodiella inundata), pod grass (Scheuchzeria palustris), and cranberry (Vaccinium oxycoccos). Additionally, the following species can be observed: Vaccinium macrocarpon, a species closely related to the large-fruited cranberry (Vaccinium macrocarpon) that is exploited by the food industry in North America, and Rhynchospora alba, commonly known as white beak-sedge. Additionally, the marsh calla (Calla palustris), a rare plant endemic to France, is present in the Vosges massif. A rare orchid, Traunstein's dactylorhiza (Dactylorhiza traunsteineri), with purplish flowers reminiscent of the early-purple orchid (Orchis mascula), presents a challenge for identification. (Note: Many plants resembling Dactylorhiza traunsteineri found in the bogs in the southern part of the massif are rather classified as Dactylorhiza majalis subsp. parvimajalis.) Furthermore, the marsh violet (Viola palustris) is distinguished by its mauve flowers, the marsh grass-of-Parnassus (Parnassia palustris) is identified by its white flowers with five petals and transparent veins, and the marsh cinquefoil or purple marshlocks (Potentilla palustris) is characterized by its blood-red flowers.

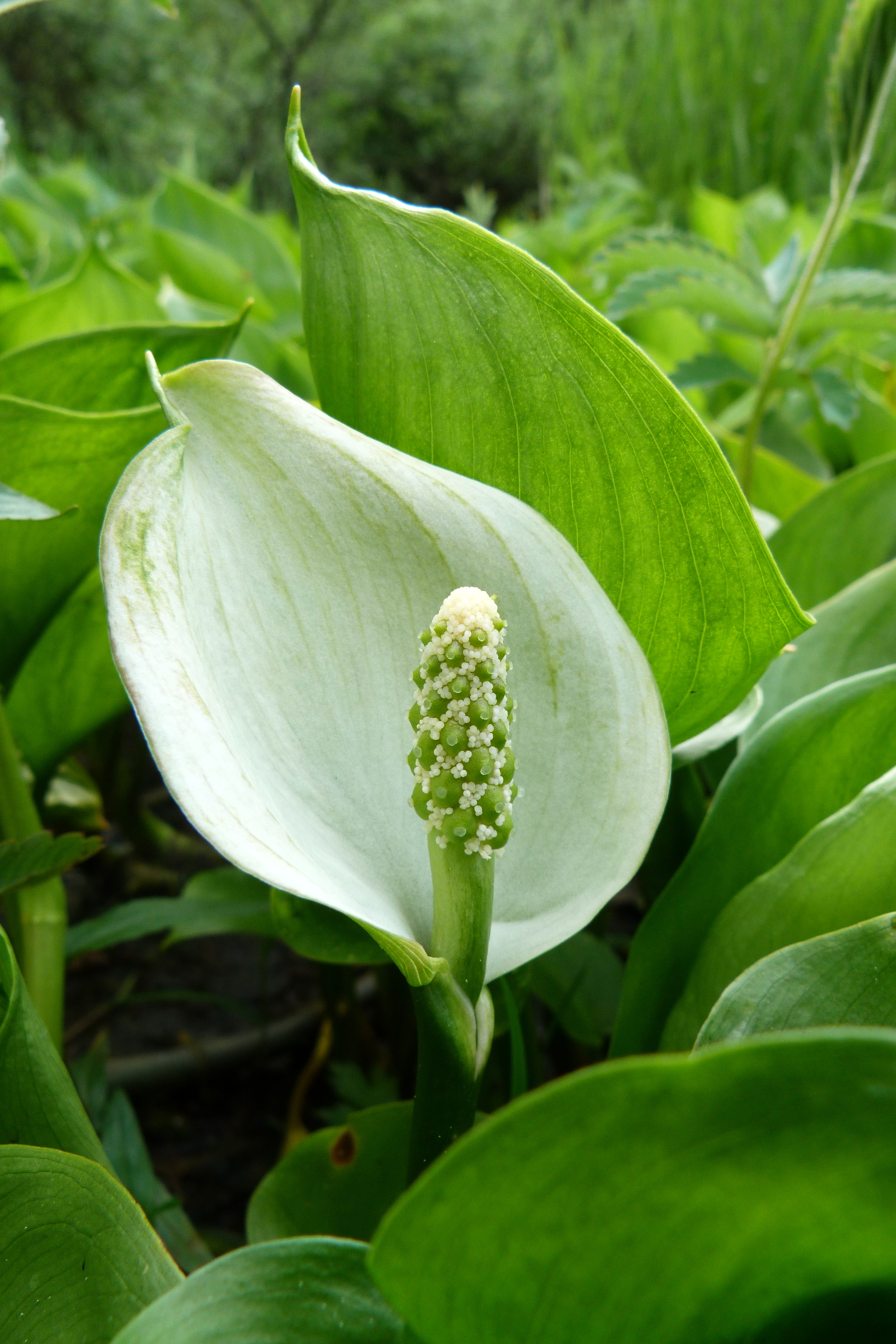
Marsh calla, Lake Retournemer.

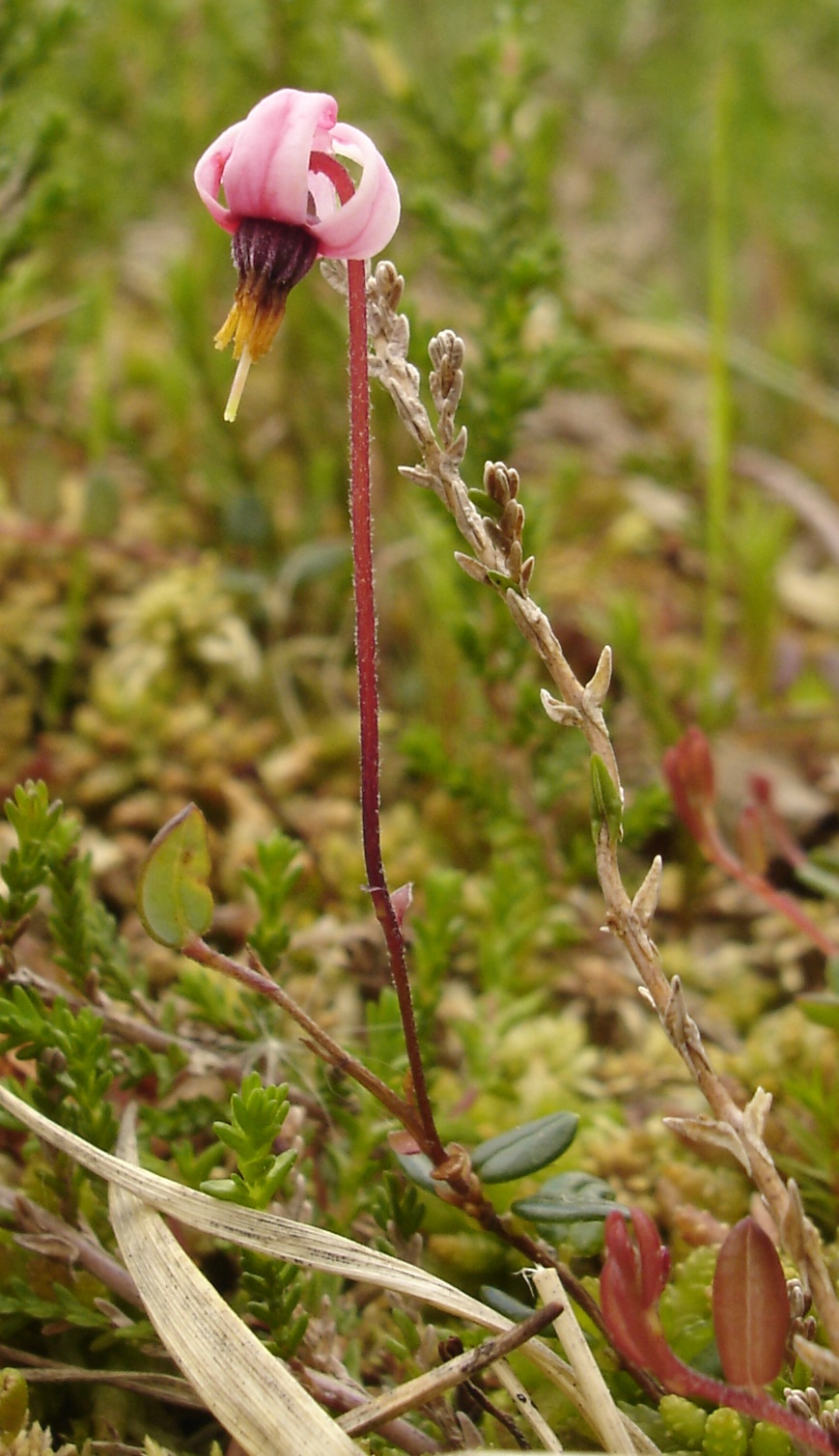
Cranberry, Vosges.

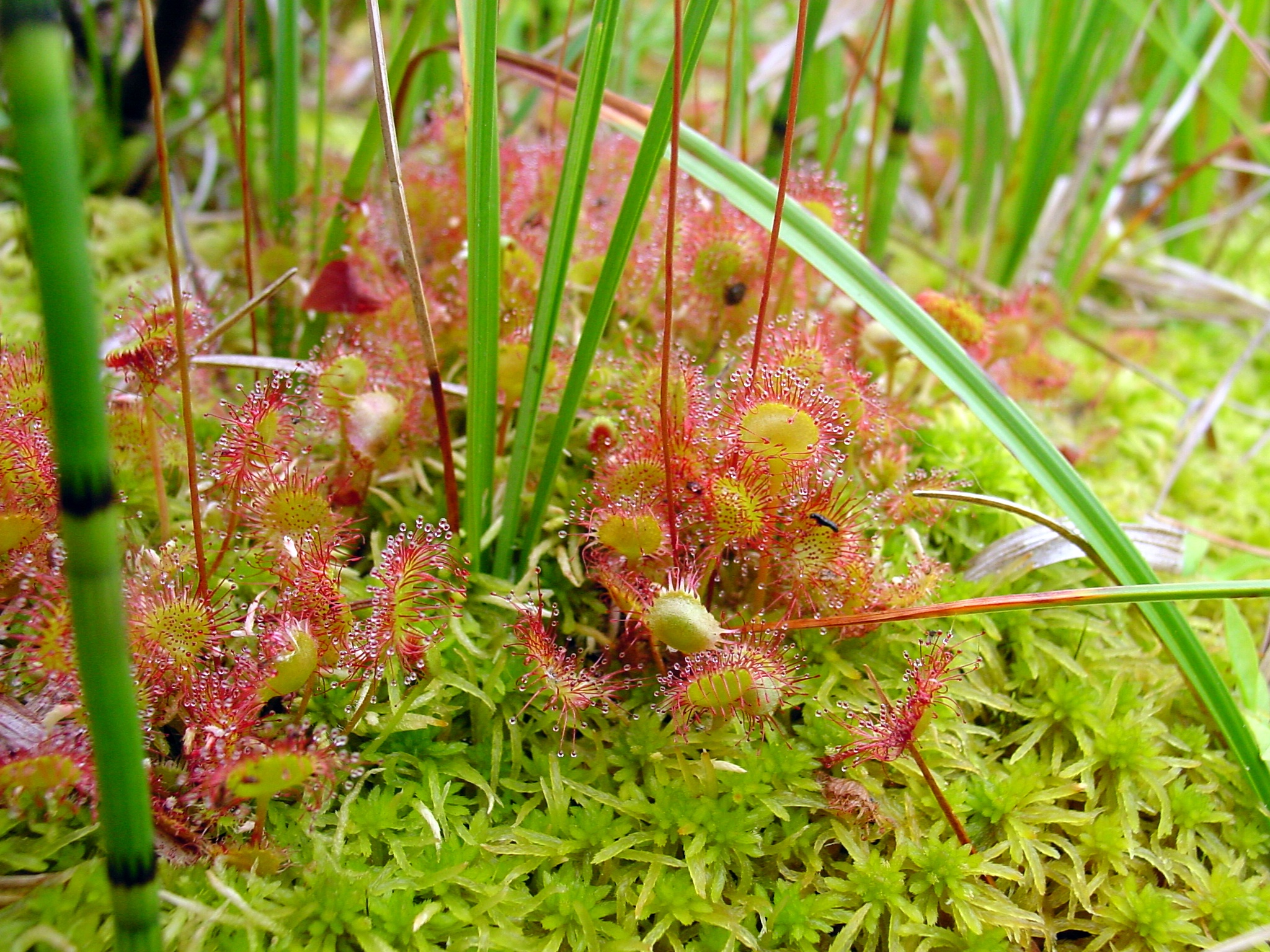
Round-leaved sundew.

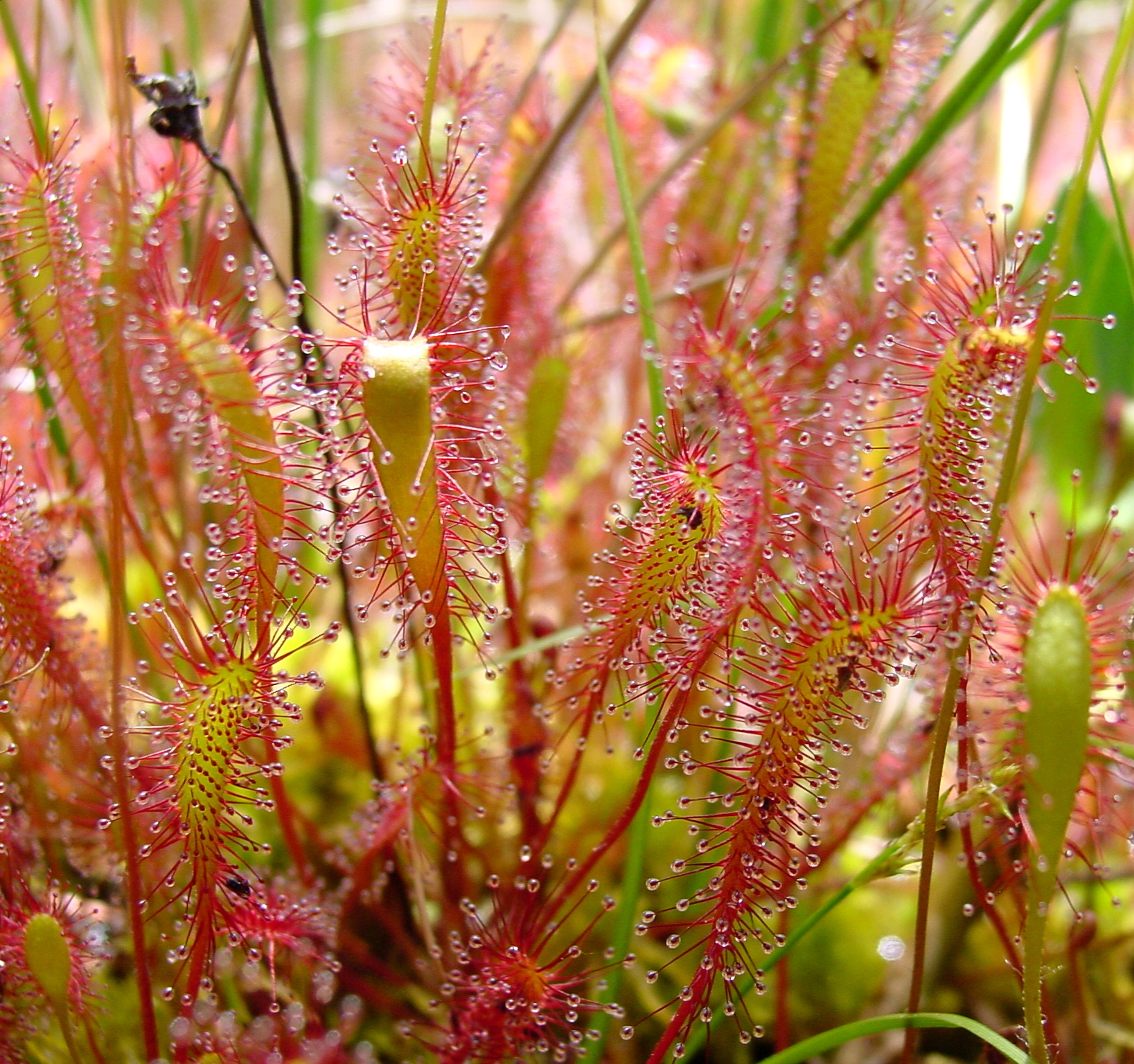
Great sundew.

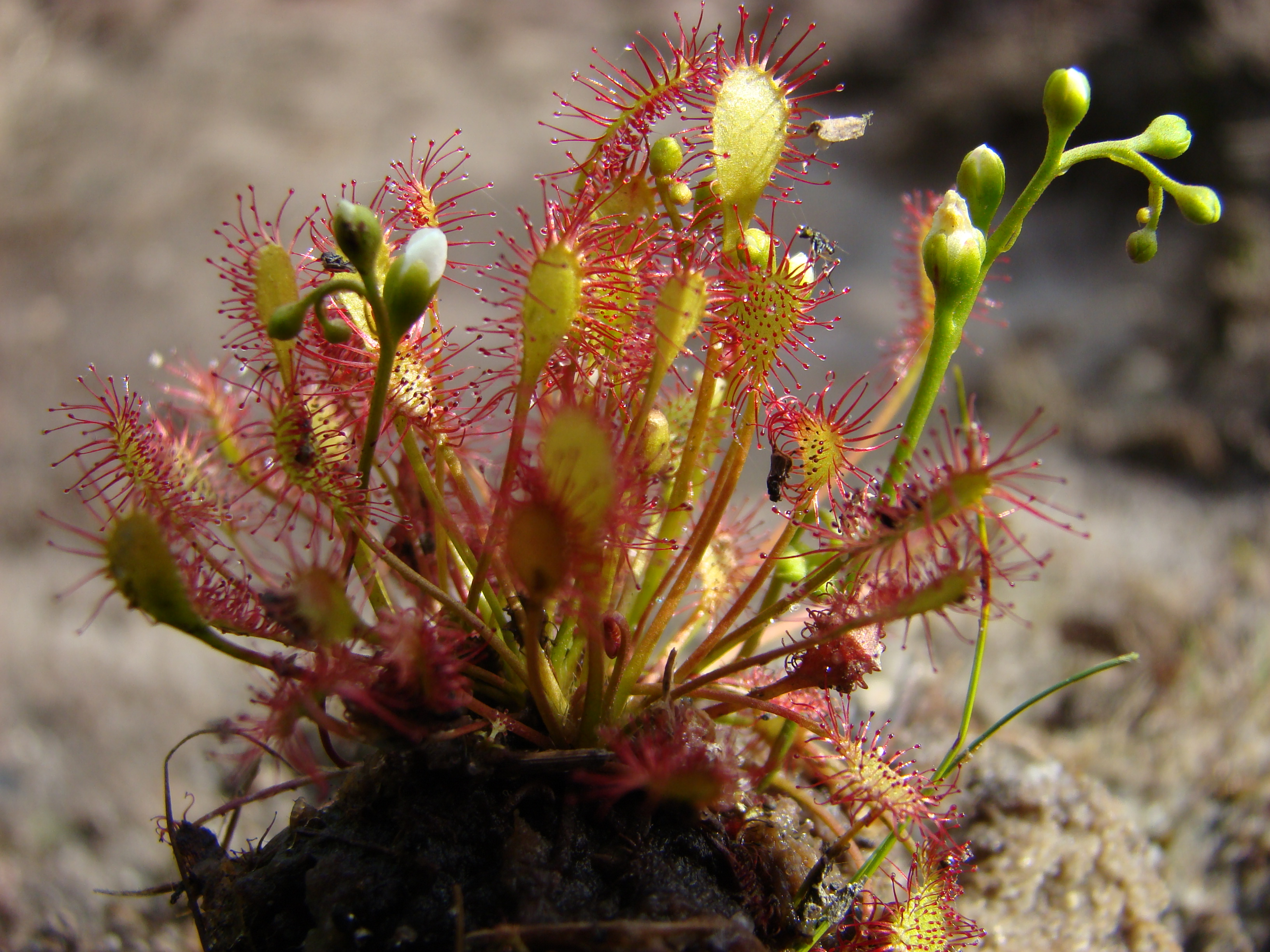
Spoonleaf sundew.

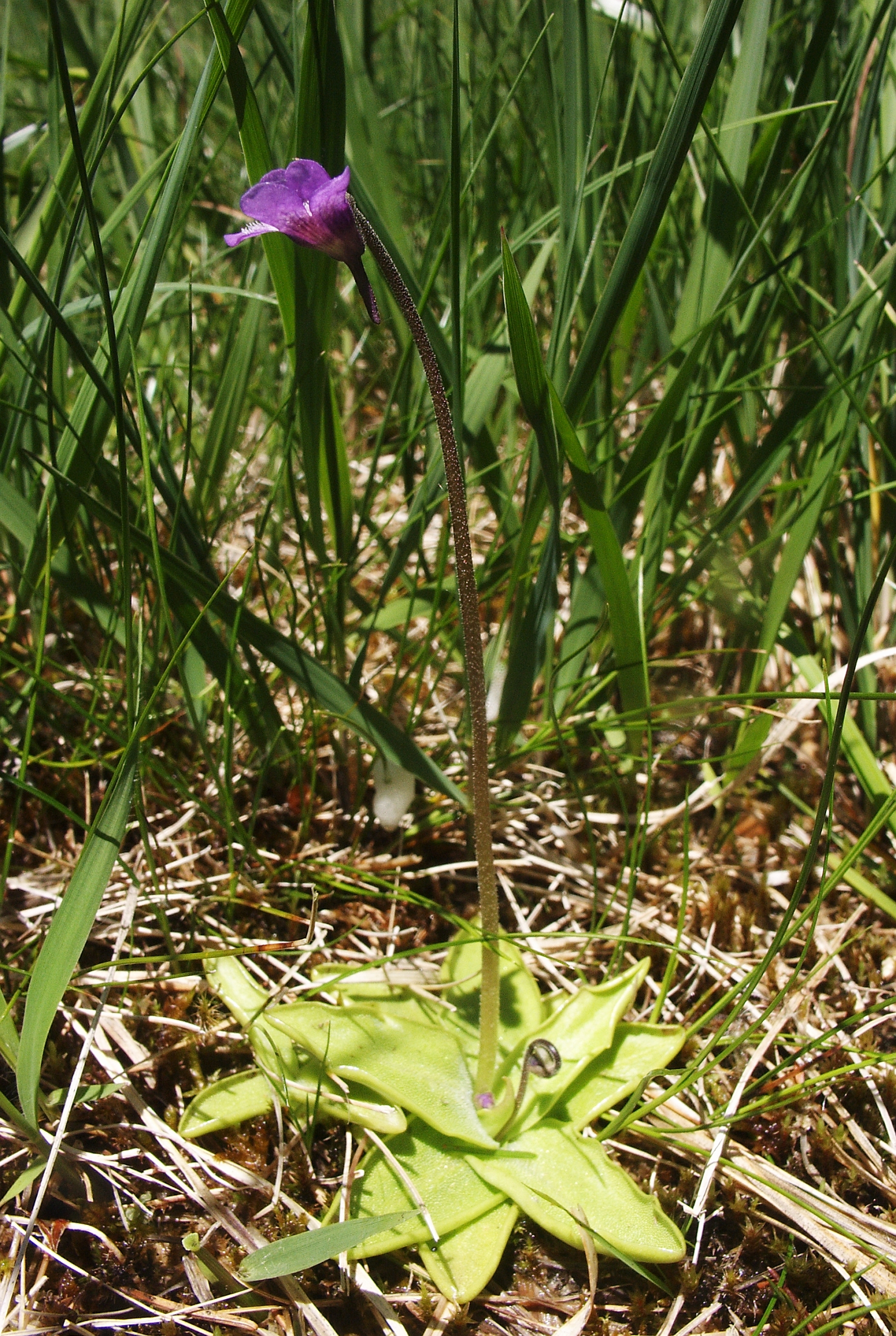
Common butterwort

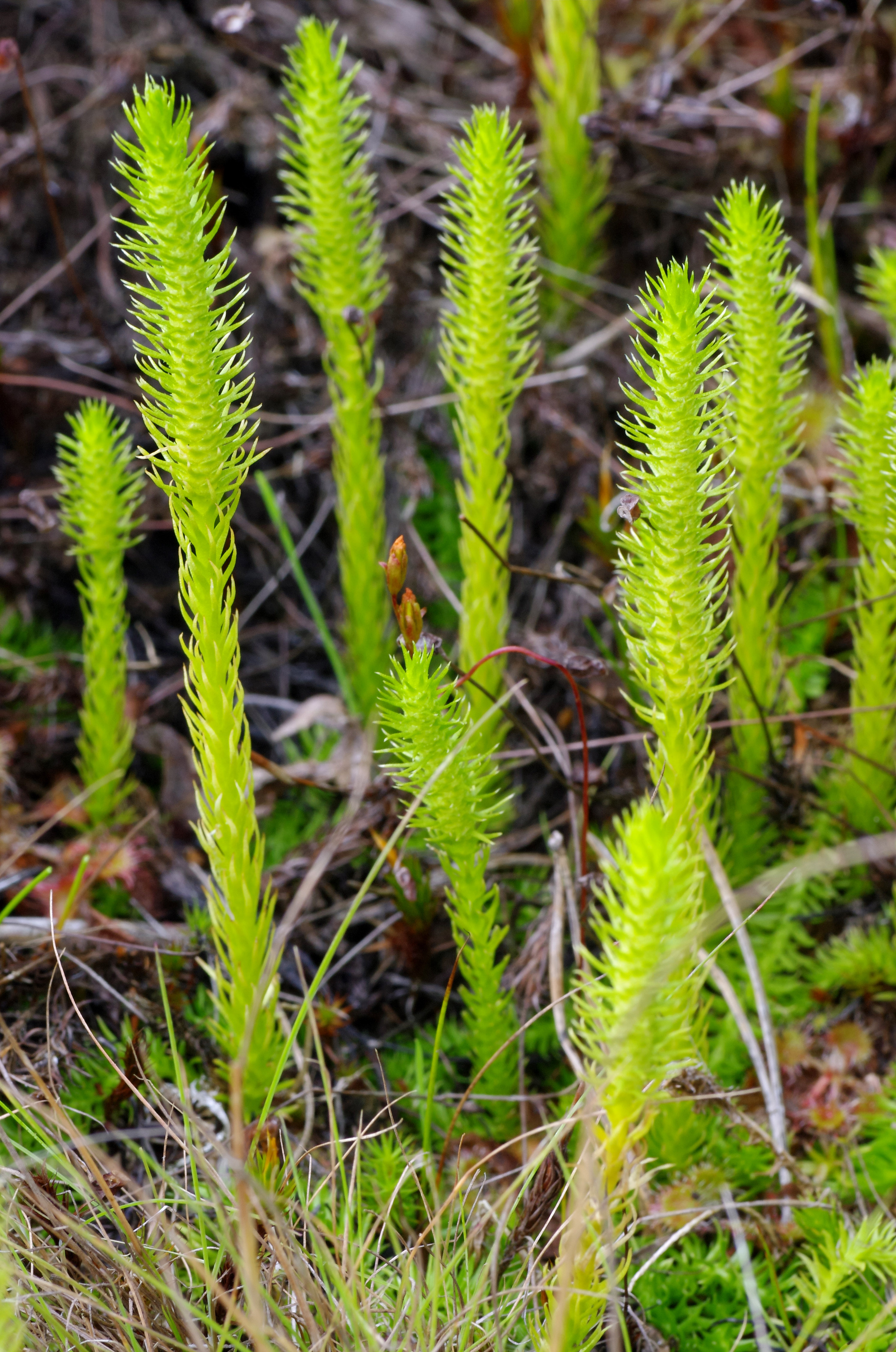
Marsh clubmoss.

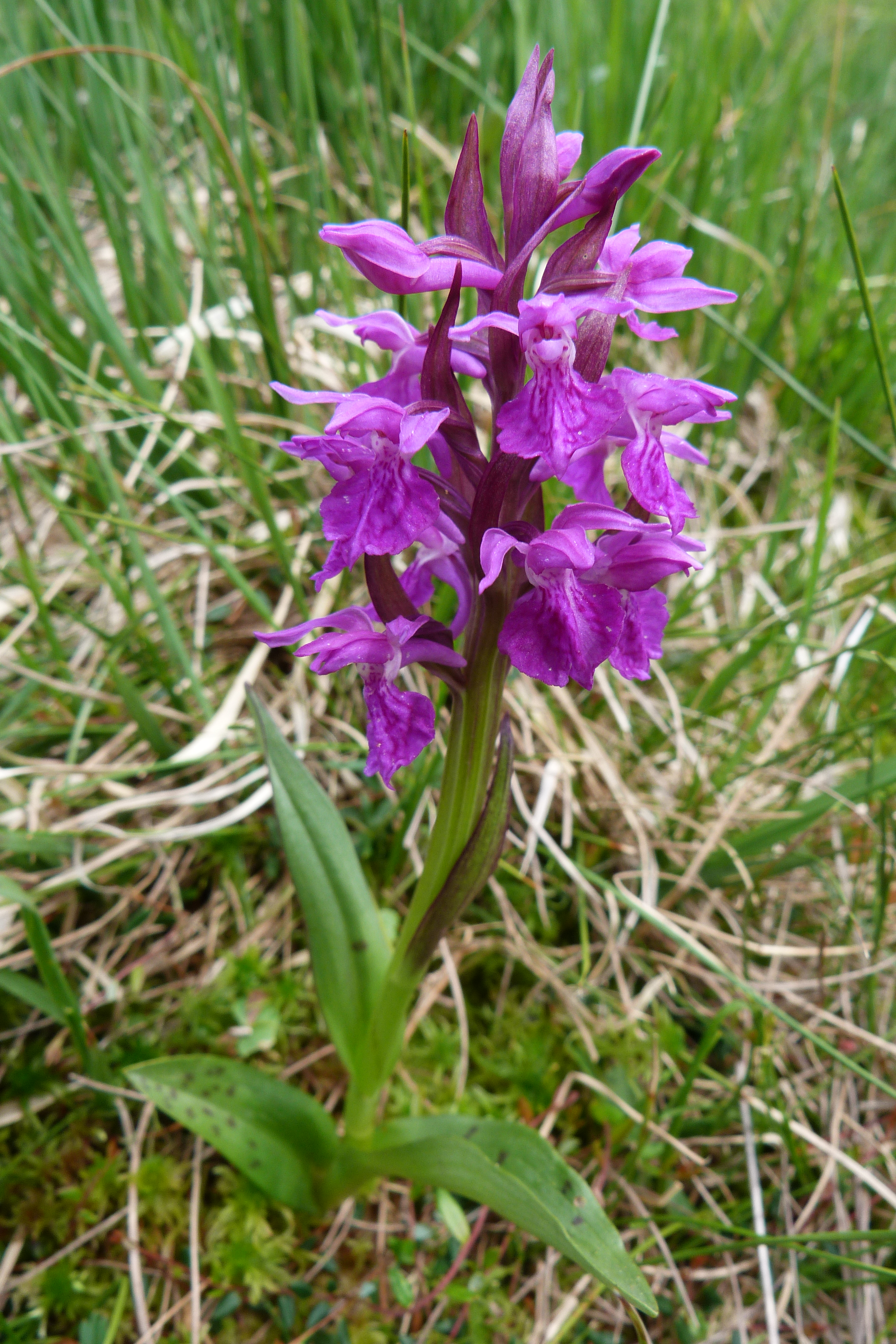
Broad-leaved marsh orchid, La Bresse.

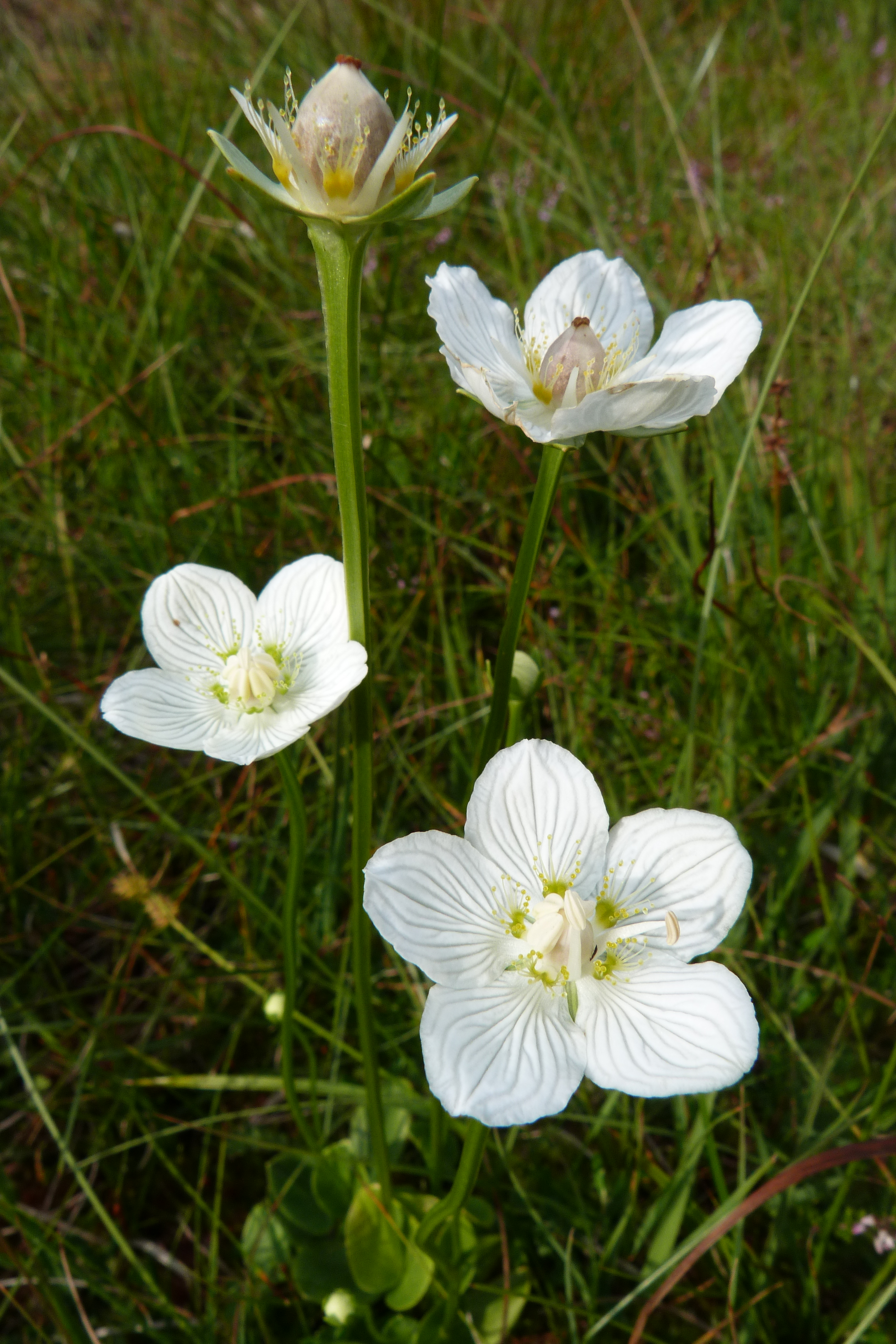
Marsh grass-of-Parnassus, La Bresse.

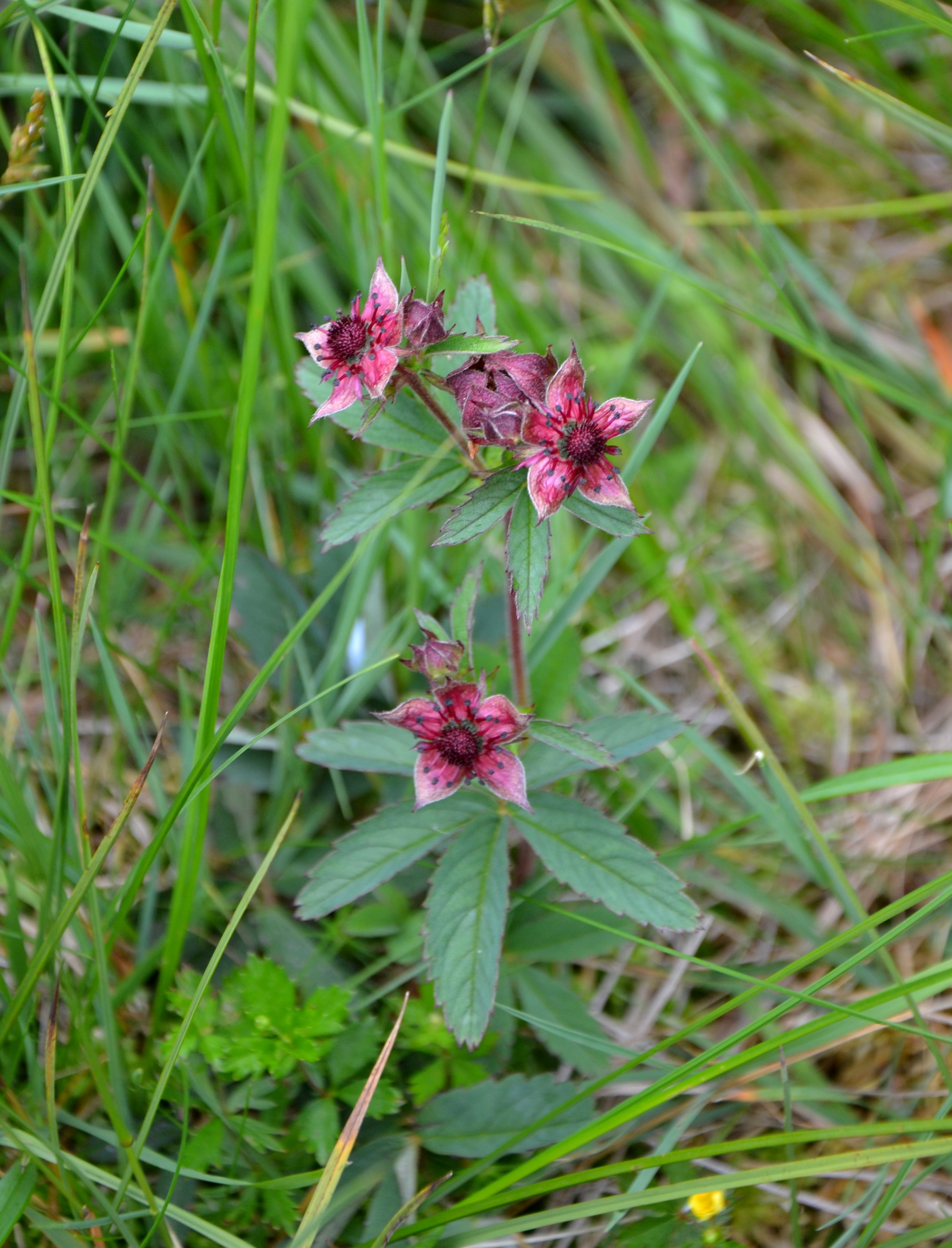
Marsh cinquefoil, La Bresse.

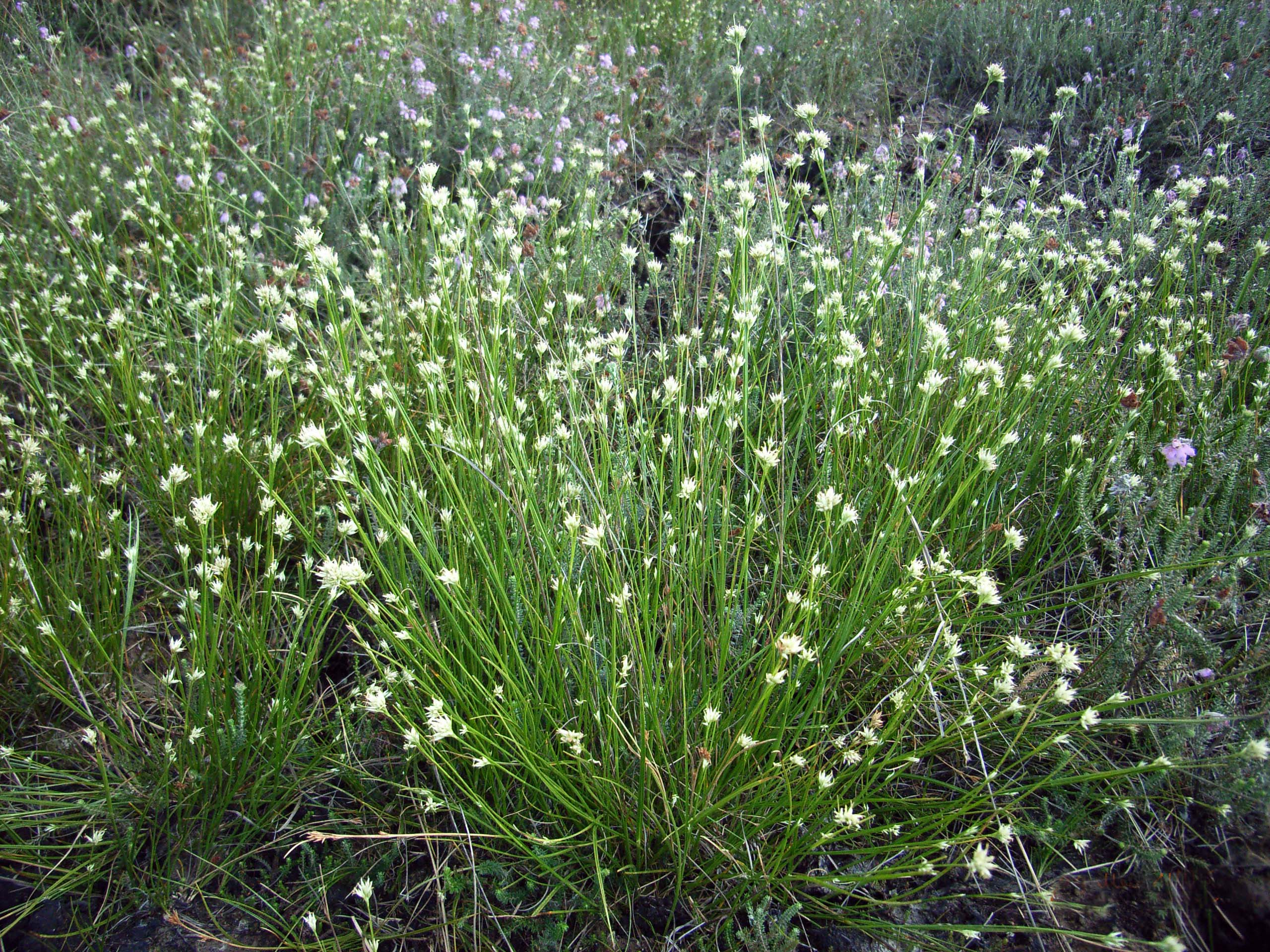
White beak-sedge.

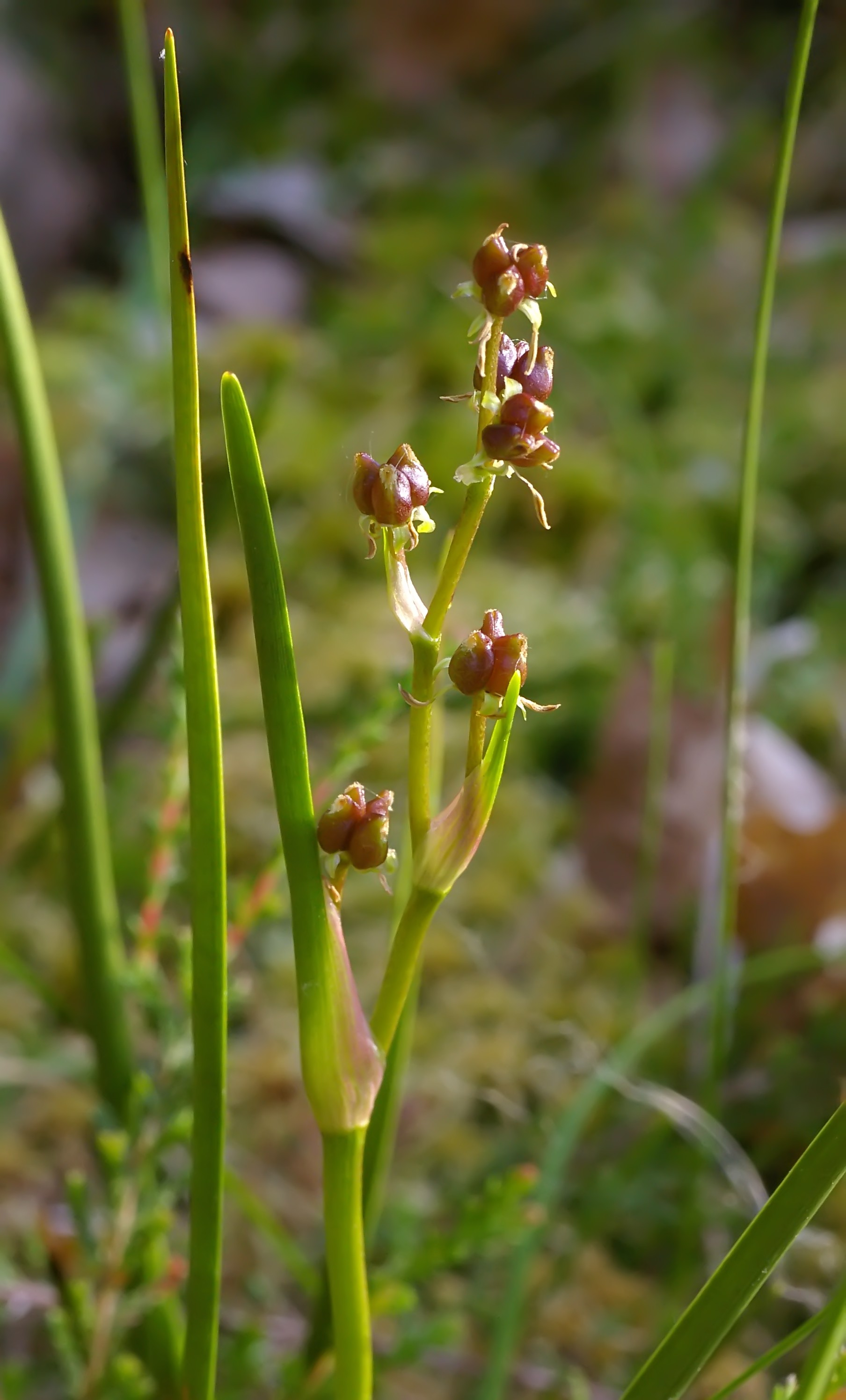
Pod grass.

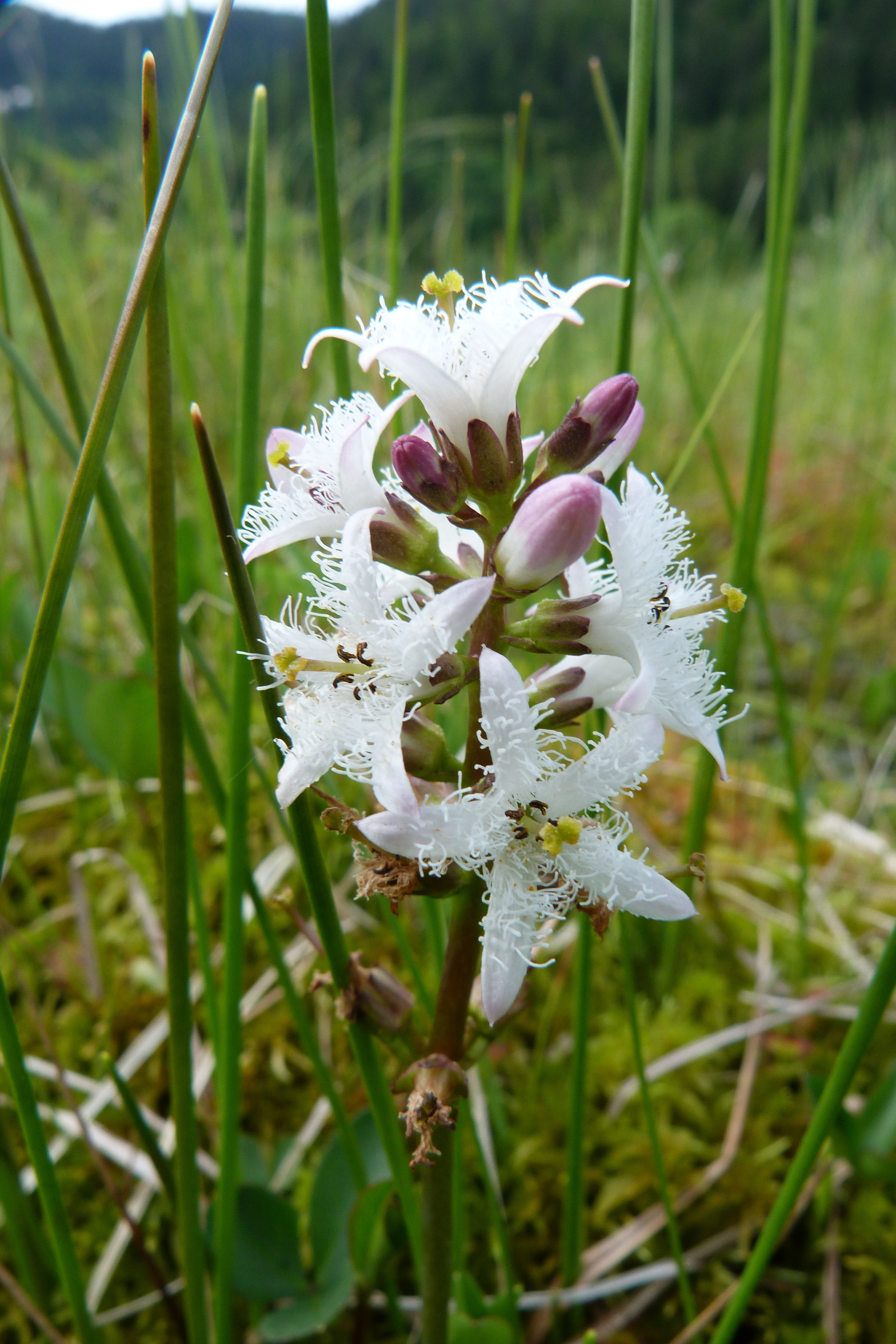
Bogbean, Lake Retournemer.

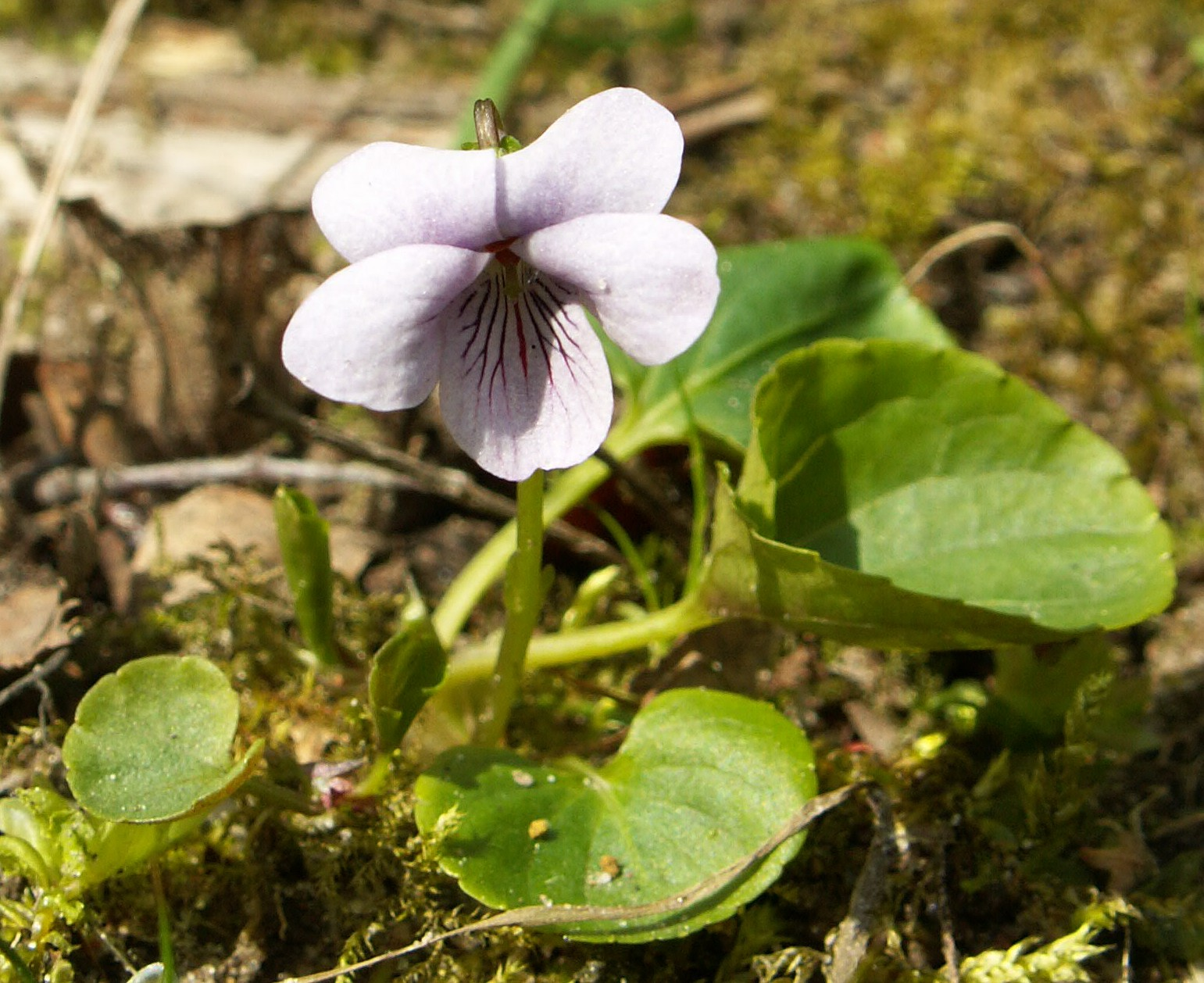
Marsh violet.

The accumulation of organic matter and the proliferation of sphagnum mosses contribute to the elevation of the peatland. Subsequently, the peatland is sustained solely by precipitation, the sphagnum mosses become scarce, and other plant species emerge, including tufted bulrush (Trichophorum cespitosum), purple moor-grass (Molinia caerulea), and water avens (Geum rivale). The flora of the region includes species such as hare's-tail cottongrass (Eriophorum vaginatum), crowberry (Empetrum nigrum), bog bilberry (Vaccinium uliginosum), heather (Calluna vulgaris), and bog-rosemary (Andromeda polifolia). The driest areas are gradually colonized by trees relatively undemanding in terms of their environmental requirements. These include downy birches (Betula pubescens), Scots pines (Pinus sylvestris), and Norway spruces (Picea abies).

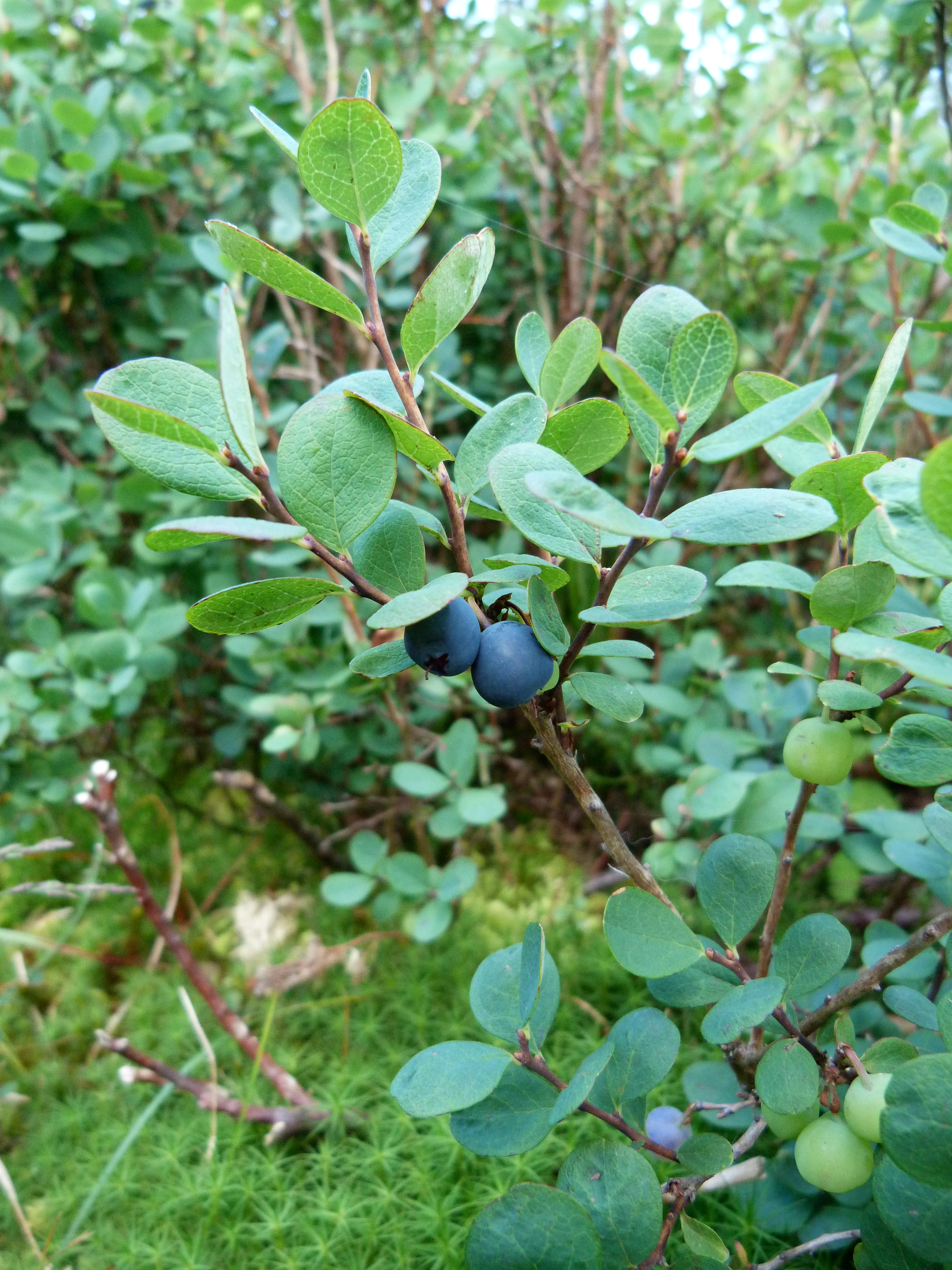
Bog bilberry, La Bresse.

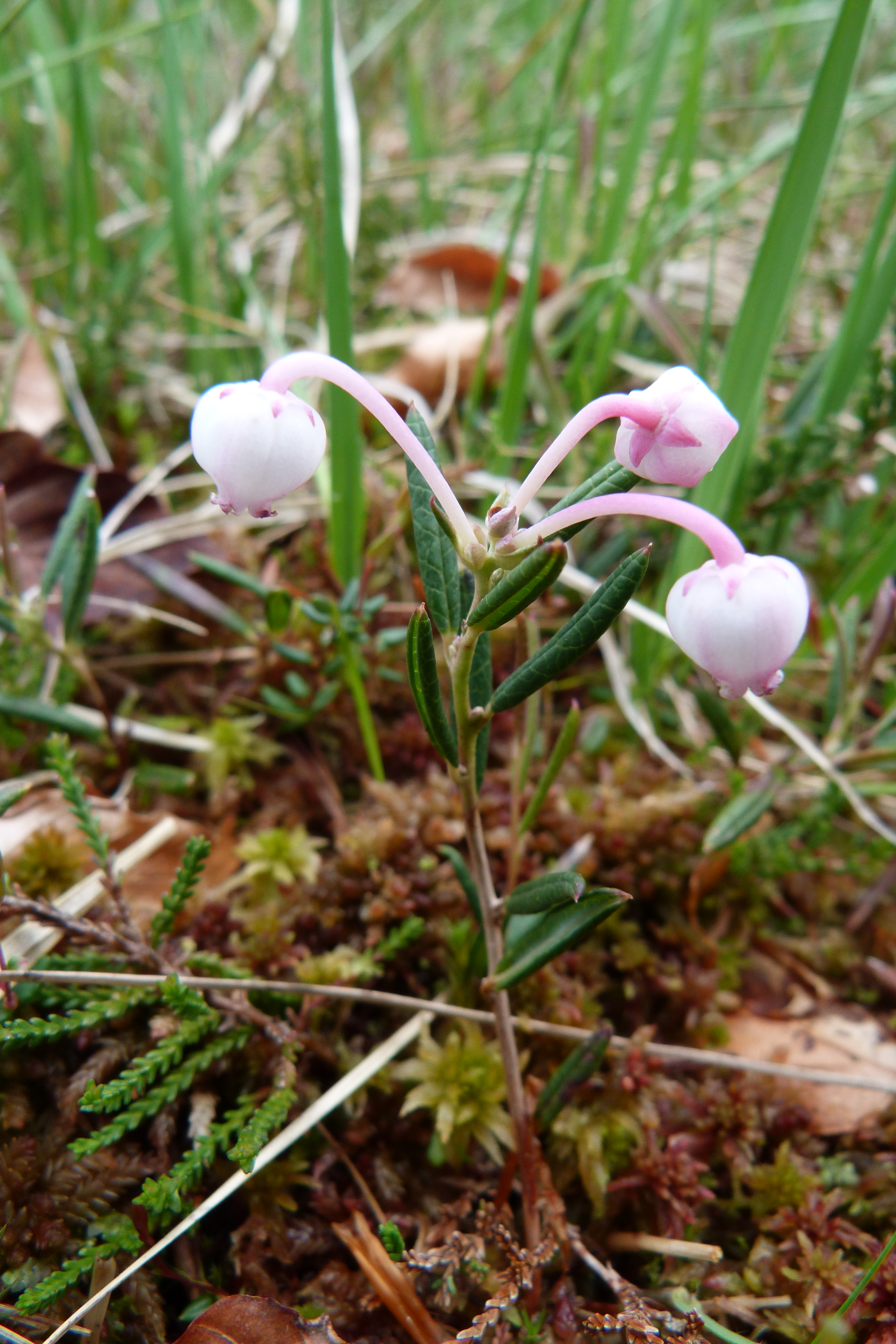
Bog-rosemary, La Bresse.

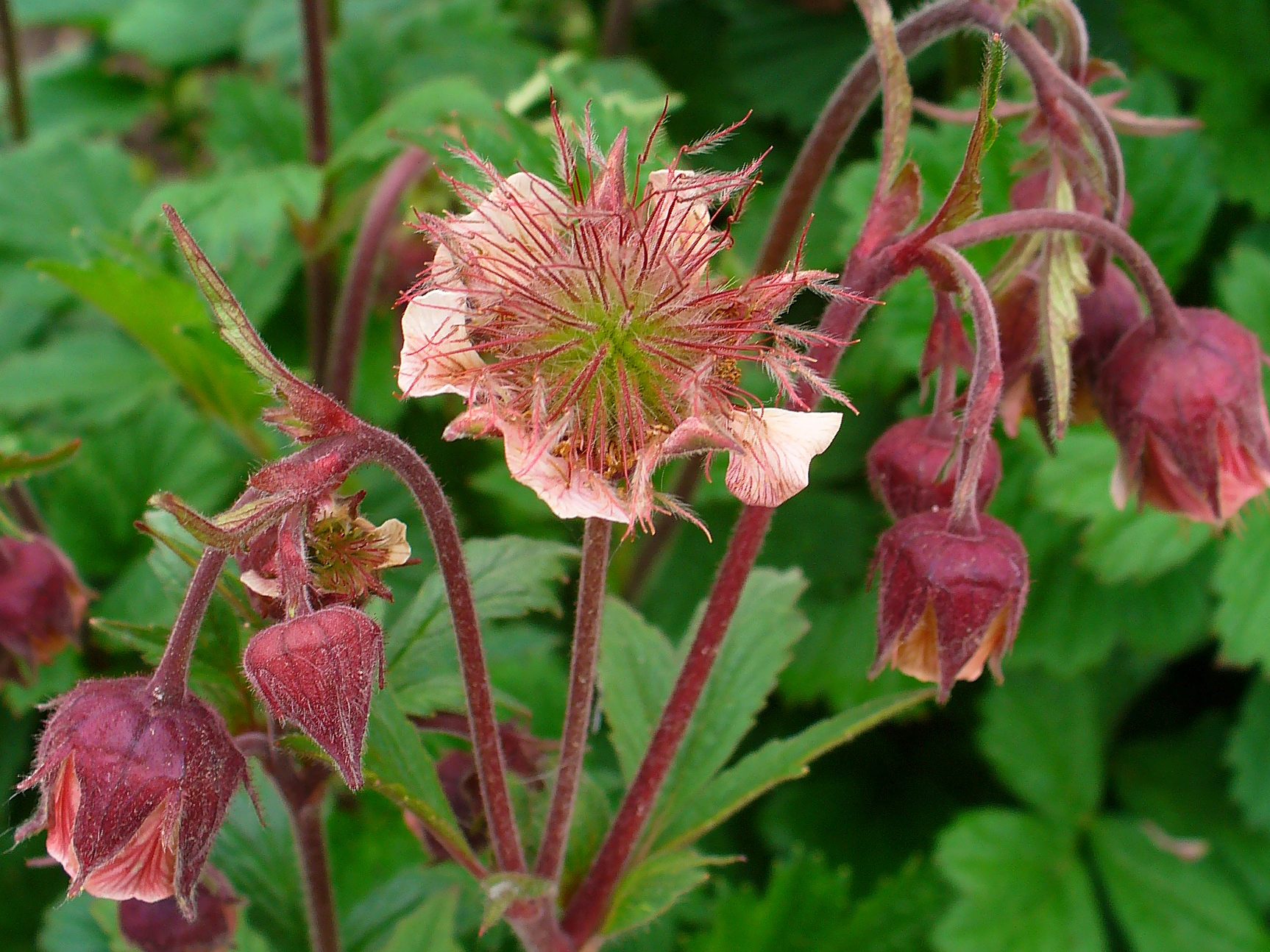
Water avens.

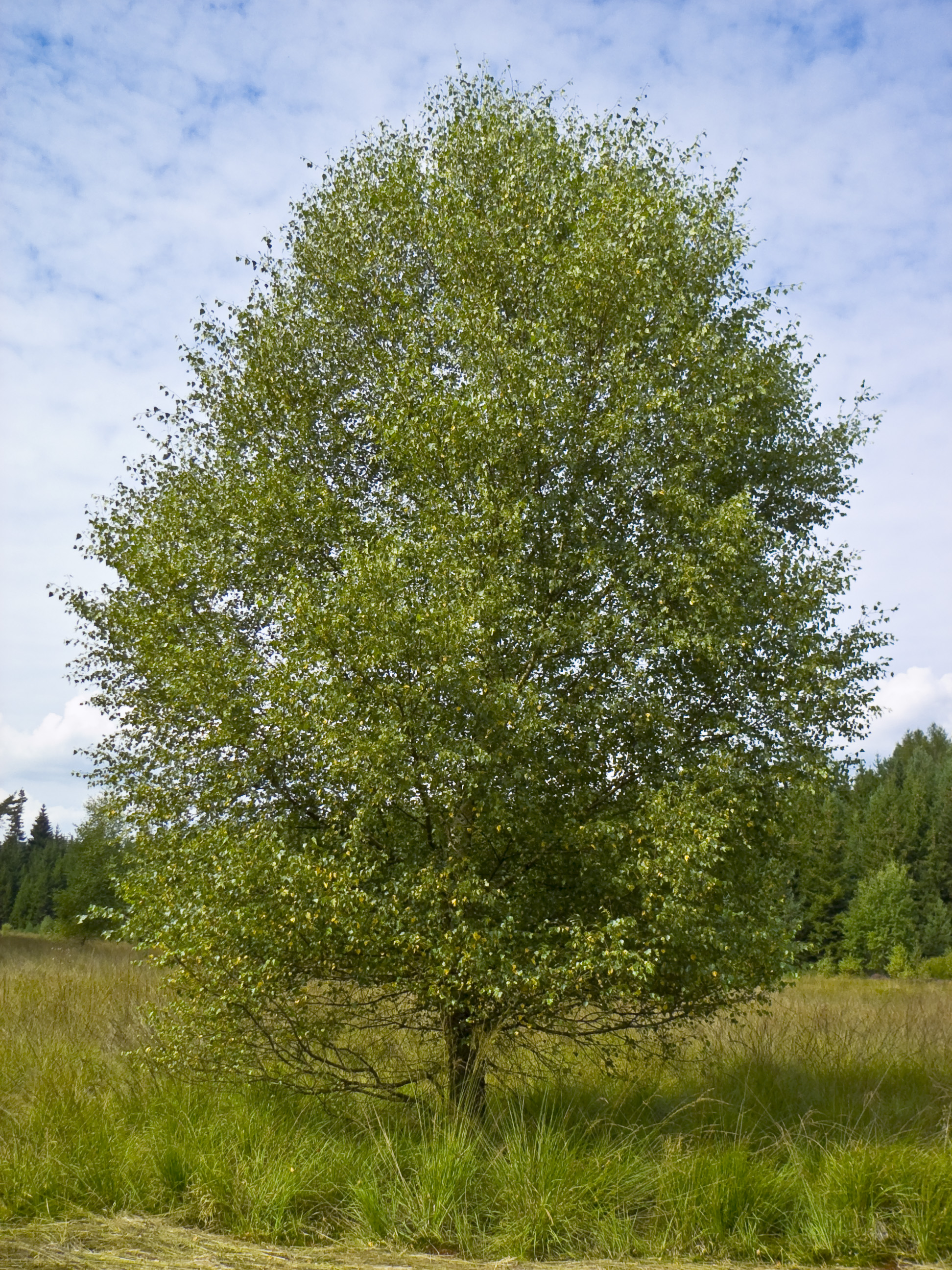
Downy birch.

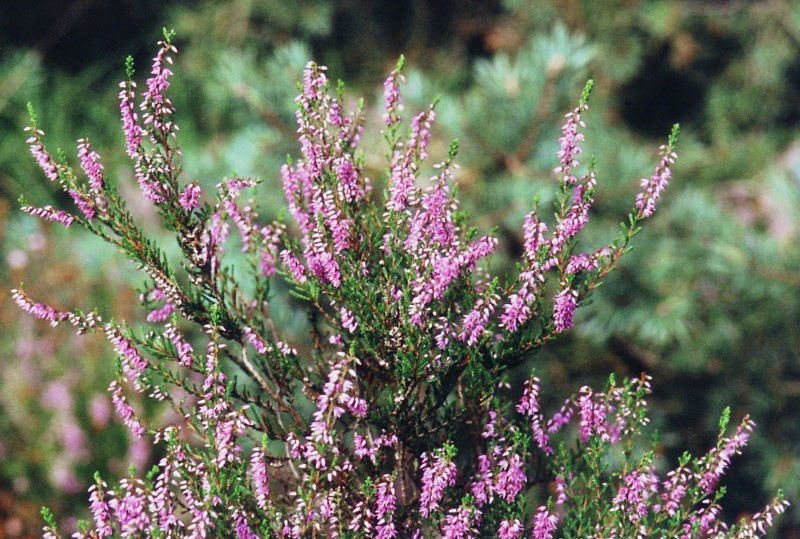
Heather.

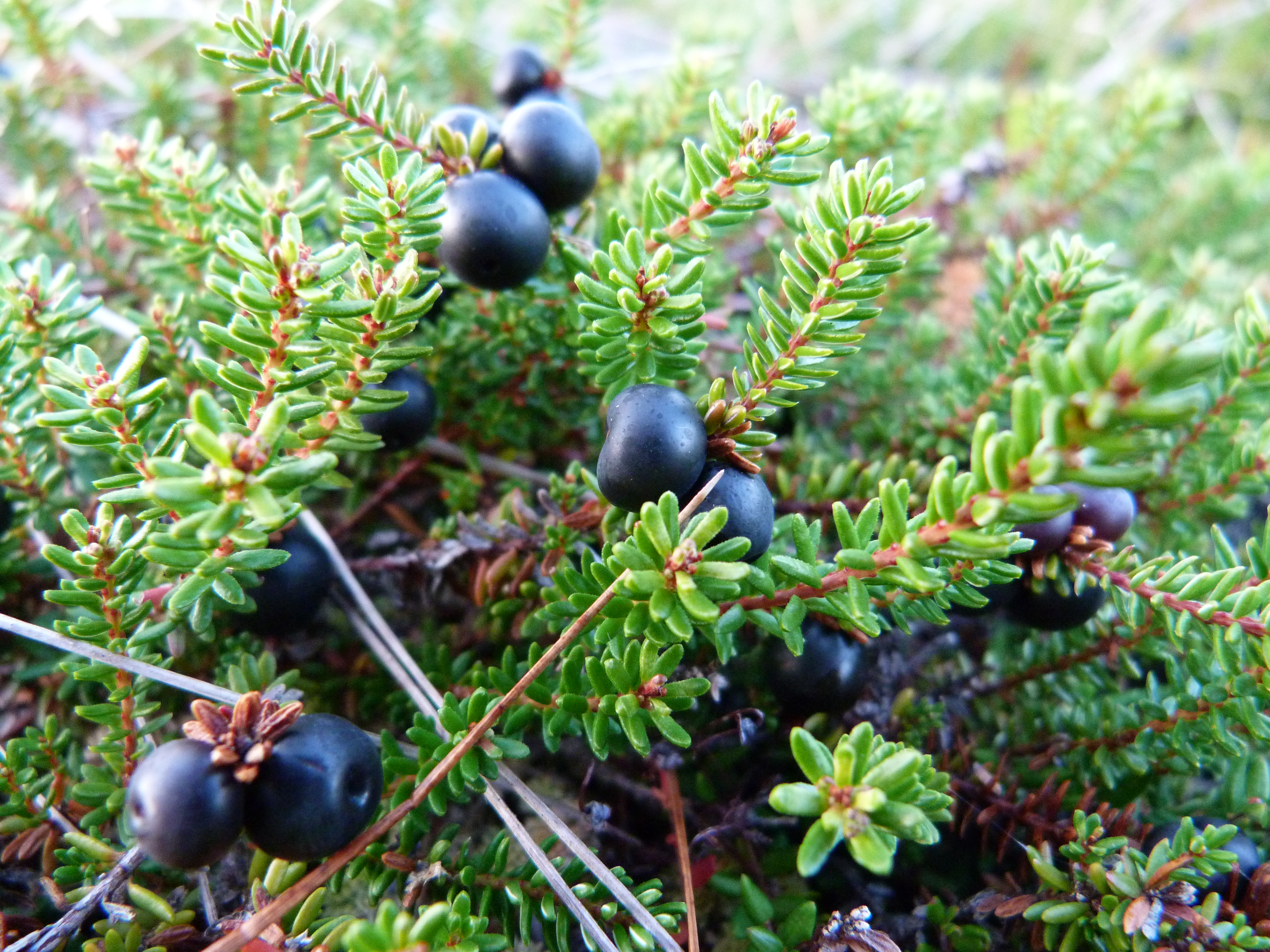
Crowberry, Tanet.

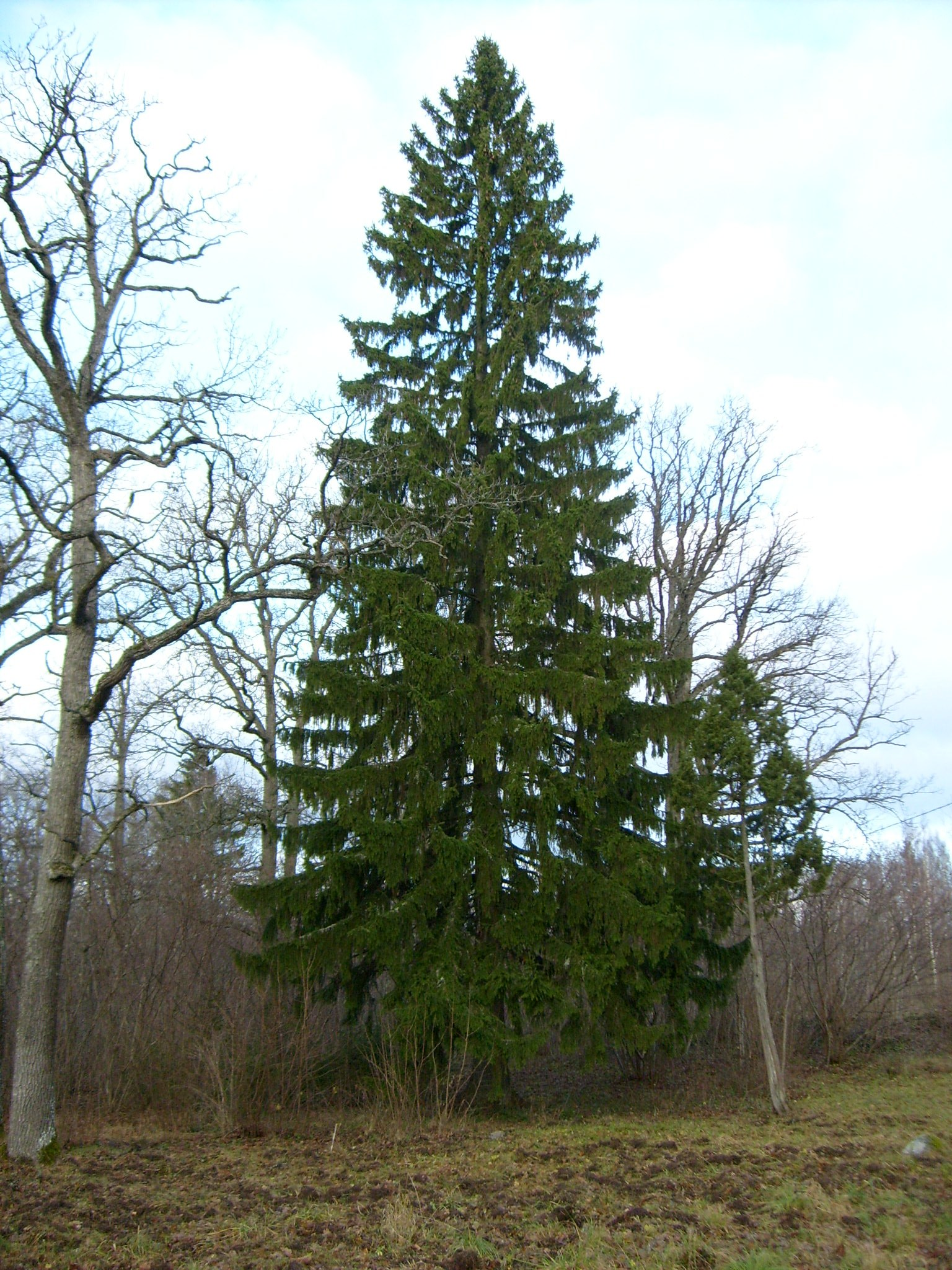
Norway spruce.

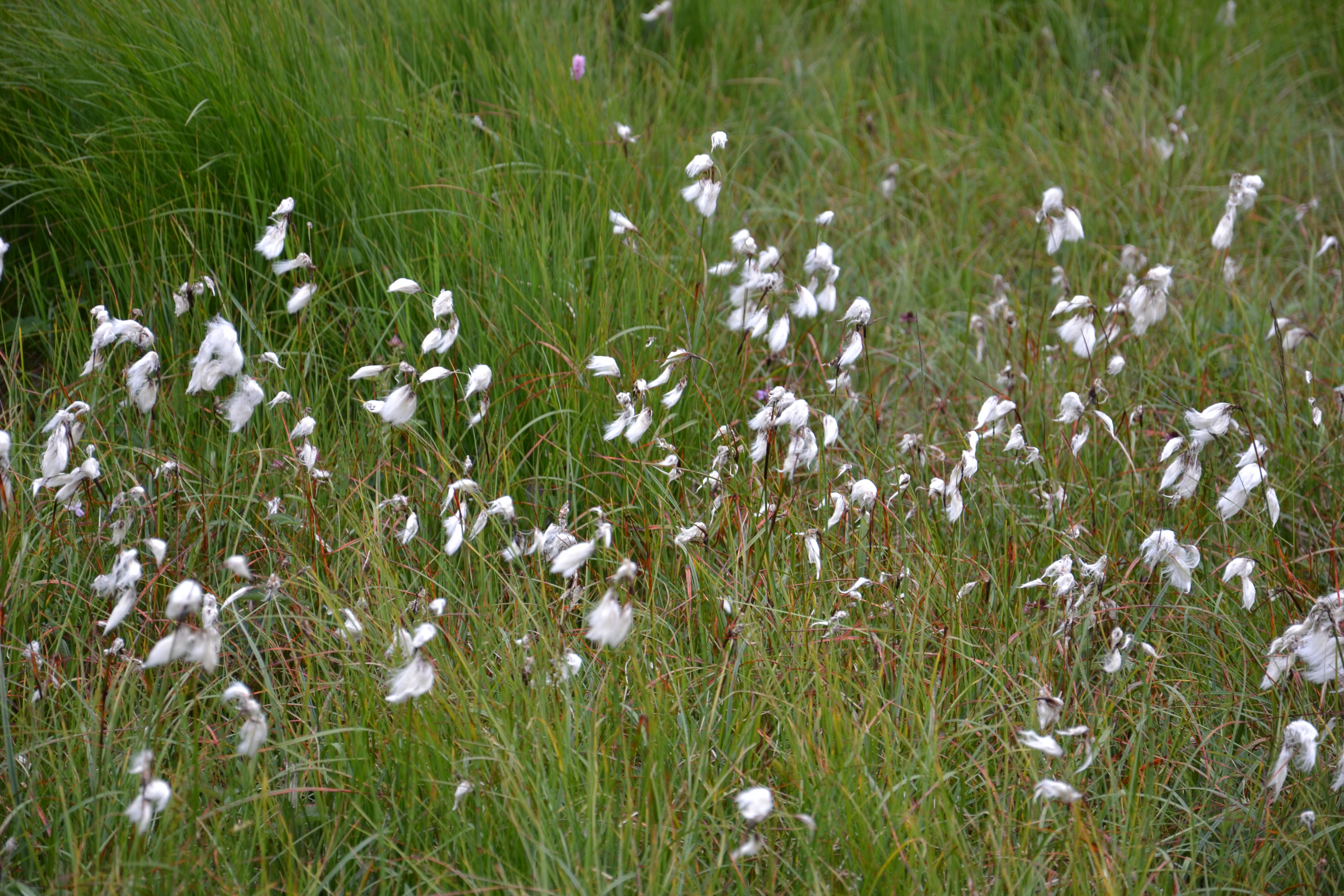
Hare's-tail cottongrass, La Bresse.

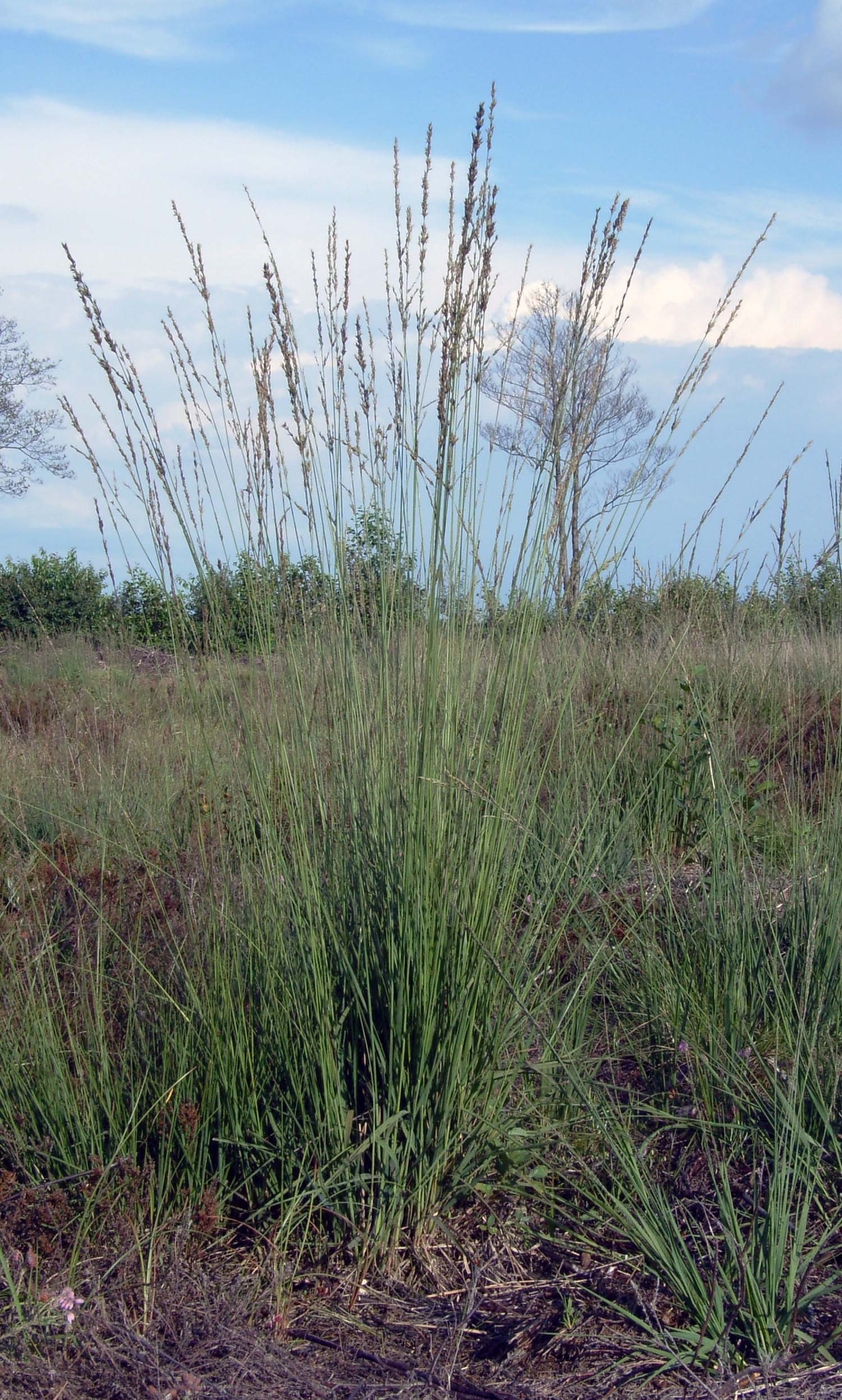
Purple moor-grass.

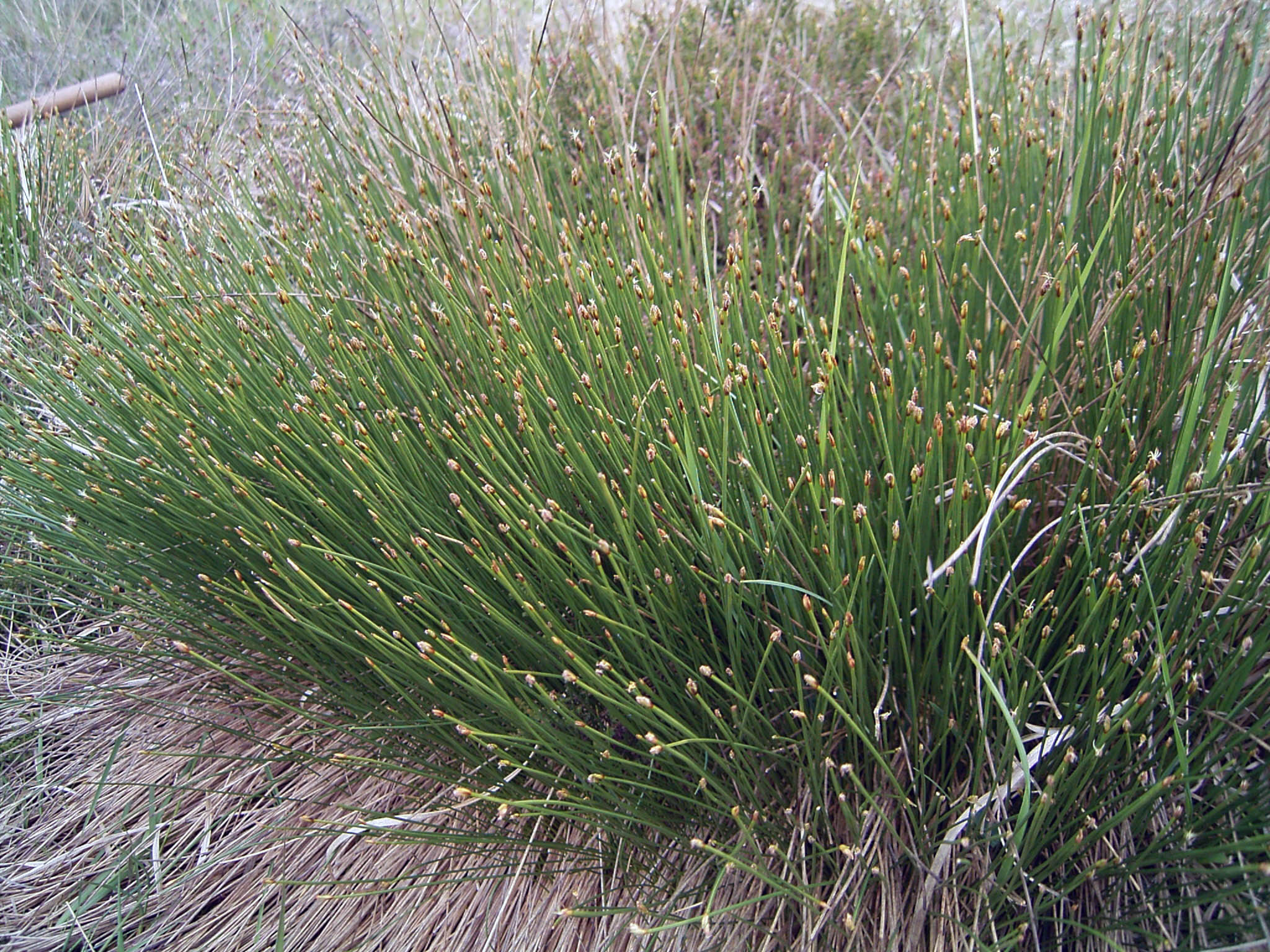
Tufted bulrush.

Some peatland sites have been identified within the Vosges massif, including three of particular significance and situated within the commune of La Bresse: Lake Lispach, Lake Blanchemer, and Machais Pond. Additionally, there are notable peatlands within the Vosges saônoises, such as the Grande Pile peatland (Note: This bog is located in the collinean zone; altitude: approximately 300 meters.) in Saint-Germain and those within the Ballons Comtois nature reserve.

==== Open spaces ====
===== Meadows =====
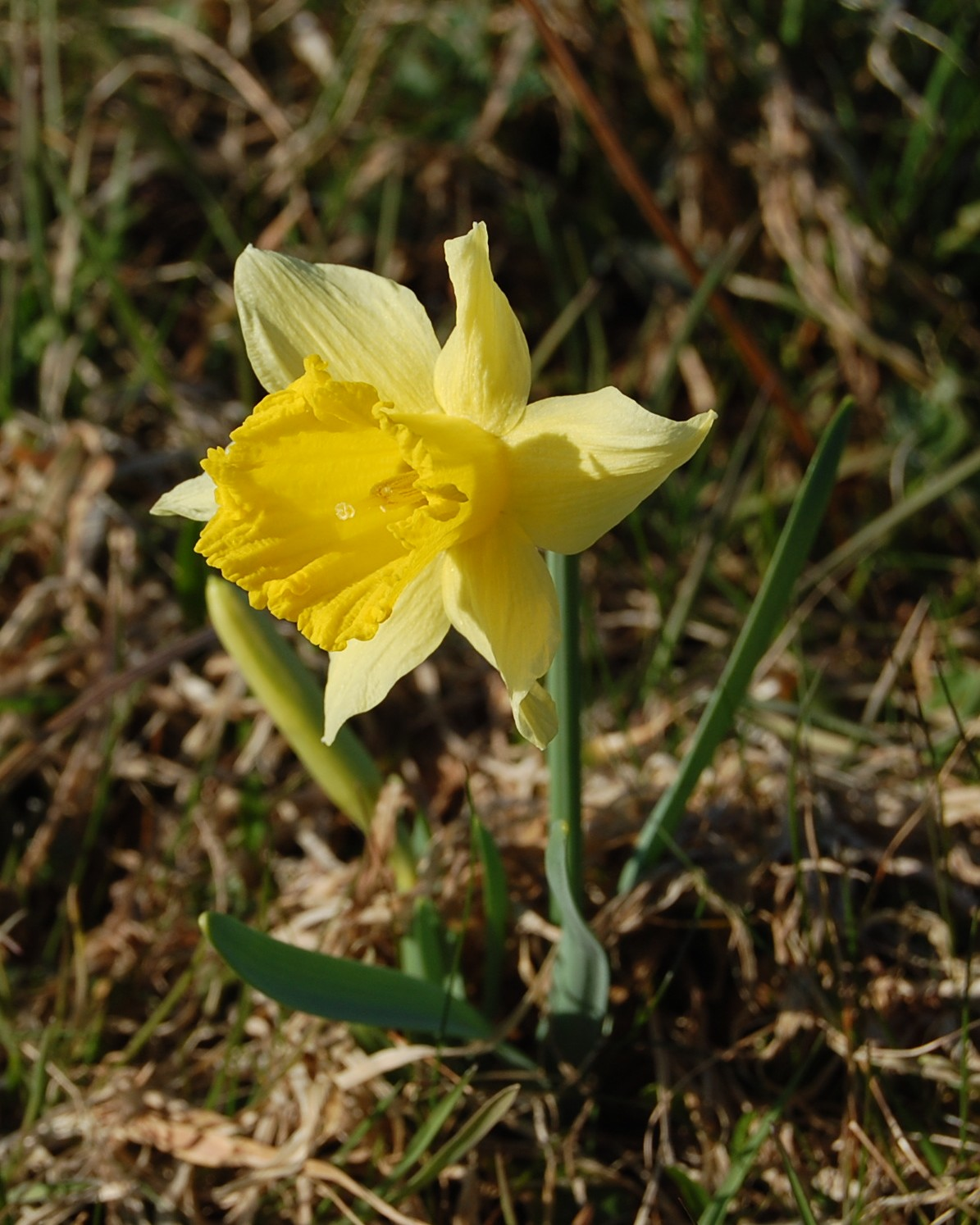
Daffodil, Le Tholy.

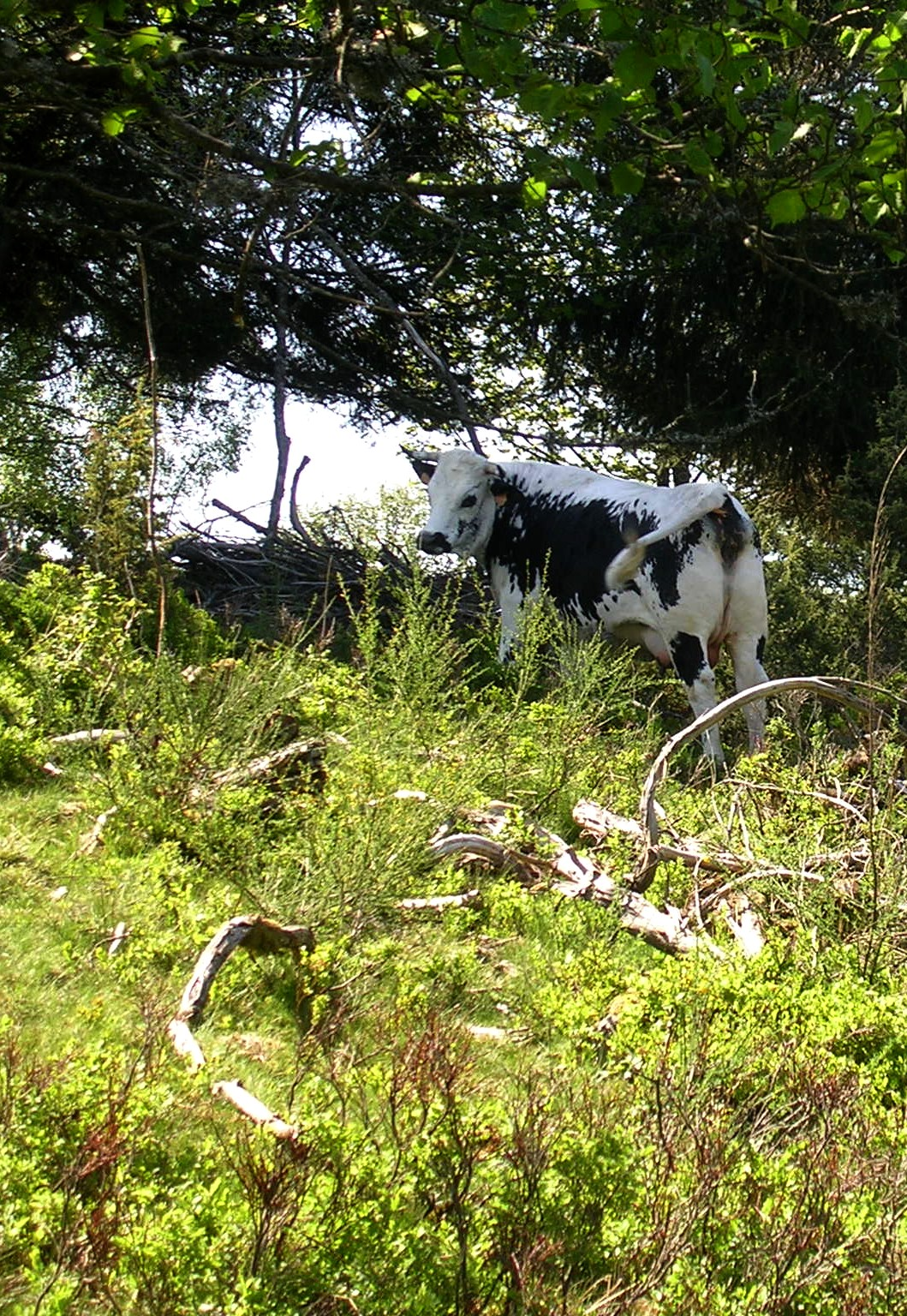
Vosges cows are well adapted to difficult terrain and rough forage, Le Tholy.

In areas with altitudes below 1,200 meters, the open spaces are not a natural phenomenon; rather, they were created by humans. These spaces are known as flower meadows, which contain grasses that are typical of meadows in the temperate European zone, including red fescue (Festuca rubra), common bent (Agrostis capillaris), and smooth meadow-grass (Poa pratensis).

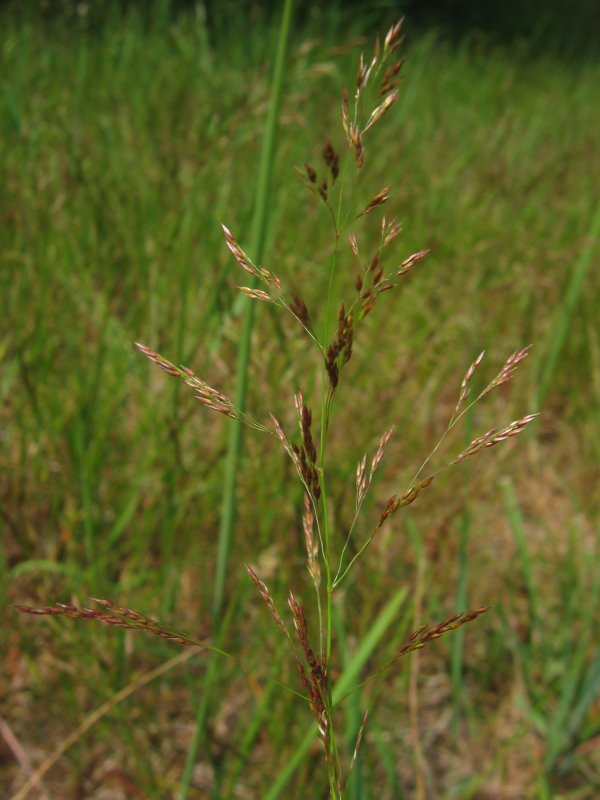
Common bent.

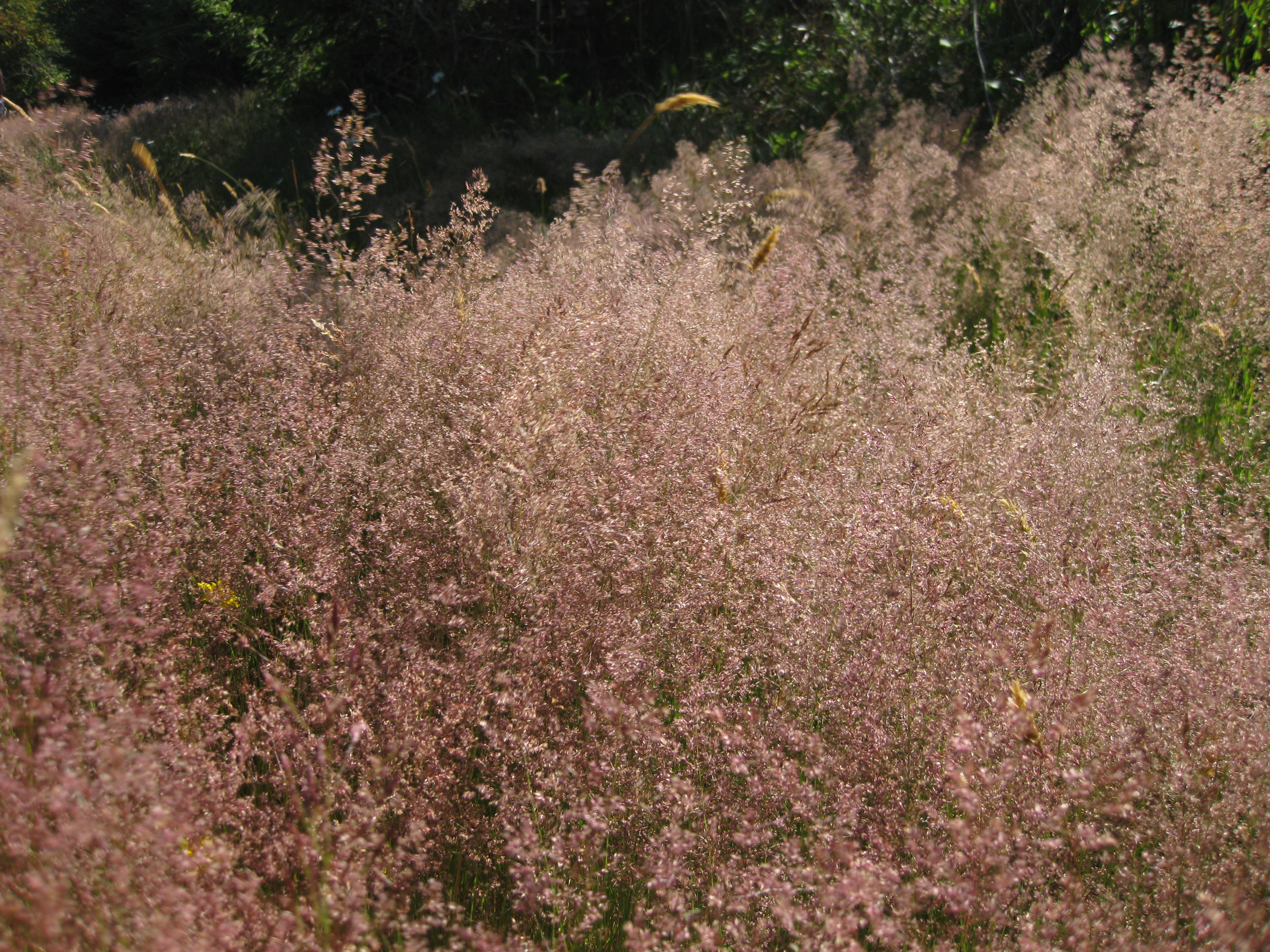
Red fescue.

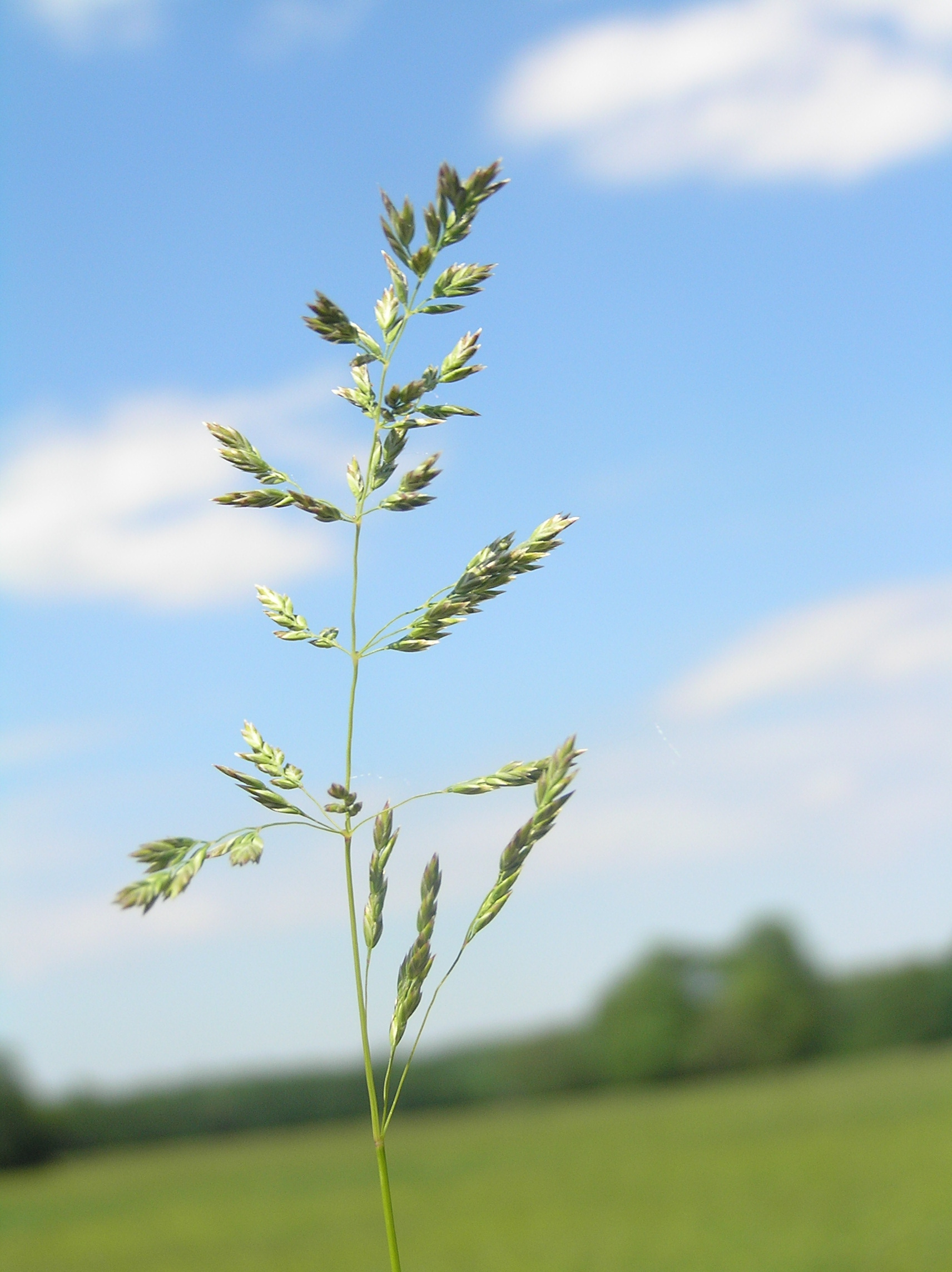
Smooth meadow-grass.

In the meadows, the wild daffodil (Note: Strictly speaking, the name jonquil is reserved for Narcissus jonquilla, which grows in the Mediterranean region.) or yellow narcissus (Narcissus pseudonarcissus) flowers in the spring (March–April), producing impressive displays of yellow flowers that blanket entire meadows. Additionally, daffodils are present in the undergrowth, though in lesser quantities and typically at the forest edge. Despite its toxicity, this bulbous plant has historically been utilized by farmers in the Vosges region due to its lack of toxicity to livestock, including the local breed of cows. The narcissus is not grazed. Furthermore, the foliage is no longer present by the time haymaking commences. The bulbs are interred beneath the roots of the grasses. The presence of daffodils does not result in any observable deterioration of the hay meadows. Furthermore, the bulbs contribute to stabilizing soil in meadows adjacent to streams. The plant is sufficiently abundant to allow the organization of a Daffodil Festival every two years in the town of Gérardmer. The event involves a parade of floats decorated with daffodils. However, it is essential to remain vigilant about the conservation of this species because the picking is not regulated, and the urbanization of certain areas is causing the disappearance of hectares of daffodil meadows. Subsequently, the cuckooflower (Cardamine pratensis) will bloom with pink flowers, while the field forget-me-not (Myosotis arvensis) will bloom with bright blue flowers. During the period between late spring and early summer, the presence of different orchids can be observed. The early-purple orchid (Orchis mascula) is the earliest to bloom, beginning in May with dark violet flowers that occasionally display pink tones. The greater butterfly-orchid (Platanthera chlorantha) then emerges, exhibiting a more subtle presence with its greenish-white flowers. Finally, in late June, the heath-spotted orchid (Dactylorhiza maculata) forms expansive colonies in wet meadows, displaying pink and white flowers. In wet meadows, the bistort (Bistorta officinalis) is also observed, exhibiting pink flowers that are shaped like a toothbrush.

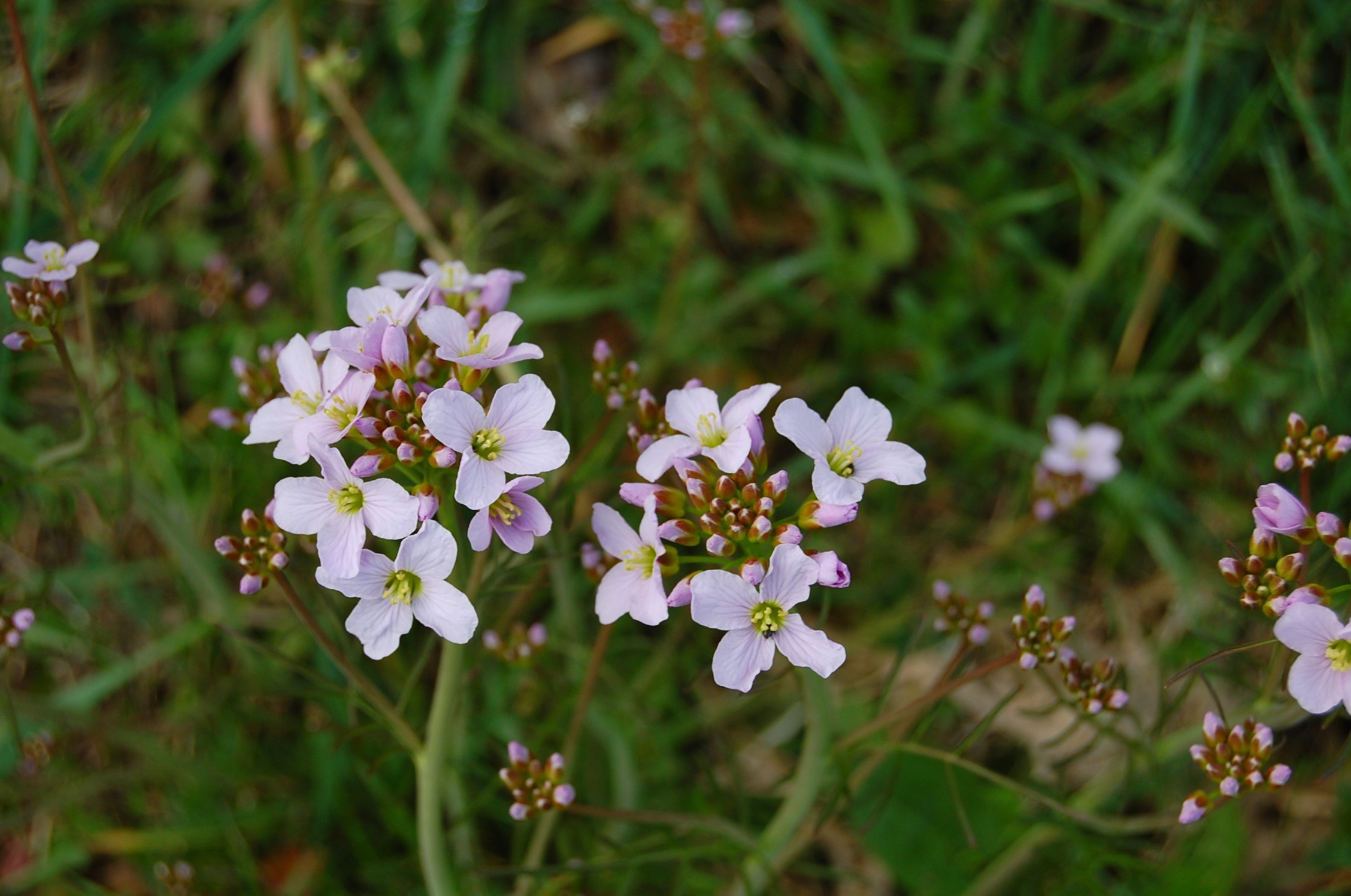
Cuckooflower, Le Tholy.

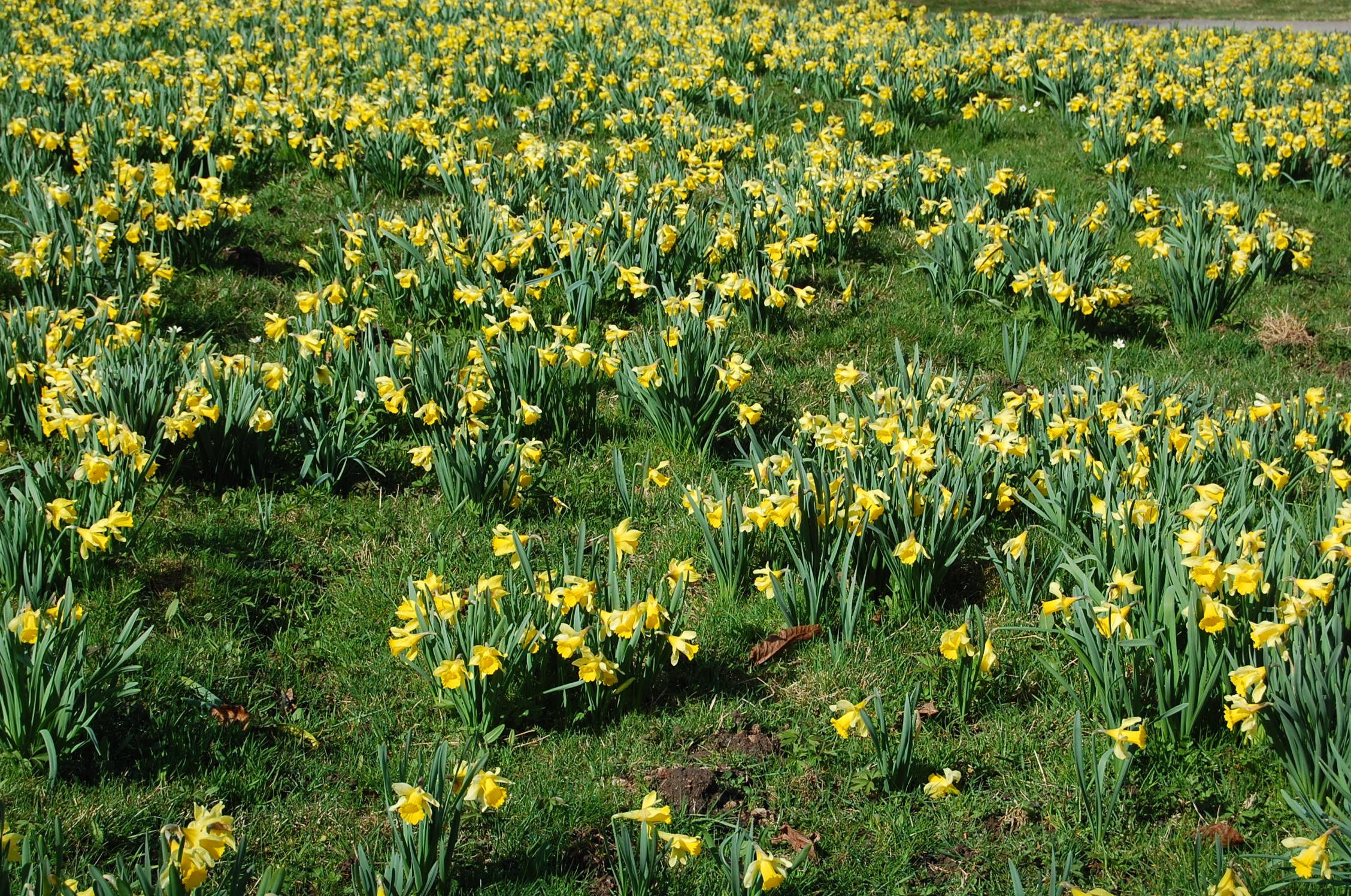
Meadow covered with wild daffodil, Le Tholy.

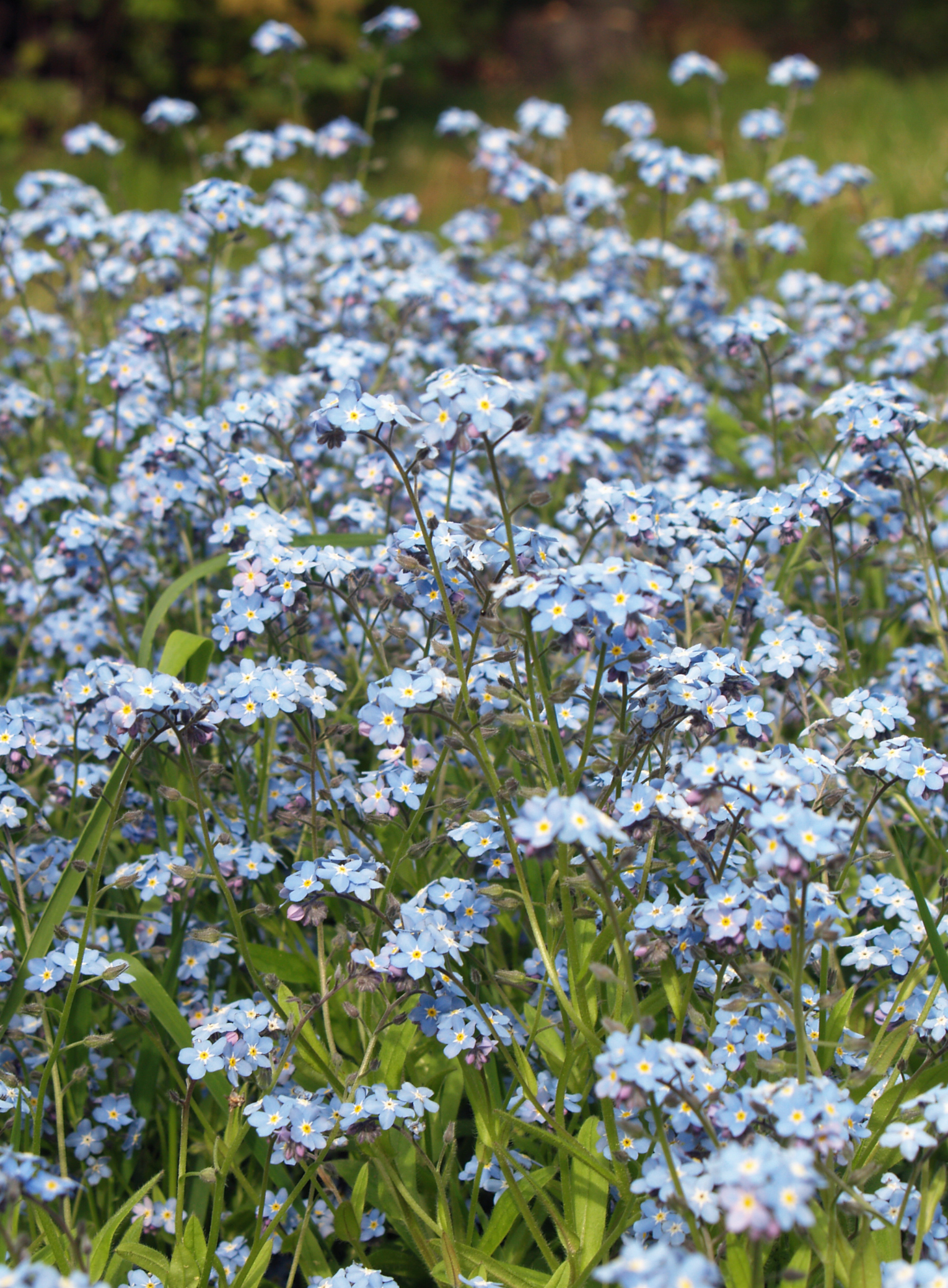
Field forget-me-not.

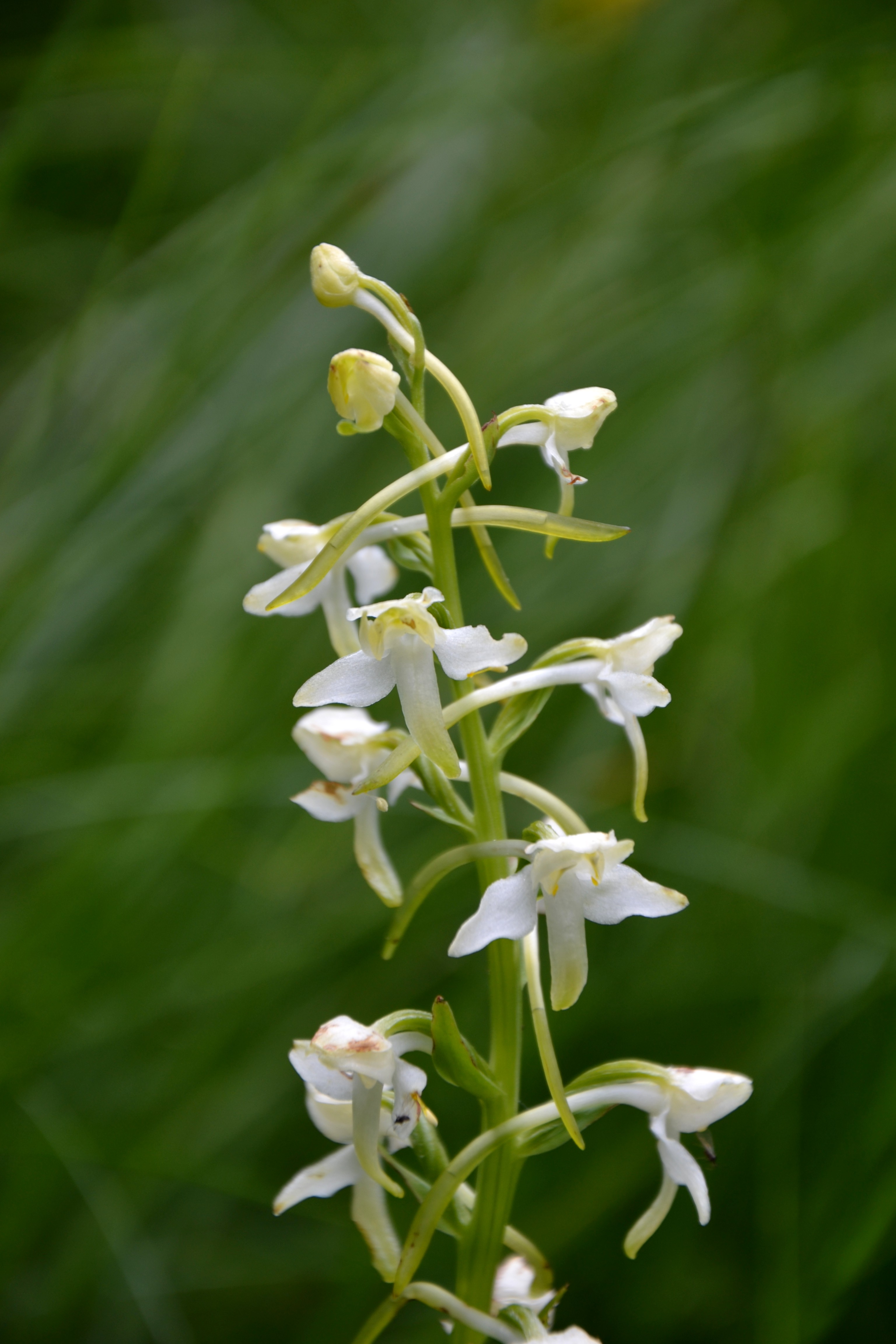
Greater butterfly-orchid, La Bresse.

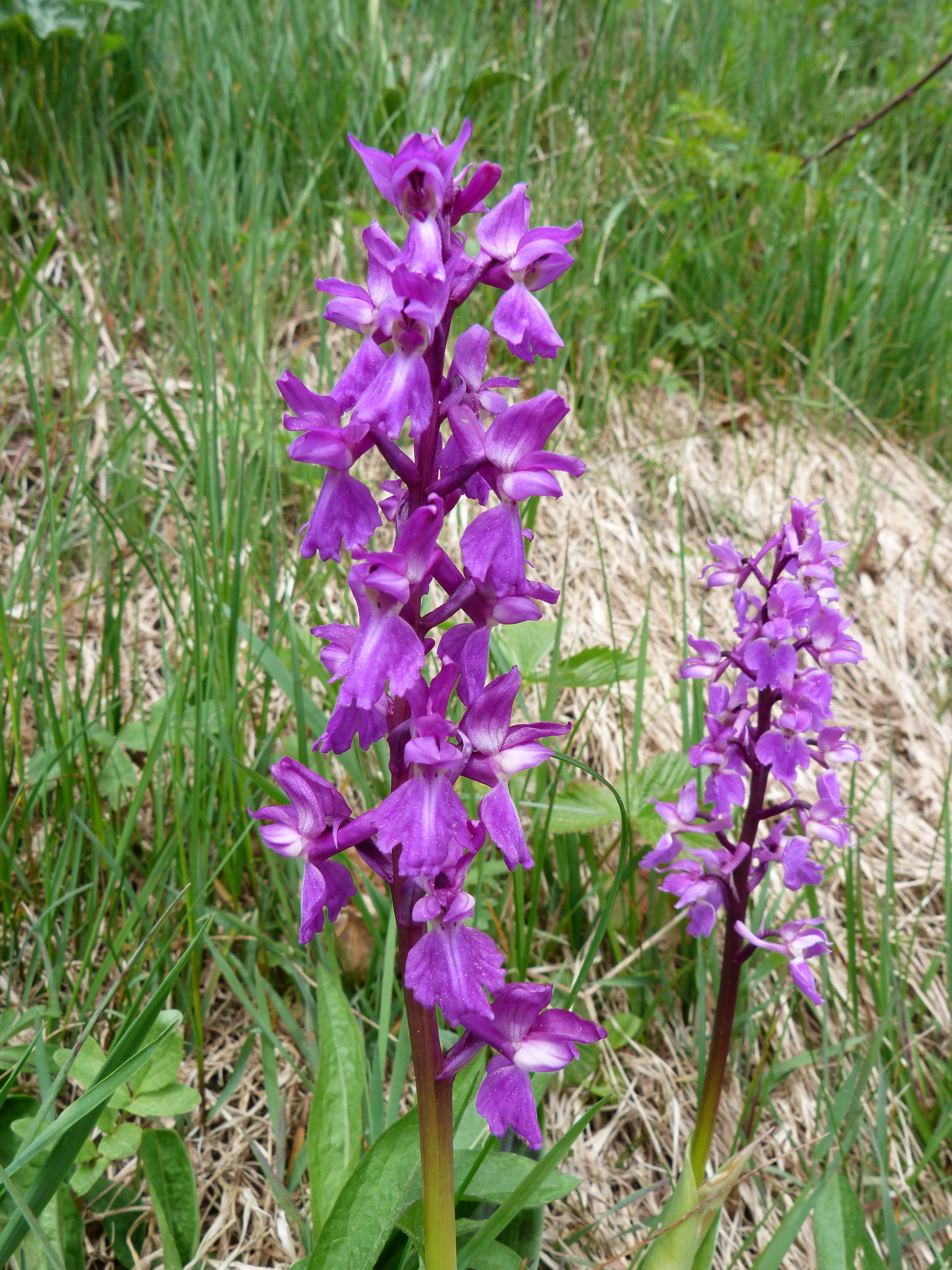
Early-purple orchid, Basse-sur-le-Rupt.

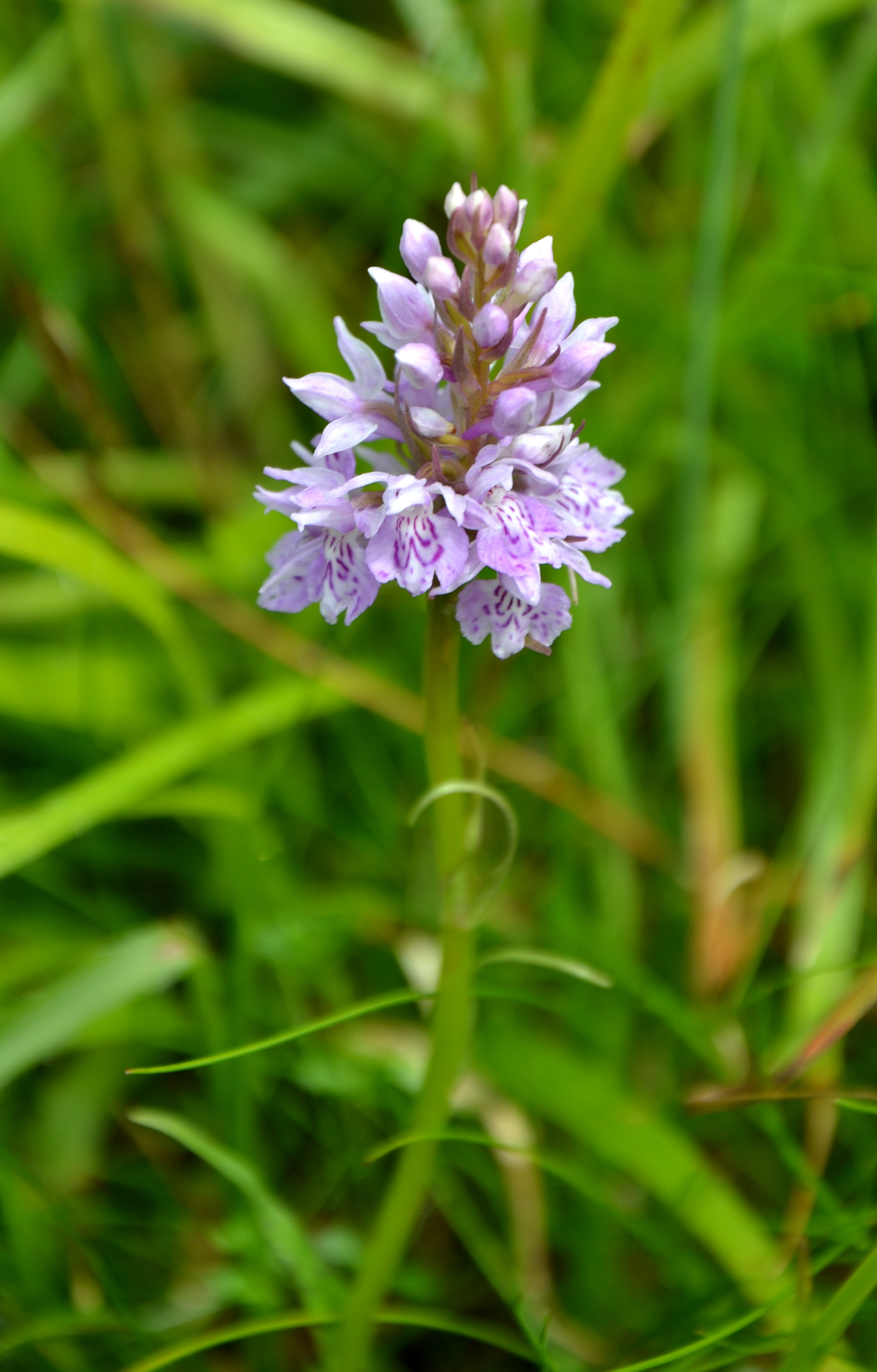
Spotted orchid, Xonrupt.

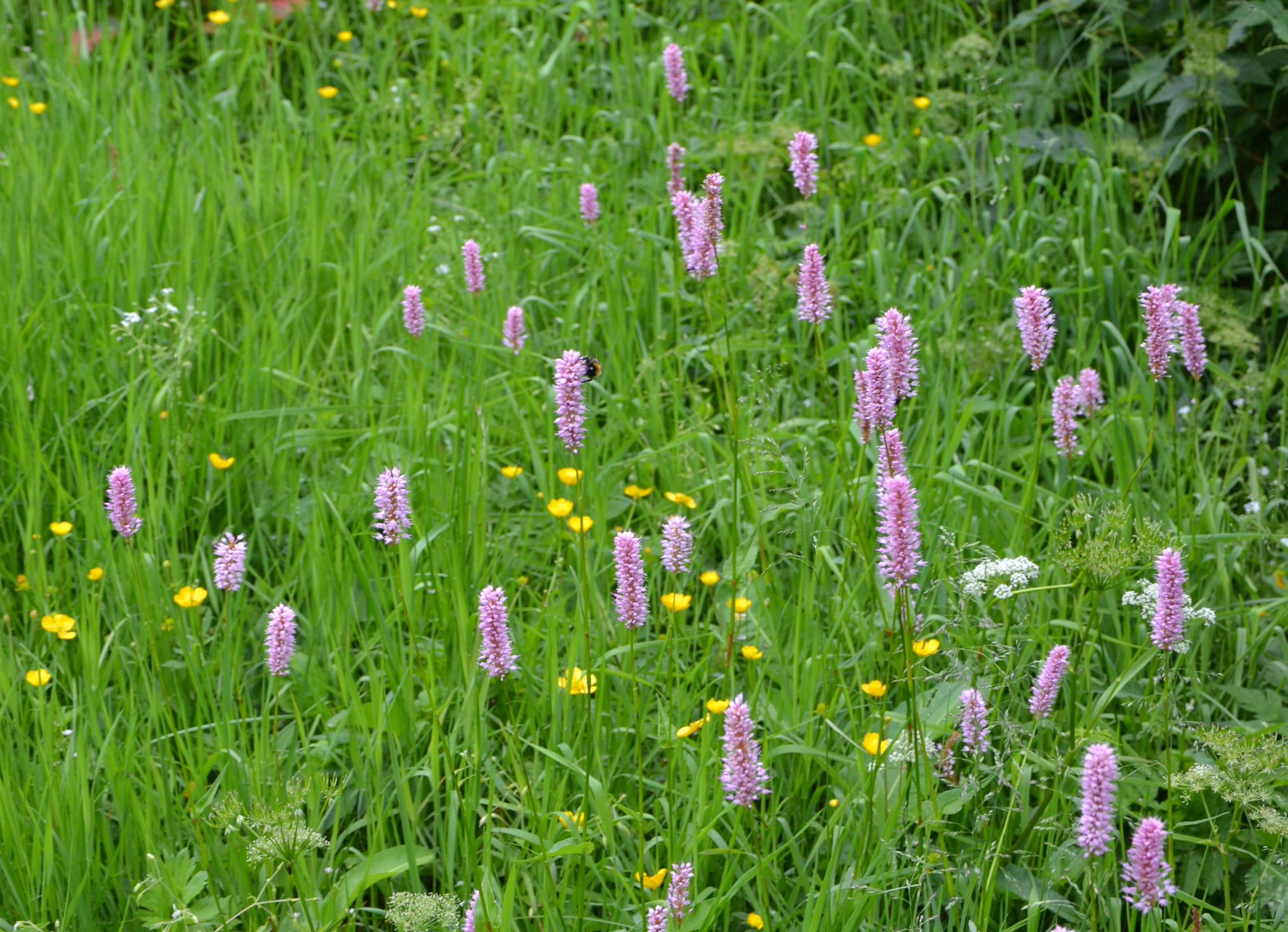
Bistort, La Bresse.

===== High pastures (subalpine zone) =====
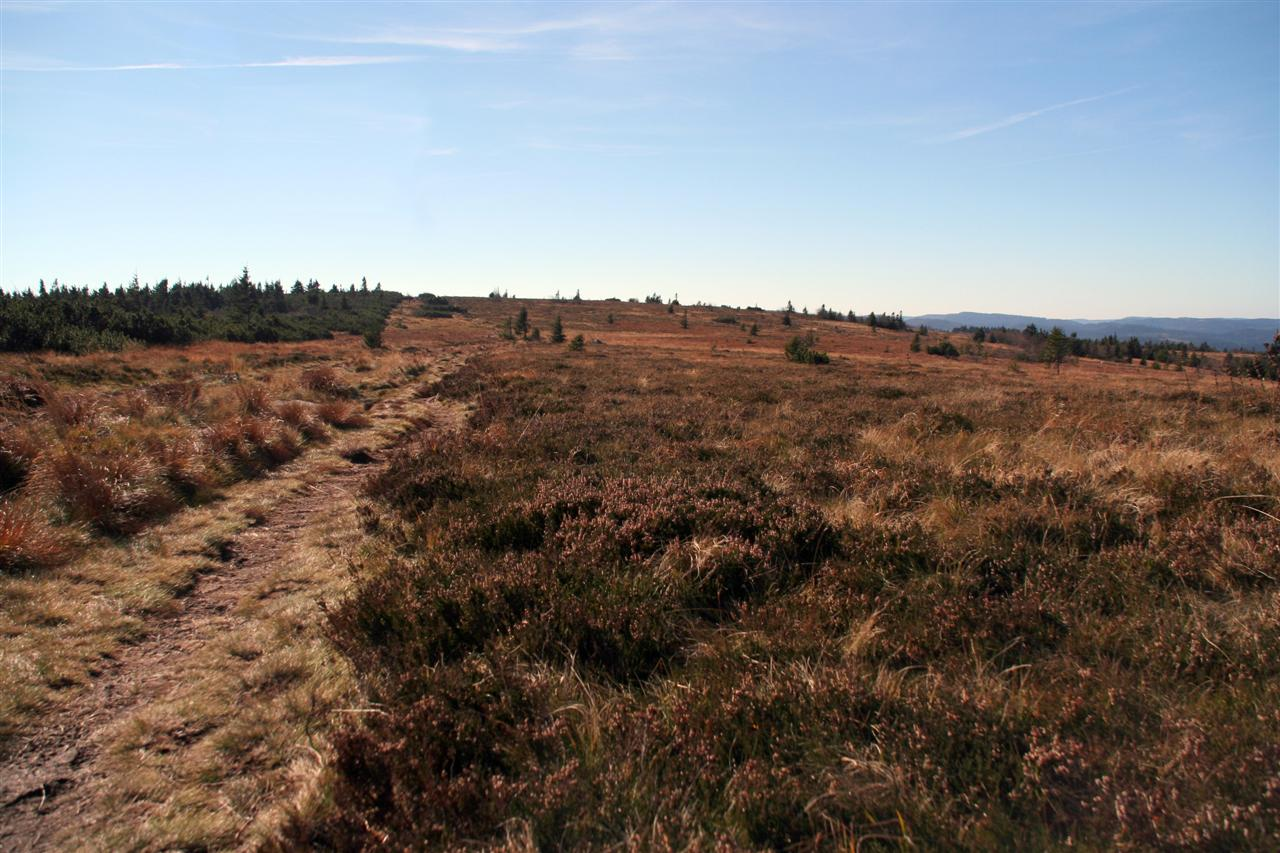
High thatch with callune heather on the Faing lawn.

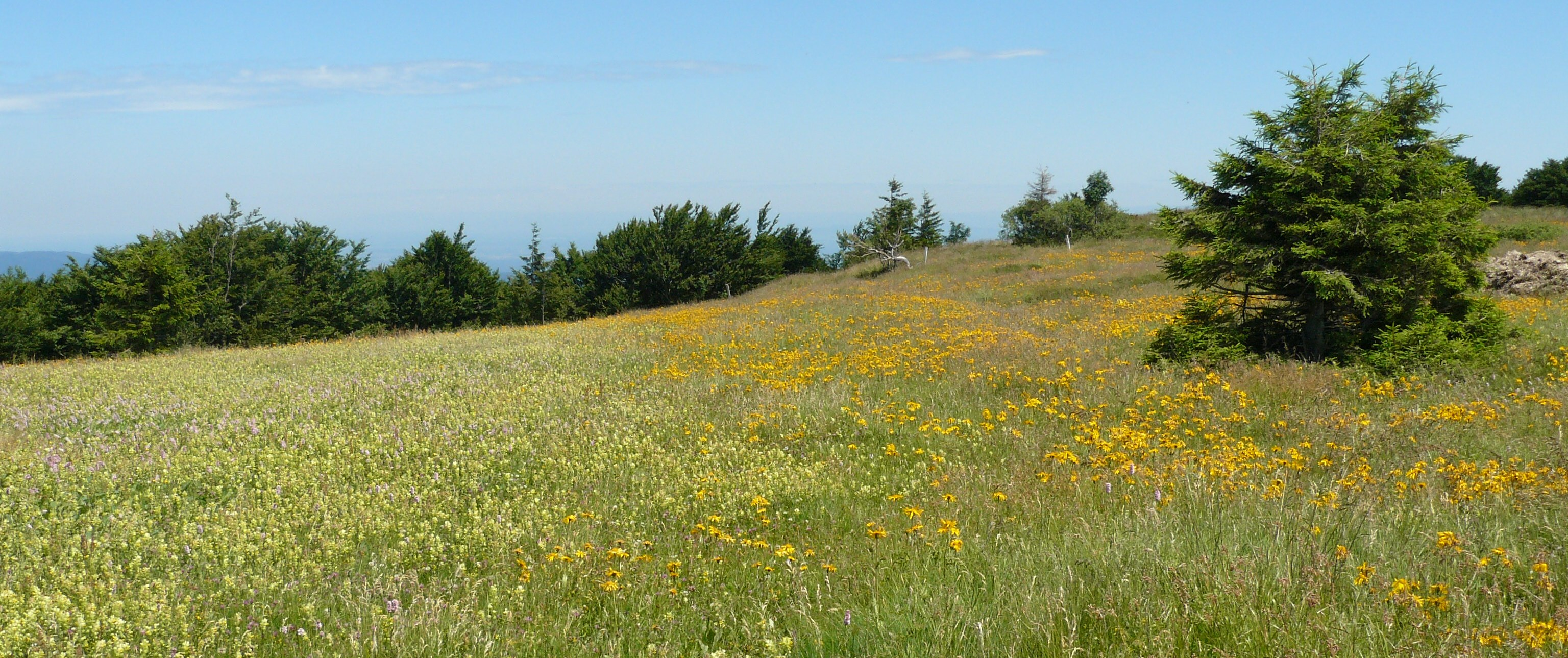
Yellow-orange mountain arnica on the right and pale yellow rhinanthus on the left, Markstein high thatch.

The high pastures are situated on a series of ridges, extending from Lusse (Vosges) in the north to the Ballon de Servance (Vosges and Haute-Saône) in the south. The ridge line is colloquially known as the "blue line of the Vosges." The flora that inhabits these summits, situated in the subalpine zone, must adapt to a range of challenging environmental conditions, including strong winds, low temperatures, snow, and prolonged sun exposure. By the end of the summer season, the flora comprises pastures, which are the hollow herbaceous stems of grasses, as well as under-shrubs. The feminine noun "chaume" (meaning high-altitude pasture) is derived not from the presence of the masculine noun "chaumes" (referring to the stems of grasses), but rather from the Latin word "calmis," which signifies a grazing area. The natural high pastures, designated as primary pastures (approximately 300 hectares), are situated on the most exposed summits, which are prone to wind and precipitation. The summits of the Ballons encompass 5,000 hectares of high pastures, most of which were formed through deforestation by humans beginning in the 8th century. These pastures are classified as secondary pastures. Nevertheless, the initial human impact on the pastures predates the 8th century. For instance, research indicates that the Rossberg massif experienced at least three deliberate fires between the 4th century BC and the 1st century AD, following the abandonment or under-exploitation of the pastures.

In the high meadows, one can observe the presence of plant species originating from subalpine regions or subarctic zones. The vegetation in the area between 900 and 1,250 meters consists of acidophilic mountain grasslands, while beyond 1,250 meters, it forms subalpine acidophilic heaths. The flora of the area includes a variety of species, such as common heather(Calluna vulgaris), common bilberry (Vaccinium myrtillus), lingonberry (Vaccinium vitis-idaea subsp. vitis-idaea), mountain arnica (Arnica montana), great yellow gentian (or great yellow gentian, Gentiana lutea), which only blooms after ten years of growth and can reach 1.20 meters in height, and Alpine pasqueflower (Pulsatilla alpina), which covers primary meadows with white flowers between April and June, (Note: Pulsatilla alba is a synonym for Anemone scherfelii: Anemone scherfelii on Tela Botanica archive. Since 2012, Anemone scherfelii has been considered a distinct species from the Alpine pasqueflower (Anemone alpina): "Anemone alpina". Tela Botanica. Archived from the original on June 1, 2019.) and the martagon lily (Lilium martagon), which blooms in June and July and can reach 1.50 meters in height, are also present. Additionally, there are the clubmosses (Lycopodium clavatum), Alpine clubmoss (Lycopodium alpinum), fir clubmoss (Huperzia selago), and crowberry (Empetrum nigrum). The flora also includes the bog bilberry (Vaccinium uliginosum), Pyrenean lion's-tooth (Leontodon pyrenaicus), Vosges hawkweed (Hieracium vogesiacum), Alpine hawkweed (Hieracium alpinum), olive-green hawkweed (Hieracium olivaceum), and Pyrenean sanicle (Epikeros pyrenaeus syn. Selinum pyrenaeum).

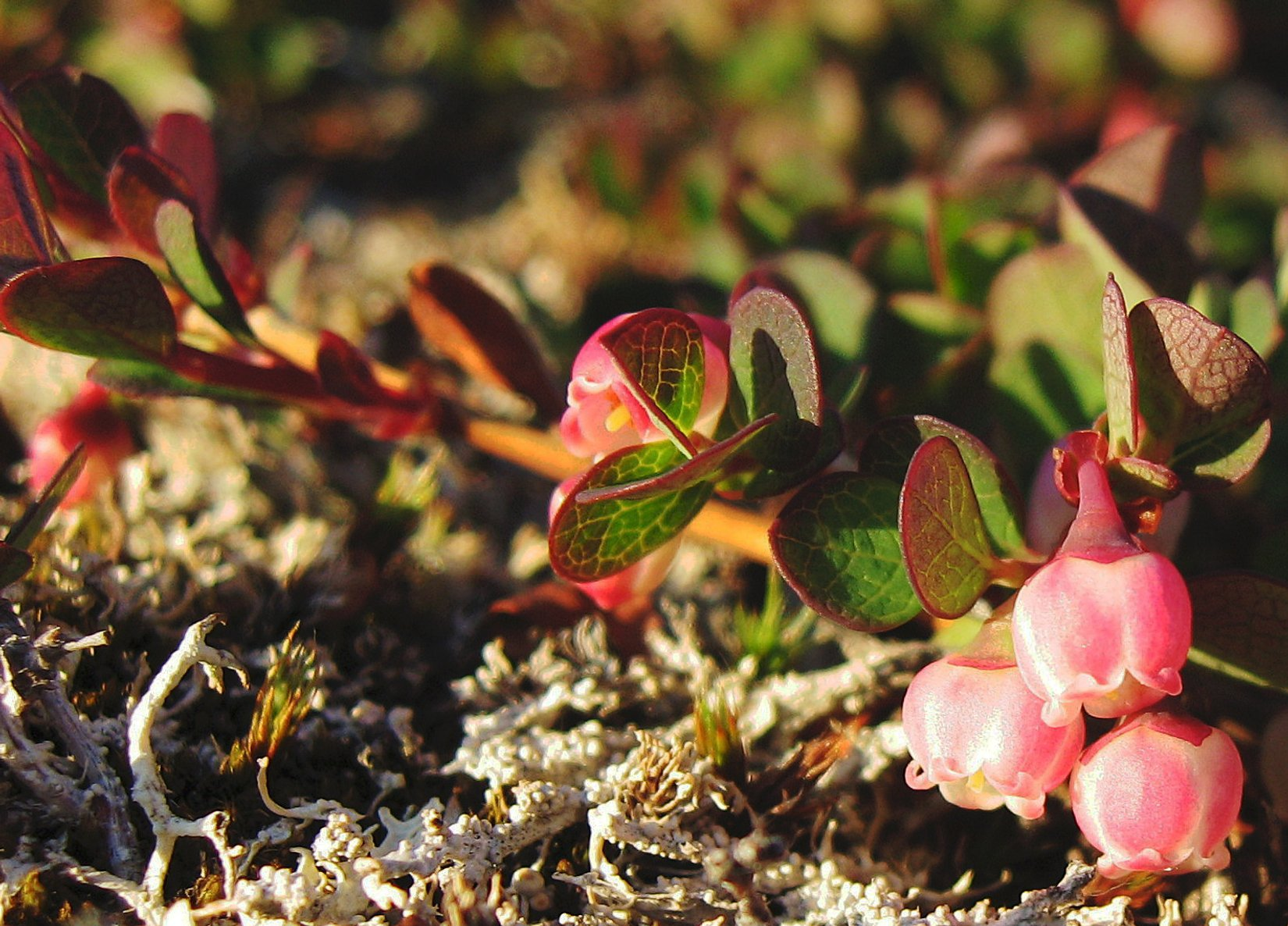
Bog bilberry.

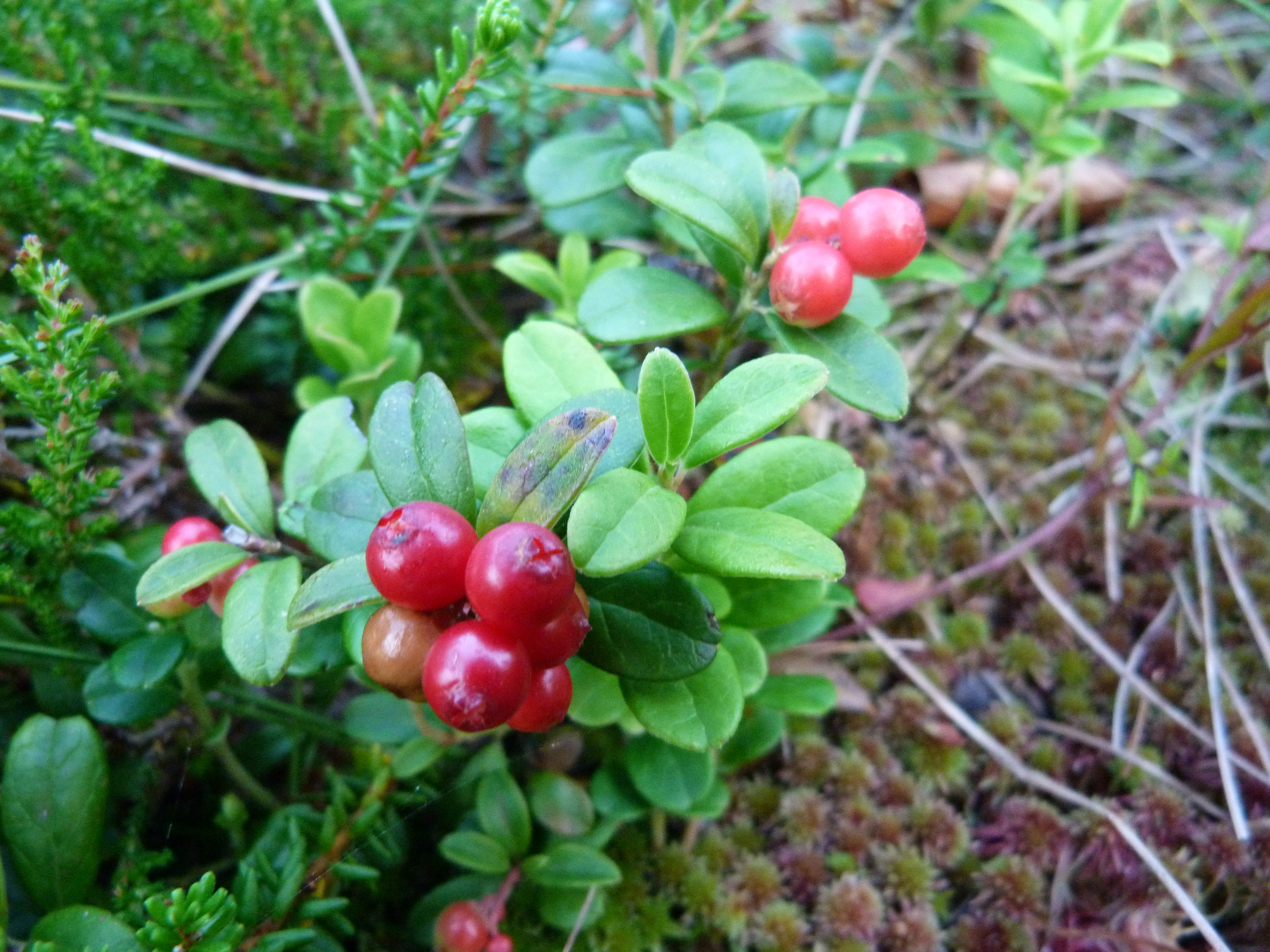
Lingonberry at Tanet.

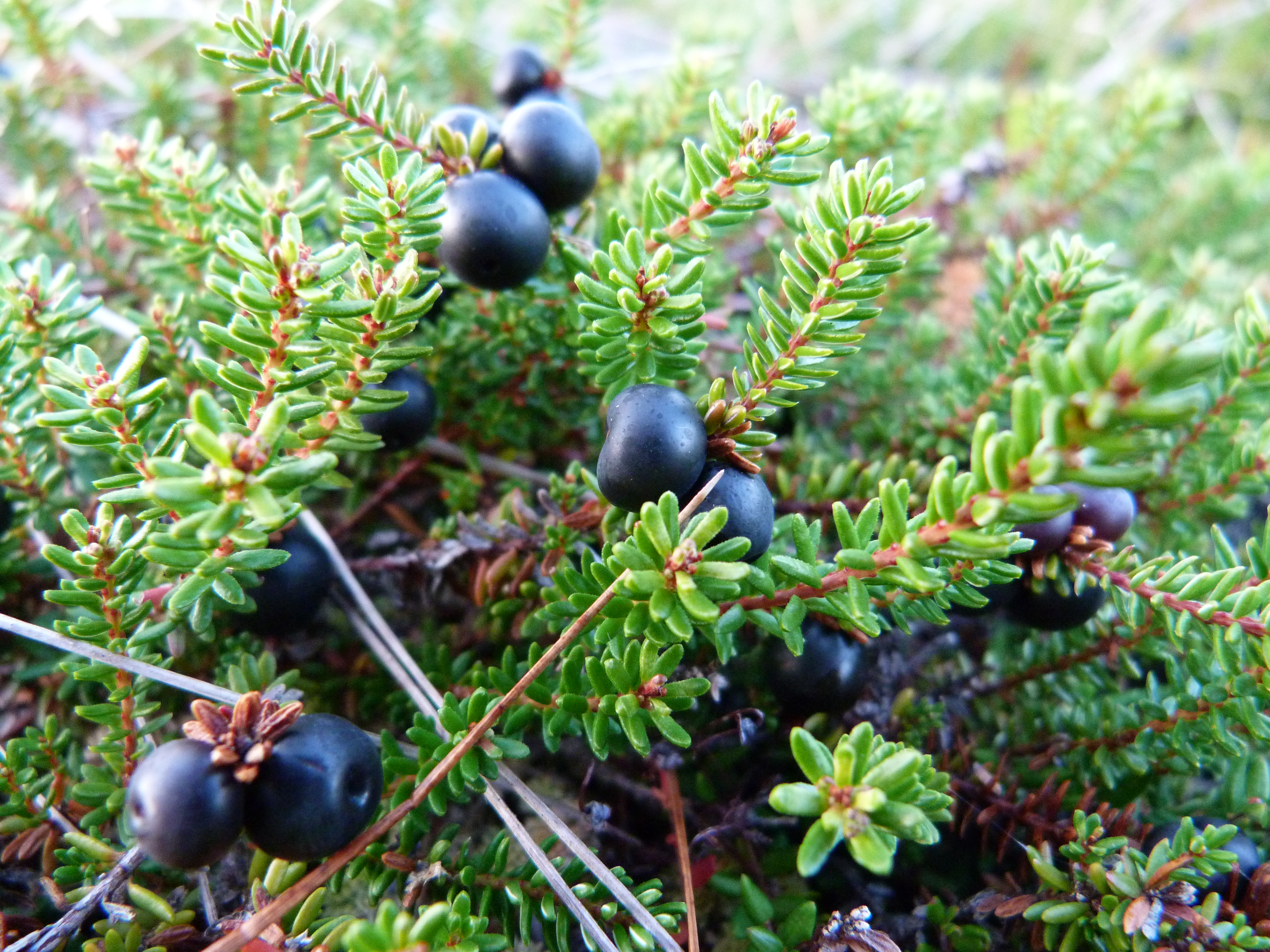
Crowberry, Tanet.

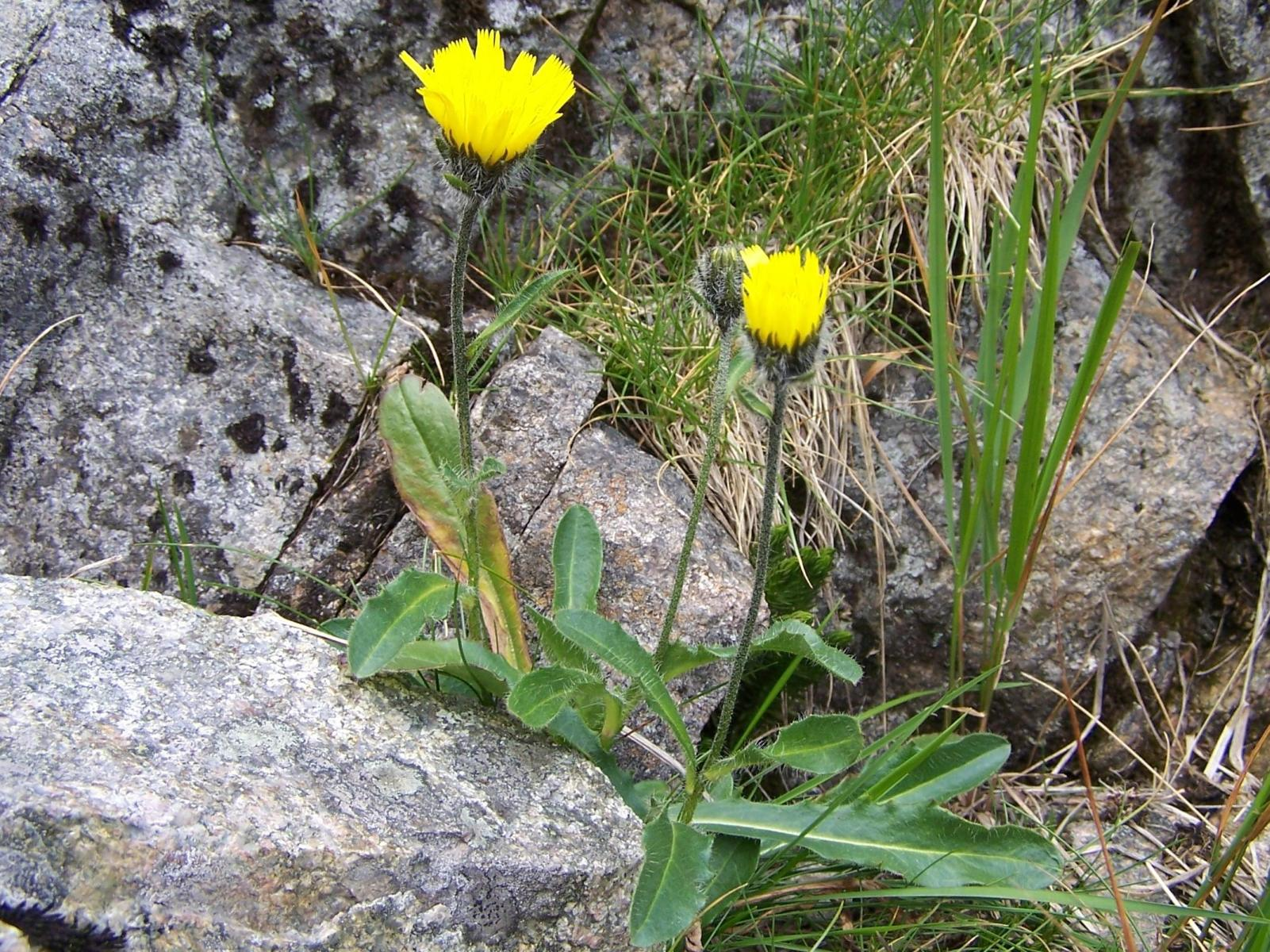
Alpine hawkweed.

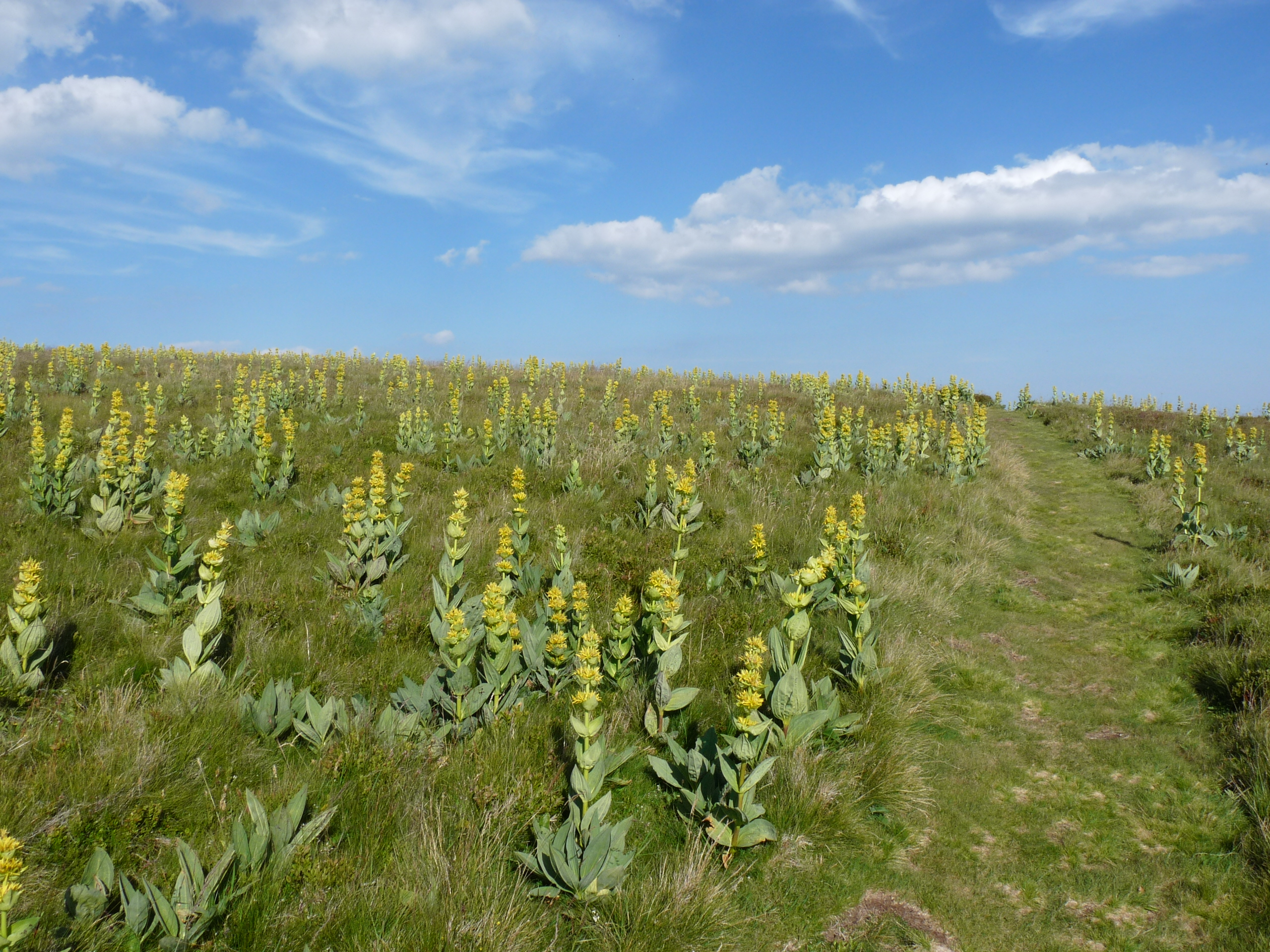
Great yellow gentian at Kastelberg.

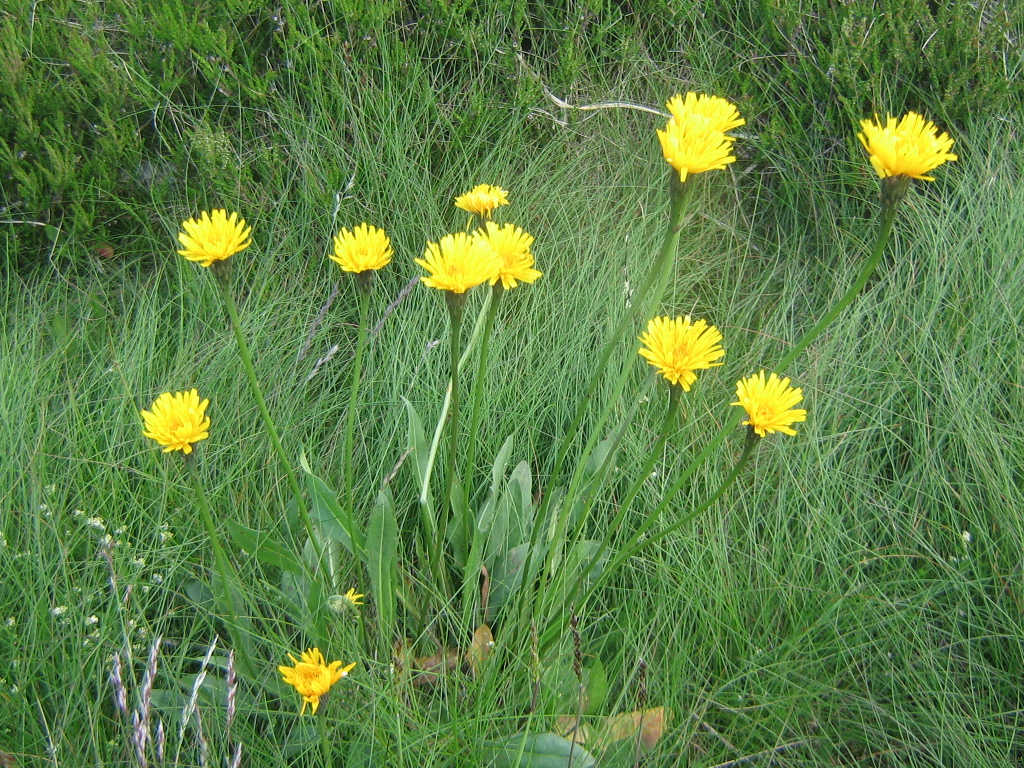
Pyrenean lion's-tooth.

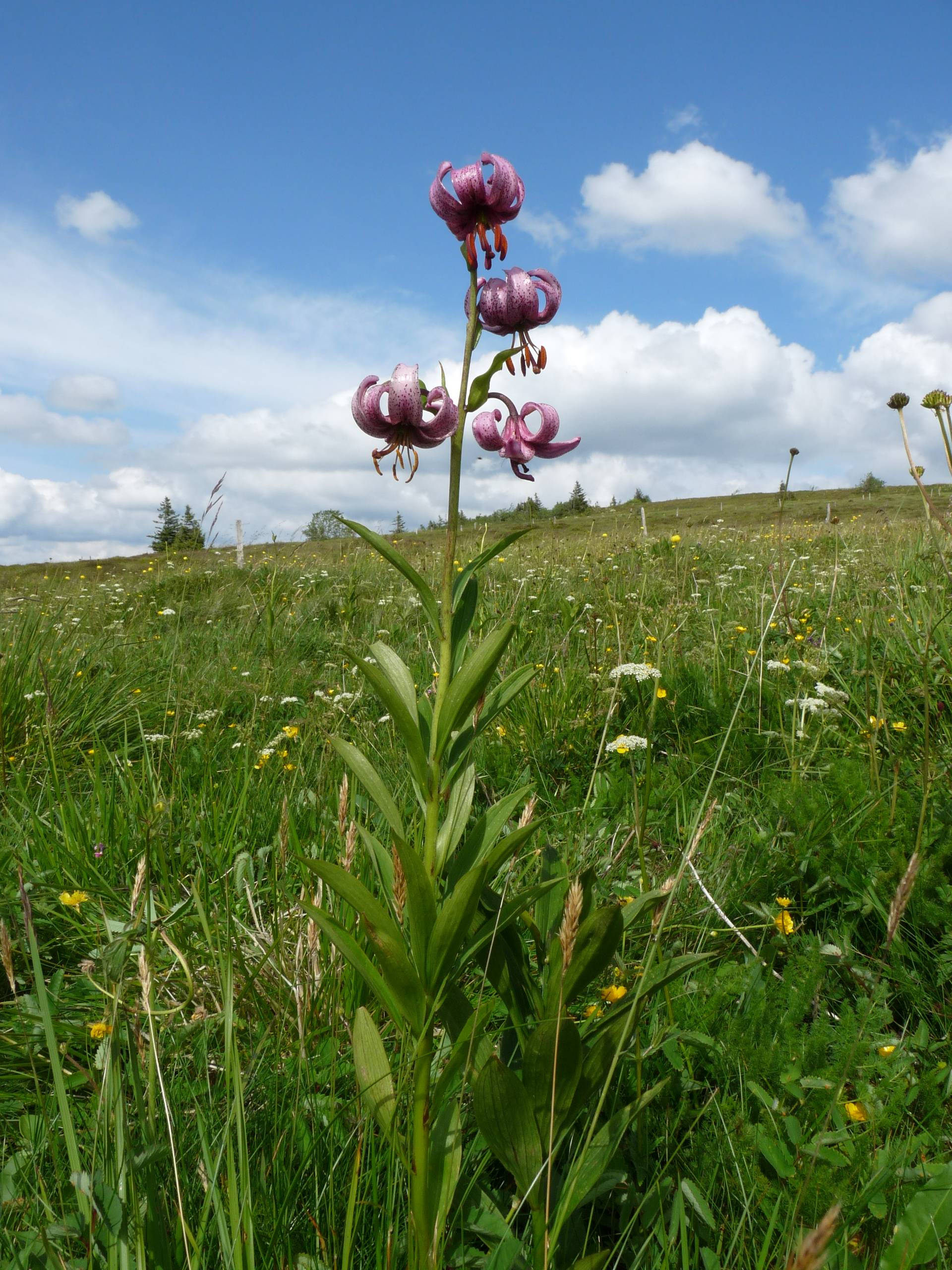
Martagon lily on the Faing lawn.

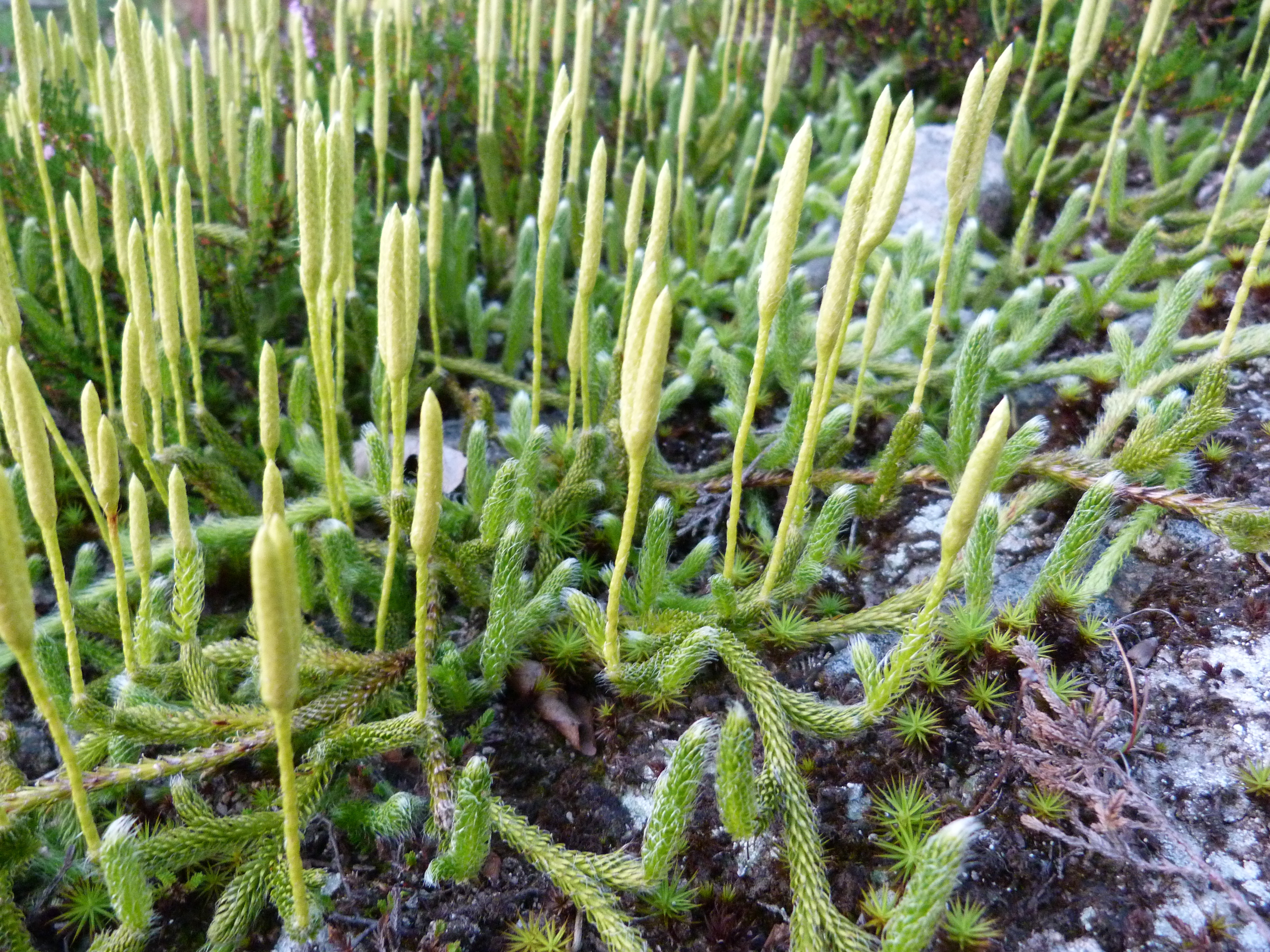
Clubmoss at Tanet.

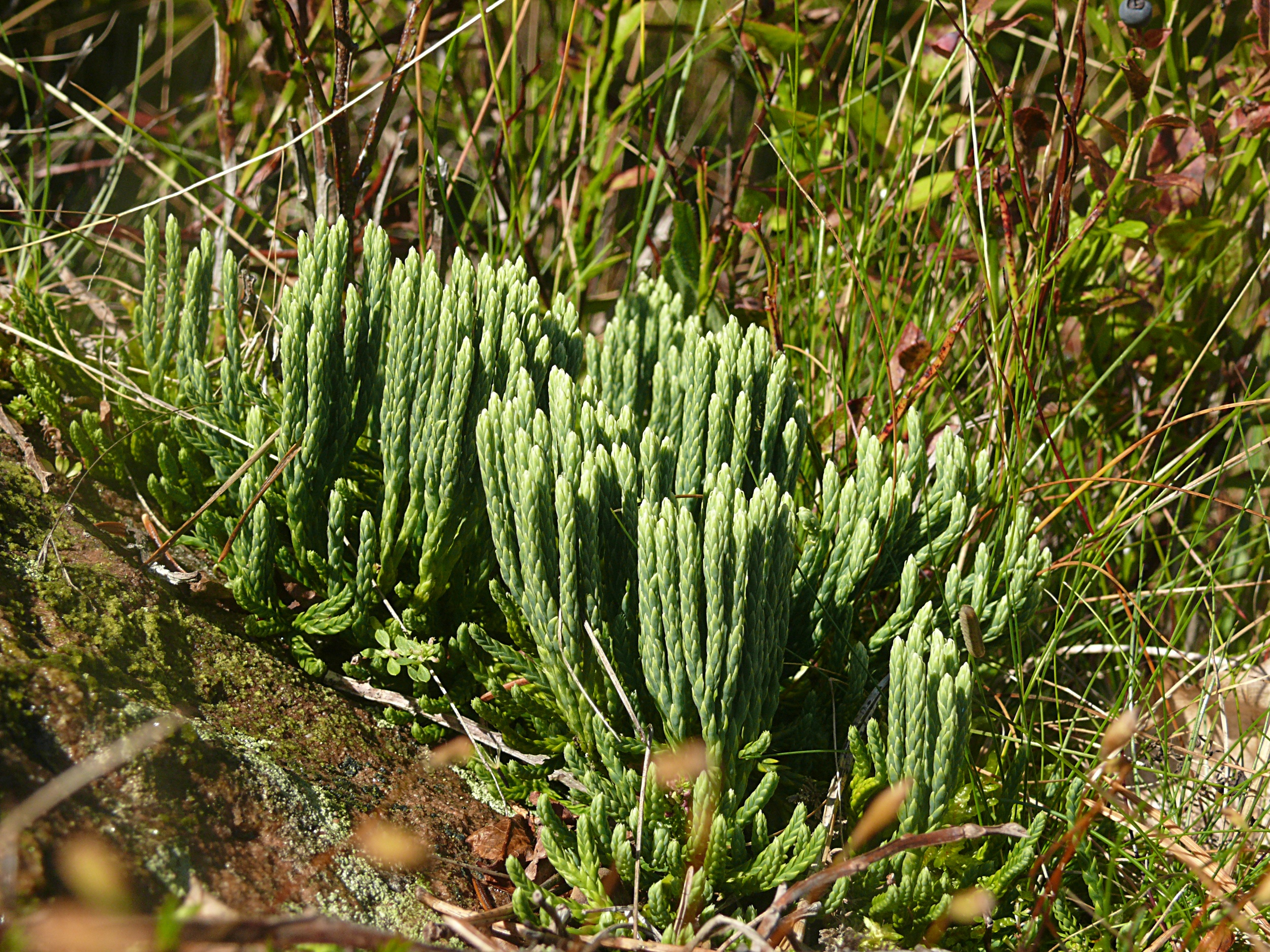
Alpine clubmoss.

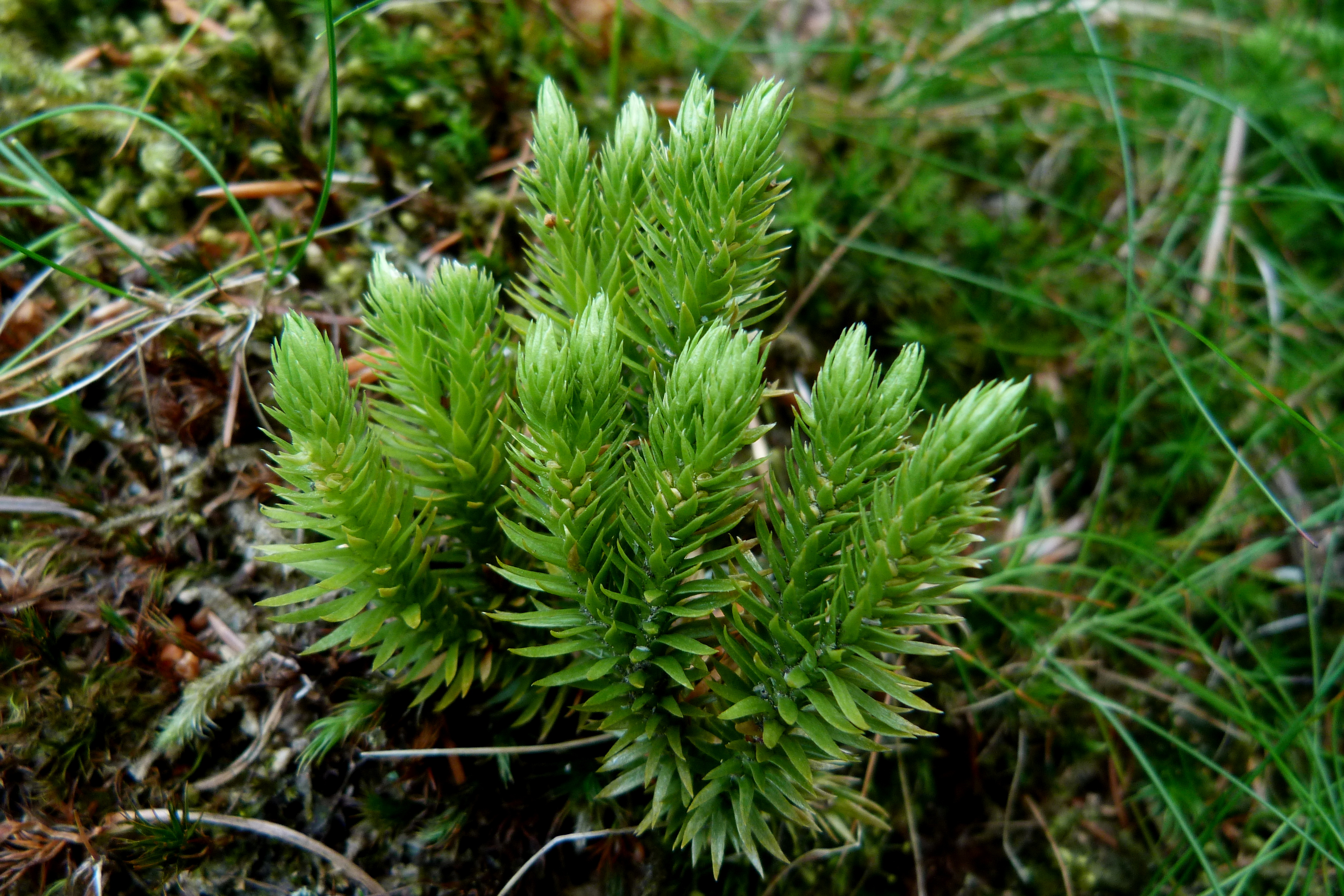
Bog bilberry in the Hohneck massif.

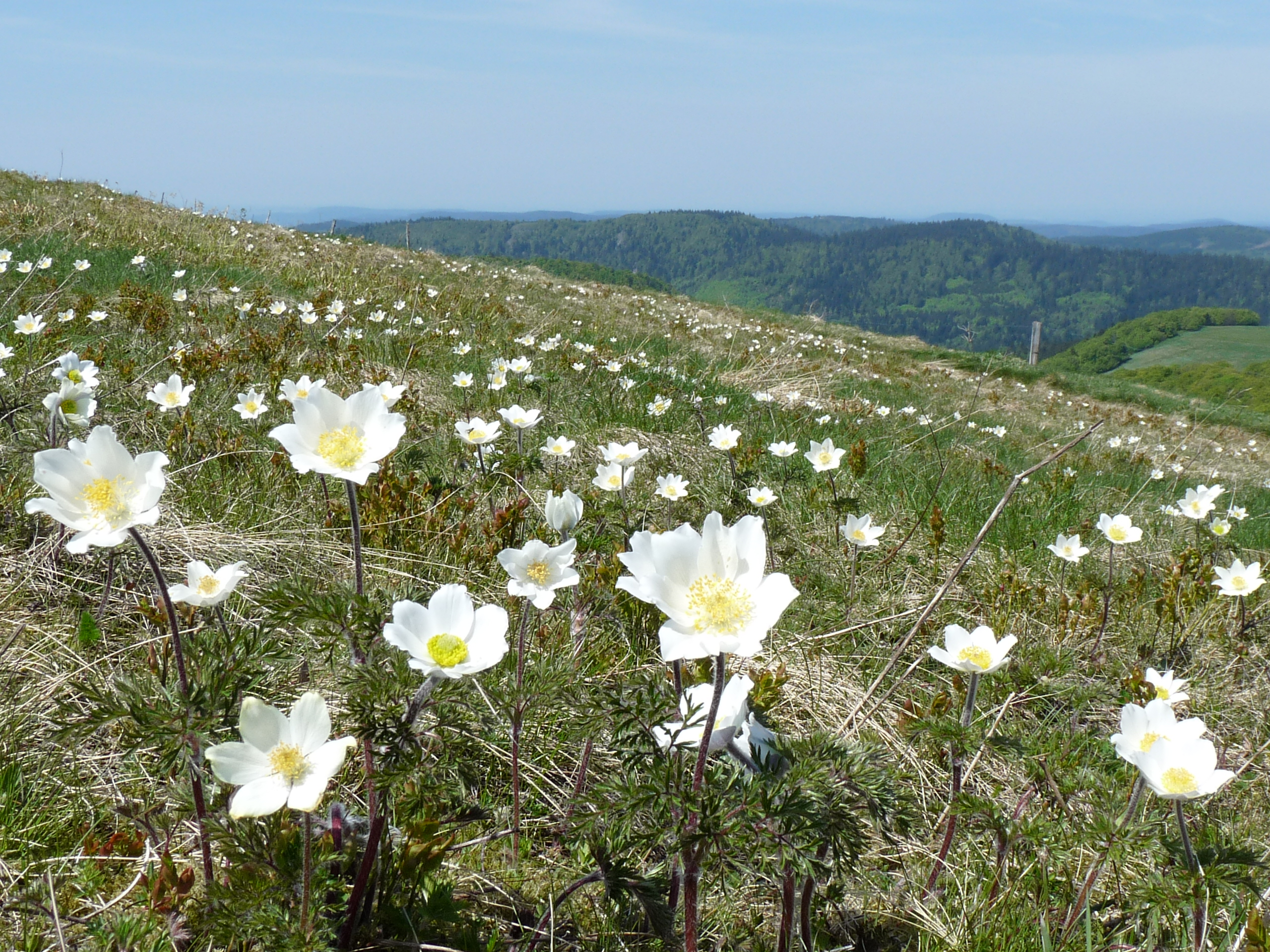
Alpine pasqueflower at Kastelberg.

Two species of orchid, relics of the glacial period, are also found in the region: the sweet-scented orchid (Pseudorchis albida), which emits a pleasant fragrance, and the frog orchid (Coeloglossum viride), which is named for the peculiar shape of its flowers and is a protected species. Other visible relict flowers include the Norwegian cudweed (Gnaphalium norvegicum), which features silvery foliage, and the Jasione perennis (Jasione laevis), a rare species that is endemic to altitudes above 1,300 meters.

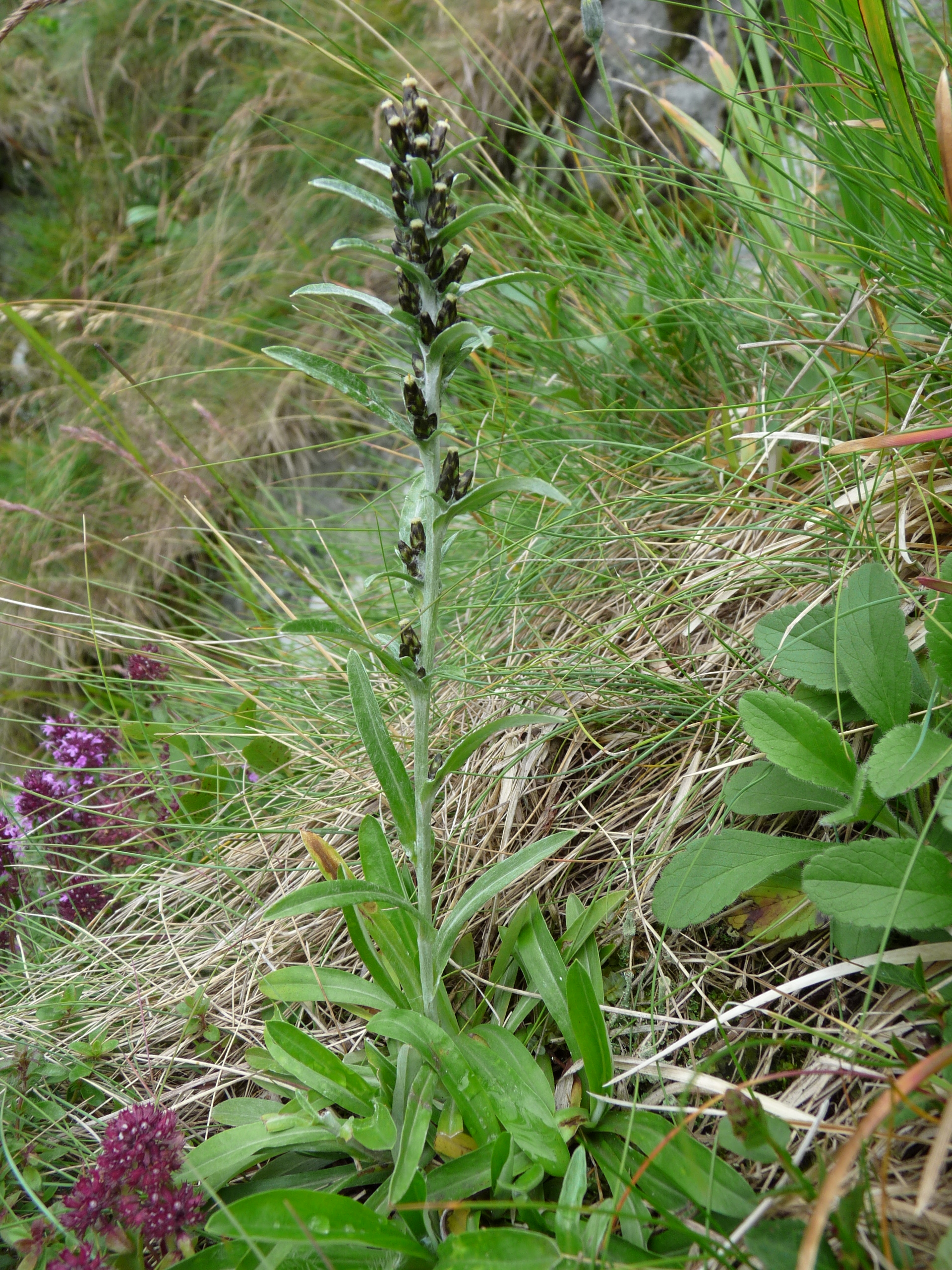
Norwegian arctic cudweed near the Spitzkoepfe.

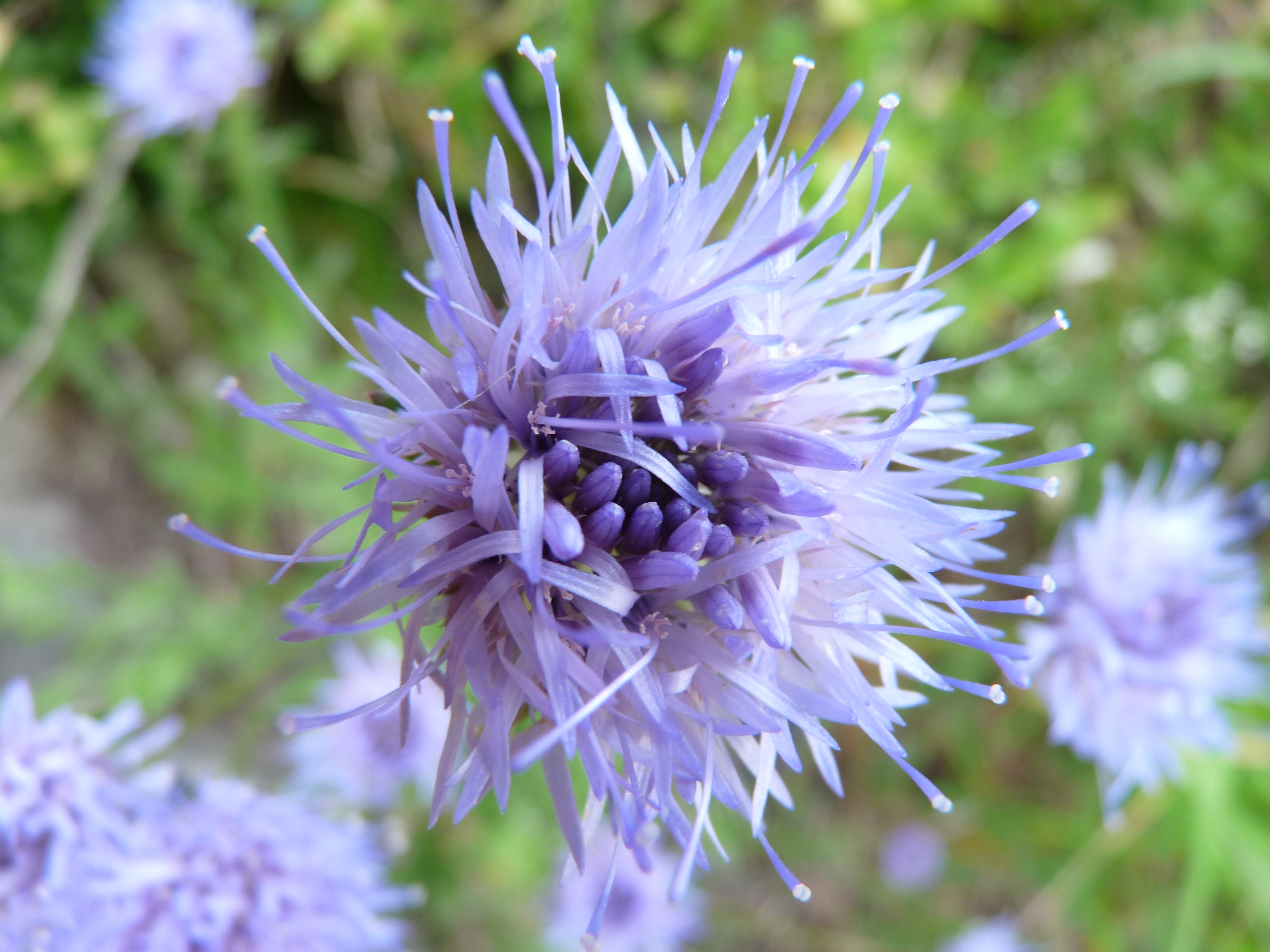
Jasione perennis at the Wormspel pass.

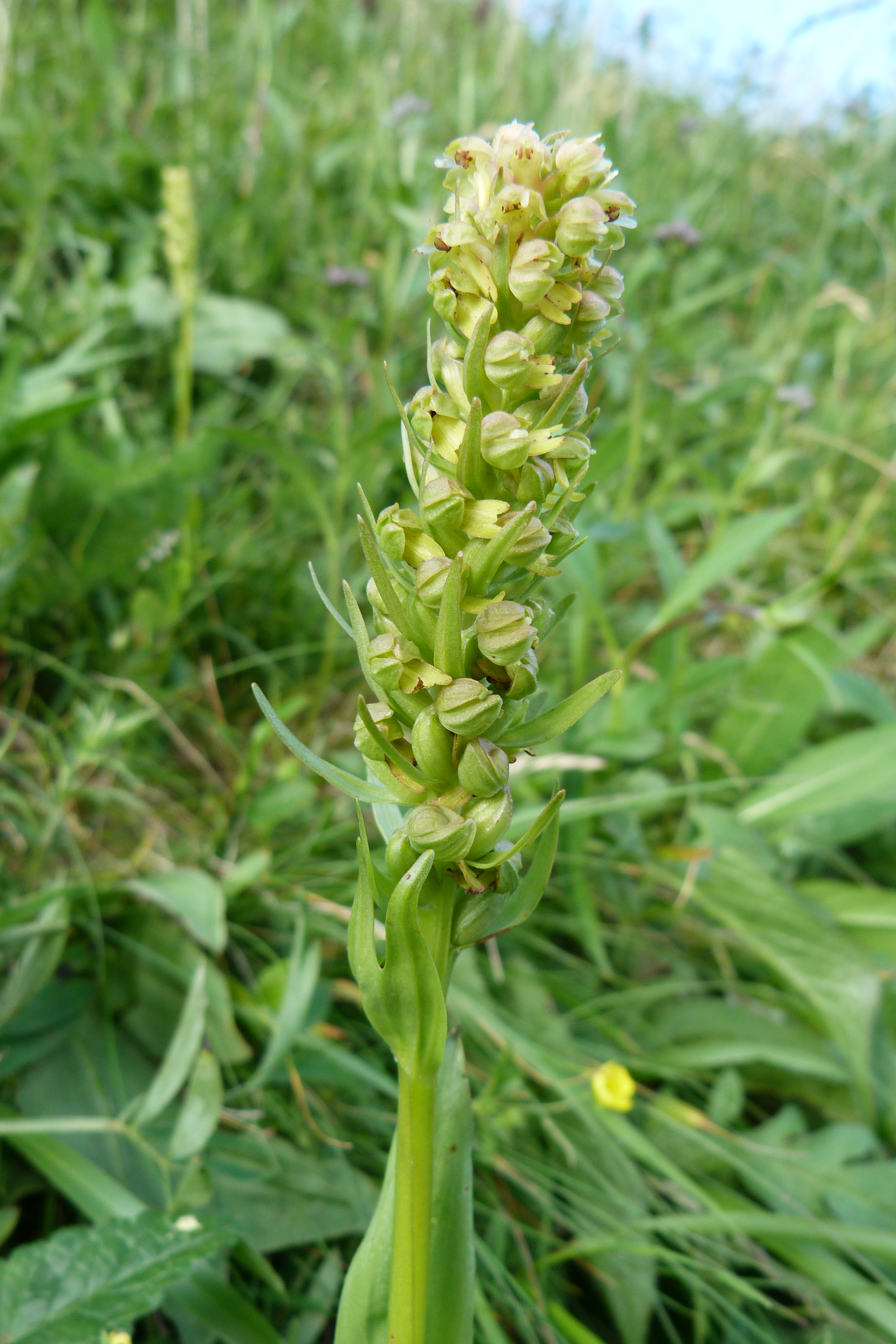
Frog orchid towards the Spitzkoepfe.

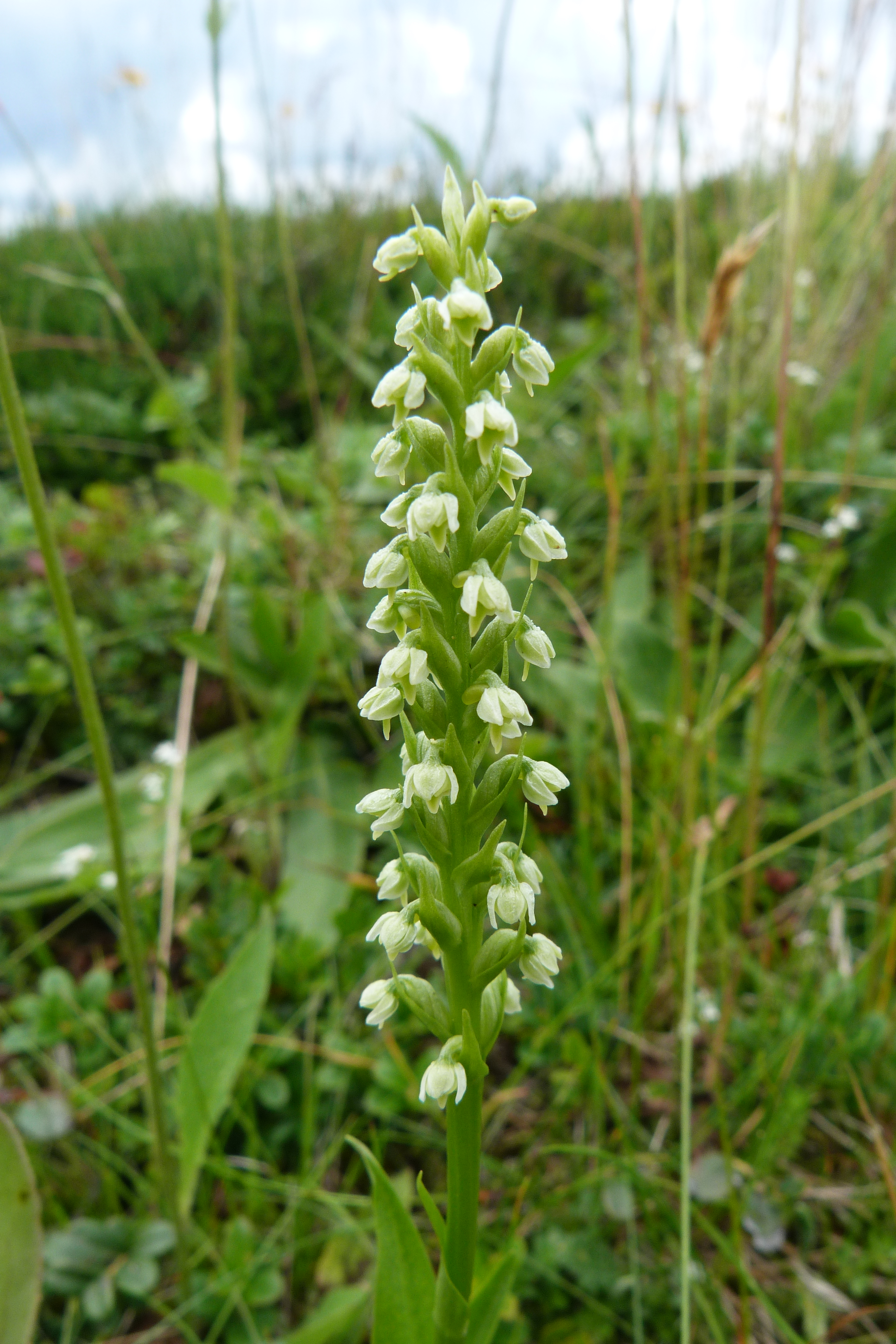
Sweet-scented orchid at Markstein.

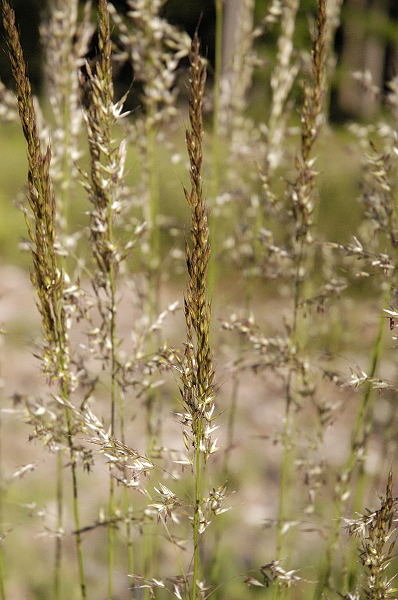
Calamagrostis arundinacea.

As a consequence of increased sunlight, the meadow becomes enriched with grasses, thereby transforming it into a prairie, specifically a calamagrostis grassland. This is named after the dominant grass, Calamagrostis arundinacea, which exhibits pink and purple reflections. Other species present include matgrass (Nardus stricta), wavy hairgrass (Deschampsia flexuosa), red fescue (Festuca rubra), and common bent (Agrostis capillaris). Additionally, other plant types are present, including alpine fennel (Meum athamanticum), mountain cornflower (Centaurea montana), globe orchid (Traunsteinera globosa), and winged broom (Genista sagittalis). By late June, in areas with optimal exposure to sunlight, one can observe the presence of St. Bernard's lily (Anthericum liliago), which exhibits delicate white flowers. The orange hawkweed (Hieracium aurantiacum) flowers from July to August, reaching a height of 20 to 40 centimeters. The big-flowered foxglove (Digitalis grandiflora), which bears pale yellow flowers, is a particularly uncommon species in the Vosges region. During the summer, the fringed pink (Dianthus superbus) can be observed with its finely divided flowers. The most emblematic flower of the high meadows is arguably the Vosges violet (Viola lutea ssp. elegans). While it is present in other French mountains, its diverse colors—including yellow, violet, white, bicolored, and tricolored—makes it particularly distinctive. From May to August, it is found almost everywhere in primary and especially secondary grasslands.

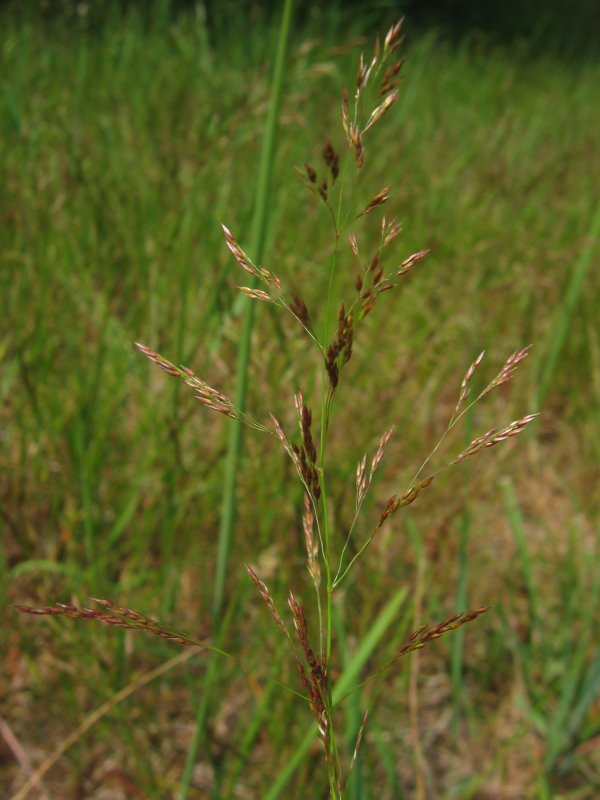
Common bent.

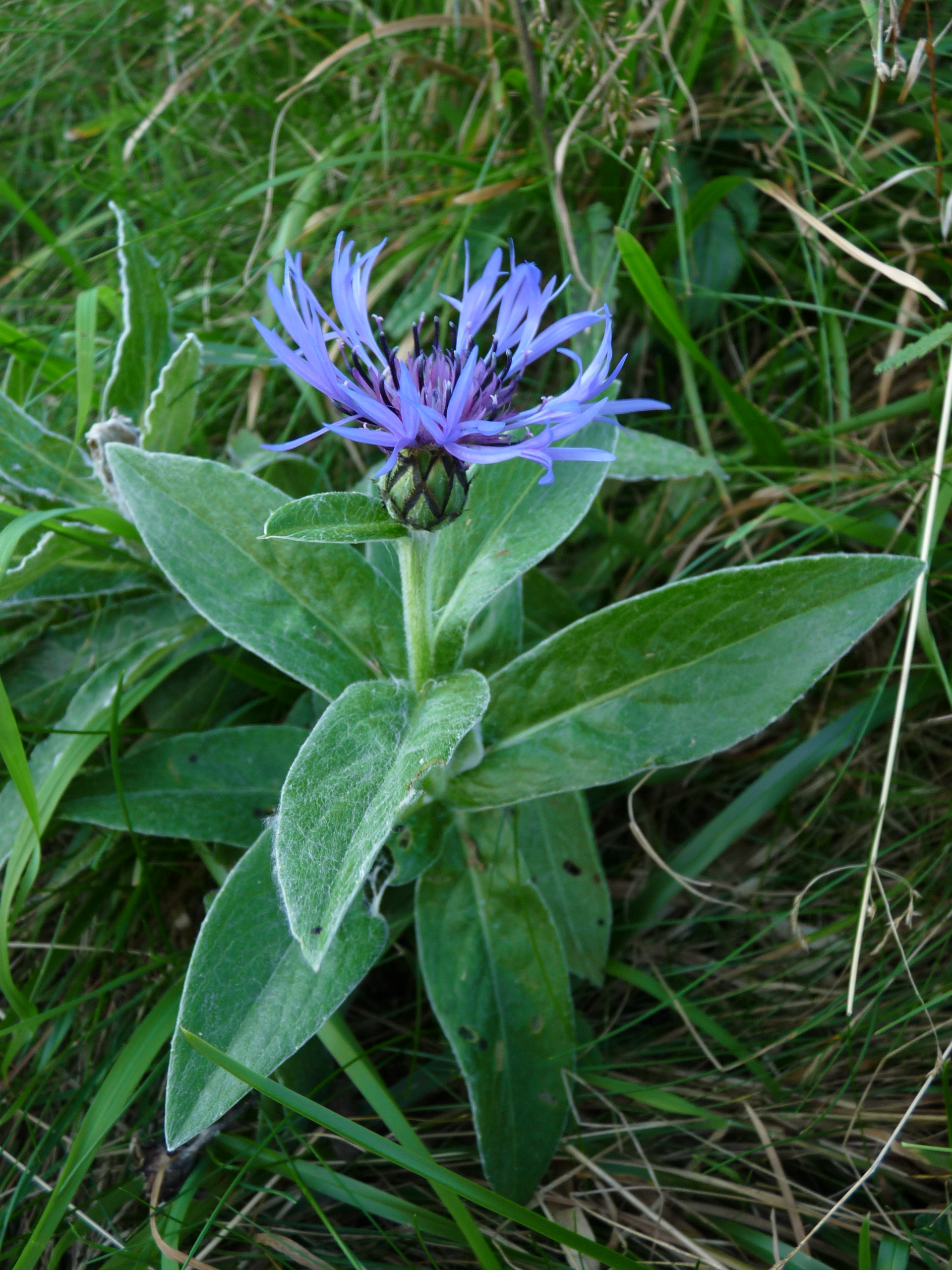
Mountain cornflower towards the Spitzkoepfe.

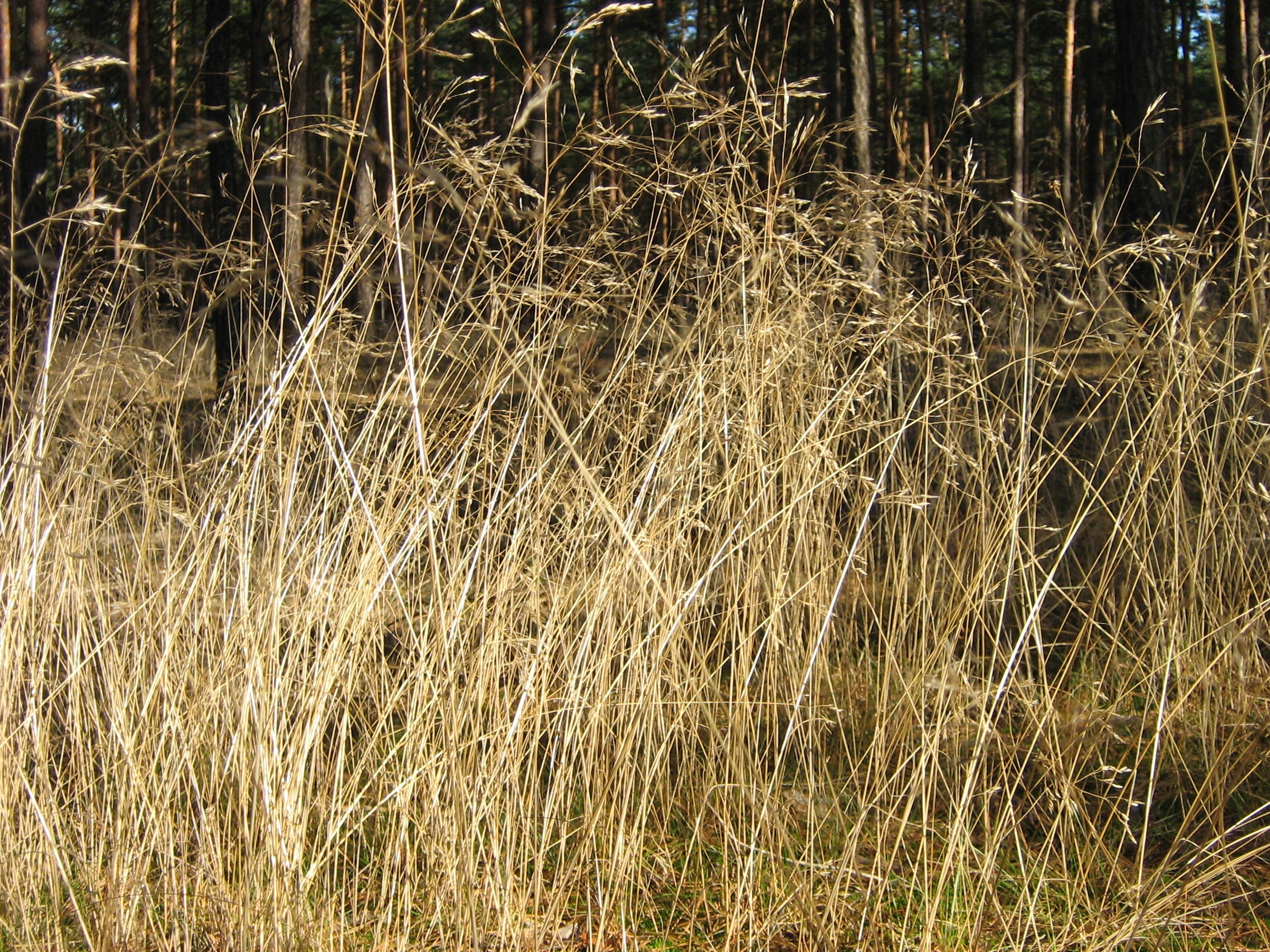
Wavy hairgrass.

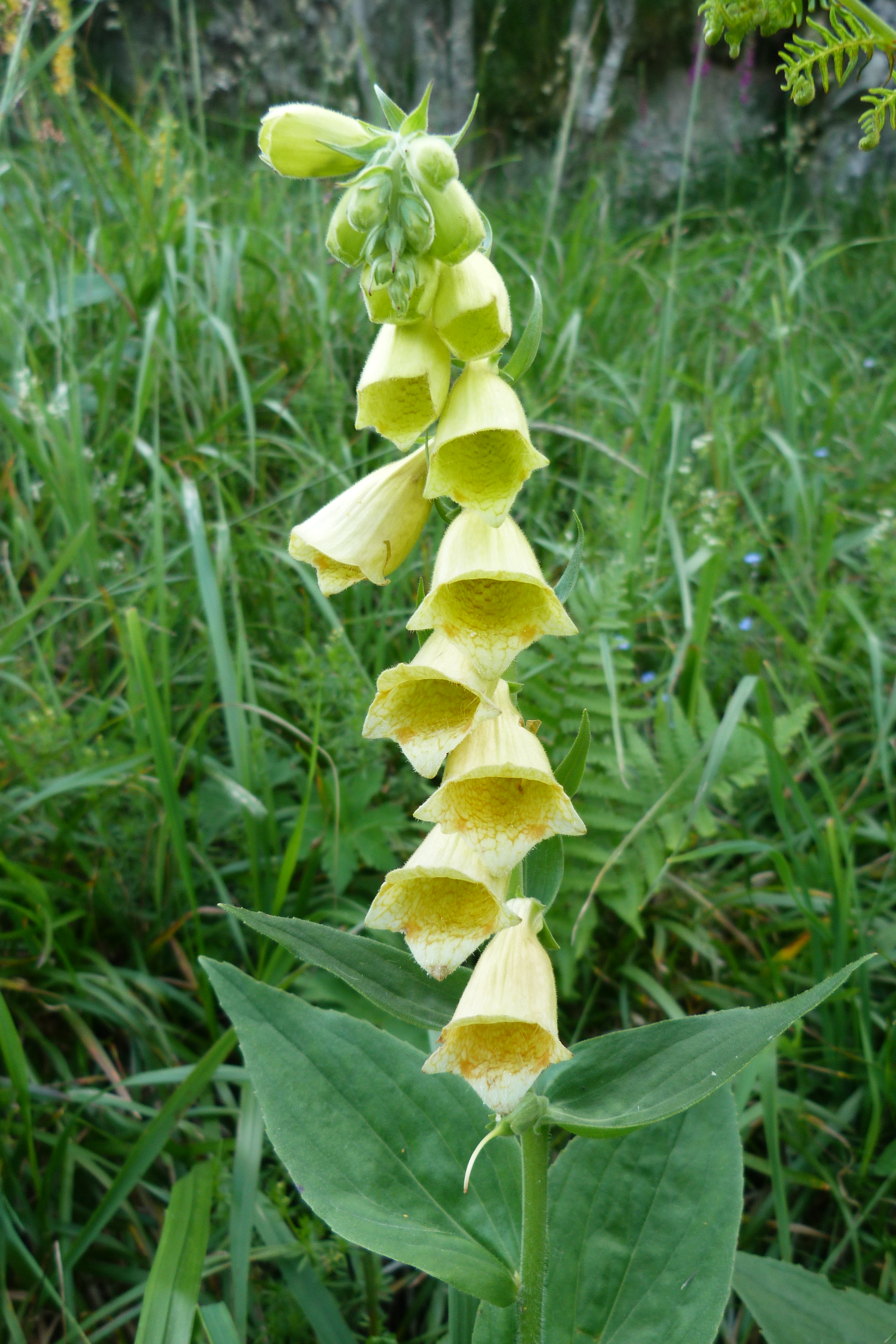
Big-flowered foxglove towards the Spitzkoepfe.

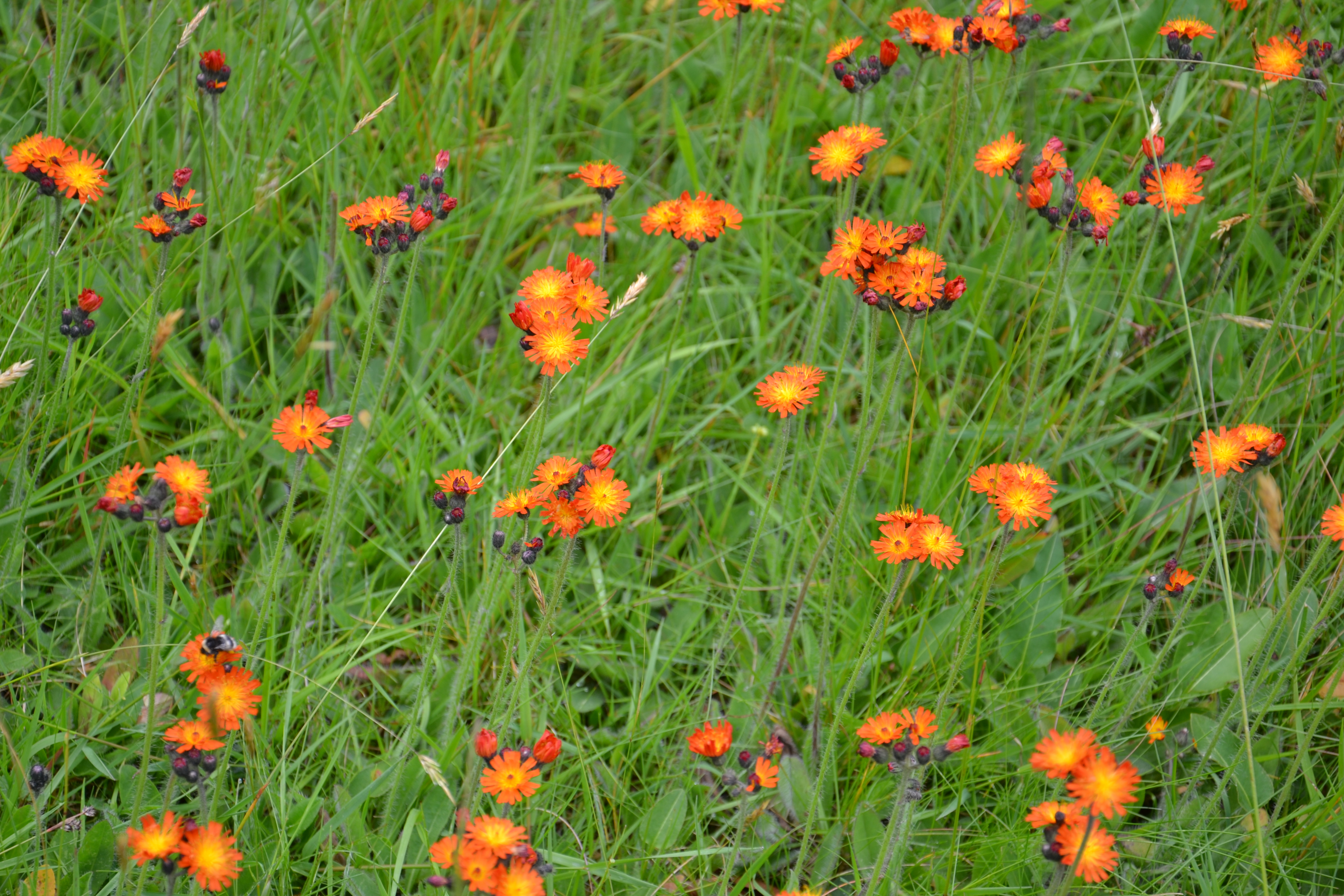
Orange hawkweed, Xonrupt.

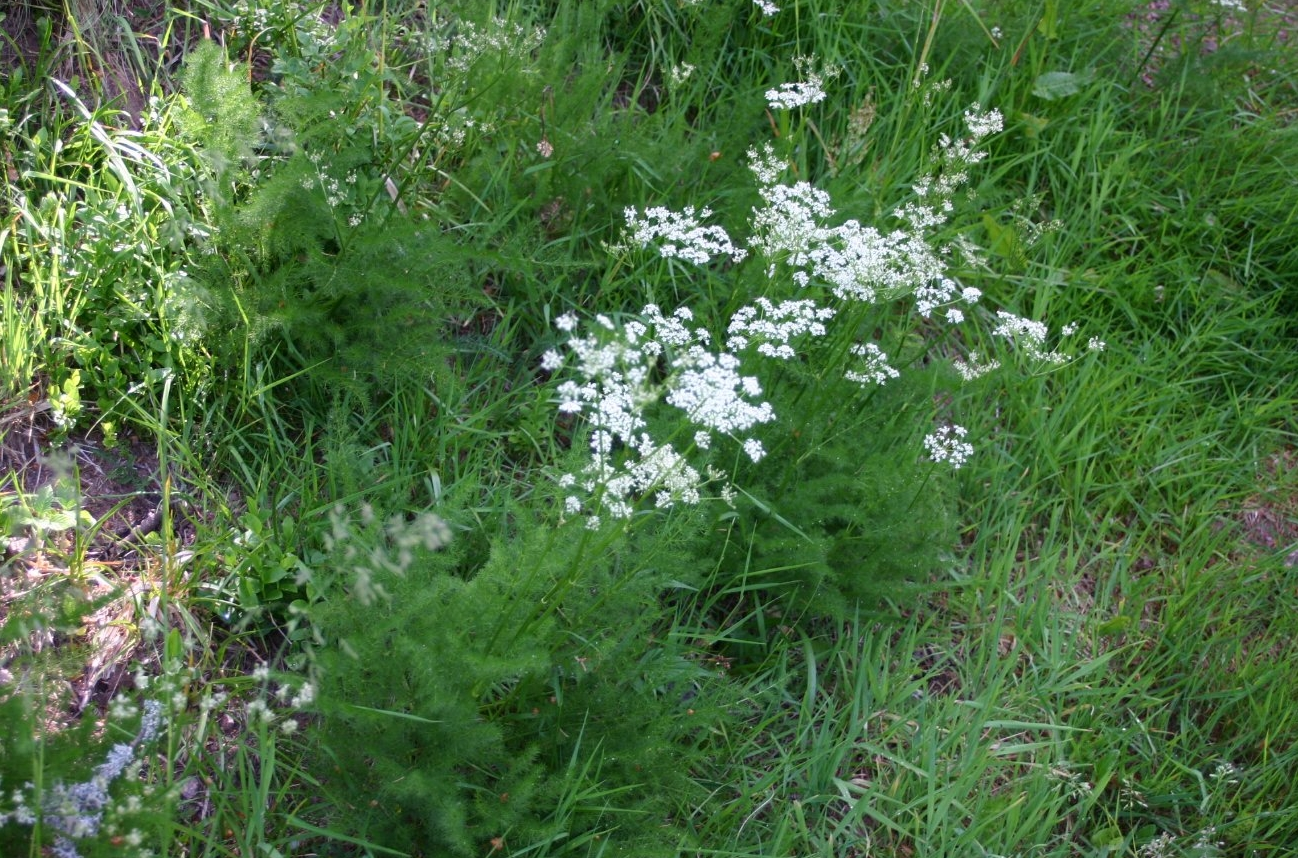
Alpine fennel, Col de la Schlucht.

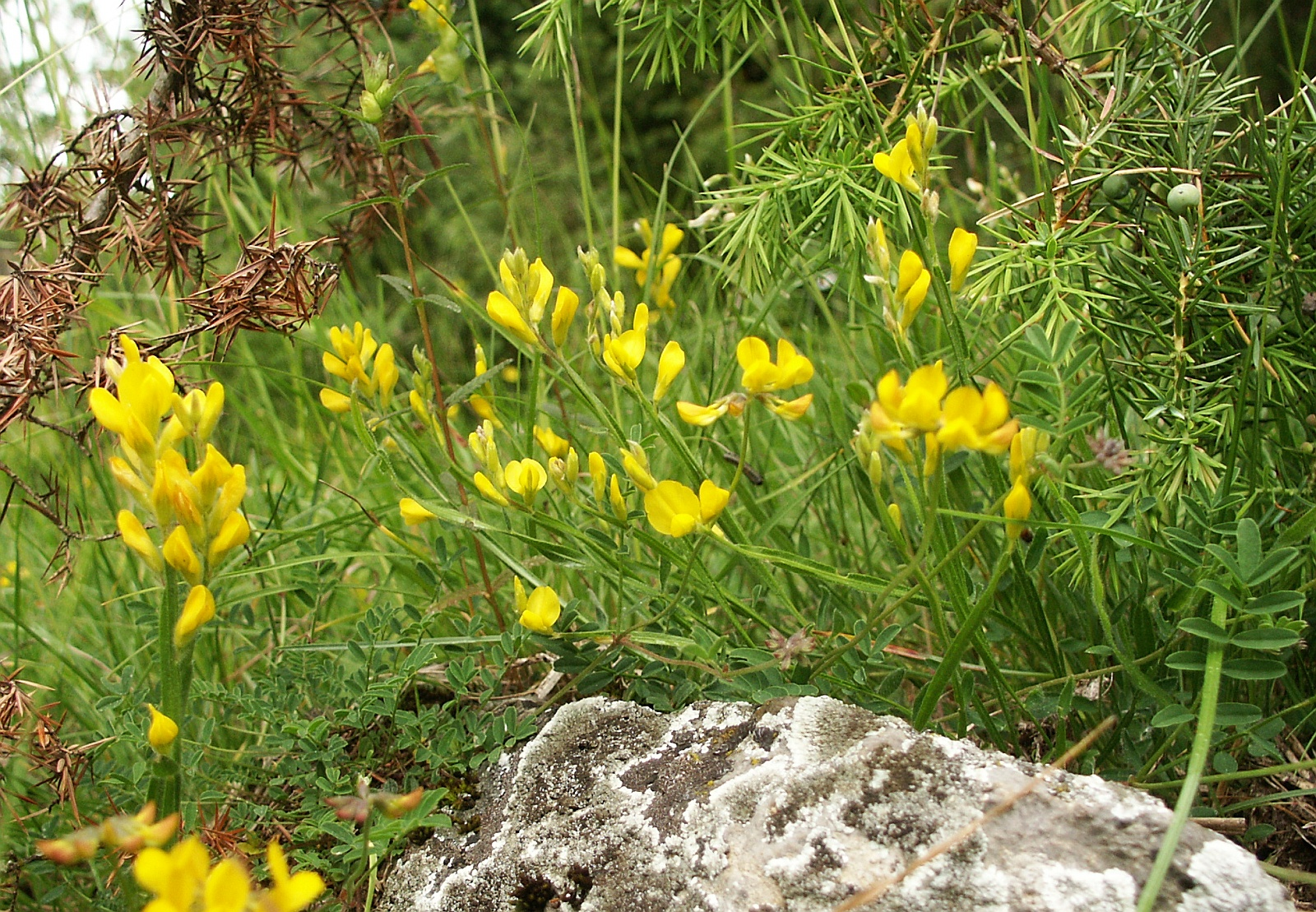
Winged broom.

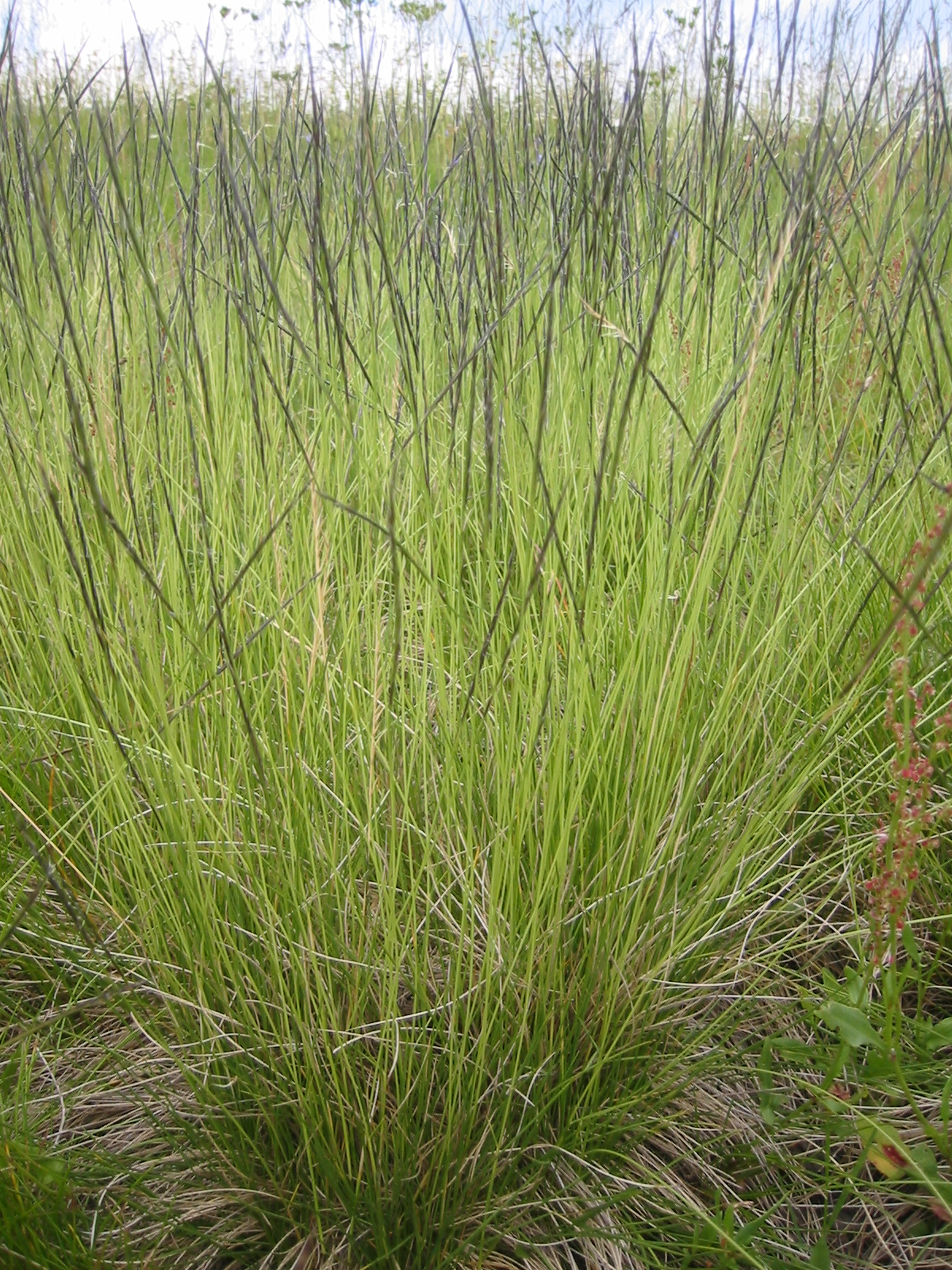
Matgrass .

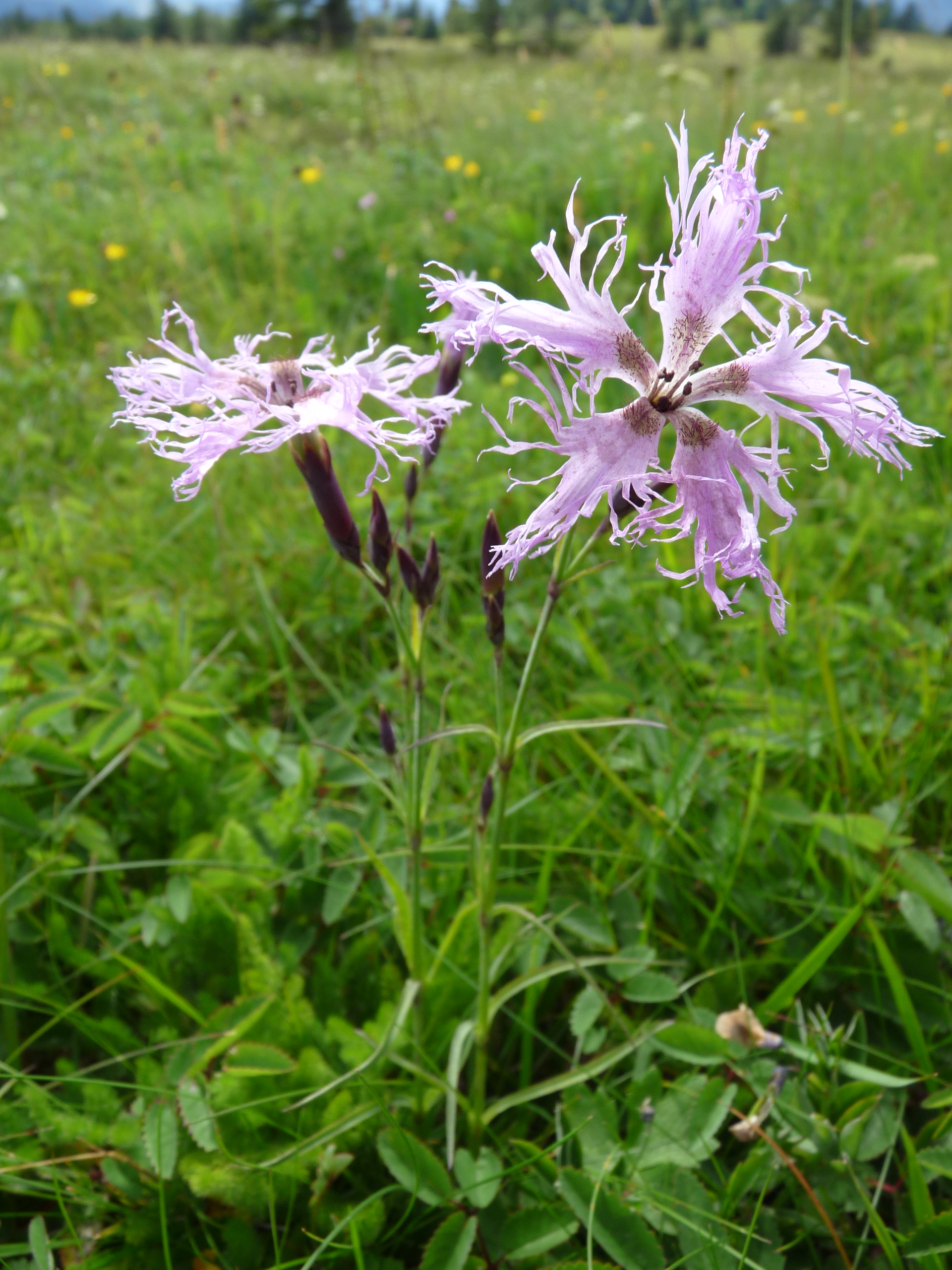
Fringed pink on the Faing lawn.

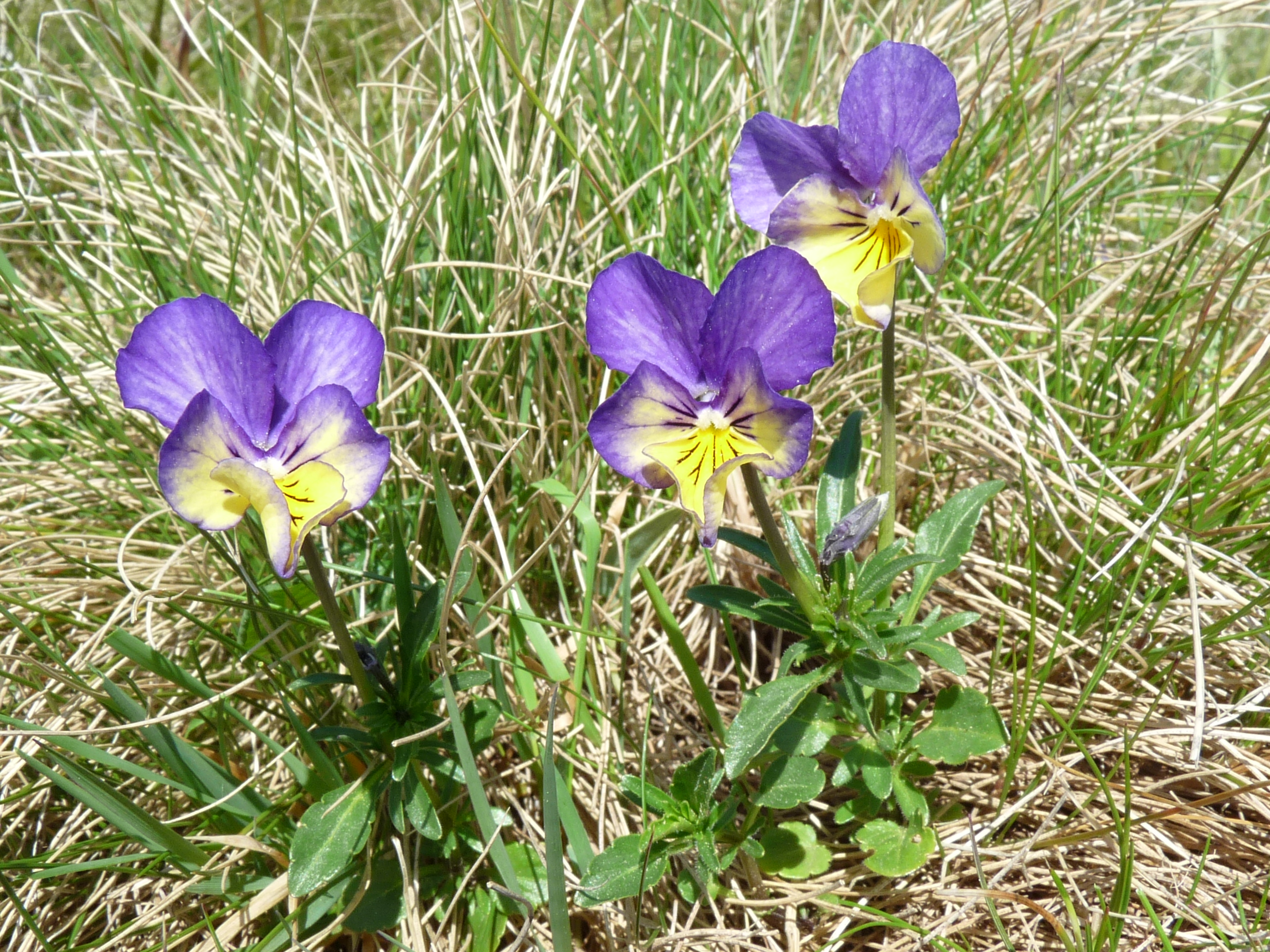
Bicolored Vosges violet at Kastelberg.

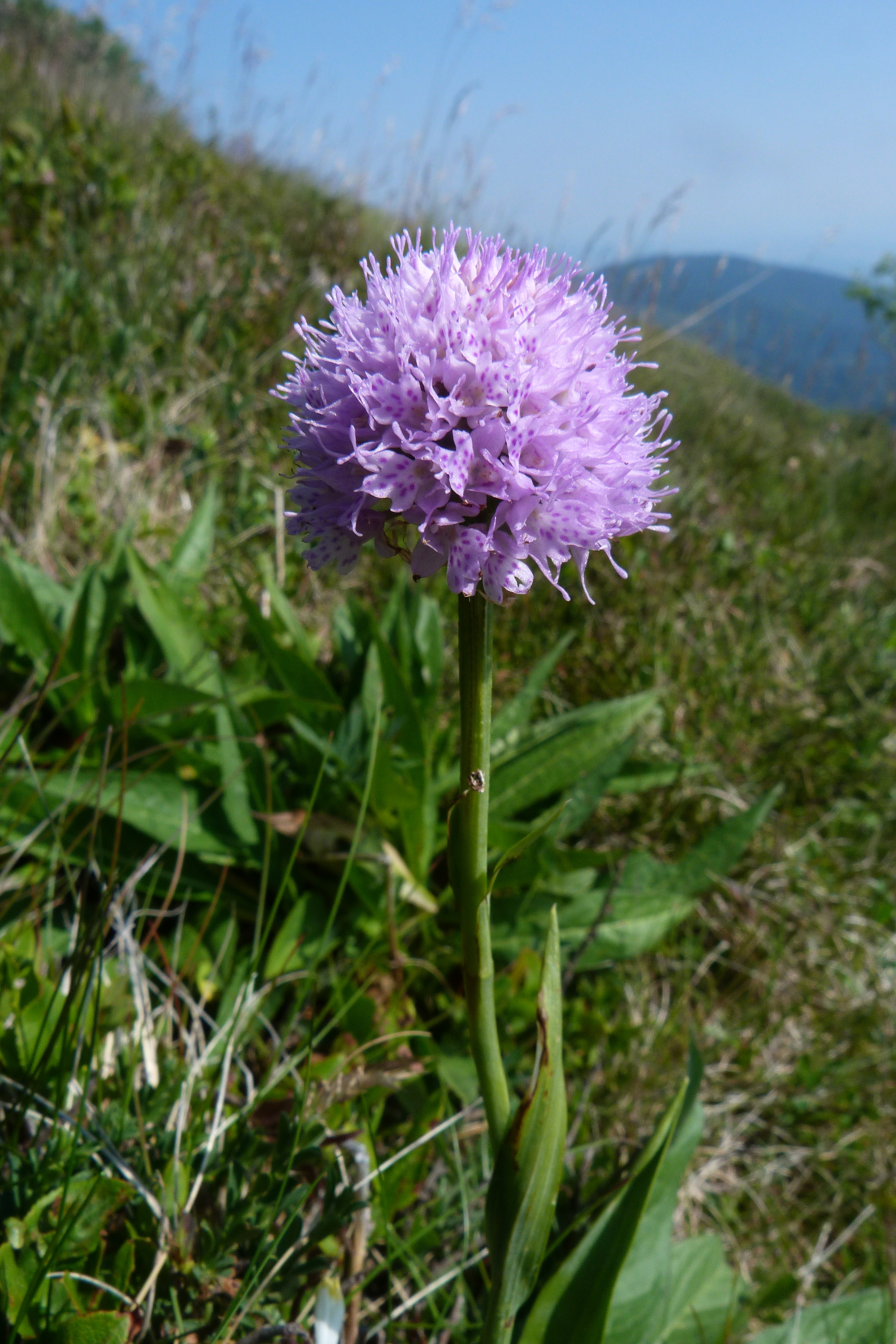
Globe orchid at Grand Ballon.

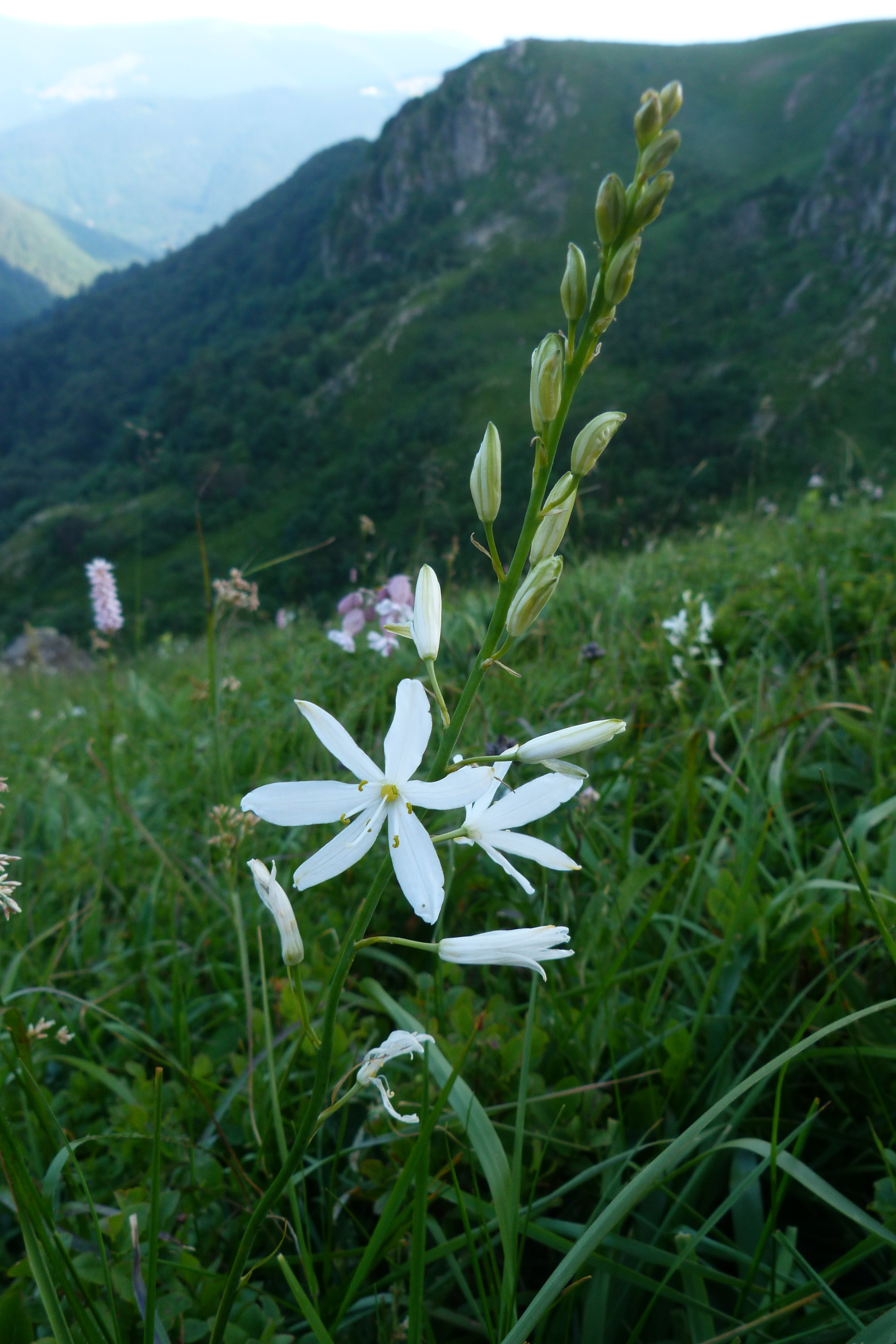
St. Bernard's lily in the Wormspel cirque.

== Rare and protected plants ==
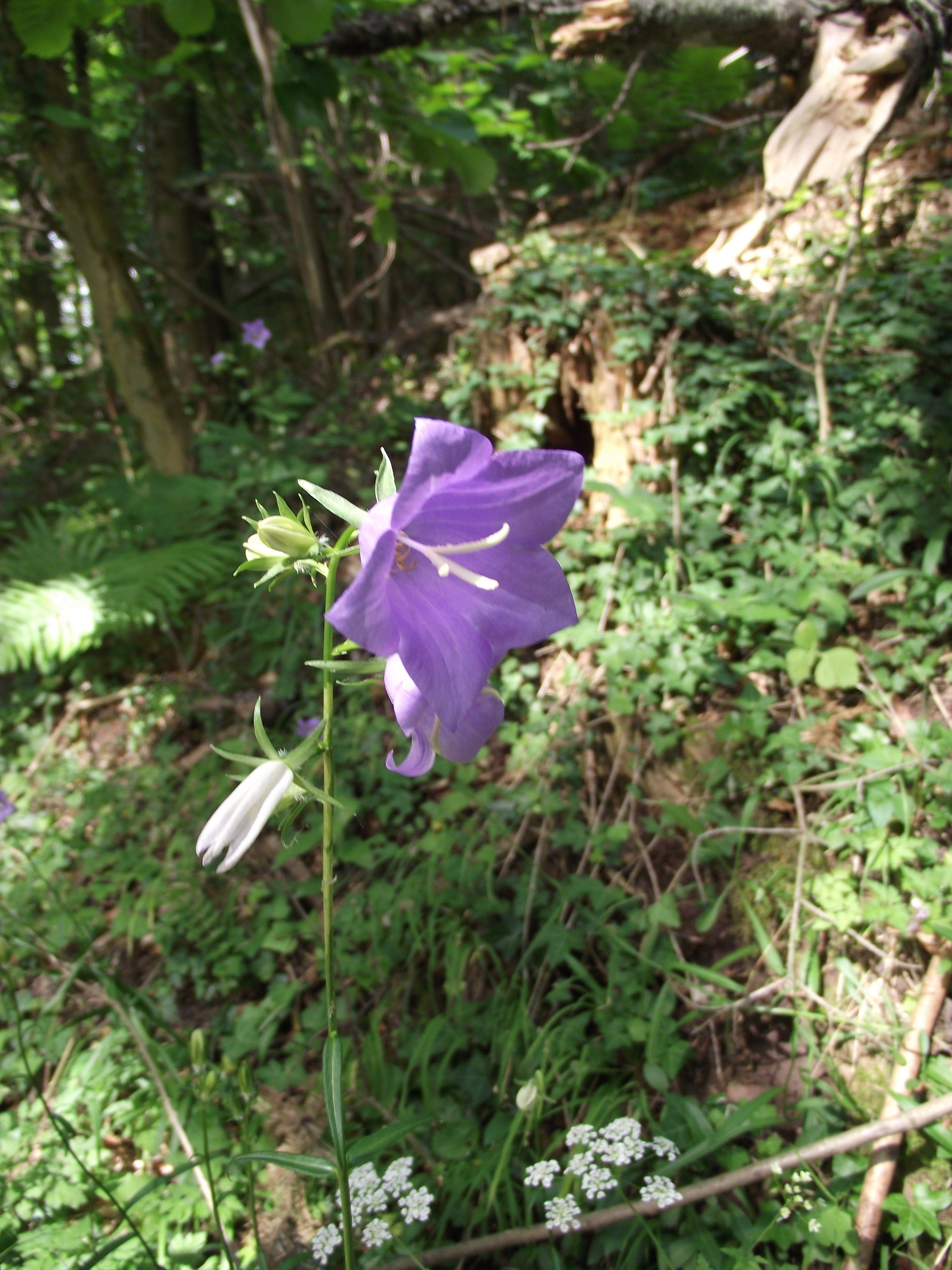
Baumgarten's bellflower in the Vosges du Nord.

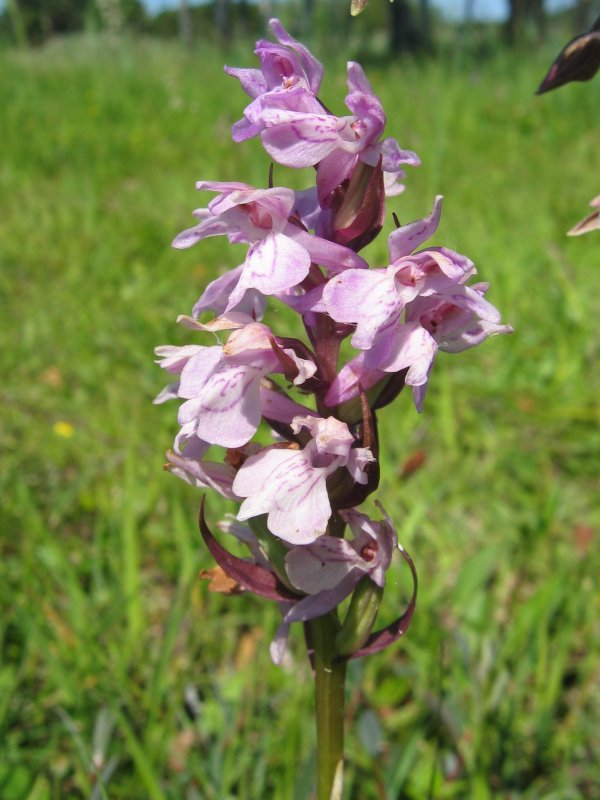
Traunstein's orchid.

The Vosges massif, situated in a geographic location that allows for the formation of a cold island, has served as a refuge for numerous arctic-alpine and circumboreal species since the conclusion of the great glaciations. In the present day, these plants are observed in a range of environments, from the wettest to the driest, yet they consistently exhibit a cold temperature preference.

In the bogs, one may observe Andromeda polifolia, commonly known as Andromeda, as well as Calla palustris, which reaches the southwestern limit of its range in the Vosges. Additionally, the region boasts the presence of Carex limosa, or mud sedge, and Empetrum nigrum, or crowberry. Additionally, some rare orchids, such as the heart-leaved twayblade (Listera cordata) and Traunstein's orchid (Dactylorhiza traunsteineri), are locally present.

In some lakes, some Nordic aquatic species have been identified, including the lake quillwort (Isoetes lacustris) in Lake Gérardmer, the narrow-leaved bur-reed (Sparganium angustifolium) in Lake Retournemer and Lake Longemer, and the dwarf water lily (Nuphar pumila).

On the highest peaks, at the level of the primary subalpine heath, there is evidence of the presence of the narcissus-flowered anemone (Anemone narcissiflora), the Austrian pasqueflower (Anemone scherfelii), and the Alpine hawkweed (Hieracium alpinum). However, these species are only found in the Hohneck massif. Additionally, the crispy parsley fern Cryptogram Additionally, the siliceous scree of the Alsatian slope is home to the ma crispa (Drymocallis suecica), while the boggy areas are populated by the Alpine bartsia (Bartsia alpina). The heather-dominated habitats are also home to various clubmosses, including the Alpine clubmoss (Diphasiastrum alpinum) and the three-branched clubmoss (Diphasiastrum tristachyum). Concerning the white hellebore (Veratrum album), a sizable mountain pasture plant with white flowers, it is notable that this species is particularly prevalent in the Alps and the Massif Central. However, it is only observed in the Ballon d'Alsace region.

In the forest environment and tall herb communities, one may, with some degree of success, observe the broad-leaved bellflower (Campanula latifolia) in some forest ravines, the interrupted clubmoss (Lycopodium annotinum), the twisted-stalk (Streptopus amplexifolius), a variety of Solomon's seal with a twisted stem found in tall herb communities alongside Adenostyles and aconites, as well as some fern species. The following fern species may be observed: Dryopteris remota, Athyrium distentifolium, and Polystichum braunii.

With regard to the endemic flora of the Vosges, there is a paucity of species. Two notable exceptions are a subspecies of the mountain pansy (Viola lutea subsp. elegans) and Baumgarten's bellflower (Campanula baumgartenii), which are endemic to the northern Vosges.

== See also ==
- Vosges
- Ballons des Vosges Nature Park
- Northern Vosges Regional Nature Park

== Bibliography ==
- Blamey, Marjorie; Grey-Wilson, Christopher (1996). Guide des fleurs de montagne (in French). Delachaux et niestlé. ISBN 260301369-6.
- Cholet, J; Magnon, G (2010). Tourbières des montagnes françaises - Nouveaux éléments de connaissance, de réflexion & de gestion (in French). Pôle-relais Tourbières & Fédération des Conservatoires d'Espaces Naturels. Archived from the original on December 7, 2022.
- Collectif (1999). Parc naturel régional des Ballons des Vosges (in French). Gallimard. ISBN 2742405631.
- Collectif (2004). Vosges. Encyclopédies Bonneton (in French). Bonneton. ISBN 9782862533131.
- Conservatoire des espaces naturels de Franche-Comté (2008). Les tourbières, un milieu à préserver... Du constat à l'action en Franche-Comté (PDF) (in French). Archived from the original on December 26, 2021.
- IGN (2007). Inventaire forestier national - Massif vosgien et collines périphériques (PDF) (in French). Archived from the original on August 20, 2025.
- Kuentz, André (2013). Randonnées botaniques dans les Vosges / La Haute-Alsace (in French). Illfurth: Saint-Brice. ISBN 978-2-918854-05-0. OCLC 863034726.
- Muller, Serge (2006). Les plantes protégées de Lorraine : distribution, écologie, conservation. Parthénope (in French). Biotope. ISBN 9782914817080.
- Parmentelat, Hervé (2010). Merveilles des Vosges : Fleurs, arbres et milieux naturels remarquables (in French). Place Stanislas. ISBN 978-2-35578-052-3. OCLC 690490738.
- Vernier, François (1999). Les plantes de nos sous-bois (in French). ONF. ISBN 2842070682.
