= List of lakes of France =

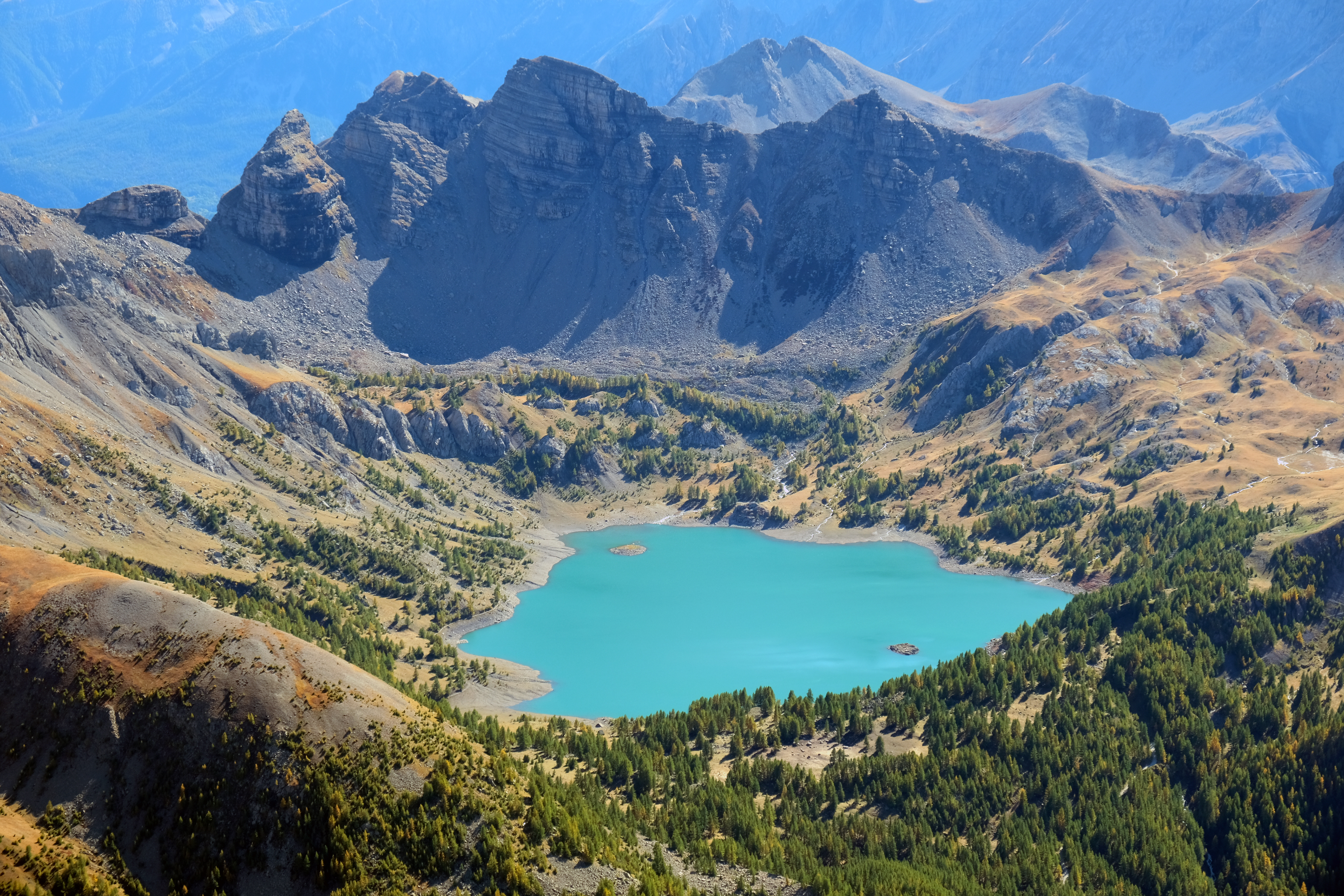
Lac d'Allos in the Mercantour National Park

This list of lakes in France roughly distinguishes three categories: the mountain lakes, sorted first by massif, and then by départements; the lakes in plains, sorted by river basin; and the coastal lakes.

Lake Geneva (Lac Léman), the largest in western Europe with 582 km^{2} (225 sq mi), partly in France, partly in Switzerland, is listed in Haute-Savoie for its French part.

== Mountain lakes ==
The lakes of mountain massifs can be natural, often of glaciary origin (G), or volcanic (V), or artificial, generally built for hydraulic energy purposes (H) or flow regulation (F).

=== Alps ===
==== Alpes-de-Haute-Provence ====
- Lac d'Allos in the Mercantour National Park
- Lac Bleu in the Haute-Ubaye
- Lac Bleu-italien in the Haute-Ubaye
- Lacs du col-de-Longet in the Haute-Ubaye
- Lac d'Esparron
- Lac de l'Étoile in the Haute-Ubaye
- Lac du Lauzanier
- Lac long in the Haute-Ubaye
- Lac de Longet in the Haute-Ubaye
- Lac-grand de Marinet in the Haute-Ubaye
- Lac-petit de Marinet in the Haute-Ubaye
- Lac des Neuf Couleurs in the Haute-Ubaye
- Lac Noir in the Haute-Ubaye
- Lac de la Noire in the Haute-Ubaye
- Lac Rond in the Haute-Ubaye
- Lac de Serre-Ponçon (H) (F)
- Lac Vert in the Haute-Ubaye

==== Hautes-Alpes ====
- Grand Lac in the Briançonnais
- Lac de l'Ascension in the Queyras
- Lac d'Asti in the Queyras
- Lac des Béraudes in the Briançonnais
- Lac de la Blanche in the Queyras
- Lac Blanchet in the Queyras
- Lac Chalantiés in the Queyras
- Lac Clausis in the Queyras
- Lac de Combeynot in the massif des Écrins
- Lac des Cordes in the Queyras
- Lac du Crachet in the Embrunnais
- Lac de Cristol in the Briançonnais
- Lac de Dormillouse in the massif des Écrins
- Lac Haut-des-Drayères or Lac sans-nom-au-dessus-des-Drayères, in the Briançonnais
- Lac Égorgeou in the Queyras
- Lac Escur in the Queyras
- Lac des Estaris in the massif des Écrins
- Lac de l'Eychassier in the Queyras
- Lac de l'Eychauda in the massif des Écrins
- Lac Faravel in the massif des Écrins
- Lac Foréant in the Queyras
- Lac Gimont in the Briançonnais
- Lac Jean Rostand in the Queyras
- Lacs Jumeaux in the massif des Écrins
- Lac Lacroix in the Queyras
- Lac Lestio in the Queyras
- Lac Laramon in the Briançonnais
- Grand lac du Lauzet in the Queyras
- Lac moyen du Lauzet in the Queyras
- Lac du Lauzon in the massif des Écrins
- Lac Lauzon in the Queyras
- Lac Lauzon de Furfande in the Queyras
- Lac Long in the Briançonnais
- Lac Long in the massif des Écrins
- Lac Malrif in the Queyras
- Lac Mézan in the Queyras
- Lac Miroir in the Queyras
- Lac des Muandes in the Briançonnais
- Lac Néal in the Queyras
- Lac Haut-Néal or Lac sans-nom-au-dessus-du-Lac-Néal, in the Queyras
- Lac des Neuf-couleurs in the Queyras
- Lac Noir in the Briançonnais
- Lac d'Orcières-Merlette
- Grand lac de l'Oule in the Briançonnais
- Lac de l'Orceyrette in the Briançonnais
- Lac Palluel in the massif des Écrins
- Lac Petit-Laus in the Queyras
- Lac Peyron in the Briançonnais
- Lac des Pisses in the massif des Écrins
- Lac de la Ponsonnière in the Briançonnais
- Lac Profond in the massif des Écrins
- Lac de Puy Vachier in the massif des Écrins
- Lac de Rasis in the Queyras
- Lac ouest de Rasis in the Queyras
- Lac Rond in the Briançonnais
- Lac des Rouites in the Queyras
- Lac Sainte-Anne in the Queyras
- Lac Sainte-Marguerite in the Embrunnais
- Lac Saraille in the Briançonnais
- Lac du Serpent in the Briançonnais
- Lac des Sirènes in the massif des Écrins
- Lac Soulier in the Queyras
- Lac de Souliers

==== Alpes-Maritimes ====
- Lac Autier in the Mercantour-Argentera
- Lac des Babarottes in the Tinée
- Lac Balaour (Isolette) in the Vésubie
- Lac du Barn in the Vésubie
- Lac de Beuil in the Cians
- Lacs Bessons in the Vésubie
- Lac Blanc in the Vésubie
- Lac du Boréon in the Vésubie
- Lacs des Bresses in the Vésubie
- Lac Cabret in the Vésubie
- Lac Chaffour in the Tinée
- Lac du Cimon in the Tinée
- Lacs de l'Estrop (Entraunes)
- Lac de Fenestre in the Vésubie
- Lac Fer in the Tinée
- Lac Fourchas in the Tinée
- Lac de la Fous in the Mercantour-Argentera
- Lacs de Frémamorte in the Vésubie
- Lacs de Gialorgues in the Tinée
- Lac de Graveirette in the Vésubie
- Lacs Les Laussets in the Tinée
- Lac Long in the Mercantour-Argentera
- Lacs Malignes in the Tinée
- Lacs Marie in the Tinée
- Lac du Mercantour in the Vésubie
- Lacs des Millefonts in the Valdeblore
- Lac de la Montagnette in the Tinée
- Lacs de Morgon in the Tinée
- Lac Nègre in the Vésubie
- Lac Niré in the Mercantour-Argentera
- Lac Pétrus in the Tinée
- Lacs de Prals in the Vésubie
- Lac de Privola in the Tinée
- Lac de Rabuons in the Tinée
- Lac de Scluos in the Vésubie
- Lac de Tavel in the Tinée
- Lacs de Tenibre in the Tinée
- Lacs des Terres Rouges in the Tinée
- Lac de Trécolpas in the Vésubie
- Lacs Varicles in the Tinée
- Lacs de Vens in the Tinée

==== Isère ====
- Lac Achard in the massif de Belledonne
- Lac Besson in the massif des Rousses
- Lac Bramant in the massif des Rousses
- Lac Brouffier in the massif du Taillefer
- Lac du Chambon in the massif de l'Oisans
- Lac Claret in the massif de Belledonne
- Lac de la Coche in the massif de Belledonne
- Lac de Croz in the massif de Belledonne
- Lac du Crozet in the massif de Belledonne
- Lac de la Fare in the massif des Rousses
- Lac Faucille in the massif des Rousses
- Lac Fourchu in the massif du Taillefer
- Lac de Grand'Maison at the Vallon de l'Eau d'Olle
- Lac de la Grande-Sître in the massif de Belledonne
- Lac Guichard in the massif des Rousses
- Lac du Lauvitel in the massif des Écrins, 350,000 m²
- Lac Lérié in the massif de l'Oisans
- Lac Merlat in the massif de Belledonne
- Lac du Milieu in the massif des Rousses
- Lac Noir in the massif de l'Oisans
- Lac Noir in the massif des Rousses
- Lac Noir d'Emparis in the massif de l'Oisans
- Lac de Paladru (G)
- Lac du Plan in the massif de l'Oisans
- Lac du Pontet in the massif de l'Oisans
- Lac du Poursollet in the massif du Taillefer
- Lac Potet in the massif des Rousses
- Lac du Verney in the massif des Grandes Rousses

==== Savoie ====
- Grand Lac in the massif des Grandes Rousses
- Lac d'Aiguebelette
- Lac de l'Arpont in the massif de la Vanoise
- Lac des Assiettes at the Col de la Vanoise
- Lac de la Bailletta at Val d'Isère
- Lac de Bissorte in Valmeinier
- Lac Blanc in the massif du Mont-Cenis
- Lac Blanc in the Vallée du Clou
- Lac Blanc
- Lac Blanc in the massif de la Vanoise
- Lac Blanc in the massif des Grandes Rousses
- Lac Blanc in the massif de la Vanoise
- Lac du Bourget at Aix-les-Bains
- Lac Brutet in the Vallée du Clou
- Lac Carrelet in the massif des Grandes Rousses
- Lac des Cerces
- Lac du Chardonnet at Tignes
- Lac de Chasseforêt in the massif de la Vanoise
- Lac du Chevril at Tignes
- Lac du Clos at Moûtiers
- Lac du Clou in the Vallée du Clou
- Lac de la Croix in the massif d'Allevard
- Lac des Évettes in the massif de la Vanoise, 30,000 m²
- Lac de la Fare in the massif des Grandes Rousses
- Lac de la Girotte in the Beaufortin
- Lac de la Gittaz in the Beaufortin
- Lac de la Glière in the massif de la Vanoise
- Lac Grand-Ban
- Lac du Lait in the massif de la Vanoise
- Lacs de la Leisse at the Vallon de la Leisse
- Lac Long at the Col de la Vanoise
- Lac le Lou in the massif de la Vanoise
- Lac du Milieu in the massif des Grandes Rousses
- Lac du Mont-Cenis in the massif du Mont-Cenis
- Lac du Mont-Coua in the massif de la Vanoise
- Lacs des Nettes at the Vallon de la Leisse
- Lac Noir in the Vallée du Clou
- Lac Noir in the Vallée de la Sassière
- Lac de l'Ouillette at Val d'Isère
- Lac de la Partie in the massif de la Vanoise
- Lac du Pelve at the glacier du Pelve
- Lac du Plan-d'Amont in the massif de la Vanoise
- Lac du Plan-d'Aval in the massif de la Vanoise
- Lac du Plan-du-Lac in the massif de la Vanoise
- Lacs de la Roche-Ferran in the massif de la Vanoise
- Lac Rond at the Col de la Vanoise
- Lac Rond
- Lac de Roselend in the Beaufortin
- Lac de Saint-André at the Marches
- Lac de Saint-Clair vers La Rochette
- Lac de Saint-Hélène at Saint-Hélène-du-Lac
- Lac de Saint-Guérin in the Beaufortin
- Lac de Saint-Jean-de-Maurienne at Saint-Jean-de-Maurienne
- Lac du Santel at Tignes
- Lac de la Sassière at Tignes
- Lac de Savine in the massif du Mont-Cenis
- Lac de Tignes (H) at Tignes
- Lac de Toeda in the massif de la Vanoise
- Lac Tournant in the massif des Grandes Rousses
- Lac du Vallon under the Aiguille de Scolette
- Lacs Verdet in the Vallée du Clou

==== Haute-Savoie ====
- Lac de l'Aiguillette
- Lac d'Annecy, 27.6 km²
- Lac d'Arvour, south of the Cornettes de Bise
- Lac Bénit at the Mont-Saxonnex, under the chaîne du Bargy
- Marais de la Braille between Saint-Félix and Bloye
- Lac du Brévent at Chamonix
- Lacs de la Cavettaz called Lacs de Passy at Passy
- Lac de Charamillon north of the glacier du Tour
- Lac de la Case
- Lac des Confins
- Lac de Darbon, south of the La Dent d'Oche
- Lac des Dronières at Cruseilles
- Lac de Fontaine at Fontaine
- Lac de Génissiat at the barrage de Génissiat (for the part in Savoy)
- Lac de Gers
- Lac des Gorges du Fier at Montrottier
- Lac de la Griaz at the Houches
- Lac de Jotty at the Esserts
- Lacs Jovet at the Contamines-Montjoie
- Lac Léman (French part)
- Lac de Lessy at the col de la Forclaz-Lessy, under the Pic de Jallouvre
- Étang de Machilly at Machilly
- Lac du Môle between Viuz-en-Sallaz and Saint-Jeoire
- Lac de Montriond, at Montriond
- Lac de la Mouille
- Lac Noir in the Aiguilles Rouges
- Lac de Pététoz
- Lac des Plagnes
- Lac de Pormenaz in the Passy country park
- Lac de Préssy at Taninges
- Lac de Tavaneuse
- Lac de Vallon, at La Chèvrerie

=== Ardennes ===
- Lac des Vieilles Forges

=== Jura Mountains ===
==== Ain ====
- Lac d'Ambléon
- Lac d'Arboréiaz
- Lac d'Armaille
- Lac de Chavoley
- Lac de Coiselet
- Lac de Conflans
- Lacs de Conzieu
- Lac Genin
- Lac de Morgnieu
- Lac de Nantua
- Lac de Sylans

==== Doubs ====
- Lac de Bouverans
- Lac des Brenets
- Lac de Malpas
- Lac de Moron
- Lac des Mortes
- Lac de Remoray
- Lac de Saint-Point

==== Jura ====
- Lac de l'Abbaye
- Lac d'Antre
- Lac de l'Assencière
- Lac de Bellefontaine
- Lac des Bez
- Lac de Bonlieu
- Lac de Chalain
- Lac de Chambly
- Lac de Chanon
- Lacs de Clairvaux
- Lac de Coiselet
- Lac de Conflans
- Lac à la Dame
- Lac de la Fauge
- Lac du Fort-du-Plasne
- Lac du Fioget
- Lac d'Ilay
- Lacs de Maclu
- Lac de Narlay
- Lac des Rousses
- Lac du Val
- Lac du Vernois
- Lac de Viry
- Lac de Vouglans

=== Massif Central ===
==== Aveyron ====
- Étang de la Brienne
- Lac de Maury

==== Cantal ====
- Lac de Bort-les-Orgues (H)

==== Creuse ====
- Lac de Vassivière (H)

==== Haute-Vienne ====
- Lac de Saint-Pardoux

==== Hérault ====
- Lac d'Avène

==== Lot ====
- Lac du Tolerme

==== Lozère ====
- Étang de Barrandon
- Lac de Ganivet
- Lac du Moulinet
- Lac de Naussac
- Lac de Villefort

==== Puy-de-Dôme ====
- Étang de Lachamp
- Gour de Tazenat (V)
- Lac d'Aydat (V)
- Lac de Bourdouze
- Lac Chambon (V)
- Lac Chauvet (V)
- Lac de Guéry (V)
- Lac des Hermines
- Lac de Montcineyre
- Lac Pavin (V), Besse-en-Chandesse, 440,000 m²
- Lac de Servière (V)

==== Tarn ====
- Lac du Laouzas

=== Pyrénées ===
==== Ariège ====
- Étang d'Araing
- Étang de Brouquenat
- Étang de Peyregrand
- Étang des Redouneilles des brebis
- Étang des Redouneilles des vaches
- Étang Long
- Étangs de Neych
- Lac de Gnioure
- Lac d'Izourt
- Lac de Mondély

==== Haute-Garonne ====
- Lac d'Espingo
- Lac d'Oô
- Lac du Portillon

==== Hautes-Pyrénées ====
- Gaube Lake
- Lac d'Arredoun
- Lac d'Aubert
- Lac d'Aumar
- Lac d'Aygue Rouye
- Lac du Barbat
- Lac de Bareilles
- Lac de Barroude
- Lac de Batbielh
- Lac Bleu de Lesponne
- Lac de Caderolles
- Lac du Campana
- Lac de Cap-de-Long
- Lac d'Estaing
- Lac de Madamète
- Lac de Migouélou
- Lac d'Oredon
- Lac de l'Oule
- Lac d'Ourrec
- Lac du Pourtet
- Lac Nère
- Lac de Suyen
- Réservoir des Laquets

==== Pyrénées-Atlantiques ====
- Lac d'Ansabère
- Lacs d'Arrémoulit
- Lac d'Arrious
- Lac d'Artouste
- Lacs de Batboucou
- Lac Bersau
- Lac de Bious-Artigues
- Lac de Castet
- Lac de Fabrèges
- Lac Gentau
- Lac d'Isabe
- Lac de Saint-Pée-sur-Nivelle
- Lacs d'Arrémoulit
- Lacs de Batboucou
- Lacs de Carnau
- Lac de Saint-Pée-sur-Nivelle

==== Pyrénées-Orientales ====
- Estany de la Balmeta
- Estany de la Pradella
- Étang de Canet-Saint-Nazaire
- Étang du Lanoux
- Étang de Leucate
- Lac d'Aude
- Lac de Coumasse
- Lac de Matemale (2.3 km²) in the commune of Matemale

=== Vosges ===
==== Meurthe-et-Moselle ====
- Lac de Pierre-Percée (H)

==== Haut-Rhin ====
- Lac d'Alfeld (F)
- Altenweiher (G)
- Lac du Ballon
- Lac Blanc
- Fischboedle
- Lac du Grand Neuweiher
- Lac de Kruth-Wildenstein (F)
- Lac du Lachtelweiher
- Lac de la Lauch
- Lac Noir
- Lac des Perches
- Lac du Petit Neuweiher
- Schiessrothried (G)
- Lac de Sewen
- Lac des Truites
- Lac Vert

==== Haute-Saône ====
- Bassin de Champagney (F)

==== Vosges ====
- Lac de Blanchemer
- Lac de Bouzey (F)
- Lac des Corbeaux
- Lac de Gérardmer (G) : 1.16 km²
- Lac de la Lande
- Lac de Lispach
- Lac de Longemer (G) : 0.76 km²
- Lac de la Plaine
- Lac de Retournemer
- Lac de la Ténine

==== Territoire de Belfort ====
- Étang de Malsaucy
- Étang de la Véronne

== Lakes in plains ==
The lakes in this category can be natural (N) or designed to be used as reservoirs (R).

=== Basin of the Garonne ===
- Lac de Pareloup (R)

=== Basin of the Loire ===
- Lac de Chambon
- Lac de Chamboux (R)
- Lac de Chaumeçon
- Lac de Grand-Lieu (N)
- Lac de Grangent (R)
- Lac de Saint-Agnan
- Étangs de Sologne
- Lac de Villerest

=== Basin of the Moselle ===
- Étang de Gondrexange
- Étang de Hanau
- Étang de Lindre
- Lac de Madine
- Étang du Stock

=== Basin of the Nièvre ===
- Étangs de Vaux et de Baye

=== Basin of the Seine ===
- Lac Amance (R)
- Lac du Bourdon
- Lac de Charmes (R)
- Lac de Créteil
- Lac du Crescent
- Lac du Der-Chantecoq (R)
- Lac d'Enghien
- Lac de Gravelle
- Lac de la Liez (R)
- Lac de la Mouche (R)
- Lac d'Orient (R)
- Lac de Pannecière (R)
- Lac de Pont (R)
- Lac de Saint-Mandé
- Lac des Settons (R)
- Lac de Viry-Châtillon
- Lac du Temple (R)

=== Basin of the Rhine ===
- Lac du Baggersee
- Lac de Michelbach

=== Basin of the Rhône ===
- Étang de la Bonde
- Réservoir de Cercey (R)
- Étangs des Dombes
- Réservoir de Grosbois (R)
- Lac de Panthier (R)
- Lac de Sainte-Croix (R)
- Lac des Sapins (R)
- Lac de Villegusien (R)

=== Others ===
- Lac de Guerlédan in Brittany
- Réservoir Saint-Michel in Brittany
- Lac de Rabodanges in Lower Normandy

== Coastal lakes ==
The lakes close to the sea can be filled with fresh water (F) or sea water (S).

=== English Channel ===
==== Pas-de-Calais ====
- Lac des Miroirs

=== Atlantic Ocean ===
- Étang d'Aureilhan
- Étang de Cazaux et de Sanguinet
- Étang de Lacanau
- Lac de Biscarrosse et de Parentis
- Lac d'Hourtin-Carcans

=== Mediterranean Sea ===
- Étang de Berre
- Étang de Thau/Bassin de Thau

=== Corsica ===
- Lac de Bettaniella
- Lac du Cinto
- Lac de Goria
- Lac de Nino
- Lac de l'Oriente

== See also ==
- List of lakes in the Kerguelen Islands
- List of bodies of water of Corsica
