= Lac d'Ourrec =

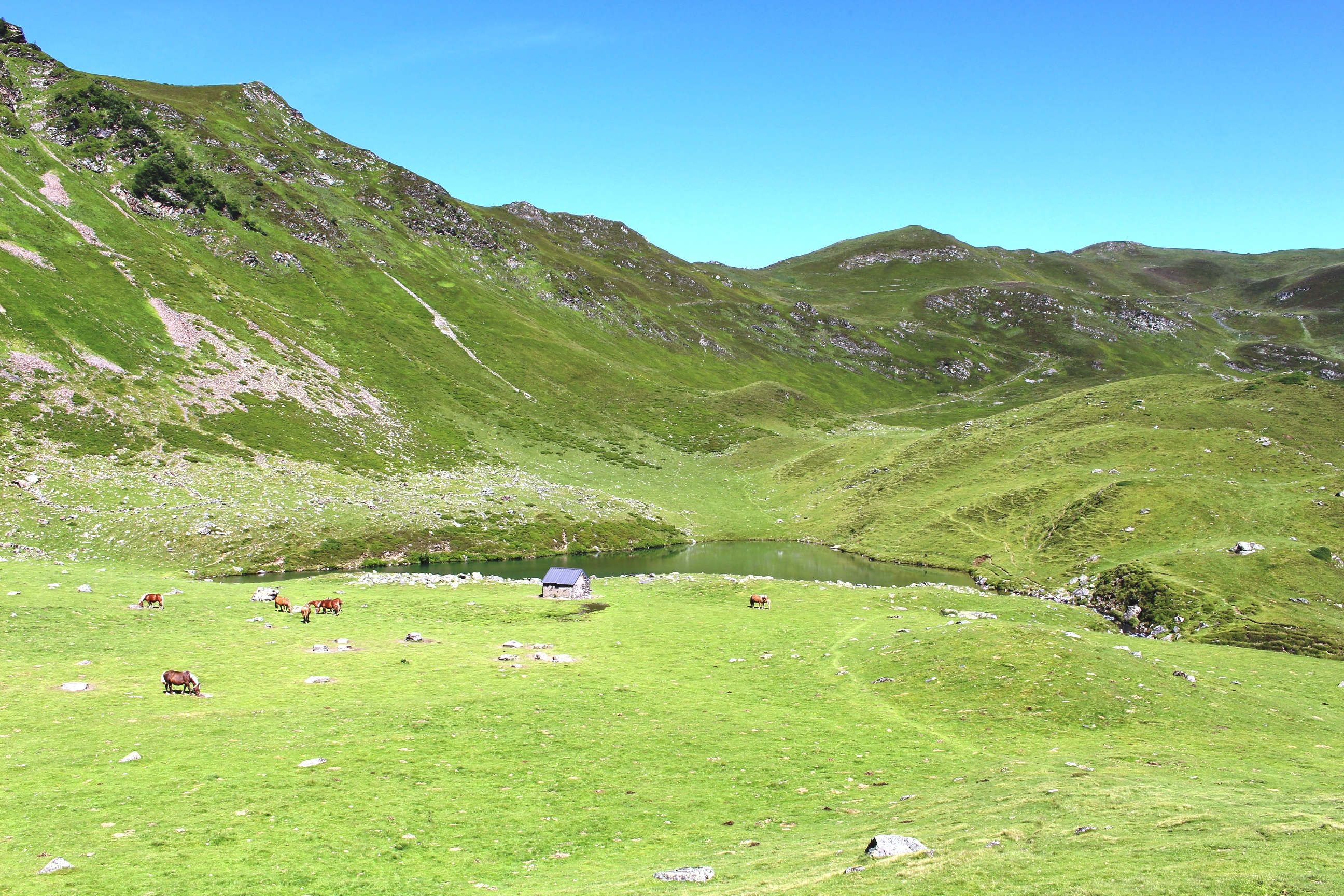
- Picture of Lac d'Ourrec Lake in 2016.

- Location within Pyrenees
- Location: Hautes-Pyrénées
- Coordinates: 42°57′01″N 00°02′38″E
- Basin countries: France
- Surface elevation: 1,667 m (5,469 ft)

Lac d'Ourrec is a lake in Hautes-Pyrénées, France.
