= Lac de Coumasse =

Lake in France

Lac de Coumasse Estany de la Comassa
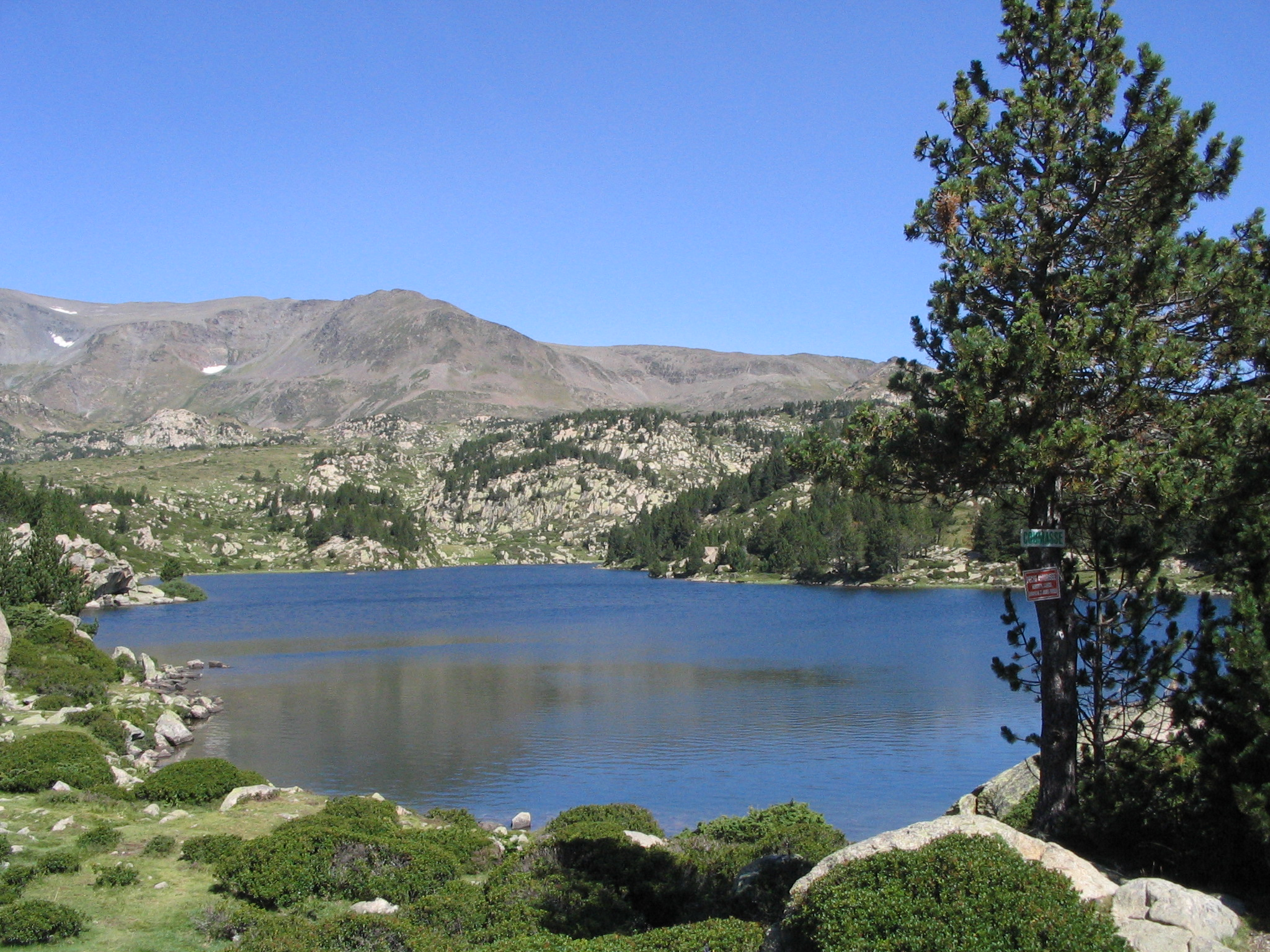

- Location within Pyrenees
- Location: Pyrénées-Orientales, Pyrénées
- Coordinates: 42.566932°N 1.976552°E
- Basin countries: France
- Surface area: 0.04 km^{2} (0.015 sq mi)
- Max. depth: 10 m (33 ft)
- Surface elevation: 2,160 m (7,090 ft)

Lac de Coumasse (French pronunciation: [lak də kumas]) or Estany de la Comassa is a lake in Pyrénées-Orientales, Pyrénées, France. At an elevation of 2,160 m, its surface area is 0.04 km^{2}.
