= Étang de Peyregrand =

Lake in France

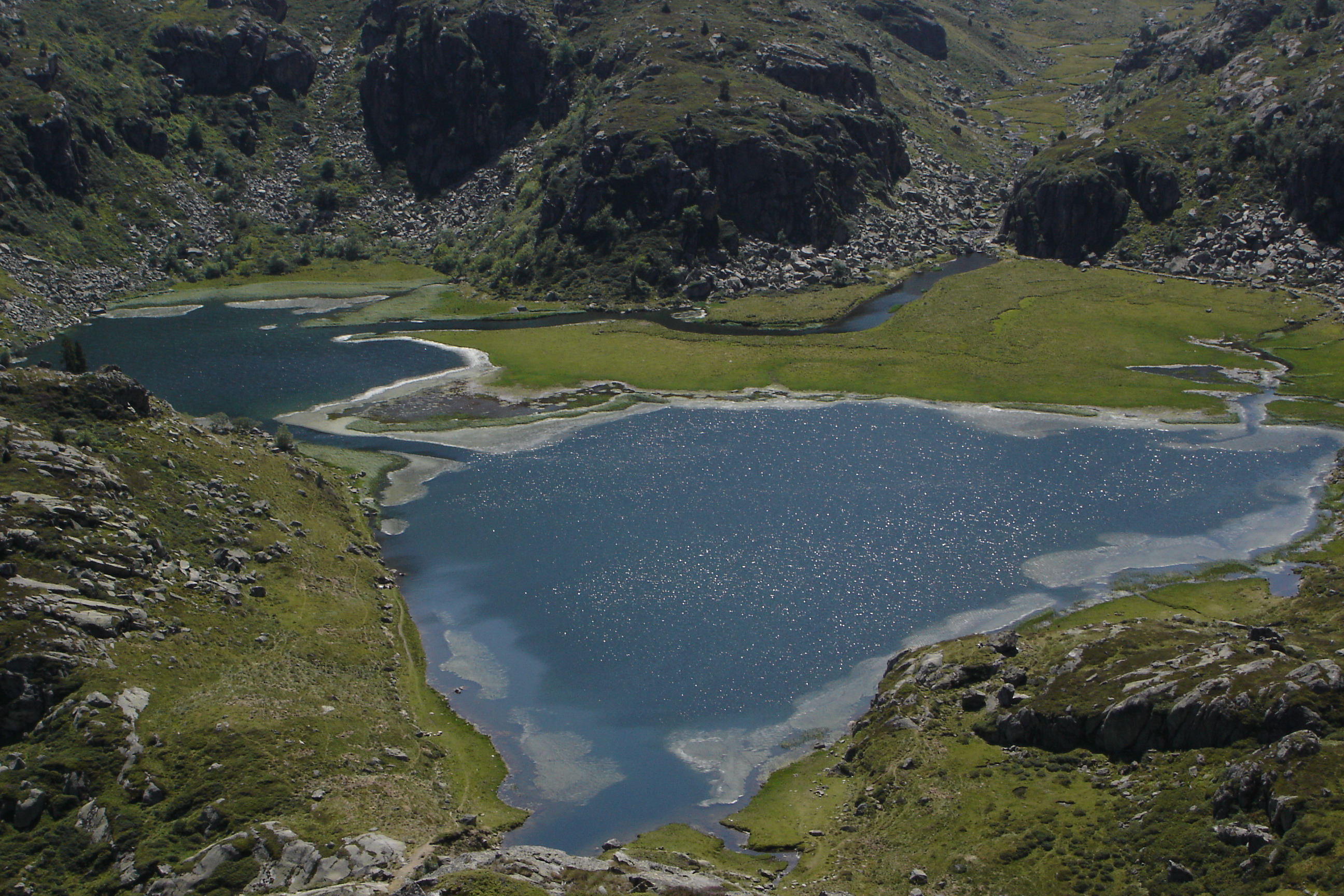

- Location within France
- Location: Ariège
- Coordinates: 42°41′00″N 01°33′52″E
- Basin countries: France
- Surface elevation: 1,898 m (6,227 ft)

Étang de Peyregrand is a lake in Ariège, France.
