= Lac Bénit =

Lake in France

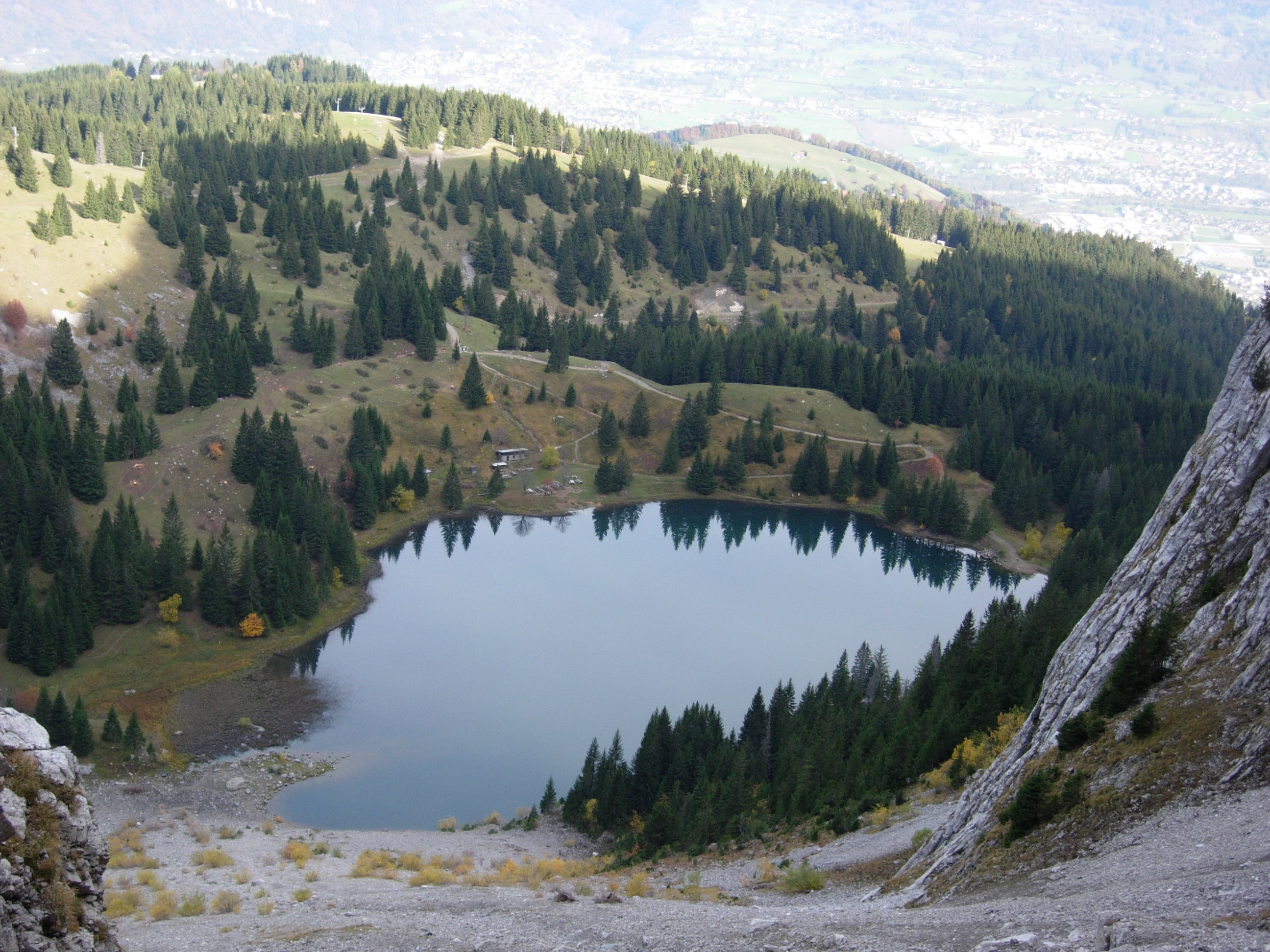

- Location within France
- Location: Haute-Savoie
- Coordinates: 46.028°N 6.505°E
- Catchment area: 90.6 ha (224 acres)
- Basin countries: France
- Surface area: 4.1 ha (10 acres)
- Max. depth: 8.7 m (29 ft)
- Surface elevation: 1,452 m (4,764 ft)

Lac Bénit is a lake that is located in the Haute-Savoie department of France. It has a surface area of 4.1 ha.
