= Lac de Bourdouze =

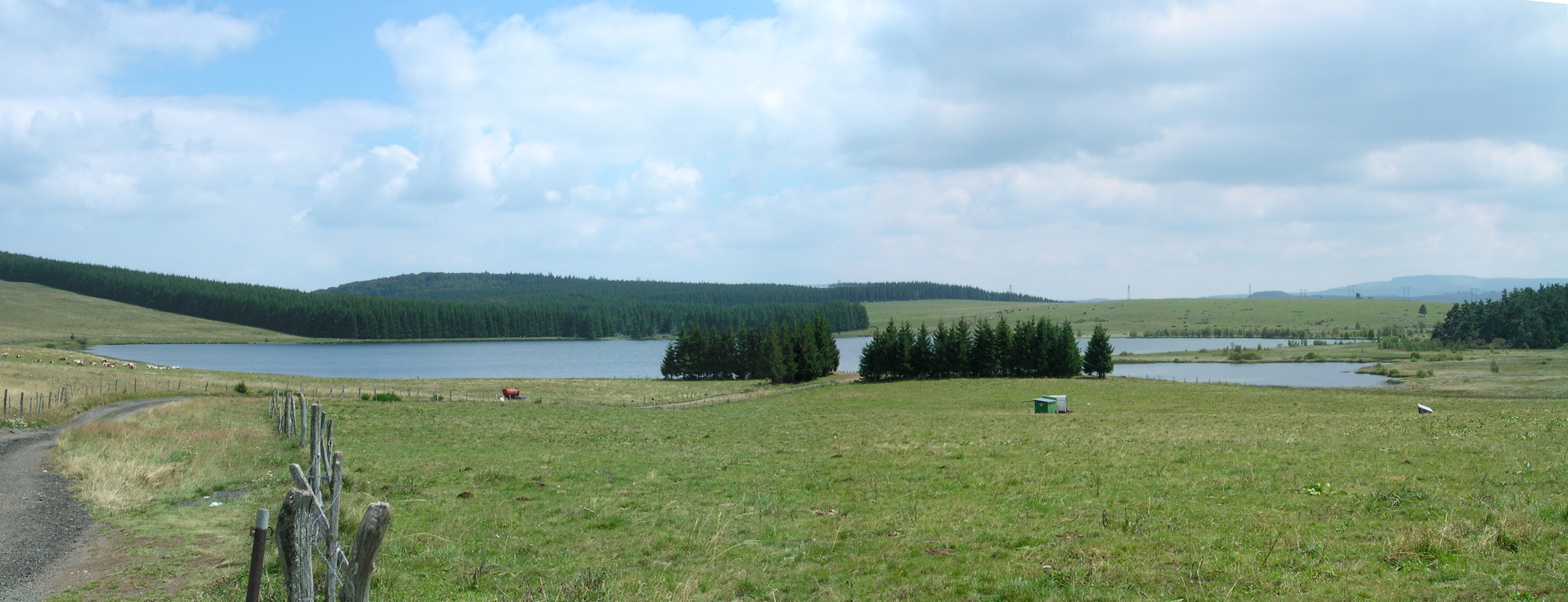

- Location within France
- Location: Puy-de-Dôme
- Coordinates: 45°28′N 2°56′E
- Basin countries: France
- Surface area: 0.15 km^{2} (0.058 sq mi)
- Max. depth: 4.5 m (15 ft)
- Surface elevation: 1,168 m (3,832 ft)

Lac de Bourdouze is a lake near Puy de Sancy in the Puy-de-Dôme department, France. At an elevation of 1168 m, its surface area is 0.15 km^{2}. The lake was formed as a result of glacial depression.
