= Lac du Pourtet =

Lake in Hautes-Pyrénées, France

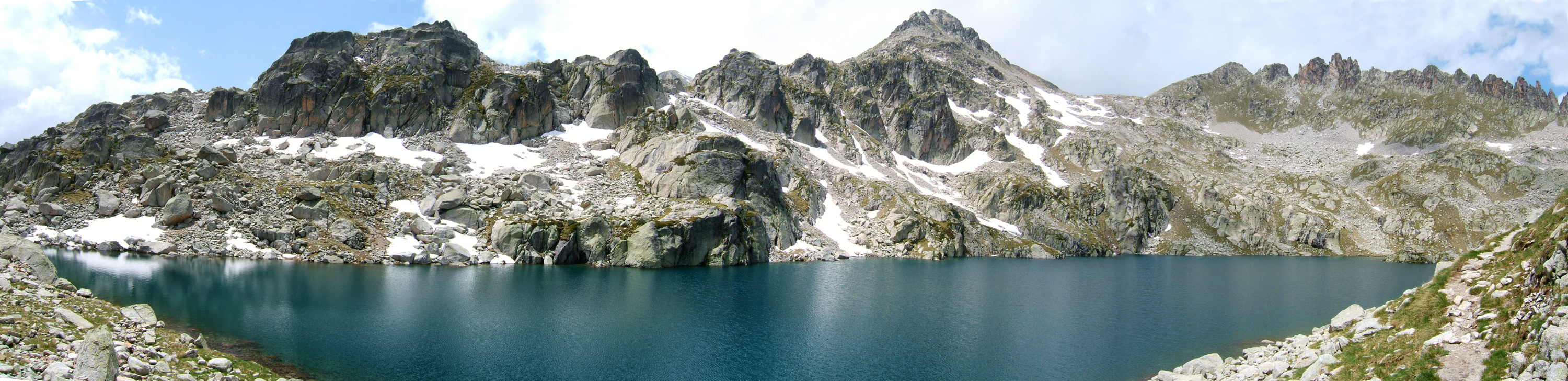

- Location within Pyrenees
- Location: Hautes-Pyrénées
- Coordinates: 42.843°N 0.203°W
- Basin countries: France
- Surface area: 0.058 km^{2} (0.022 sq mi)
- Max. depth: 13.5 m (44 ft)
- Surface elevation: 2,420 m (7,940 ft)

Lac du Pourtet is a lake in Hautes-Pyrénées, France.

== Geography ==
At an elevation of 2420 m, its surface area is 0.058 km^{2}.
