= Étang de Brouquenat =

Lake in France

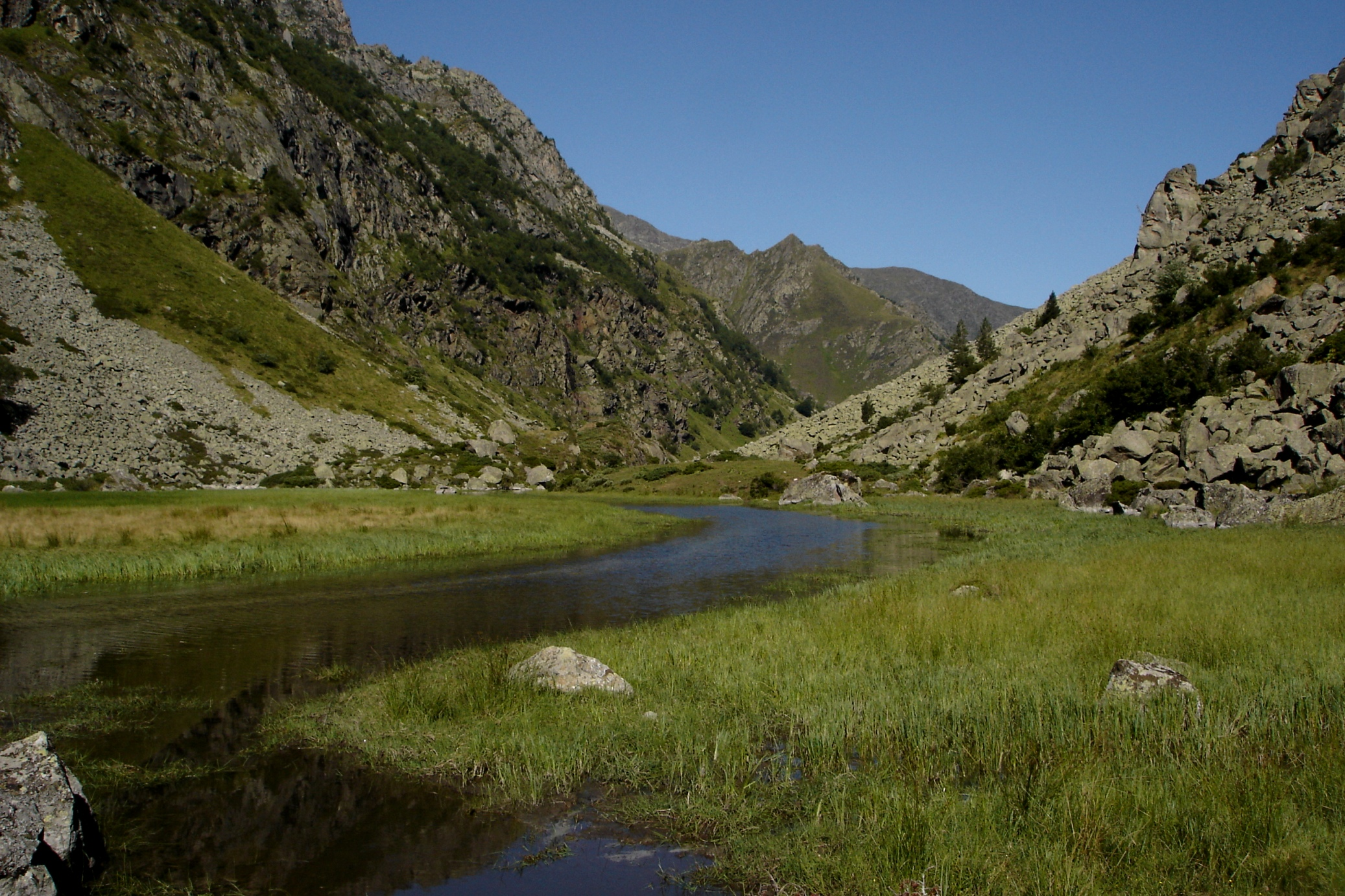

- Location within France
- Location: Ariège
- Coordinates: 42°42′05″N 01°34′19″E
- Basin countries: France
- Surface elevation: 1,599 m (5,246 ft)

Étang de Brouquenat is a lake in Ariège, France.
