= Lake Bramant =

Lake in France

- Location within France
- Location: Isère
- Coordinates: 45°12′0″N 6°10′35″E
- Basin countries: France
- Max. length: 600 m (2,000 ft)
- Max. width: 400 m (1,300 ft)
- Max. depth: 39 m (128 ft)
- Surface elevation: 2,448 m (8,031 ft)

Lake Bramant (French: Lac Bramant) is a lake in the Grandes Rousses massif of the French Alps.
