= Lac de Ganivet =

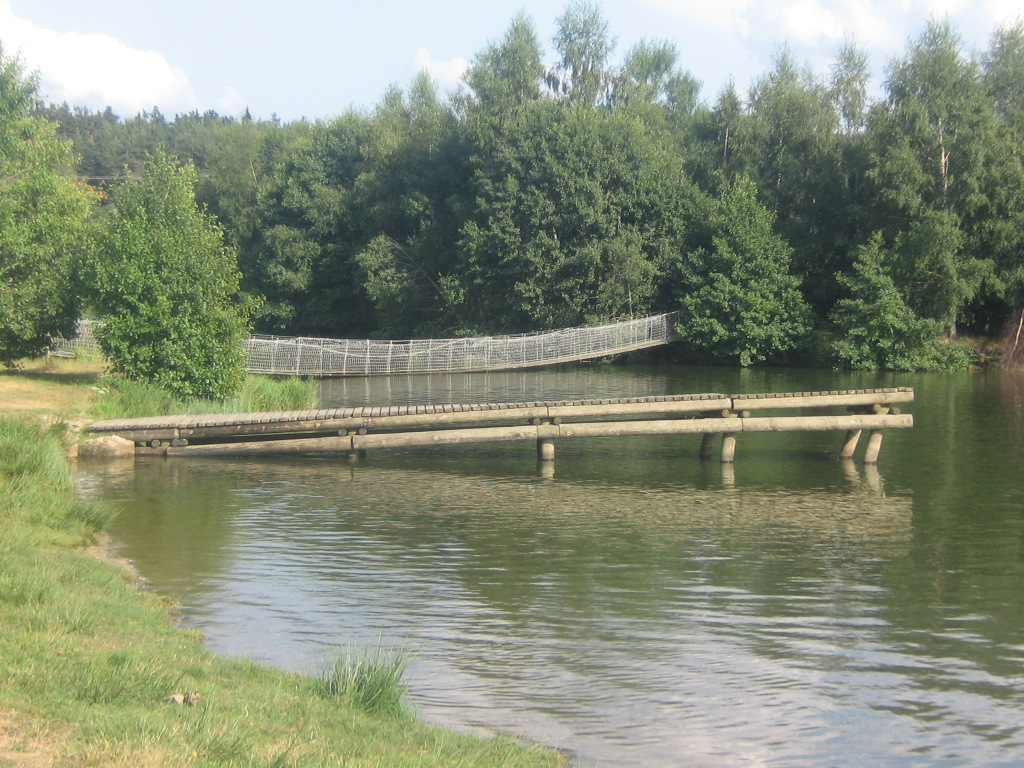

- Location within France
- Location: Lozère
- Coordinates: 44°38′50″N 3°24′45″E
- Type: artificialReservoir
- Primary inflows: Cologne, Ruisseau de Fontbonne, Ruisseau de Chanisse
- Primary outflows: Cologne
- Basin countries: France
- Max. length: 495 m (1,624 ft)
- Max. width: 425 m (1,394 ft)
- Surface area: 0.12 km^{2} (0.046 sq mi)
- Water volume: 360,000 m^{3} (13,000,000 cu ft)
- Islands: one

Lac de Ganivet is a lake in Lozère, France. Its surface area is 0.12 km^{2}.
