= Lac de la Plaine =

Lake in France

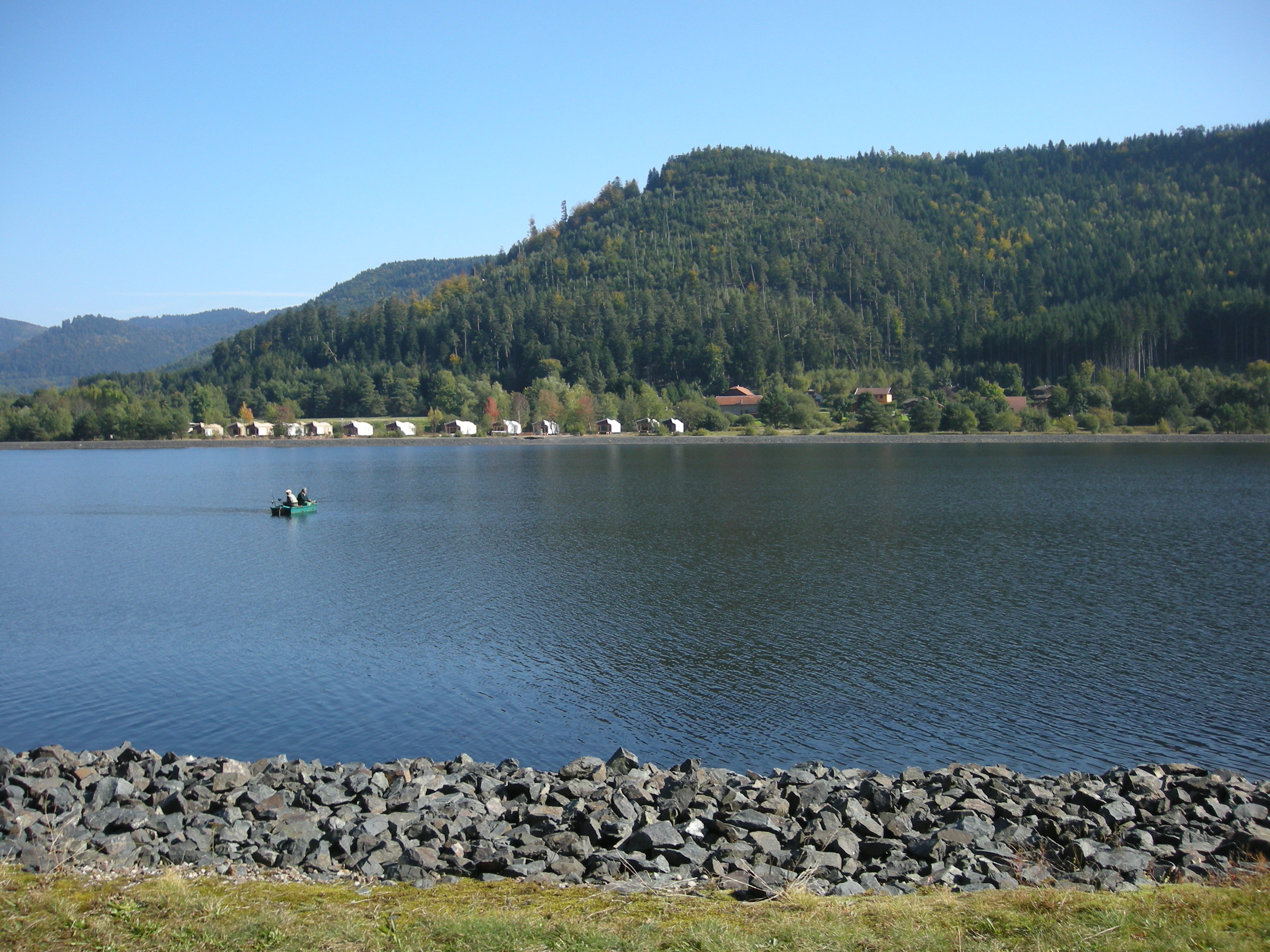

- Location within Grand Est
- Location: Grand Est
- Coordinates: 48.446620°N 6.934083°E
- Type: artificial
- Basin countries: France
- Max. length: 1.04 km (0.65 mi)
- Max. width: 300 m (980 ft)
- Surface area: 30 ha (74 acres)
- Water volume: 0.5 hm^{3} (410 acre⋅ft)

Lac de la Plaine (French pronunciation: [lak də la plɛn]) is a lake on the border of the departments Meurthe-et-Moselle and Vosges, Grand Est, France.
