= Étang de Lachamp =

Lake in France

- Location within France
- Location: Puy-de-Dôme
- Coordinates: 45°55′47″N 2°57′0″E
- Primary outflows: Morge
- Basin countries: France
- Surface area: 0.13 km^{2} (0.050 sq mi)
- Surface elevation: 820 m (2,690 ft)

Étang de Lachamp is a lake south of the commune of Manzat, Puy-de-Dôme, France. At an elevation of 820 m, its surface area is 7 hectares. It is situated in one of the rare wetlands of the Dôme mountains.
