= Lac de Gravelle =

Lake in bois de Vincennes, Paris, France

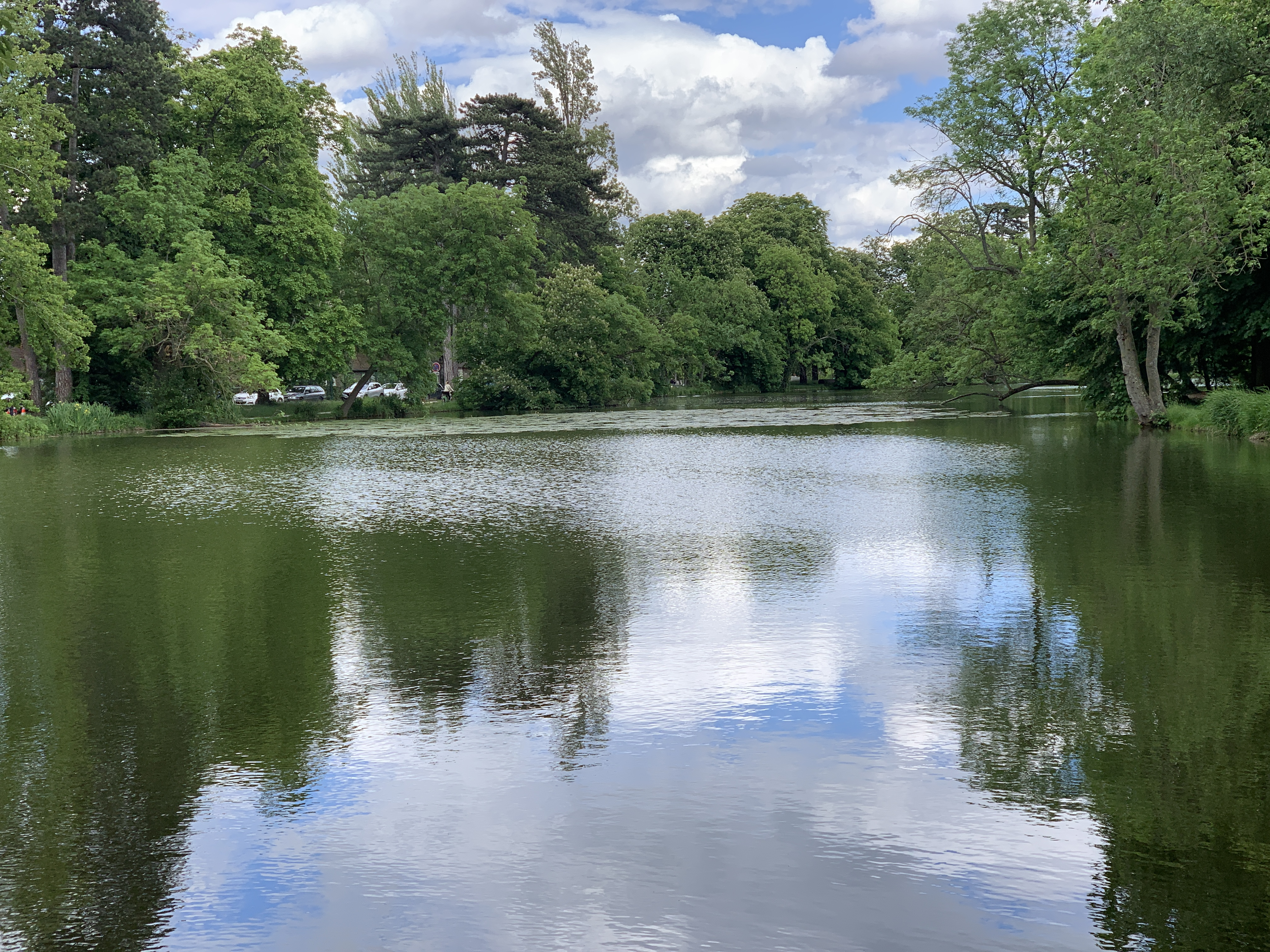

- Location within Paris
- Location: Paris
- Coordinates: 48.819722°N 2.449167°E
- Type: artificial
- Basin countries: France
- Max. length: 0.25 km (0.16 mi)
- Max. width: 0.05 km (0.031 mi)
- Surface area: 0.01 km^{2} (0.0039 sq mi)
- Surface elevation: 70 m (230 ft)

Lac de Gravelle is a lake in Paris, France. At an elevation of 70 m, its surface area is 0.01 km^{2}.
