= Lac de la Mouille =

Lake in France

- Location within France
- Location: Haute-Savoie
- Coordinates: 46°15′45″N 6°51′18″E
- Basin countries: France
- Surface elevation: 1,570 m (5,150 ft)

Lac de la Mouille is a lake in Haute-Savoie, France.
