= Lac Achard =

Lake in Isère, France

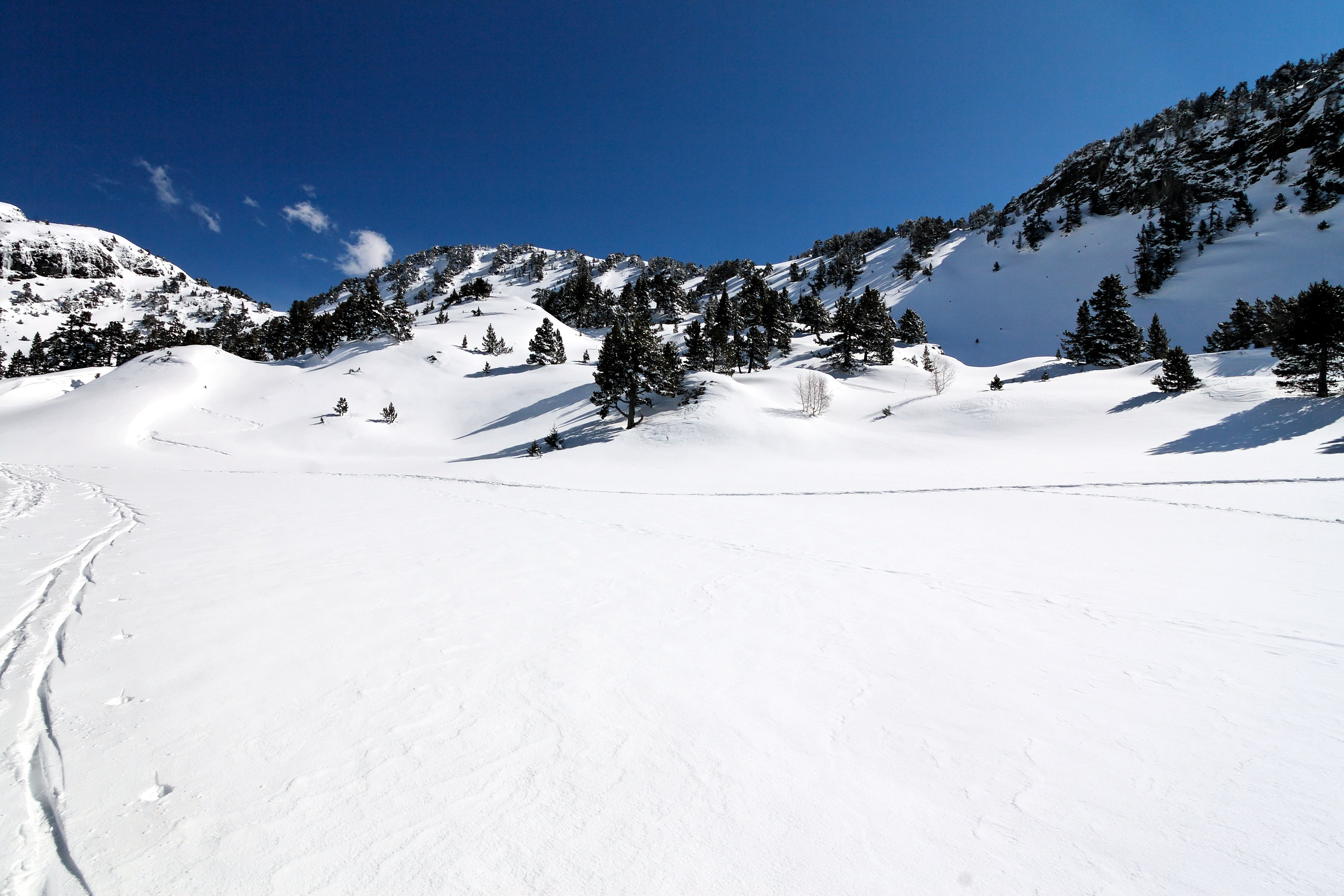

- Location within France
- Location: Isère
- Coordinates: 45°06′50″N 5°54′05″E
- Primary inflows: 'precipitation
- Primary outflows: L'Arselle
- Basin countries: France
- Surface elevation: 1,917 m (6,289 ft)
- Islands: none

Lac Achard is a lake in Isère, France.
