= Étang de la Brienne =

Lake in France

Étang de la Brienne Lac de Planèzes
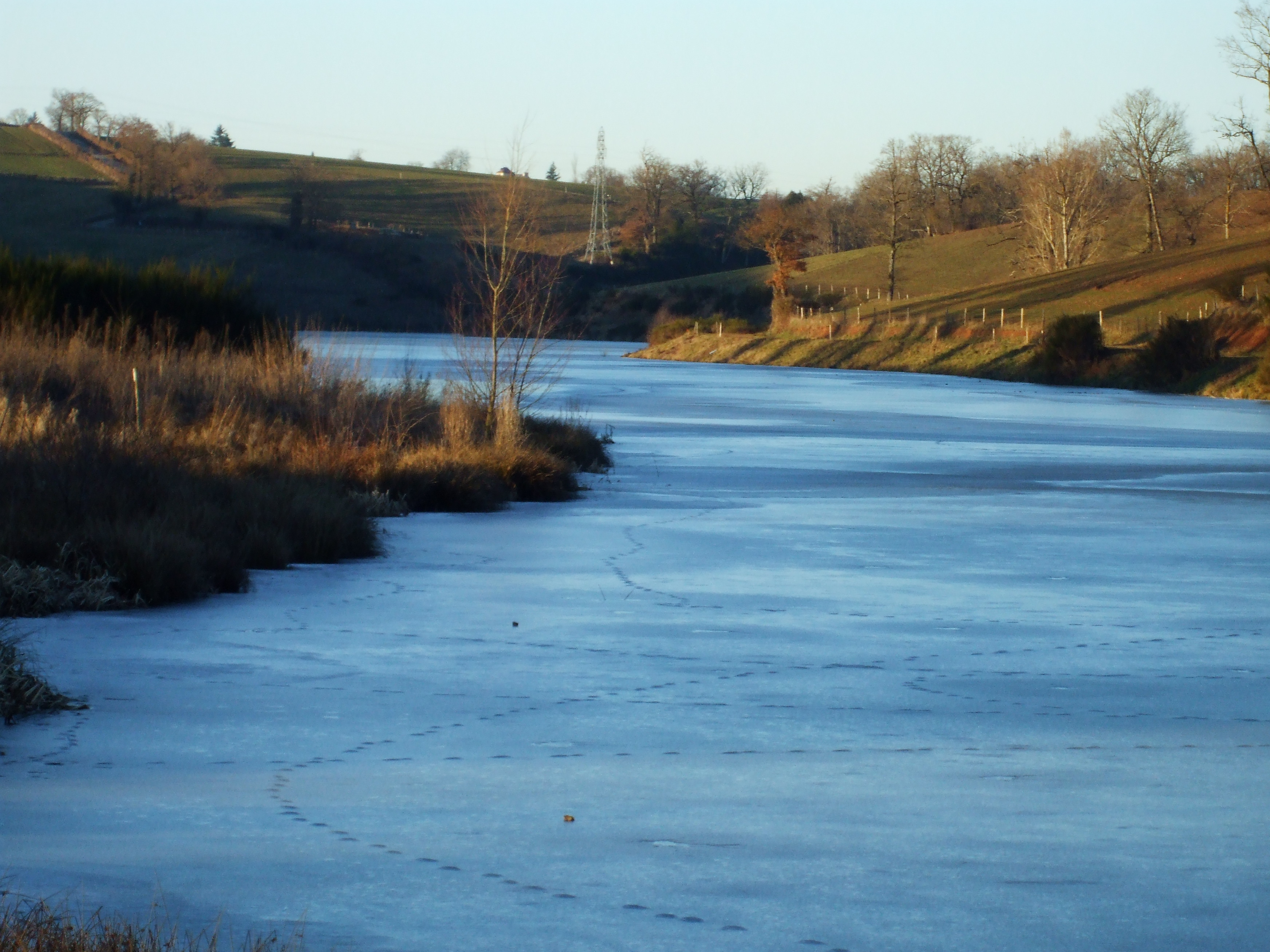

- Location within France
- Location: Aveyron
- Coordinates: 44.303831°N 2.541639°E
- Type: artificial
- Basin countries: France
- Surface area: 0.105 km^{2} (0.041 sq mi)
- Surface elevation: 640 m (2,100 ft)

Étang de la Brienne (or Lac de Planèzes) is a lake of Luc-la-Primaube in Aveyron, France. At an elevation of 640 m, its surface area is 0.105 km^{2}.
