= Lac des Bez =

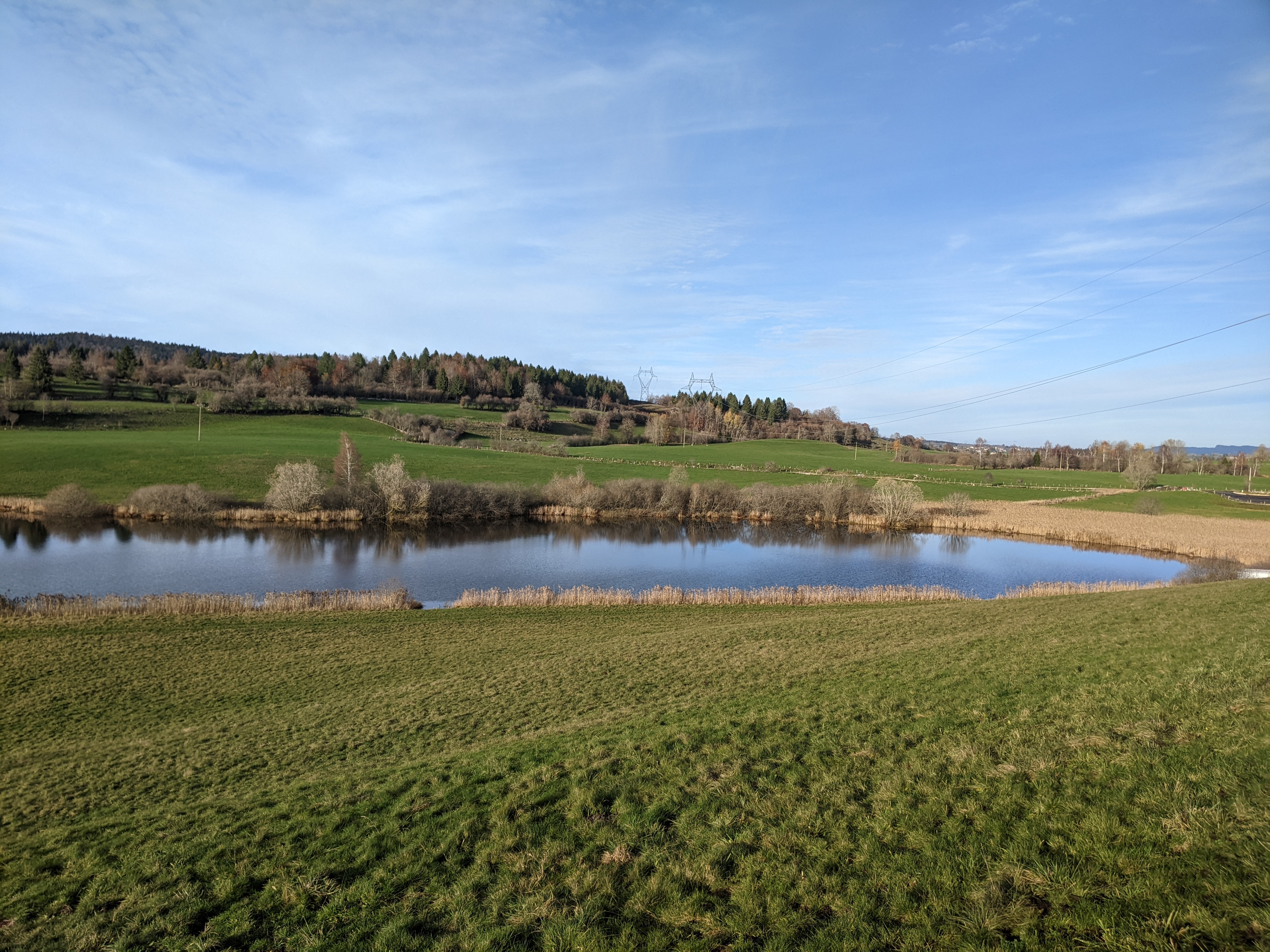

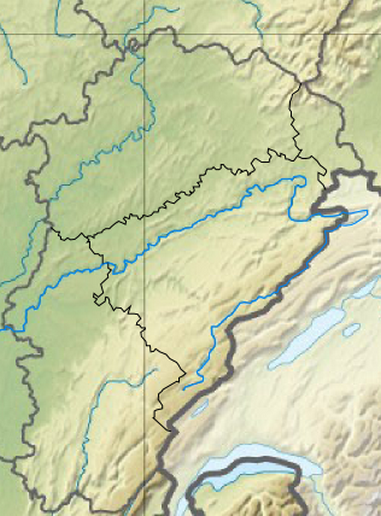
- Location within Franche-Comté
- Location: Grande-Rivière Jura department, Franche-Comté
- Coordinates: 46°31′30″N 5°53′21″E
- Type: Natural freshwater lake
- Basin countries: France
- Max. length: 290 m (950 ft)
- Max. width: 95 m (312 ft)

Lac des Bez is a lake at Grande-Rivière in the Jura department of France.
