= Lac d'Estaing =

Lake in Hautes-Pyrénées, France

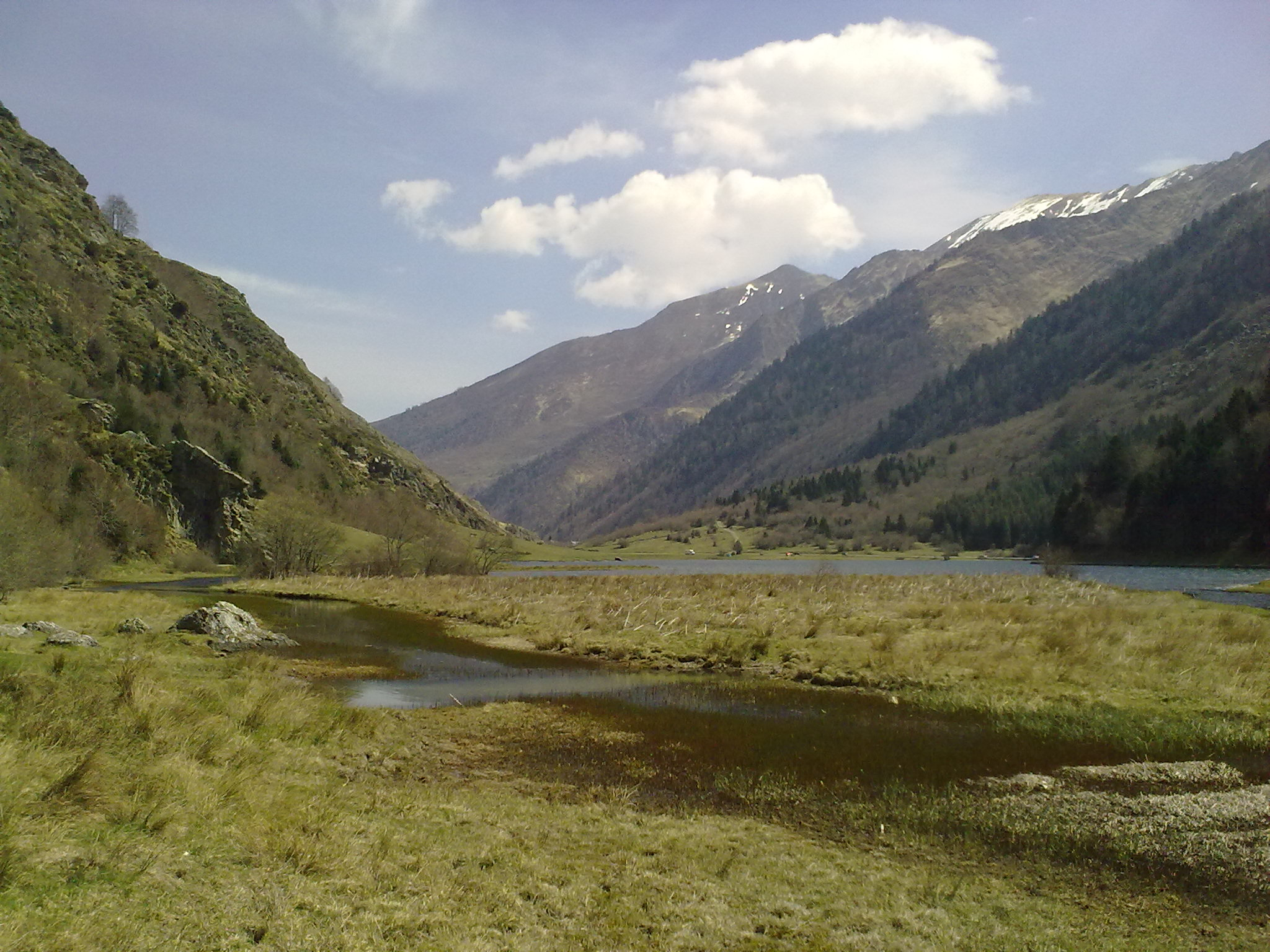

- Location within Pyrenees
- Location: Hautes-Pyrénées
- Coordinates: 42°54′25″N 00°12′29″W
- Basin countries: France
- Surface area: 0.086 km^{2} (0.033 sq mi)
- Max. depth: 130 m (430 ft)
- Surface elevation: 1,163 m (3,816 ft)

Lac d'Estaing is a lake in Hautes-Pyrénées, France. At an elevation of 1163 m, its surface area is 0.086 km^{2.}

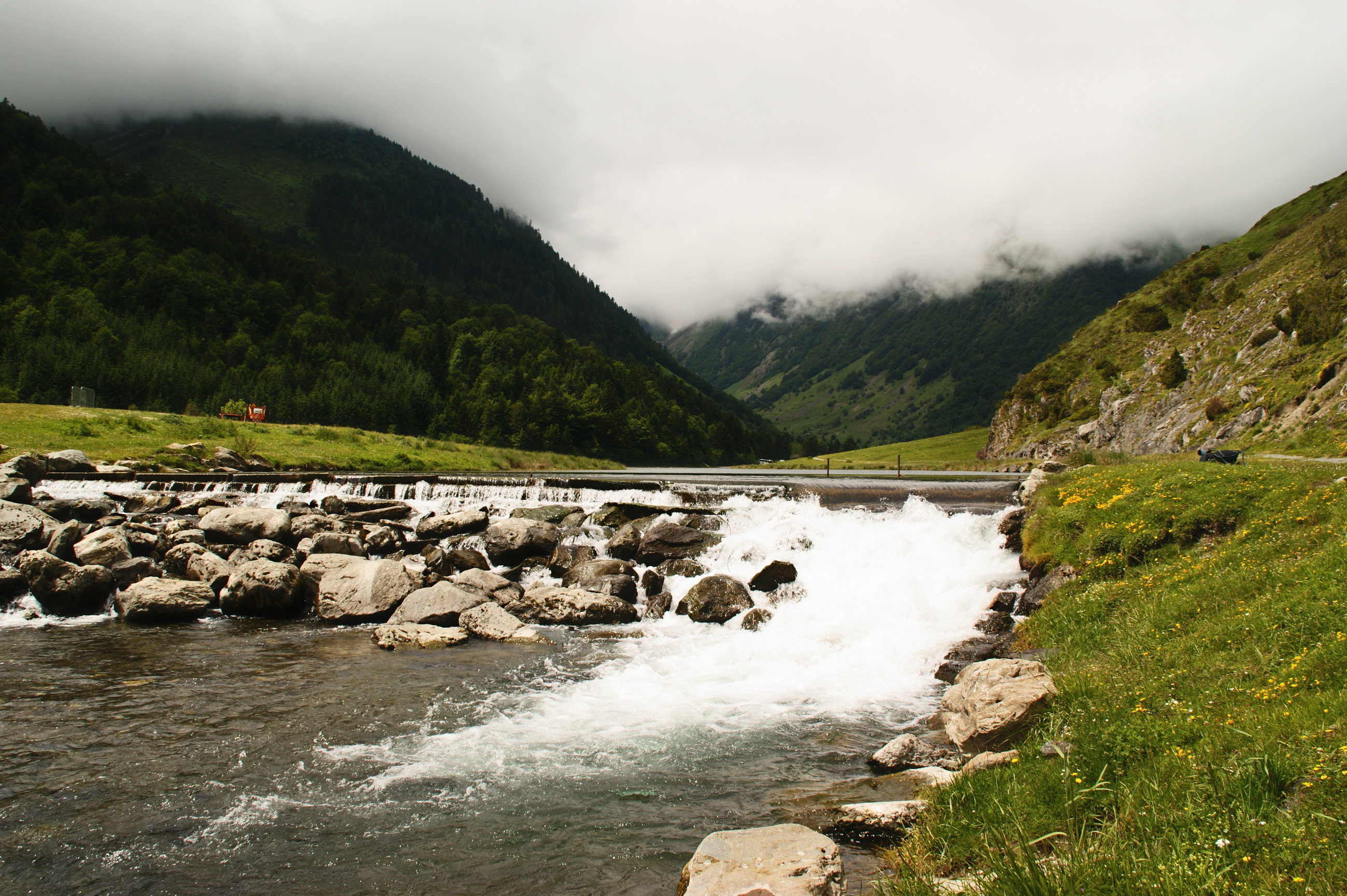
Outfall from the Lac d'Estaing

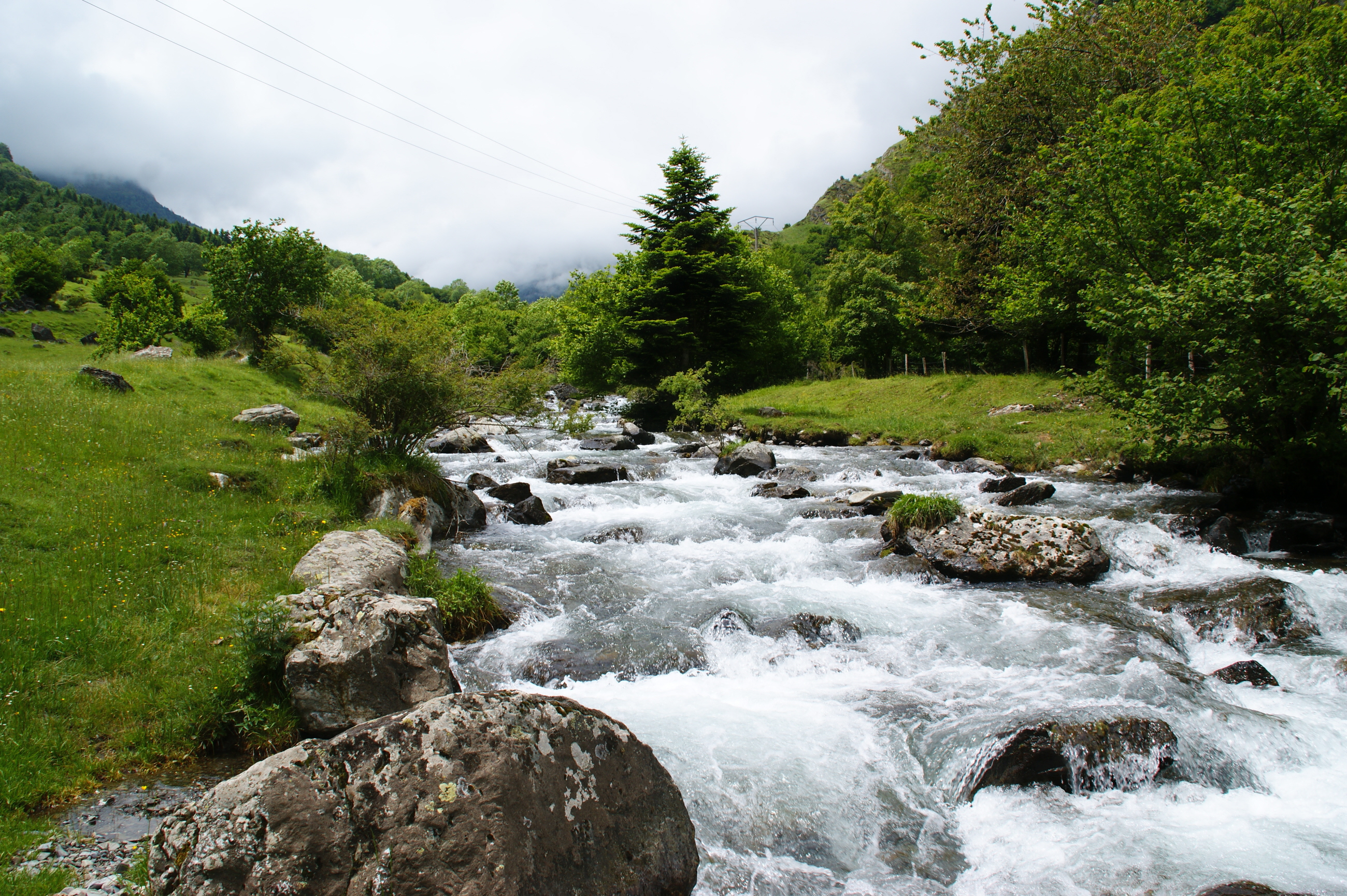
Gave de Labat de Bun (river) just below the Lac d'Estaing
