= Étang Long =

Lake in France

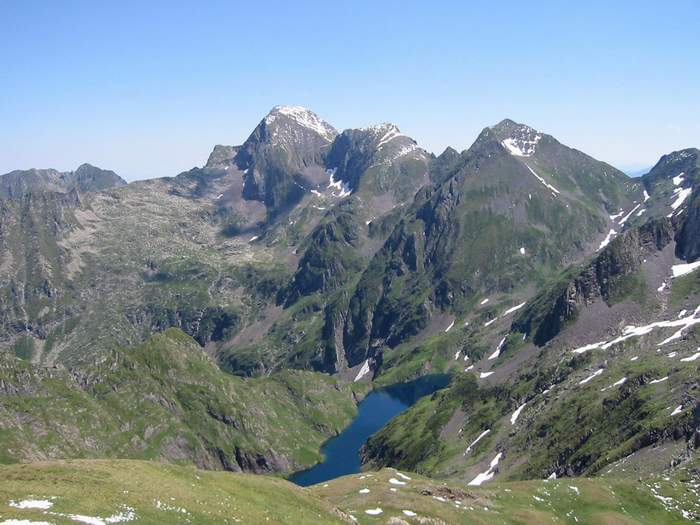

- Location within France
- Location: Ariège
- Coordinates: 42°48′N 1°04′E
- Basin countries: France
- Surface elevation: 2,125 m (6,972 ft)

Étang Long is a lake in Ariège, France.
