= Lac de Viry =

Lake in France

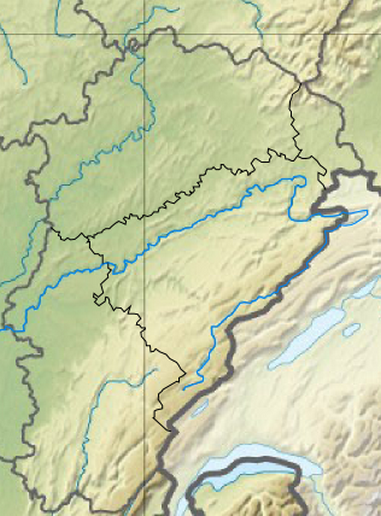
- Location within Franche-Comté
- Location: Viry, Jura department, Franche-Comté
- Coordinates: 46°16′40″N 5°43′21″E
- Basin countries: France

Lac de Viry is a lake at Viry in the Jura department of France.
