= Lac d'Alfeld =

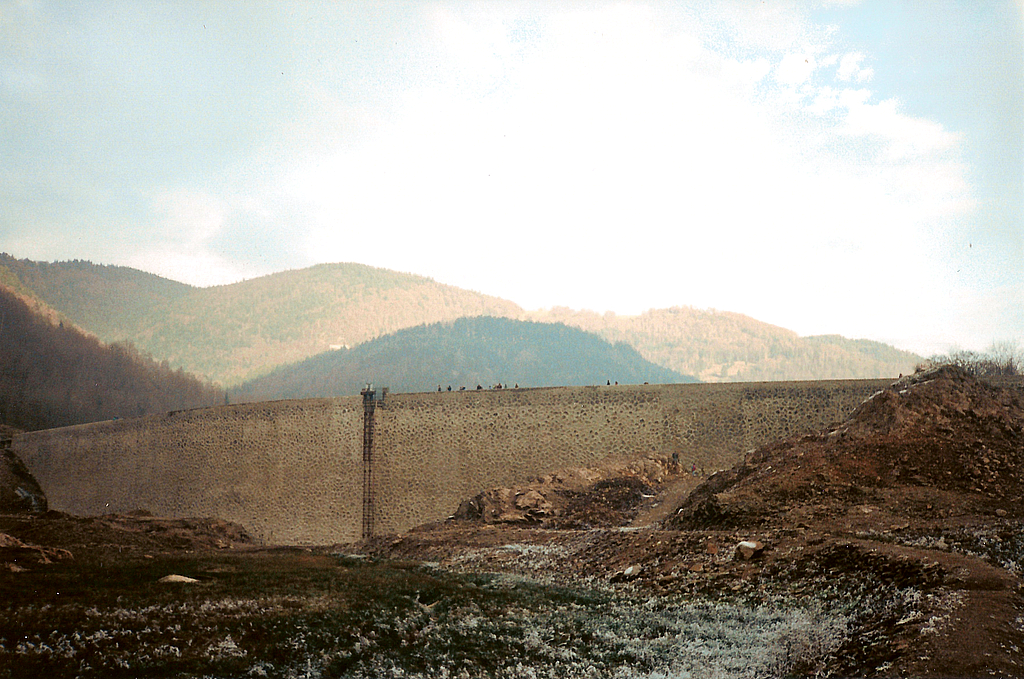

- Location within France
- Location: Haut-Rhin
- Coordinates: 47.817016°N 6.873236°E
- Type: reservoir
- Primary outflows: Alfeld
- Basin countries: France
- Surface area: 0.1 km^{2} (0.039 sq mi)
- Max. depth: 22.1 m (73 ft)
- Water volume: 1,020,000 m^{3} (36,000,000 cu ft)
- Surface elevation: 620 m (2,030 ft)

Lac d'Alfeld is a lake in Haut-Rhin, France. At an elevation of 620 m, its surface area is 0.1 km^{2}.
