= Estany de la Pradella =

Lake in France

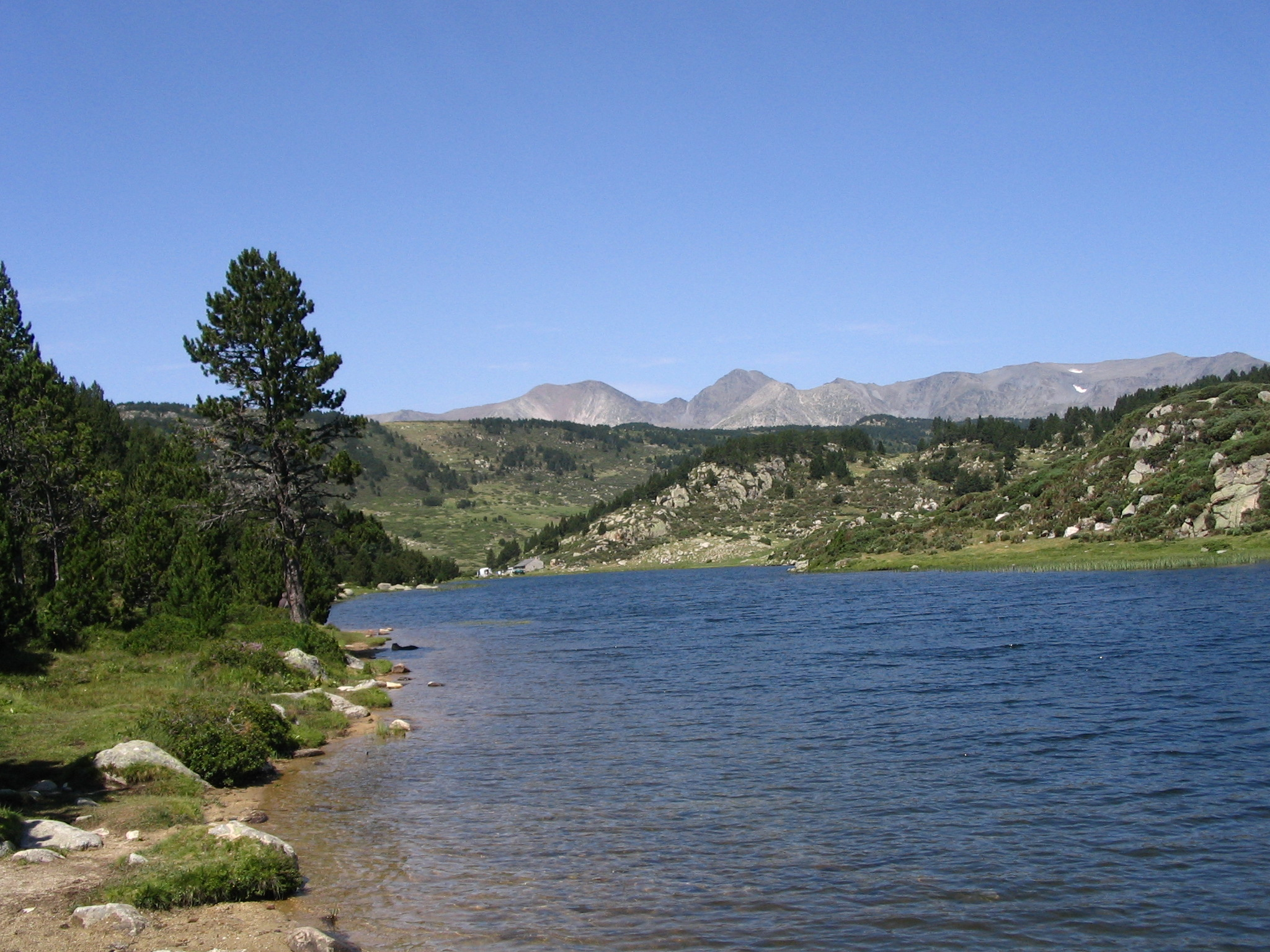

- Location within Pyrenees
- Location: Pyrénées-Orientales, Pyrénées
- Coordinates: 42.546005°N 2.012944°E
- Basin countries: France
- Surface area: 11.2 ha (28 acres)
- Max. depth: 16 m (52 ft)
- Surface elevation: 1,954 m (6,411 ft)

Estany de la Pradella is a lake in Pyrénées-Orientales, Pyrénées, France. At an elevation of 1950 m, its surface area is 0.1 km².
