= Estany de la Balmeta =

Lake in Pyrénées-Orientales, France

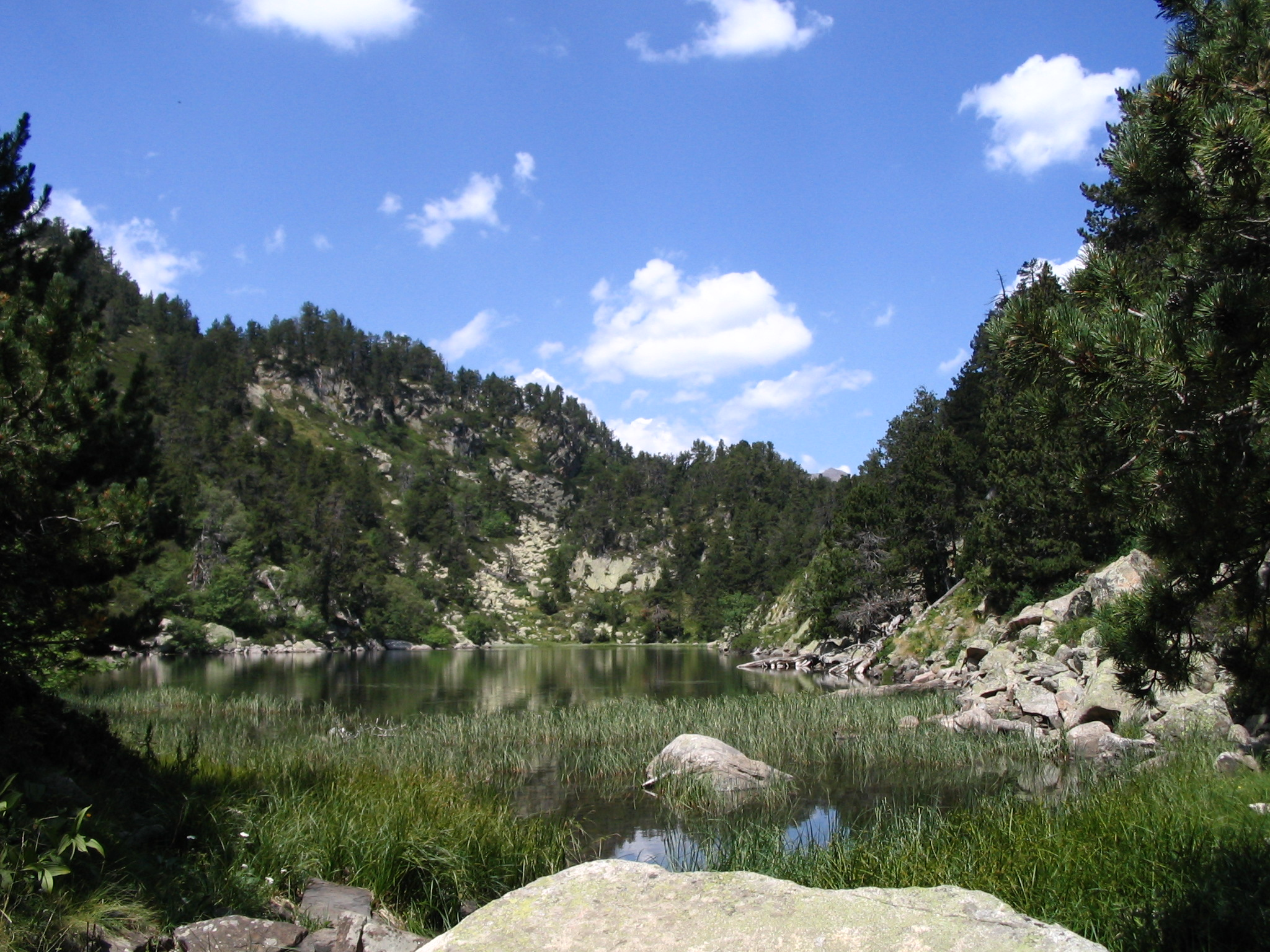

- Location within Pyrenees
- Location: Pyrénées-Orientales
- Coordinates: 42.58801°N 2.02157°E
- Basin countries: France
- Surface area: 0.012 km^{2} (0.0046 sq mi)
- Surface elevation: 2,047 m (6,716 ft)

Estany de la Balmeta is a lake in Pyrénées-Orientales, France. At an elevation of 2,047 metres (6,716 ft), its surface area is 0.012 square kilometres (0.0046 sq mi).
