= Lac d'Aygue Rouye =

Lake in France

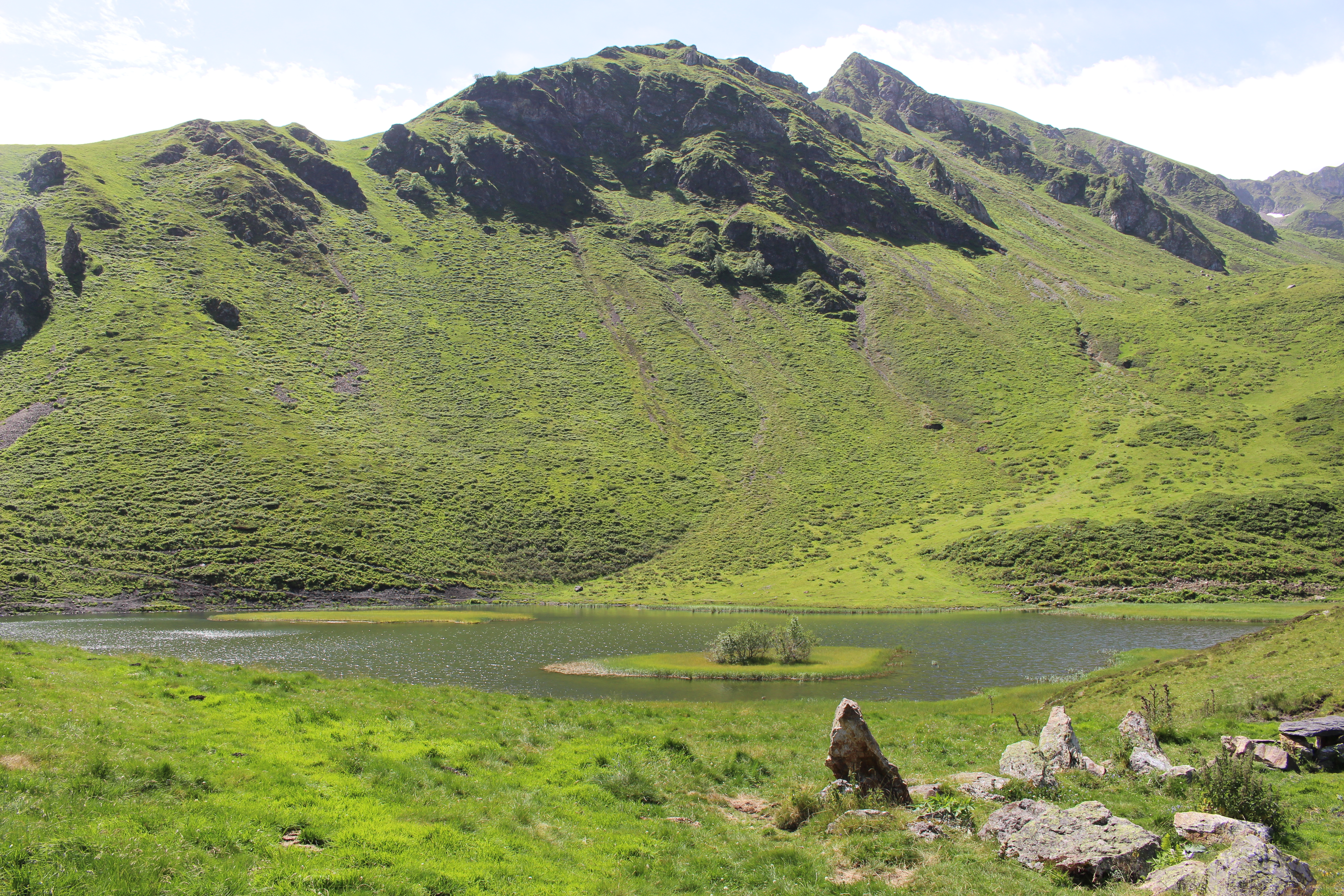
- The Lake in view.

- Location within France
- Location: Hautes-Pyrénées
- Coordinates: 42.9660°N 0.1755°E
- Basin countries: France
- Surface area: 0.01 km^{2} (0.0039 sq mi)
- Surface elevation: 1,595 m (5,233 ft)

Lac d'Aygue Rouye is a lake in Hautes-Pyrénées, France. At an elevation of 1595 m, its surface area is 0.01 km^{2}.
