= Lac de Barroude =

Lakes in Hautes-Pyrénées, Occitania, France

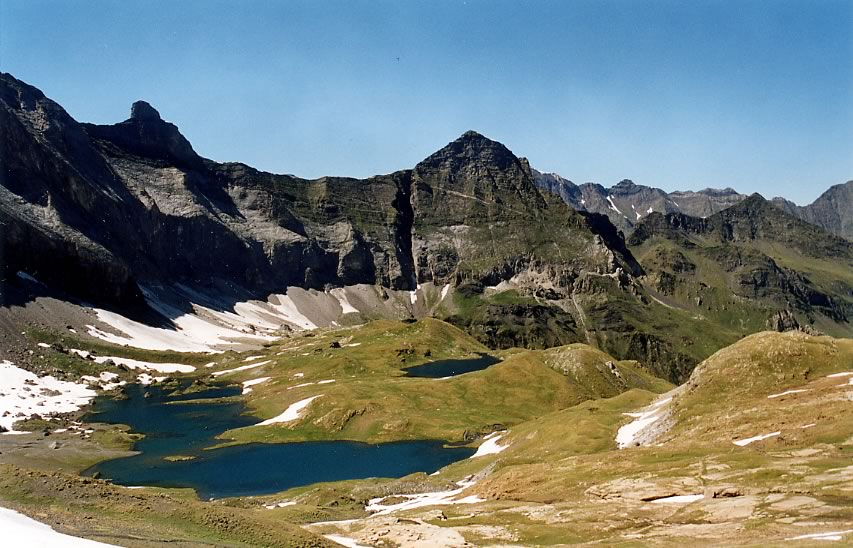
- A Mountain Region Lake

- Location within France
- Location: Hautes-Pyrénées
- Coordinates: 42°43′52″N 0°8′43″E
- Basin countries: France
- Surface area: 0.094 km^{2} (0.036 sq mi)
- Max. depth: 9 m (30 ft)
- Surface elevation: 2,355 m (7,726 ft)

Lacs de Barroude are two lakes in Hautes-Pyrénées, France. At an elevation of 2,355 m, the surface area of the largest is 0.094 km^{2}.
