= Lac du Barbat =

Lake in Hautes-Pyrénées, Occitania, France

- Location within France
- Location: Hautes-Pyrénées
- Coordinates: 42°52′42″N 00°12′4″W
- Primary outflows: Arriousec
- Basin countries: France
- Surface elevation: 1,973 m (6,473 ft)

Lac du Barbat is a lake in Hautes-Pyrénées, France.
