= Lac de Migouélou =

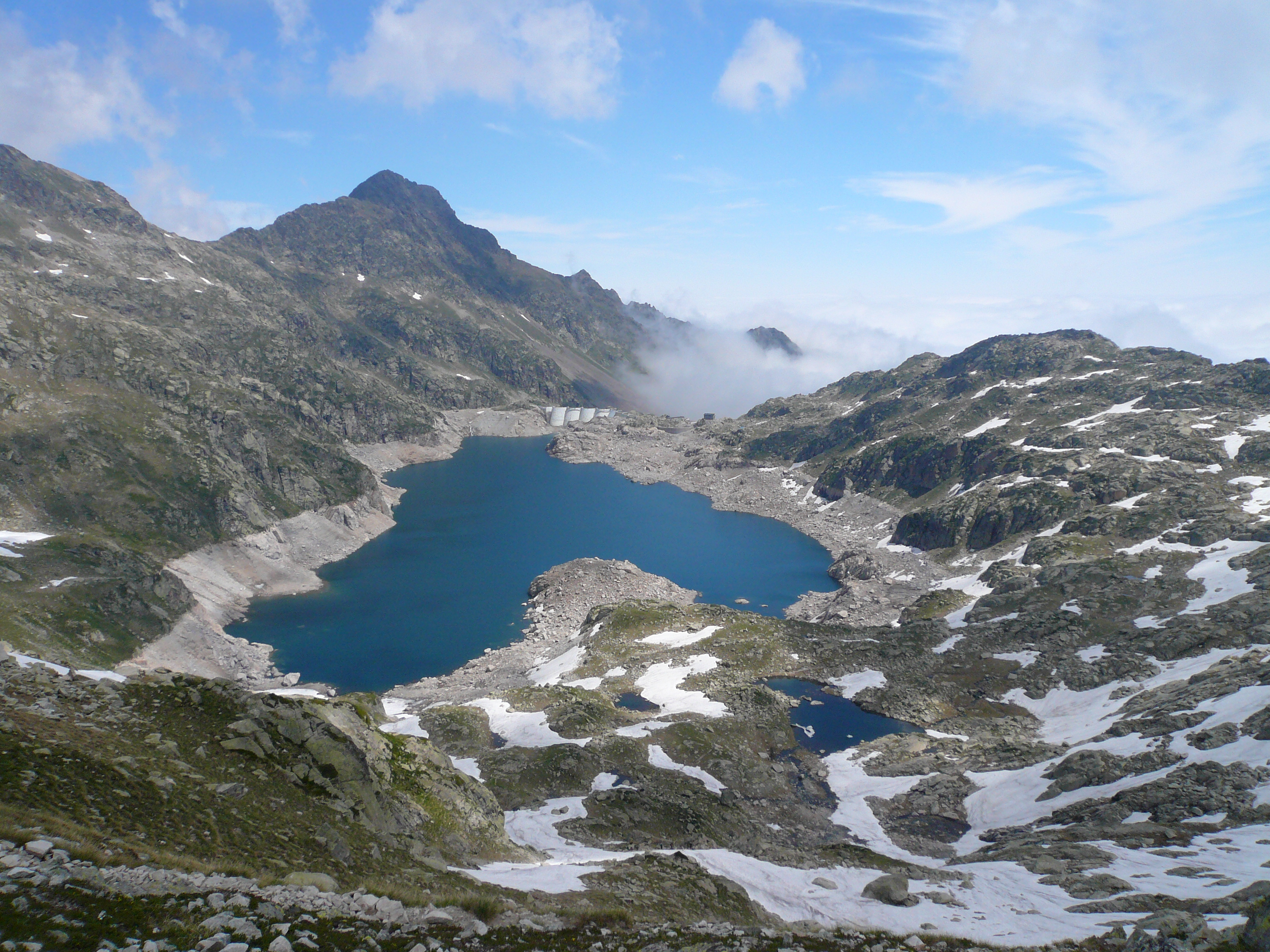

- Location within Pyrenees
- Location: Hautes-Pyrénées
- Coordinates: 42.885°N 0.303°W
- Type: reservoir, natural lake
- Primary outflows: Arriougrand
- Basin countries: France
- Surface area: 0.48 km^{2} (0.19 sq mi)
- Max. depth: 60 m (200 ft)
- Surface elevation: 2,278 m (7,474 ft)

Lac de Migouélou is a lake in Hautes-Pyrénées, France. At an elevation of 2278 m, its surface area is 0.48 km².
