= Lac du Jotty =

- Location within France
- Location: La Baume, Haute-Savoie
- Coordinates: 46.295556°N 6.616667°E
- Type: reservoir
- Primary inflows: Dranse de Morzine
- Primary outflows: Dranse de Morzine
- Basin countries: France
- Surface area: 18 ha (44 acres)
- Surface elevation: 645 m (2,116 ft)

Lac du Jotty is a reservoir at La Baume in Haute-Savoie, France.
