= Lac d'Arrious =

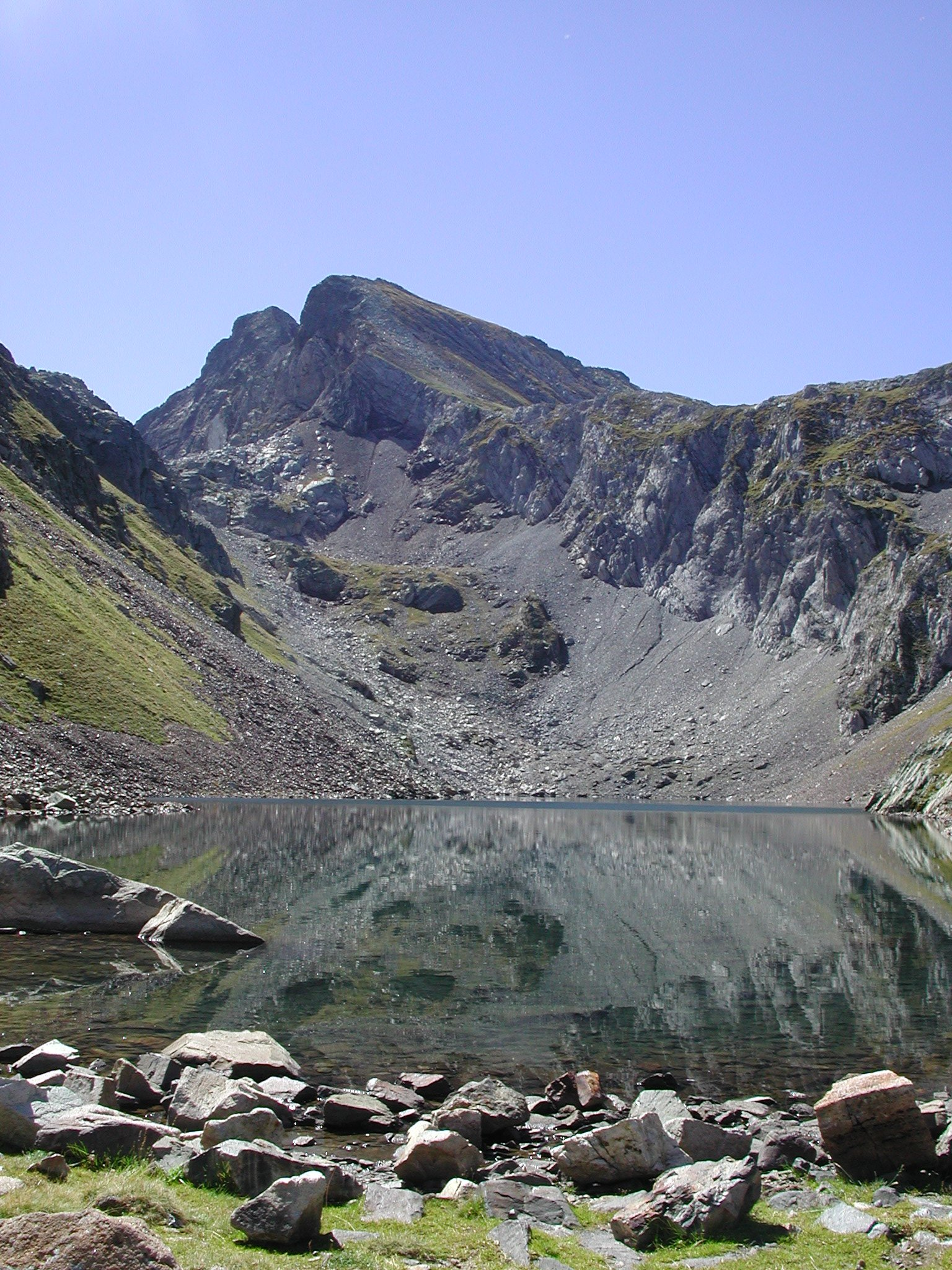

- Location within France
- Location: Pyrénées-Atlantiques
- Coordinates: 42.845016°N 0.339932°W
- Type: Natural freshwater lake
- Primary outflows: Arrious
- Basin countries: France
- Max. length: 410 m (1,350 ft)
- Max. width: 95 m (312 ft)
- Surface area: 0.025 km^{2} (0.0097 sq mi)
- Surface elevation: 2,285 m (7,497 ft)
- Islands: several islets near southern shore

Lac d'Arrious is a lake in Pyrénées-Atlantiques, France. At an elevation of 2285 m, its surface area is 0.025 km².

== Geography ==
Lake d'Arrious is a natural inland body of water, fed by snowmelt and glacial melt. It lies at an altitude of 2,285 meters. It is part of the Pyrenees National Park. Its overflow feeds the Arrious stream, which flows into the Gave de Brousset river.
