= Lac de Suyen =

Lake in Hautes-Pyrénées, France

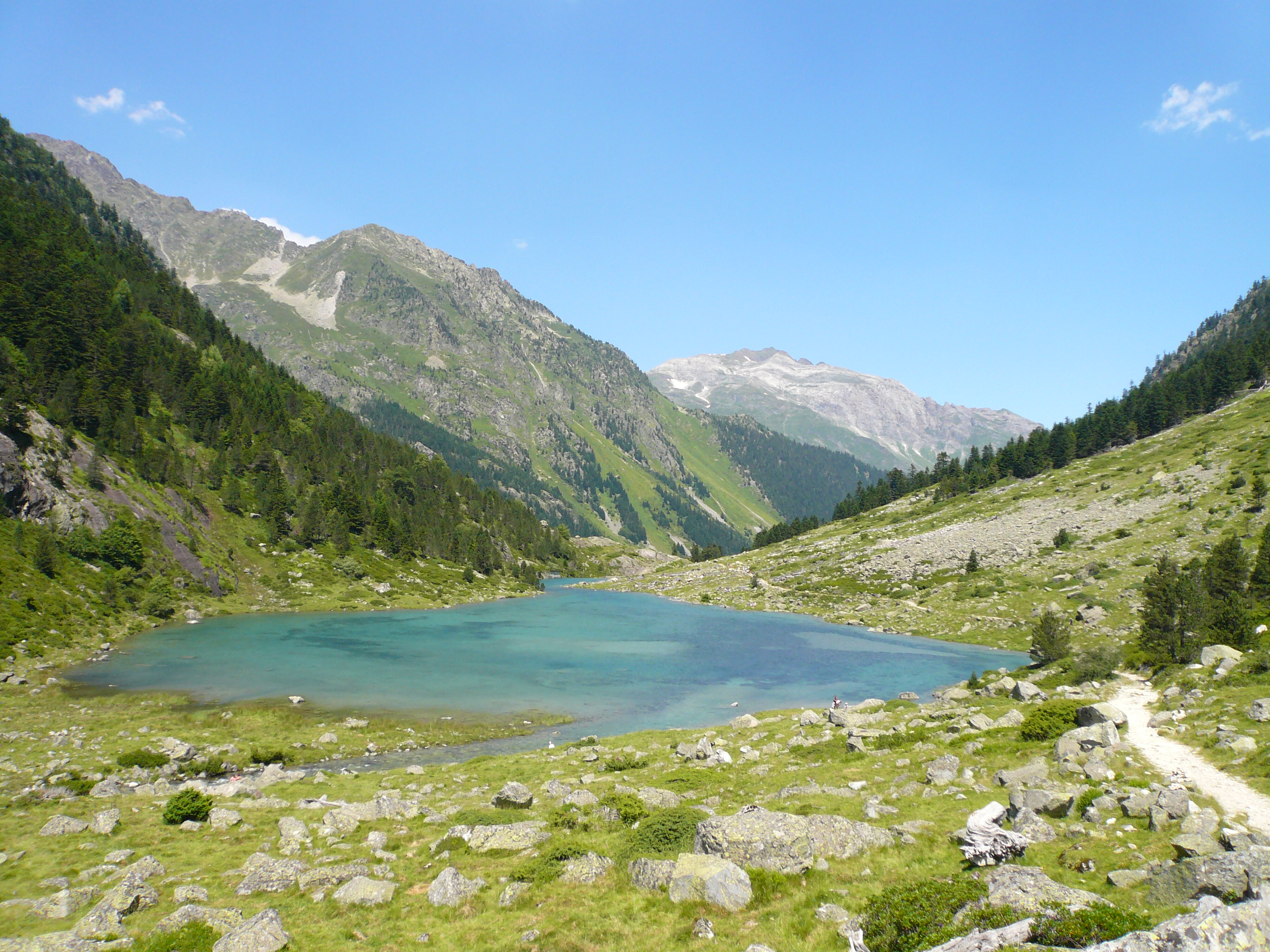

- Location within Pyrenees
- Location: Hautes-Pyrénées
- Coordinates: 42.876°N 0.267°W
- Primary outflows: gave d'Arrens
- Basin countries: France
- Surface area: 0.02 km^{2} (0.0077 sq mi)
- Max. depth: 3 m (9.8 ft)
- Surface elevation: 1,536 m (5,039 ft)

Lac de Suyen is a lake in Hautes-Pyrénées, France. At an elevation of 1536 m, its surface area is 0.02 km².
