= Lacs d'Arrémoulit =

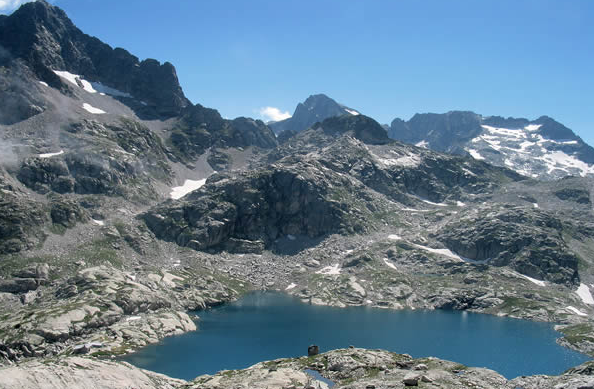

- Location within France
- Location: Pyrénées-Atlantiques
- Coordinates: 42.845922°N 0.329161°W
- Type: reservoir
- Basin countries: France
- Surface area: 0.11 km^{2} (0.042 sq mi)
- Max. depth: 60 m (200 ft)
- Surface elevation: 2,265 m (7,431 ft)

The Lacs d'Arrémoulit is a group of lakes in Pyrénées-Atlantiques, France. At an elevation of 2,265 m (7,431 ft), their surface area is 0.11 km^{2} (0 sq mi).
