= Réservoir Saint-Michel =

Lake in France

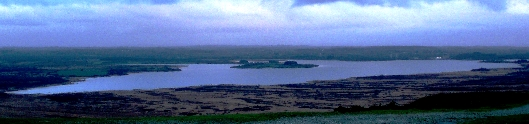

- Location within Finistère
- Location: Finistère
- Coordinates: 48.35°N 3.90°W
- Type: artificial
- Primary inflows: Ellez, Roudouhir, Stêr-Red
- Catchment area: 33 km^{2} (13 sq mi)
- Basin countries: France
- Max. length: 4.25 km (2.64 mi)
- Max. width: 0.8 km (0.50 mi)
- Surface area: 4.5 km^{2} (1.7 sq mi)
- Max. depth: 7 m (23 ft)
- Surface elevation: 227 m (745 ft)

Réservoir Saint-Michel (Breton: Poull-dour Sant Mikael) is a lake in Finistère, France. At an elevation of 227 m, its surface area is 4.5 km^{2}.
