= Lac de Michelbach =

Lake in France

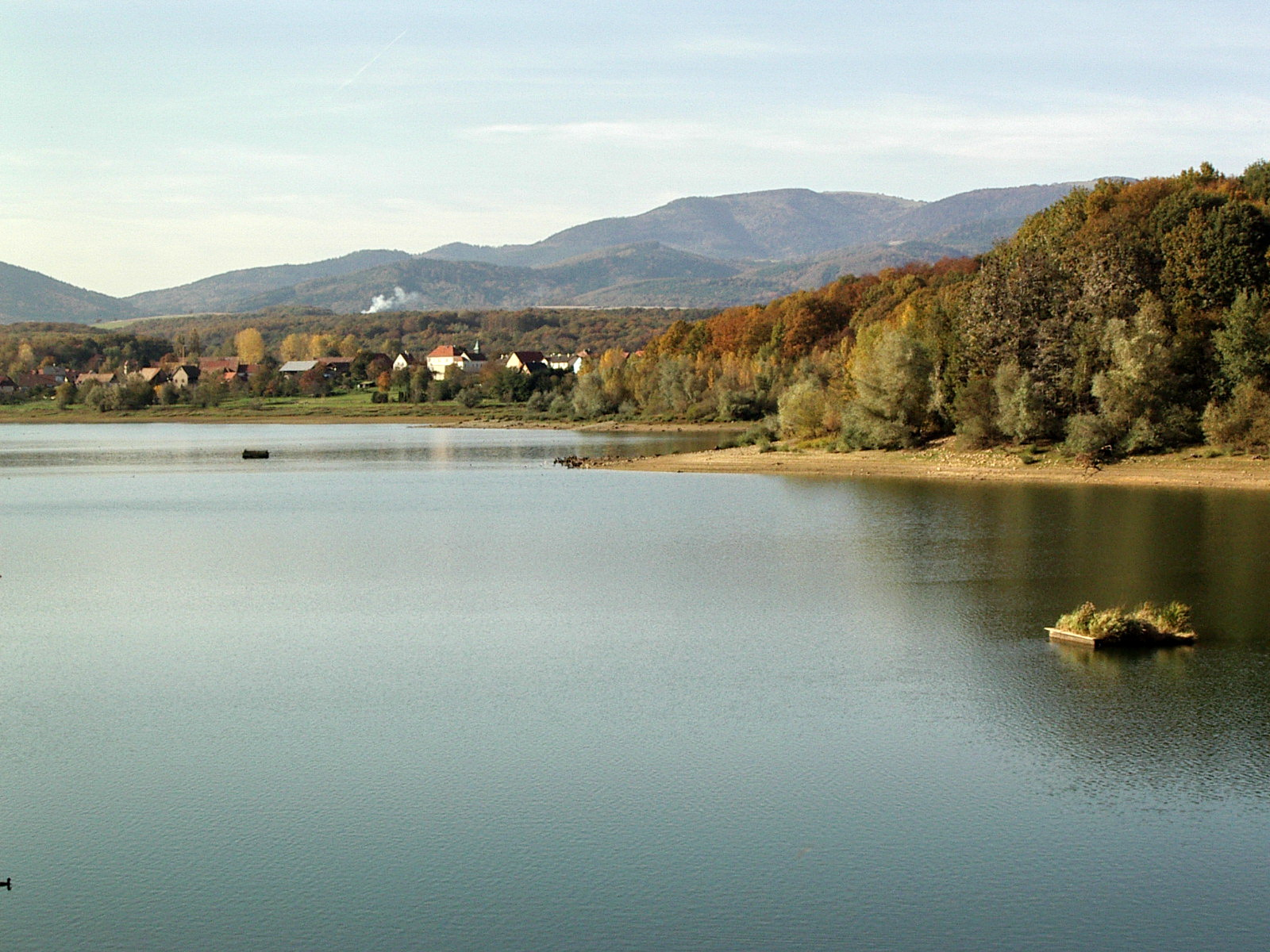

- Location within France
- Location: Michelbach, Haut-Rhin
- Coordinates: 47°45′26″N 7°07′26″E
- Type: artificial
- Primary inflows: Doller
- Basin countries: France
- Surface area: 0.81 km^{2} (0.31 sq mi)
- Max. depth: 20 m (66 ft)
- Surface elevation: 335 m (1,099 ft)

Lac de Michelbach is a lake in Michelbach, Haut-Rhin, France. The reservoir serves as water supply for the city of Mulhouse. Located at an elevation of 335 m (1,099 ft), its surface area is 0.81 km^{2} (0.31 sq mi).
