= Lac Fourchu =

Lake in Isère, France

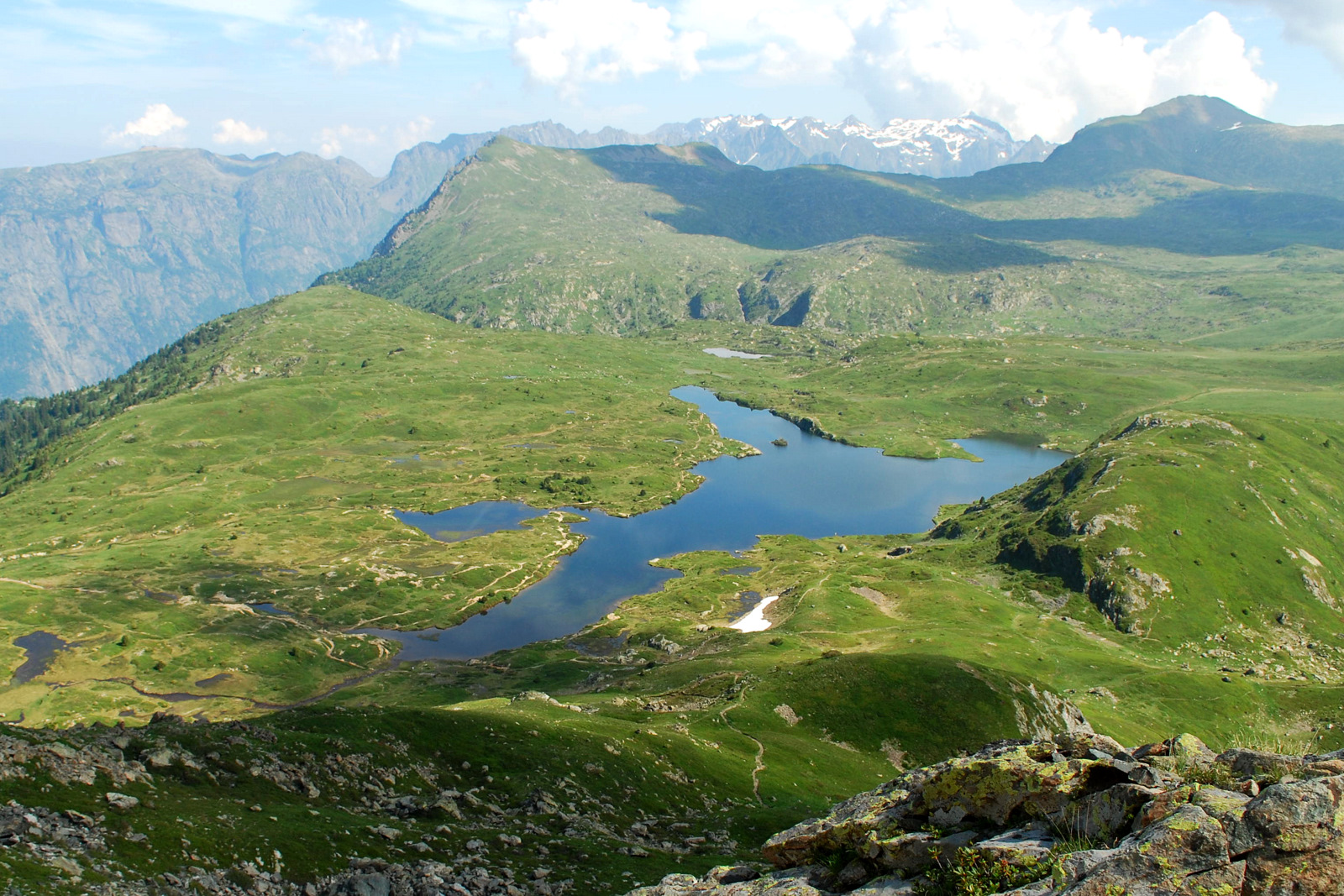
- Lac Fourchu from the Taillefer ascent

- Location within France
- Location: Isère
- Coordinates: 45°3′22″N 5°55′46″E
- Primary inflows: precipitation
- Basin countries: France
- Surface elevation: 2,050 m (6,730 ft)
- Islands: 1

Lac Fourchu is a lake in Isère, France.
