= Lac Bersau =

Lake in France

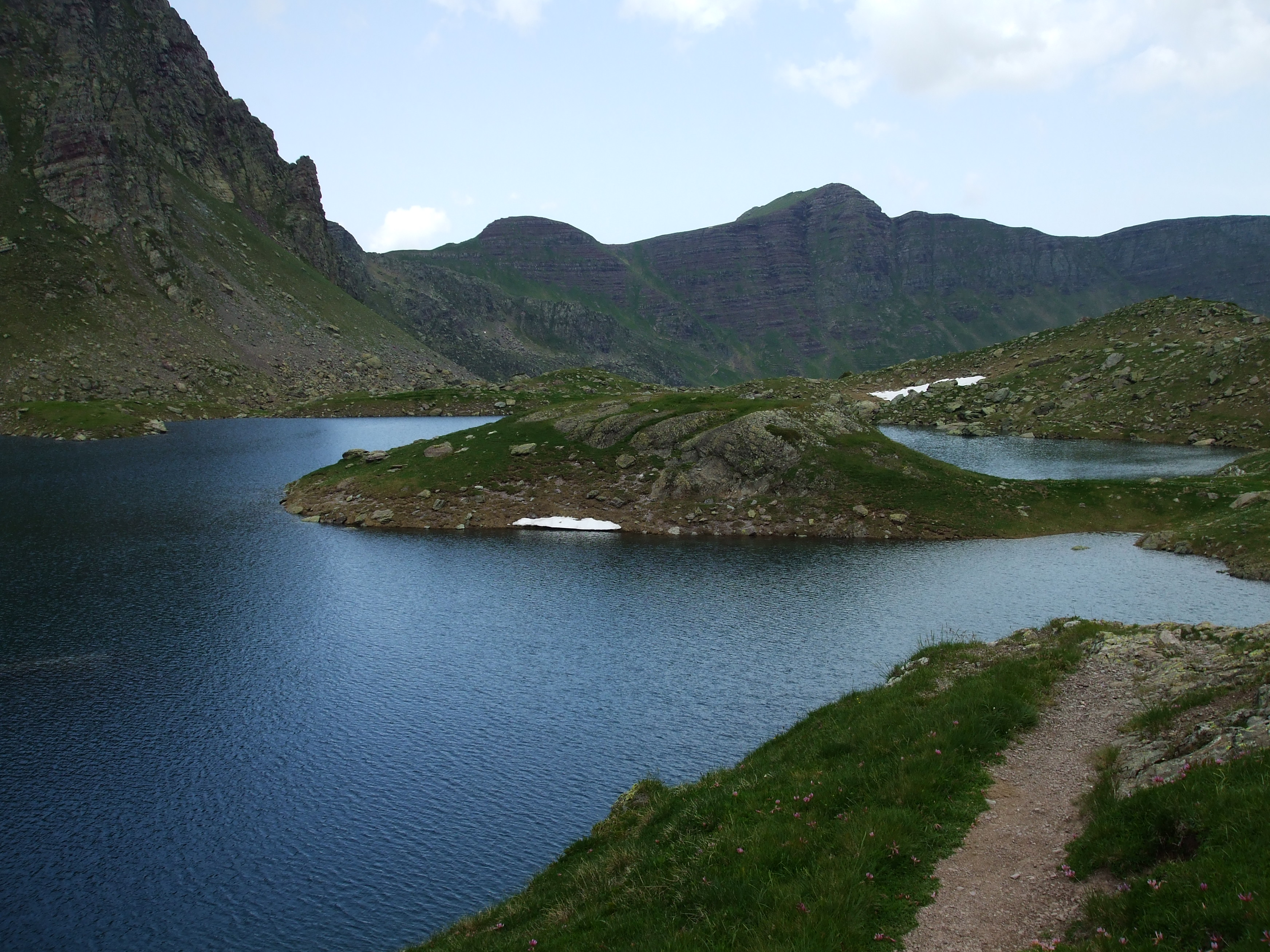

- Location within Pyrenees
- Location: Pyrénées, Pyrénées-Atlantiques
- Group: Lacs d'Ayous
- Coordinates: 42°50′21″N 0°29′41″W
- Basin countries: France
- Surface area: 0.125 km^{2} (0.048 sq mi)
- Max. depth: 30 m (98 ft)
- Surface elevation: 2,083 m (6,834 ft)

Lac Bersau is a lake in the Pyrénées, department Pyrénées-Atlantiques, France. At an elevation of 2083 m, its surface area is 0.125 km^{2}, its max depth is 30 m or (98.42) foot
