= Lac de Batbielh =

Lake in Hautes-Pyrénées, Occitania, France

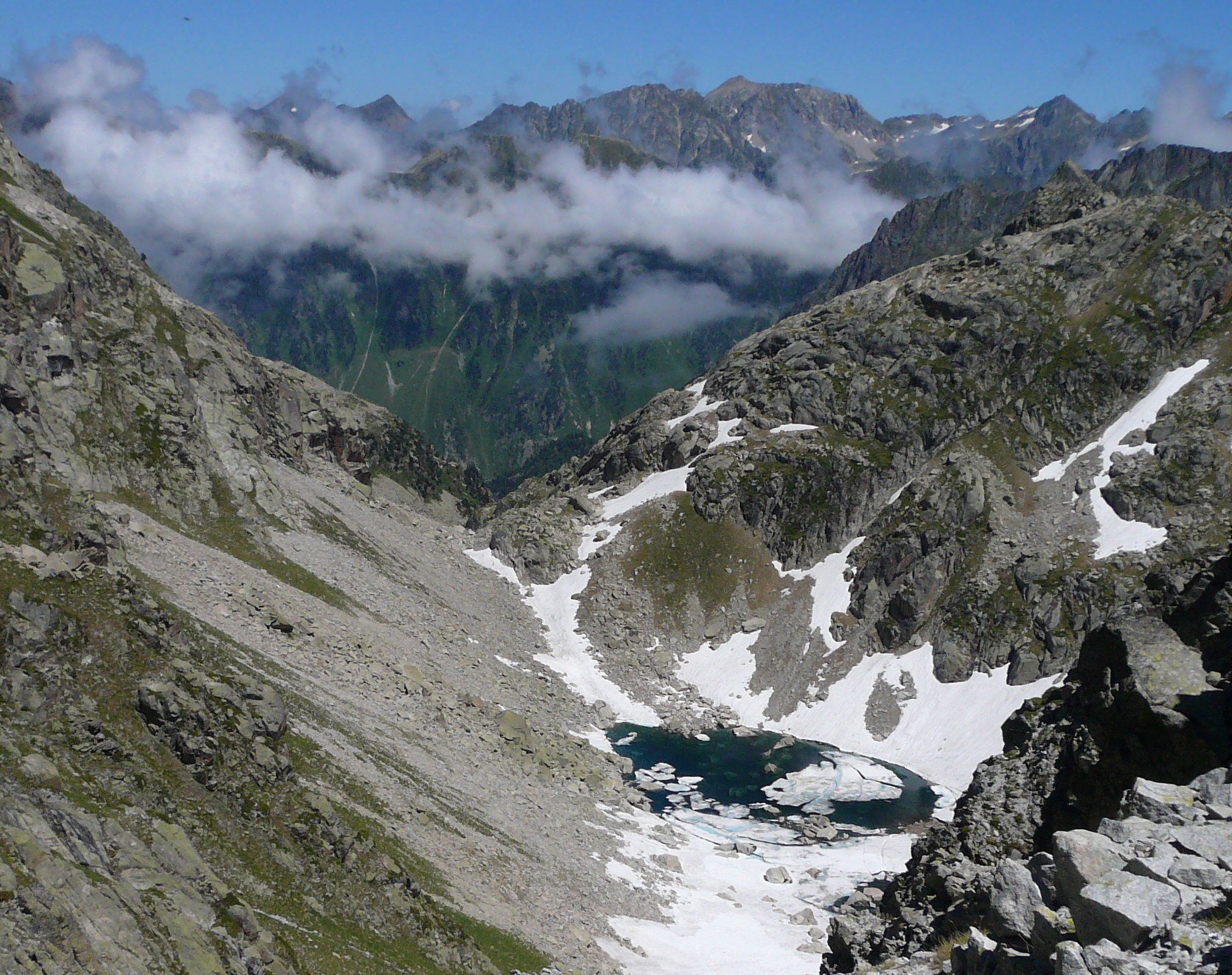

- Location within France
- Location: Hautes-Pyrénées
- Coordinates: 42.864°N 0.303°W
- Basin countries: France
- Surface area: 0.01 km^{2} (0.0039 sq mi)
- Surface elevation: 2,229 m (7,313 ft)

Lac de Batbielh is a very small lake in Hautes-Pyrénées, France, located approximately 2 km north of the French–Spanish border within the Pyrénées National Park. At an elevation of 2229 m, its surface area is 0.01 km^{2}.
