= Lac de Fontaine =

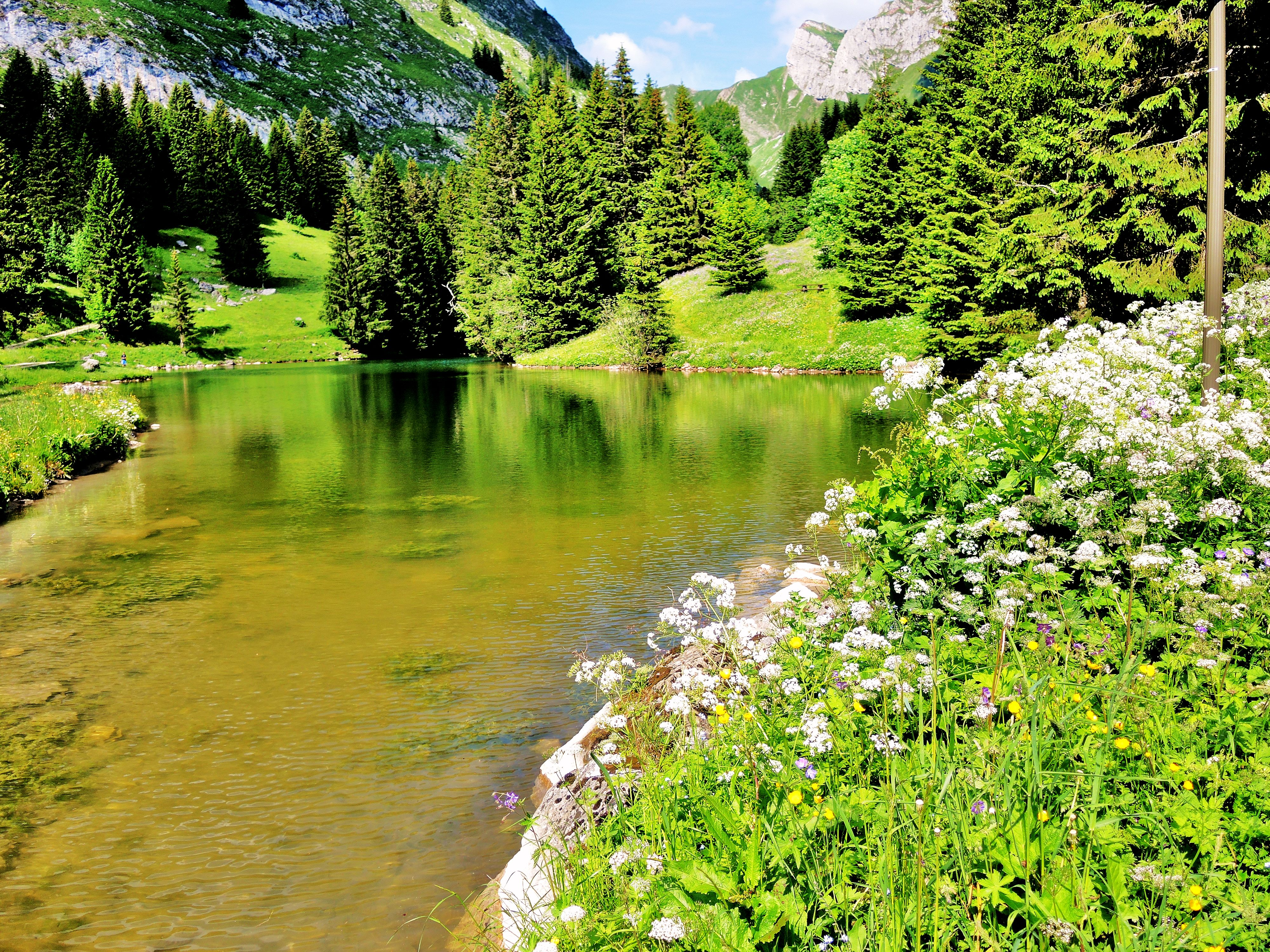

- Location within France
- Location: Vacheresse, Haute-Savoie
- Coordinates: 46.322222°N 6.747222°E
- Basin countries: France

Lac de Fontaine (French pronunciation: [lak də fɔ̃tɛn]) is a lake in Haute-Savoie, France.
