= Lacs de Batboucou =

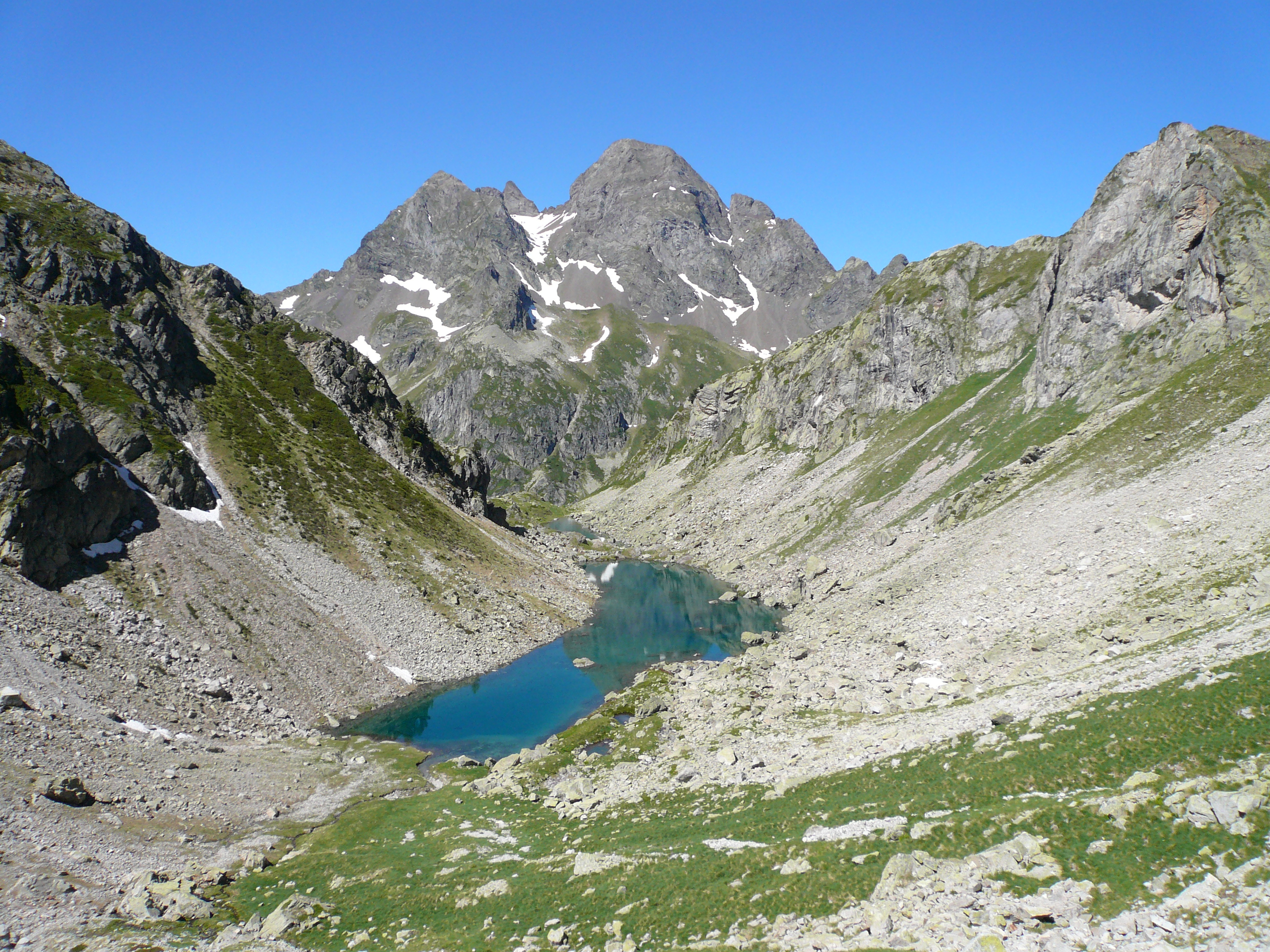

- Location within France
- Location: Pyrénées-Atlantiques
- Coordinates: 42.865°N 0.325°W
- Type: Natural freshwater lakes
- Basin countries: France
- Max. length: North lake 275 m (902 ft) South lake 145 m (476 ft)
- Max. width: North lake 65 m (213 ft) South lake 45 m (148 ft)
- Surface area: 2 ha (4.9 acres)
- Surface elevation: 2,093 and 2,099 m (6,867 and 6,886 ft)
- Islands: Each lake has several islets

Lacs de Batboucou is a group of lakes in Pyrénées-Atlantiques, France. At an elevation of 2,093 and 2,099 m (6,867 and 6,886 ft), its surface area is 2 ha (4.9 acres).
