= Réservoir des Laquets =

Lake in Hautes-Pyrénées, Occitania, France

- Location within Pyrenees
- Location: Pyrénées, Hautes-Pyrénées
- Coordinates: 42.895°N 0.2°E
- Basin countries: France

Réservoir des Laquets is a lake in Pyrénées, Hautes-Pyrénées, France.
