= Lac de Gnioure =

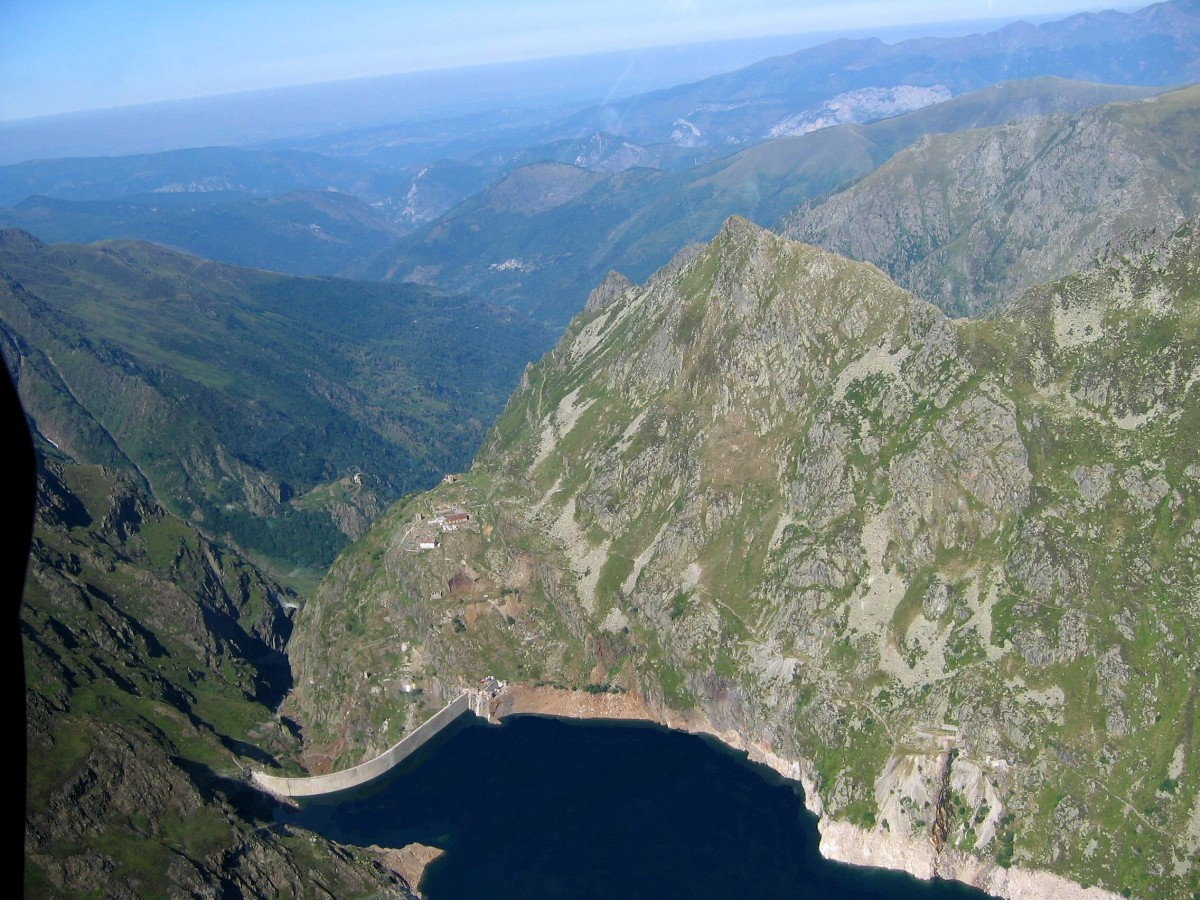

- Location within France
- Location: Ariège
- Coordinates: 42°41′36″N 01°31′47″E
- Type: reservoir
- Catchment area: 18 km^{2} (6.9 sq mi)
- Basin countries: France
- Surface area: 0.86 km^{2} (0.33 sq mi)
- Max. depth: 100 m (330 ft)
- Water volume: 28,400,000 m^{3} (1.00×10^{9} cu ft)
- Surface elevation: 1,831.5 m (6,009 ft)

Lac de Gnioure is a lake in Ariège, France. At an elevation of 1831.5 m, its surface area is 0.86 km^{2}. Construction of the dam began in 1939 and was completed in 1950. The lake is 2.6 miles from the Andorran border.
