= Lac de la Fauge =

Lake in France

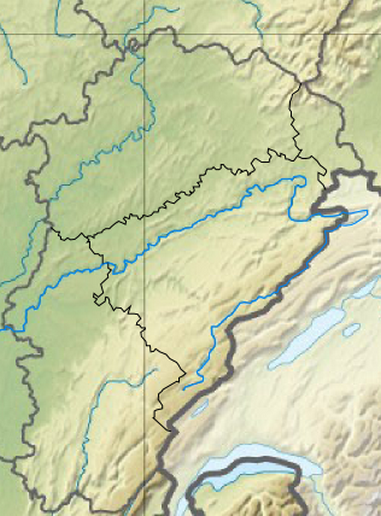
- Location within Franche-Comté
- Location: Étival, Jura department, Franche-Comté
- Coordinates: 46°29′37″N 5°48′29″E
- Basin countries: France

Lac de la Fauge is a lake at Étival in the Jura department of France. With the nearby Lacs d'Etival, it is part of the preserve "Complexe des bois et du lac de l'Assencière" .
