= Lac d'Ilay =

Lake in France

Lac d'Ilay Lac de la Motte
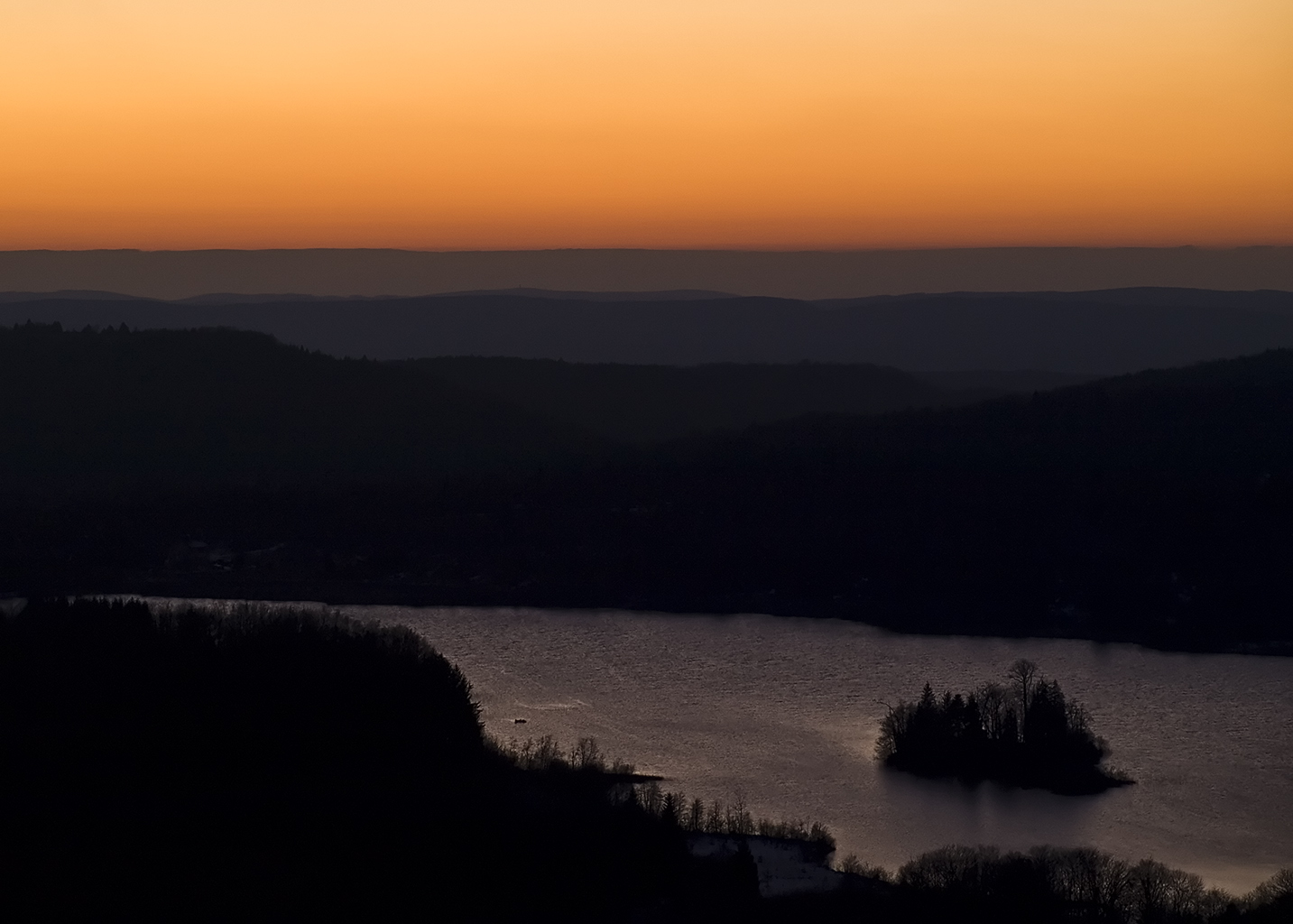

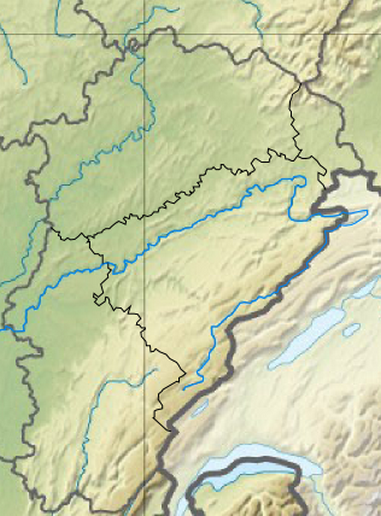
- Location within Franche-Comté
- Location: Jura department, Franche-Comté
- Coordinates: 46°37′34″N 5°53′51″E
- Basin countries: France
- Max. length: 1.9 km (1.2 mi)
- Max. width: 0.4 km (0.25 mi)
- Surface area: 72 ha (180 acres)
- Average depth: 10.3 m (34 ft)
- Max. depth: 32 m (105 ft)
- Surface elevation: 774 m (2,539 ft)
- Islands: 1 (Île de la Motte)

The Lac d'Ilay (or Lac de la Motte) is a lake in the Jura department of France. It has a surface area of 0.72 km² (180 acres). It is located in the communes of Le Frasnois and La Chaux-du-Dombief.

== Gallery ==
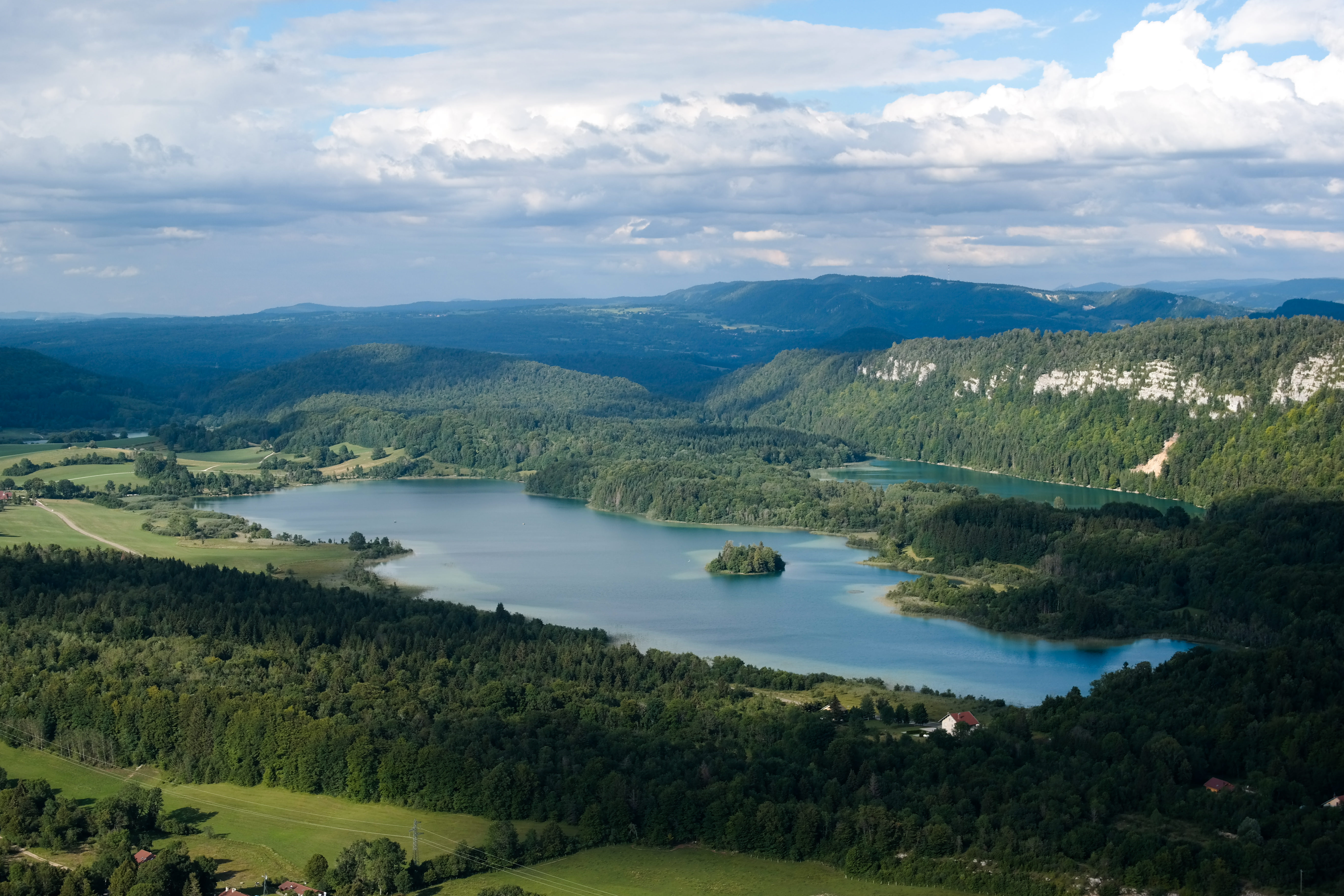
A view of the Lac d'Ilay

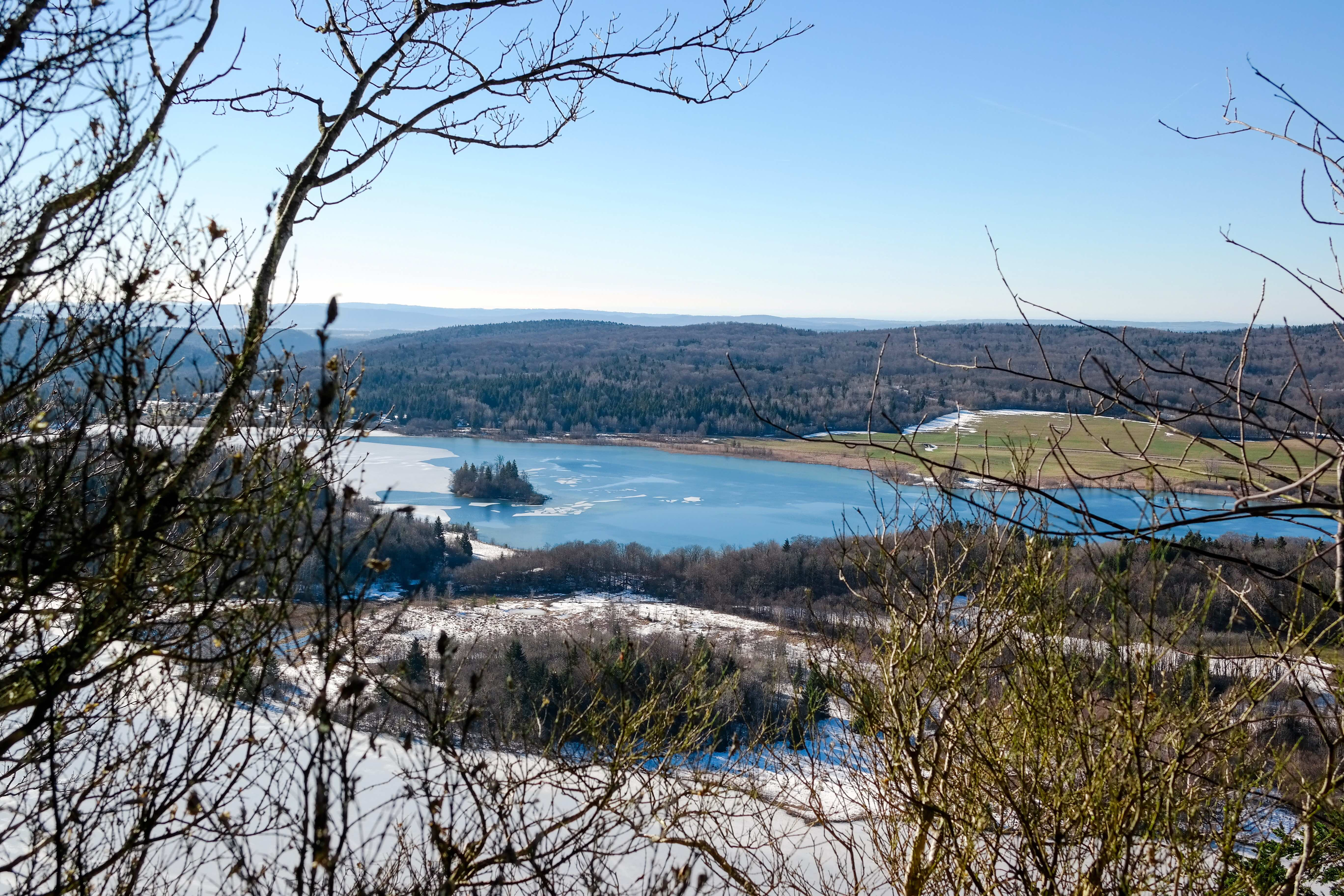
Ilay in the winter

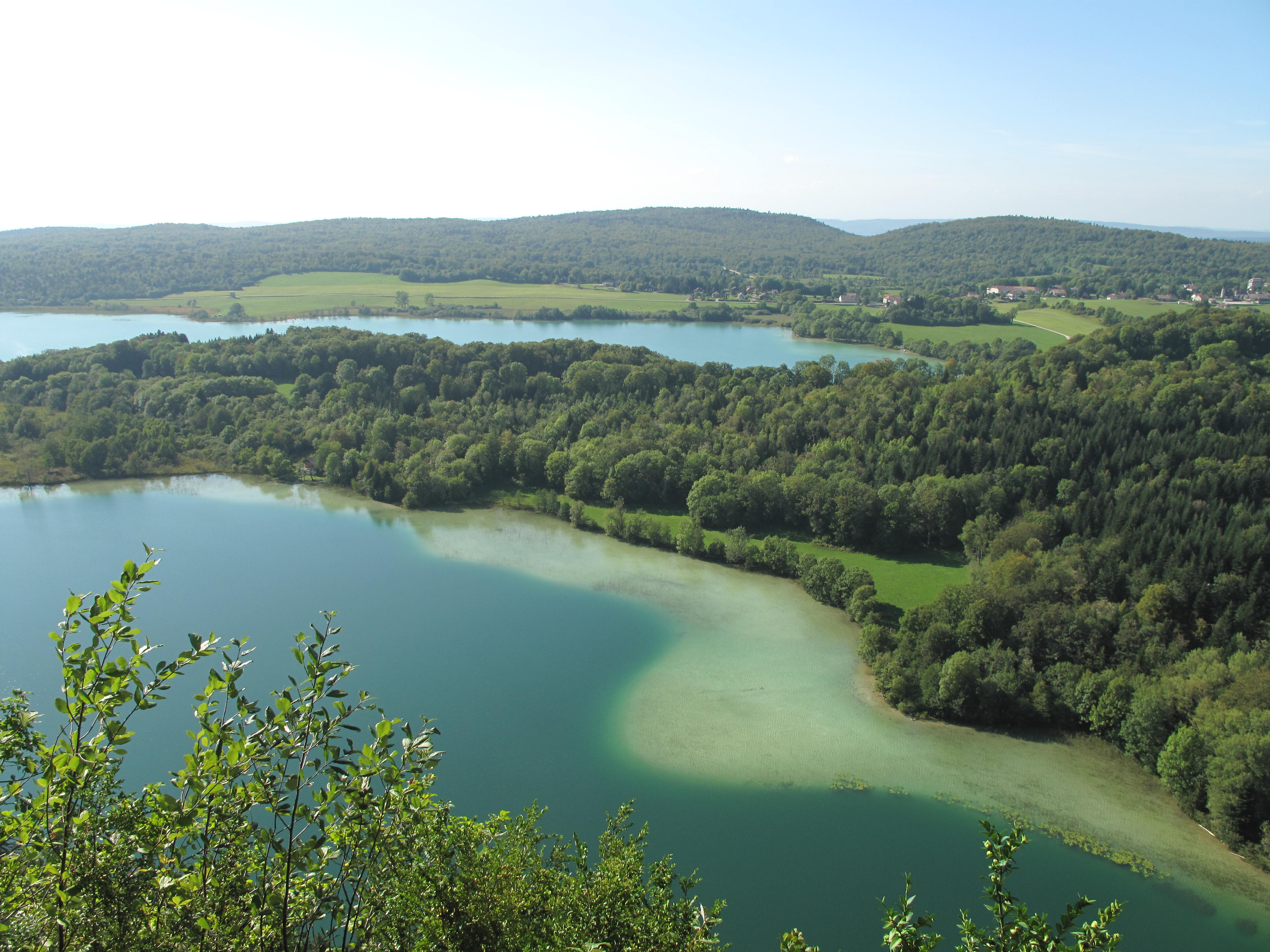
The Lac d'Ilay with Grand Maclu in the foreground
