= Vernois =

Vernois may refer to:

== Places ==
- Lac du Vernois, a lake in Le Frasnois, France.
- Le Vernois, a commune in the Jura department in Bourgogne-Franche-Comté in eastern France.
- Magny-Vernois, a commune in Bourgogne-Franche-Comté, France.
- Mont-le-Vernois, a commune in Bourgogne-Franche-Comté, France.
- Vernois-lès-Belvoir, a commune in the Doubs department in the Bourgogne-Franche-Comté region in eastern France.
- Vernois-lès-Vesvres, a commune in the Côte-d'Or department in eastern France
- Vernois-sur-Mance, a commune in the Haute-Saône department in eastern France

== People ==
- Julius von Verdy du Vernois (1832–1910), German general.
- Maxime Vernois (1809–1877), French medical hygienist.
