= Lacs de Maclu =

Pair of lakes in France

Grand Lac Maclu
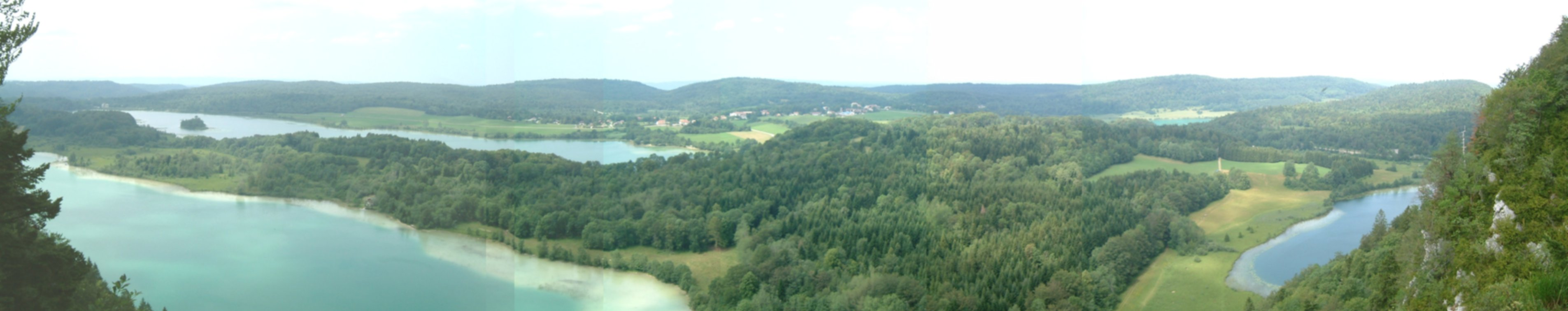

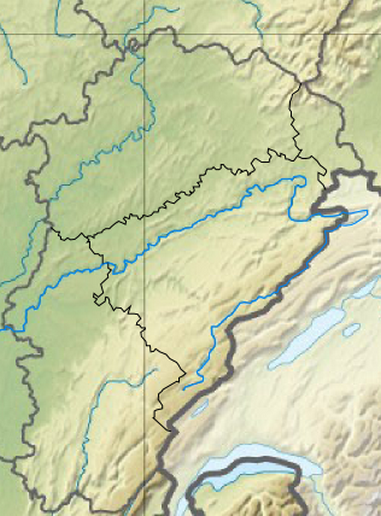
- Location within Franche-Comté
- Location: Jura department, Franche-Comté
- Coordinates: 46°37′31.3″N 5°54′26.8″E
- Basin countries: France
- Max. length: 1.1 km (0.68 mi)
- Max. width: 300 m (980 ft)
- Surface area: 0.21 km^{2} (0.081 sq mi)
- Max. depth: 24 m (79 ft)
- Surface elevation: 779 m (2,556 ft)
- Settlements: Le Frasnois

Lacs de Maclu (or Lacs de Maclus) are two lakes at Le Frasnois in the Jura department of France.

The Grand Lac Maclu has a surface area of 21 ha and a length of 1.1 km with a maximum width of 300 m. Its maximum depth is 24 m. The lake is located in the municipalities of Le Frasnois and La Chaux-du-Dombief.

Petit Lac Maclu is located northeast of the former and has a surface area of 5 ha with a length of 500 m and a maximum width of 120 m. Its maximum depth is 11 m. The lake is located in with the municipality of Le Frasnois.
