= Lac de Bonlieu =

Lake in France

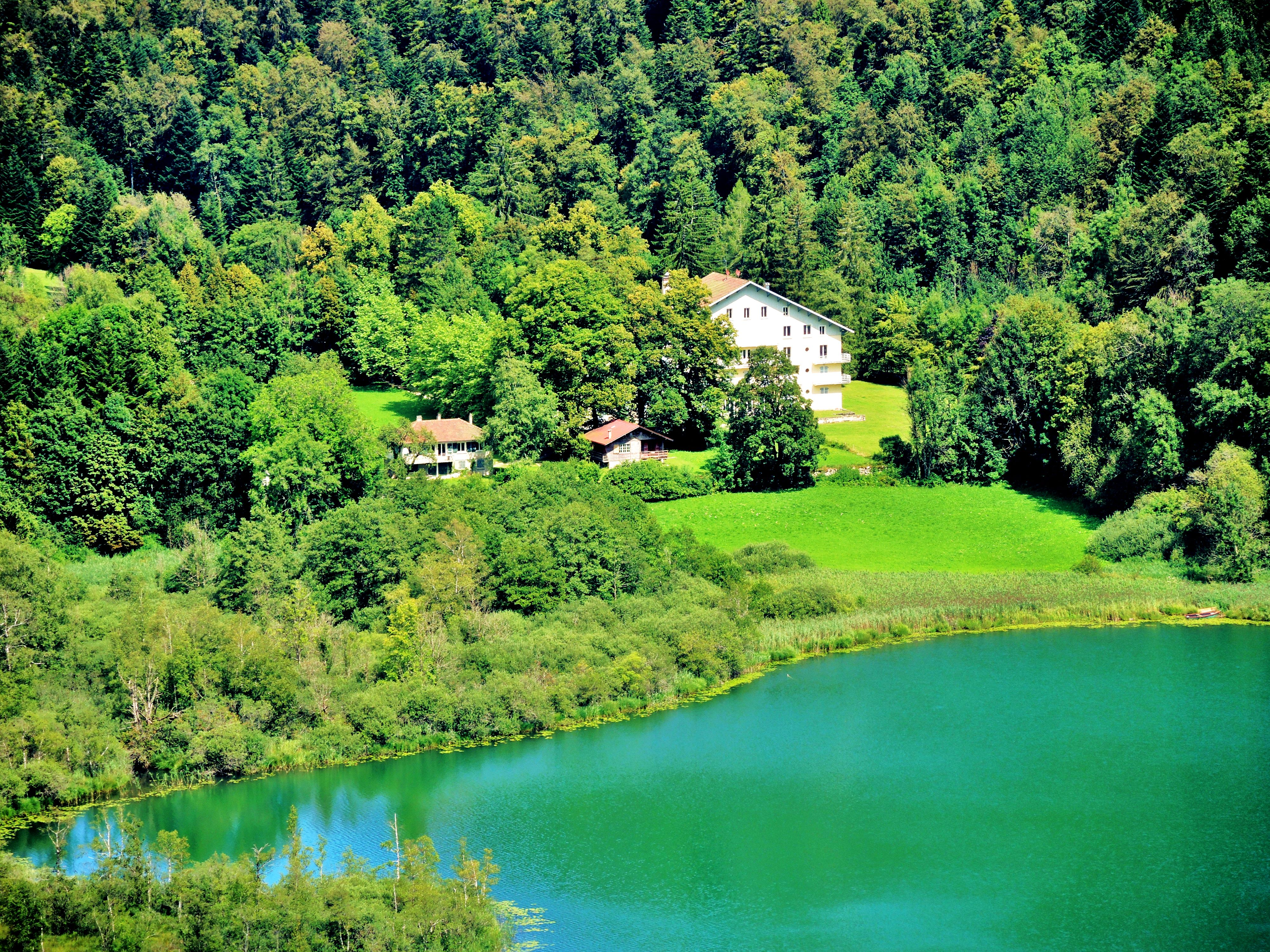
- View of the lake

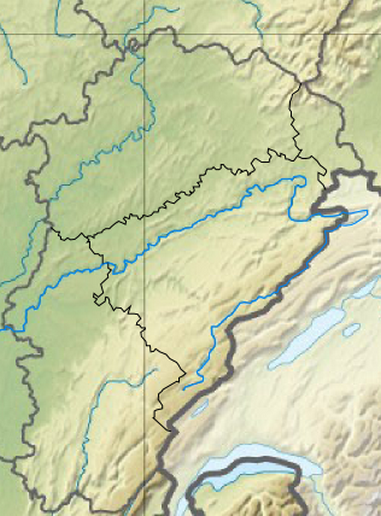
- Location within Franche-Comté
- Location: Jura department, Bourgogne-Franche-Comté
- Coordinates: 46°35′10″N 5°52′25″E
- Primary inflows: Underground
- Primary outflows: Hérisson
- Basin countries: France
- Max. length: 730 m (2,400 ft)
- Max. width: 300 m (980 ft)
- Surface area: 22 ha (54 acres)
- Max. depth: 10 m (33 ft)
- Surface elevation: 780 m (2,560 ft)

The Lac de Bonlieu (English: Lake of Bonlieu) is a lake in the Jura department, Bourgogne-Franche-Comté, France. It is named after the commune of Bonlieu.

The shoreline is composed of peat bogs, surrounded by a forest of beech and fir trees, and the lake is accessible from the north by a walking path. The lake's dark blue colour is due to limestone and marl in the lakebed.

The lake is a popular spot for fishing, with perch, roach, rudd and sculpins to be caught.
