= Lac de l'Abbaye =

Lake in Jura, Bourgogne-Franche-Comté, France

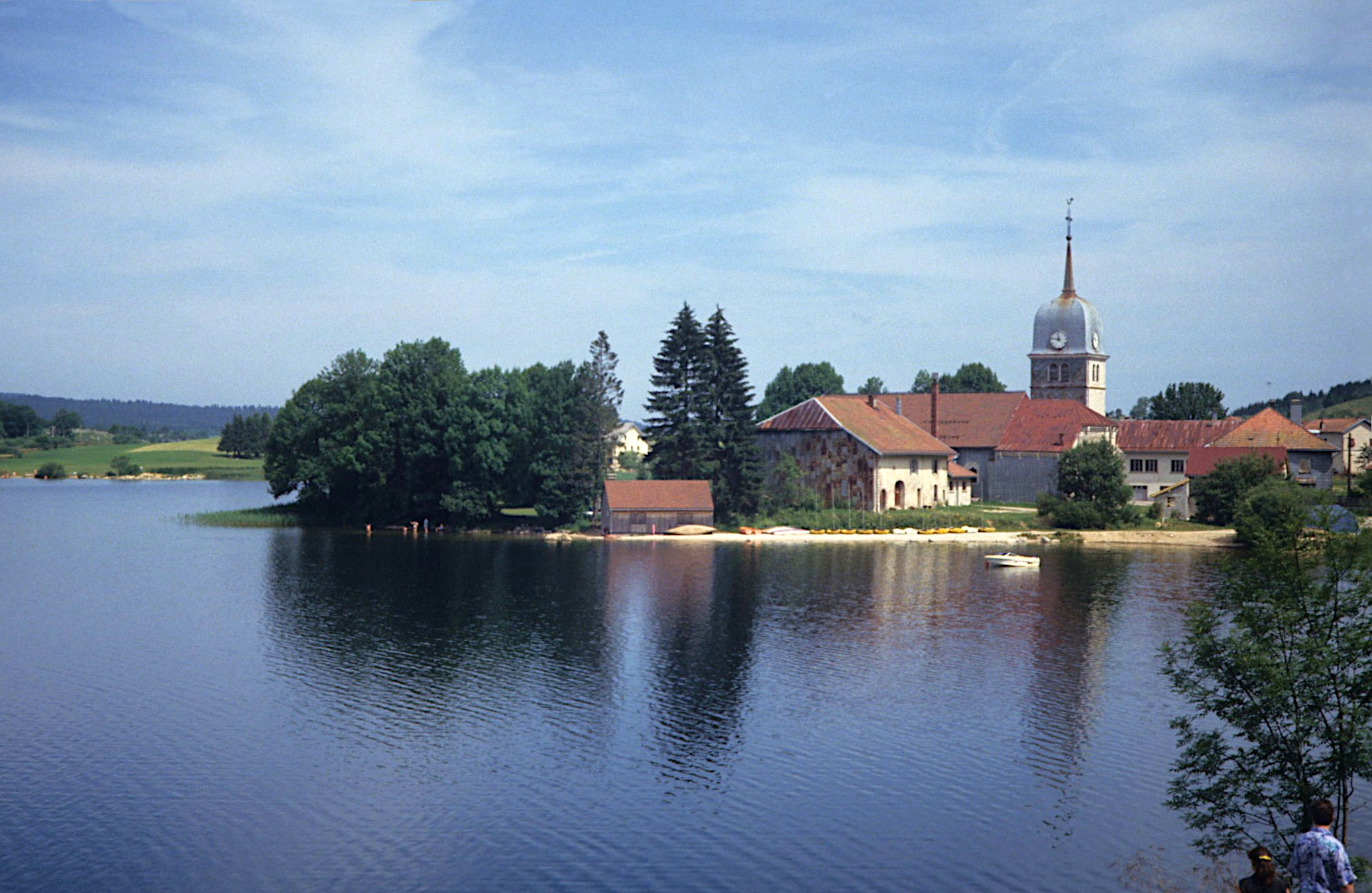

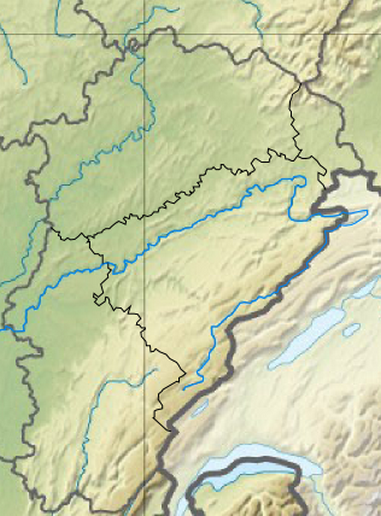
- Location within Franche-Comté
- Location: Grande-Rivière, Jura department, Franche-Comté
- Coordinates: 46°31′47.87″N 5°54′44.51″E
- Catchment area: 3.25 km^{2} (1.25 sq mi)
- Basin countries: France
- Max. length: 2.1 km (1.3 mi)
- Max. width: 600 m (2,000 ft)
- Surface area: 0.9 km^{2} (0.35 sq mi)
- Average depth: 9.5 m (31 ft)
- Max. depth: 19.5 m (64 ft)
- Water volume: 5.8 hm^{3} (4,700 acre⋅ft)
- Surface elevation: 879 m (2,884 ft)

Lac de l'Abbaye, also known as Lac de Grandvaux or Lac de la Grande Rivière, is a glacial lake in the commune of Grande-Rivière, in the Jura department of France. It is located at an altitude of 879 m (2,884 ft), on the edge of Jura Mountains, 7 km (4.3 mi) south of Saint-Laurent-en-Grandvaux.

The lake owes its name to the abbey of Saint-Claude, which was constructed its banks in the 12th century. Only the reconstructed 19th century church remains.

The lake is 2.1 km (1.3 mi) in length, 600 m (2,000 ft) wide, covering an area of 120 ha (300 acres). There is a small inflow at the northern end, but the lake is mainly fed from precipitation. Water is lost via a sinkhole. The catchment area of the lake is approximately 350 ha (860 acres).
