= Lac de Viremont =

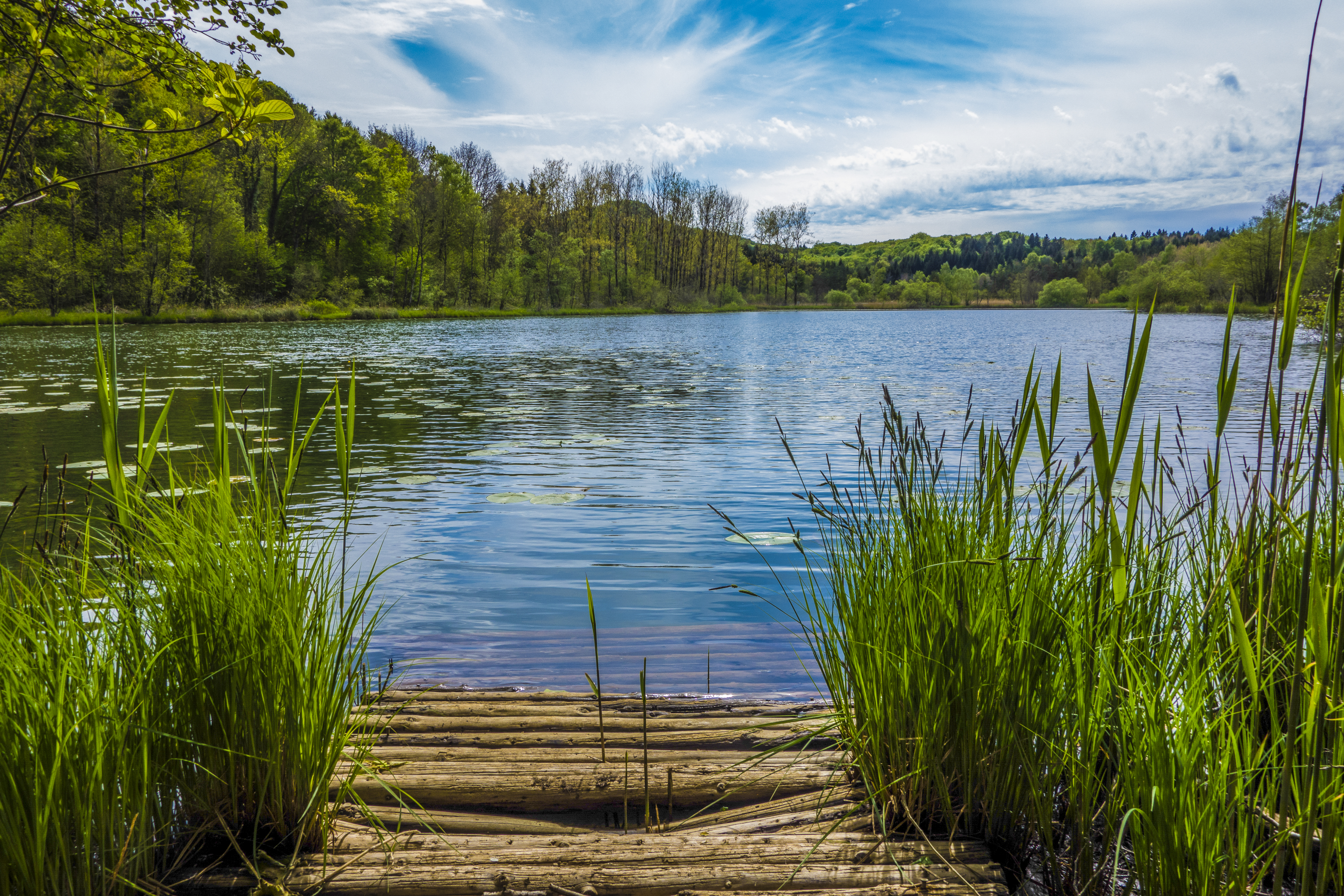

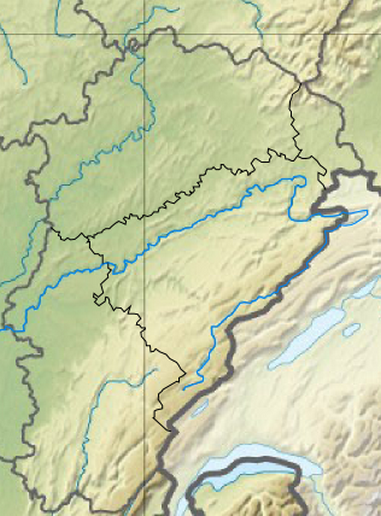
- Location within Franche-Comté
- Location: Jura department, Franche-Comté
- Coordinates: 46°25′35″N 5°37′40″E
- Type: Artificial lake
- Primary inflows: ruisseau du Danfia
- Primary outflows: Ponors
- Basin countries: France
- Max. length: 0.3 km (0.19 mi)
- Max. width: 0.07 km (0.043 mi)
- Surface area: 20,050 m^{2} (215,800 sq ft)
- Max. depth: 4 m (13 ft)

Lac de Viremont is a small lake near the village of Viremont, at Légna in the Jura department of France. It lies at a height of 656 m, and offers 2ha of waters. It lies amidst a larger fen area and was erected as a ZNIEFF.

== Sources ==
- http://inpn.mnhn.fr/zone/znieff/430007774?lg=en (consulted 2013/08/15)
