= Arrondissements of the Jura department =

Administrative divisions of Jura, France

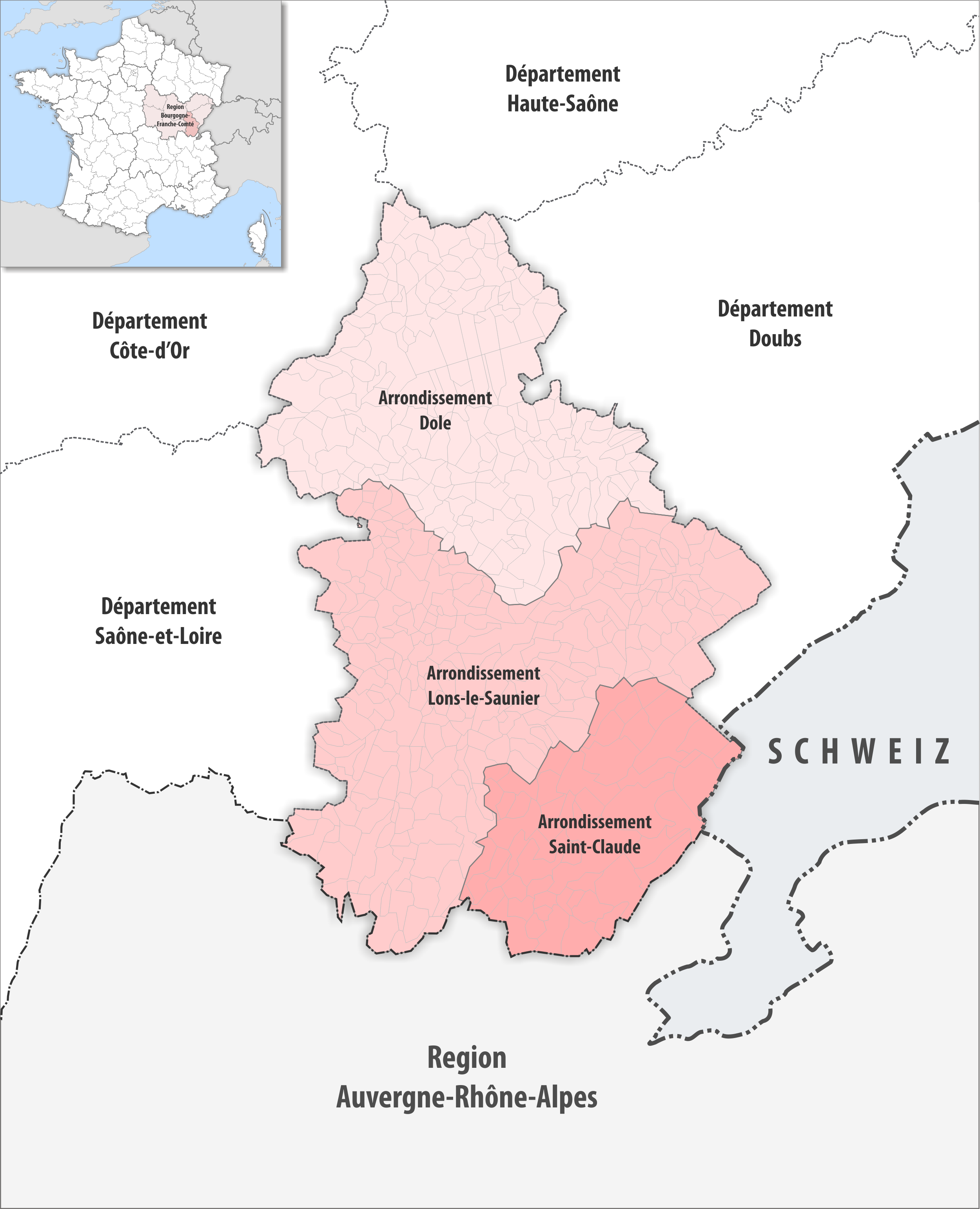
Map of arrondissements of the Jura department.

The 3 arrondissements of the Jura department are:

1. Arrondissement of Dole, (subprefecture: Dole) with 190 communes. The population of the arrondissement was 106,178 in 2021.
2. Arrondissement of Lons-le-Saunier, (prefecture of the Jura department: Lons-le-Saunier) with 249 communes. The population of the arrondissement was 104,178 in 2021.
3. Arrondissement of Saint-Claude, (subprefecture: Saint-Claude) with 55 communes. The population of the arrondissement was 48,208 in 2021.

== History ==
In 1800 the arrondissements of Lons-le-Saunier, Dole, Poligny and Saint-Claude were established. The arrondissement of Poligny was disbanded in 1926. In May 2006 the arrondissement of Dole absorbed the canton of Villers-Farlay from the arrondissement of Lons-le-Saunier, and it lost the canton of Chaumergy to the arrondissement of Lons-le-Saunier.

The borders of the arrondissements of Jura were modified in January 2017:

- 66 communes from the arrondissement of Lons-le-Saunier to the arrondissement of Dole
- four communes from the arrondissement of Saint-Claude to the arrondissement of Lons-le-Saunier
