= Lac du Val =

Lake in France

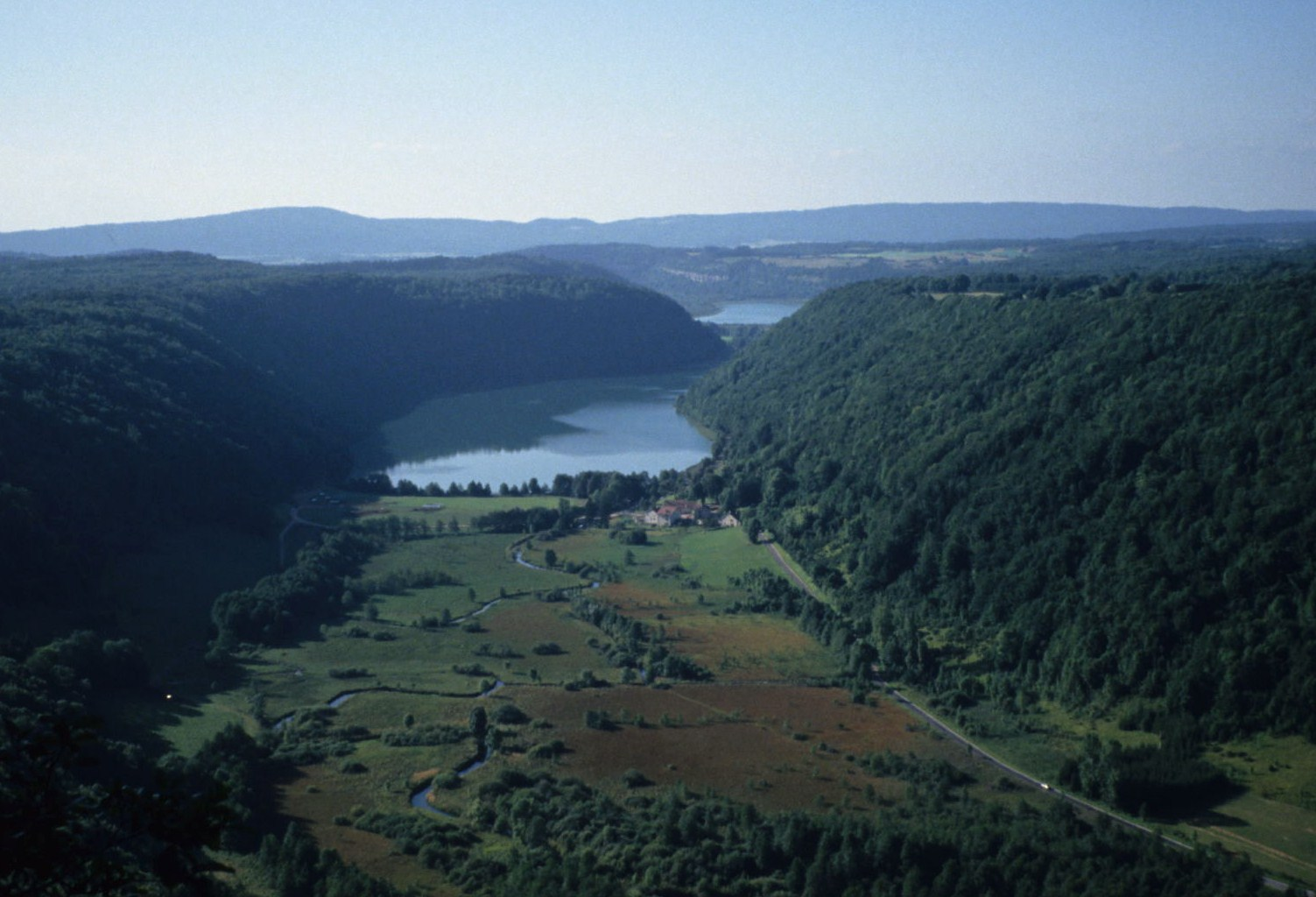

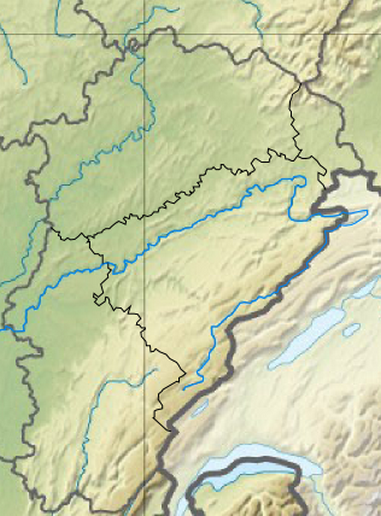
- Location within Franche-Comté
- Location: Jura department, Franche-Comté
- Coordinates: 46°37′34″N 5°48′51″E
- Primary inflows: Hérisson
- Primary outflows: Hérisson
- Basin countries: France
- Max. length: 1.5 km (0.93 mi)
- Max. width: 450 m (1,480 ft)
- Surface area: 64 ha (160 acres)
- Average depth: 25 m (82 ft)
- Max. depth: 35 m (115 ft)
- Surface elevation: 525 m (1,722 ft)

Lac du Val is a lake in the Jura department of France.
