= Lac du Vernois =

Lake in Jura, Bourgogne-Franche-Comté, France

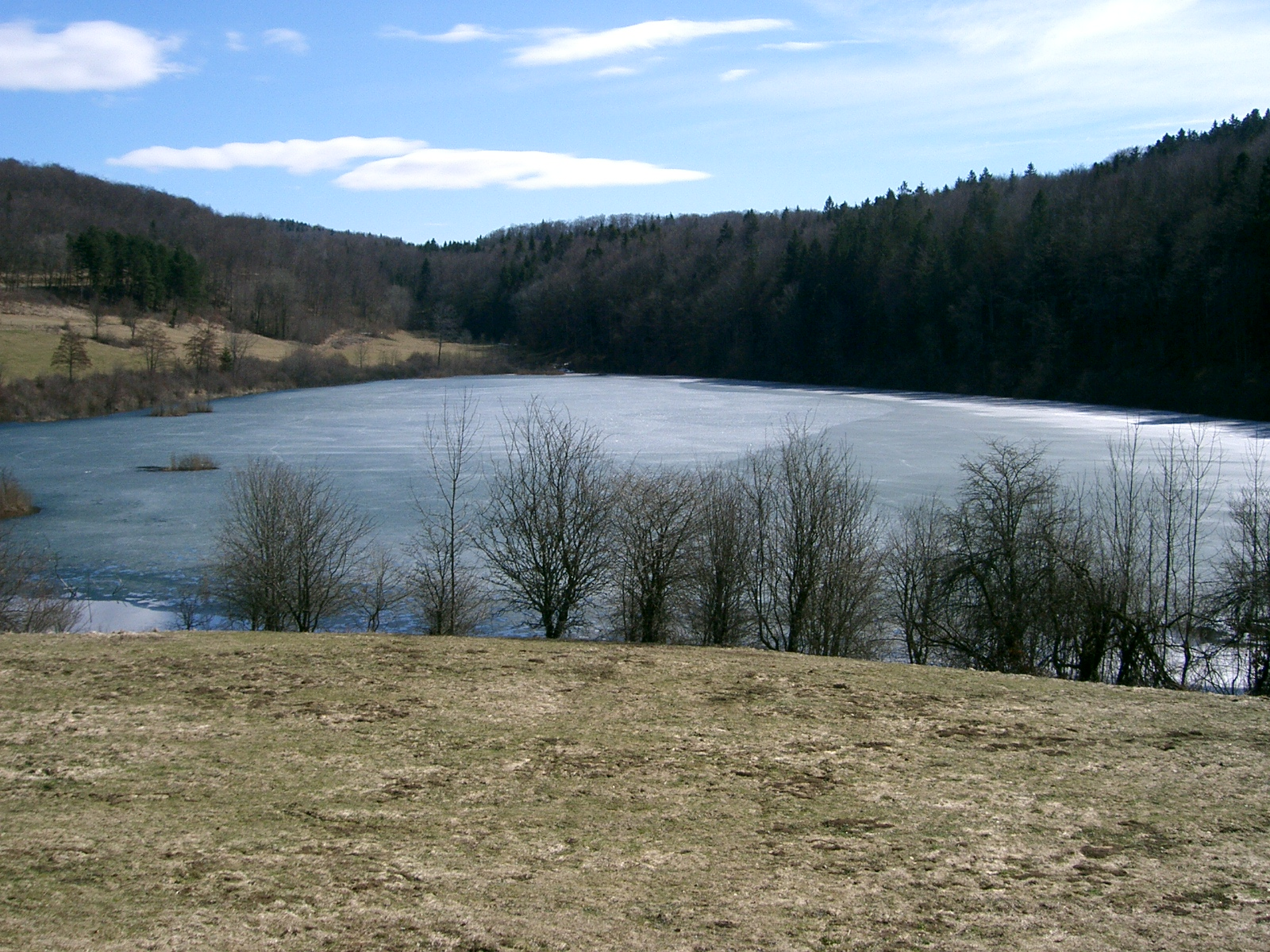

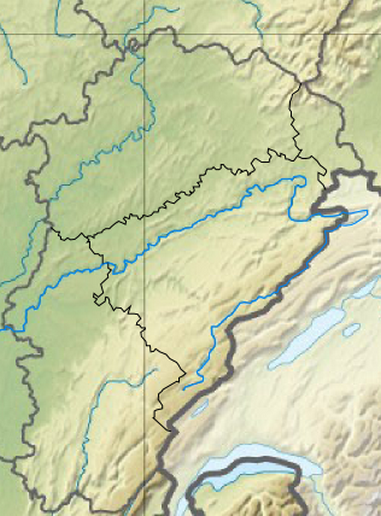
- Location within Franche-Comté
- Location: Le Frasnois, Jura department, Franche-Comté
- Coordinates: 46°38′50″N 5°53′16″E
- Primary outflows: underground
- Basin countries: France
- Surface area: 7 ha (17 acres)
- Max. depth: 32 m (105 ft)
- Surface elevation: 738 m (2,421 ft)

Lac du Vernois (French pronunciation: [lak dy vɛʁnwa]) is a lake at Le Frasnois, in the Jura department of France.
