= Lac de Chambly =

Lake in France

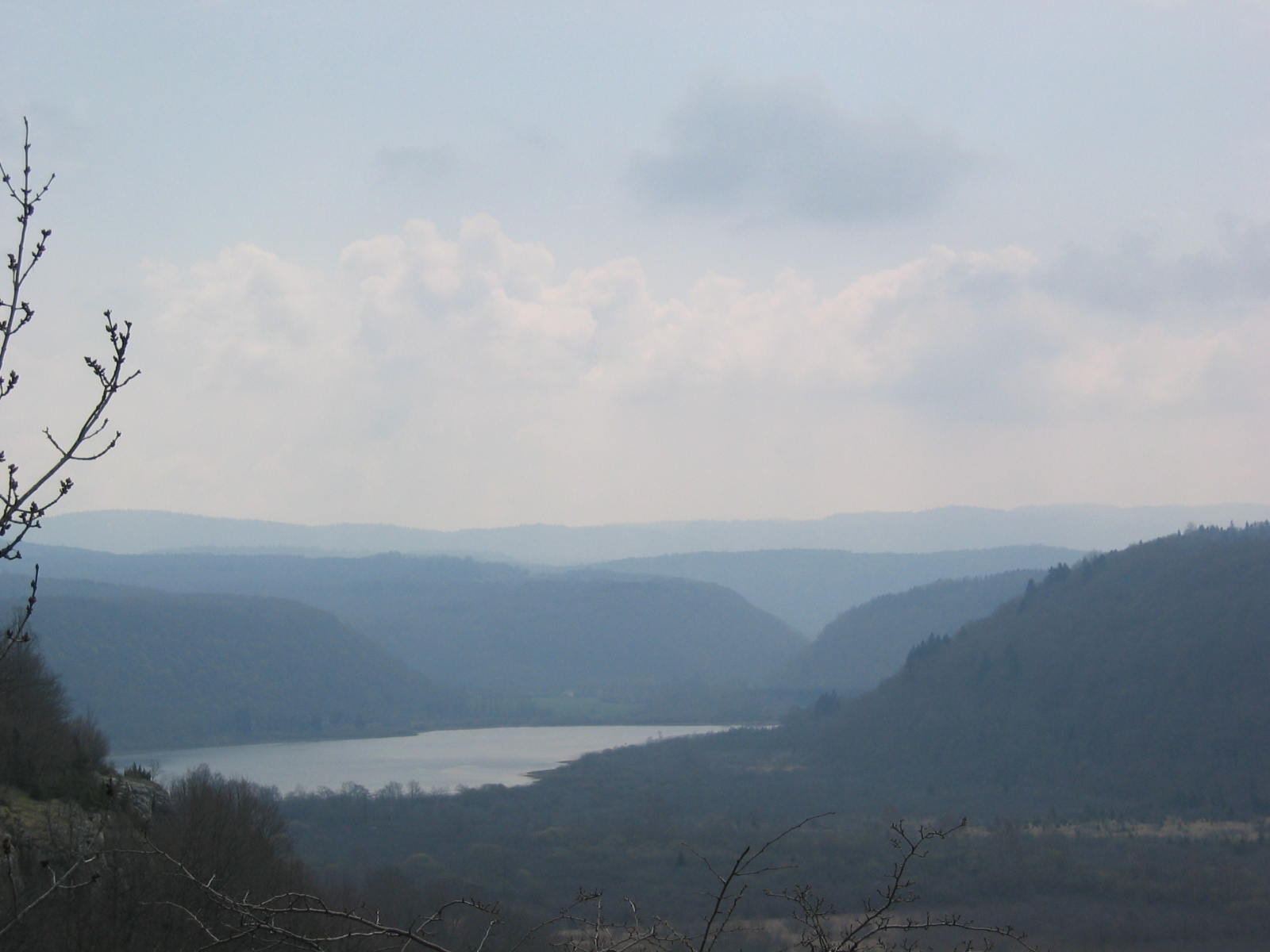

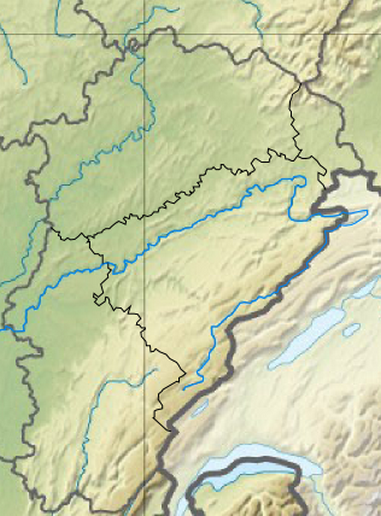
- Location within Franche-Comté
- Location: Jura department, Franche-Comté
- Coordinates: 46°38′39″N 5°48′16″E
- Type: Glacial
- Primary inflows: Hérisson
- Primary outflows: Hérisson
- Basin countries: France
- Max. length: 1.2 km (0.75 mi)
- Max. width: 400 m (1,300 ft)
- Surface area: 35 ha (86 acres)
- Average depth: 10 m (33 ft)
- Surface elevation: 520 m (1,710 ft)

Lac de Chambly is a lake in the Jura department of France.
