= Lac de Lamoura =

Lake in France

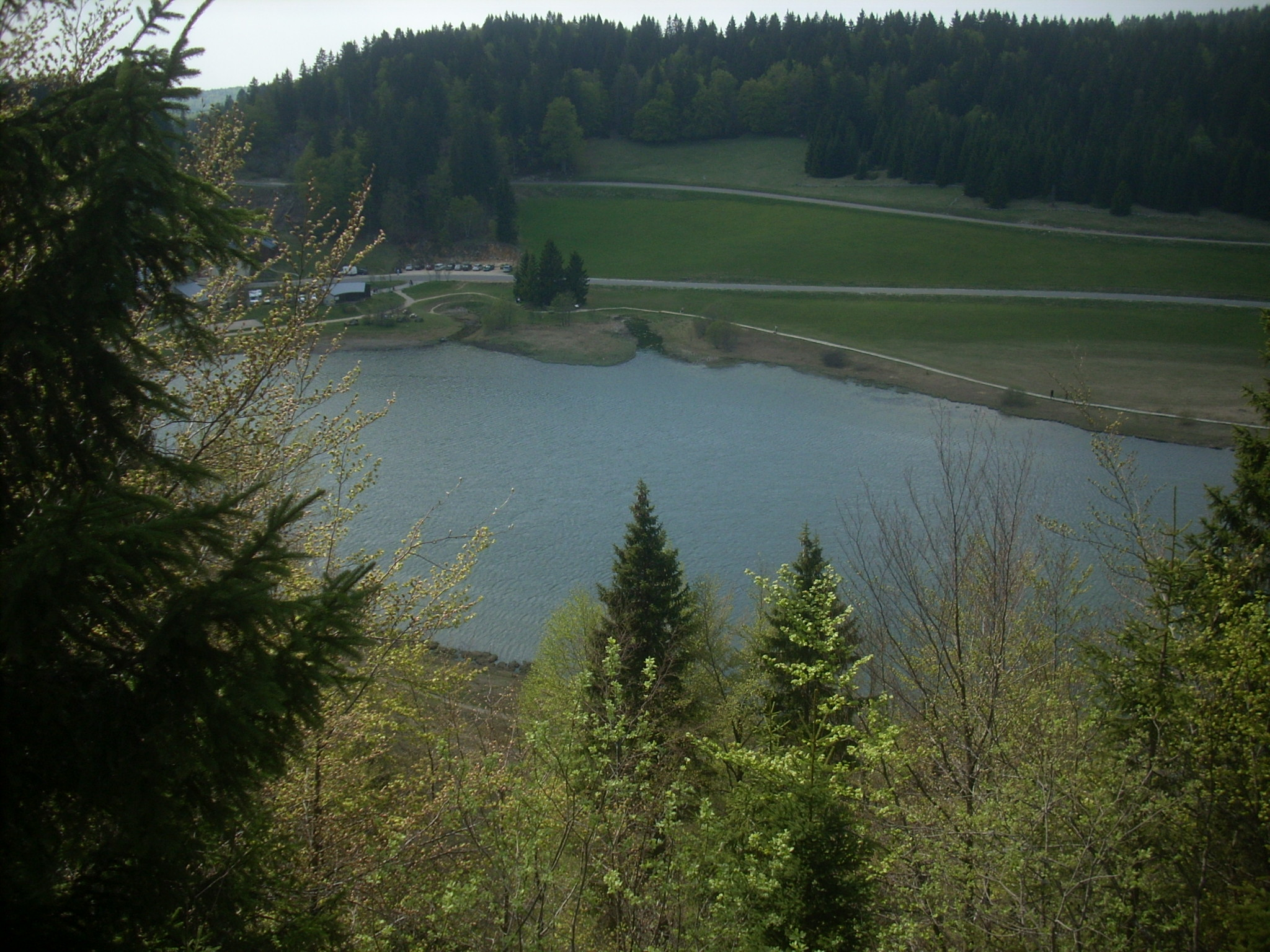

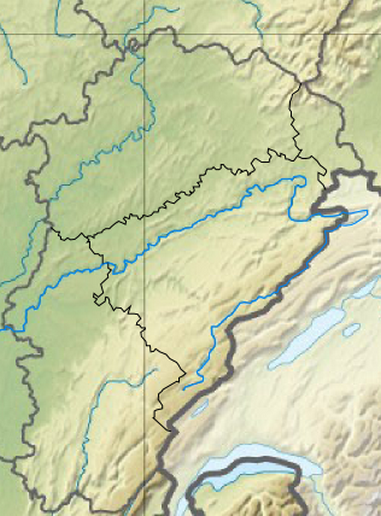
- Location within Franche-Comté
- Location: Jura department, Franche-Comté
- Coordinates: 46°23′43″N 5°58′55″E
- Primary inflows: Bief froid
- Primary outflows: underground
- Basin countries: France
- Max. length: 394 m (1,293 ft)
- Max. width: 123 m (404 ft)
- Surface area: 4.4 ha (11 acres)
- Average depth: 2.5 m (8.2 ft) estimated
- Max. depth: 7 m (23 ft)
- Surface elevation: 1,156 m (3,793 ft)

Lac de Lamoura is a lake at Lamoura in the Jura department of France. It is the highest lake in the Jura at an elevation of 1,156 metres.
