= Lac de Vouglans =

Reservoir in France

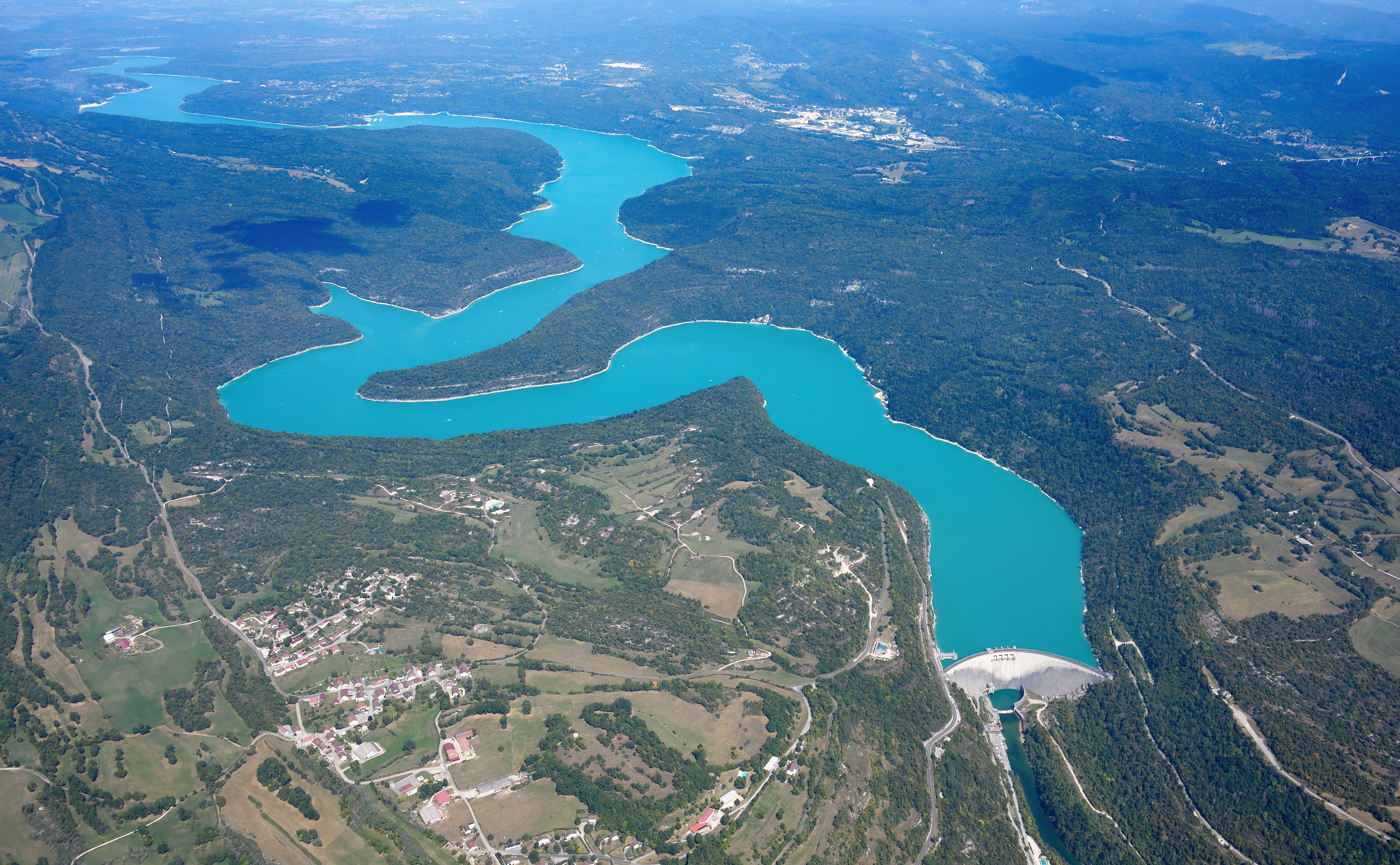

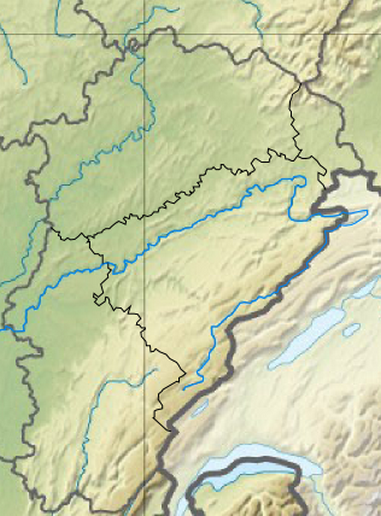
- Location within Franche-Comté
- Location: Jura, Franche-Comté
- Coordinates: 46°29′6″N 5°40′51″E
- Primary inflows: Ain
- Primary outflows: Ain
- Basin countries: France
- Max. length: 30 km (19 mi)
- Max. width: 800 m (2,600 ft)
- Surface area: 16 km^{2} (6.2 sq mi)
- Max. depth: 100 m (330 ft)
- Residence time: 180 days
- Surface elevation: 429 m (1,407 ft)

The Lac de Vouglans is the reservoir of the hydro-electric power station at Vouglans on the river Ain in the département of Jura in the region of Bourgogne-Franche-Comté in eastern France. The dam, the Barrage de Vouglans is at coordinates 46°23′51″N 5°39′56″E.

== Description ==
The lake lies on Jurassic rock crushed into north to south ridges by the Alpine orogeny. It is therefore long and narrow, though rather sinuous in plan. It is about 30 kilometres long though only 21 km in a straight line. It lies in the valley of the Ain, impounded by the dam at Cernon. The old village of Vouglans was displaced by its construction in 1968 by Électricité de France (EDF).

Some buildings of the Carthusian monastery of Vaucluse were also moved to make way for the rising waters and to save them from demolition.

The lake is arranged for tourism with view-points scattered through the woods which cover the hillsides along its shores and places set up for bathing and boating.

The annual mean flow of water at the dam is 40.80 cubic metres per second.

== Statistics ==
- Width: 300 to 800 m (330 to 870 yd)
- Capacity: 605,000,000 m³ (2,137 million ft³)
- Mean annual flow: 40.80 m³/s (1,441 ft³/s)

== See also ==
- Schéma directeur d'aménagement et de gestion des eaux
- Hydro and the environment
- Renewable energy in France
