= Lacs d'Étival =

Pair of lakes in France

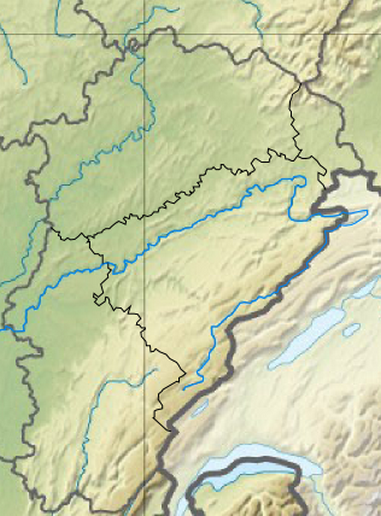
- Location within Franche-Comté
- Location: Jura department, Franche-Comté
- Coordinates: 46°30′18″N 5°48′19″E
- Primary inflows: springs
- Primary outflows: groundwater
- Catchment area: 3.85 km^{2} (1.49 sq mi)
- Basin countries: France
- Max. length: 1,500 m (4,900 ft)
- Max. width: 150 m (490 ft)
- Surface area: 15 ha (37 acres)
- Average depth: ca. 2 m (6 ft 7 in)
- Max. depth: 8 m (26 ft)
- Surface elevation: 800 m (2,600 ft)

Lacs d'Étival are two lakes, the small lake (petit lac) and the big lake (grand lac), at Étival in the Jura department of France. The lakes are part of the preserve "Complexe des bois et du lac de l'Assencière" .
