= Lac d'Onoz =

Lake in France

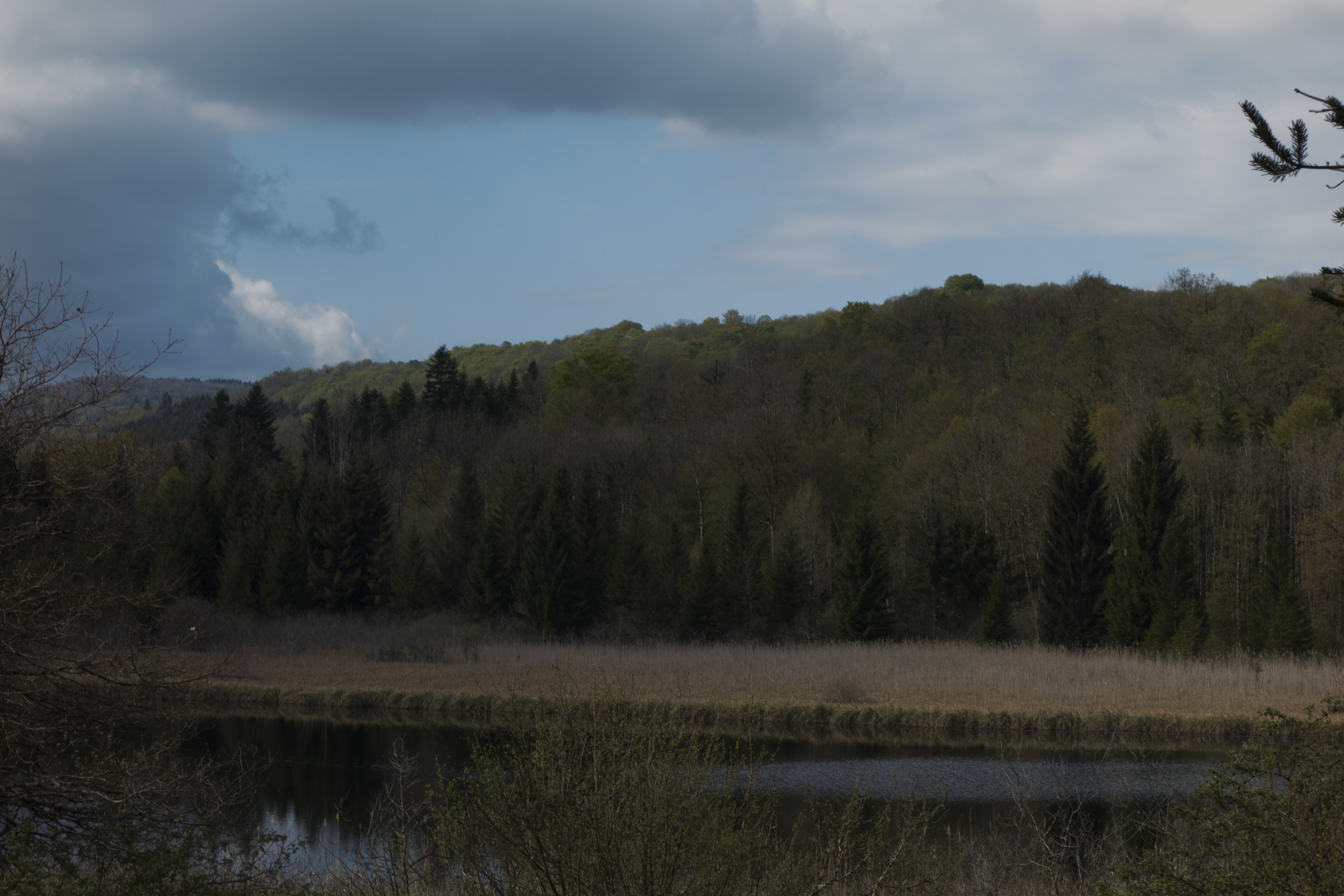
- Lac d'Onoz, 2016, Jura, near lac de Vouglans

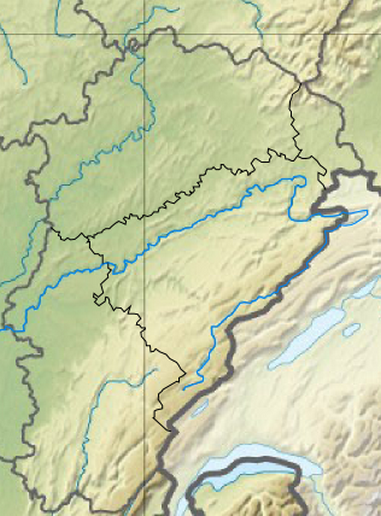
- Location within Franche-Comté
- Location: Jura department, Franche-Comté
- Coordinates: 46°28′34″N 5°39′15″E
- Basin countries: France
- Surface area: 8,700 m^{2} (94,000 sq ft)

Lac d'Onoz is a lake at Onoz in the Jura department of France.
