= Lac d'Antre =

Lake in France

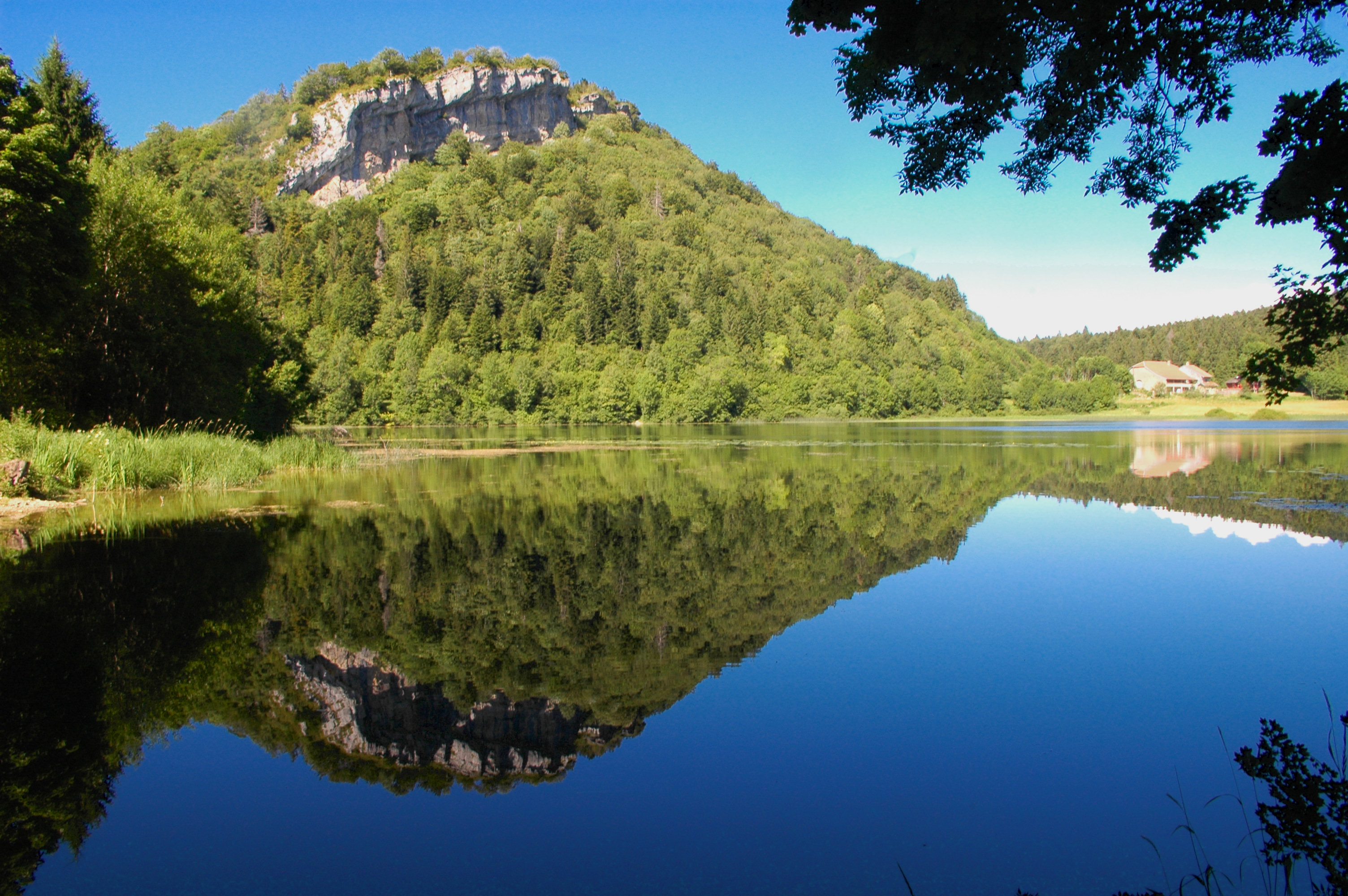

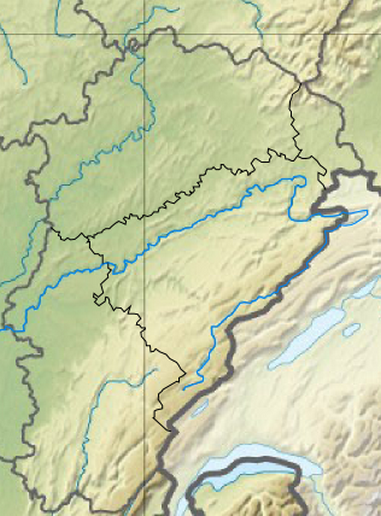
- Location within Franche-Comté
- Location: Jura department, Franche-Comté
- Coordinates: 46.4145°N 5.7500°E
- Primary outflows: Héria
- Basin countries: France
- Max. length: 420 m (1,380 ft)
- Max. width: 240 m (790 ft)
- Surface area: 7.5 ha (19 acres)
- Average depth: 6 m (20 ft)
- Water volume: 600,000 m^{3} (490 acre⋅ft)
- Surface elevation: 800 m (2,600 ft)

Lac d'Antre is a lake above Villards-d'Héria, in the Jura department of France. The lake is located within the eastern edge of the commune Villards-d'Héria. It nestles at the cliff “La Roche d’Antre.”
