= Cantons of the Jura department =

The following is a list of the 17 cantons of the Jura department, in France, following the French canton reorganisation which came into effect in March 2015:

- Arbois
- Authume
- Bletterans
- Champagnole
- Coteaux du Lizon
- Dole-1
- Dole-2
- Hauts de Bienne
- Lons-le-Saunier-1
- Lons-le-Saunier-2
- Moirans-en-Montagne
- Mont-sous-Vaudrey
- Poligny
- Saint-Amour
- Saint-Claude
- Saint-Laurent-en-Grandvaux
- Tavaux
