= Chancia =

Commune in Bourgogne-Franche-Comté, France

- Commune
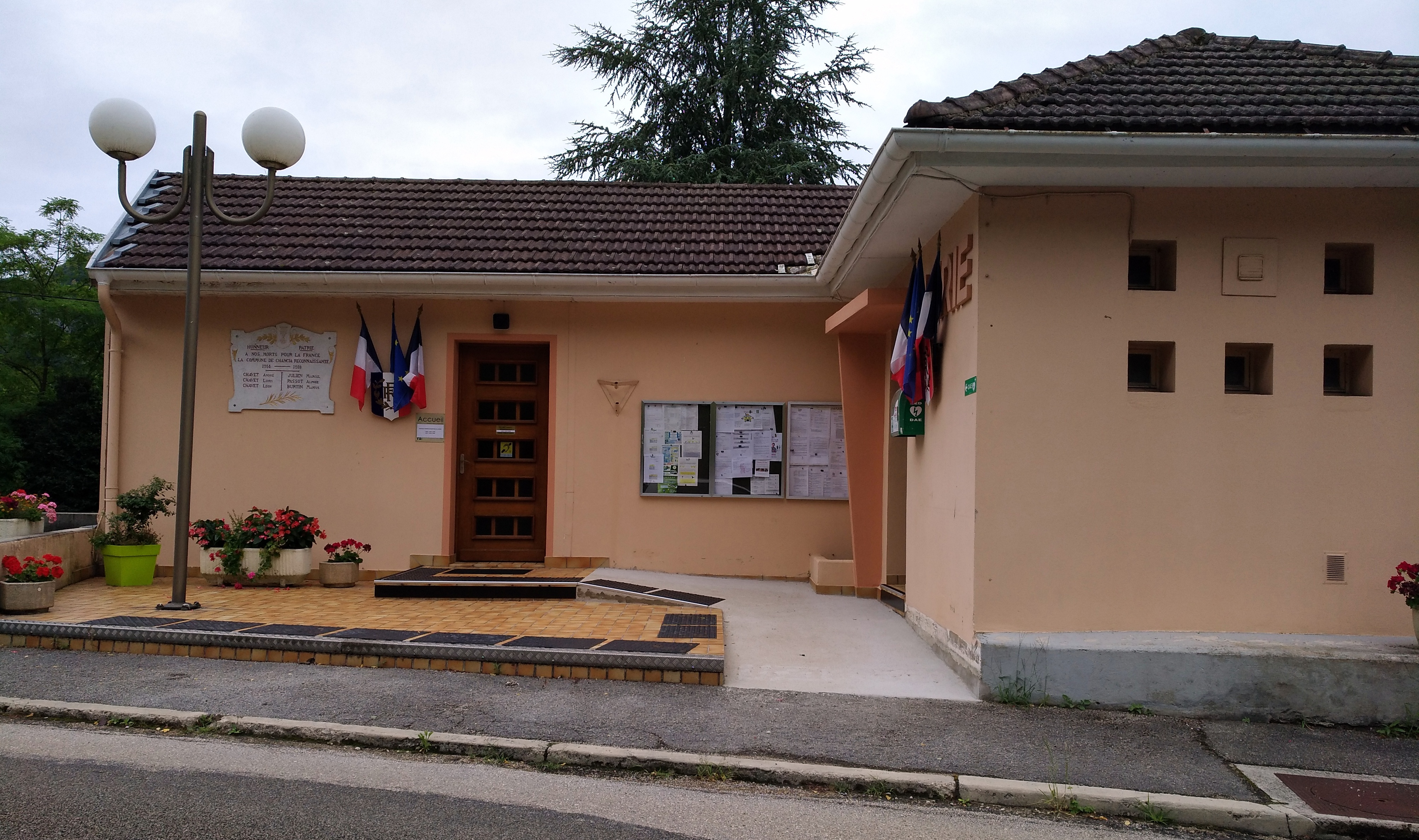
- The town hall in Chancia
- Location of Chancia
- Location within France Location within Bourgogne-Franche-Comté
- Coordinates: 46°20′49″N 5°38′36″E
- Country: France
- Region: Bourgogne-Franche-Comté
- Department: Jura
- Arrondissement: Saint-Claude
- Canton: Moirans-en-Montagne

Government
  - Mayor (2020–2026): Robert Bonin
- Area^{1}: 2.41 km^{2} (0.93 sq mi)
- Highest elevation: 680 m (2,230 ft)
- Lowest elevation: 300 m (980 ft)
- Population (2023): 211
  - Density: 87.6/km^{2} (227/sq mi)
- Time zone: UTC+01:00 (CET)
  - Summer (DST): UTC+02:00 (CEST)
- INSEE/Postal code: 39102 /01590
- ^{1} French Land Register data, which excludes lakes, ponds, glaciers > 1 km^{2} (0.386 sq mi or 247 acres) and river estuaries.

Chancia (French pronunciation: [ʃɑ̃sja]) is a commune in the Jura department in Bourgogne-Franche-Comté in eastern France.

== Population ==
Historical population
Year	Pop.	±% p.a.
1968	106	—
1975	77	−4.46%
1982	100	+3.80%
1990	87	−1.73%
1999	142	+5.59%
2007	224	+5.86%
2012	229	+0.44%
2017	226	−0.26%
2023	211	−1.14%
Source: INSEE

== Heraldry ==
Arms of Chancia	Wavy per fess: 1st azure semé of billets or with a lion issuant of the same, 2nd party per pale, I gules with a chess pawn argent and II argent with a fir tree eradicated vert trunked tenné.

== See also ==
- Communes of the Jura department
