= La Chaux-du-Dombief =

Commune in Bourgogne-Franche-Comté, France

- Commune
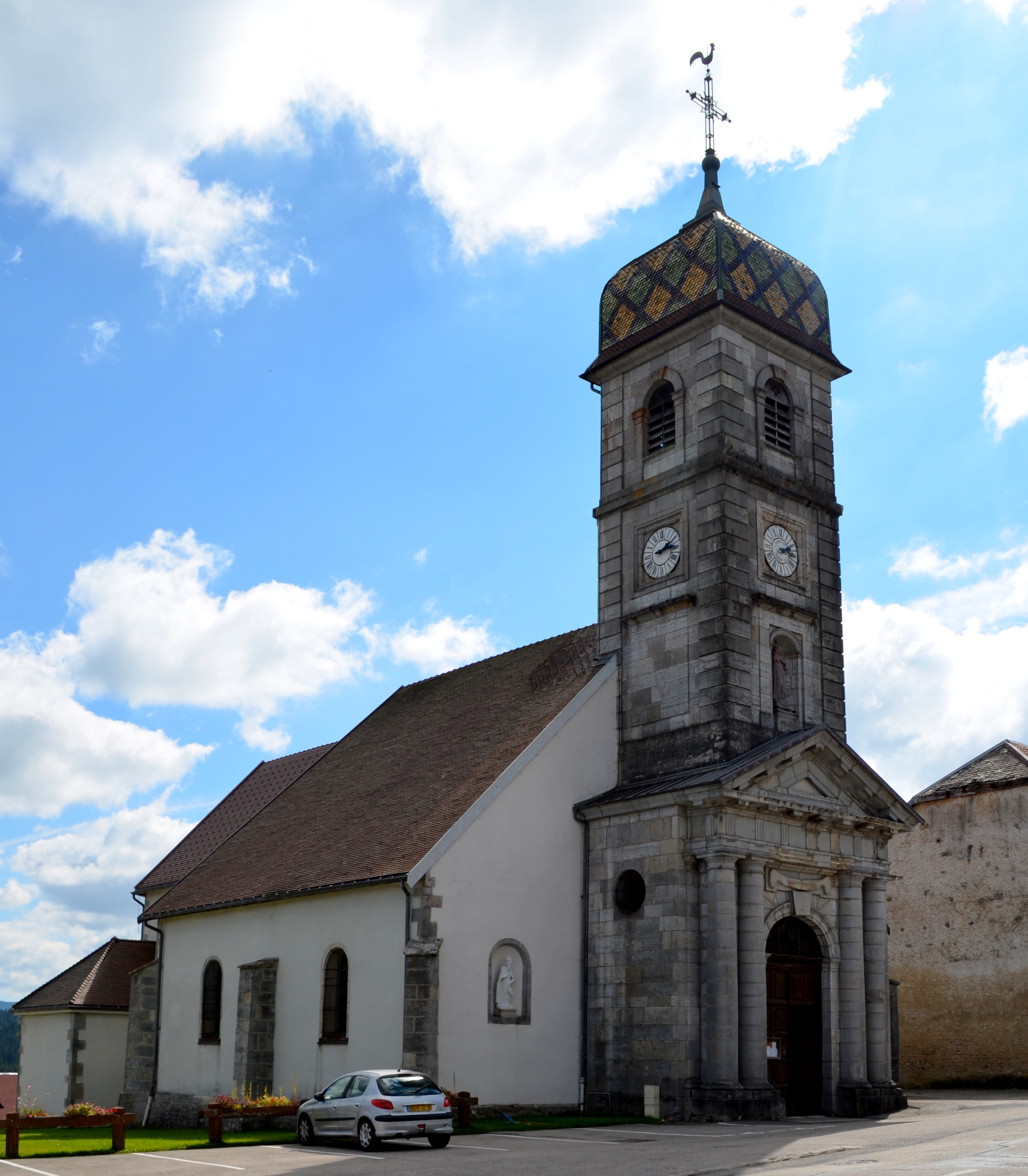
- The church in La Chaux-du-Dombief
- Location of La Chaux-du-Dombief
- Location within France Location within Bourgogne-Franche-Comté
- Coordinates: 46°36′11″N 5°54′06″E
- Country: France
- Region: Bourgogne-Franche-Comté
- Department: Jura
- Arrondissement: Saint-Claude
- Canton: Saint-Laurent-en-Grandvaux

Government
  - Mayor (2022–2026): Mélanie Jeunet
- Area^{1}: 21.65 km^{2} (8.36 sq mi)
- Highest elevation: 1,063 m (3,488 ft)
- Lowest elevation: 719 m (2,359 ft)
- Population (2023): 574
  - Density: 26.5/km^{2} (68.7/sq mi)
- Time zone: UTC+01:00 (CET)
  - Summer (DST): UTC+02:00 (CEST)
- INSEE/Postal code: 39131 /39150
- ^{1} French Land Register data, which excludes lakes, ponds, glaciers > 1 km^{2} (0.386 sq mi or 247 acres) and river estuaries.

La Chaux-du-Dombief is a commune in the Jura department in Bourgogne-Franche-Comté in eastern France.

== Population ==
Historical population
Year	Pop.	±% p.a.
1968	324	—
1975	343	+0.82%
1982	422	+3.01%
1990	442	+0.58%
1999	488	+1.11%
2007	531	+1.06%
2012	530	−0.04%
2017	544	+0.52%
2023	574	+0.90%
Source: INSEE

== See also ==
- Communes of the Jura department
