= Étival, Jura =

Commune in Bourgogne-Franche-Comté, France

Étival
- Commune
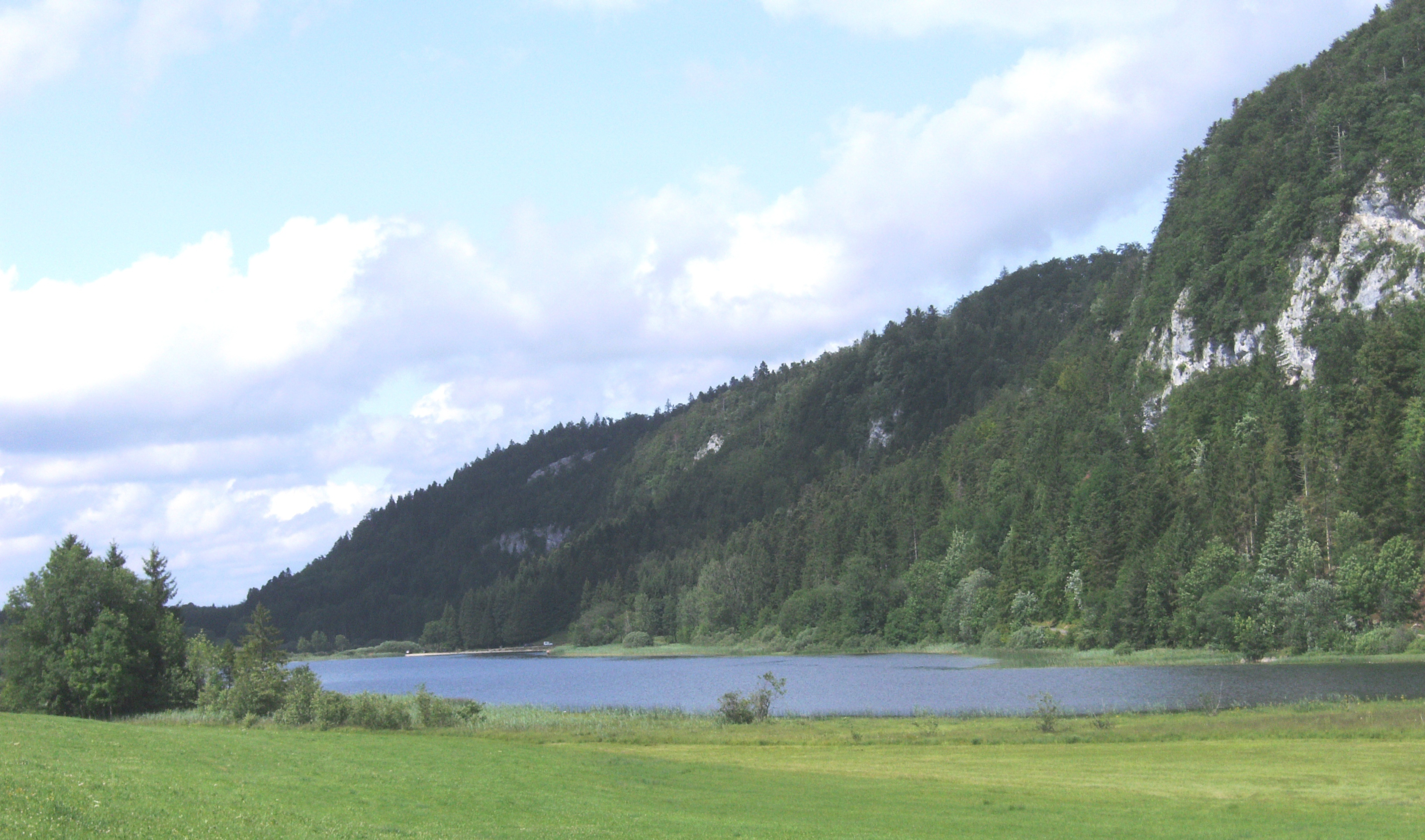
- Étival Lake
- Location of Étival
- Location within France Location within Bourgogne-Franche-Comté
- Coordinates: 46°30′29″N 5°47′33″E
- Country: France
- Region: Bourgogne-Franche-Comté
- Department: Jura
- Arrondissement: Saint-Claude
- Canton: Moirans-en-Montagne

Government
  - Mayor (2023–2026): Carole Delorme
- Area^{1}: 13.83 km^{2} (5.34 sq mi)
- Highest elevation: 1,027 m (3,369 ft)
- Lowest elevation: 759 m (2,490 ft)
- Population (2023): 302
  - Density: 21.8/km^{2} (56.6/sq mi)
- Time zone: UTC+01:00 (CET)
  - Summer (DST): UTC+02:00 (CEST)
- INSEE/Postal code: 39216 /39130
- ^{1} French Land Register data, which excludes lakes, ponds, glaciers > 1 km^{2} (0.386 sq mi or 247 acres) and river estuaries.

Étival (French pronunciation: [etival]; sometimes referred to as Étival-les-Ronchaux) is a commune in the Jura department in Bourgogne-Franche-Comté in eastern France.

== Population ==
Historical population
Year	Pop.	±% p.a.
1968	429	—
1975	395	−1.17%
1982	351	−1.67%
1990	307	−1.66%
1999	285	−0.82%
2007	307	+0.93%
2012	316	+0.58%
2017	308	−0.51%
2023	302	−0.33%
Source: INSEE

== See also ==
- Communes of the Jura department
