= Le Frasnois =

Commune in Bourgogne-Franche-Comté, France

- Commune
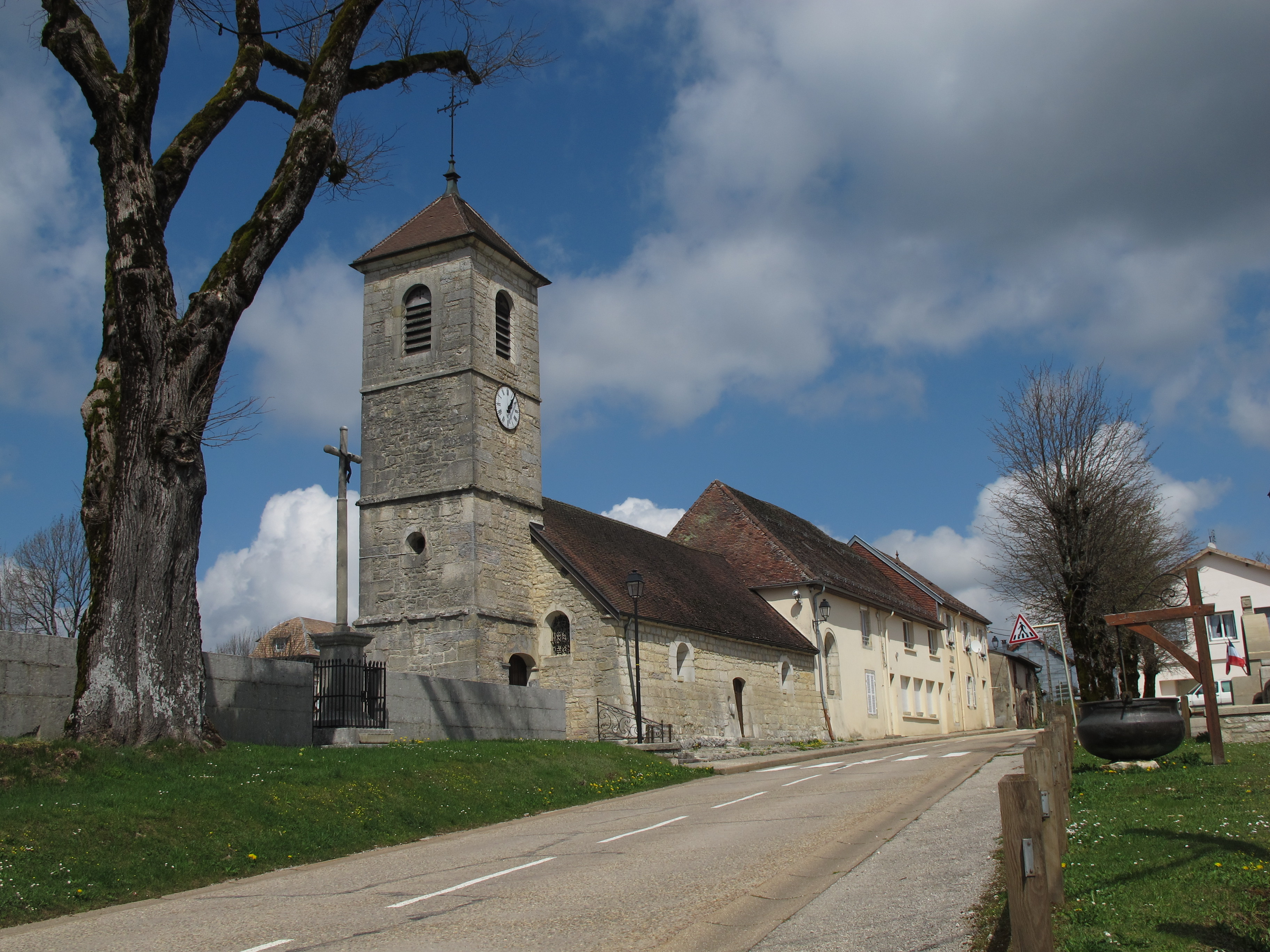
- The church in Le Frasnois
- Location of Le Frasnois
- Location within France Location within Bourgogne-Franche-Comté
- Coordinates: 46°38′11″N 5°53′54″E
- Country: France
- Region: Bourgogne-Franche-Comté
- Department: Jura
- Arrondissement: Lons-le-Saunier
- Canton: Saint-Laurent-en-Grandvaux

Government
  - Mayor (2020–2026): Jean-Paul Maitre
- Area^{1}: 14.56 km^{2} (5.62 sq mi)
- Highest elevation: 930 m (3,050 ft)
- Lowest elevation: 680 m (2,230 ft)
- Population (2023): 170
  - Density: 12/km^{2} (30/sq mi)
- Time zone: UTC+01:00 (CET)
  - Summer (DST): UTC+02:00 (CEST)
- INSEE/Postal code: 39240 /39130
- ^{1} French Land Register data, which excludes lakes, ponds, glaciers > 1 km^{2} (0.386 sq mi or 247 acres) and river estuaries.

Le Frasnois (French pronunciation: [lə fʁanwa]; Arpitan: Lou Frainet) is a commune in the Jura department in Bourgogne-Franche-Comté in eastern France.

== Population ==
Historical population
Year	Pop.	±% p.a.
1968	103	—
1975	110	+0.94%
1982	114	+0.51%
1990	138	+2.42%
1999	151	+1.01%
2007	153	+0.16%
2012	153	+0.00%
2017	160	+0.90%
2023	170	+1.02%
Source: INSEE

== See also ==
- Communes of the Jura department
