= Jura (department) =

Department of France in Bourgogne-Franche-Comté

- Department of France
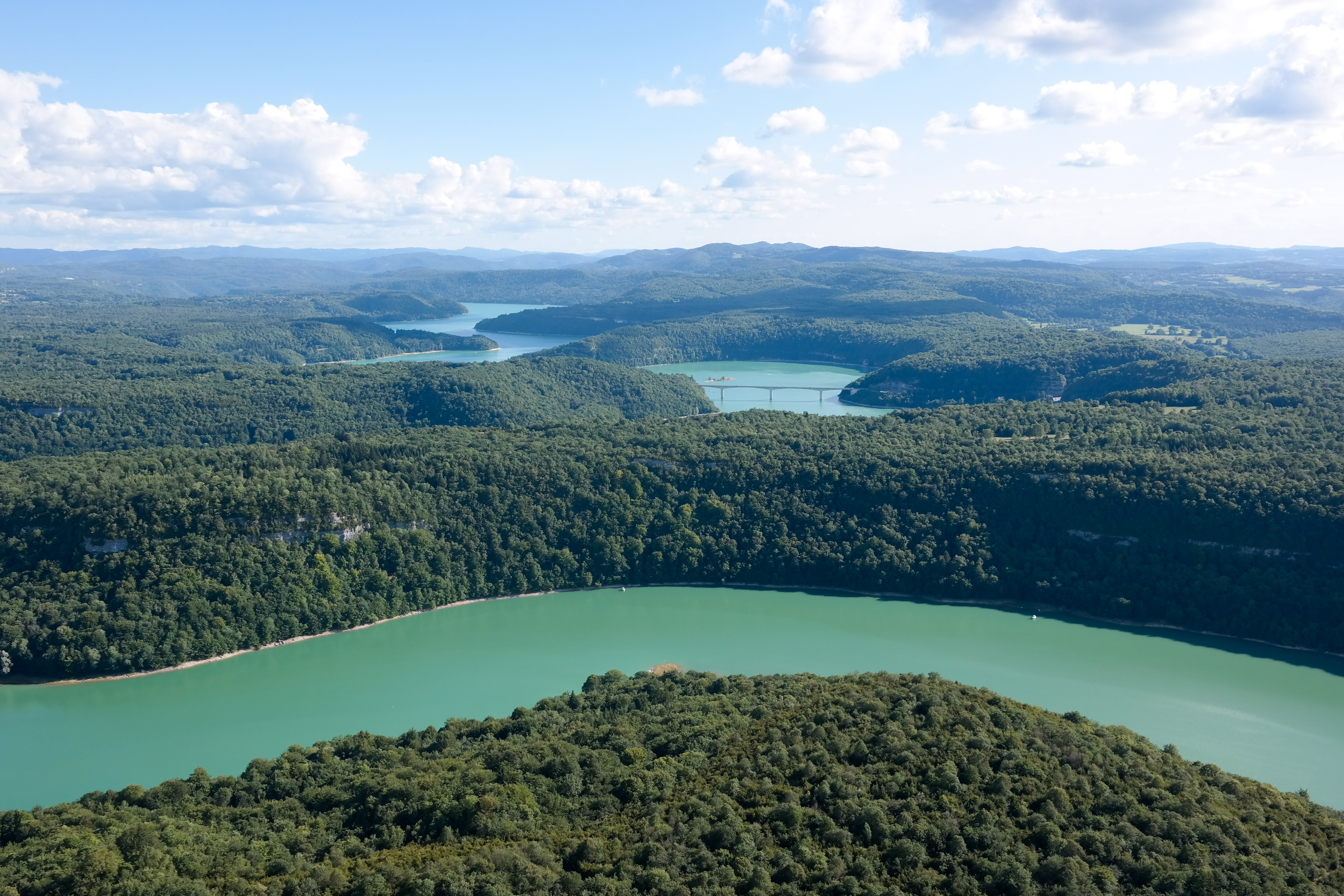
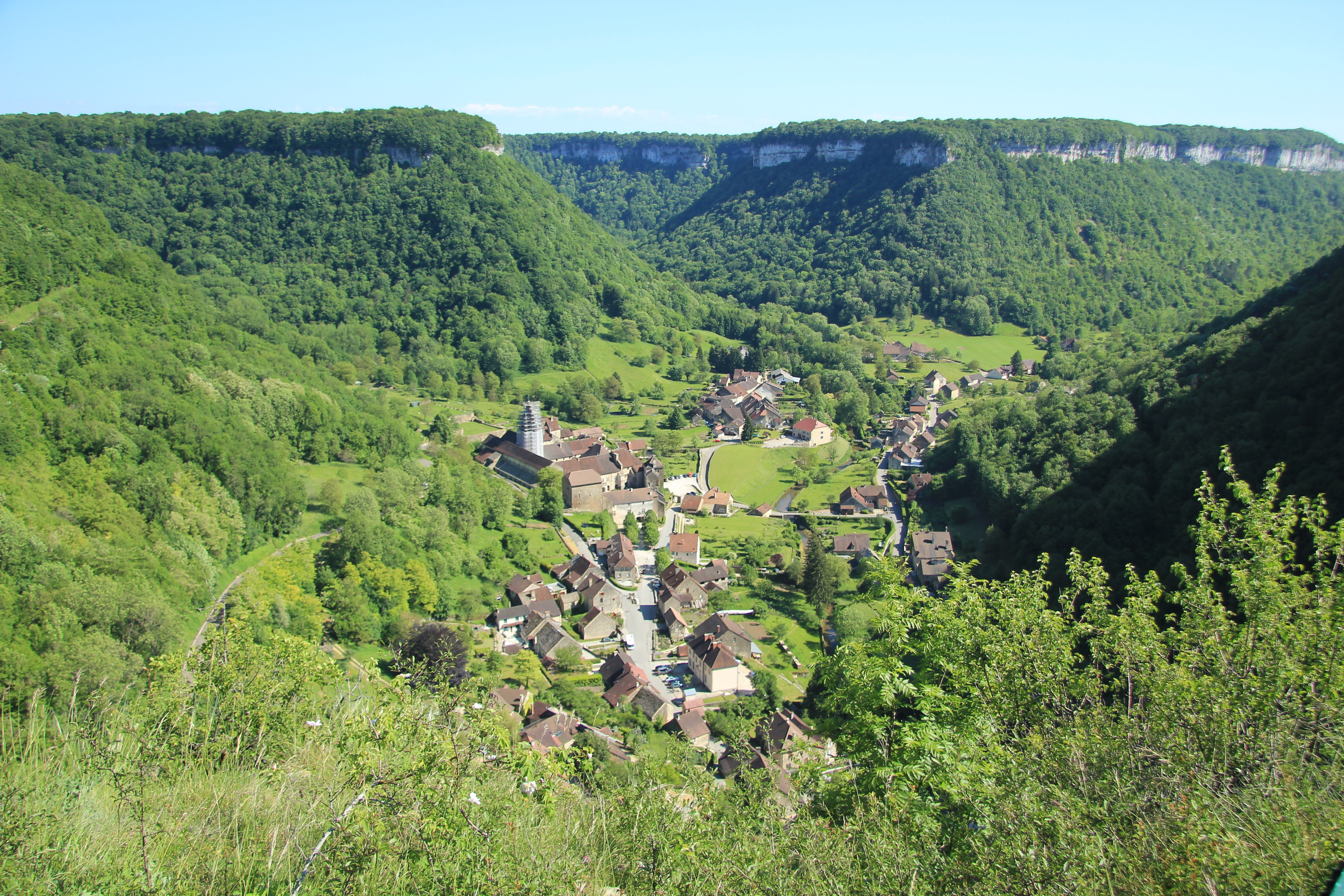
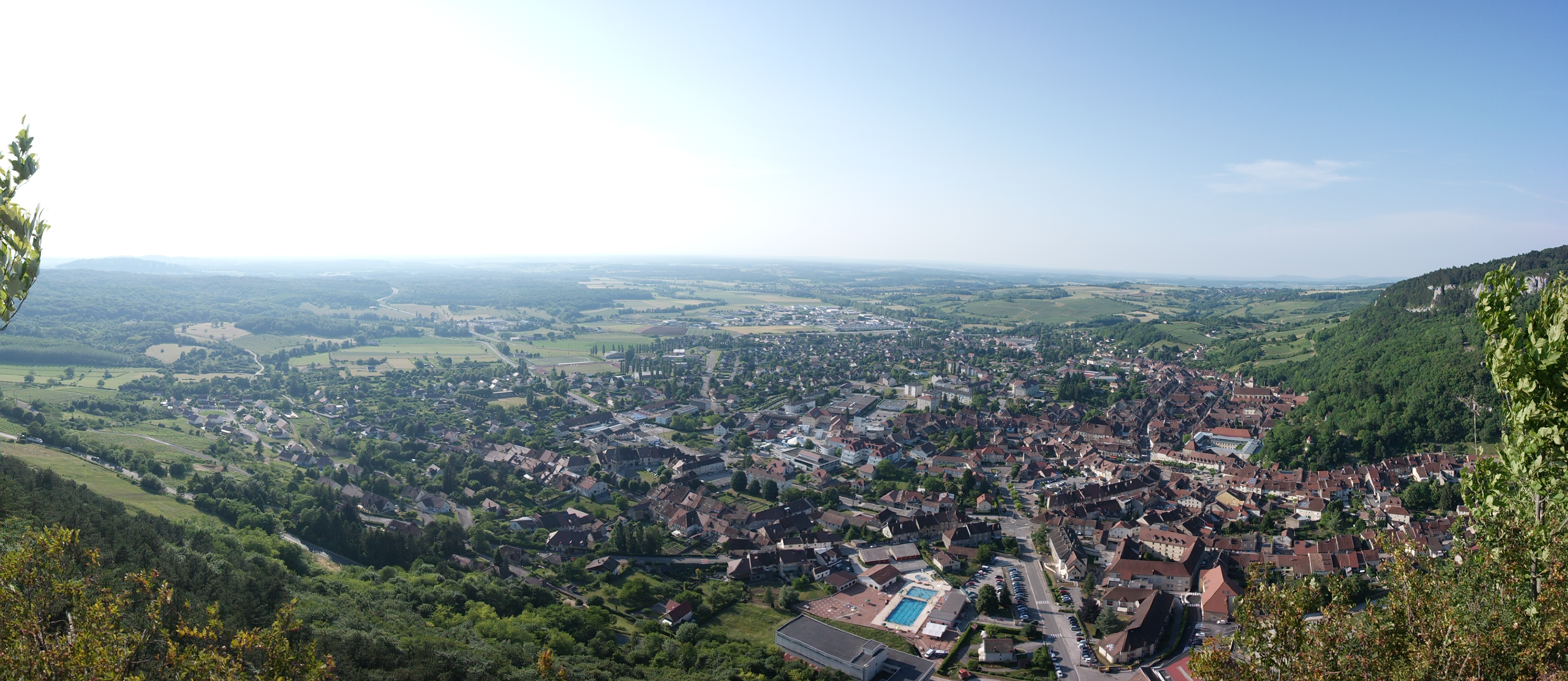
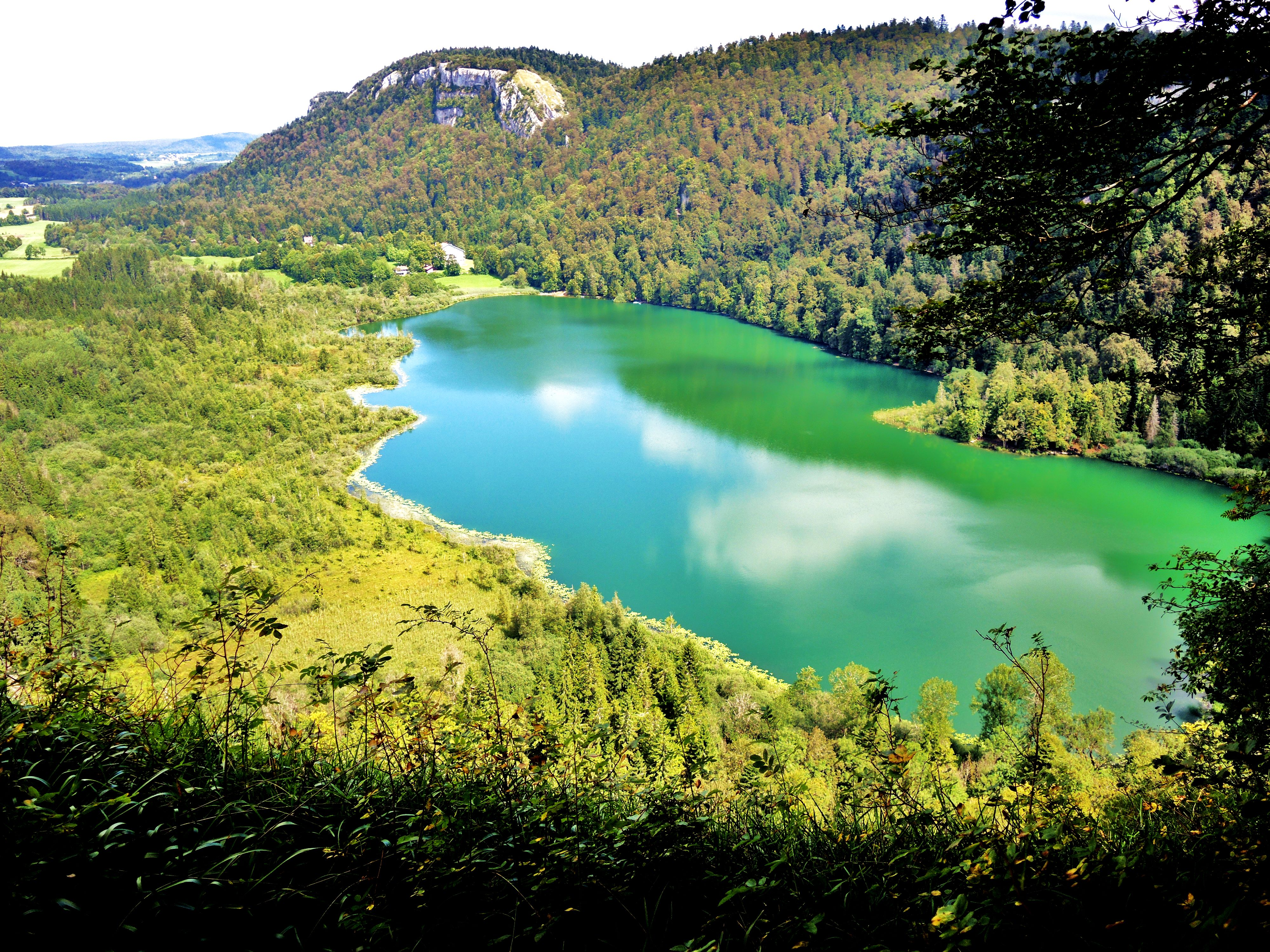
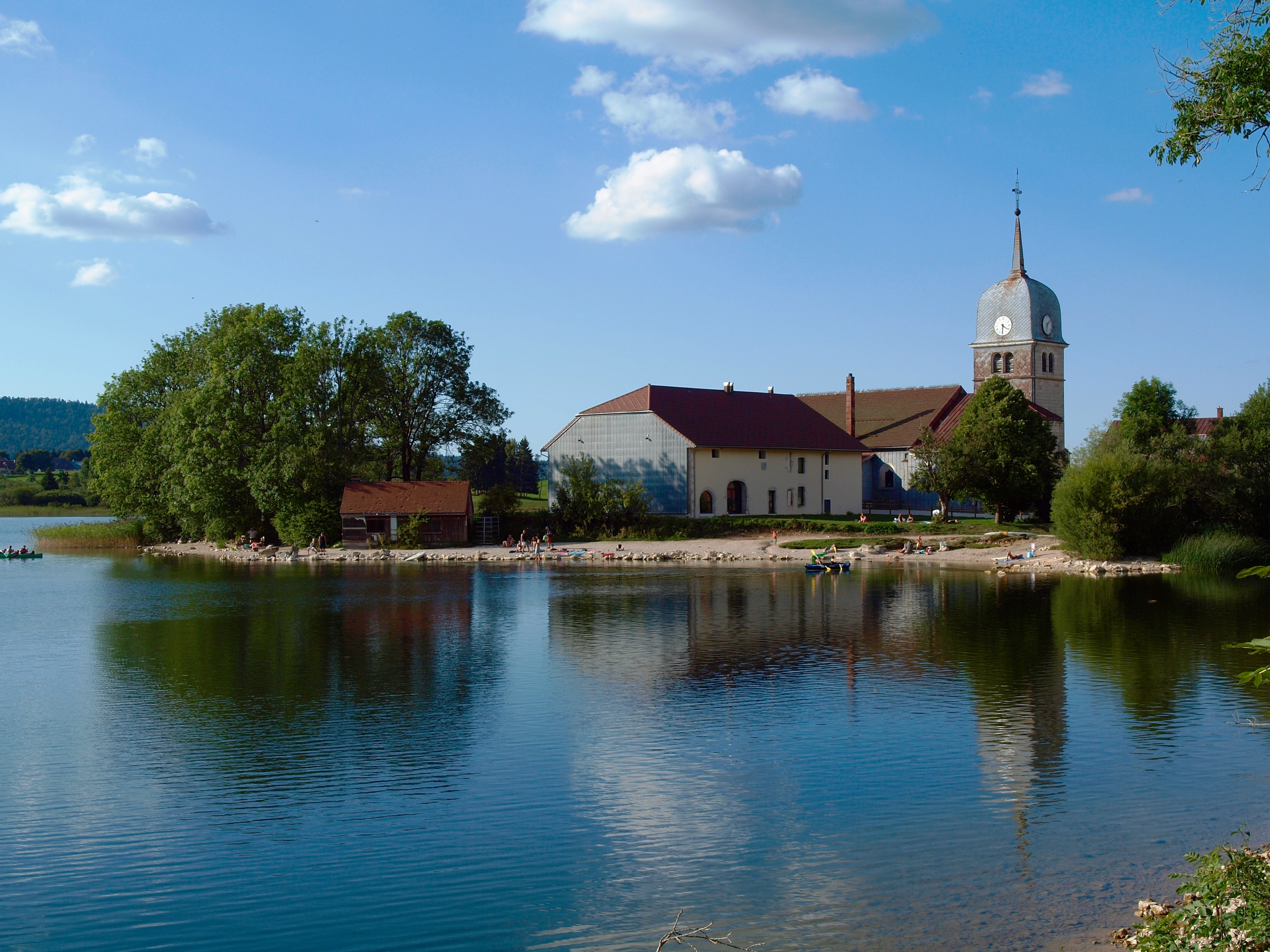
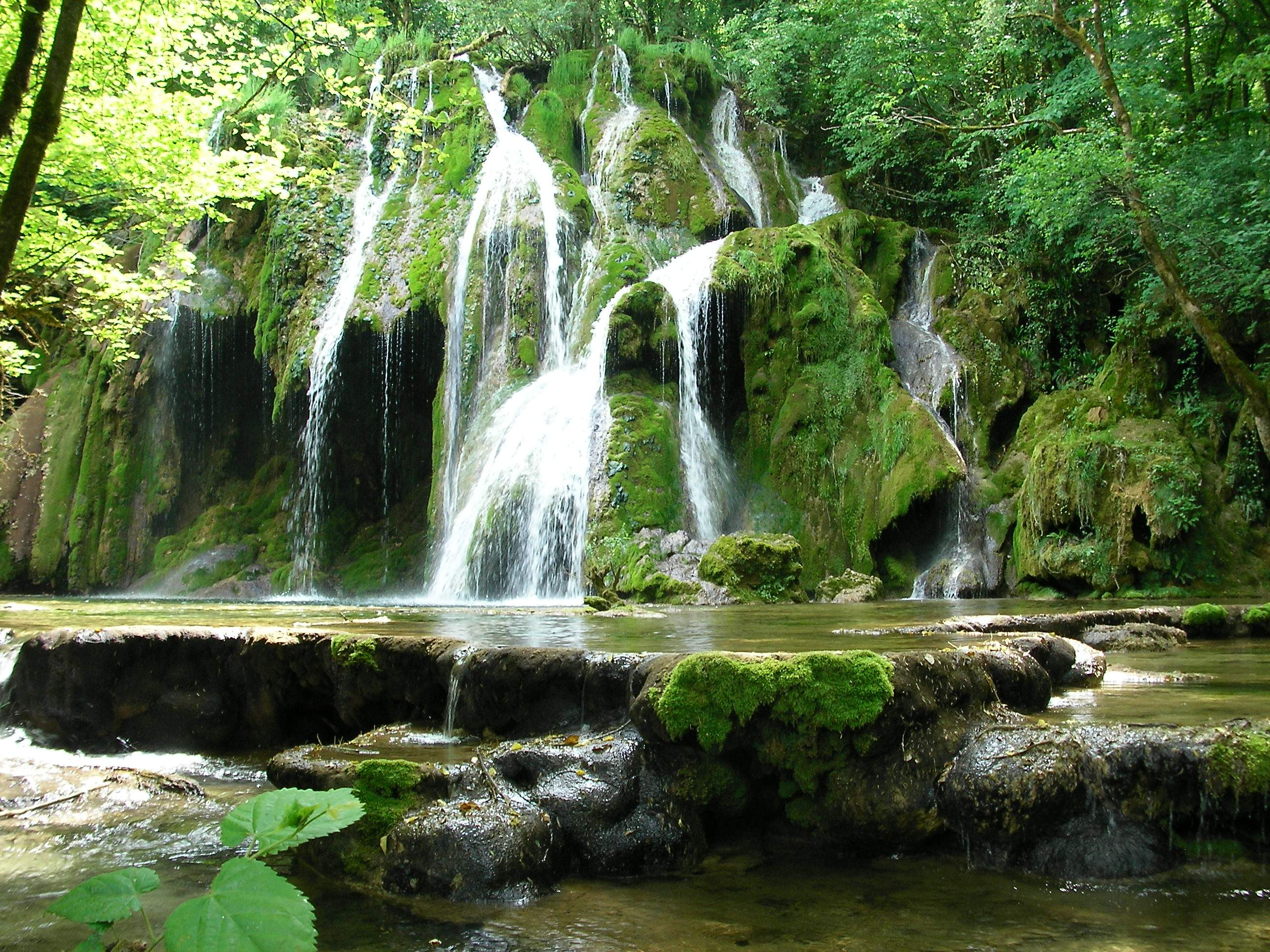
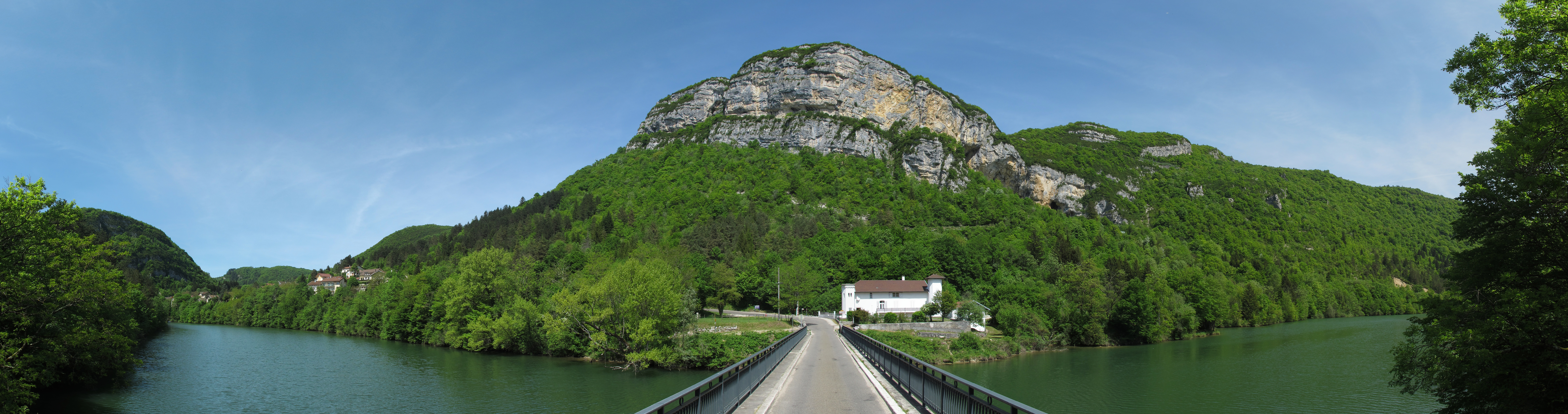
- From top down, left to right: Lac de Vouglans, Baume-les-Messieurs, Poligny, Lac de Bonlieu, Lac de l'Abbaye, Les Planches-près-Arbois, Chancia

- Flag Coat of arms

- Location of Jura in France
- Coordinates: 46°40′31″N 5°33′16″E
- Country: France
- Region: Bourgogne-Franche-Comté
- Prefecture: Lons-le-Saunier
- Subprefectures: Dole; Saint-Claude

Government
  - President of the Departmental Council: Gérôme Fassenet (LR)

Area^{1}
  - Total: 4,999 km^{2} (1,930 sq mi)
- Highest elevation: 1,200 m (3,900 ft)
- Lowest elevation: 200 m (660 ft)

Population (2023)
  - Total: 257,973
  - Rank: 83rd
  - Density: 51.60/km^{2} (133.7/sq mi)
- Time zone: UTC+1 (CET)
  - Summer (DST): UTC+2 (CEST)
- Department number: 39
- Arrondissements: 3
- Cantons: 17
- Communes: 492
- ^1 French Land Register data, which exclude estuaries and lakes, ponds and glaciers larger than 1 km^{2}

Jura (/ˈ(d)ʒʊərə/ JOOR-ə, ZHOOR-ə; French: [ʒyʁa]) is a department in the northeastern French region of Bourgogne-Franche-Comté. The department takes its name from the Jura Mountains. Its prefecture is Lons-le-Saunier; subprefectures are Dole and Saint-Claude. In 2023, Jura had a population of 257,973. It has a short portion of the border of Switzerland.

== History ==
Historically, Jura belonged to the Free County of Burgundy, known in French as the Franche-Comté. Dole was the capital until the region was conquered by Louis XIV and the capital was moved to Besançon. Dole is now a sous-préfecture, or sub-prefecture, of Jura.

As early as the 13th century, inhabitants of the southern two-thirds of Jura spoke a dialect of Arpitan language. It continued to be spoken in rural areas into the 20th century.

Jura is one of the original 83 French departments, created during the French Revolution on 4 March 1790. It was established from part of the former province of Franche-Comté. The prefecture is Lons-le-Saunier.

== Demographics ==
Population development since 1801:

Historical population

Year	Pop.	±% p.a.
1801	288,151	—
1806	300,050	+0.81%
1821	301,768	+0.04%
1831	312,504	+0.35%
1841	316,884	+0.14%
1851	313,299	−0.11%
1861	298,053	−0.50%
1872	287,634	−0.32%
1881	285,263	−0.09%
1891	273,028	−0.44%
1901	261,288	−0.44%
1911	252,713	−0.33%
1921	229,062	−0.98%
1931	229,109	+0.00%

Year	Pop.	±% p.a.
1936	220,797	−0.74%
1946	216,386	−0.20%
1954	220,202	+0.22%
1962	225,682	+0.31%
1968	233,441	+0.56%
1975	238,856	+0.33%
1982	242,925	+0.24%
1990	248,759	+0.30%
1999	250,857	+0.09%
2007	258,897	+0.40%
2012	260,932	+0.16%
2017	260,188	−0.06%
2023	257,973	−0.14%

=== Principal towns ===
The most populous commune is Dole; the prefecture Lons-le-Saunier is the second-most populous. As of 2023, there are five communes with more than 5,000 inhabitants:

Commune	Population (2023)
Dole	23,840
Lons-le-Saunier	16,618
Saint-Claude	8,386
Champagnole	8,036
Hauts de Bienne	5,032

== Geography ==
Jura is one of eight départements of the Bourgogne-Franche-Comté region and is surrounded by the French départements of Doubs, Haute-Saône, Côte-d'Or, Saône-et-Loire, and Ain, as well as the Swiss canton of Vaud on the east.

The Jura mountains are wooded and rolling, not craggy and rocky like the Alps.

Many lakes can be found throughout the Jura, the largest natural lake being Lac de Chalain, measuring 3 km long and 1 km wide. Lac de Vouglans was formed after the building of a hydro-electric dam. It is one of the largest man-made lakes in France.

- Lac de l'Abbaye
- Lac d'Antre
- Lac de Bonlieu
- Lac de Chalain
- Lac de Chambly
- Lacs de Clairvaux
- Lac de Coiselet
- Lac de Conflans
- Lac d'Etival
- Lac du Fioget
- Lac d'Ilay
- Lac de Lamoura
- Lacs du Maclu
- Lac de Narlay
- Lac d'Onoz
- Lac des Rousses
- Lac du Val
- Lac du Vernois
- Lac de Viremont
- Lac de Vouglans

== Politics ==
=== Departmental politics ===
The President of the Departmental Council has been Clément Pernot (miscellaneous right) since 2015.

Party		Seats
•	Union for a Popular Movement	15
	Socialist Party	8
	Miscellaneous left	6
	French Communist Party	3
•	Miscellaneous right	2

=== Members of the National Assembly ===
In the 2024 legislative election, Jura elected the following representatives to the National Assembly:

Constituency	Member	Party
Jura's 1st constituency	Danielle Brulebois	La République En Marche!
Jura's 2nd constituency	Marie-Christine Dalloz	The Republicans
Jura's 3rd constituency	Justine Gruet	The Republicans

== Climate ==
The climate of the Jura varies greatly by elevation. The lower valleys are temperate and pleasant, but the high mountain valleys have bitterly cold winters.

== Economy ==
Jura is a wine-growing region. The Jura wines are very distinctive and unusual wines, such as vin jaune, which is made by a similar process to sherry, developing under a flor of yeast. This is made from the local Savagnin grape variety. Other grape varieties include Poulsard, Trousseau, and Chardonnay.

The département contains no industrial cities: the few towns function as administrative and commercial centres serving Jura's rural economy. In the absence of large-scale industrial enterprises, small artisanal businesses play an important role. The Jura CFA (Centre for apprenticeship and training) recently recorded 752 current apprenticeships in trades such as building, baking, butchery, hair dressing, car repairing, sales and other non-factory based occupations.

== Tourism ==
The Jura mountains provide ample opportunities for hiking, skiing, as well as other winter sports.

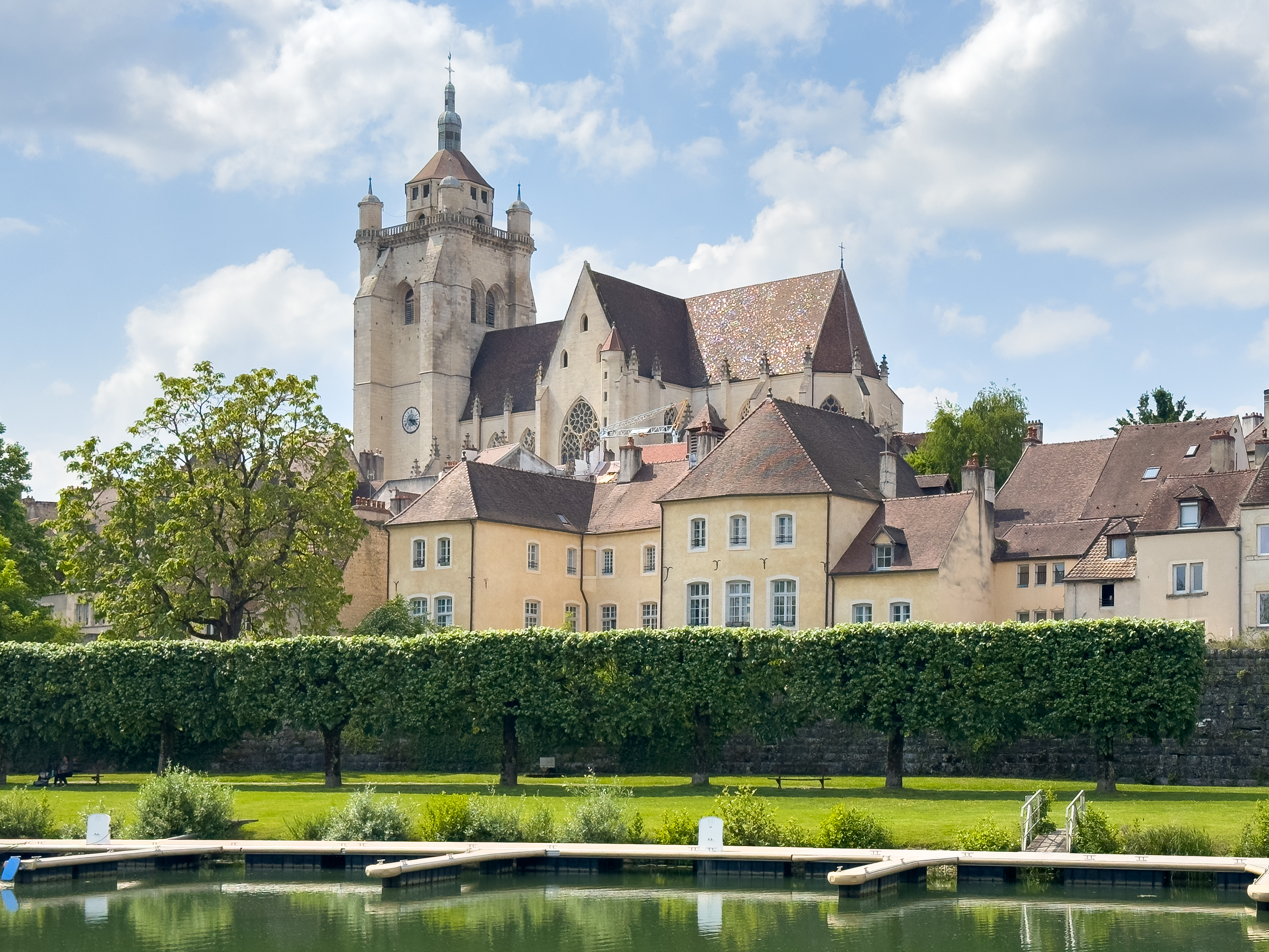
Dole

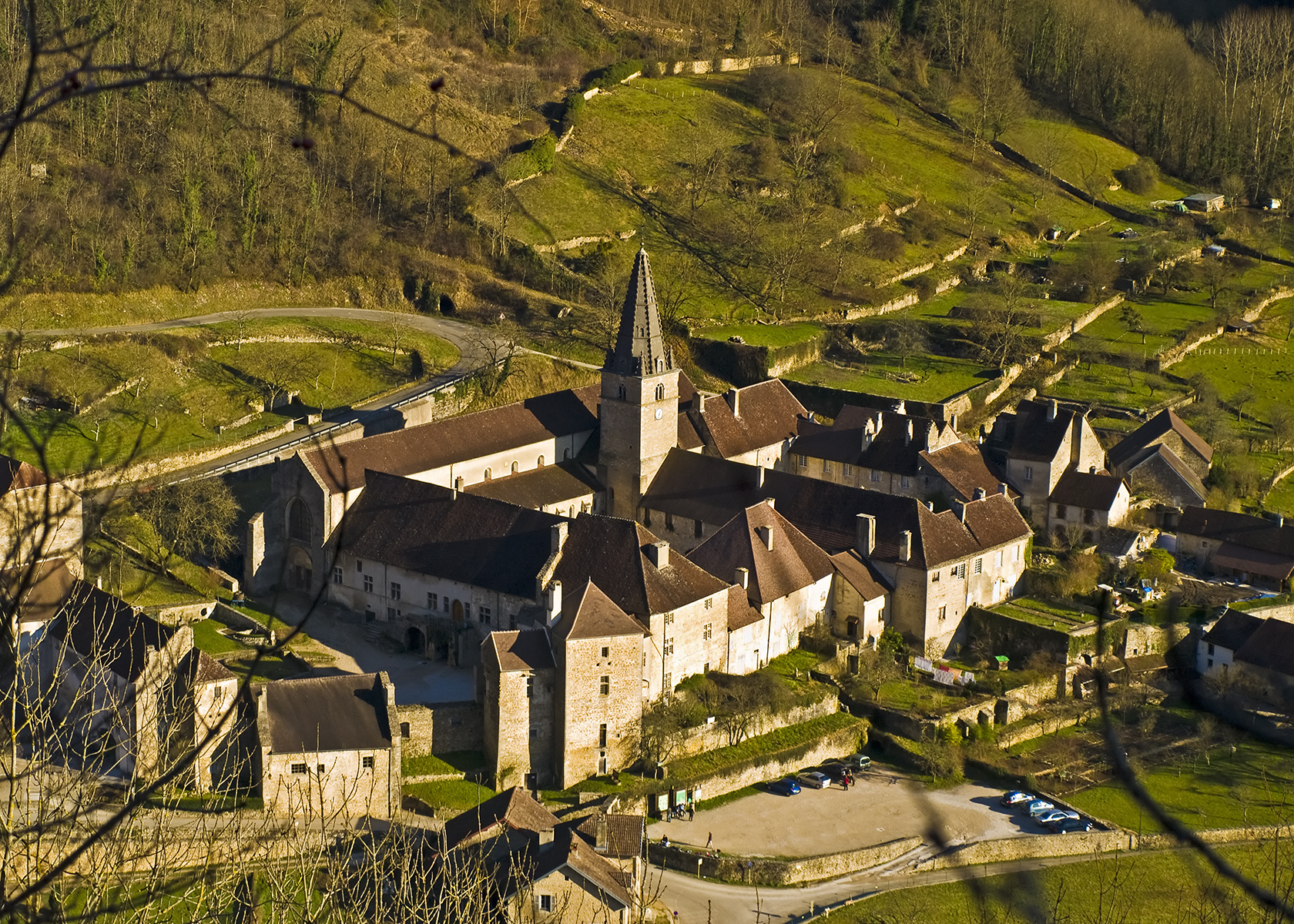
Baume Abbey

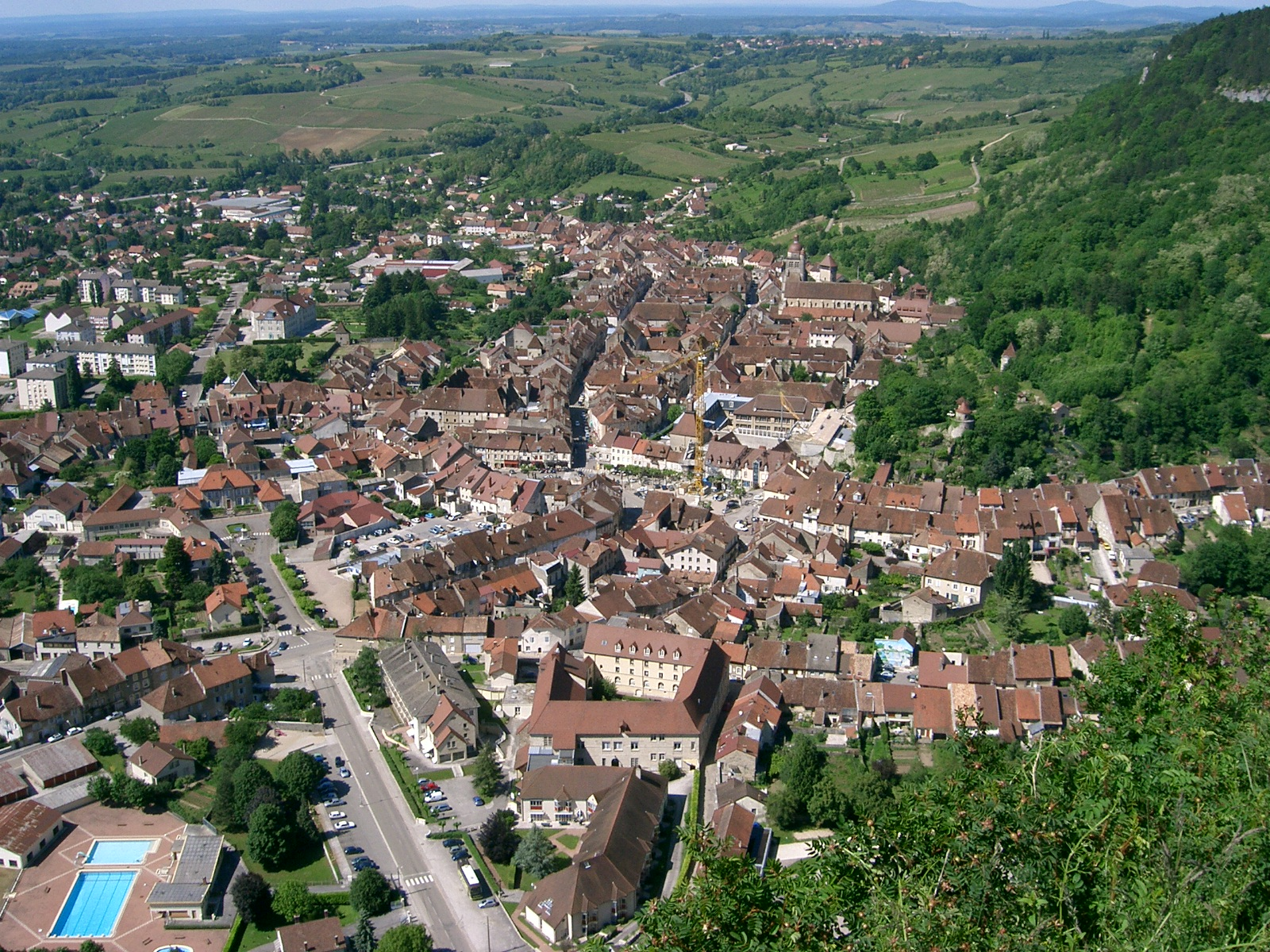
Poligny

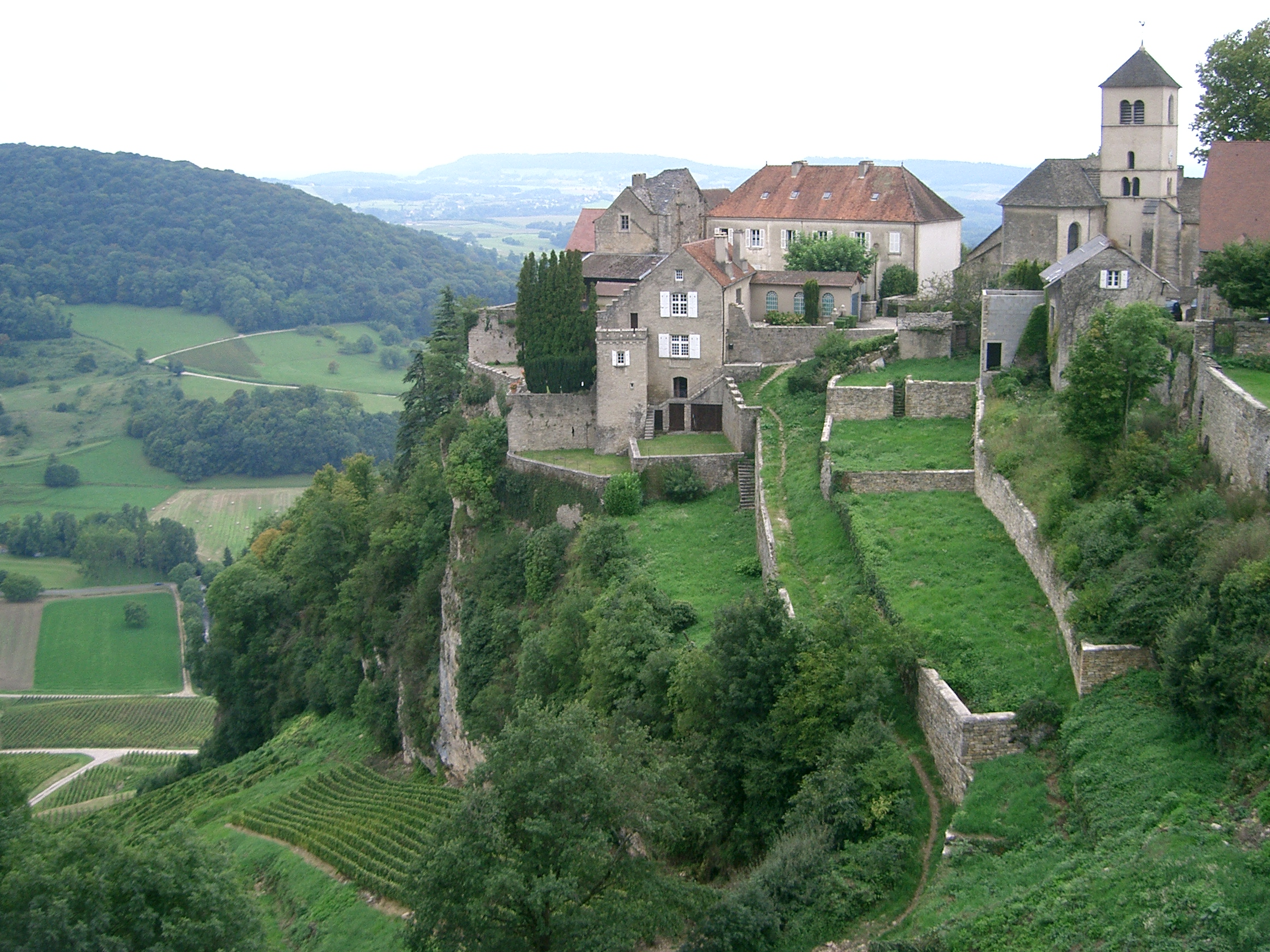
Château-Chalon

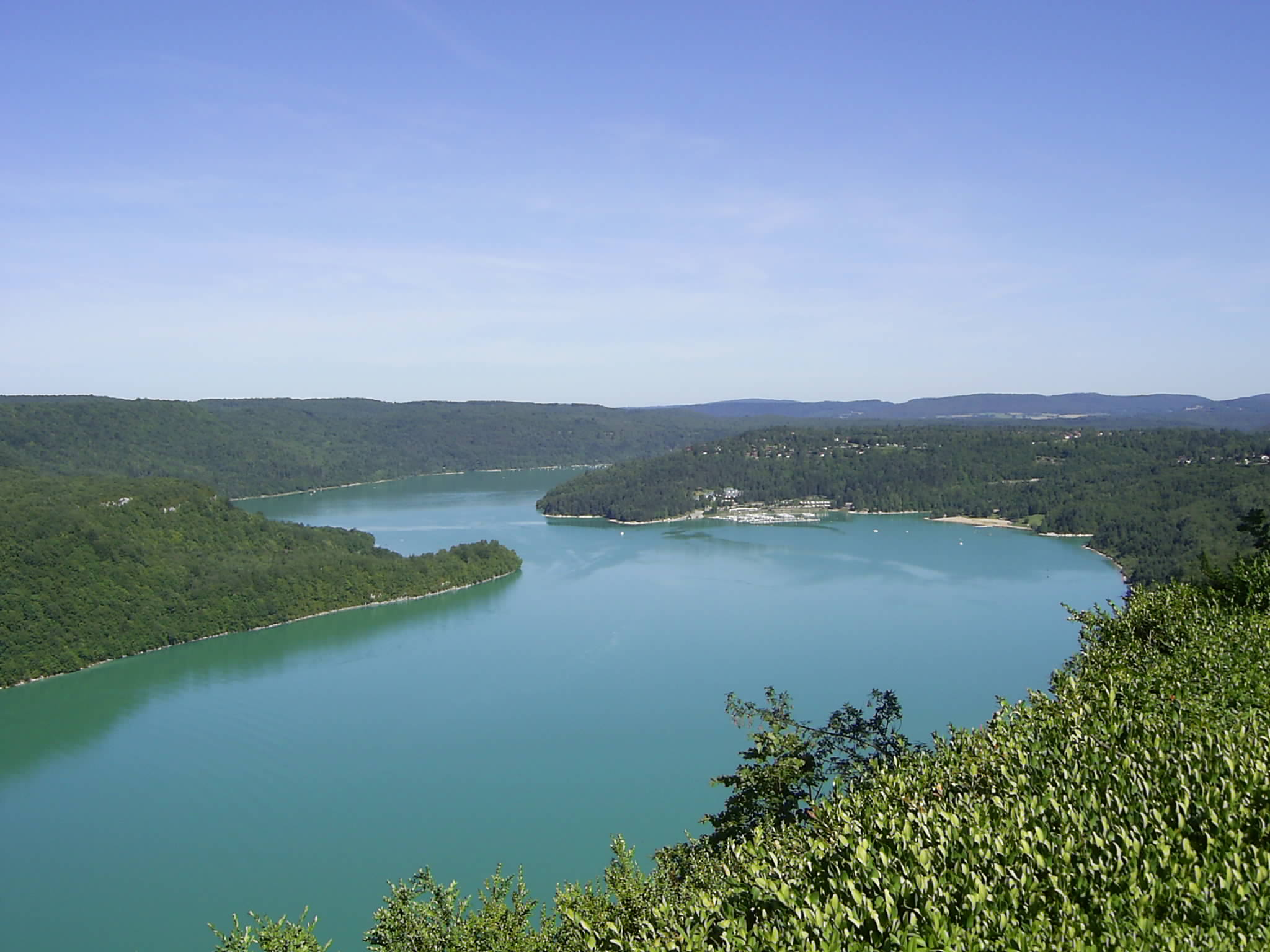
Lac de Vouglans

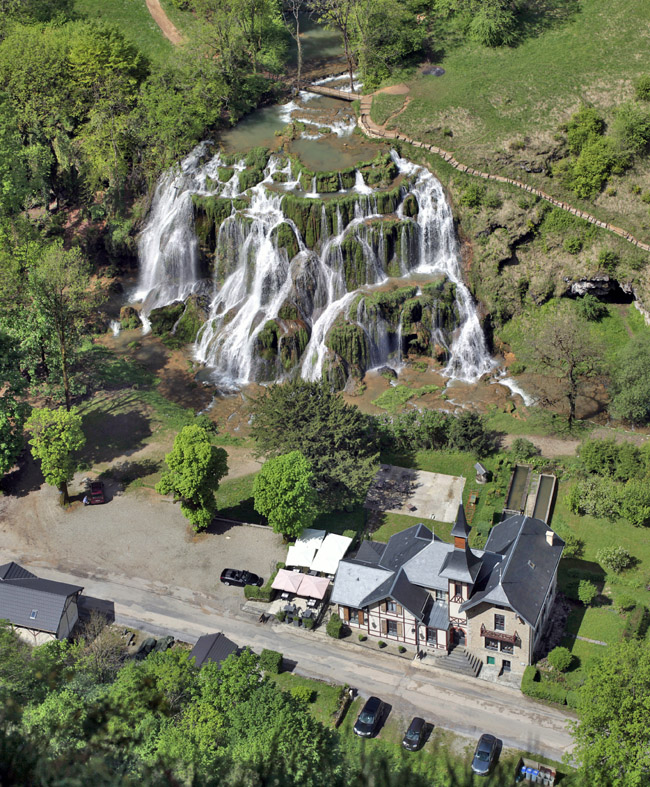
Baume-les-Messieurs

== See also ==
- Cantons of the Jura department
- Communes of the Jura department
- Arrondissements of the Jura department
- Jura wine
