= Legendary horses in the Jura =

Mythological horses in Switzerland and France

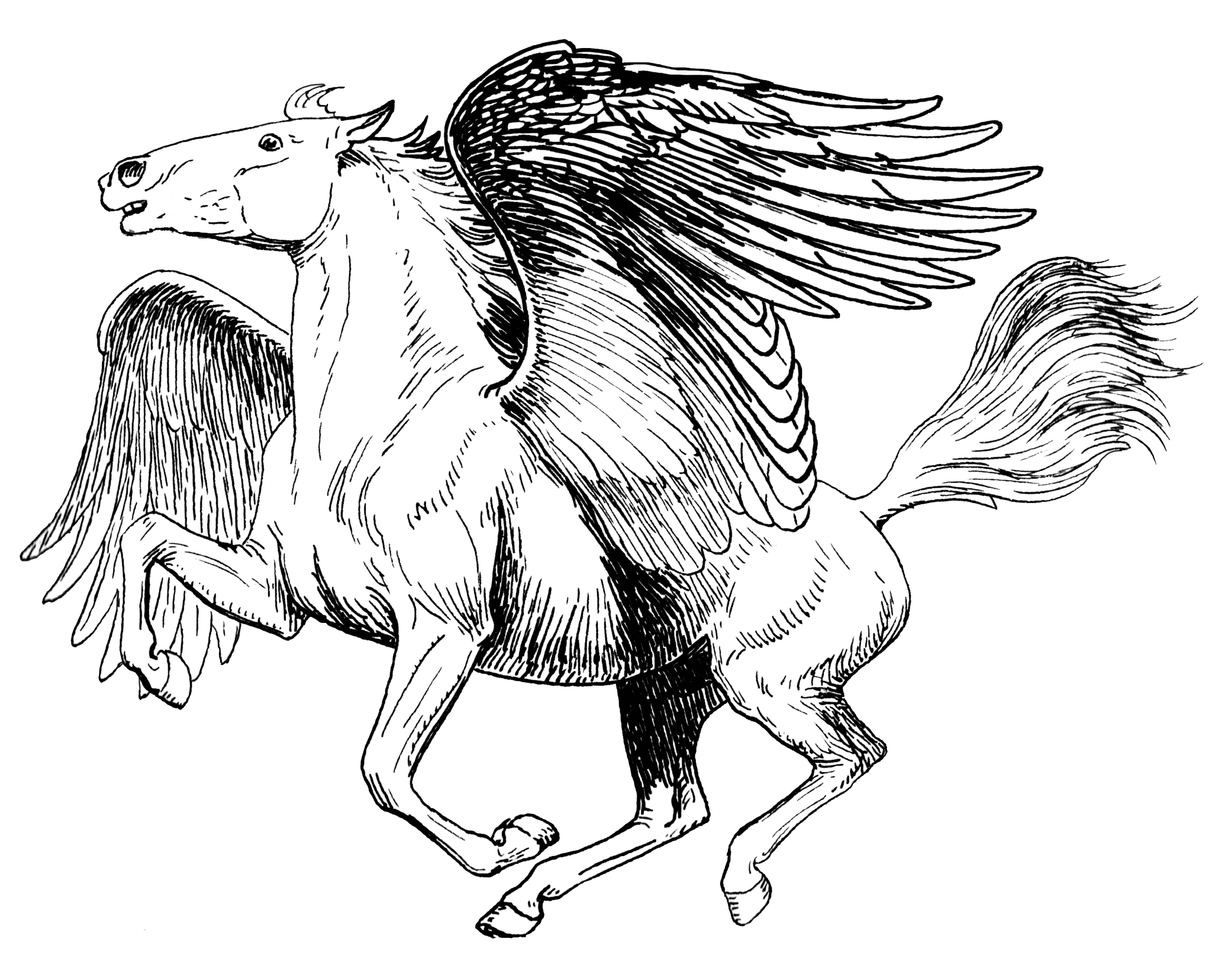
A white winged horse that is mentioned in Chisséria and Foncine-le-Haut legends

Several legendary horses are mentioned in the Jura Mountains. They are mainly white and winged horses walking near springs, flying to the top of the mountains, or frolicking in the Jura forests. There is also mention of headless horses, three-legged horses, or dangerous mounts that drown humans tempted to ride them in the Loue. These animals can be ridden during a wild hunt or simply block a passage, even playing tricks on those who ride them or kill them.

Their legends were mainly registered by Désiré Monnier at the beginning of the 19th century and included in various works devoted to folklore over time, such as Jacques-Paul Migne regarding popular beliefs, the Manuel de folklore français contemporain by Arnold van Gennep, Le folklore de France by Paul Sébillot, and Gabriel Gravier's work on the legends of Franche-Comté.

Désiré Monnier and Gabriel Gravier see various origins for these legends, those of the white and winged horses seem to be ancient and stem from Celtic tradition, Roman mythology, Pegasus from Greek mythology, or even a tutelary genius of the Huns whose memory would have been sowed in the region. The Gauvin horse and the headless horses seem to be more recent and intended to scare children.

== Legends ==
=== First collections ===
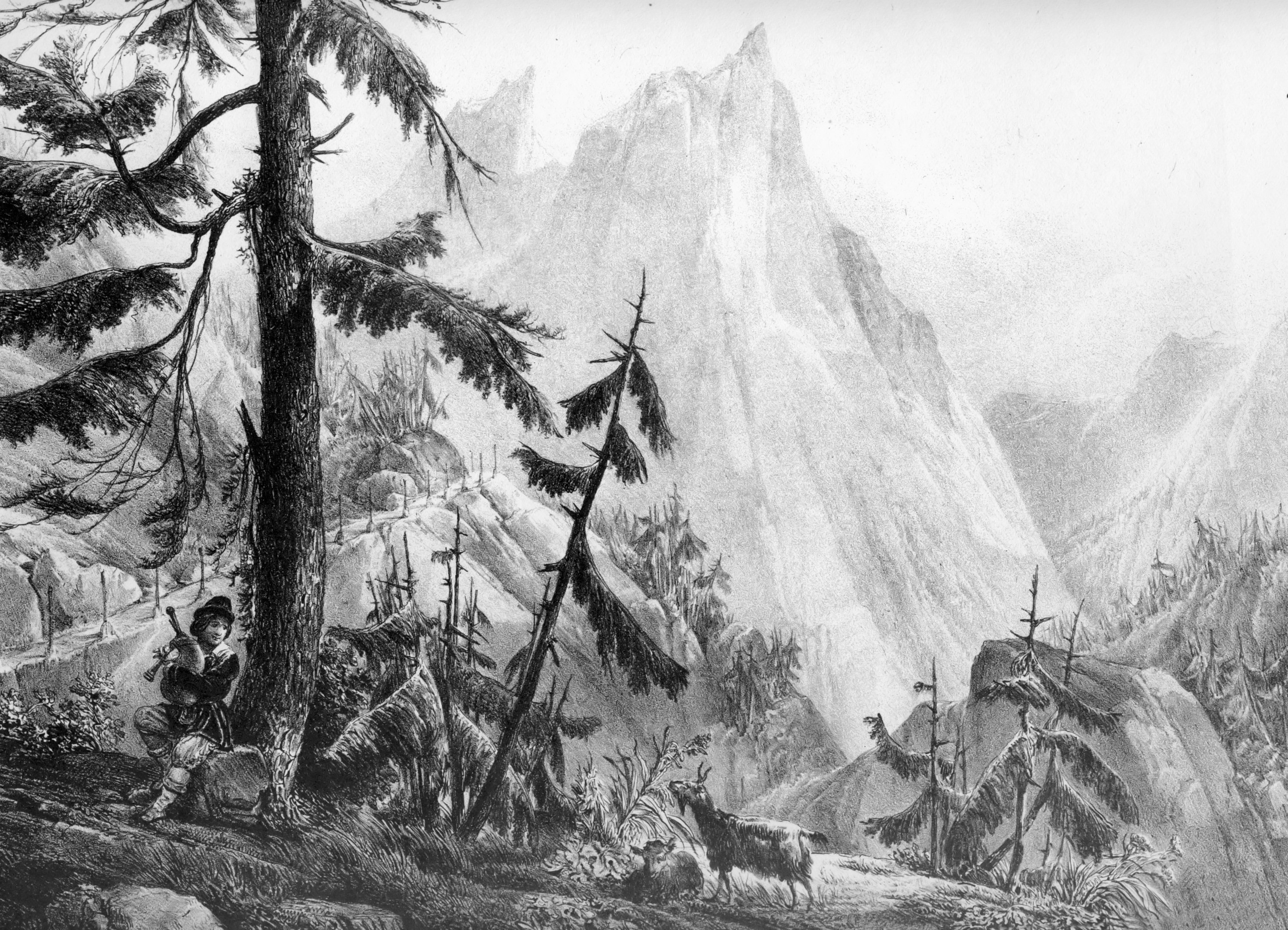
The Jura Mountains viewed from the Voyages pittoresques et romantiques dans l'ancienne France, 1826

All these legends were registered by Désiré Monnier during the first half of the 19th century. They appear in his work devoted to comparative popular traditions, published in 1854. In 1908 the Revue des traditions populaires stated that "the White Horse resembled the ordinary horse, but could cross the air, cross space and raze the earth with the speed of a bird". In general, it is noted that fantastic animals have only the appearance of corporeal beings. It is attributed to them, as to the spirits, the faculty to cross all the bodies and to move with the speed of the thought. Their forms are "extraordinary, bizarre, incoherent". Sometimes those who say they have seen them never want to say anything about their form. In Franche-Comté, most of the fantastic animals are quadrupeds, more rarely birds, reptiles, or beings that are half fish and half reptiles.

=== The white horse of Chisséria or Pegasus of Segomo ===
The white horse of Chisséria is from the Canton of Arinthod, where there are many legends about sylphs. This horse is known as Pegasus of Segomo as well. It appeared in the air in the form of a white horse, sometimes along with wispy spirits, sylphs, or ridden by an armed hunter who then roamed the sky. The township is known for its ancient cults to deities presiding over the hunt, but there is no information as to who its horseman is.

The village of Chisséria is also famous for many other legends:

"The inhabitant of Chisséria does not have to display to the eyes of the curious, like that of the valley of Vogna, a menhir, a sacred enclosure, a bust of a priestess, Gallic and Roman medals, but he will seduce them with his wonderful legends. He will show them dracks appearing in the air in the form of a white horse, annoying damsels frolicking in the moonlight on the banks of the ponds, the guivre with the sparkling carbuncle, flying from the tower of Dramelay to that of Montcroissant, werewolves, sorcerers running to the Sabbath, mounted on spindles. He will make them hear the voice of the hospitable genius hidden under the ruins of Montcroissant, who invites all passers-by to come and taste the generous wine buried for centuries in the cellars of this old castle".

— Alphonse Rousset and Frédéric Moreau, 1854

=== The white horse of Foncine or Pegasus of Foncine ===
The white horse of Foncine, or Pegasus of Foncine, is a marvelous winged white horse, specific to Foncine-le-Haut, Foncine-le-Bas, and Les Planches, which formed a single community until 1790. Numerous testimonies are noted in the region at the beginning of the 19th century: the horse appears more often at dusk, "the hour of all the marvelous apparitions". Many shepherds affirm to have had the pleasure to see "this elegant white steed" grazing at the sources of the Saine, near the barn of the Doye, then flying away with "an admirable lightness" towards the top of the sacred mountain, which invaded them with an indefinable emotion. The mayor of Foncine-le-Haut himself attests that this horse was very well known in his time: "Doctor Hunier, former mayor of Foncine-le-Haut, who, to tell the truth, does not flatter himself to have a more piercing sight than the shepherds of his commune, at least attests that the white horse is of public notoriety".

The spring near which it appears is sacred and has been reputed to have healing properties against fever since Celtic times. A legend tells that a girl fell one day into the abyss where the waters of the Saine spring, never to appear again. It could be a nymph, or a fairy condemned by Christianity to never show herself to her worshippers again.

=== The horses of Cosges ===
Two remarkably similar horses are mentioned by the inhabitants of Cosges, in the Canton of Bletterans and the plains that extend to the west of the Jura. Their sky is crossed by an aerial hunter who presses the flanks of a winged horse. They have also witnessed a "marvelous phenomenon": a "white horse, without a head, sometimes falls on their territory. If it takes the fancy of some foolhardy person to step over it, he is immediately carried off into space by this singular steed and never appears again.

These horses can be found in the toponymy of the village: the lieu-dit "au Pied du Cheval" seems to be linked to legendary apparitions.

=== The horses of Relans ===
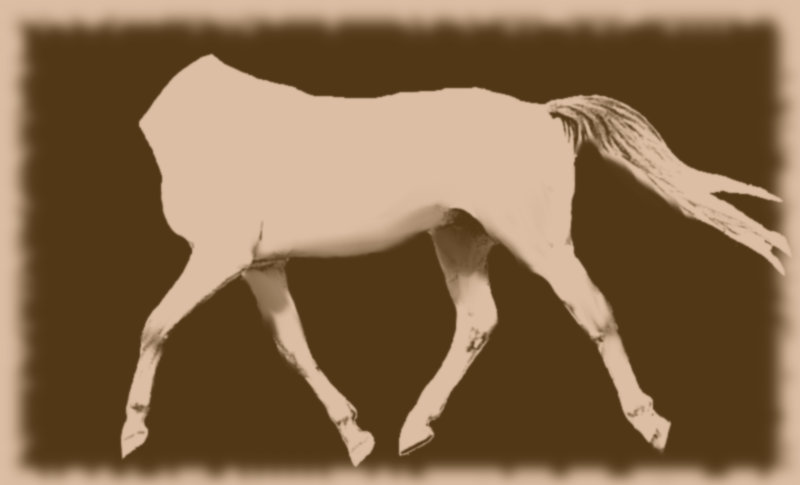
Headless white horse

Relans is considered a "fairy-tale village". A dictionary of the communes of the Jura mentions Relans as "the fairyland par excellence" in 1837, pointing out that "the whole history of Relans is composed of legends". One could see "the luminous trace of a brilliant chariot, harnessed to four white horses, which, on a certain day of the year, split the space, carrying in the air a magnificent hunter accompanied by his pack barking at the top of his voice and his brilliant squires blowing their horns".

Another headless horse used to live in this area: it was also white, and seemed to have been given the task of guarding the entrance to a path that entered the Commenailles woods because it was always at this point that it was encountered. Most of the time, he would gallop over the traveler, and throwing him on his back, he would drop him off in the fields or in the middle of the woods. At other times, he would arrive noiselessly behind the passer-by and put his front feet on his shoulders. It seems that this horse disappeared "in the revolutionary turmoil, a turmoil that took away so many other things".

In addition to its horses, Relans is famous for its white ladies who "frolic on the causeway of the pond of Folie", for a black goat that circles the pond of Gaberie with a candle between its horns, for the "agile and elusive black hen" visible at the edge of the pond of Basse, and at the bottom of the Mare-Rouge, for the silvery sound of two bells thrown at full flight to announce the midnight hour at Christmas.

=== The sylph horseman of Bonlieu ===
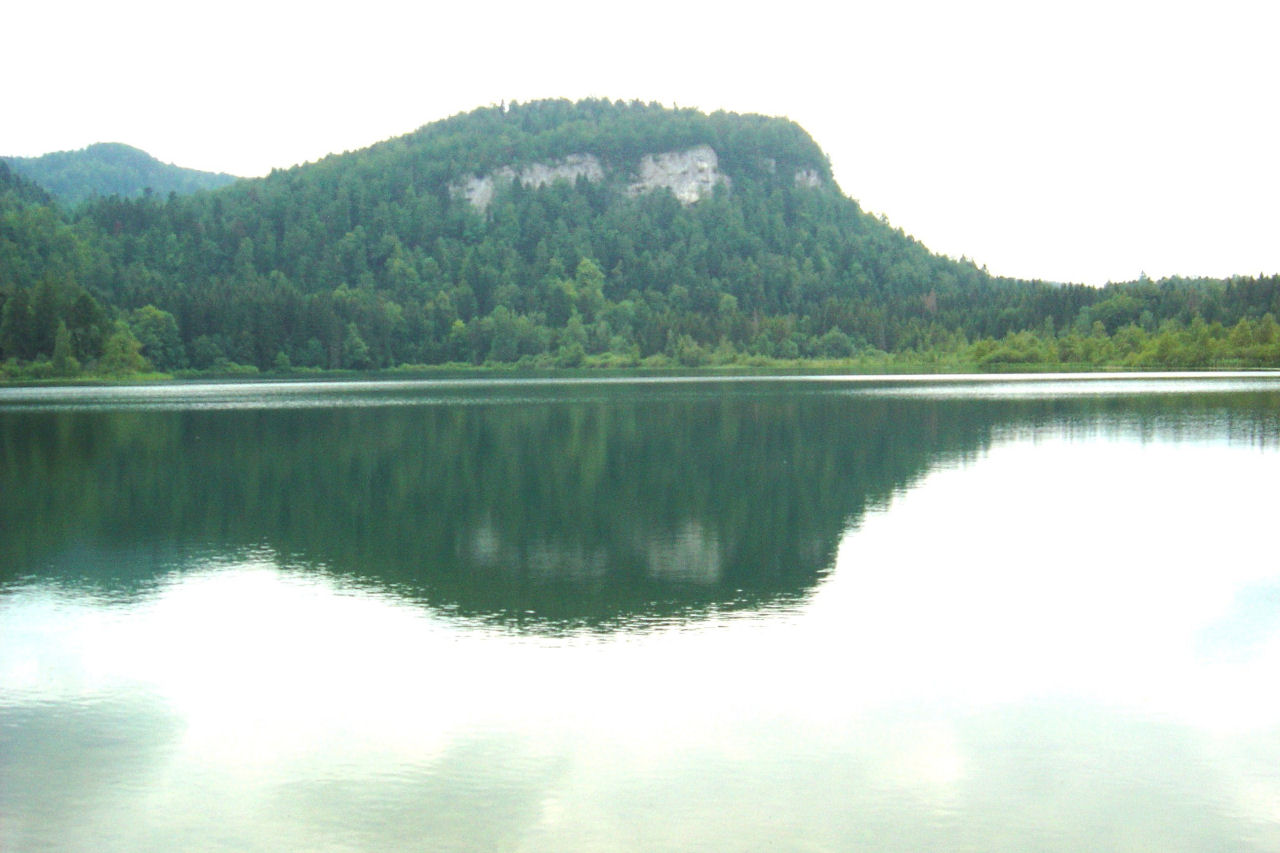
Lake of Bonlieu view, where the shylp horseman is

The horseman sylph is described as a king holding a raised saber, mounted on a white, winged, and superbly harnessed horse. He travels the skies, caracoling in "the mountains bristling with black fir trees" near the lakes of the Haut- Jura, such as those of Bonlieu and Narlay. It is said to be an aerial spirit, of which the local mountain dwellers say that it is the wight of a former lord of the Eagle.

Some observers report having seen the horseman of Bonlieu booted, armed and helmeted, riding in the air on his white pony to fall down in the plain without touching it and to leave as quickly as lightning. Others saw his horse alone, tied by the bridle to the steep rock of Magney like a rack. He was outside the rock, in the air, his hair bristling, his tail outstretched, waiting impatiently for his master to come and step over him so that he could start his races across the sky again as soon as possible. He sometimes rested in the forest of La Chaux-du-Dombief.

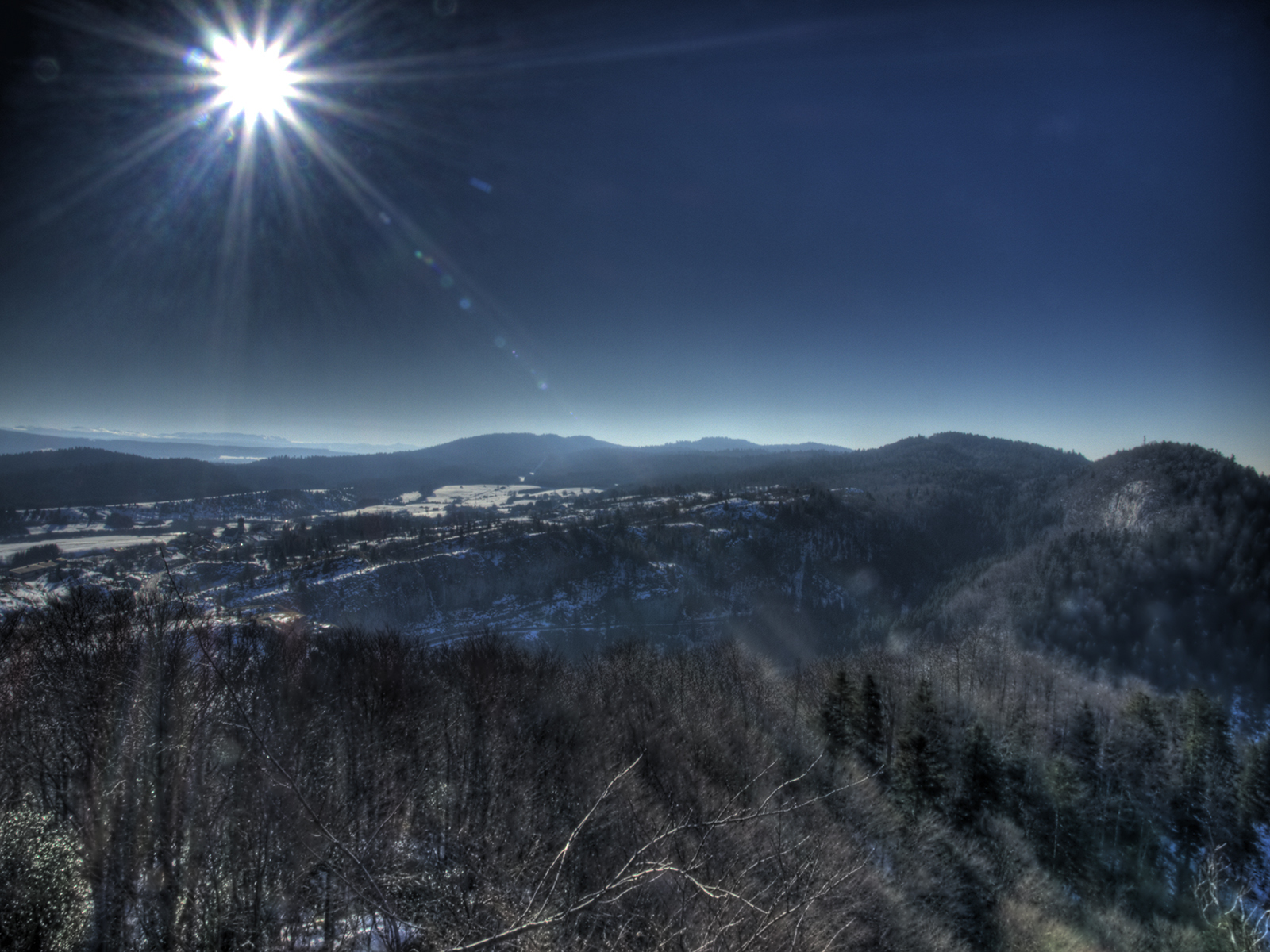
View of La Chaux-du-Dombief after the Pic de l'Aigle, where the sylph horseman has been seen

At the time the legend was recorded, in the first half of the 19th century, old men reported that in their younger years, they were looking for a book written by "le Merlin du pays" who had "deposited in it the secret of interesting the sylph in his favor". They report that many people, "in a hurry to reach their destination or interested in escaping the pursuit of suspicious people" have invoked it successfully. However, the horseman sylph is also said to have aided smuggling on many occasions. It is also said that he supports loving hearts separated by too much distance and that he is good enough to receive in his rump a young lover to whom the night would not be long enough to spend it on a journey and alone with his beautiful; provided, of course, that he is well persuaded of the purity of such loves. He was reputed to be serious and even sad and did not amuse himself at the expense of morals and family tranquility. He is a dark and unhappy hero, sometimes on horseback and sometimes on foot.

In 1864, Paule Méré evoked the Jura and its legends in the Revue des Deux Mondes:

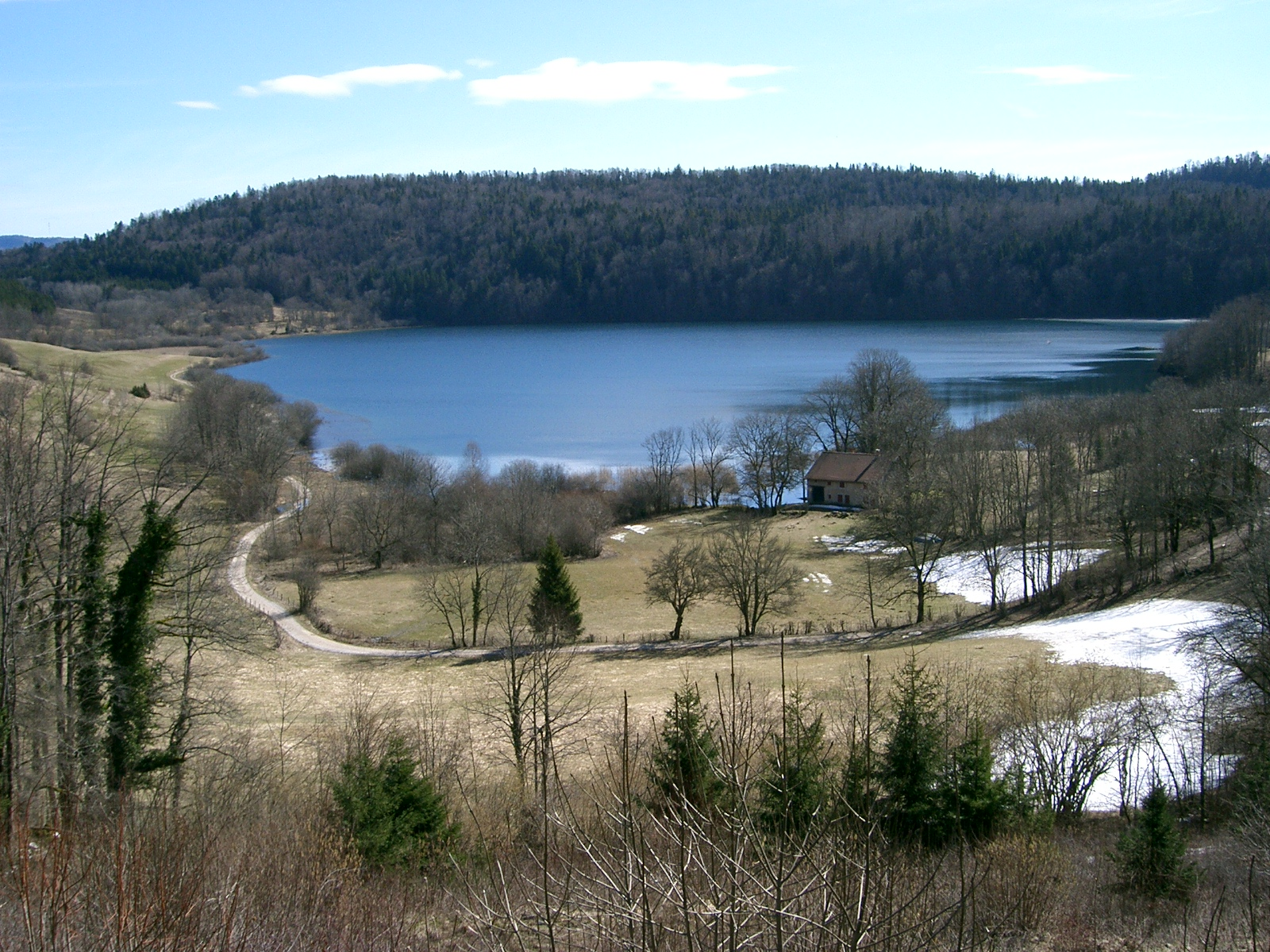
View of the Narlay Lake, other place where the sylph horseman is.

"Dark woods, green pastures, steep and angular crests where the plants that the sun and the goshawks delight, marly combes that the spring gentian cherishes, brownish or chalky cliffs, rocky cirques, narrow cluses enclosed between grey walls, abrupt summits that the horseman sylph and the spirit of the stones inhabit, nants where a bubbling water precipitates, clear brooks which at three steps of their source disappear in chasms, transparent lakes with the naked shores bordered of fir trees, stony slopes where the red viper crawls, peat bogs where sleep yellowish mosses and stunted shrubs, swamps decorated with horsetails and bulrushes, mounts and valleys, ravines and meadows, barren fields, patient labor of man and oxen to overcome the refusals of the earth, white houses scattered on the heights, humble dwellings covered with shingles whose inhabitants work with iron and wood to make up for the indigence of a stingy soil, wandering herds, deep silences, cawing of the crow, half-veiled sky of the long afternoons, grayish vapors trailing on the side of the mountains, clearings that the evening wind fills with its boredom, serene royalty of the moon at the hour of mystery when it takes possession of the old astonished forests".

— Paule Méré, Revue des deux Mondes

=== Three-legged horse ===
This three-legged horse comes from the Doubs department, as it lives in the woods of Nancray, in the middle mountains overlooking Besançon, but also frequents a few other places. The lightness of the three-legged would have "nothing to equal it among the Cossacks and the Bedouins". It is said that the skilful squire who managed to restrain him would do with this strange animal whatever he pleased. But once three-legged is freed from it, it is forever; he escapes like a dash and goes to find, in the depths of the woods, his natural gait and the days of his freedom.

=== The Gauvin horse ===
The Gauvin horse seems to be the most famous, this evil animal is common to the whole region of Franche-Comté and the Swiss Jura, where it rides along the rivers and tries to kill anyone who rides it. In the French department of Jura, the Gauvin horse is known to frequent the Loue Valley and the Forest of Chaux, where it used to kidnap young girls.

Désiré Monnier tells that a woman from Chamblay once passed by the village cemetery at night, where the Gauvin horse appeared:

"This woman, well known for her adventurous and resolute character, having seen this beautiful beast grazing, which did not seem to belong to anyone she knew, approached it, flattered it with her hand, found it docile and kind: she, therefore, thought she could straddle it to bring it to her stable. When the fairy horse felt her on its back, it gave his rider a slight idea of his merit, by doing countless evolutions on the beach near the port. Everything went perfectly; the chambléisienne was delighted with her find; she galloped without jerking, she flew as if with wings, so much and so well that she forgot herself in these delicious exercises of equestrianism. She had never seen herself so strong in this way. Suddenly, by a sudden return of fortune, her noble pony finally made her understand that she had entrusted herself to it in the wrong way: the steed rushed into the Loue as if it wanted to give her a last proof of its talent; and, when it arrived in the middle of the river, it disappeared under her and let her fall into the deepest current. She only saved herself from this drowning in a miraculous way, which has not been recounted; but it is known that she died in 1836, and we are now persuaded that it was as a result of her fright."

— Désiré Monnier, Traditions populaires comparées

In the middle of the 19th century, its tradition was still alive in Montbarrey and it was said to have shown itself several times to the inhabitants near Gillabois. This horse was supposed to leave its unknown lair at midnight and gallop through the villages. The elders of the village, who did not boast of having seen it, assured in 1839 that they were very afraid of it in their youth. Children in Montbarrey, Joux, and Dole were told about the Gauvin horse.

=== The drack ===
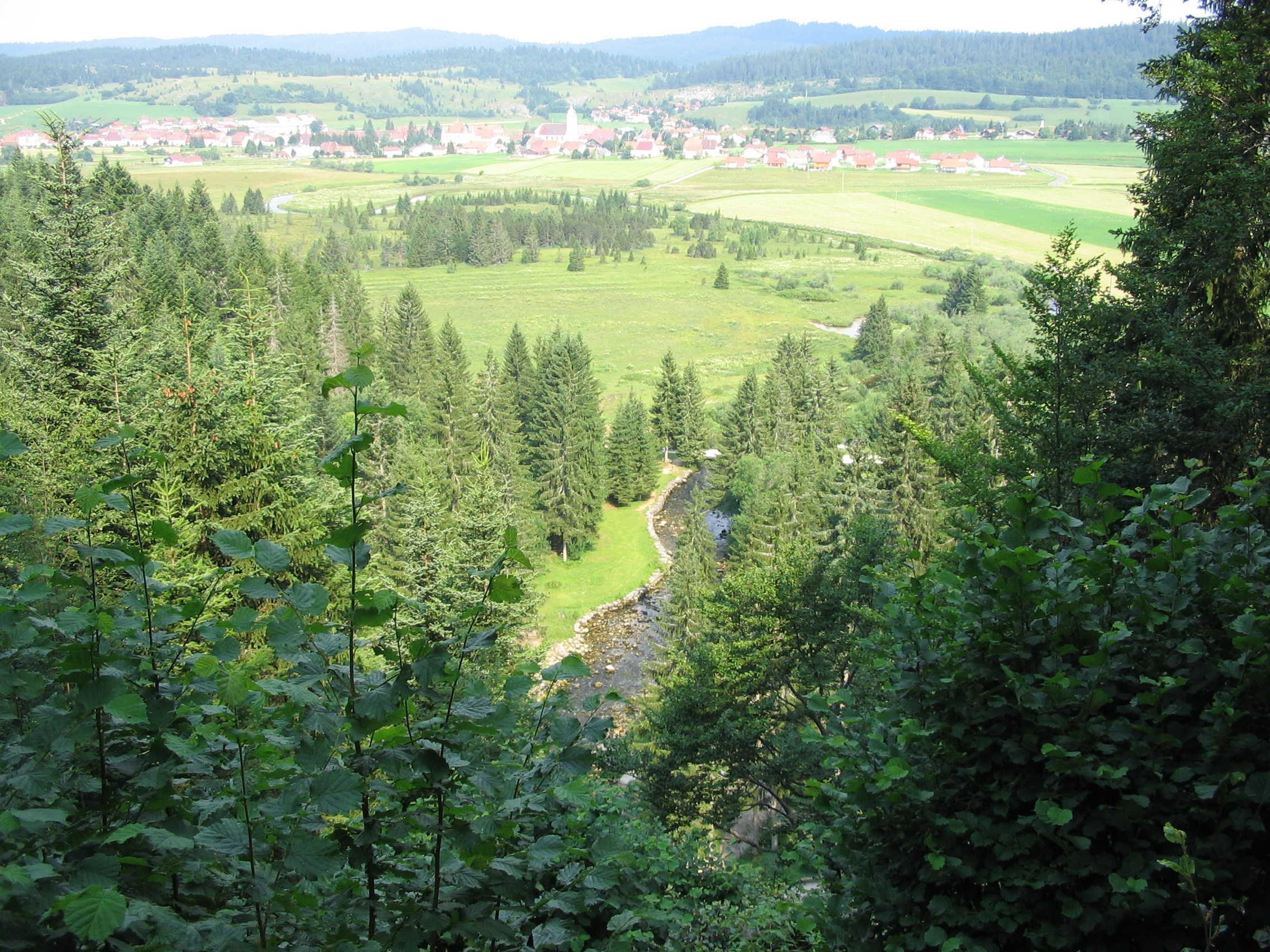
The Doubs River at Mouthe, a place where the drack rages according to the legend

The drack seems to be frequently confused with the creatures mentioned above. According to the Society of Popular Traditions, it is a species of white quadruped resembling a horse (usually) without a head, but very light and very fast in its course. It is possible that its name derives from the radical of "dragon". There are several versions of the Jura legends where the white horse is identified as being in fact a drack. The drack is described as harmless in Vernantois, where it spends its time grazing near the Moirons mill. At l'Étoile, he carries off travelers lingering in the sky. At the farm of Champvent-du-Milieu, near Mouthe, he brings the farmer back from the fairs of the neighboring village. In Cosges, he carries travelers and those of Chisséria would often see him passing. In Tavaux, he wanders on the road and seizes unfortunate pedestrians that he will drown in the Doubs. It is in Commenailles that he is best known since the headless horse that comes noiselessly from behind the travelers and puts its two front legs on their shoulders would be a drack. He then loads them on his back and carries them belly down into the woods from where they have great difficulty in getting out. It is a monster considered dangerous at the beginning of the 20th century, since in the neighboring villages, especially in Relans, the old men give the people instructions to avoid the presence of the drack which, it is said, guards the entrance to the wood.

== Origin and symbolism ==
Geographic location of legendary horses of the Jura

In 1854, Désiré Monnier saw several possible origins in these legends, according to him, stemming from Celtic, Greek, or Tartar influences. He notes that the iconography of the white horses of the Jura resembles that which the Hindus painted in one of their sacred pictures to represent the tenth incarnation of Vishnu, when this god, who is often represented on horseback, will come mounted on Kalki.

The work of comparison carried out by Monnier and Émile Vingtrinier was heavily criticized by M. Bourquelot of the École des Chartes, in 1857, who accused them of having simply noted similarities, without proving the origin of the legends.

In 1904, Paul Sébillot noted that all the Franc-Comtois fantasy horses were closely linked to the forest. In 1980 Gabriel Gravier emphasized the fact that the Jura region, which is mountainous, is far from most of the major roads. Alternately occupied by the Celts, Gallo-Romans, Burgundians, and Alamans who brought with them their beliefs, it remained globally attached to its ancient legends.

On the other hand, Désiré Monnier sees the headless horses and the Gauvin horse as "scarecrows that are used to prevent children from running around in the evening", and states that they were probably invented for this purpose.

=== Celtic origin ===
Désiré Monnier notes that the two villages of Foncine (Foncine-le-Haut and Foncine-le-Bas) "abound in ancient and curious traditions and customs", Christianity has supplanted most of the pagan cults, but many vestiges remain, which is also confirmed by the architect Frédéric Moreau, regarding the many traces of religious practices linked to the Druidic cult in the region.

According to Gabriel Gravier, in 1980, the Jura white horse is a Gallic tradition that has been Frenchified. He notes that the Saine is etymologically linked to Druidism and the Sequanis, priestesses who cured ailments, and diseases, and predicted the future. Celtic sustenance in the Jura concerns Christmas and the tradition of kissing under the mistletoe, the public almsgiving on New Year's Day near the Cheverie bridge, or the druidic monuments. The costume worn by the men and women of Foncine "imitated, until a few years ago, with a singular accuracy, that of the ancient Celts, as described by Strabo".

In 1855, a collection mentions another "horseman sylph" linked to the Jura legend of Switzerland, mounted on a black horse that does not fly. It is attributed to a Celtic origin:

"... dwarves or fairies had been heard mowing with great noise during the summer nights in the meadow of the Lady, under the forest at Donzel, at the very foot of the castle. Many had seen the black dog with the fiery eyes, Augenbrand, looking for his master, Count Rudolf of Sogren, who was murdered in 1233. Others had met more than once the mysterious horseman, the wild hunter, this sylph appeared in so many regions from Scythia, where it seems to have originated, to Brittany, Sevania and all the Celtic countries. In the evening, when there is only a doubtful light, he comes out of the dreaded caves of the Teufelskuchi, mounted on a small black horse and covered himself with dark clothes; his short and stocky body barely rises above the saddle and his wide-brimmed hat is so far down and close to his shoulders that one can doubt if there is a head under this headdress. He gallops in the direction of Soyhière and his speed is so great that one believes to hear the rustle of the air which he splits in his fast race, but the feet of his mount leaves no trace on the path which he traverses. The dust does not rise under his steps, and the water and mud, in times of rain, do not gush out in his path, but, on the other hand, the horses that meet him neigh in terror, and the traveler moves away from his path with terror. Why does this horseman never pass the old bridge of Sogren, the very place where the dog Augenbrand begins his nightly rounds? Why is it that only certain people have the privilege of seeing this sylph? These are questions that these very respectable and trustworthy people cannot answer. They affirm however to have seen the horseman, they quote witnesses, and however less favored than them, we see in this mysterious character only a myth, a Celtic memory, elusive like the rings of the flood".

— Société jurassienne d'émulation, "Actes"

=== Greek Mythology ===
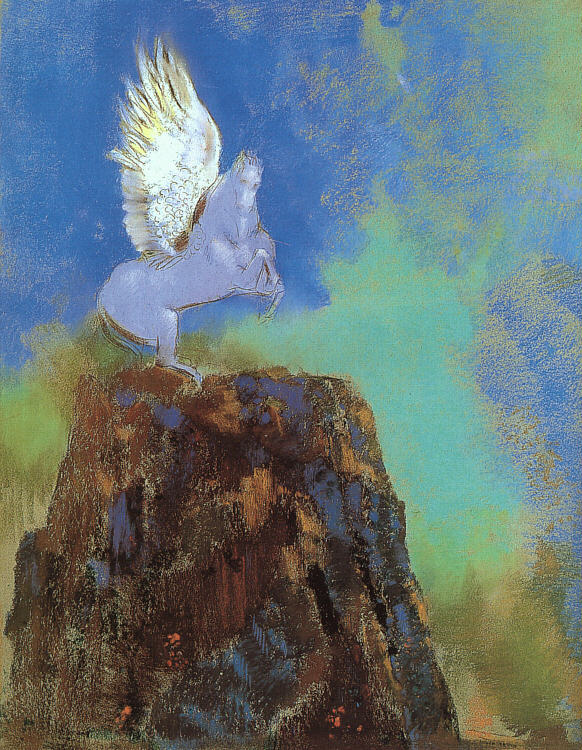
Pegasus painting made by Odilon Redon, in 1900. The winged horse is represented at the top of a mountain.

An origin evoked by Désiré Monnier for the winged and flying horses is that of Pegasus of Greek mythology, who would have "left his footprints all over the Jura region". The castle of the Jura eagle could be likened to Mount Olympus and the top of a mountain near Foncine-le-Haut to the Greek Mount Parnassus. The origin of the image of the "winged horse on top of a mountain" is, according to him, clearly linked to the myth of Pegasus. The riding sylph of Bonlieu recalls the Greek hero Bellerophon, who rode Pegasus and fell while trying to reach Olympus, and then ended up wandering on foot in the deserts, racked with worries and avoiding encounters.

=== Roman mythology ===
The white horse of Chisséria could also be the mount of the Gallo-Roman god of Arinthod, Segomo, assimilated to the Roman god Mars and to whom the Roman Paternus, son of the Gaulish Dagusa, erected an altar in Arinthod, which was replaced by a church with the Christianization. Segomo was offered sacrifices. He would be a "god of Mars and a horseman".

=== Nordic mythology ===
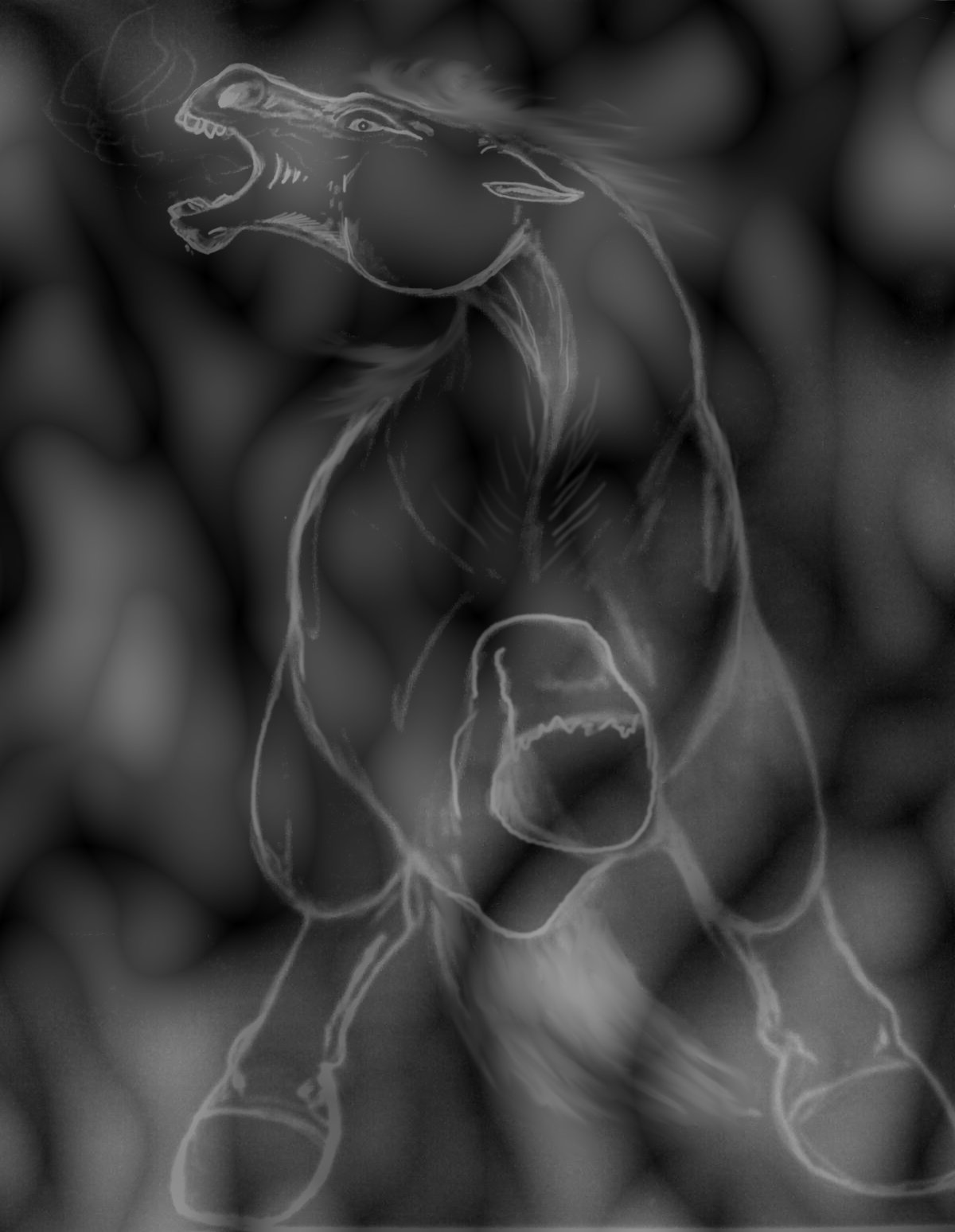
Helhest

Monnier saw in the three-legged a "childishness" and according to him, "those who made this myth are perhaps the same ones who invented the Scandinavian mythology, where one sees Héla or Death who governs the nine worlds, mounted on a three-footed horse, and sowing on the nations all the plagues". This belief is specific to the peasants of ancient Cimbri (Denmark), who mention "this three-legged horse galloping through the generations that it incessantly decimates". The dictionary of superstitions mentions the same origin, inspired by the works of the brothers Grimm, who attributed to Hel, goddess of the underworld in Norse mythology, a three-legged horse.

Moreover, another three-legged horse is mentioned in Alsatian folklore: "Among the ghost-animals of Strasbourg, the three-legged horse that roams the bridges and the banks of the Ill and that is said to be the devil, must be placed in the first place".

=== Asian influence ===
According to Désiré Monnier it is possible that Attila, who came to the West with the Huns, brought Tartar guardian spirits to the West, even to the Welsh and Bretons, where the myth of the winged horse still survives. The winged horse could have been the spirit presiding over the mountains among the Huns. The horseman sylph of Bonlieu would thus come from "the peoples who occupied Germania and who later invaded Great Britain and Gaul".

For M. Bourquelot of the École des Chartes, the resemblance can be an indication of the community of origin of a legend, but not an absolute proof, and it remains to show the process of transmission. For him, the Chinese general Guan Yu, killed with his son and who became the tutelary genius of the Manchu people, does not seem to be at the origin of the Jura legends, and the belief in the horseman sylph of Bonlieu could not come from Asia.

== See also ==
- Augenbrand
- Cheval Gauvin
- List of legendary creatures by type
- White horses in mythology
- Segomo
- Helhest
- Legendary horses of Pas-de-Calais

== Bibliography ==
- Rousset, Alphonse; Moreau, Frédéric (1837). Dictionnaire géographique, historique et statistique des communes de la Franche-Comté et des hameaux qui en dépendent, classés par département: département du Jura. Vol. 5. Besançon: Bintot.
- Société des traditions populaires (1908). Revue des traditions populaires. Vol. 23. Paris: Librairie orientale et américaine.
- Monnier, Désiré (1854). Traditions populaires comparées. J. B. Dumoulin.
- Thuriet, Charles (1877). Traditions populaires du Jura. G. Marescha.
- Alleau, René (1964). Guide de la France mystérieuse. Vol. 1. Tchou.
- Thuriet, Charles (1979). Traditions populaires de la Haute-Saône et du Jura. Laffitte.
- Rousset, Alphonse; Moreau, Frédéric (1854). Dictionnaire géographique, historique et statistique des communes de la Franche-Comté et des hameaux qui en dépendent, classés par département : département du Jura. Vol. 2. Besançon: Bintot.
- Gravier, Gabriel (1980). Franche-Comté, pays des légendes : Arrondissements de Pontarlier (Doubs), de Saint-Claude et de Lons-le-Saunier (Jura). Vol. 2. Éditions Marque-Maillard.
- Moreau, Frédéric (1855). Dictionnaire géographique, historique et statistique des communes de la Franche-Comté et des hameaux qui en dépendent, classés par département : département du Jura. Vol. 3. Bintot.
- Thevenot, Émile (1953). La nécropole de Furfooz. De Tempel.
- Société d'agriculture, sciences et arts de Poligny (1875). Bulletin. Vol. 16–17.
- Chesnel de la Charbouclais, Louis Pierre François Adolphe (1856). Dictionnaire des superstitions, erreurs, préjugés et traditions populaires. Troisième et dernière encyclopédie théologique. Vol. 20. J. P. Migne.
- Van Gennep, Arnold (1987). Manuel de folklore français contemporain : Cycle des douze jours. Vol. 7. Éditions Picard. ISBN 978-2-7084-0074-0.
- Cercle de recherche et d'animation sur les traditions populaires Franche-Comté/Europe (1989). Le drack de Vernantois et de l'Étoile. Hamadryade.
- Bourgeois, Claude (1992). Divona : Monuments et sanctuaires du culte gallo-romain de l'eau : De l'archéologie à l'histoire. Vol. 2. De Boccard.
- Collectif (1864). Revue des deux Mondes. Vol. 1864. Au Bureau de la Revue des deux Mondes.
- Sébillot, Paul (1904). Le folklore de France. Vol. 1. Librairie orientale & américaine.
- Rager, Catherine (2003). Dictionnaire des fées et du peuple invisible dans l'Occident païen. Brepols. ISBN 978-2-503-51105-4.
- Société de mythologie française (1987). Mythologie française, Numéros 144-154.
- Société de l'École des chartes (1857). Bibliothèque de l'École des chartes. Libr. d'Alphonse Picard.
- Société jurassienne d'émulation (1855). Actes. Porrentruy, V. Michel.
- Vingtrinier, Aimé (1874). Croyances et traditions populaires (2nd ed.).
- Bérenger-Féraud, Laurent Jean Baptiste (1896). Superstitions et survivances : étudiées au point de vue de leur origine et de leurs transformations. Vol. 2. E. Leroux.
