= Saine (river) =

French river

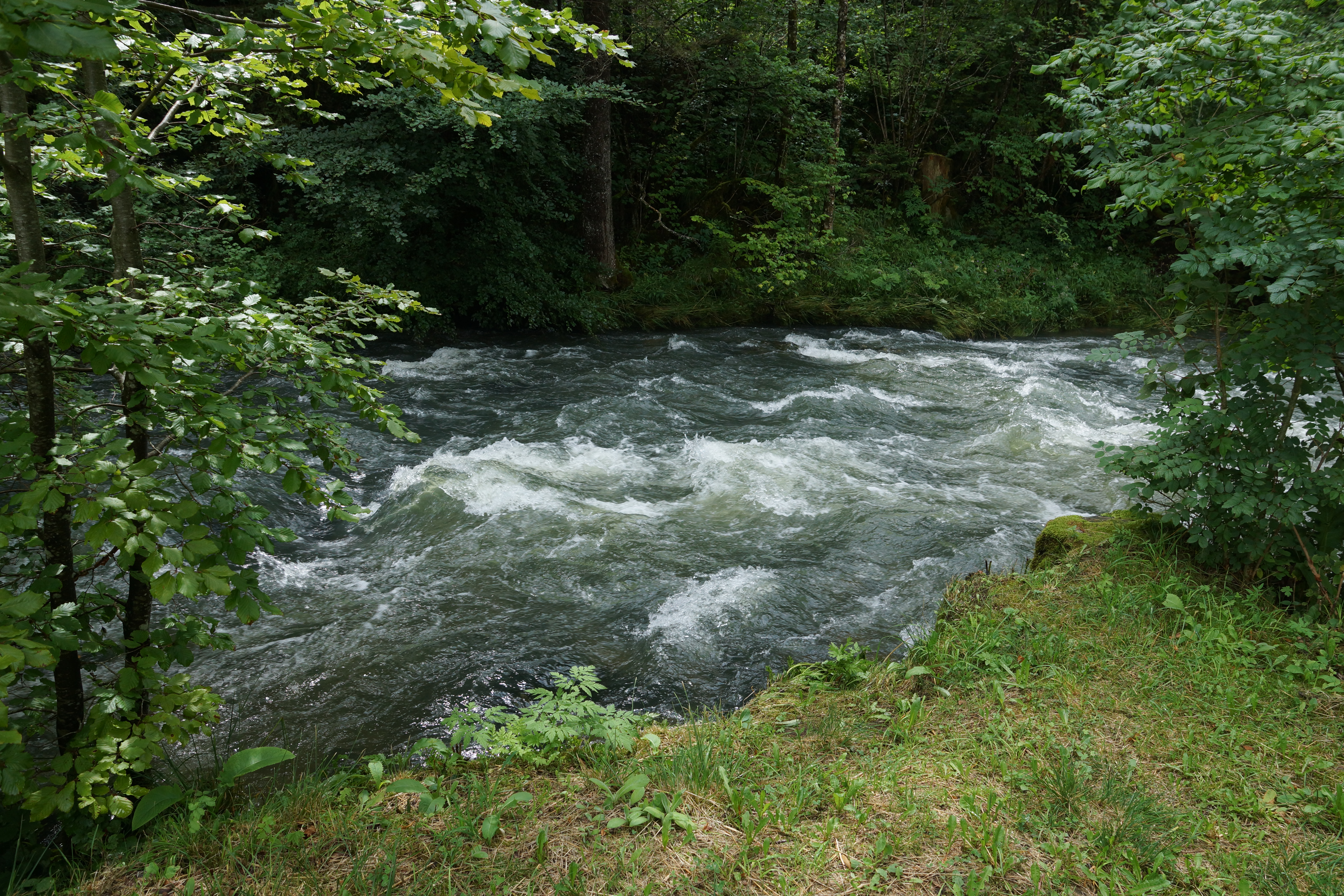
- Downstream from Foncine-le-Haut, the Saine is swollen by storm rain.

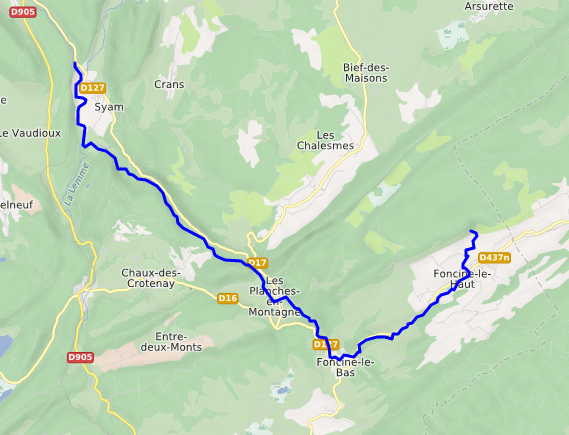
- Saine course (interactive map of the Ain basin)

Location
- Country: France
- Region: Bourgogne-Franche-Comté

Physical characteristics
- Source
  - location: Foncine-le-Haut
  - elevation: 892 m
- Mouth: Ain
  - location: Syam
  - coordinates: 46°42′34″N 5°56′22″E
- Length: 19.1 km (11.9 mi)
- Basin size: 196 km^{2}
- Discharge
  - location: Syam
  - average: 8.5 m^{3}/s

Basin features
- River system: Rhone

The Saine is a French river that flows through the Jura department in the Bourgogne-Franche-Comté region. It is a left tributary of the Ain.

== Geography ==
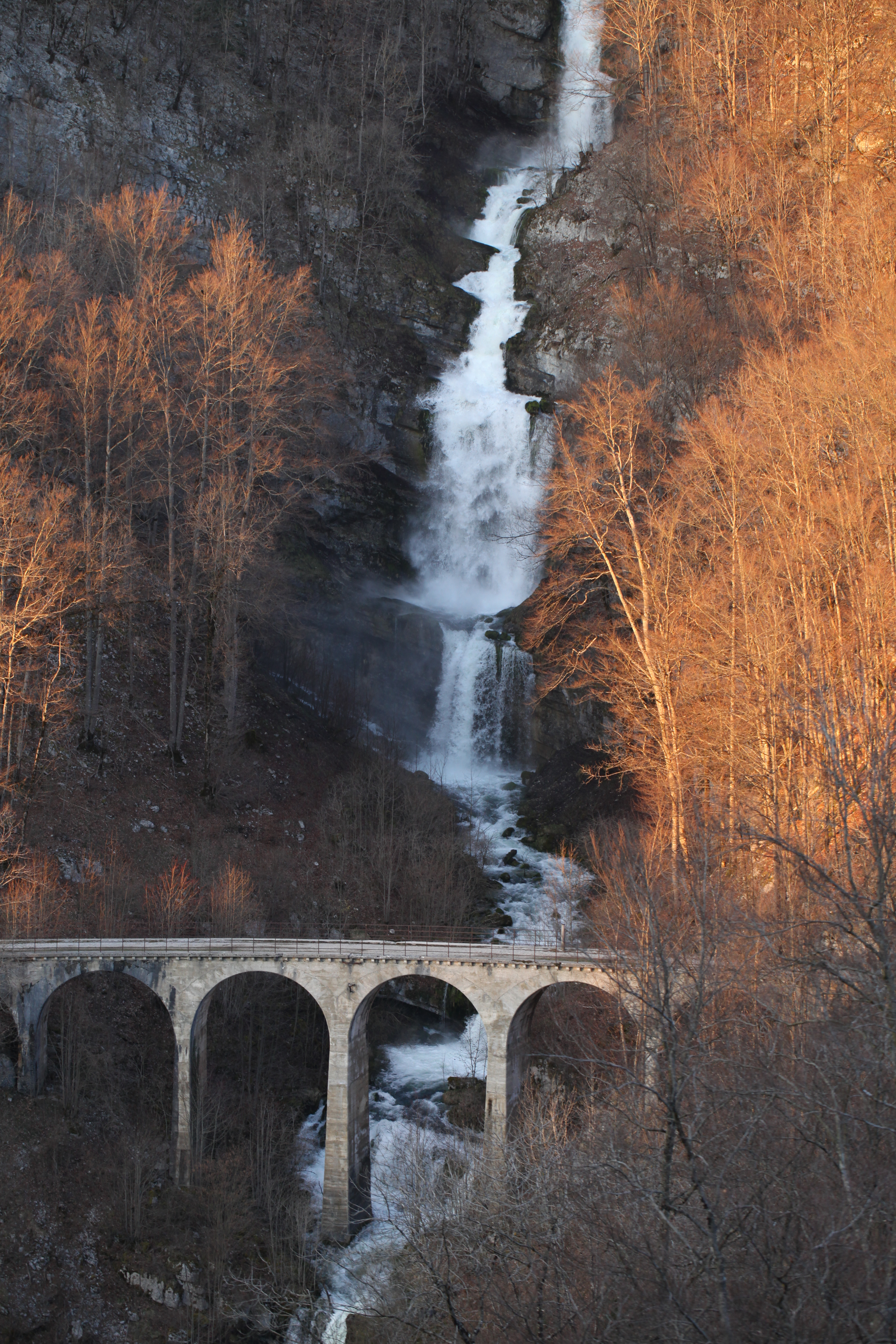
La Cascade du Bief de la Ruine in April 2015: right tributary of the Saine.

Nineteen kilometers long, the Saine rises in a green, sparsely populated area, in the small village of Foncine-le-Haut, in the Haut-Jura Regional Nature Park, at an altitude of around 892 m.

First, it heads south-west, then, on reaching Foncine-le-Bas, it bends north-west and cuts deeply into the limestone plateau, creating the gorges de Malvaux, where it receives a right-bank tributary, the Bief de la Ruine, with its famous waterfall. Near the village of Les Planches-en-Montagne, it creates a spectacular 1 km-long fault, the Gorges de la Langouette. It then continues in the same direction until its confluence with the Ain at Syam, four kilometers upstream of Champagnole, at an altitude of 521 m.

== Communes and cantons crossed ==
In the Jura department alone, the Saine flows through five communes and two cantons:

- from upstream to downstream: Foncine-le-Haut (source), Foncine-le-Bas, Les Planches-en-Montagne, Chaux-des-Crotenay, Syam (confluence).

In terms of cantons, the Saine rises in the canton of Les Planches-en-Montagne, and flows into the canton of Champagnole, all in the arrondissement of Lons-le-Saunier.

== Watershed ==
The Saine flows through four hydrographic zones 'L'Ain de la Saine à l'Anguillon (zones V200 V201 excluded)' (V204), 'La Saine de la Lemme à l'Ain' (V203), 'La Saine de sa source à la Lemme' (V202), 'L'Ain de la Serpentine à la Saine' (V201) for a total surface area of 511 km^{2}.

== Affluents ==
The Saine has six listed tributaries:

- le Bief Brideau (rg), 3.7 km on the two communes of Foncine-le-Haut and Chatelblanc
- the Sainette (rg), 4.3 km on the two communes of Foncine-le-Bas and Foncine-le-Haut with one tributary:
  - le Galavo (rg), 2.4 km on the commune of Foncine-le-Bas alone, with one tributary:
    - the Ruisseau du Lac (rg), 4.4 km on the two communes of Foncine-le-Bas and Lac-des-Rouges-Truites, with its source in the Lac des Rouges-Truites.
- Ruisseau d'Entre Côtes (rd), 6.1 km in the communes of Foncine-le-Haut and Les Planches-en-Montagne.
- La Senge (rg), 3.6 km on the three communes of Foncine-le-Bas, Fort-du-Plasne and Les Planches-en-Montagne, which crosses Lac à la Dame and rises at Fontaine Noire.
- Ruisseau de Poutin (rd), 2 km in the commune of Les Planches-en-Montagne alone.
- The Lemme (rg), 16.7 km over nine communes and with seven tributaries.

== Hydrology ==
The modulus of the Saine at its confluence with the Ain is 8.5 m^{3}/s for a catchment area of just 196 km^{2}. The water level flowing through the basin is 1,360 millimeters per year, which is very high, four times higher than the average for France as a whole, and also higher than the average for the Ain basin, which is already very high (1,070 millimeters per year at Chazey-sur-Ain). Its specific discharge, or Qsp, is therefore a solid 43.4 liters per second per square kilometer of basin.

== Tourism ==
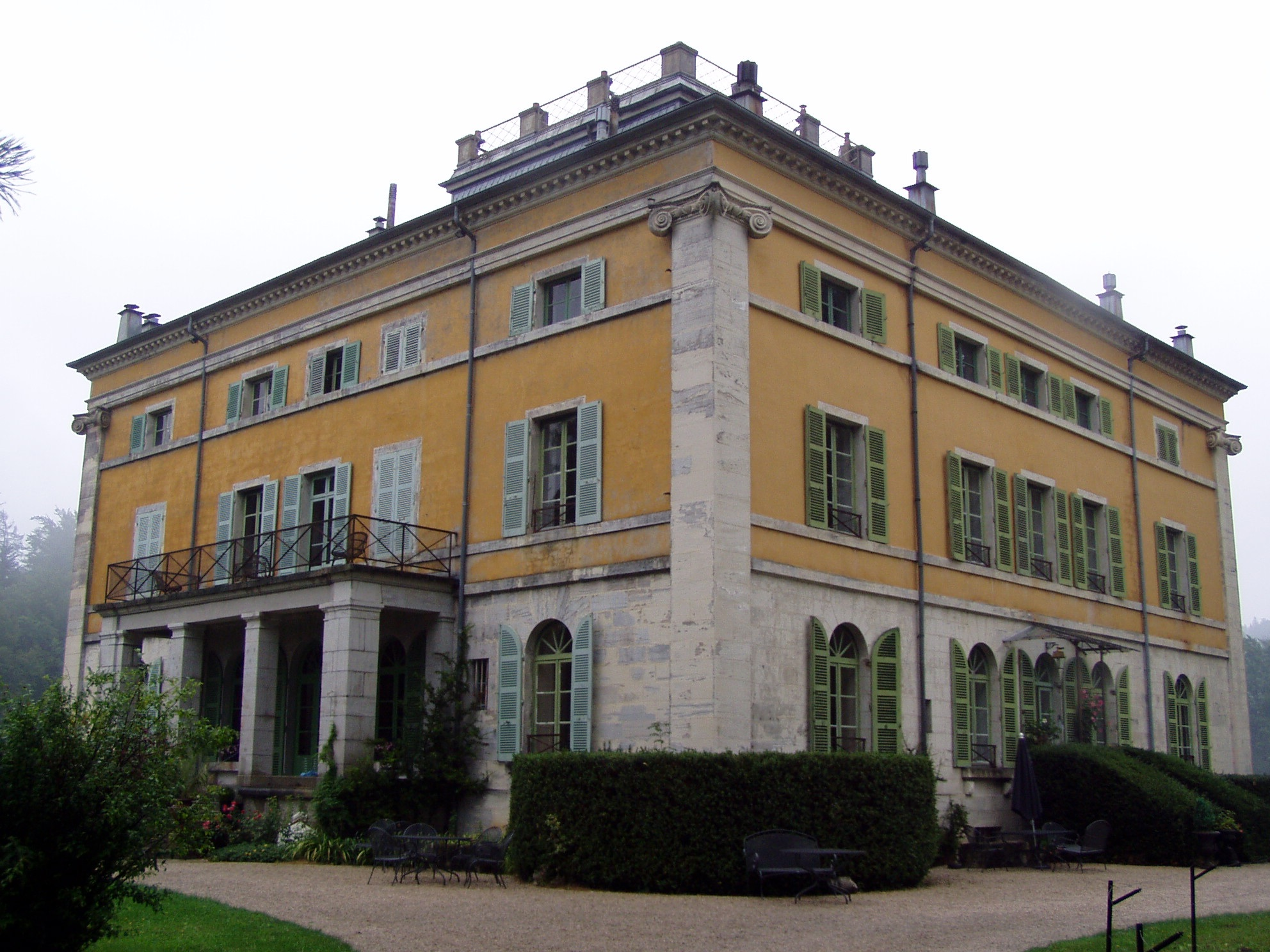
The Palladian villa at Syam.

Covering more than 1,100 hectares, the upper Saine valley has been classified under the French Environment Code since September 2011 for its picturesque character.

Highlights include:

- Gorges de la Langouette, Forêt de la Haute Joux, Forêt du Mont Noir, Cascades.

== Fishing and ecology ==
The Saine is a first category river and belongs to the AAPPMA La Langouette, La Sainette and Truite de Baume. The river is home to many trout.

Several power stations have been built in this valley.

== Gallery ==
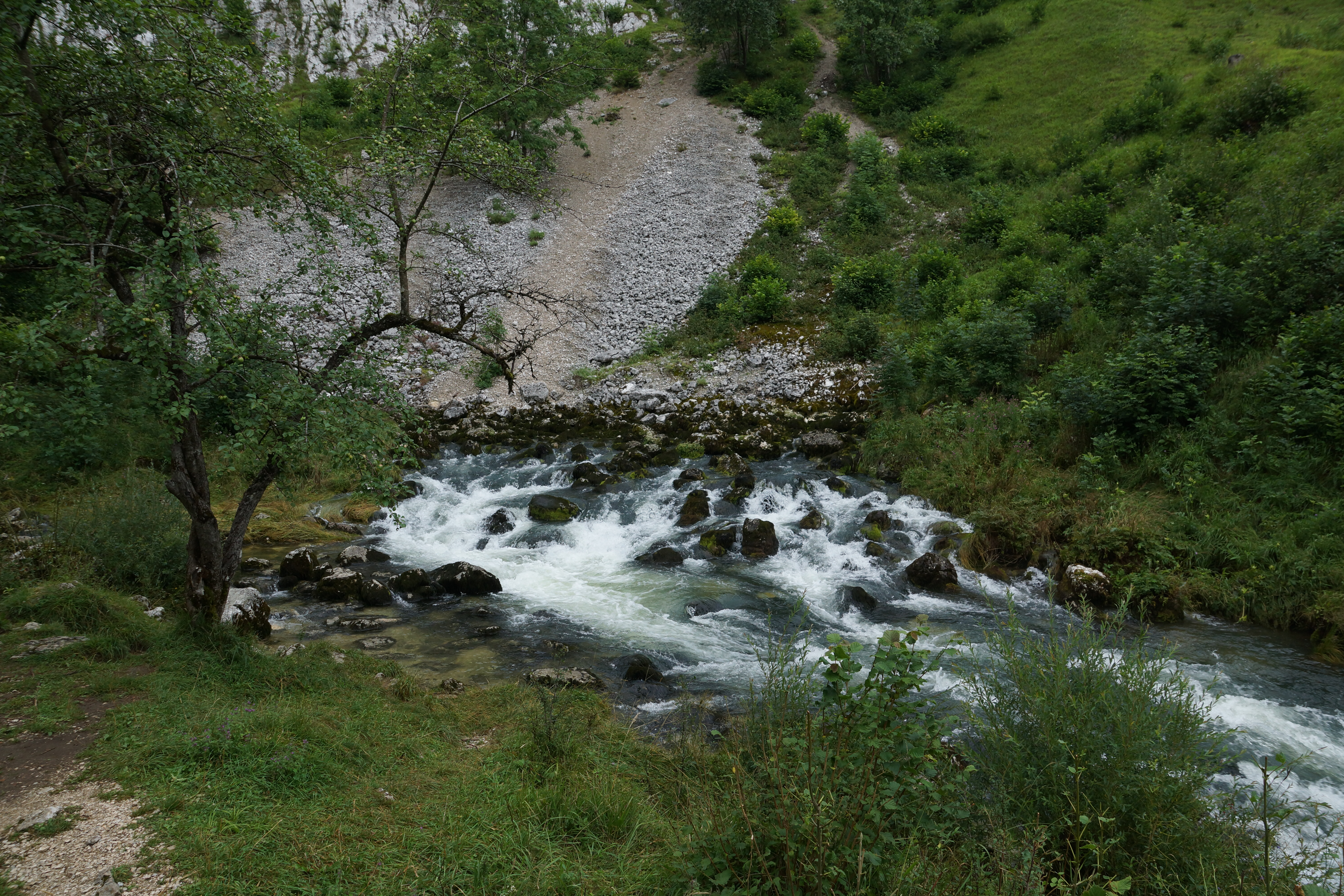
source of the Saine at Foncine-le-Haut

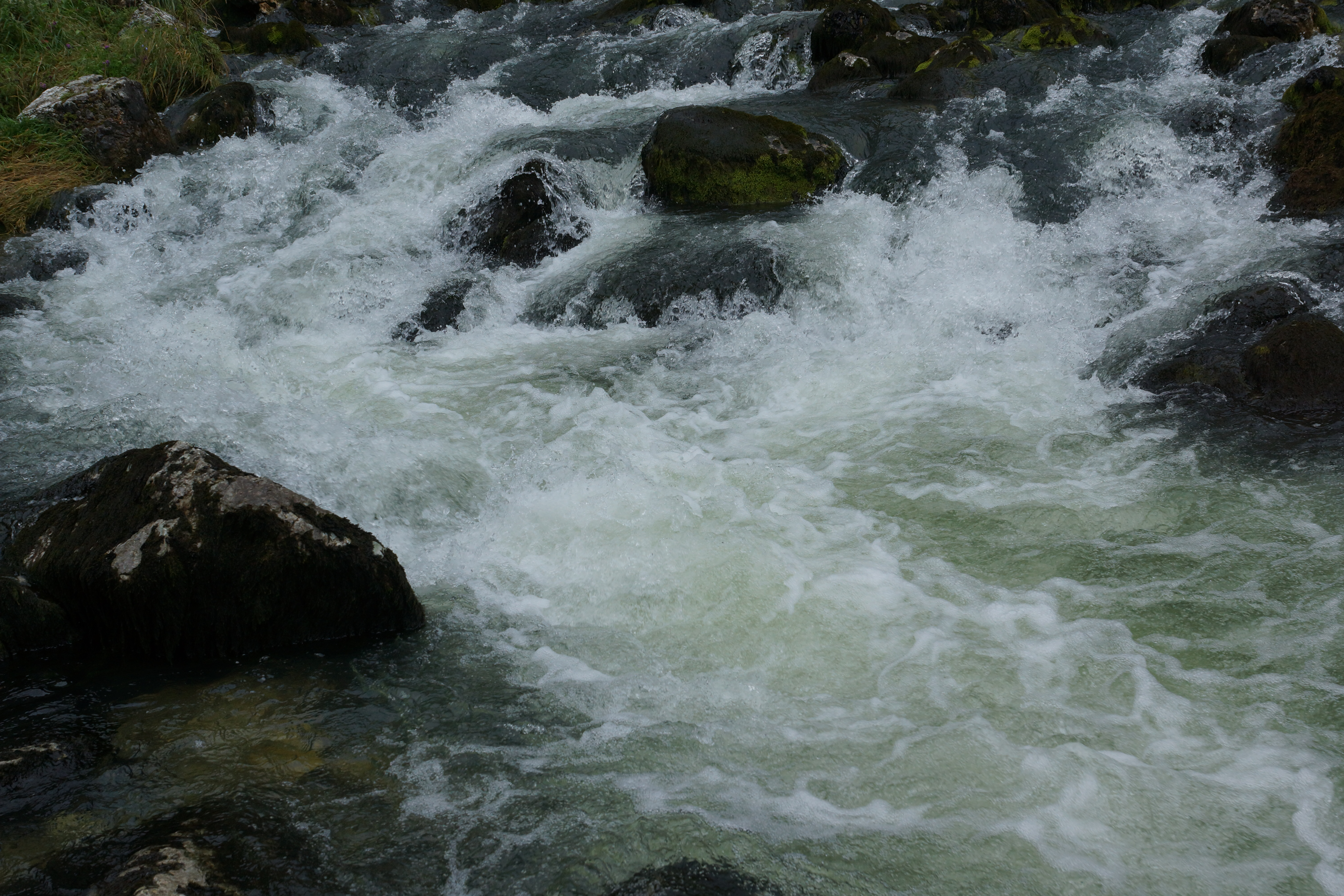
Saine spring, tumultuous waters.

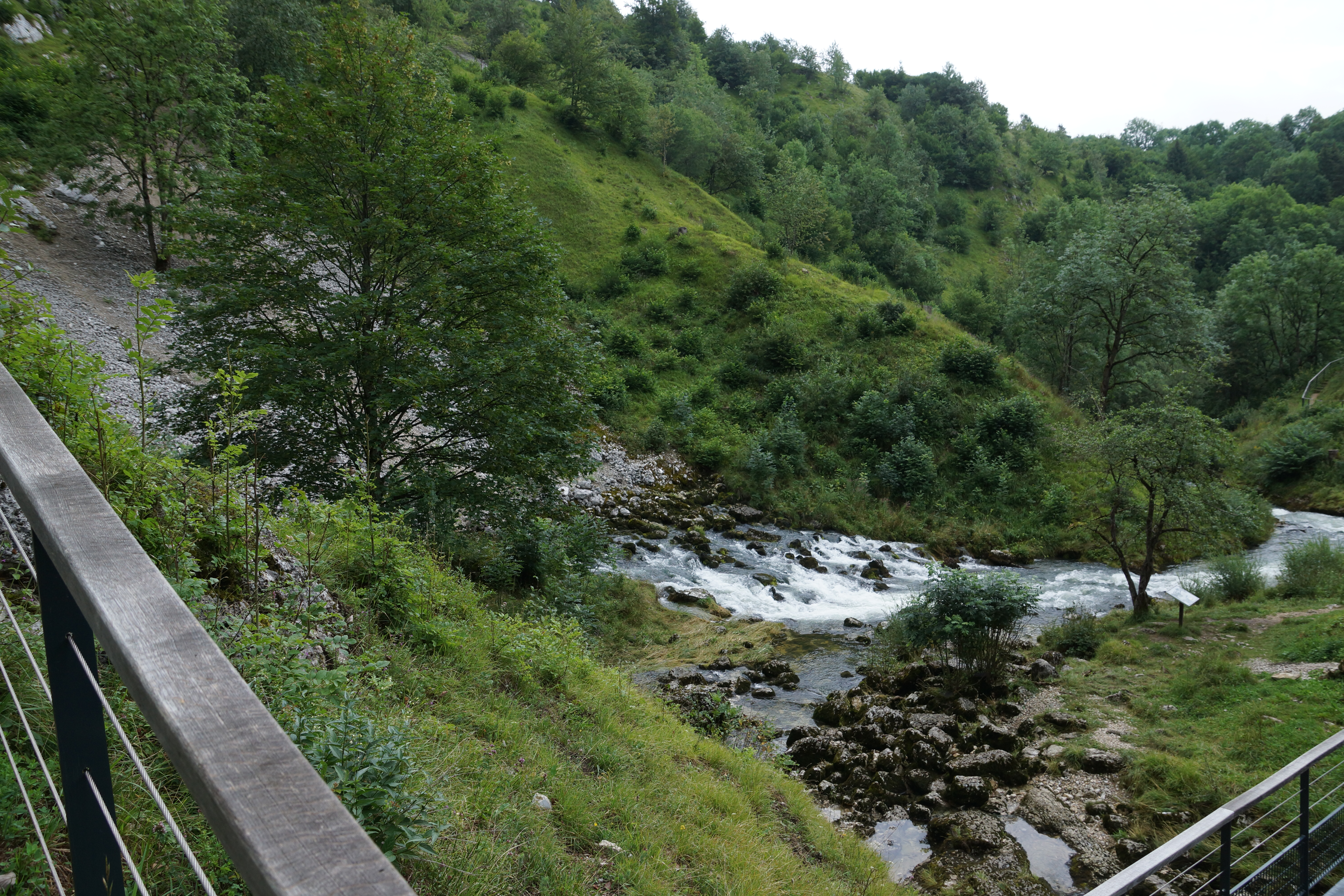
another view of the source of the Saine

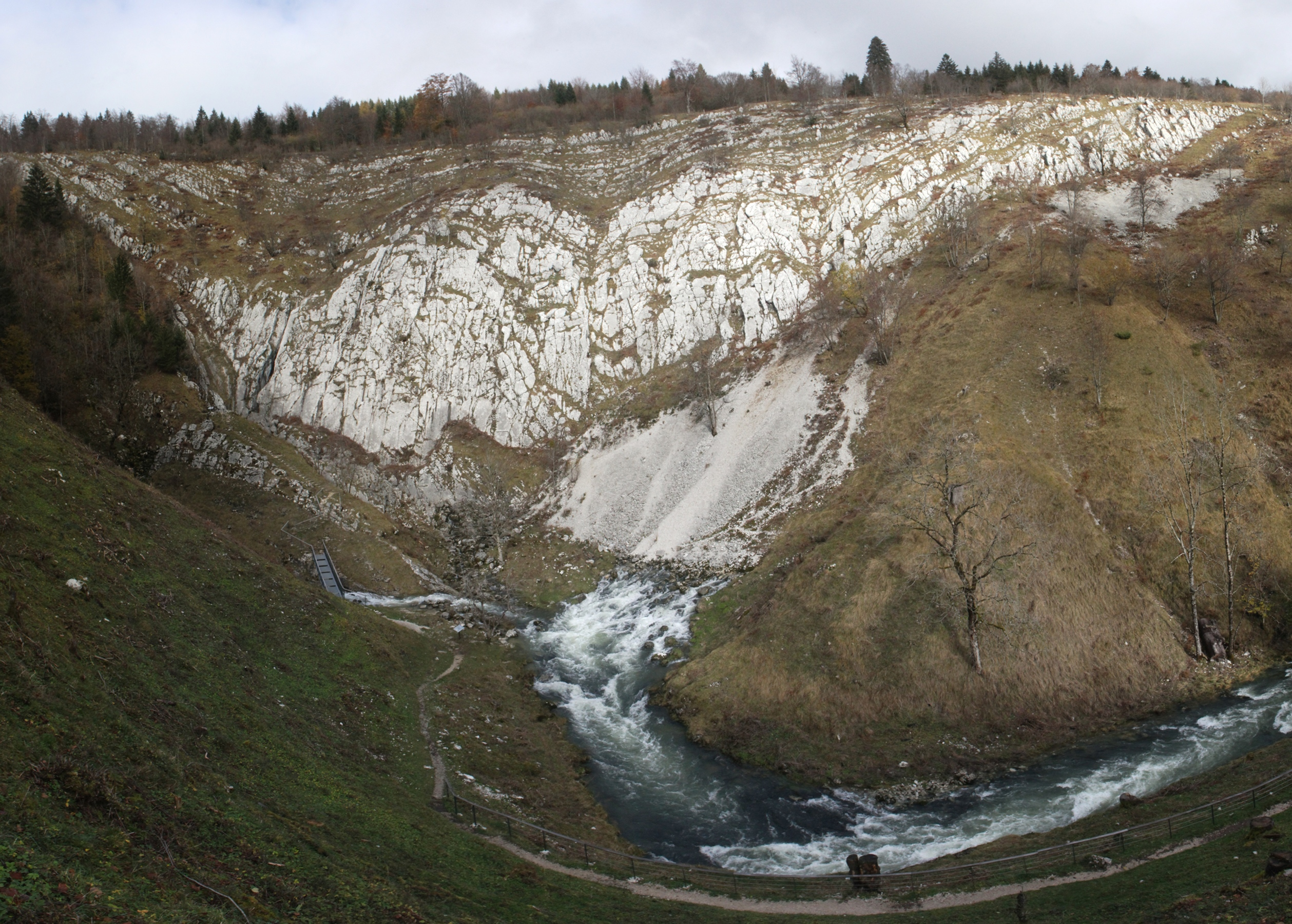
Saine overview

== See also ==
- Parc naturel régional du Haut-Jura
- Ain (river)
