= Helhest =

Three-legged horse in Danish folklore

In Danish folklore, a helhest (Danish "Hel horse") is a three-legged horse associated with Hel. Various Danish phrases are recorded that refer to the horse. The Helhest is associated with death and illness, and it is mentioned in folklore as having been spotted in various locations in Denmark.

== Folklore ==
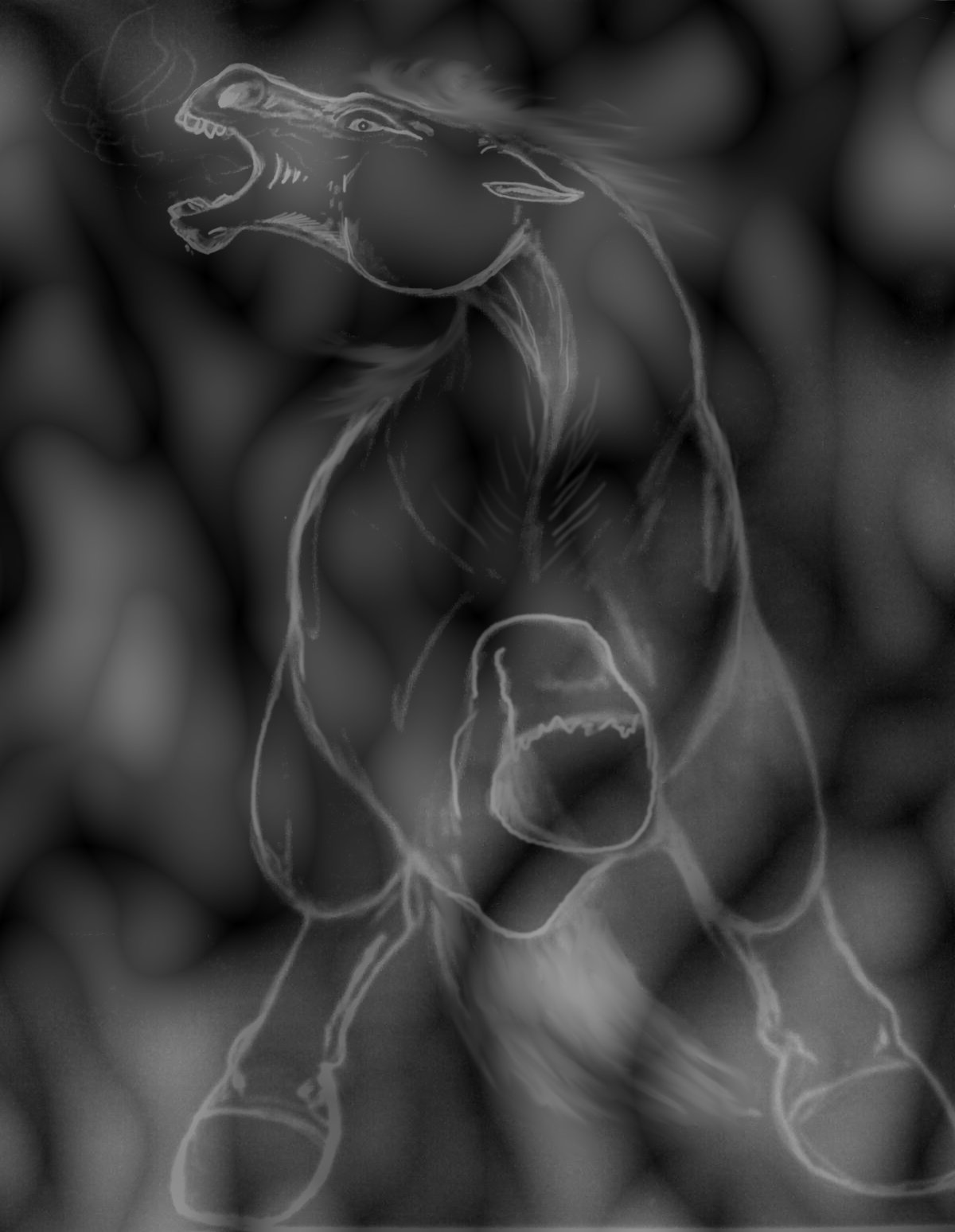
An artistic depiction of a Helhest.

A number of Danish phrases connected to the horse were recorded in the 19th century, such as "at gå eller træde som en Helhest" ("to walk or step like a Hel-horse") for someone who takes strong or heavy steps and thus causes noise. According to Jacob Grimm, the helhest was sometimes described as going "around the graveyard on three legs, causing death", and from Schleswig, a phrase is recorded that, in time of plague, "die (corrected by Grimm from der) Hel rides about on a three-legged horse, destroying men". 19th century scholar Benjamin Thorpe connects the Danish phrase "he gave death a pack of oats" when an individual survives a near-fatal disease to notions of the Helhest, considering the oats either an offering or a bribe.

According to folklore, the Aarhus Cathedral yard at times features the Hel-horse. A tale recorded in the 19th century details that, looking through his window at the cathedral one evening, a man yelled "What horse is outside?" A man sitting beside him said "It is perhaps the Hel-horse." "Then I will see it!" exclaimed the man, and upon looking out the window he grew deathly pale, but would not detail afterward what he had seen. Soon thereafter he grew sick and died. At the Roskilde Cathedral, people in former times would spit on a narrow stone where a Helhest was said to be buried.

Legend dictates that "in every churchyard in former days, before any human body was buried in it, a living horse was interred. This horse re-appears and is known by the name of 'Hel-horse.'" 19th century scholar Jacob Grimm theorizes that, prior to Christianization, the helhest was originally the steed of the goddess Hel.

== See also ==
- List of fictional horses
- Sleipnir, the eight-legged steed owned by the god Odin, which is rode to Hel in Norse mythology
- Valravn, a raven of the slain recorded in Danish folklore
- Horse sacrifice, a common ritual among Indo-European peoples
- Legendary horses in the Jura
