= Segomo =

Ancient Celtic war god

Segomo (Gaulish for 'the victorious one') was an ancient Celtic god worshipped in eastern Gaul, generally understood as a god of war and victory. He is attested only in inscriptions, in which he appears chiefly as a byname of the Roman Mars under the interpretatio romana, most often as Mars Segomo, though at one site he is named on his own as deo Segomoni. Because the same element possibly also attaches to the Roman Hercules and recurs in personal names across the Celtic world, Segomo is generally taken to be a descriptive title rather than a proper name. His cult is concentrated among the Sequani and their neighbours the Aedui and Ambarri, in the region of the upper Saône and Rhône.

== Name ==
Segomo is known only from Latin votive inscriptions, where the name appears in the dative as Segomoni, most often in the phrase Marti Segomoni ('to Mars Segomo') and once as deo Segomoni ('to the god Segomo') without Mars. The theonym does not occur in classical literature.

The name is Gaulish. It is built on the stem sego- ('victory' or 'force, strength') and is generally rendered 'the victorious one' or 'victor'. The same stem is continued in Old Irish seg ('strength, vigour') and Welsh hy ('bold'). Xavier Delamarre holds that the sense 'victory' for the Gaulish name, rather than merely 'force', is supported by the Germanic equivalent *segez- ('triumph, victory'), the root being Indo-European *segh- ('to overpower').

Jan de Vries took the name as a superlative, 'the most victorious', and as pointing to a god who grants victory. Because the word is a description rather than a personal name, the same element is attached to more than one Roman god. Miranda Aldhouse-Green and James MacKillop both note that Segomo serves as a byname of the Roman Mars and of Hercules alike, MacKillop treating it as 'more a title than an actual name'.

== Cult ==
Segomo is attested at a small number of sites in eastern Gaul, among the Sequani and their neighbours the Aedui and Ambarri. In most of the dedications the god is invoked as Mars Segomo, but at the sanctuary of Les Bolards, near Nuits-Saint-Georges, he is named on his own, deo Segomoni.

The most fully preserved dedication comes from Lugdunum. It was made by a man who describes himself as flamen and duumvir of the civitas of the Sequani. On the strength of his rank, de Vries placed the inscription around 70 to 80 AD and argued that Segomo was probably seen as a major god there.

At Les Bolards, the shrine that yielded the deo Segomoni dedication also produced a bronze horse linked to the god, together with other images of horses and horsemen. The remaining dedications are the offerings of private individuals, from Culoz in the territory of the Ambarri and from Arinthod in that of the Sequani. At Culoz the god carries a second byname alongside Segomo, Dunatis, which Duval read as marking Mars as the guardian of the fortified settlement.

== Interpretation ==
Segomo is generally understood as one of the many native war-gods of Gaul who were identified with the Roman Mars under the interpretatio romana. The Gaulish and British Mars was often venerated as a horseman, and the bronze horse from Les Bolards has been read in the light of this aspect of the god.

The Gaulish Mars carried a great number of bynames. These are commonly read as showing him taking over the place of the local tribal god as leader of the host in war and guardian of the land in peace. Bynames of this kind, occurring only once or twice, are generally taken to belong to local tribal deities. Because Segomo is a description rather than a proper name, the same element is attached to more than one god. Besides Mars it possibly also appears with Hercules. Miranda Aldhouse-Green connects the fragmentary dedication to 'Hercules Saegon' from Calleva Atrebatum in Britain with the same epithet in a slightly different form. (Note: James MacKillop further suggests that Segomo may be identical with Cocidius, a war-god of Roman Britain. The suggestion rests on their shared character and is not otherwise secured.)

The theonym appears to be echoed in early Irish tradition: the name Nia Segamain, going back to an Ogham form, has been read as containing the god's name. De Vries glossed it 'warrior of Segamon' and MacKillop as 'servant of Segomo'.

== Epigraphy ==
Segomo is named in a small group of Latin votive inscriptions from eastern Gaul. In most he is invoked as Mars Segomo, and at Les Bolards (Nuits-Saint-Georges) as deo Segomoni without Mars.

| Text | Find-spot | Divine name(s) | Translation | Reference | Comments |
|---|---|---|---|---|---|
| [et Ma]rti Segomoni sacrum [ex stipe] annua [Q(uintus) Adginnius Ur]bici fil(ius) Martinus [Sequanus sac]erdos Romae et Aug(ustorum) [creatus M(arco) Ner]atio Pansa co(n)s(ule) [flamen IIvir in c]ivitate Sequanorum [cui tres provincia]e Galliae honores [omnes impensis] suis decreverunt | Lugdunum | Mars Segomo | And sacred to Mars Segomo, from the annual offering, Quintus Adginnius Martinus, son of Urbicus, a Sequanus, made priest of Rome and the Augusti in the consulship of Neratius Pansa, flamen and duumvir in the civitas of the Sequani, on whom the three provinces of Gaul decreed all honours. | CIL XIII, 1675 | Made by a Sequanian notable, priest of Rome and the Augusti and flamen and duumvir of the Sequani. Heavily restored. The preserved text opens with 'and to Mars Segomo', so a further deity may have been named first. Dated by the consulship of Neratius Pansa. |
| N(uminibus) Aug(ustorum) deo Marti Segomoni Dunati Cassia Saturnina ex voto v(otum) s(olvit) l(ibens) m(erito) | Culoz (Ambarri) | Mars Segomo Dunatis | To the divine powers of the Augusti and to the god Mars Segomo Dunatis, Cassia Saturnina willingly and deservedly fulfilled her vow. | CIL XIII, 2532 | Mars is given the double byname Segomo Dunatis. |
| [...] deo Segomoni donavi(t) v(otum) s(olvit) l(ibens) m(erito) | Nuits-Saint-Georges (Aedui) | Segomo | [...] gave this to the god Segomo and fulfilled his vow willingly and deservedly. | CIL XIII, 2846 | Segomo named without Mars. From the sanctuary of Les Bolards. A second, damaged text on the same monument, reading Gallio L(uci) Maturci, is recorded under the same number. |
| Marti Segomoni sacrum Paternus Dagusae f(ilius) v(otum) s(olvit) l(ibens) m(erito) | Arinthod (Sequani) | Mars Segomo | Sacred to Mars Segomo, Paternus son of Dagusa fulfilled his vow willingly and deservedly. | CIL XIII, 5340 | From the territory of the Sequani, in Germania Superior. |
| [M]arti Segomoni et [...] | Nuits-Saint-Georges (Aedui) | Mars Segomo (with a further, lost name) | To Mars Segomo and [...]. | AE 1994, 1224 | Fragmentary. From Nuits-Saint-Georges. Segomo appears to have been paired with a further deity whose name is lost. Dated to between the mid-2nd and the 3rd century AD. |
| Deo Her[culi] Saegon[tio(?)] T(itus) Tammon[ius] Saeni Tammon[i fil(ius)] Vitalis ob hono[rem] [ | Silchester | Hercules Saegontius(?) | To the god Hercules Saegontius(?), Titus Tammonius Vitalis, son of Saenus Tammonius, [set this up] in honour [of …]. | CIL VII, 0006 | Dated 100–130 AD |
