= Cheval Gauvin =

Legendary evil horse

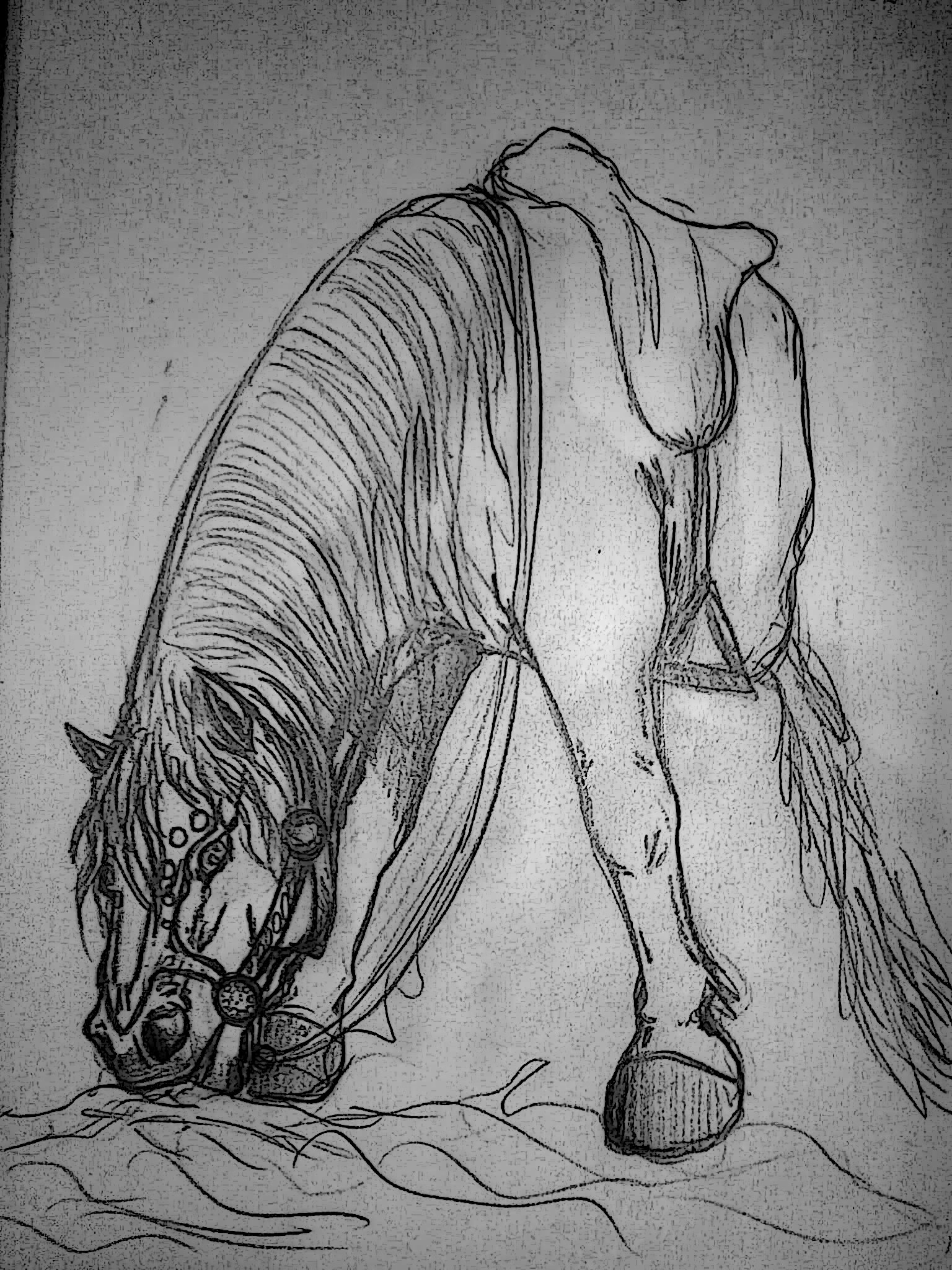
- The Gauvin horse has two legs in the Joux and Bernese Jura legends.
- Grouping: Evil spirit
- Similar entities: Cheval Mallet
- Folklore: Legend
- Other name(s): Cheval Gauvain, chevau Gauvin, tchevâ Gâvïn
- Region: Franche-Comté, Jura, Bernese Jura

The Cheval Gauvin (French: Gauvin horse) is a legendary evil horse of Franche-Comté, France and the Jura Mountains in Switzerland. It is said to wander along watercourses, through forests and graveyards, and to attempt to kill those who ride it, either by drowning them or throwing them into an abyss.

A legend relating to this horse was first collected in Chamblay by Désiré Monnier, who published it in 1854. Identical stories are also told in Montbarrey, Joux, Dole, in France as well as in the Swiss canton of Jura and in the Bernese Jura. In Switzerland, the horse gallops through villages and abducts young girls. Several legends are attached to it, one of which makes it the mount of the medieval lord Amauri III de Joux. A woman's account of meeting him in the Chamblay cemetery has been commented on and told since the 19th century. A harbinger of death, the Gauvin horse seems to have acted as a bogeyman for children. Perhaps the result of a goblin's transformation (a hobgoblin), he joins a large number of legendary Jura horses.

== Etymology and terminology ==
The Gauvin horse bears the same name as a famous knight of the Round Table, nephew of King Arthur. Two forms exist: "Gauvin" is the most common, "Gauvain", which may also the animal's actual name, may also appear occasionally. In Franche-Comté, it is mentioned as tchevâ Gâvïn in the archives of popular traditions. The form chevau Gauvin exists in Jura patois. The origin of this name remains unknown.

== See also ==
- List of legendary horses
- Kelpie
- Cheval Mallet
- Legendary horses of Pas-de-Calais

== Bibliography ==
- Désiré Monnier, Traditions populaires comparées, J. B. Dumoulin, 1854, 812 p.
- Marie Émile Aimé Vingtrinier, Croyances et traditions populaires, 1874, 2e éd.
- Henri Dontenville, Histoire et géographie mythiques de la France, G. P. Maisonneuve et Larose, 1973, 378 p. (ISBN 9782706805523)
- Henri Dontenville, Mythologie française : Regard de l'histoire, Payot, 1973, 2e éd., 267 p.
- Willy Borgeaud, Mythologie de la Suisse ancienne, vol. 2, Librairie de l'Université Georg, 1965, 141 p.
- Arnold Van Gennep, Manuel de folklore français contemporain : Cycle des douze jours, vol. 7, Picard, 1987 (ISBN 9782708400740)
- Jean-Michel Doulet, Quand les démons enlevaient les enfants: les changelins : étude d'une figure mythique : Traditions & croyances, Presses de l'Université de Paris-Sorbonne, 2002, 433 p. (ISBN 9782840502364)
- Hervé Thiry-Duval, L'esprit féerique. Dictionnaire des fées en Pays Comtois, Langres, Dominique Guéniot, 1 March 2005 (ISBN 978-2878252453)
- Paul Sébillot, Le folklore de France, vol. 1, Librairie orientale & américaine, 1904, 977 p.
- Jules Surdez et Gilbert Lovis, Animaux et contes fantastiques du Jura, Éditions du Pré-Carré, 1984, 164 p.
- Jean-Louis Thouard, Bestiaire fantastique du pays de Comté, Édition Marie-Noëlle, 1er janvier 1996, 99 p. (ISBN 978-2910186180)
- Patricia Gaillard et Dominique Lesbros, Contes et légendes du Jura, Éditions de Borée, 2007, 536 p. (ISBN 9782844945914)
