= Valravn =

Supernatural raven in Danish folklore

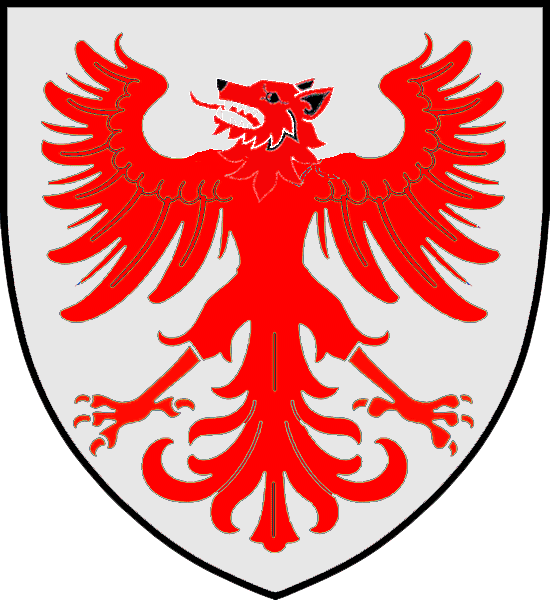
Coat of arms of the Ulfeldt family, featuring a heraldic valravn

A valravn is a supernatural raven in Danish renaissance folklore. It principally appears in the folk ballad "Valravnen" (Danish: The Valravn) where it is depicted as a knight who was transformed into a raven, and whose curse can only be broken by consuming the blood of a boy.

== Folk ballad ==
The ballad "Valravnen" has the type DgF 60/TSB A 17. The earliest version of the ballad is known from Jens Billes Håndskrift (Danish: Jens Bille's Handwritten Notes), dated to 1555–1559, though the ballad is thought to have originated in the late Middle Ages. The following is the second-oldest version of the ballad, version B:

Raffuen hand flyger om natten,
om dagen hand icke maa:
den skall haffue den onnde lycke,
den gode kand icke faa.
Men raffuen flyger om natten.

Thet vor Volffuer vilde raffuen,
hand flyger saa høyt vedt skye:
daa saa hand den lidell Elffuer,
skulle gaa sin ærinnde y by.

"Hør du, liden Elffuer,
hui græder du saa saare?
hvad helder græder du for fader din,
eller for brøder baade?"

"Icke greder ieg for fader elle brødre,
iegh sørger for festermand min:
kunde ieg till hannem komme,
foruden vor all min quide."

"Then første søn, i sammen faar,
oc vilt du den giffue migh:
till din festermands lannde
da vill ieg føre digh."

Det vor Volff vilde raffn,
hand sette hende paa sin bagh:
saa førde hand hende till sin festermand,
sig selff till stuor umagh.

Saa tog hand then skønne iomfru,
hand sette hende paa thinnde:
"Nu sidder du paa den samme huss,
som thin festermand er inde."

Udestod iomfruens festermand,
saa giørligh hand det saa:
"Det vill migh till glede gaa,
at du skalt migh hende faa."

Saa druck hand sit brullup
met glede och megen roo:
10 ugger, ther epther kom,
hun fødde en søn saa froo.

Saa saare hun græd, oc hender hun slog,
for det vor icke en møe:
"Nu skal Wolff vilde raffn
sla dig till din død."

Ther kom fliffuindis offuer then huss
en raffn, hand vor saa leedt:
saa saare da gred bode fruer och møer,
oc deris hender de vred.

Udt da gick then edelig herre
oc bød hannom borge saa bolde,
oc saa der-till halff sin lannd,
om hand sin søn motte beholde.

"Fanger jeg icke de lidell barn,
da skalt du det fortryde:
ieg skall slaa dig selff ihiel
och øde alle dine rige."

Saa bar de udt det lidell barn,
som laa paa moderen oc dyde:
ther græd alle, i husit vor,
oc bar stuor sorrig og quide.

Then raffn slo hannem gennem bryst,
drack halff hans hierte-blod:
saa bleff hand den feierste rider,
paa iorden motte gaa.

Thi fald alle paa thieris bare kneæ
oc tacket Gud for sin naade:
saa fick det barn till liff igien,
saa bleff de frelsset baade.
Men raffnen flyger om natten.

Translation:

The raven flies at night,
during the day he mustn't:
it shall only have bad luck,
it can't have good [luck].
But the raven flies at night.

It was Volffuer wild raven,
he flies so high in the sky:
then he saw little Elffuer,
on her way to run errands in town.

"Hear ye, little Elffuer,
why are you crying so?
are you crying for your father,
or brother or both?"

"I cry not for father or brother,
I mourn for my betrothed:
if I could come to him,
I would be without pain."

"The first son you have together,
will you give to me:
to your betrothed's land
I will then take you."

It was Volff wild raven,
he sets her on his back:
then he took her to her betrothed,
to great effort for himself.

Then he took the lovely maiden,
He put her on the roof:
"Now you sit on the same house,
within which your betrothed is."

The maiden's betrothed came out,
so clearly he saw it:
"It would bring me happiness,
if you gave her to me."

Then he held his wedding
with happiness and peace:
10 weeks passed,
she birthed a son so joyful.

So painfully she cried, and she clasped her hands in prayer,
for it was not a girl:
"Now Wolff wild raven will
slay you to death."

There came, flying over the house,
a raven, he was so mean:
then painfully ladies and maidens cried,
and clasped their hands in prayer.

Out then walked the nobleman
and offered him castles so lovely:
and in addition half his land,
if only he could keep his son.

"If I don't catch that little child,
you will regret it:
I shall kill you yourself
and destroy all your land."

Then they carried that little child,
who laid at his mother and suckled:
then everyone cried, in the house,
and carried great sorrow and pain.

The raven impaled his chest,
drank half his heart-blood:
then he turned into the loveliest knight,
to ever walk the earth.

They all fell to their bare knees
and thanked God for his mercy:
then the child came to life again,
then both of them were saved.
But the raven flies at night

=== Ballad versions ===
There are generally agreed to be six primary versions of this ballad, titled A, B, C, D, E, and F, with C having four derived versions (Cabcd) and F having eight derived versions (Fabcdefgh).

Version A (the earliest version) follows a significantly different structure than the rest, which has led some to consider it a transitional version between the ballad "Germand Gladensvend" (DgF 33/TSB A 74) and the later versions of "Valravnen". Version Fa was authored by Anders Sørensen Vedel in 1590, as a rewrite or "summary" of all the versions known to him at the time. Version Fb is a 1590 rewrite of Vedel's version for the purpose of publication in leaflets and pamphlets. Versions Fcdefgh are rewrites of version Fb from the 1800s. Thus, version A and versions Fabcdefgh are considered non-canonical, or "non-independent".

Version A is the only pre-1800s version of the ballad that refers to the transformed bird as "valravn", and it only does so in the sentences "vilde valle ravn", "vilden vallen ravn" (Danish: wild 'wald' raven) and "vilden valravn" (Danish: wild valravn). As "vallen" is a nonsense word, some linguists have speculated that "valravn" may be an example of alliteration.

Versions B and D were written down in Svanings Håndskrift (Danish: Svaning's Handwritten Notes), circa 1580, by unnamed assistants hired by historian Hans Svaning. In these versions the bird is referred to as "Volffuer vilde ravn" and "villen vallen-ravn", respectively, with "Volffuer" being an old Danish male name.

Version Ca was written down in Langebek's Folio, circa 1630. Versions Cbcd are rewrites of Ca. All these versions refer to the bird as "Vilden Verne-ravn". There is some speculation about the meaning of the word "Verne" in this ballad. According to Grundtvig, it may share its origins with the Old English word were, meaning "man", as seen in werewolf.

Version E was written down in Anna Munks Håndskrift in 1591. In this version, the bird is referred to as "Salman vilde ravn", with Salman being an old Danish male name.

The word "valravn" additionally shows up in some versions of the ballads "Valravn og Dankongen" and "Dansen paa Riberhus" as the name of a knight, albeit with a different pronunciation (emphasis on the syllable "ravn", rather than the syllable "val").

== Folklore ==
In 1893 Evald Tang Kristensen published a collection of 2243 folk tales. Number 120 of chapter C mentions the valravn:

Når de i et slag ikke fik kongen eller hövdingen funden og begravet, så kom der ravne og åd af ham, og disse ravne blev til Valravne, og den, der åd hans hjærte, den fik menneskeforstand og kunde gjøre ondt og forvende mennesker og havde overmenneskelig magt, og det var nogle skrækkelige dyr.

Translation:

After a battle, if the chief or king’s corpse was not found and buried, the ravens would come and eat of him, and these ravens became Valravne, and the one who ate his heart would gain human thought and could do harm and change humans and had superhuman power, and they were terrible creatures.

This anecdote was provided by Peder Johansen, a mill worker from Skanderborg. Peder Johansen (b: April 15, 1855, d: November 24, 1928) was described as an eccentric entertainer, who liked to tell tales after a few drinks. Many of his stories were passed down by his grandfather during Peder's childhood, and Peder would do his best to recount them when Evald Tang Kristensen pulled him aside at a fastelavn party, where this anecdote was likely recorded.

This is the only known source for the idea that valravne are ravens given human speech, rather than humans transformed into ravens, and that they have a connection to battlefields.

== Heraldry ==
The heraldic charge that combines a wolf and an eagle is known as a valravn. It is the charge of the now-extinct Ulfeldt family's coat of arms.

== Interpretations and theories ==
According to 19th century scholar Jacob Grimm, the "vilde ravn or vilde valravn" ("wild raven or wild valravn") take "exactly the place of the diabolical trold" in Danish folk songs. Grimm proposes an Old High German equivalent to the Danish valravn; *walahraban.

== Modern influence ==
The Valravn has inspired occasional pop culture references, including an early 20th century book of short stories as well as the Faroese musical group bearing the name, who play a form of traditional music.

The folk ballad was reinterpreted by the electro-folk band Sorten Muld and became a hit for them in 1997, under the title Ravnen.

Valravn was the title of a Danish Germanic Neopagan magazine published from 2002 to 2007. The name is also mentioned in Danish children's books.

The 2017 video game Hellblade: Senua's Sacrifice features Valravn as "god of illusion", a stage boss the player must defeat to proceed in the game.

Valravn appear as an enemy in the 5th bestiary of the Pathfinder Roleplaying Game, using Grimm's Vilderavn moniker for the creature.

In the Nordic-themed video game expansion Guild Wars 2: Janthir Wilds, Valravn appear as quadrupedal, winged beasts with sharp beaks that seek to consume a child's heart so they can be transformed into a Valravn Knight, loosely adapting the Danish folk tale.

Valravn is the name of Cedar Point's 2016 dive roller coaster.

The 2020 album and song by Gealdýr is called "Valravn".

== See also ==
- Helhest, a three-legged horse that appears in graveyards in Danish folklore
- Werewolf, a man transformed into a wolf
- Huginn and Muninn, the ravens of the god Odin in Norse mythology
