= Commenailles =

Commune in Bourgogne-Franche-Comté, France

- Commune
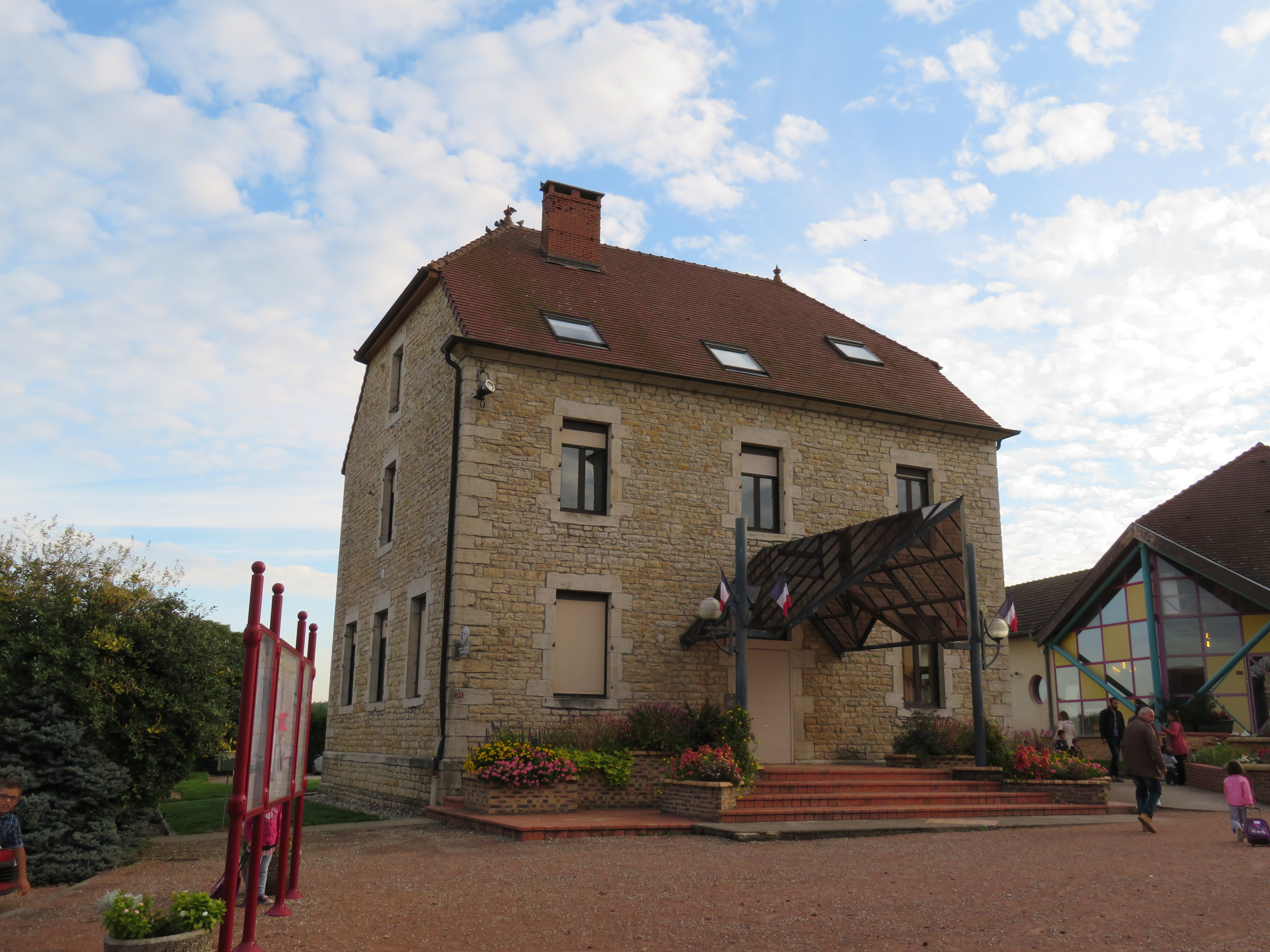
- The town hall in Commenailles
- Location of Commenailles
- Location within France Location within Bourgogne-Franche-Comté
- Coordinates: 46°48′14″N 5°27′09″E
- Country: France
- Region: Bourgogne-Franche-Comté
- Department: Jura
- Arrondissement: Lons-le-Saunier
- Canton: Bletterans

Government
  - Mayor (2020–2026): Jean-Louis Maître
- Area^{1}: 21.52 km^{2} (8.31 sq mi)
- Highest elevation: 222 m (728 ft)
- Lowest elevation: 194 m (636 ft)
- Population (2023): 898
  - Density: 41.7/km^{2} (108/sq mi)
- Time zone: UTC+01:00 (CET)
  - Summer (DST): UTC+02:00 (CEST)
- INSEE/Postal code: 39160 /39140
- ^{1} French Land Register data, which excludes lakes, ponds, glaciers > 1 km^{2} (0.386 sq mi or 247 acres) and river estuaries.

Commenailles (French pronunciation: [kɔm(ə)naj]) is a commune in the Jura department in Bourgogne-Franche-Comté in eastern France.

== Population ==
Historical population
Year	Pop.	±% p.a.
1968	687	—
1975	608	−1.73%
1982	662	+1.22%
1990	688	+0.48%
1999	720	+0.51%
2007	746	+0.44%
2012	818	+1.86%
2017	890	+1.70%
2023	898	+0.15%
Source: INSEE

== See also ==
- Communes of the Jura department
