= Chisséria =

- Part of Arinthod
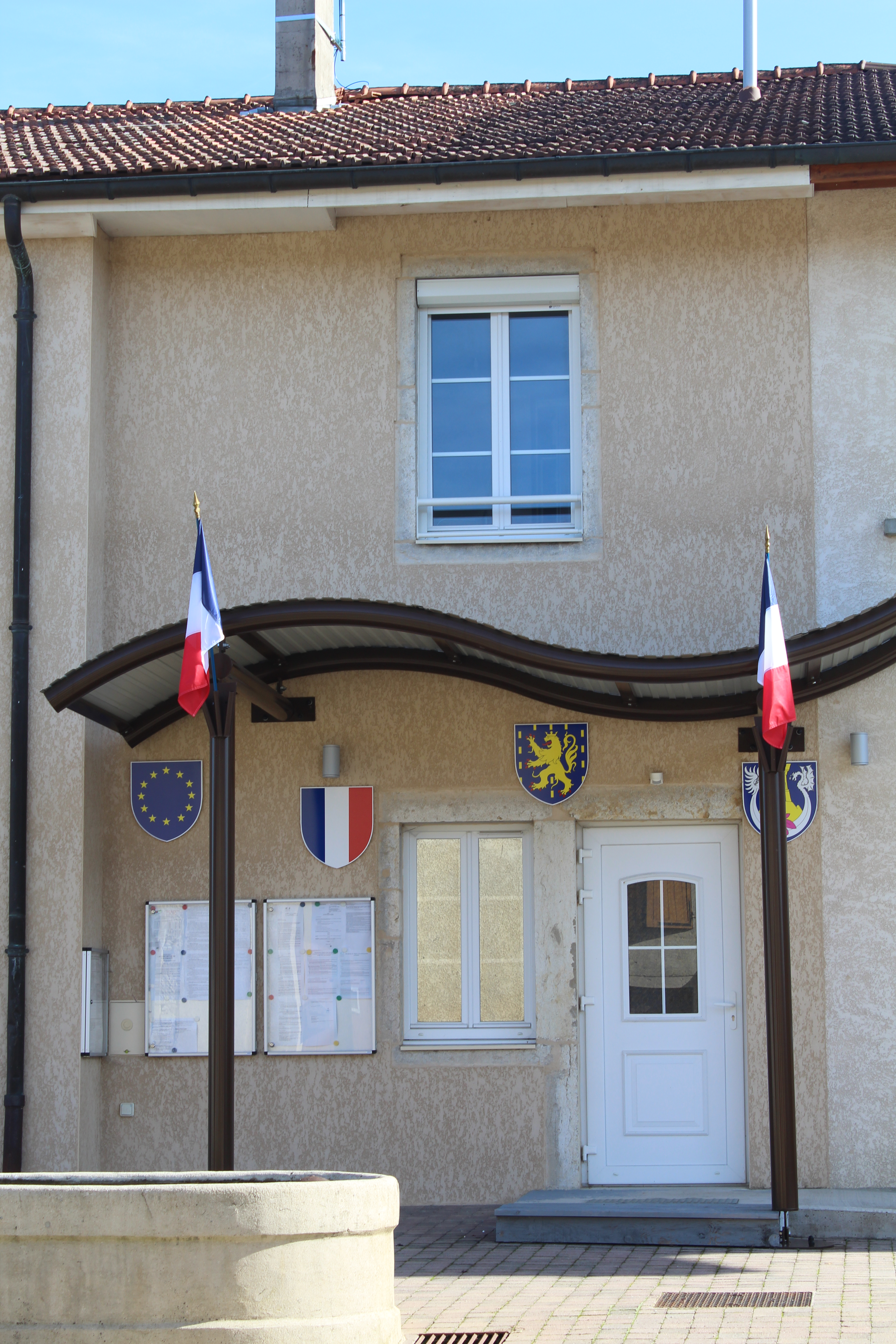
- Town hall

- Coat of arms
- Location of Chisséria
- Location within France Location within Bourgogne-Franche-Comté
- Coordinates: 46°22′49″N 5°33′49″E
- Country: France
- Region: Bourgogne-Franche-Comté
- Department: Jura
- Arrondissement: Lons-le-Saunier
- Canton: Moirans-en-Montagne
- Commune: Arinthod
- Area^{1}: 7.25 km^{2} (2.80 sq mi)
- Highest elevation: 814 m (2,671 ft)
- Lowest elevation: 335 m (1,099 ft)
- Population (2015): 72
  - Density: 9.9/km^{2} (26/sq mi)
- Time zone: UTC+01:00 (CET)
  - Summer (DST): UTC+02:00 (CEST)
- Postal code: 39240
- ^{1} French Land Register data, which excludes lakes, ponds, glaciers > 1 km^{2} (0.386 sq mi or 247 acres) and river estuaries.

Chisséria (French pronunciation: [ʃiseʁja]) is a former commune in the Jura department in Franche-Comté in eastern France. On 1 January 2018, it was merged into the commune of Arinthod.

== See also ==
- Communes of the Jura department
