= Cosges =

Commune in Bourgogne-Franche-Comté, France

- Commune
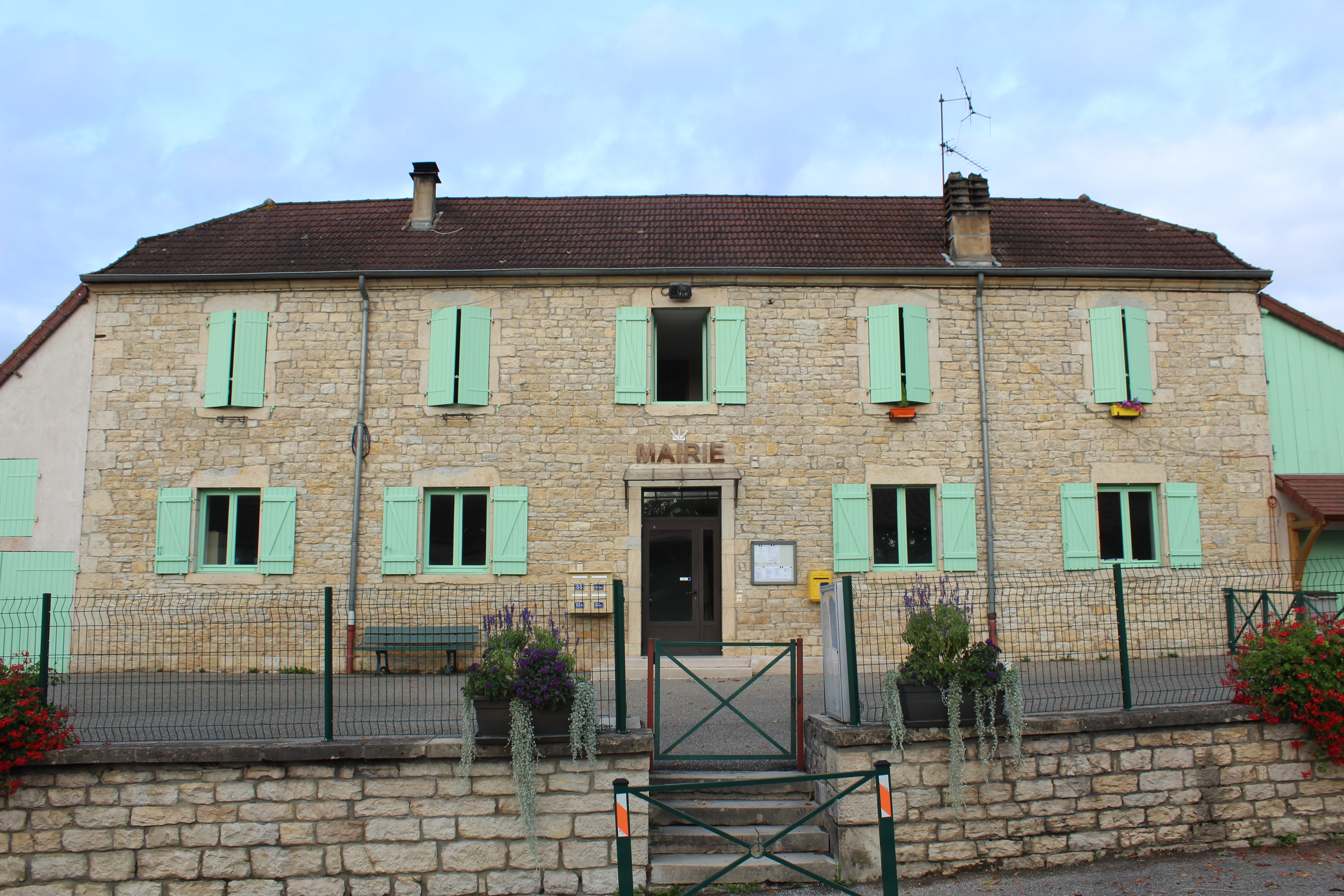
- The town hall in Cosges

- Coat of arms
- Location of Cosges
- Location within France Location within Bourgogne-Franche-Comté
- Coordinates: 46°44′56″N 5°24′17″E
- Country: France
- Region: Bourgogne-Franche-Comté
- Department: Jura
- Arrondissement: Lons-le-Saunier
- Canton: Bletterans

Government
  - Mayor (2024–2026): Jean-Noël Rebouillat
- Area^{1}: 13.49 km^{2} (5.21 sq mi)
- Highest elevation: 216 m (709 ft)
- Lowest elevation: 187 m (614 ft)
- Population (2023): 367
  - Density: 27.2/km^{2} (70.5/sq mi)
- Time zone: UTC+01:00 (CET)
  - Summer (DST): UTC+02:00 (CEST)
- INSEE/Postal code: 39167 /39140
- ^{1} French Land Register data, which excludes lakes, ponds, glaciers > 1 km^{2} (0.386 sq mi or 247 acres) and river estuaries.

Cosges (French pronunciation: [koʒ]) is a commune in the Jura department in Bourgogne-Franche-Comté in eastern France.

== Population ==
Historical population
Year	Pop.	±% p.a.
1968	282	—
1975	283	+0.05%
1982	282	−0.05%
1990	292	+0.44%
1999	301	+0.34%
2007	296	−0.21%
2012	344	+3.05%
2017	364	+1.14%
2023	367	+0.14%
Source: INSEE

== See also ==
- Communes of the Jura department
