= Lac de Narlay =

Lake in Jura, Bourgogne-Franche-Comté, France

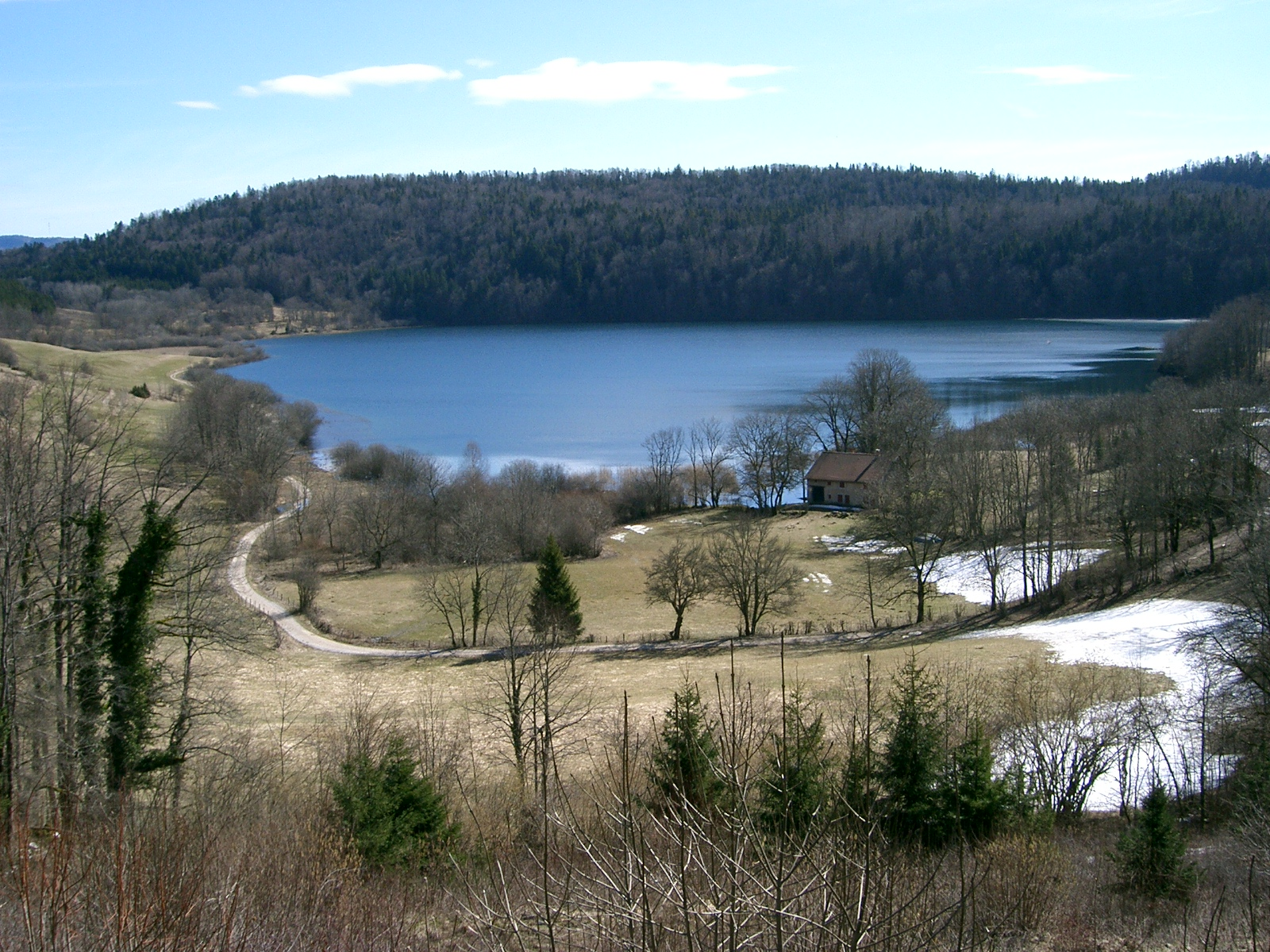

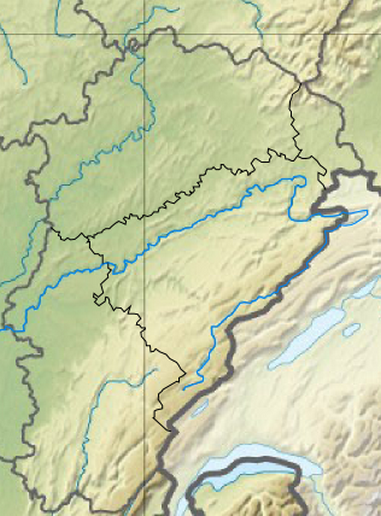
- Location within Franche-Comté
- Location: Jura department, Franche-Comté
- Coordinates: 46°38′32″N 5°54′45″E
- Primary inflows: springs
- Primary outflows: lake Chalain
- Catchment area: 5.5 km^{2} (2.1 sq mi)
- Basin countries: France
- Surface area: 41 ha (100 acres)
- Max. depth: 40 m (130 ft)
- Water volume: 8.2 hm^{3} (6,600 acre⋅ft)
- Surface elevation: 748 m (2,454 ft)

Lac de Narlay is a lake in the Jura department of France.
