= Arinthod =

Commune in Bourgogne-Franche-Comté, France

- Commune
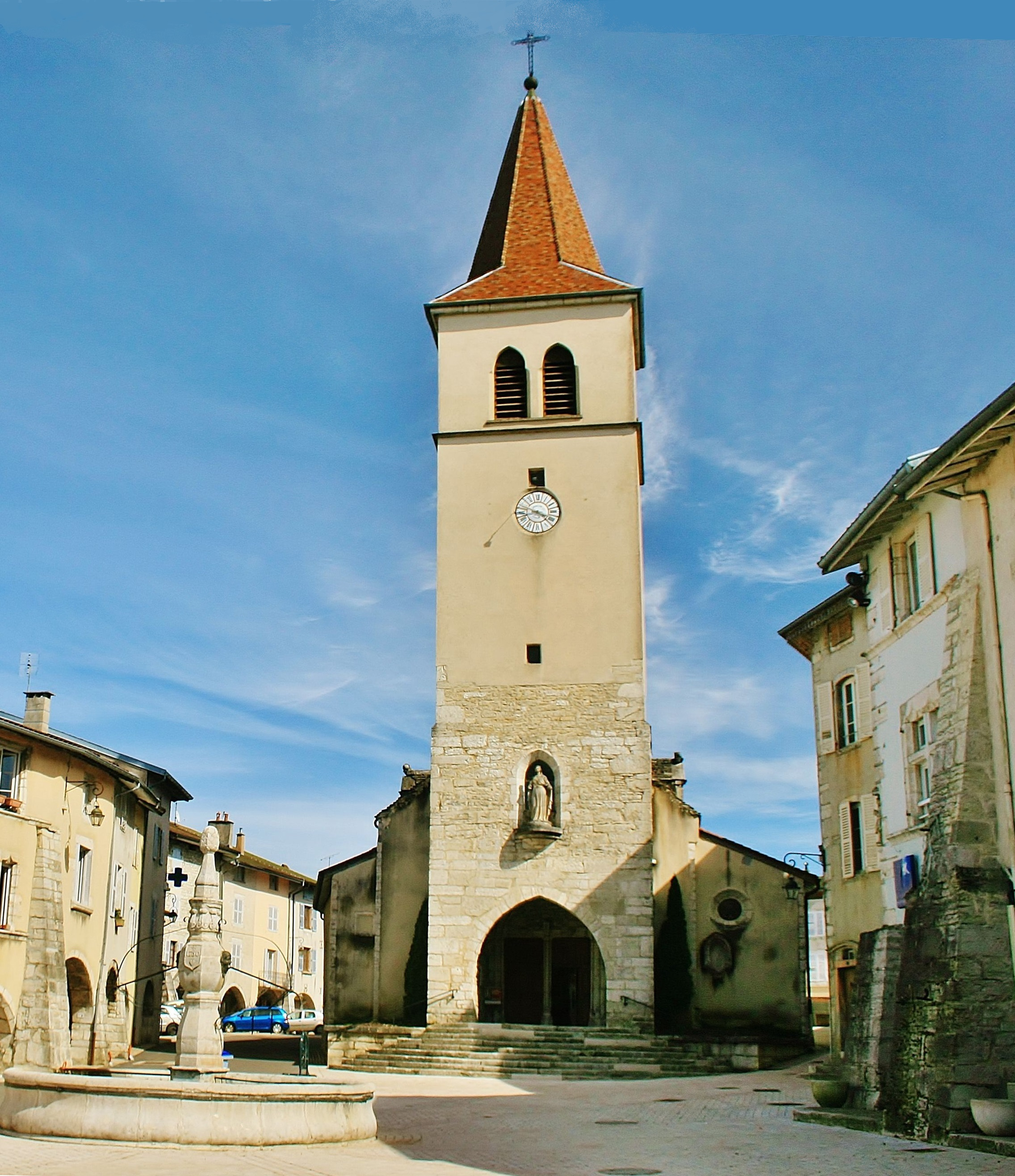
- The church in Arinthod

- Coat of arms
- Location of Arinthod
- Location within France Location within Bourgogne-Franche-Comté
- Coordinates: 46°23′38″N 5°34′03″E
- Country: France
- Region: Bourgogne-Franche-Comté
- Department: Jura
- Arrondissement: Lons-le-Saunier
- Canton: Moirans-en-Montagne
- Intercommunality: Terre d'Émeraude Communauté

Government
  - Mayor (2020–2026): Jean-Charles Grosdidier
- Area^{1}: 27.02 km^{2} (10.43 sq mi)
- Highest elevation: 841 m (2,759 ft)
- Lowest elevation: 335 m (1,099 ft)
- Population (2023): 1,149
  - Density: 42.52/km^{2} (110.1/sq mi)
- Time zone: UTC+01:00 (CET)
  - Summer (DST): UTC+02:00 (CEST)
- INSEE/Postal code: 39016 /39240
- ^{1} French Land Register data, which excludes lakes, ponds, glaciers > 1 km^{2} (0.386 sq mi or 247 acres) and river estuaries.

Arinthod (French pronunciation: [aʁɛ̃to]) is a commune in the Jura department in the region of Bourgogne-Franche-Comté in eastern France. On 1 January 2018, the former commune Chisséria was merged into Arinthod.

== Population ==
Historical population
Year	Pop.	±% p.a.
1968	1,167	—
1975	1,119	−0.60%
1982	1,143	+0.30%
1990	1,210	+0.71%
1999	1,285	+0.67%
2007	1,256	−0.28%
2012	1,249	−0.11%
2017	1,114	−2.26%
2023	1,149	+0.52%
Source: INSEE

Population data refer to the area corresponding with the commune as of January 2025.

== See also ==
- Communes of the Jura department
