= Foncine-le-Haut =

Commune in Bourgogne-Franche-Comté, France

- Commune
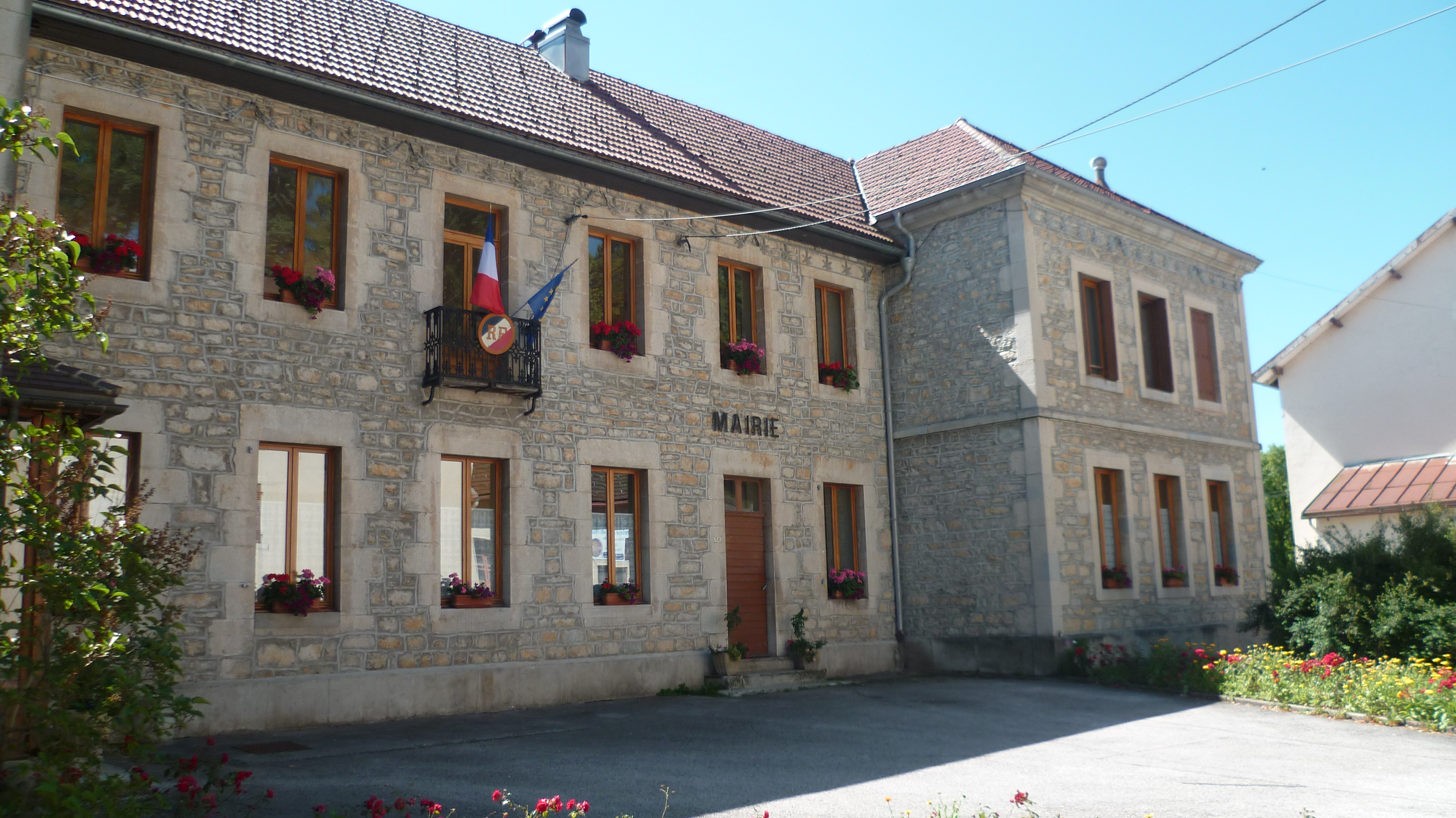
- The town hall in Foncine-le-Haut
- Location of Foncine-le-Haut
- Location within France Location within Bourgogne-Franche-Comté
- Coordinates: 46°39′36″N 6°04′27″E
- Country: France
- Region: Bourgogne-Franche-Comté
- Department: Jura
- Arrondissement: Lons-le-Saunier
- Canton: Saint-Laurent-en-Grandvaux

Government
  - Mayor (2020–2026): Geneviève Moreau
- Area^{1}: 28.95 km^{2} (11.18 sq mi)
- Highest elevation: 1,212 m (3,976 ft)
- Lowest elevation: 750 m (2,460 ft)
- Population (2023): 1,112
  - Density: 38.41/km^{2} (99.48/sq mi)
- Time zone: UTC+01:00 (CET)
  - Summer (DST): UTC+02:00 (CEST)
- INSEE/Postal code: 39228 /39460
- ^{1} French Land Register data, which excludes lakes, ponds, glaciers > 1 km^{2} (0.386 sq mi or 247 acres) and river estuaries.

Foncine-le-Haut (French pronunciation: [fɔ̃sin lə o]) is a commune in the Jura department in Bourgogne-Franche-Comté in eastern France.

== Population ==
Historical population
Year	Pop.	±% p.a.
1968	785	—
1975	710	−1.42%
1982	773	+1.22%
1990	855	+1.27%
1999	945	+1.12%
2007	1,024	+1.01%
2012	1,017	−0.14%
2017	1,063	+0.89%
2023	1,112	+0.75%
Source: INSEE

== See also ==
- Communes of the Jura department
