= Foncine-le-Bas =

Commune in Bourgogne-Franche-Comté, France

- Commune
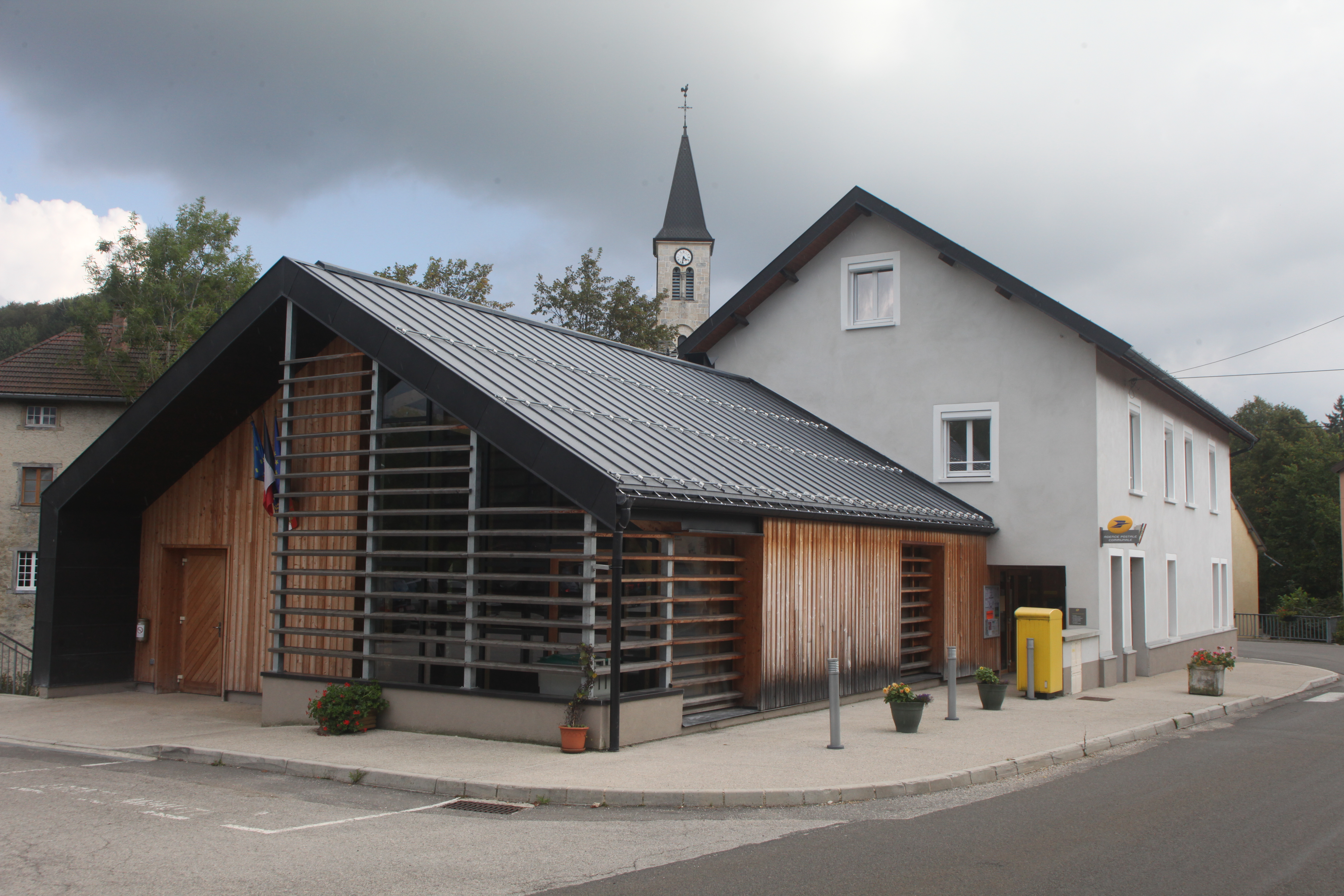
- The town hall in Foncine-le-Bas
- Location of Foncine-le-Bas
- Location within France Location within Bourgogne-Franche-Comté
- Coordinates: 46°38′16″N 6°01′51″E
- Country: France
- Region: Bourgogne-Franche-Comté
- Department: Jura
- Arrondissement: Lons-le-Saunier
- Canton: Saint-Laurent-en-Grandvaux

Government
  - Mayor (2020–2026): Jacques Gagneux
- Area^{1}: 9.29 km^{2} (3.59 sq mi)
- Highest elevation: 1,181 m (3,875 ft)
- Lowest elevation: 730 m (2,400 ft)
- Population (2023): 203
  - Density: 21.9/km^{2} (56.6/sq mi)
- Time zone: UTC+01:00 (CET)
  - Summer (DST): UTC+02:00 (CEST)
- INSEE/Postal code: 39227 /39520
- ^{1} French Land Register data, which excludes lakes, ponds, glaciers > 1 km^{2} (0.386 sq mi or 247 acres) and river estuaries.

Foncine-le-Bas (French pronunciation: [fɔ̃sin lə ba]) is a commune in the Jura department in Bourgogne-Franche-Comté in eastern France.

== Population ==
Historical population
Year	Pop.	±% p.a.
1968	232	—
1975	229	−0.19%
1982	191	−2.56%
1990	175	−1.09%
1999	182	+0.44%
2007	221	+2.46%
2012	197	−2.27%
2017	192	−0.51%
2023	203	+0.93%
Source: INSEE

== See also ==
- Communes of the Jura department
