= Cure (river) =

River in central France

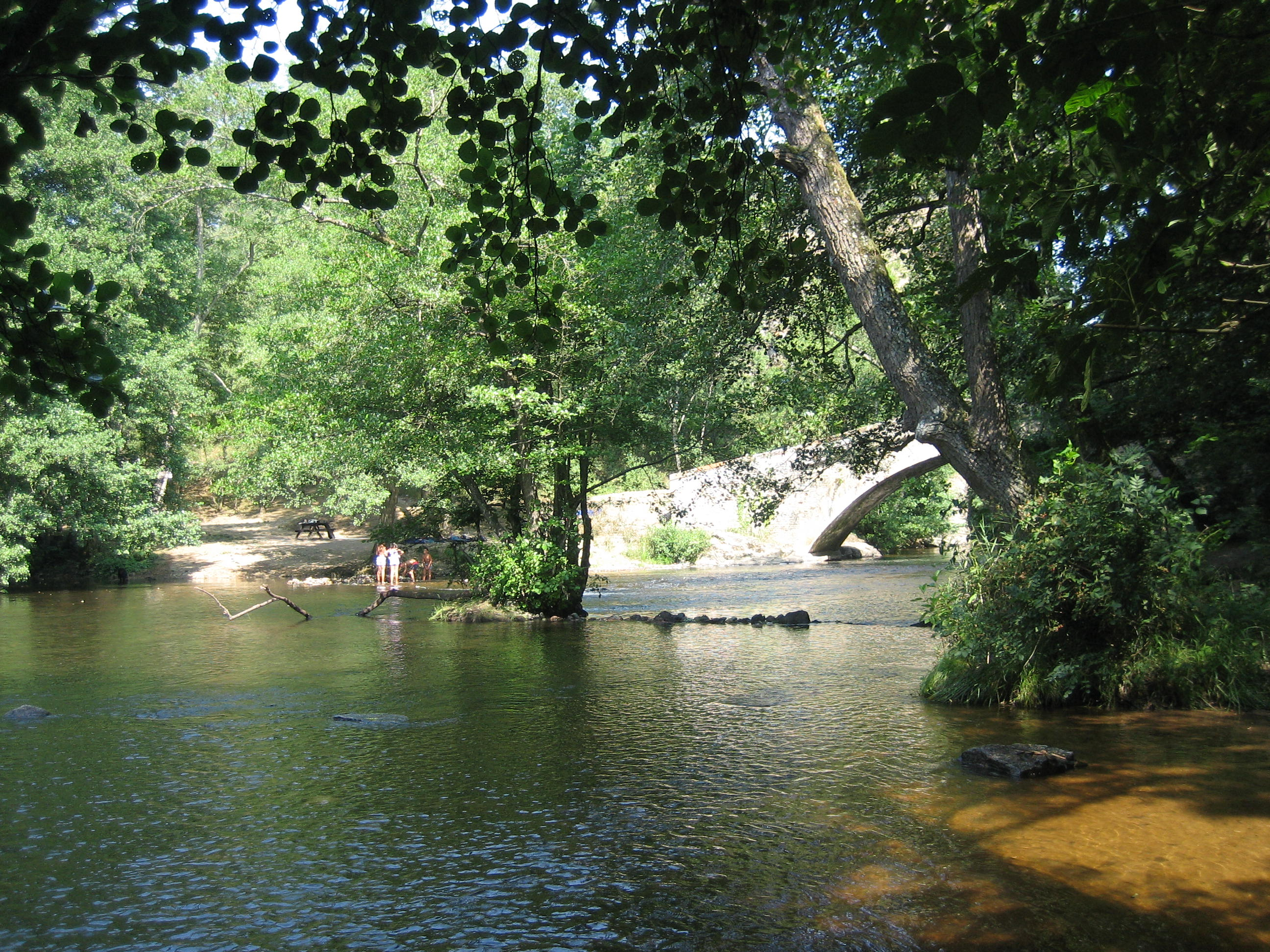

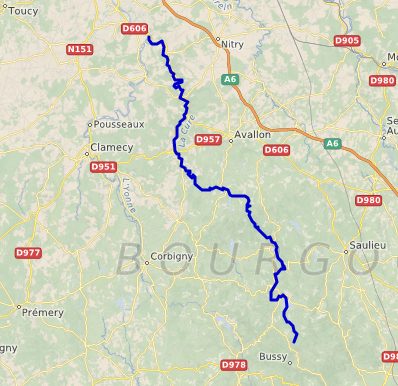

Location
- Country: France

Physical characteristics
- Source
  - location: Morvan
- Mouth
  - location: Yonne
  - coordinates: 47°40′31″N 3°41′19″E
- Length: 113 km (70 mi)

Basin features
- Progression: Yonne→ Seine→ English Channel

The Cure (French pronunciation: [kyʁ]) is a 113 km (70 mi) long river in central France, a right-bank tributary of the Yonne. Its source is in Gien-sur-Cure, in the Morvan hills. It flows into the Yonne at Cravant near Vermenton.

== Communes crossed ==
It crosses the following departments and towns: (from its source to its confluence):

- Anost (source, Saône-et-Loire)
- Planchez (Nièvre)
- Gien-sur-Cure (Nièvre)
- Moux-en-Morvan (lac des Settons, Nièvre)
- Montsauche-les-Settons (lac des Settons, Nièvre)
- Gouloux (Nièvre)
- Saint-Brisson (Nièvre)
- Dun-les-Places (Nièvre)
- Quarré-les-Tombes (Yonne)
- Marigny-l'Eglise (lac du Crescent, Nièvre)
- Saint-Germain-des-Champs (Yonne)
- Chastellux-sur-Cure (Yonne)
- Saint-André-en-Morvan (Nièvre)
- Domecy-sur-Cure (Yonne)
- Pierre-Perthuis (Yonne)
- Foissy-les-Vezelay (Yonne)
- Saint-Père (near Vézelay, Yonne)
- Asquins (Yonne)
- Montillot (Yonne)
- Givry (Yonne)
- Blannay (Yonne)
- Sermizelles (Yonne)
- Voutenay-sur-Cure (Yonne)
- Saint-Moré (Yonne)
- Arcy-sur-Cure (Yonne)
- Bessy-sur-Cure (Yonne)
- Lucy-sur-Cure (Yonne)
- Vermenton (Yonne)
- Accolay (Yonne)
- Cravant (Yonne)
