= Château de Chastellux =

Castle in Bourgogne-Franche-Comté, France

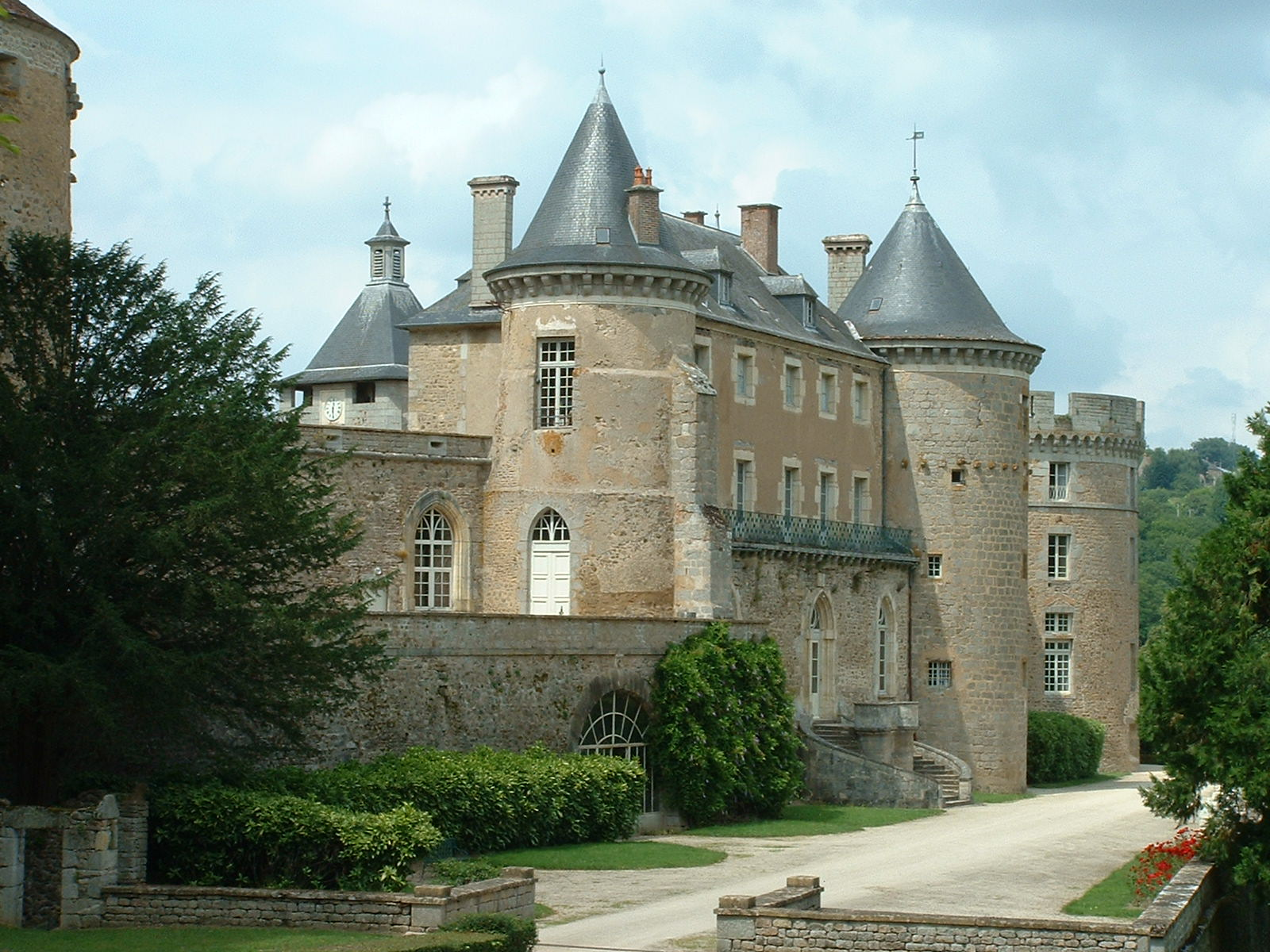
- Château de Chastellux, Yonne

- Location within France
- 47°23′32″N 3°53′24″E

History
- Built: 11, 13, 15, and 18th century
- Original use: Castra

Site notes
- Restored: 18th and 20th century
- Current use: Tourist attraction and historical research
- Owner: Privately owned

Monument historique
- Designated: 1925 (Château); 1976 (Tower of Saint-Jean); 1989 (nearby farm buildings, the terrace, commons, and basements)

Château de Chastellux (French pronunciation: [ʃato də ʃatly]) is a French castle with elements from the eleventh, thirteenth, fifteenth and nineteenth centuries. It is located in Chastellux-sur-Cure in the Yonne, Bourgogne-Franche-Comté.

This castle is still inhabited by the family who built it, a rarity in France. The oldest existing part of the building, the Saint-Jean tower, was built c. 1080 AD.

The main building was the first part to be registered as a monument historique in 1925. The Saint-Jean tower and the surrounding buildings were later classified in 1976 and 1989, respectively.

== History ==
The house of Chastellux takes its name from a place called Castrum Lucii located on the banks of the Cure, 15 km from Avallon. Initially, the building in its original state was a Roman fort made of wood and stone. There remains many traces of Roman influence in the region, including the mosaic of Chagnats found in the fields and currently on display at the museum of Avallonnais, Avallon.

=== Middle Ages ===
The oldest evidence of presence of the lords of Chastellux on the current site of the castle is an account of a hearing at "the ancient Saint Jean tower in 1116". The hearing was about a property rights dispute between local barons and clergy of the Abbey of Molesme.

For ten centuries, the castle of Chastellux did not stop growing, embellished and restored by successive generations of the family.

Planted on a rocky peak surmounting the Cure, its strategic location helped to protect the castle from attack. Located on the borders of the Yonne and Nièvre, the fortress hosted armies that came to defend the borders of Burgundy, being an independent duchy at the time.

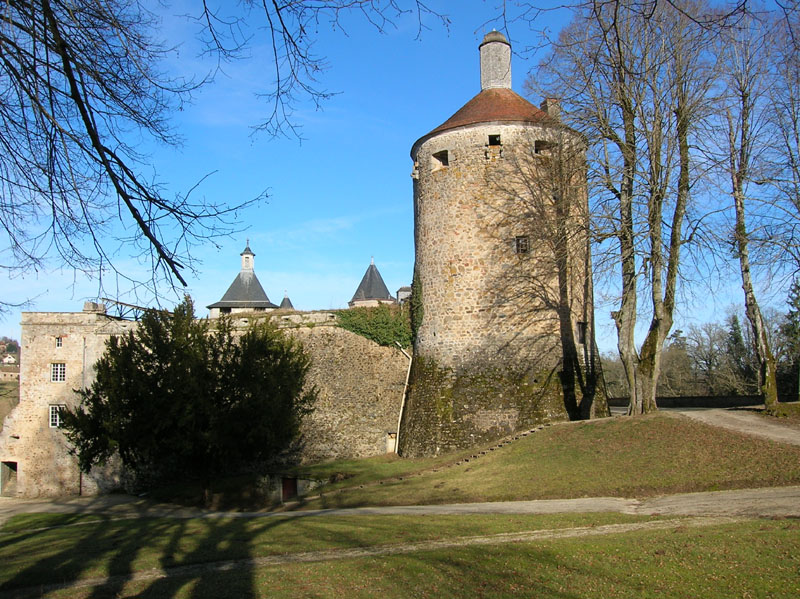
The Tower of Saint Jean

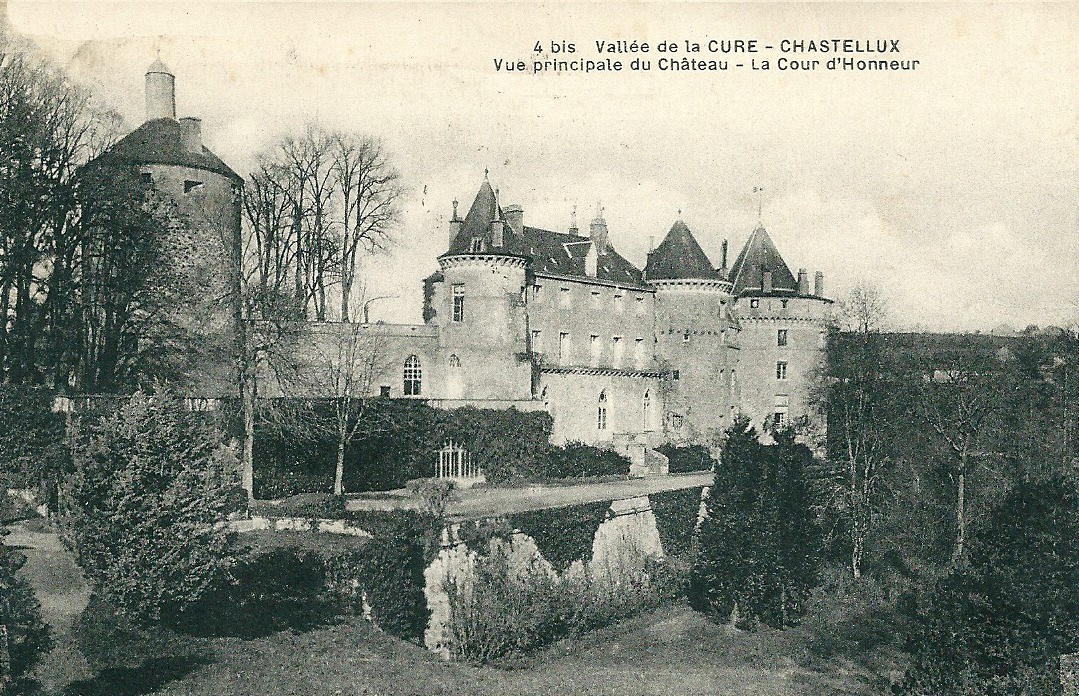
Main view of the Castle and courtyard c. 1925.

In the twelfth century, the castle became a fortress, composed of tall towers linked by a thick battlement and guarded by a walkway. Wooden buildings are backed along the walls. They are used for livestock housing and the storage of animal feed. Comfort was nonexistent and homes played a very minor role compared to the "defensive" role of the fortress. The tower of St. John is the last remnant of this fortress. The tower, one of the oldest in Europe, consists of five levels. The staircase leading to the floors was cut into the thickness of the wall (a thickness of 3.5 meters at ground level). On the second floor is a prison officer and a dungeon accessed through an opening in the floor. The roof is topped with a lantern containing the warning bell, to alert the castle inhabitants of impending danger.

For additional protection, there was a second wall with several smaller towers, two of which still exist today. A ditch joining the two valleys close this second wall is no longer present.

In the 13th century, out of necessity, a larger building was built. The year 1240 was inscribed on stone walls, providing a date of construction of the guard room, which is the second oldest structure (after the tower of Saint-Jean).

The scaffolding of tower of the Ermitage and the Archives still exists today. On the west side a keep was created as well as an archives tour and the defensive tower of Amboise.

Throughout the history of the lords Chastellux remained near the Dukes of Burgundy and fought with them especially during the fall of Paris in 1417. The marshall of France, Claude de Chastellux defeated the Franco-Scottish army at the Battle of Cravant in 1423. This victory allowed him to receive several honorary privileges, such as the title of first hereditary canon of the Auxerre Chapter. He is buried in the chapel within the castle.

Over the last fifteen years of his life, the Marshal of Chastellux enlarged the second main building located between the tower of the Archives and the bastion of the tower of Amboise and built the Octagonal Tower and the castle chapel.

=== Modern times ===
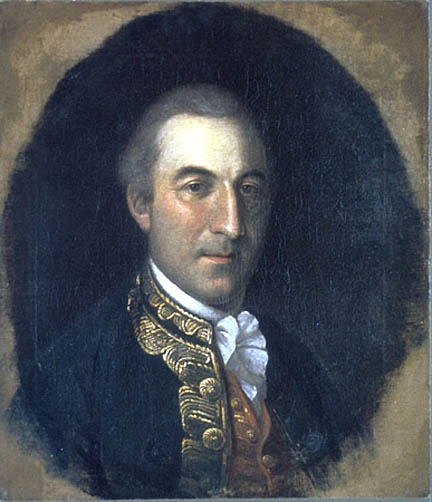
François-Jean de Chastellux, painted by Charles Willson Peale

In 1592, Olivier de Chastellux, Quarré Baron, Viscount of Avallon, and governor of Cravant, Yonne, raises the military bastion located at the end of the castle near the Tower of Amboise, Tower of Amboise was converted into a living quarters at this time. He also built a terrace that surrounded the castle.

Until the end of the reign of Louis XIII, the castle remained a fortress with a large garrison. In 1615 the Prince of Conde ordered the establishment of a company of 100 trained infantry and a company of 60 cavalry and the establishment of its castle and place of Chastellux. The castle site made for a strategic location for the defense of Burgundy.

Hercules, son of Oliver, was elected to the nobility of Burgundy States in 1618. In 1621, to demonstrate his esteem and gratitude for services rendered and for those of his father, Louis XIII meets the various strongholds in Chastellux. He meets with the lordship of Chastellux, the barony of Quarré-les-Tombes, Yonne and the Viscount of Avallon in county of Chastellux.

In 1780, François-Jean de Chastellux participates in the American Revolutionary War with George Washington. He explored the country and studied its diversity and later published reference books on his travels. He entered the Académie française in 1775. He is also known for being one of the first in France to receive and successfully test the vaccine against smallpox.

In 1786, on the death of his father-in-law, the Duke of Duras, Henri-Georges the count of Chastellux took command of the horsemen in honor to Princess Victoire, daughter of Louis XV, and begins his service. In anticipation of looming threats of the French Revolution, the princesses of France flee Italy in February 1791. They asked the Chastellux to accompany them, while the children of Henri-Georges stay in Autun.

The castle suffered considerable damage during the revolution. Revolutionaries vandalized the castle: all the old medieval weapons were stolen in 1792, the winery was looted and auctioned. On 5 August 1793, the furniture and archives were seized, paintings, priceless, are burned on August 10 at place Saint-Julien Avallon, currently the site of City Hall. The furniture was stolen, sold, and dispersed. All traces of the family blazon, found on woodwork, painting or a decorative element were promptly destroyed.

=== Contemporary times ===
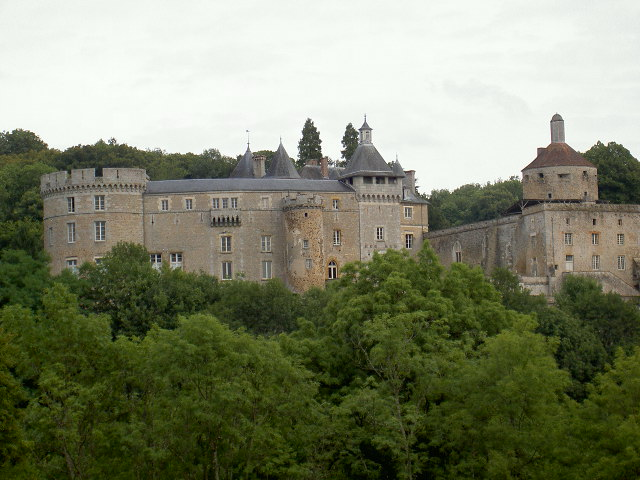
The Chateau de Chastellux (west view)

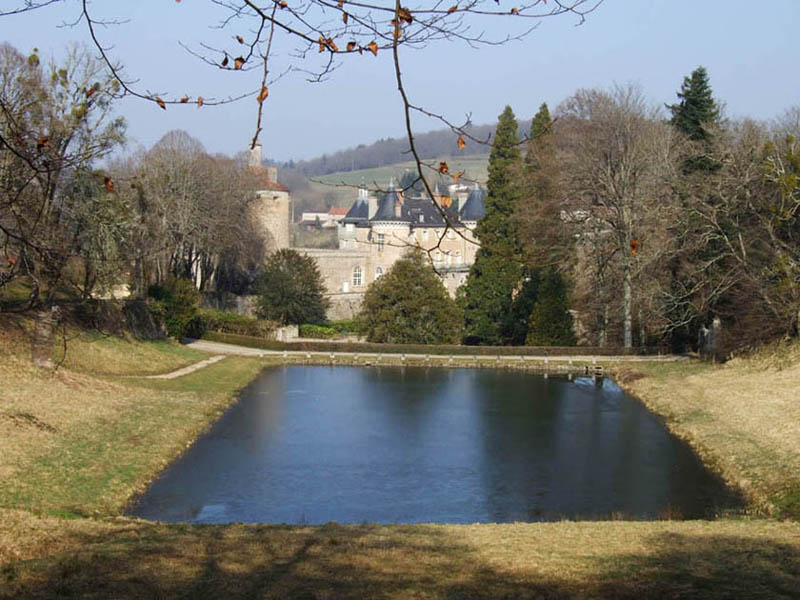
The park of the Château de Chastellux (east view)

After nineteen years of exile in Italy, the Earl and Countess of Chastellux did not return to inhabit the castle at the end of the Empire (1810). Their daughter, Georgine Chastellux became the wife of Charles de la Bédoyère. Charles de la Bédoyère helps Napoleon from his return from the island of Elba and consequently Louis XVIII makes charges for his arrest. After the fall of Waterloo, Louis XVIII shot Charles La Bédoyère on August 19, 1815, in Paris, despite the friendship between the monarch and the house of Chastellux.

Under the Restoration, the brother of Georgine, César Laurent Chastellux renovates the castle and the grounds. He removed the decorative additions of the eighteenth century and fully restored its medieval decor.

In 1940, General Jean de Lattre de Tassigny briefly took over the castle with his staff and forced the Earl and Countess of Chastellux to leave. However, the Earl and Countess of Chastellux return after three months of absence. In 1975: a chimney fire set fire to the roof and attic. The tower of Amboise still bears the traces of this fire, with the absence of a roof.

Several films were shot at the Château de Chastellux during the 20th century. These include Mon oncle Benjamin (1969), L'épingle noire (1982), Le fantôme du lac (2004).

== Protection ==
The castle, not including the tour of Saint-Jean, was registered as a monument historique since 10 November 1925. The Saint-Jean tower has been classified as historical monument since 10 November 1976. The collection of facades and roofs of the outbuildings, terraces and basement, were classified as a historic monument on 17 February 1989. The castle and its surroundings are a protected site and a site registered by order of 9 September 1935.

== Visiting ==
The castle is privately owned but has been open to visitors since 2008.

== See also ==
List of castles in France
