= Opus Gothique =

Building project in France

View of Opus Gothique

Opus Gothique construction site

Opus Gothique is a building under construction in the Gothic style in the Morvan region of France. The project is being carried out using the traditional techniques of medieval cathedral builders.

The project is an initiative of Donald E. Russell (born 1927), a French-American paleontologist who previously worked for the Muséum national d'histoire naturelle in Paris. In the years leading up to his retirement, he studied Gothic art and architecture at the Sorbonne. Russell began carving stones himself in the 1990s. Construction of the foundation started in 2008.

In 2019, the association Opus Gothique was founded due to the growth of the project.

Sam Russell (left) with volunteers

Sam Russell, Donald Russell's son, serves as president and uses the association to raise funds and donations to help complete the project. After decades of work, 9,000 stones have been carved by Donald Russell.

Basement of Opus Gothique

The basement level is completed and contains vaulted halls.
