= Marigny-l'Église =

- Commune
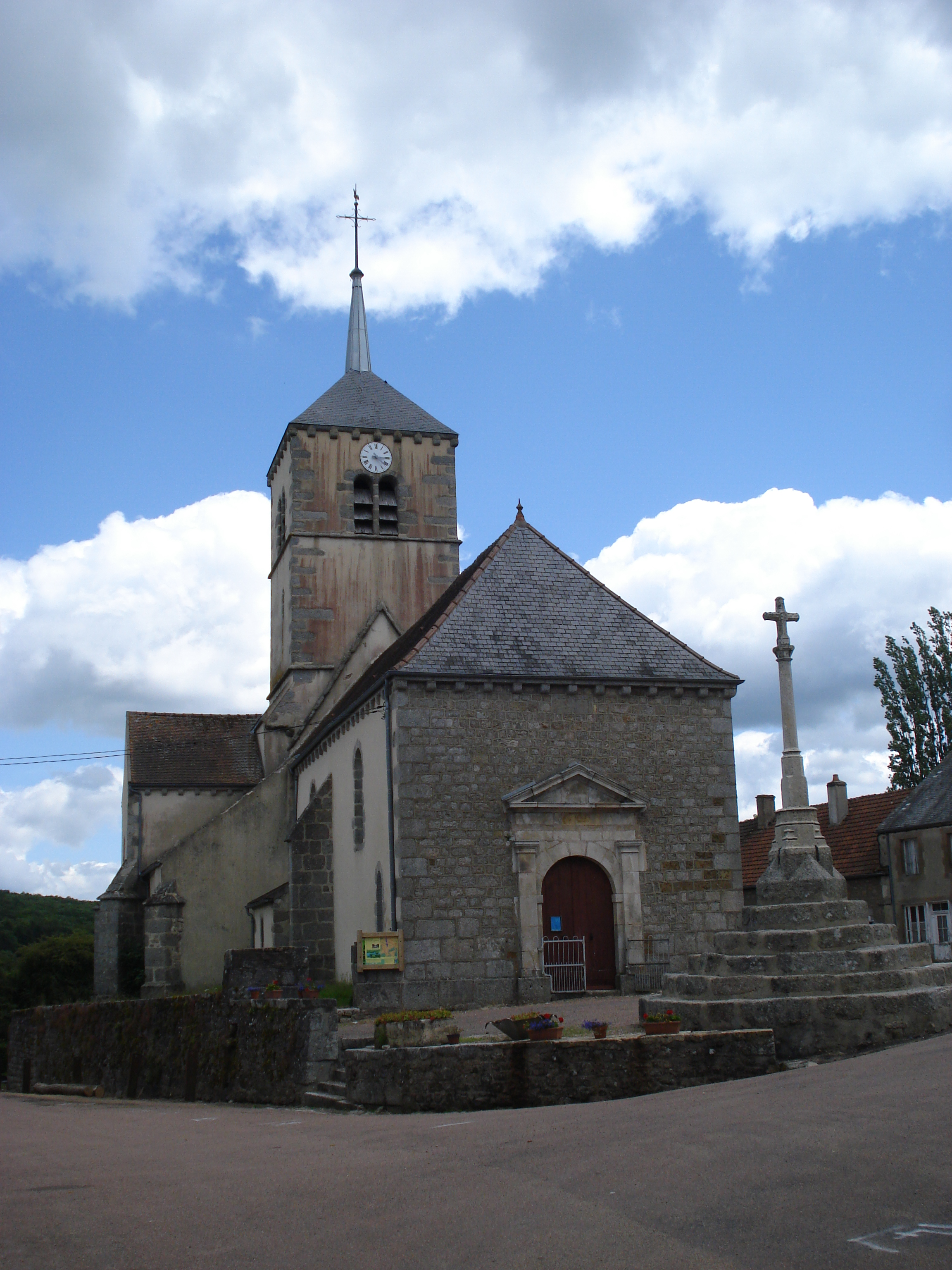
- The church in Marigny-l'Église
- Location of Marigny-l'Église
- Location within France Location within Bourgogne-Franche-Comté
- Coordinates: 47°21′20″N 3°56′15″E
- Country: France
- Region: Bourgogne-Franche-Comté
- Department: Nièvre
- Arrondissement: Château-Chinon (Ville)
- Canton: Corbigny

Government
  - Mayor (2020–2026): Philippe Dauvergne
- Area^{1}: 38.80 km^{2} (14.98 sq mi)
- Highest elevation: 618 m (2,028 ft)
- Lowest elevation: 270 m (890 ft)
- Population (2023): 294
  - Density: 7.58/km^{2} (19.6/sq mi)
- Time zone: UTC+01:00 (CET)
  - Summer (DST): UTC+02:00 (CEST)
- INSEE/Postal code: 58157 /58140
- ^{1} French Land Register data, which excludes lakes, ponds, glaciers > 1 km^{2} (0.386 sq mi or 247 acres) and river estuaries.

Marigny-l'Église (French pronunciation: [maʁiɲi leɡliz]) is a commune in the Nièvre department in central France

== Etymology ==
The name Marigny can be traced to the Gallo-Roman Era. It is derived from the Latin toponym Mariniacus which comes from the cognomen Marinus. Marigny was referenced in 13th-century documents from the bishopric of Autun where it was called Marrigni. Under the Ancien régime it was referred to as Marigny-en-Morvand or Marigny-l'Eglise-en-Morvand.

== Geography ==
Marigny-l'Église is located in the Morvan massif. It is within the bounds of the protected area of Morvan Regional Natural Park. The Lac du Crescent is partially within the municipal area. There are several hiking trails in the commune.

== History ==
Marigny-l'Église was known to be inhabited during the Celtic Era; Celtic stones called the Roches-des-Fées (lit. Fairy Rocks) are located nearby and flint axes and utensils have been found.

A ruined Roman villa is located near Marigny as evidenced by pottery debris, edged tiles, and medals.

In 885, a band of viking pillagers were attacked and defeated in the forests of the upper Morvand by an army raised by Ribaud, Bishop of Auxerre. Axes and helmets have been found. Local legend refers to a granite outcropping as the Tomb of the Viking King after this battle.

In the 13th century the Marigny was split into two fiefs.

The house of Chastellux obtained ownership over Marigny in 1309, under whose provision it remained until the French Revolution.

A tile factory operated in Marigny during the 19th century.

Sixty inhabitants of Marigny were lost as casualties in the First World War. Multiple buildings were occupied by Germans during the Second World War.

== Places of Interest ==
=== Church ===
The parish church at the heart of the village was constructed in the 12th century and was dedicated to Saint-Pierre-aux-Liens. It was enlarged from the 15th to 17th centuries. The church and some statues were defaced during the French Revolution. The church expanded in the 19th century with a larger nave, altar, and chapel.

=== Château ===
In 1800 a modern château was built by timber seller Léonard Houdaille who became a nouveau riche during the Revolution. The two-story mansion features a garden, outbuildings, and icehouse. During the Second World War the mansion was occupied by the Germans as a command center.

=== Crucifix Monument ===
On the road from Marigny-l'Église to Marigny-la-Ville is an old crucifix carved from granite. It features a depiction of crucified Christ on one side while the back side shows the Virgin Mary with infant Christ. It is nearly 5 meters tall.

== See also ==
- Communes of the Nièvre department
- Parc naturel régional du Morvan
