= Lucy-sur-Cure =

- Commune
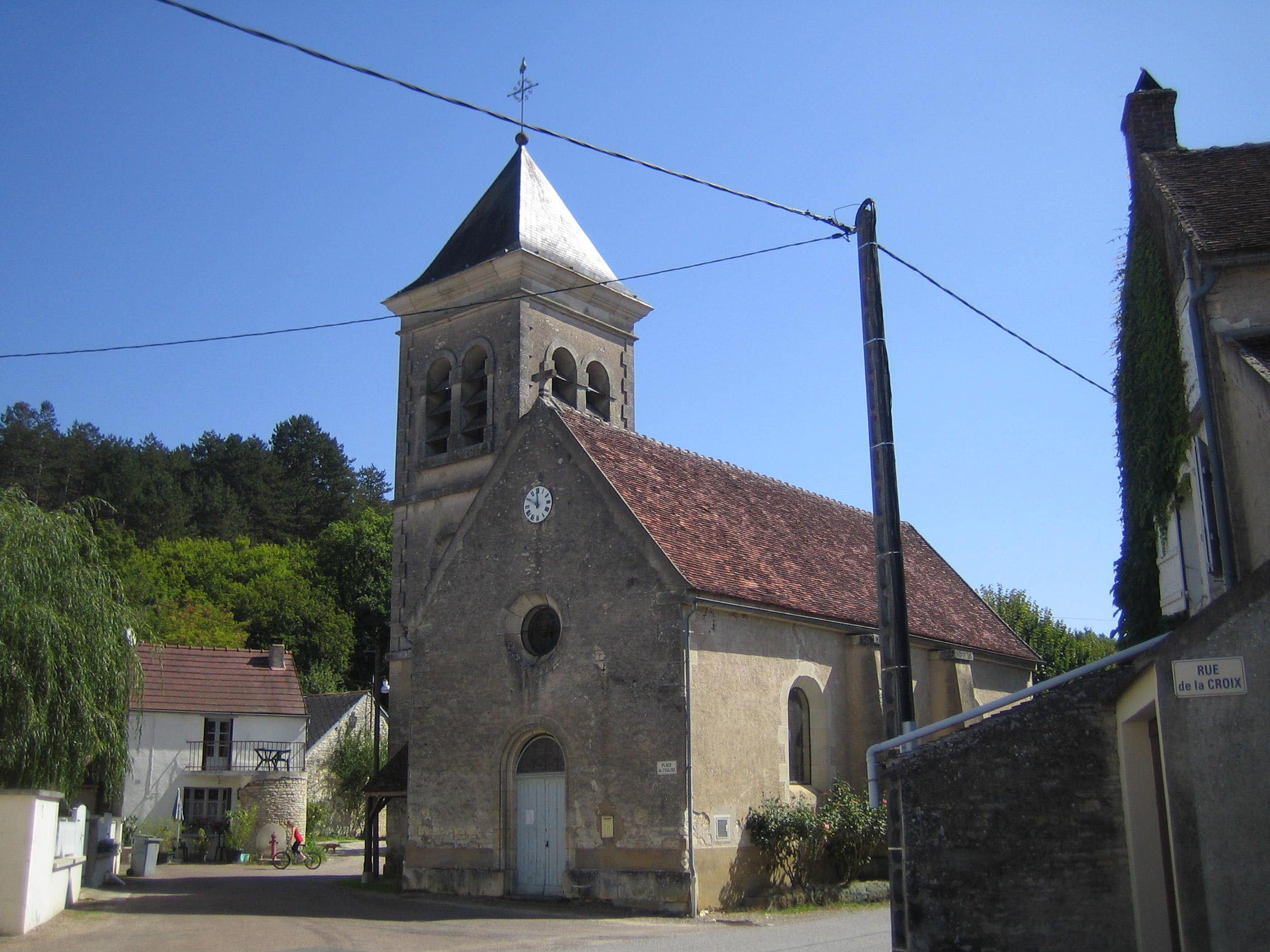
- The church of Essert in Lucy-sur-Cure
- Location of Lucy-sur-Cure
- Location within France Location within Bourgogne-Franche-Comté
- Coordinates: 47°37′46″N 3°44′38″E
- Country: France
- Region: Bourgogne-Franche-Comté
- Department: Yonne
- Arrondissement: Auxerre
- Canton: Joux-la-Ville

Government
  - Mayor (2020–2026): Frédéric Moiselet-Parquet
- Area^{1}: 10.58 km^{2} (4.08 sq mi)
- Highest elevation: 241 m (791 ft)
- Lowest elevation: 117 m (384 ft)
- Population (2023): 210
  - Density: 20/km^{2} (51/sq mi)
- Time zone: UTC+01:00 (CET)
  - Summer (DST): UTC+02:00 (CEST)
- INSEE/Postal code: 89233 /89270
- ^{1} French Land Register data, which excludes lakes, ponds, glaciers > 1 km^{2} (0.386 sq mi or 247 acres) and river estuaries.

Lucy-sur-Cure (French pronunciation: [lysi syʁ kyʁ], literally Lucy on Cure) is a commune in the Yonne department in Bourgogne-Franche-Comté in north-central France. In January 1973, it absorbed the former communes Essert and Bessy-sur-Cure. Bessy-sur-Cure became an independent commune again in 1982.

== See also ==
- Communes of the Yonne department
