= Water jousting =

Sport played primarily in France, Switzerland, and Germany

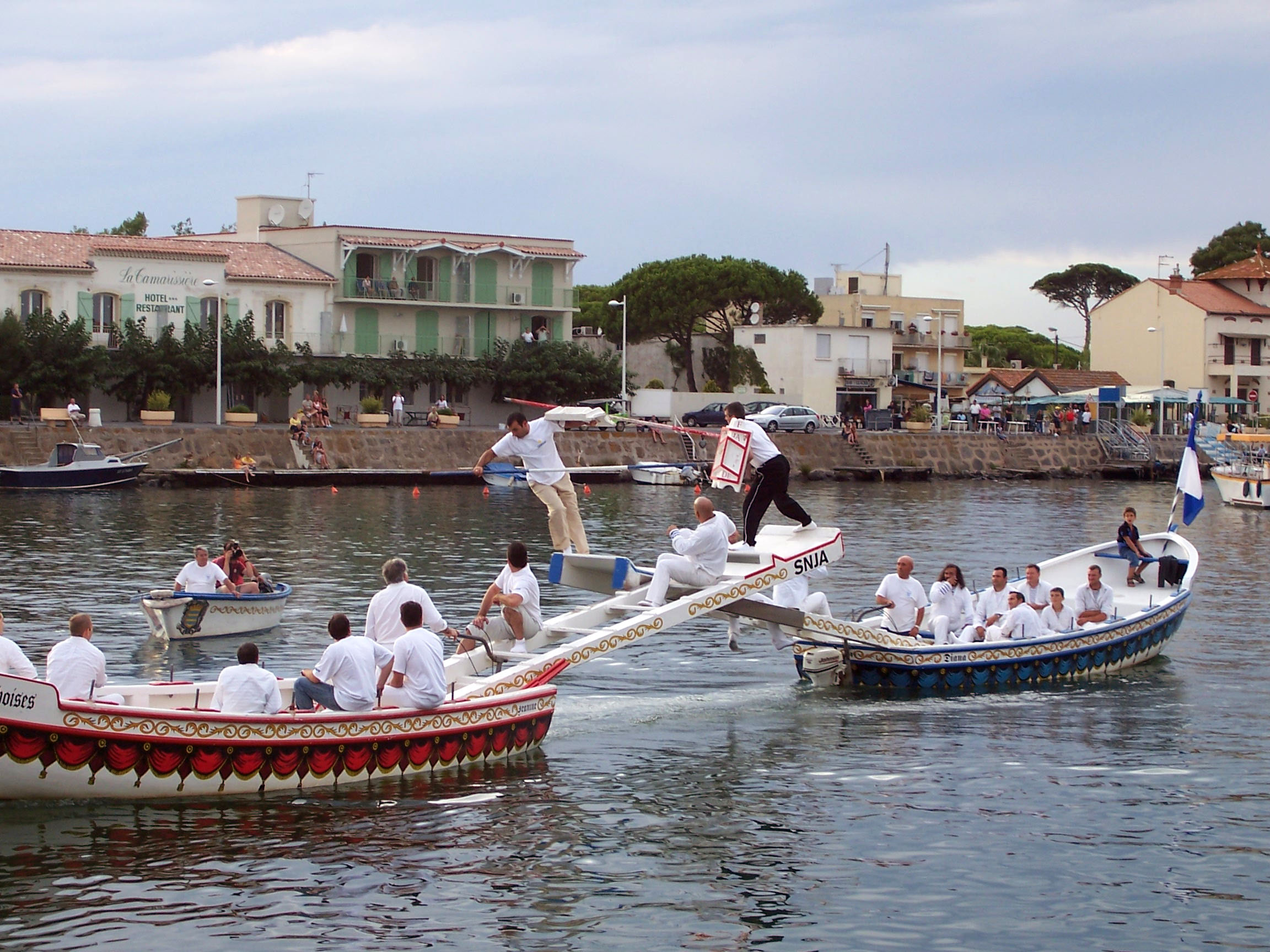
Jousting on the Hérault river in Agde

Water jousting is a form of jousting where two jousters, carrying a lance and protected only by a shield, stand on a platform on the stern of a boat. The aim of the sport is to send the opponent into the water whilst maintaining one's own balance on the platform. The boat is propelled by oarsmen or, in some cases, a motor may be used. The sport is played principally in France, but it also exists in parts of Switzerland and Germany.

The jousters stand on a wooden platform on their boats. As the two competing boats draw level with each other, each jouster, protected by their shield, uses their lance to push their opponent off the platform and into the water. The exact rules of the contest vary from region to region and country to country.

== Ancient world ==
The oldest representations of water jousting have been found on bas-reliefs dating from the Ancient Egyptians (2780–2380 BC). It would seem however, that these relate more to a form of brawling than a leisure activity; given that the jousters are wearing no form of protection and carry gaffs armed with two points at their end.

Evidence of jousting is subsequently found in Ancient Greece. The Greeks introduced the practice into Sicily where the Latins, great lovers of all kinds of spectacle, immediately adopted it. There are countless signs of jousting in the Roman Empire, especially during staged naumachia (literally "naval combat"). The latter featured naval re-enactments and other water-sports that took place in arenas designed to be flooded for the purpose. In all likelihood, the Romans introduced these types of games throughout their empire. Evidence for this comes from the description of a fête held at Strasbourg in 303 in honour of Emperor Diocletian. Some historians argue, however, for an introduction of the games from the foundation of Massilia, a Greek colony founded in 570 BC and later to become the French city of Marseille.

== Development in France ==
After Roman times, there is no record of water jousting until the twelfth century. It is possible that the sport survived during the intervening period in communities close to water, but it is not mentioned anywhere. The oldest document dating from the post Roman period in France refers to a jousting tournament in Lyon on 2 June 1177, to commemorate the millennium of the Christian martyrs of Lyon and Vienna. Another document tells us that "in 1270 in Aigues-Mortes, crusaders, soldiers and sailors, awaiting embarkation for the Holy Land with King Louis IX (Saint Louis), faced off in single combat mounted on small boats.

Documents both written and illustrated become more numerous in the fifteenth and sixteenth centuries, citing games in Sologne, in Toulon, and more generally throughout the Mediterranean coast. On the Languedoc coast in Southern France, jousts have been practised regularly since the seventeenth century. There is evidence that the inauguration of the port of Sète in 1666 gave rise to a jousting tournament. In the Rhone-Alps region, it was reported 13 April 1507 that the fishermen of St Vincent (Lyon) jousted on the Saône at St. Jean to entertain Queen Anne of Brittany and her people. In 1536, a show of jousting is given by the sailors in Saint-Just-Saint-Rambert (Loire), in honour of François I. Games are also held on the Saône in 1548 for Henri II and Catherine of Medici.

The nineteenth century was a watershed in the history of jousting on the Rhone with the creation of certain societies. The original object of these societies was not primarily concerned with the practice of jousting. Rather, they were societies of sailors who came together to bring relief to residents during the frequent floods of the Rhone. They practised jousting at local festivals, thus perpetuating the tradition passed down from generation to generation by these proud watermen.

In 1899, the Federal Union of French Societies of Swimming and Rescue was created. The Union held the first jousting championship in France in 1901 on the Tête d'or Lake in Lyon, although this was somewhat rudimentary. In 1905, the Union was replaced by the National Federation of Swimming and Rescue, which also holds regional championships.

A French postage stamp depicting water jousting was issued in 1958.

It was not until 1960 that the game was officially recognized as a sport by the government. The current federation (Federation of French Jousting and Water Rescue) was born in 1964 following a strong disagreement with the former federation, which did not sufficiently develop the game as a sport.

Water Jousting in Palavas-les-Flots

The sport is currently practised throughout France, notably in Languedoc, Provence, the Rhone Valley, around Paris and in Alsace. Jousting festivals are also held in Cognac, Accolay, Merville and in Brittany. Each region has its own methods of jousting and its own rules of engagement.
