= François Brochet =

French painter

- Born: 3 January 1925; Paris
- Died: 10 August 2001 (aged 76)
- Known for: sculpture, painting, print, tapestry

François Brochet (3 January 1925 – 10 August 2001) was a French sculptor, painter and printer. Throughout his career he had many exhibitions in Paris, Chicago, New York, and Los Angeles. The French Government made several purchases of Brochet's works for the Yonne Department's Auxerre commune, while numerous works exist in private collections. Over 54 years he produced more than a thousand sculptures.

== Early career ==
François Brochet was born 3 January 1925 in Paris. His father, Henry Brochet, was a painter and playwright. In 1942 the seventeen-year-old Brochet met Le Corbusier in Vézelay, and was influenced by Le Corbusier's doctrine: "drawing gives you true freedom".

Brochet began to use photography and woodcut as an artistic response to puppetry, theatre programmes, poetic texts, Japanese prints, the 19th century illustrations of Icard and Showman, the 20th-century engravings of P. E. Plowman, Roland Oudot and Jean Hélion, and the work of his contemporary, Jean Dewasne.

His emphasis in drawing was in composition and mastery of line, which informed his work in carved and polychrome sculpture, and in appliqué tapestries. In 1946 he produced tapestries for St Stephen's Cathedral, and sculpted Marie Noel, Cadet Roussel and Retif of Brittany. In 1948 had his first exhibition in Paris.

== Later years ==
In 1983 Brochet opened his summerhouse at 52 Rue St Etienne, Vézelay, the place where he produced many of his drawings and paintings. That same year he gave the city of Auxerre the sculpture group, Massacre of the Innocents, a piece influenced by his experiences in World War II.

After he died in 2001 Brochet's summerhouse became a gallery for his paintings, sculptures and engravings. In the basement of the 12th-century building are displayed various ceramics he had collected from the 1950s to the 1970s, from Vallauris and La Puisaye, and works of the Zazous potters of Accolay. More than 100 of his polychrome wood sculptures are housed at the Museum of Visitation at Auxerre, a chapel converted to a museum.

== Exhibitions ==
- 1963 – Prix Bourdelle

== Honours ==
- Chevalier des Arts et Lettres
- Salon des Artistes, Beaux arts Biennial – Gold medal
