= Lac de Saint-Agnan =

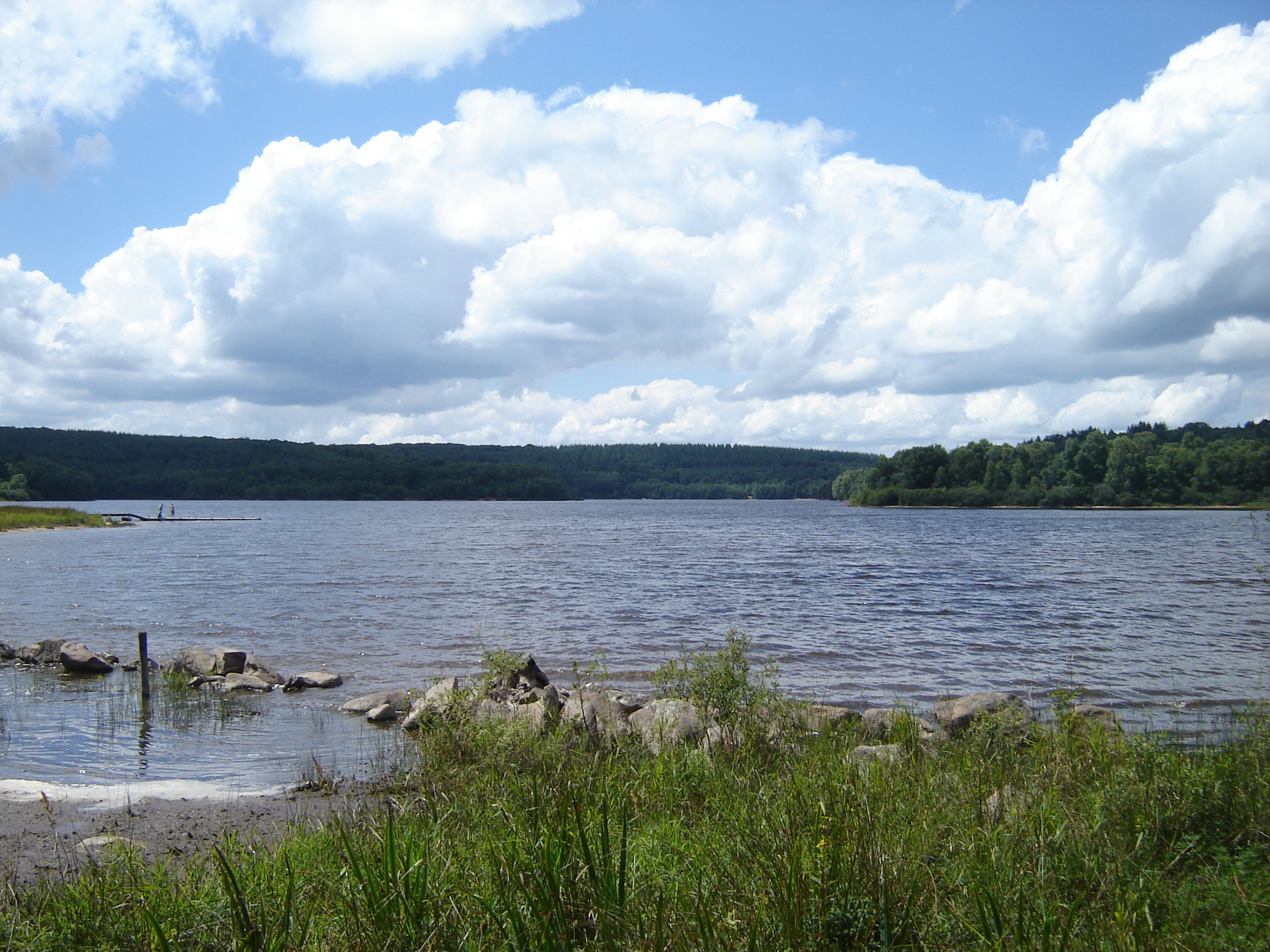

- Location within France
- Location: Nièvre
- Coordinates: 47°19′43″N 4°5′21″E
- Type: artificial
- Primary inflows: Cousin, Trinquelin
- Primary outflows: Cousin
- Basin countries: France
- Max. length: 2.5 km (1.6 mi)
- Max. width: 0.5 km (0.31 mi)
- Surface area: 1.4 km^{2} (0.54 sq mi)
- Surface elevation: 560 m (1,840 ft)

Lac de Saint-Agnan is a lake in Nièvre, France. At an elevation of 560 m, its surface area is 1.4 km^{2}.

== History ==
It was inaugurated in 1969. It is the last of the great lakes born from the Morvan dam. The lake was drained in October 2002 and 2008.
