= Accolay, Yonne =

Accolay
- Part of Deux Rivières
- Coat of arms
- Location of Accolay
- Location within France Location within Bourgogne-Franche-Comté
- Coordinates: 47°39′41″N 3°42′34″E
- Country: France
- Region: Bourgogne-Franche-Comté
- Department: Yonne
- Arrondissement: Auxerre
- Canton: Joux-la-Ville
- Commune: Deux Rivières
- Area^{1}: 9.27 km^{2} (3.58 sq mi)
- Highest elevation: 231 m (758 ft)
- Lowest elevation: 110 m (360 ft)
- Population (2021): 449
  - Density: 48.4/km^{2} (125/sq mi)
- Time zone: UTC+01:00 (CET)
  - Summer (DST): UTC+02:00 (CEST)
- Postal code: 89460
- ^{1} French Land Register data, which excludes lakes, ponds, glaciers > 1 km^{2} (0.386 sq mi or 247 acres) and river estuaries.

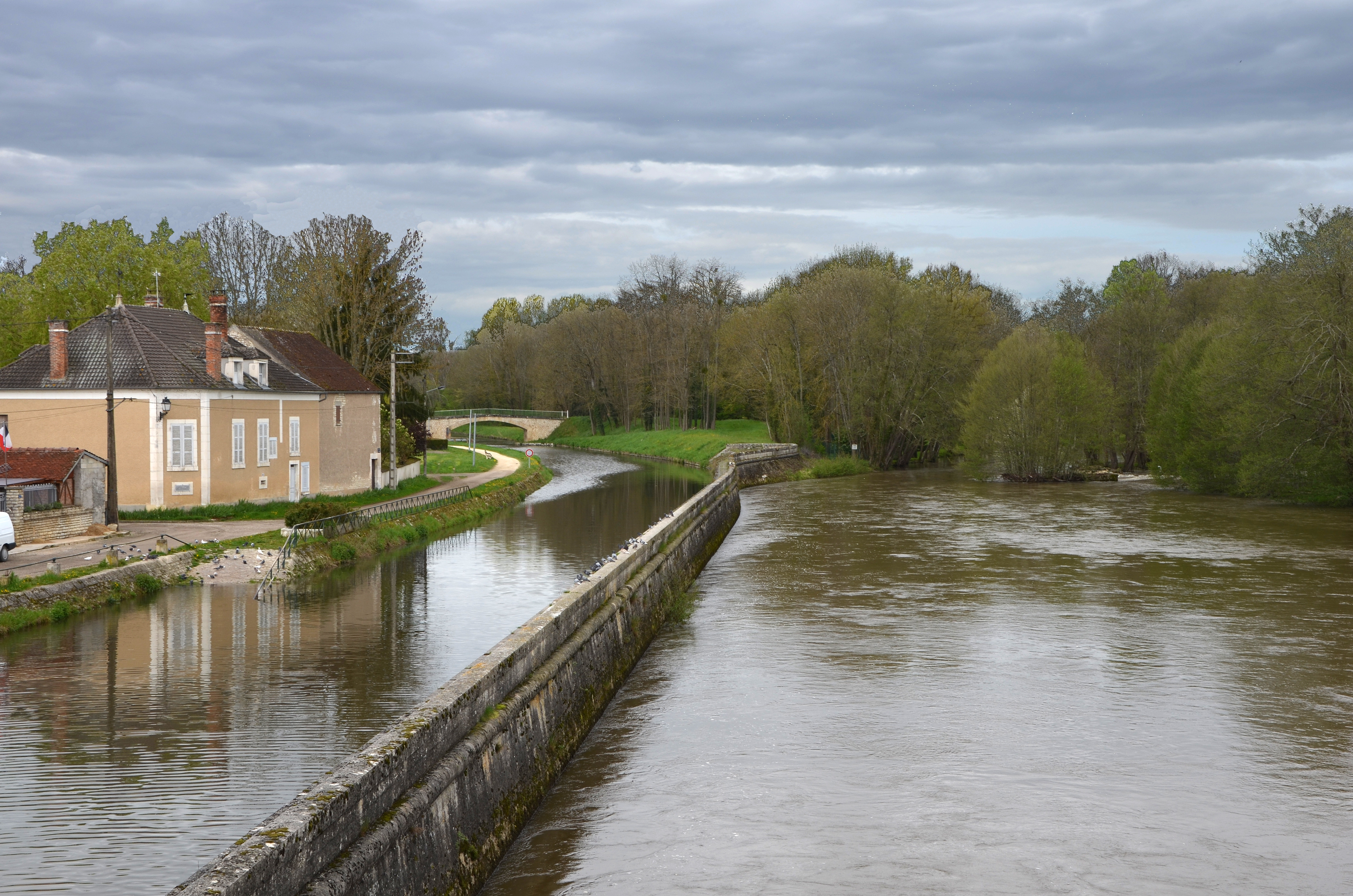
View from the Cure and the Accolay Canal in Accolay

Accolay (French pronunciation: [akɔlɛ]) is a former commune in the Yonne department in Bourgogne-Franche-Comté in north-central France. On 1 January 2017, it was merged with Cravant into the new commune of Deux Rivières.

The commune is bordered by the Cure River and the Nivernais Canal, just beside it. The canal junction was built in the 19th century to transport wood by timber rafting from the Morvan forests to Paris.

Accolay is one of the most ancient locations of the Yonne department, first mentioned in a document by the Bishop of Auxerre, Saint Aunaire, in the 6th century under the name Accolacus. The name is from the Gaulish patronym Accola with the suffix acus, which was applied to settlements along Roman villaes.

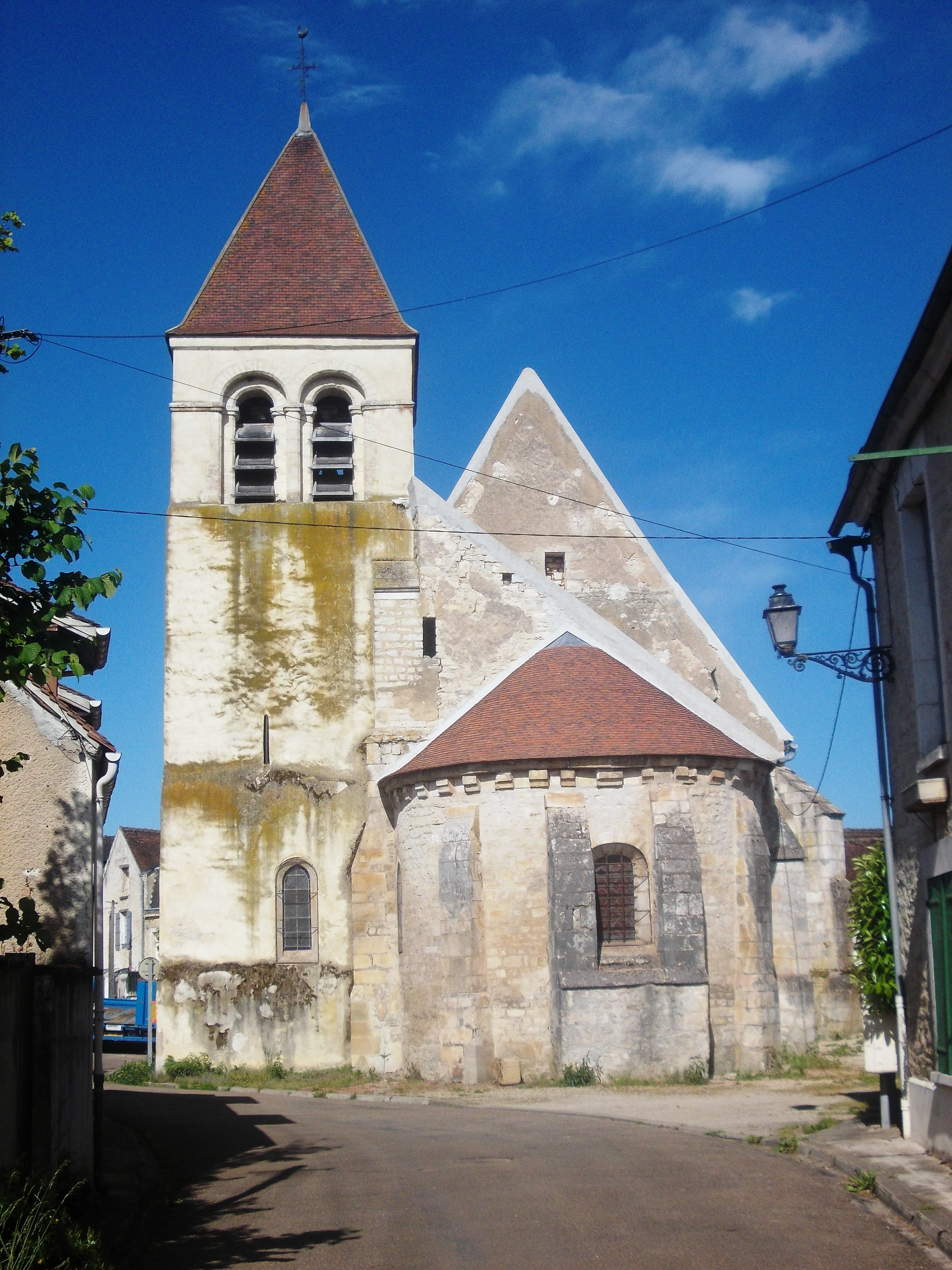
saint-Nizier church in Accolay

The Saint-Nizier church has a chancel and a Romanesque apsel separated by a classic nave. The first church on this site was built in the 11th century, and the present building dates from the 18th century. The church possesses three statues dating from 1695, classified as national monuments.

The village was noted as a producer of pottery and ceramics that became renowned between 1945 and 1983.

The commune boasts, amongst others, a library, an elementary school, a children's nursery, a recreation centre, a municipal camping ground and a post office.

== Population ==
Historical population
Year	Pop.	±% p.a.
2006	462	—
2011	423	−1.75%
2021	449	+0.60%
Source: INSEE

== See also ==
- Communes of the Yonne department

== External references ==
- Official Site of the commune (in French)
- Official Site of Accolay's Potters
- Website of the area tourist office
