= Dun-les-Places =

- Commune
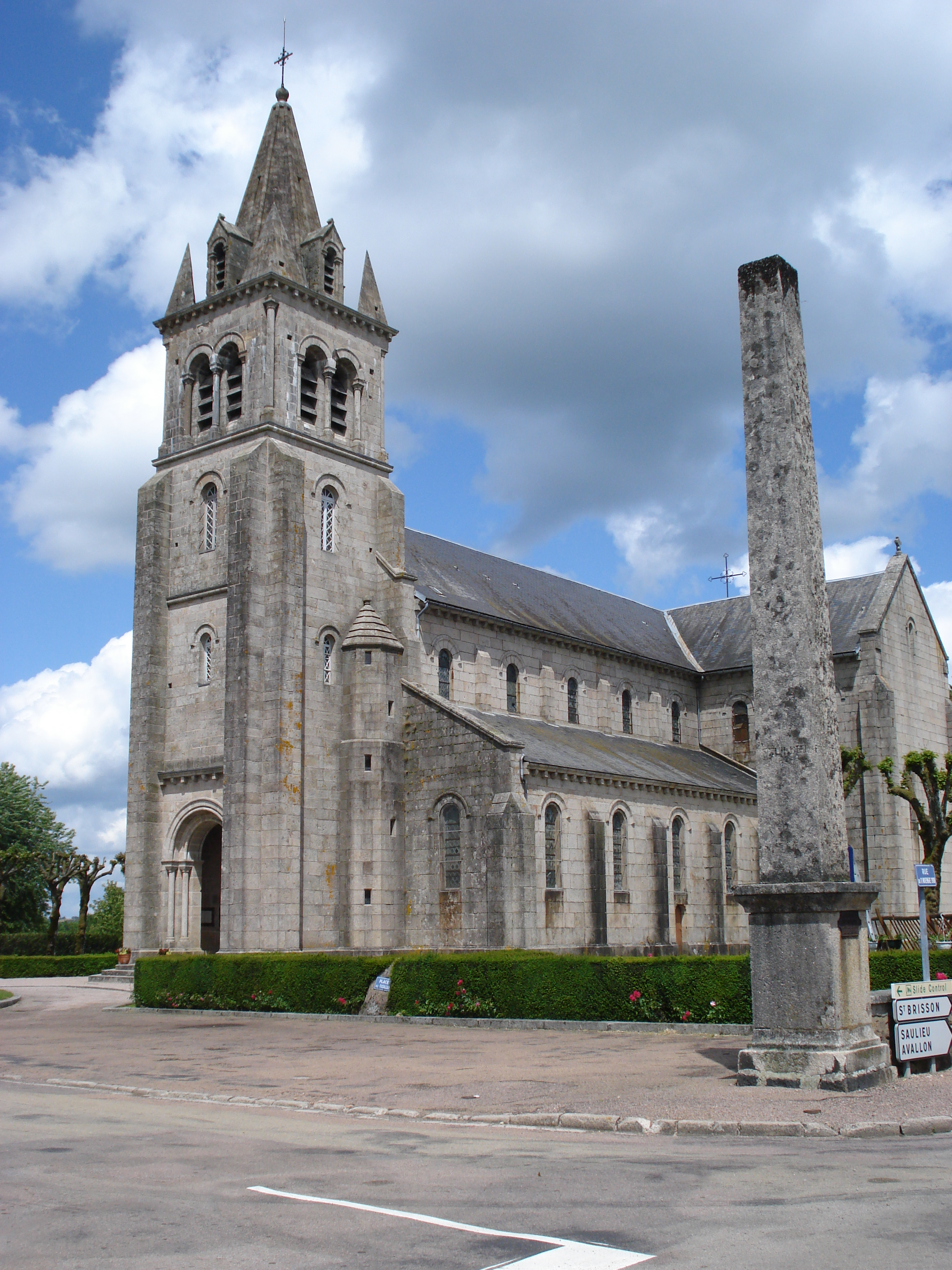
- The church in Dun-les-Places
- Location of Dun-les-Places
- Location within France Location within Bourgogne-Franche-Comté
- Coordinates: 47°17′11″N 4°01′00″E
- Country: France
- Region: Bourgogne-Franche-Comté
- Department: Nièvre
- Arrondissement: Château-Chinon (Ville)
- Canton: Corbigny
- Intercommunality: CC Morvan Sommets et Grands Lacs

Government
  - Mayor (2022–2026): Daniel Gonthier
- Area^{1}: 45.10 km^{2} (17.41 sq mi)
- Highest elevation: 651 m (2,136 ft)
- Lowest elevation: 365 m (1,198 ft)
- Population (2023): 358
  - Density: 7.94/km^{2} (20.6/sq mi)
- Demonym: Dunois
- Time zone: UTC+01:00 (CET)
  - Summer (DST): UTC+02:00 (CEST)
- INSEE/Postal code: 58106 /58230
- Website: www.dun-les-places.fr
- ^{1} French Land Register data, which excludes lakes, ponds, glaciers > 1 km^{2} (0.386 sq mi or 247 acres) and river estuaries.

Dun-les-Places (French pronunciation: [dœ̃ le plas]) is a commune in the Nièvre department in central France. It is within Morvan Regional Natural Park, on the departmental border with Yonne.

The village is historically significant as one of the "martyred villages" of the Liberation in 1944; the occupying forces killed 27 inhabitants before their retreat to Germany, making it the worst World War II massacre in Burgundy.

== In World War II ==
During World War II, British Special Air Service (SAS) units and French Resistance (Maquis) groups operated in the region, conducting sabotage and harassment of the occupying German forces. These activities intensified in June 1944 as part of efforts to disrupt German movements ahead of the Allied liberation.

=== Dun-les-Places massacre ===
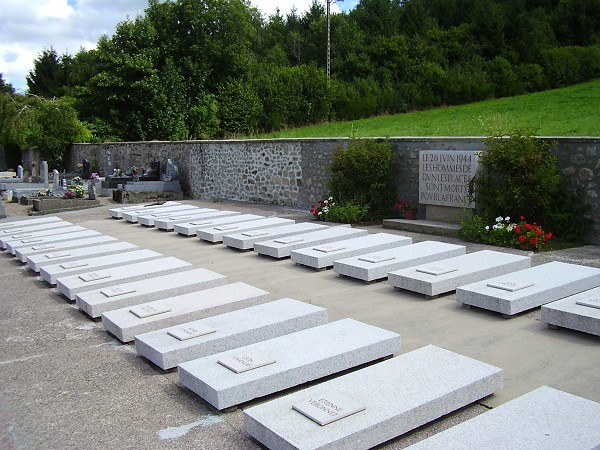
Graves of the massacred of 1944

On 24 June 1944, the Germans destroyed the nearby villages of Montsauche and Planchez. Two days later, on the evening of 26 June, a group of Gestapo and militia arrived in Dun-les-Places. They arrested 18 men from the village, including the local priest, under the pretext of a "document check". The men were interrogated at a nearby hotel about the presence of Maquis but provided no information despite the Resistance's known activities in the area. Meanwhile, the women and children were terrorised in their homes.

Around 10 pm, during a storm and an electricity blackout, gunfire echoed through the village. The Germans vandalised homes, looted wine, food, and valuables, and slaughtered livestock, including pigs, sheep, and poultry. The following day, 27 June, systematic looting continued, with the invaders taking linen, bedding, and other possessions. By early 28 June, the Germans began their departure by setting fire to homes using flamethrowers, grenades, and incendiary logs.

After the Germans left, villagers discovered the bodies of the hostages. Most lay on the church porch, while the priest's body was found in the church tower. He had reportedly been hung from the belfry and later cut down. Other victims were found on nearby roads or in neighboring villages. In total, 27 people were killed in the massacre. Their funeral was held on 1 July 1944.

Around this time, a small group of Maquisards and SAS soldiers passed through the village twice without encountering German forces, though this account is disputed. According to the book Danger Has No Face by James Hutchison, the Chevrière Maquis and SAS engaged in a fierce firefight with the Germans between Dun-les-Places and Vermot in the Bois du Chevrière, as part of "Mission Verveine".

During the same period, a makeshift Maquis hospital at a local château was attacked and burned by German forces. Despite the assault, both Maquis and SAS forces inflicted over 30 casualties on the Germans while safely evacuating all wounded personnel to a more secure location in the heavily wooded area southwest of the village.

== See also ==
- Communes of the Nièvre department
- Morvan Regional Natural Park
