= Chastellux-sur-Cure =

- Commune
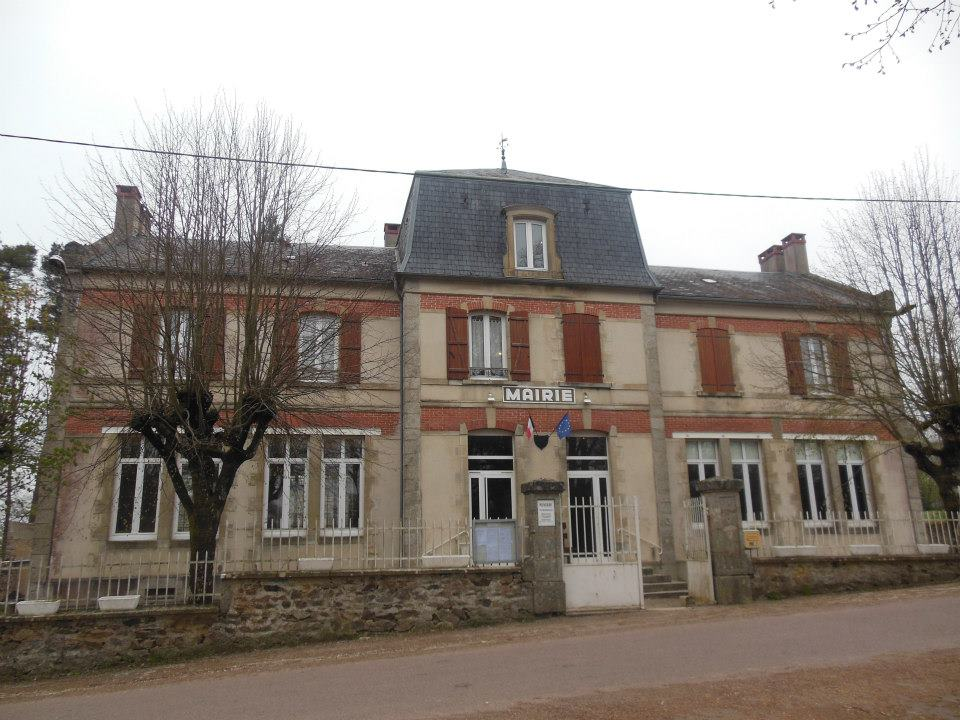
- The town hall in Chastellux-sur-Cure
- Location of Chastellux-sur-Cure
- Location within France Location within Bourgogne-Franche-Comté
- Coordinates: 47°23′13″N 3°53′18″E
- Country: France
- Region: Bourgogne-Franche-Comté
- Department: Yonne
- Arrondissement: Avallon
- Canton: Avallon

Government
  - Mayor (2020–2026): Gérard Paillard
- Area^{1}: 10.55 km^{2} (4.07 sq mi)
- Highest elevation: 397 m (1,302 ft)
- Lowest elevation: 210 m (690 ft)
- Population (2023): 129
  - Density: 12.2/km^{2} (31.7/sq mi)
- Time zone: UTC+01:00 (CET)
  - Summer (DST): UTC+02:00 (CEST)
- INSEE/Postal code: 89089 /89630
- ^{1} French Land Register data, which excludes lakes, ponds, glaciers > 1 km^{2} (0.386 sq mi or 247 acres) and river estuaries.

Chastellux-sur-Cure (French pronunciation: [ʃatly syʁ kyʁ], literally Chastellux on Cure) is a commune in the Yonne department in Bourgogne-Franche-Comté in north-central France.

The Chateau de Chastellux, the ancestral home of the Chastellux family, is visitable every day after 10 am except Monday and Tuesday ( tel: 06-76-75-83-71 or 08-86-34-20-03 ). It is still owned by descendants of Marquis de Chastellux who was second in command ( 1780 to 1782) to the Comte de Rochambeau who led the French military contingent during the American War of Independence.

== See also ==
- Communes of the Yonne department
- Parc naturel régional du Morvan
