= Deux Rivières =

- Commune
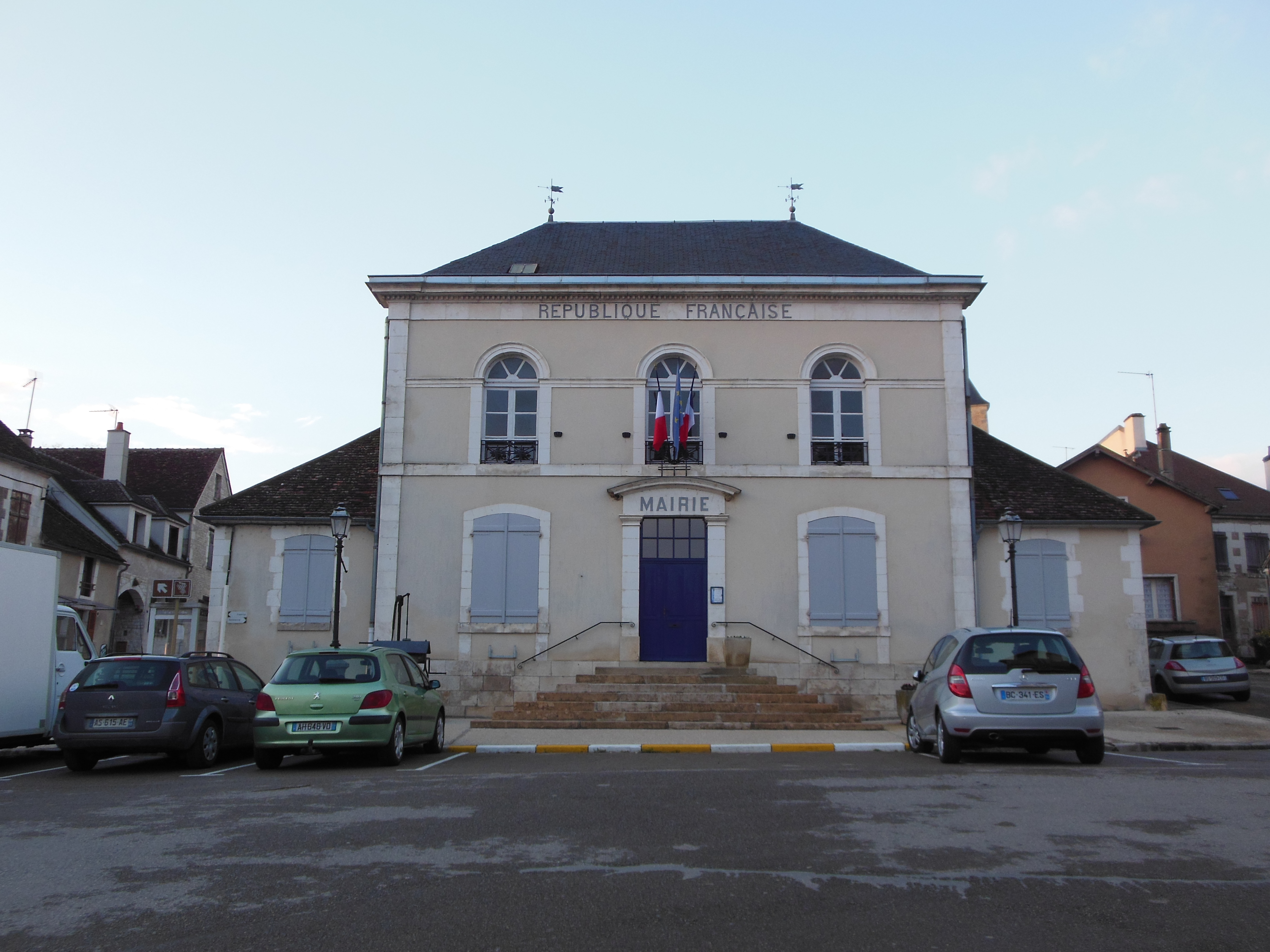
- The town hall in Cravant
- Location of Deux Rivières
- Location within France Location within Bourgogne-Franche-Comté
- Coordinates: 47°41′02″N 3°41′31″E
- Country: France
- Region: Bourgogne-Franche-Comté
- Department: Yonne
- Arrondissement: Auxerre
- Canton: Joux-la-Ville
- Intercommunality: Chablis Villages et Terroirs

Government
  - Mayor (2020–2026): Alain Loury
- Area^{1}: 31.81 km^{2} (12.28 sq mi)
- Population (2023): 1,245
  - Density: 39.14/km^{2} (101.4/sq mi)
- Time zone: UTC+01:00 (CET)
  - Summer (DST): UTC+02:00 (CEST)
- INSEE/Postal code: 89130 /89460
- ^{1} French Land Register data, which excludes lakes, ponds, glaciers > 1 km^{2} (0.386 sq mi or 247 acres) and river estuaries.

Deux Rivières (French pronunciation: [dø ʁivjɛʁ], literally Two Rivers) is a commune in the department of Yonne, central France. The municipality was established on 1 January 2017 by merger of the former communes of Cravant (the seat) and Accolay.

== See also ==
- Communes of the Yonne department
