= Voutenay-sur-Cure =

- Commune
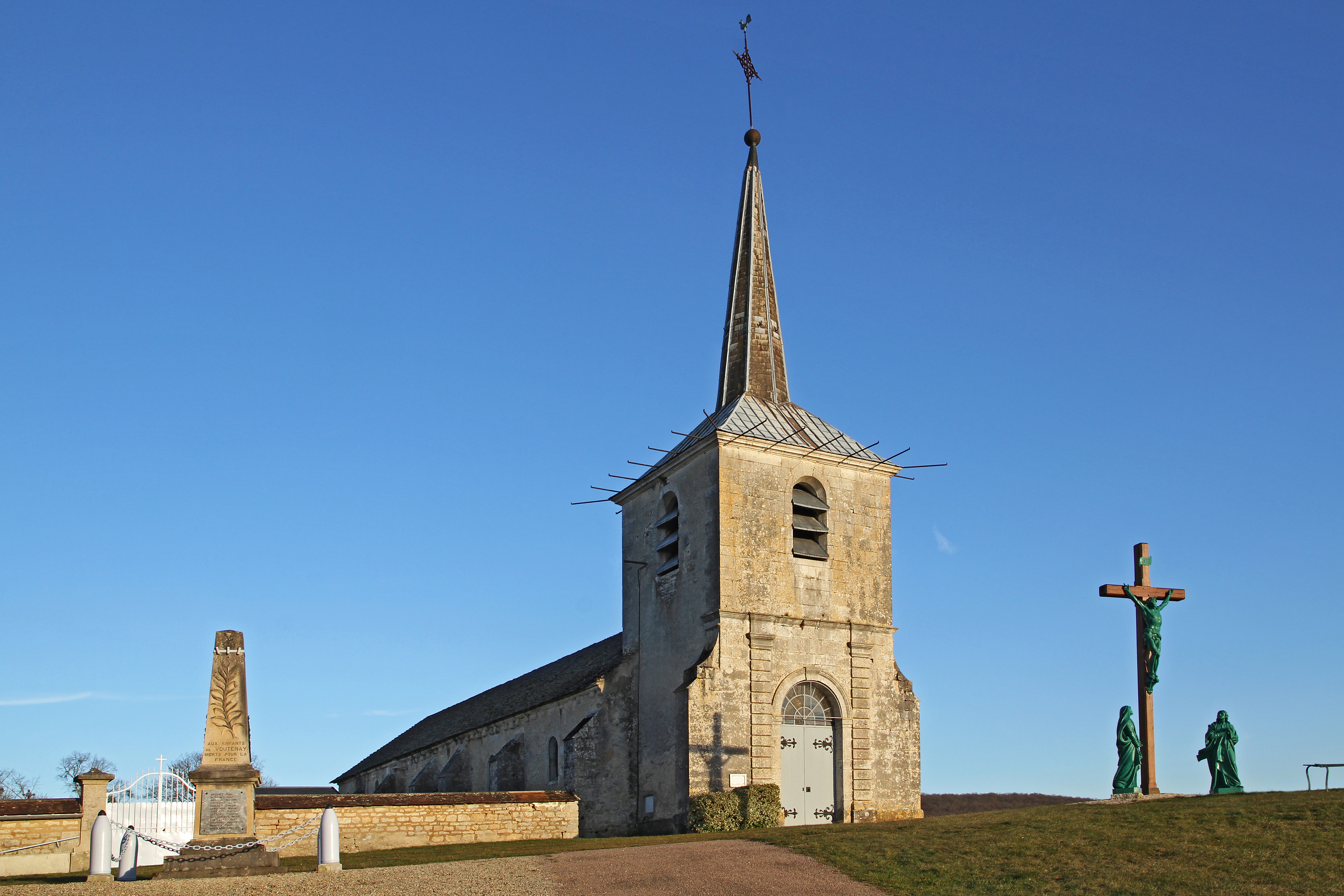
- The church in Voutenay-sur-Cure
- Location of Voutenay-sur-Cure
- Location within France Location within Bourgogne-Franche-Comté
- Coordinates: 47°33′46″N 3°47′08″E
- Country: France
- Region: Bourgogne-Franche-Comté
- Department: Yonne
- Arrondissement: Avallon
- Canton: Joux-la-Ville
- Intercommunality: Avallon-Vézelay-Morvan

Government
  - Mayor (2020–2026): Didier Swiatkowski
- Area^{1}: 10.04 km^{2} (3.88 sq mi)
- Highest elevation: 268 m (879 ft)
- Lowest elevation: 127 m (417 ft)
- Population (2023): 212
  - Density: 21.1/km^{2} (54.7/sq mi)
- Time zone: UTC+01:00 (CET)
  - Summer (DST): UTC+02:00 (CEST)
- INSEE/Postal code: 89485 /89270
- ^{1} French Land Register data, which excludes lakes, ponds, glaciers > 1 km^{2} (0.386 sq mi or 247 acres) and river estuaries.

Voutenay-sur-Cure (French pronunciation: [vutnɛ syʁ kyʁ], literally Voutenay on Cure) is a commune in the Yonne department in Bourgogne-Franche-Comté in north-central France.

== See also ==
- Communes of the Yonne department
