= Lac des Settons =

Lake in Nièvre, France

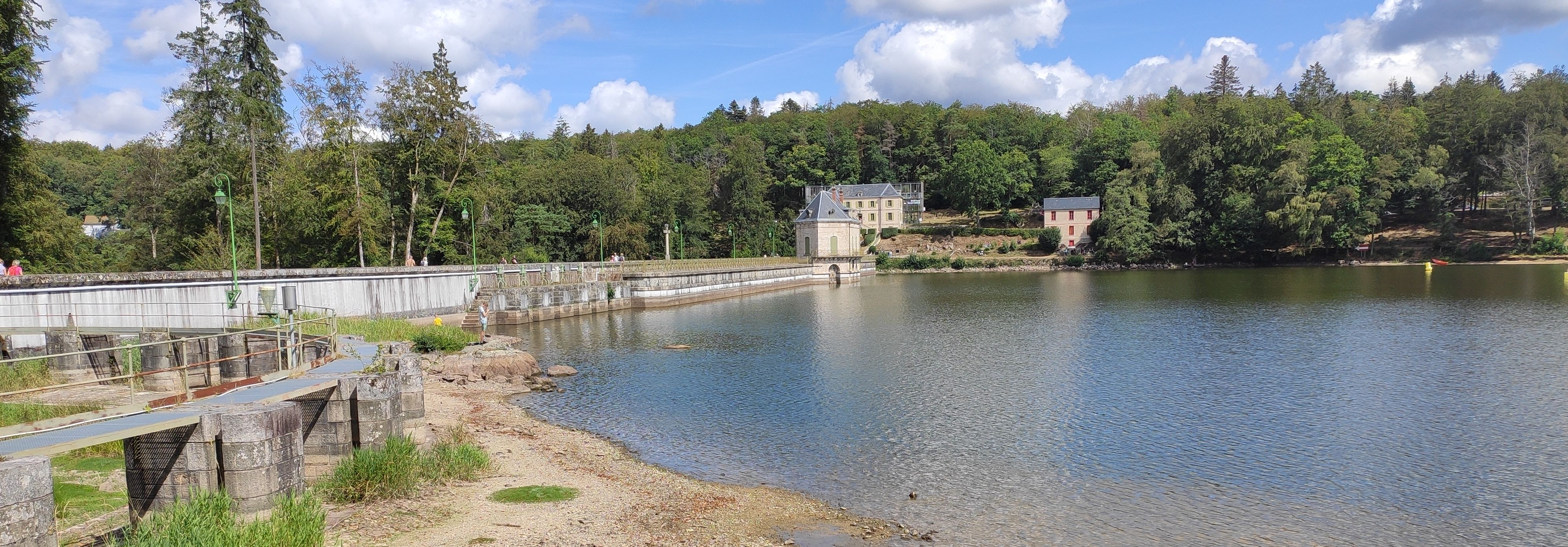
- A view of the Barrage des Settons

- Location within France
- Location: Nièvre
- Coordinates: 47°10′52″N 4°3′50″E
- Type: Artificial
- Primary inflows: Cure, Lyonnet, Piscuit
- Primary outflows: Cure
- Basin countries: France
- Max. length: 3.5 km (2.2 mi)
- Max. width: 2 km (1.2 mi)
- Surface area: 3.67 km^{2} (1.42 sq mi)
- Max. depth: 20 m (66 ft)
- Water volume: 19,500,000 m^{3} (690,000,000 cu ft)
- Surface elevation: 586 m (1,923 ft)
- Islands: 2

The Lac des Settons (Lake of the Settons) is a reservoir in the Nièvre department, France, with a surface area of 3.67 km^{2} (1.42 sq mi). Supplied mainly by the River Cure, it is situated in the heart of Morvan Regional Natural Park. The lake is found south of the town Montsauche-les-Settons. It is one of the Great Lakes of the Morvan.

== General overview ==
The reservoir, whose perimeter exceeds 13 km (8.1 mi), has an average depth of 6 m (20 ft) and is situated at an altitude of 586 m (1,923 ft). It was formed between 1854 and 1861 by a 20-metre (66 ft) high granite dam. The reservoir was intended to regulate traffic on the Yonne River and help allow timber rafting to Paris.

== History ==
=== Construction ===
The first surveys date back to the time of Louis XVI, but these were never completed. They were restarted under the command of André Dupin. On 15 July 1854, the work was contracted to Perrichon, an entrepreneur from Nevers. Meanwhile, the execution of the work was carried out by Cambuzat, Lepeuple and Otry of Labrit. The construction of the dam was started in 1854 and finished in 1858. The dam was constructed from granite rocks, hauled by cattle from the Breuil-Chenue forest, which was 15 mi (24 km) away from the lake. To get the granite, they pushed north to the heights of the Ponceaux, and south to those of the Outre-Cure. The dam was dedicated on 13 May 1858 by the future Bishop of Troyes, Pierre-Louis-Marie Cortet.

Several buildings were submerged, notably windmills that can still be seen every decade or so, when the reservoir is emptied. In 1861, the new construction was required to repair water damage. Around 1920, the lake lost its main function since timber was no longer rafted to Paris due to wood's replacement by coal as a fuel source. The lake was then abandoned for several decades.

=== Later years ===
The dam became a listed site in 1937. The lake then became popular leisure destination. In 1956 the first camping site opened for business, while the hotels increased in number.
