= Haut-Folin =

Mountain in France

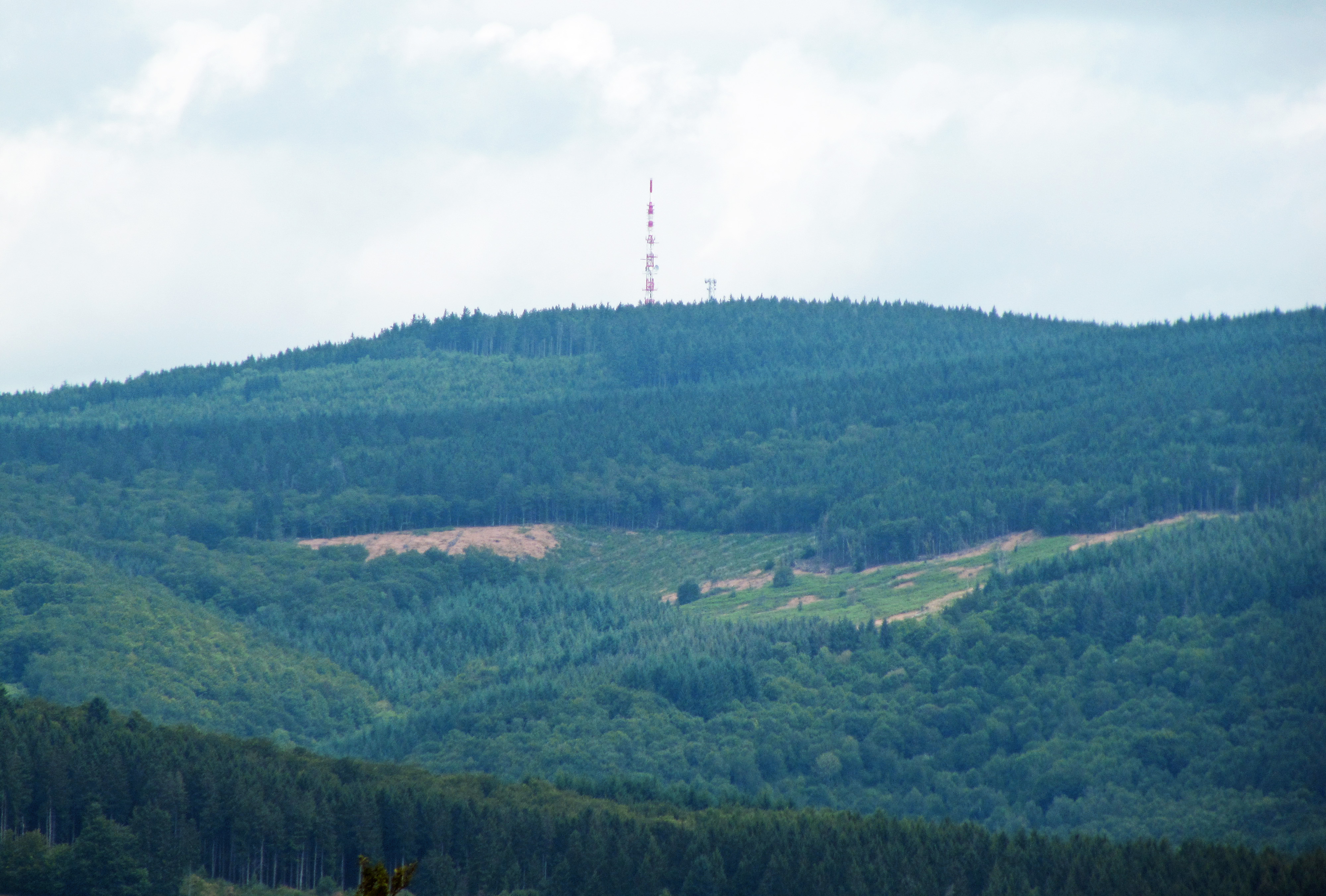

Highest point
- Elevation: 901 m (2,956 ft)
- Coordinates: 46°59′45″N 4°2′14″E

Geography
- Location within France
- Location: Saône-et-Loire, France
- Parent range: Morvan

Haut-Folin (French pronunciation: [o fɔlɛ̃]) in the Saône-et-Loire department is at 901 m the highest point in the region of Burgundy in France. It is the summit of the Morvan mountain range. It forms part of the drainage divide between the Seine and Loire rivers. It is located in the commune of Saint-Prix. There is a 40 km of cross-country skiing ski resort. The mountain is 901 m.

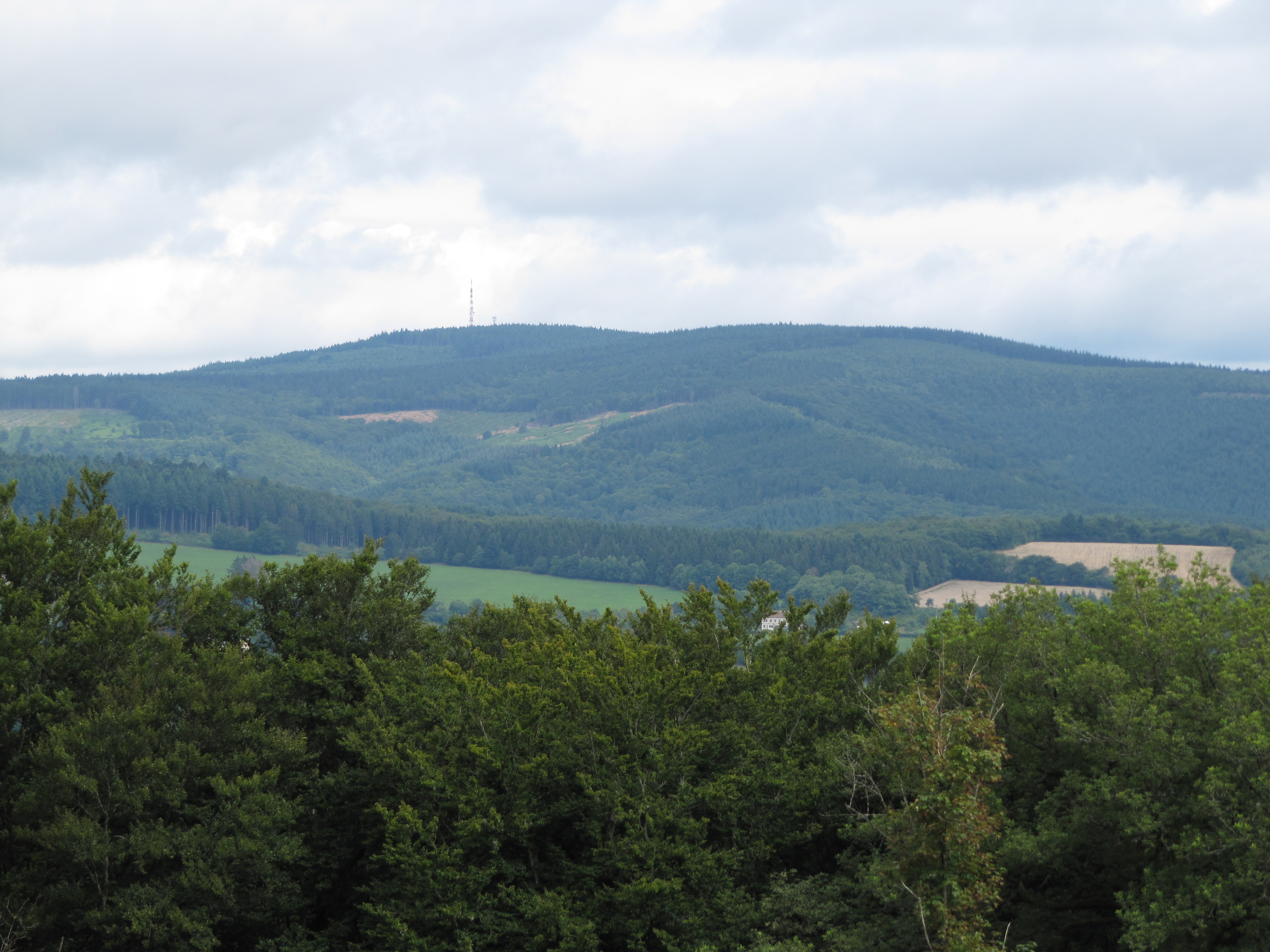
Haut folin view from Mont Beuvray

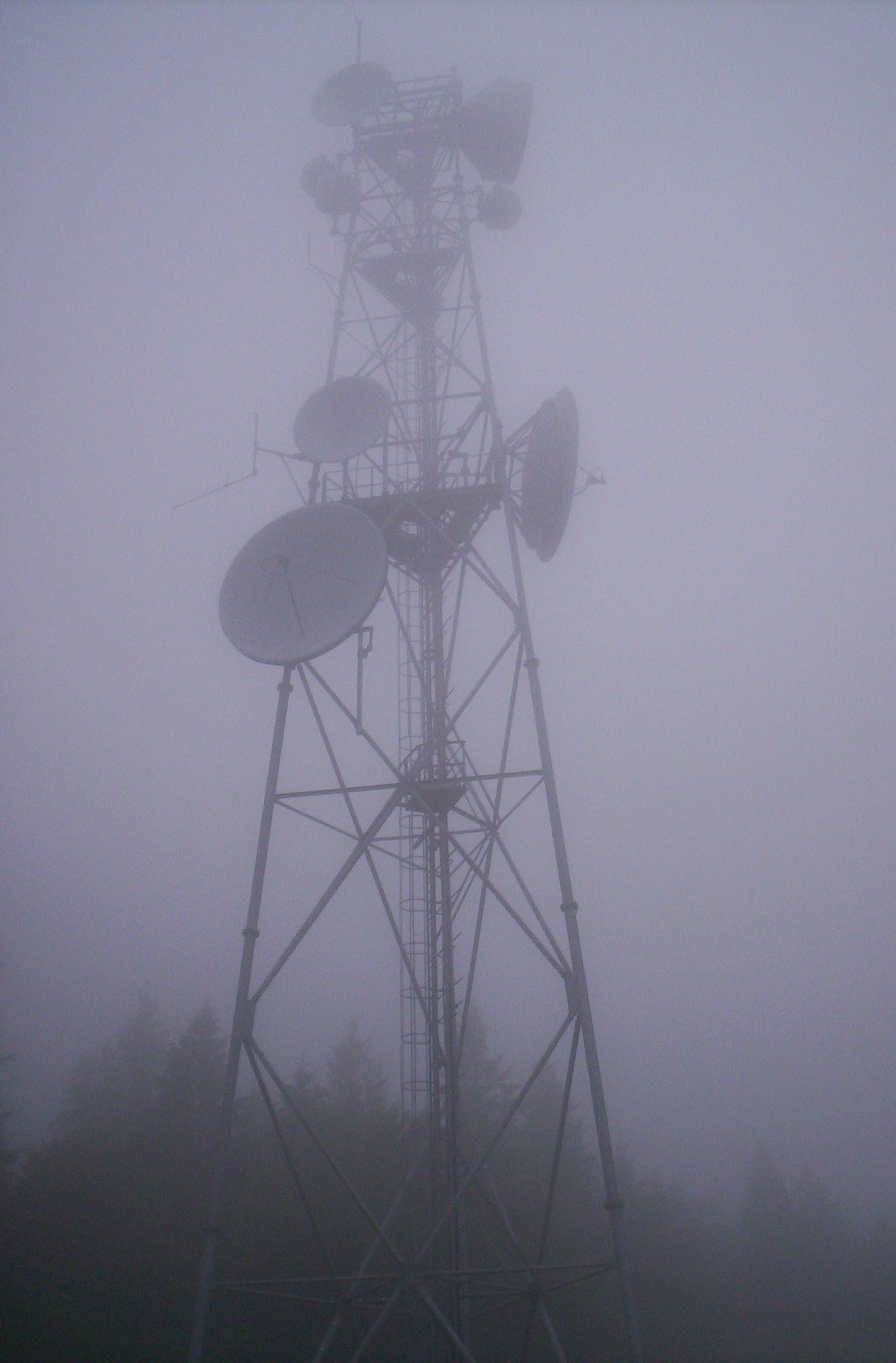
Television relay station
