= Battle of Cravant =

1423 battle of the Hundred Years' War

Coordinates: 47.6839°N 3.6917°E

- Part of the Hundred Years' War
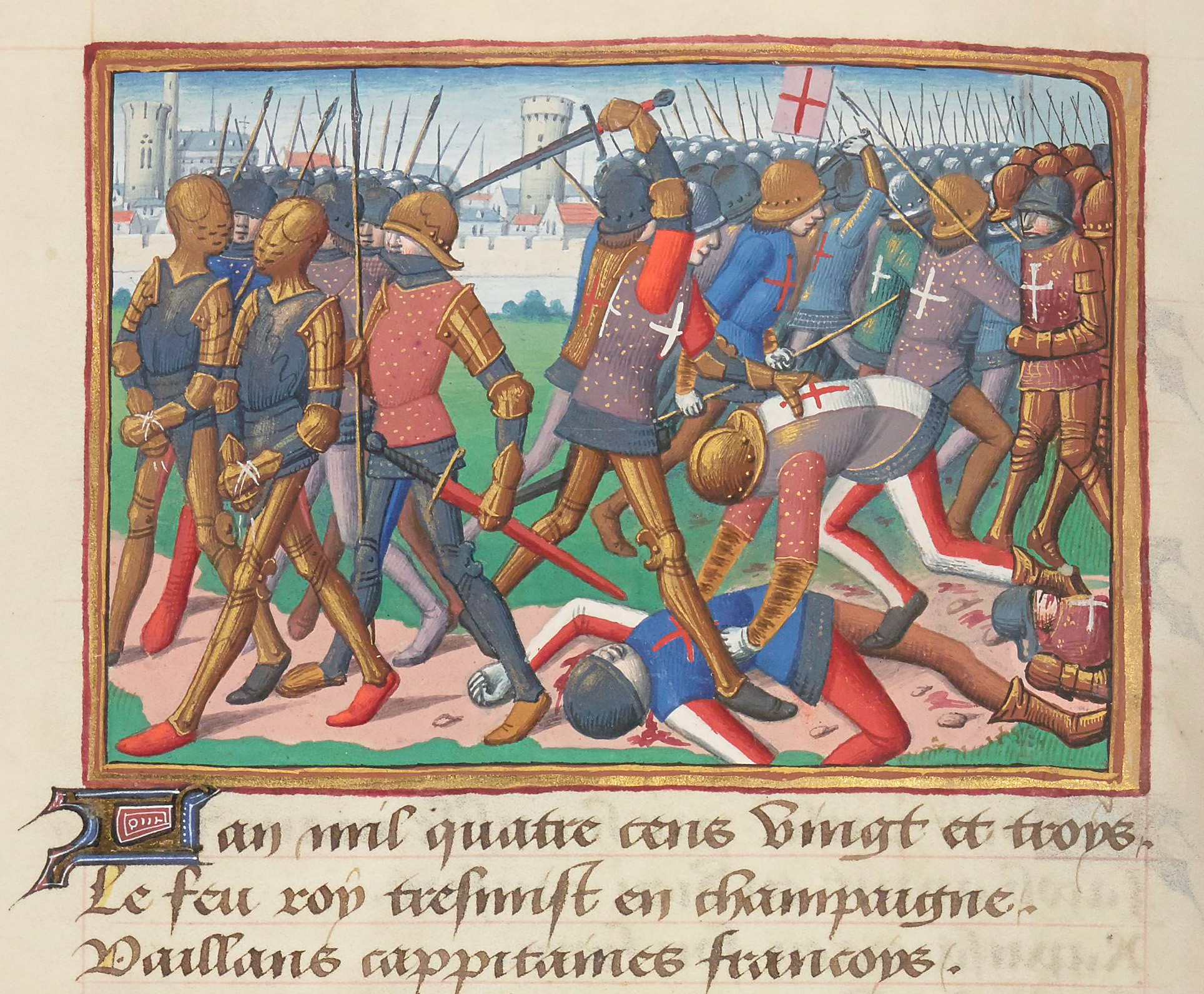
Date	31 July 1423
Location	Near Cravant, Burgundy
Result	Anglo-Burgundian victory

Belligerents
Kingdom of England; Burgundian State	Kingdom of France; Kingdom of Scotland

Commanders and leaders
Earl of Salisbury; Robert Willoughby	John Stewart, Earl of Buchan (POW); Louis, Count of Vendôme (POW)

Strength
4,000 • 2,000 English • 2,000 Burgundians	8,000 • 4,000 French • 4,000 Scots

Casualties and losses
Unknown	3,200–5,000 1,200–3,000 killed 2,000 captured

The Battle of Cravant was fought on 31 July 1423, during the Hundred Years' War between English and French forces at the village of Cravant in Burgundy, at a bridge and ford on the banks of the river Yonne, a left-bank tributary of the Seine, southeast of Auxerre. The battle ended in a victory for the English and their Burgundian allies.

== Background ==
After the Treaty of Troyes in 1420, the English king was permitted to occupy all the country north of the Loire. In 1422, with Henry V suddenly dead and an infant King Henry VI of England assuming the throne, hostilities resumed.

In the early summer of 1423, the French Dauphin Charles assembled an army at Bourges intending to invade Burgundian territory. This French army contained a large number of Scots under John Stewart, Earl of Buchan, who was commanding the entire mixed force, as well as Spanish and Lombard mercenaries. This army besieged the town of Cravant. The garrison of Cravant requested help from the Dowager Duchess of Burgundy, who raised troops and in turn sought support from Burgundy's English allies, which was forthcoming. The two allied armies, one English, one Burgundian, rendezvoused at Auxerre on 29 July.

== Allied preparations ==
The allied commanders held a council of war in Auxerre Cathedral on the evening of 29 July. This led to the drafting of an order of battle, covering a mixture of tactical and disciplinary matters. The army was clearly intending to fight a dismounted action, with horses taken to the rear, and archers were to prepare anti-cavalry stakes. That night the army was ordered to pray for victory. The march was to begin at 10 o'clock the following morning.

== Armies ==
=== Allies ===
The combined English and Burgundian forces were led by Jean de Toulongeon, Thomas Montacute, 4th Earl of Salisbury, with Lord Willoughby as second in command. The Anglo-Burgundian army mustered about 4,000 men (2,000 Burgundians and 2,000 English), including 1,500 men-at-arms (500 English and 1,000 Burgundian), 1,500 English archers, some Burgundian crossbowmen and pioneers and 40 veuglaires (light artillery), manned by the citizens of Auxerre.

=== French ===
The French army was commanded by Sir John Stewart of Darnley with Louis, Count of Vendôme, as second in command. There were about 4,000 Scots. A sizeable French force was present with smaller forces of Aragonese and Lombard mercenaries. The Dauphinist army was larger than the Anglo-Burgundian force perhaps by two to three times.

== Battle ==
The allied army marched throughout 30 July and that evening, 6 kilometres (4 mi) short of Cravant, sighted the enemy. The following day, having assessed the enemy position as too strong, they crossed the river Yonne and attempted to reach Cravant by another route. Approaching the town from across the river, the allies saw that the French army had changed position and was now waiting for them on the other bank. For three hours the forces watched each other, neither willing to attempt an opposed river crossing. Eventually, the Scots archers began shooting into the allied ranks. The allied artillery replied, supported by their own archers and crossbowmen.

Seeing the Dauphinists were suffering casualties and becoming disordered, Salisbury took the initiative and his army began to cross the waist-high river, some 50 metres wide, under a covering barrage of arrows from the English archers. Meanwhile, another force under Willoughby attacked the Scots across the narrow bridge and divided the Dauphin's army. The French began to withdraw, but the Scots refused to flee and fought on, to be cut down by the hundreds. Perhaps 1,200–3,000 of them fell at the bridgehead or along the riverbanks, and over 2,000 prisoners were taken, including Darnley (who also lost an eye) and the Comte de Vendôme. While the Anglo-Burgundians were fighting, the Burgundian knights in Cravant came out from the fortress following the lord of Chastellux and launched a devastating cavalry charge against the Dauphinist forces which completely broke their lines. Being crushed from two sides the Dauphinist army fled the battlefield.

The Dauphin's forces retreated to the Loire. On 2 August, the English and Burgundian armies withdrew separately from Cravant, the Burgundians marching to Dijon, the English to Montaiguillon.

== Aftermath ==
The success at Cravant was the first for a joint English and Burgundian army. Despite this success, the allies would rarely fight together again, usually operating separately from one another. The Dauphinists would suffer an even greater defeat the following year at the Battle of Verneuil.

== Sources ==
- Burne, A.H. (1991) [1956]. The Agincourt War. London: Greenhill Books. p. 81. ISBN 1853670871.
- Grummitt, David (2015). Henry VI. Routledge.
- Myers, A.R., ed. (1996). English Historical Documents: Volume 4 1327–1485. London: Routledge. ISBN 978-0415143691.
- Smith, Robert; Kelly DeVries (2005). The Artillery of the Dukes of Burgundy 1363–1477. Woodbridge, Suffolk: Boydell & Brewer. pp. 150–151. ISBN 1843831627.
- Wagner, John A. (2006). Encyclopedia of the Hundred Years War. Greenwood Publishing Group. ISBN 978-0313327360.
