= Lac du Crescent =

Reservoir in France

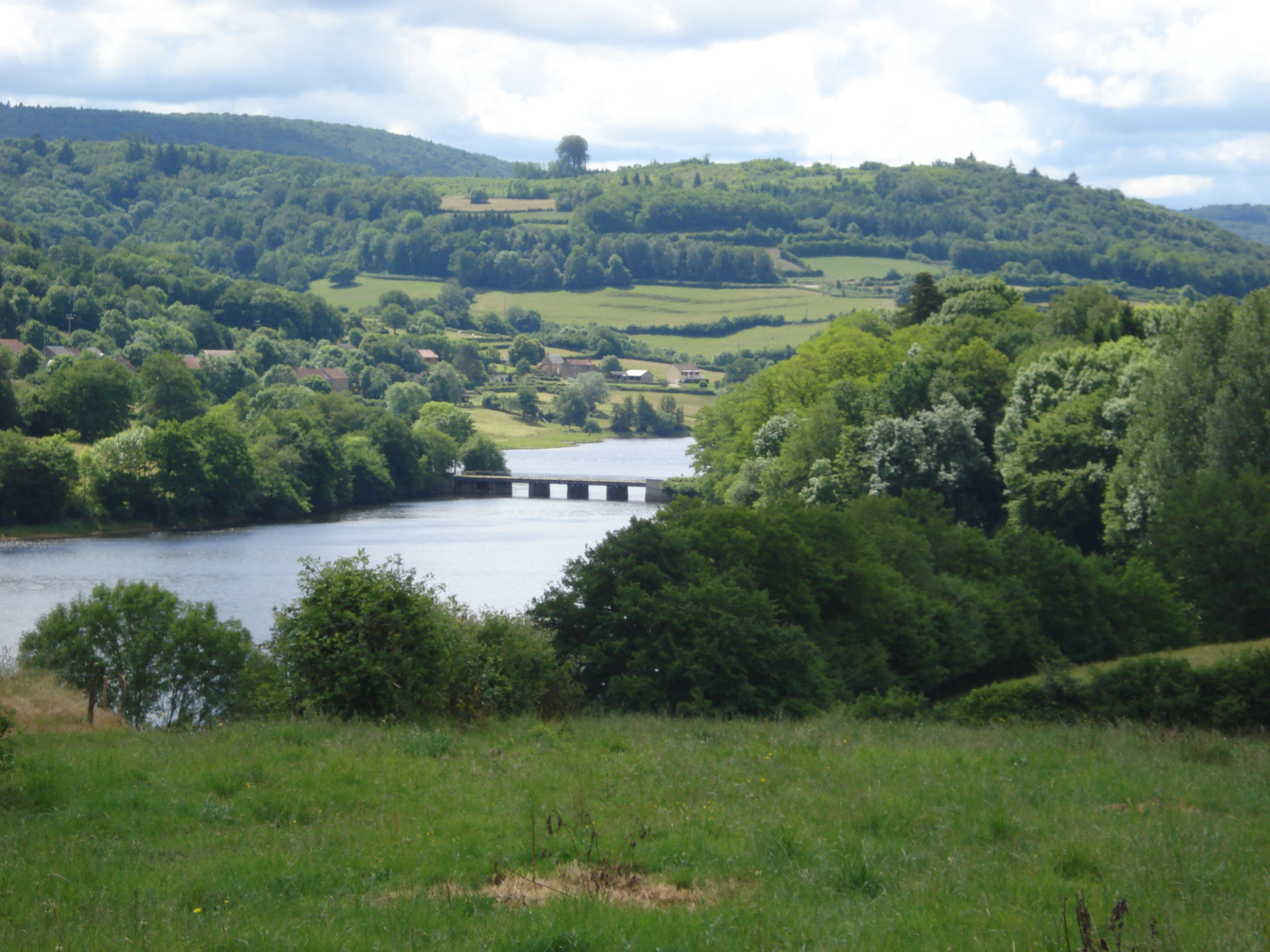

- Location within France
- Location: Nièvre
- Coordinates: 47°22′24″N 3°54′37″E
- Type: artificial
- Primary inflows: Cure, Chalaux, Crescent
- Primary outflows: Cure
- Basin countries: France
- Surface area: 1.65 km^{2} (0.64 sq mi)
- Water volume: 14,250,000 m^{3} (503,000,000 cu ft)
- Surface elevation: 300 m (980 ft)

Lac du Crescent is a lake in Nièvre, France. At an elevation of 300 m, its surface area is 1.65 km².
