= Bessy-sur-Cure =

- Commune
- Location of Bessy-sur-Cure
- Location within France Location within Bourgogne-Franche-Comté
- Coordinates: 47°37′18″N 3°44′29″E
- Country: France
- Region: Bourgogne-Franche-Comté
- Department: Yonne
- Arrondissement: Auxerre
- Canton: Joux-la-Ville

Government
  - Mayor (2020–2026): Aurélie Lanio
- Area^{1}: 10.53 km^{2} (4.07 sq mi)
- Highest elevation: 233 m (764 ft)
- Lowest elevation: 117 m (384 ft)
- Population (2023): 184
  - Density: 17.5/km^{2} (45.3/sq mi)
- Time zone: UTC+01:00 (CET)
  - Summer (DST): UTC+02:00 (CEST)
- INSEE/Postal code: 89040 /89270
- ^{1} French Land Register data, which excludes lakes, ponds, glaciers > 1 km^{2} (0.386 sq mi or 247 acres) and river estuaries.

Bessy-sur-Cure (French pronunciation: [bɛsi syʁ kyʁ], literally Bessy on Cure) is a commune in the Yonne department in Bourgogne-Franche-Comté in north-central France.

== See also ==
- Communes of the Yonne department
