= Montsauche-les-Settons =

- Commune
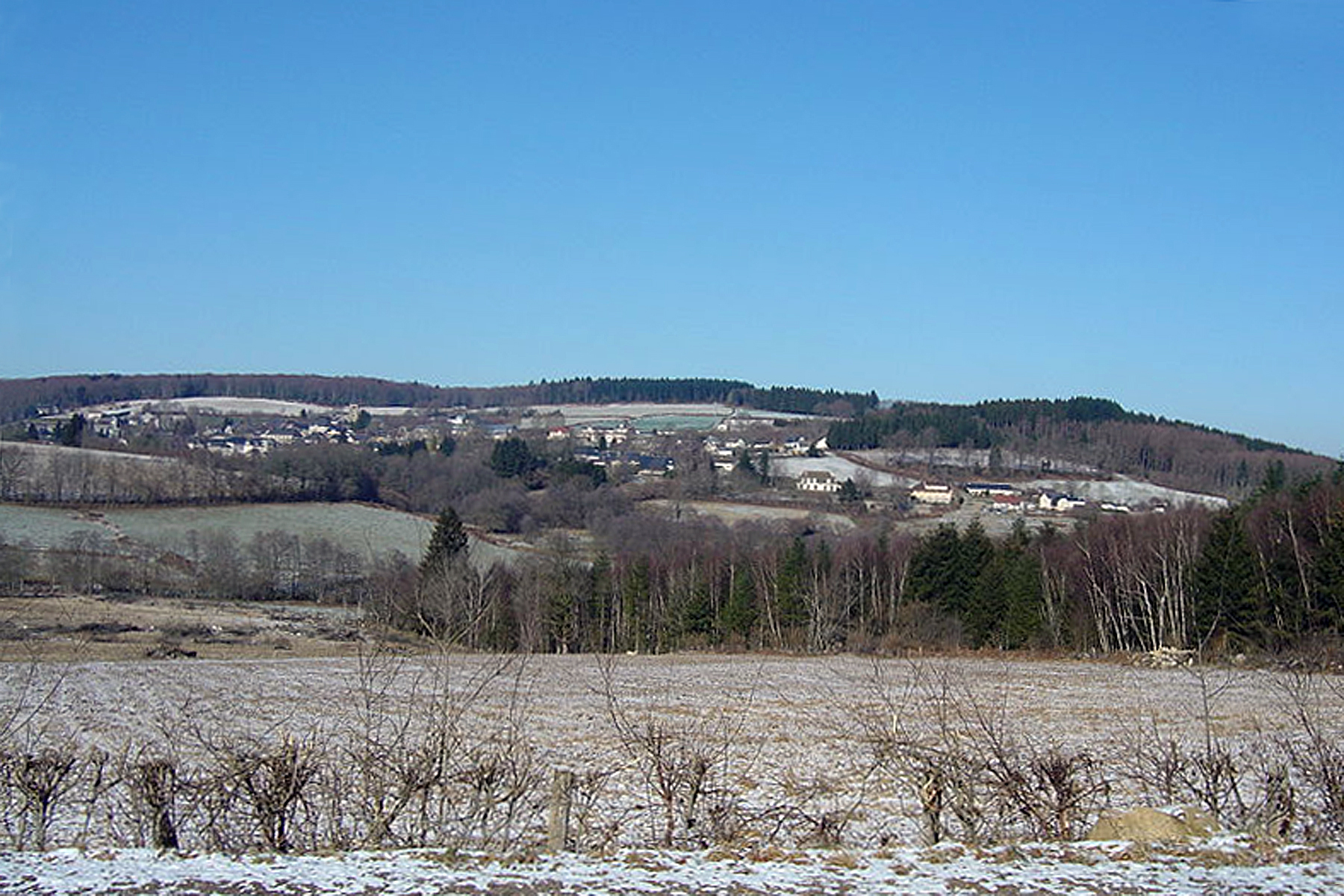
- A general view of Montsauche-les-Settons

- Coat of arms
- Location of Montsauche-les-Settons
- Location within France Location within Bourgogne-Franche-Comté
- Coordinates: 47°12′56″N 4°01′36″E
- Country: France
- Region: Bourgogne-Franche-Comté
- Department: Nièvre
- Arrondissement: Château-Chinon (Ville)
- Canton: Château-Chinon
- Intercommunality: CC Morvan Sommets et Grands Lacs

Government
  - Mayor (2020–2026): Marie Leclercq
- Area^{1}: 44.30 km^{2} (17.10 sq mi)
- Highest elevation: 701 m (2,300 ft)
- Lowest elevation: 467 m (1,532 ft)
- Population (2023): 480
  - Density: 11/km^{2} (28/sq mi)
- Time zone: UTC+01:00 (CET)
  - Summer (DST): UTC+02:00 (CEST)
- INSEE/Postal code: 58180 /58230
- ^{1} French Land Register data, which excludes lakes, ponds, glaciers > 1 km^{2} (0.386 sq mi or 247 acres) and river estuaries.

Montsauche-les-Settons (French pronunciation: [mɔ̃soʃ le sɛtɔ̃]) is a commune in the Nièvre department in the region of Bourgogne-Franche-Comté in central France. Montsauche-les Settons is completely rural, the commune composed of a settlement, half of Lac des Settons (lake), and a few dispersed hamlets.

== Geography ==

The commune of Montsauche-les Settons is centrally located in Bourgogne-Franche-Comté in the Morvan mountainous massif, at the heart of the protected natural area of the Parc naturel régional du Morvan.

The settlement, located 3 km from the lake, contains all the businesses and essential services of the area. The lake area's economy is organized around tourism, while the principal economic activity of the surrounding hamlets is raising cattle and Christmas tree farming.

The associated historical place names of the area are:

- Abattis ou Les Habattées
- Argoulois ou Argoulais (1512)
- les Avonnières or Les Avoignières
- Bois-Bouché
- Bois Grands Champs
- le Bois l'Abbesse
- Bonnin or Bonin
- Bouquin (destroyed mill)
- la Brosse
- Champ du Pont
- Champgazon or Champ-Gazon
- les Champigneux
- la Croix des Chazelles
- Creux de Fonteny or Crots de Fonteny
- le Détrapis (les Détrapés) ou les Trapis
- la Faye or la Faix (1618)
- les Branlasses
- Gadreys
- les Grands-Bois
- le Gué
- la Guette or la Gaitte (1407)
- l'Huis Gaumont
- l'Huis Grillot (hameau détruit)
- Mallerin
- Montélesme
- Montgirault
- Moulin de Nataloup(x)
- Nataloup(x) or Nathaloup (1605)
- Outre Cure or Oultre-Cure (1607)
- Palmarou(x) or Pallemarou (1638)
- Pré Gaumont
- Roche
- Rue de la Garenne (ruisseau)
- la Verrerie

== See also ==
- Communes of the Nièvre department
- Parc naturel régional du Morvan
