= Cravant, Yonne =

Cravant
- Part of Deux Rivières
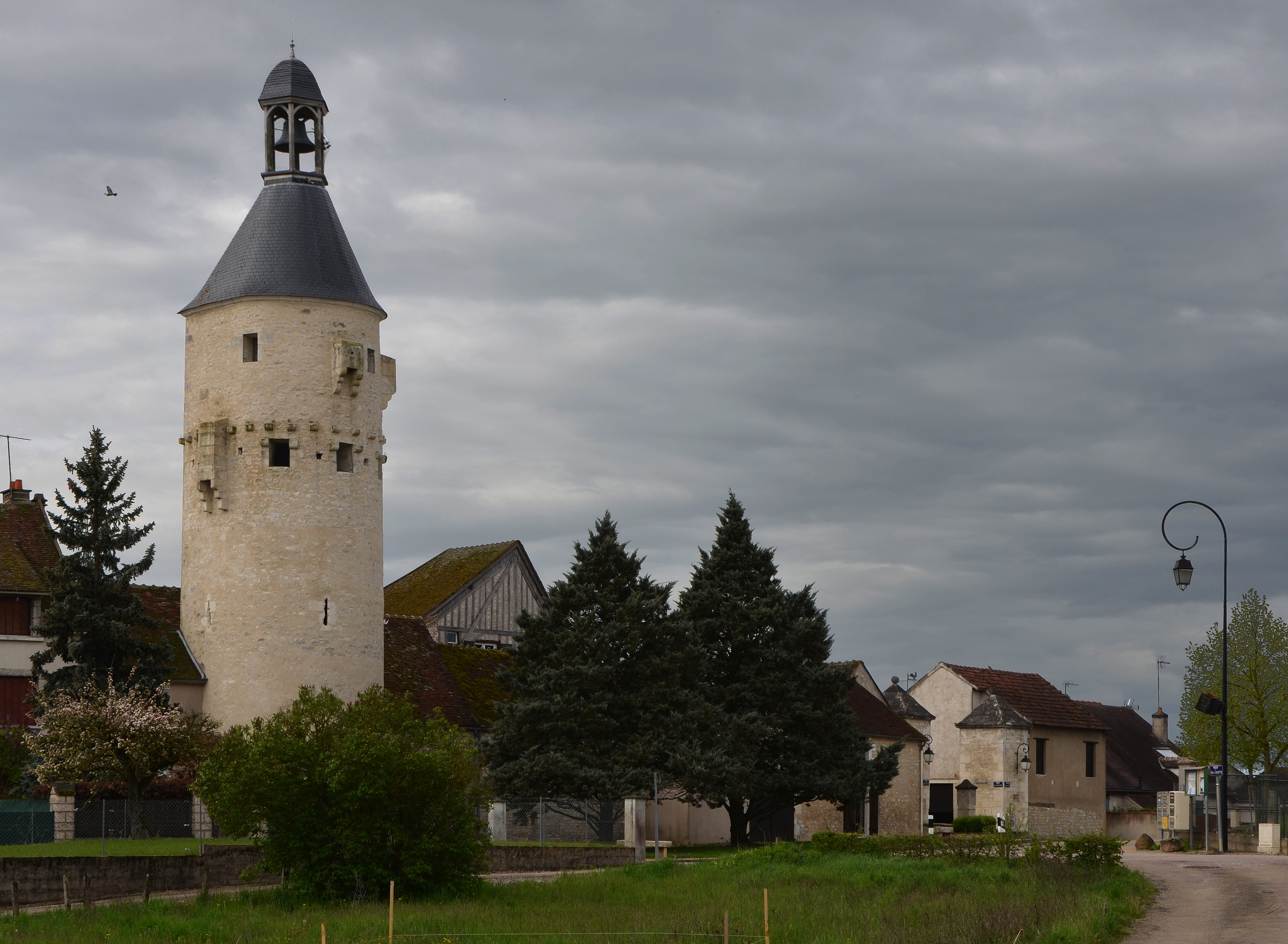
- Belfry of Cravant

- Coat of arms
- Location of Cravant
- Location within France Location within Bourgogne-Franche-Comté
- Coordinates: 47°41′02″N 3°41′30″E
- Country: France
- Region: Bourgogne-Franche-Comté
- Department: Yonne
- Arrondissement: Auxerre
- Canton: Joux-la-Ville
- Commune: Deux Rivières
- Area^{1}: 22.54 km^{2} (8.70 sq mi)
- Highest elevation: 289 m (948 ft)
- Lowest elevation: 106 m (348 ft)
- Population (2022): 820
  - Density: 36/km^{2} (94/sq mi)
- Time zone: UTC+01:00 (CET)
  - Summer (DST): UTC+02:00 (CEST)
- Postal code: 89460
- ^{1} French Land Register data, which excludes lakes, ponds, glaciers > 1 km^{2} (0.386 sq mi or 247 acres) and river estuaries.

Cravant (French pronunciation: [kʁavɑ̃]) is a former commune in the Yonne department in Bourgogne-Franche-Comté in north-central France. On 1 January 2017, it was merged into the new commune Deux Rivières.

In 1423, during the Hundred Years' War, it was the site of the Battle of Cravant between Anglo-Burgundian and Franco-Scots forces.

== See also ==
- Communes of the Yonne department
