= Morvan =

Natural region of central-east France

Coordinates: 47°05′N 4°00′E

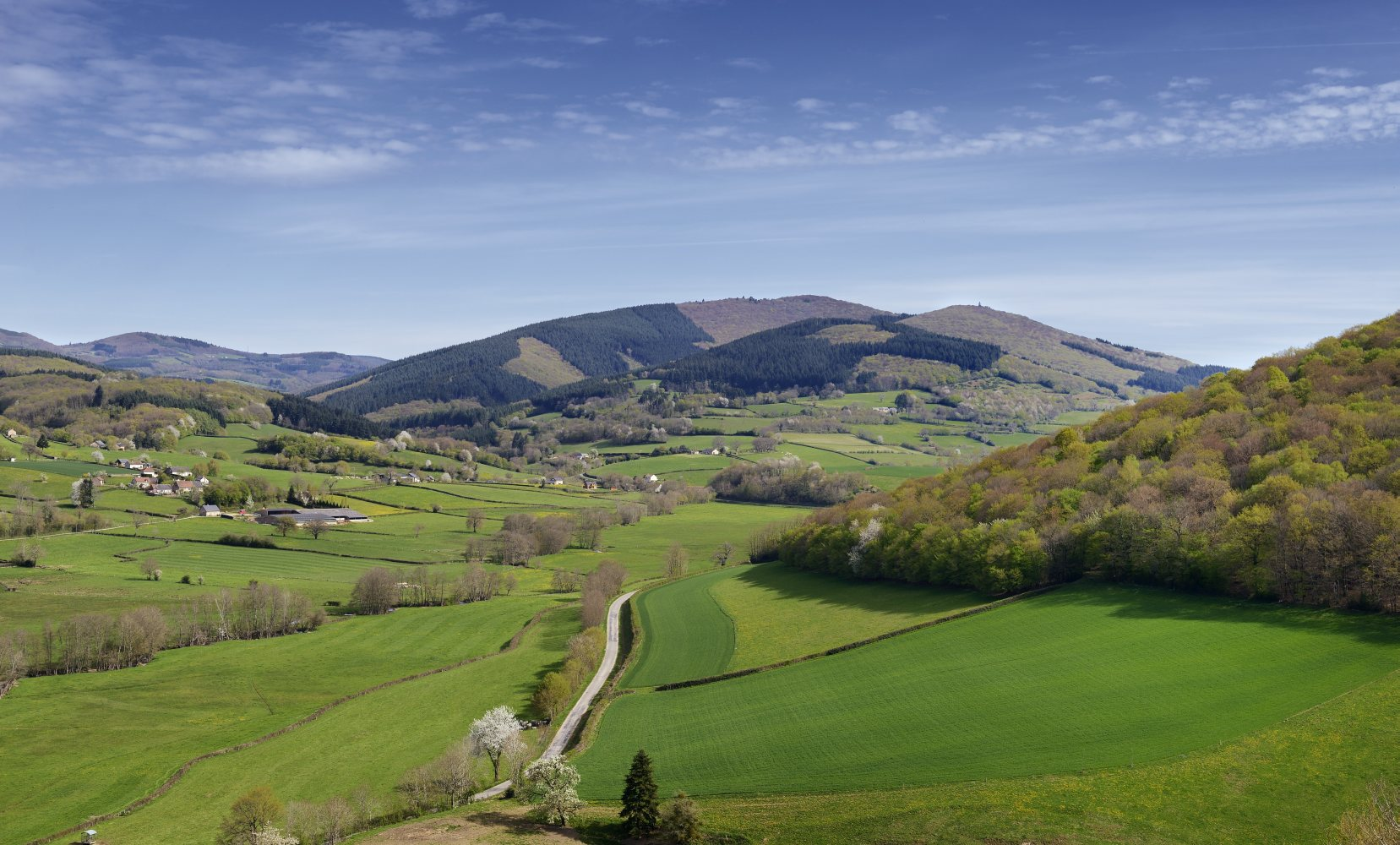
- A view of Mount Beuvray in the Morvan area, which marks the border between the Nièvre and Saône-et-Loire departments

Highest point
- Peak: Haut-Folin
- Elevation: 901 m (2,956 ft)

Geography
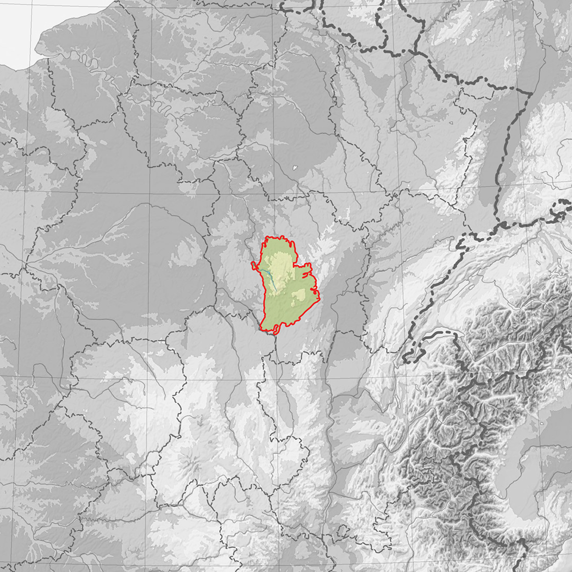
- Area covered by the range
- Country: France
- Region: Bourgogne-Franche-Comté
- Borders on: Massif Central

The Morvan (French pronunciation: [mɔʁvɑ̃]; historically Morvand from the Latin Murvinnum c. 590) is a mountainous massif lying just to the west of the Côte d'Or escarpment in the Bourgogne-Franche-Comté region, central-east France. It is a northerly extension of the Massif Central and is of Variscan age. It is composed of granites and basalts and formed a promontory extending northwards into the Jurassic sea.

It is the smallest mountain area in France in terms of landmass covered, as well as the lowest, with a maximum altitude of 901 metres (2,956 feet) at Haut-Folin.

== Geography ==
The Morvan is located across the Côte-d'Or, Nièvre, Saône-et-Loire and Yonne departments in the Bourgogne-Franche-Comté region in central-east France.

At its heart nowadays is the protected area of Morvan Regional Natural Park (French: Parc naturel régional du Morvan).

Its main town is Château-Chinon, Nièvre on the D978 road between Nevers and Autun. Several of its valleys have been dammed to form reservoirs.

Map of the cantons of the Morvan

Map of the communes of the Morvan Regional Natural Park

Geological map of the Morvan

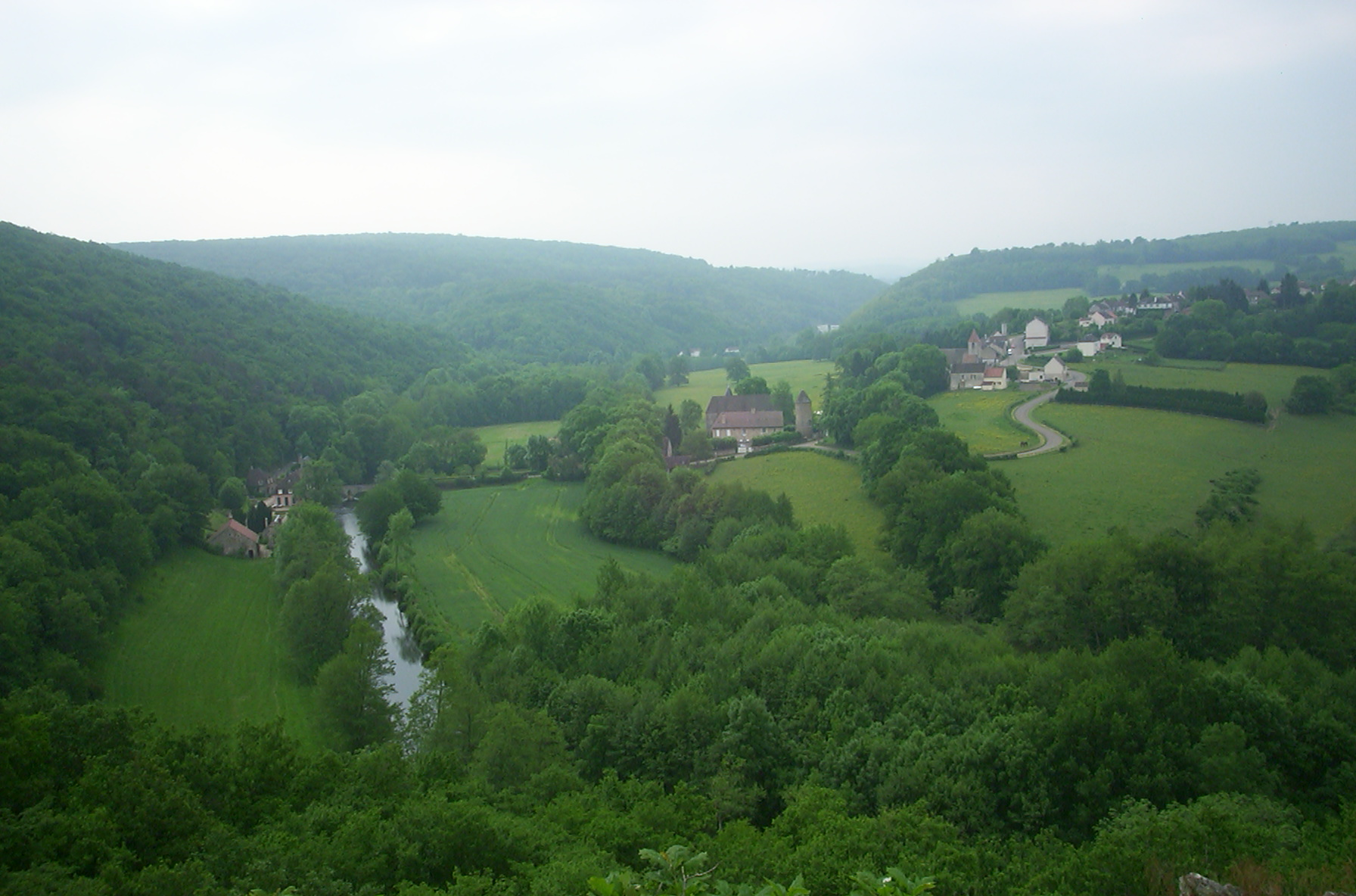
Typical landscape in the Morvan

== History ==
In World War II, just north of the demarcation line, the Morvan was an important hub for the French Resistance which had several Maquis in the area.

== Music ==
The Morvan has a strong musical tradition. It uses musical ideas from many other cultures and combines them to make its own.

== See also ==
- Château-Chinon (Campagne)
- Château-Chinon (Ville)
