= Lac à la Dame =

Lake in France

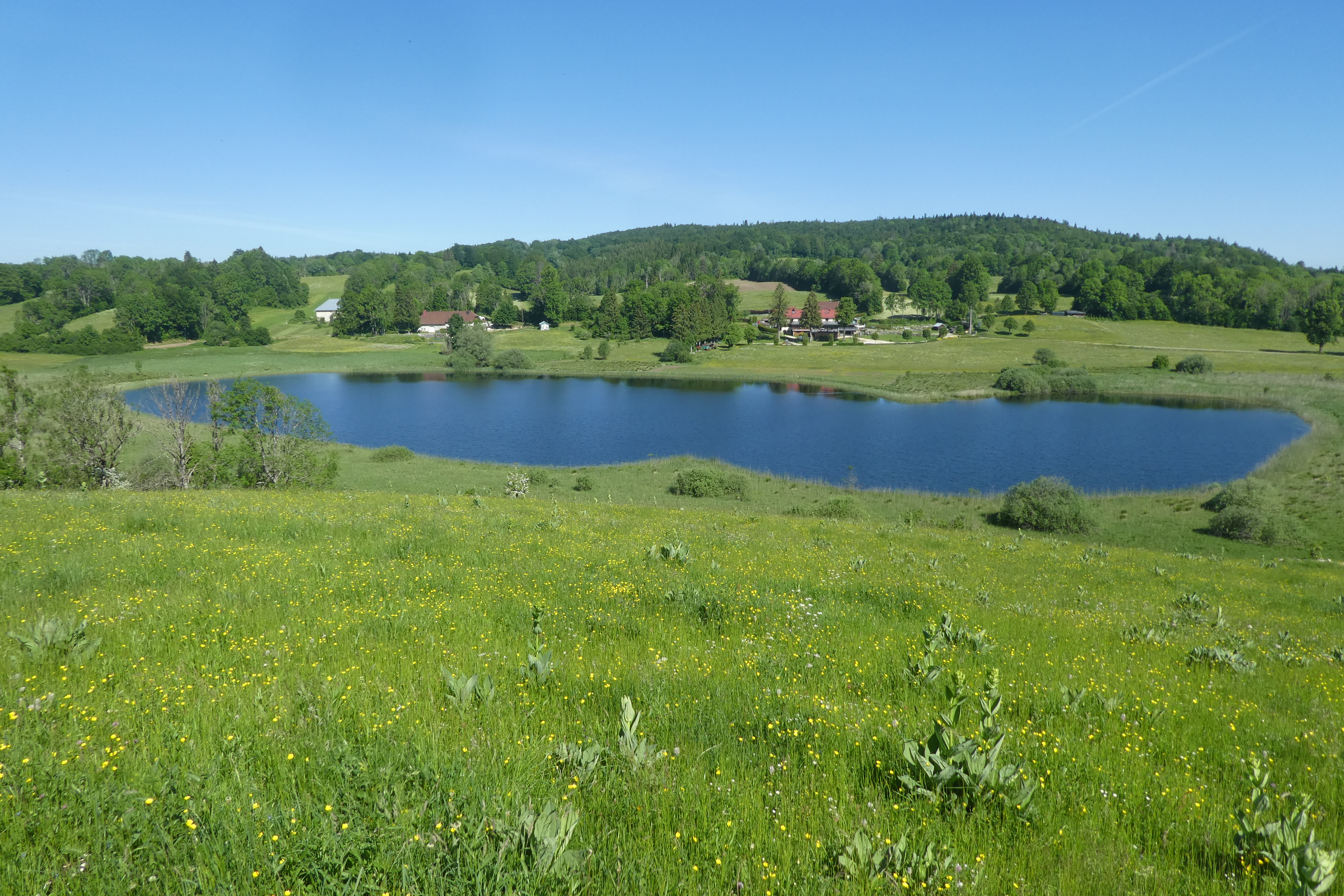

- Location within France
- Location: Jura department, Franche-Comté
- Coordinates: 46.6315°N 6.0100°E
- Primary inflows: source (Fontaine Noire)
- Primary outflows: Sange
- Basin countries: France
- Surface elevation: 878 m (2,881 ft)

Lac à la Dame is a lake at Foncine-le-Bas in the Jura department of France.

Lac à la Dame (also known as Lac de Foncine-le-Bas or Lac de la Dame) is a natural lake located in the commune of Foncine-le-Bas in the Jura department of the Bourgogne-Franche-Comté region of eastern France.

== Geography ==
The lake is situated within the Jura Mountains, a region characterized by limestone plateaus, forests, and numerous freshwater lakes. Lac à la Dame lies at an elevation of approximately 878 metres (2,881 ft) above sea level. The lake is fed by the Fontaine Noire spring and drains into the Sange River, forming part of the local hydrological network of the Jura region.

== Hydrology ==
The lake is primarily fed by natural sources including springs and runoff from surrounding slopes, particularly the Fontaine Noire source. Its outflow contributes to the local hydrological network through the Sange stream, which is part of the regional watershed system. The lake’s water balance is influenced by precipitation and seasonal runoff typical of the Jura mountain climate.

== Geological Origin ==
Lac à la Dame is of glacial origin. It was formed following the retreat of glaciers at the end of the last ice age. The depression left by glacial activity gradually filled with water, while surrounding morainic deposits contributed to water retention in the basin. Over time, natural processes have led to the development of wetland edges and peat-forming vegetation in parts of the lake.

== Ecology ==
The lake and its surroundings form a wetland ecosystem supporting a range of plant and animal species adapted to humid and montane environments. The area includes marsh vegetation and transitional habitats between open water and peatland. The ecological character of the site contributes to its inclusion in broader regional environmental interest zones in the Jura Mountains.

== Human Presence and Land Use ==
The lake is located in a rural, lightly inhabited area. Human activity around Lac à la Dame is limited, with land use primarily consisting of pasture, forestry, and nature conservation. There is no major urban development directly on the lake shoreline.
