= Lac de Darbon =

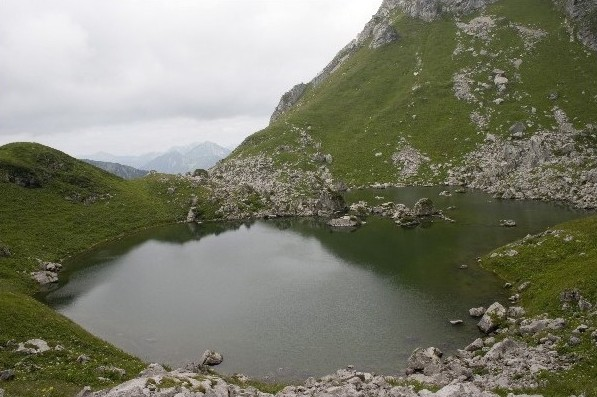

- Location within France
- Location: Vacheresse, Haute-Savoie
- Coordinates: 46°20′37″N 6°44′52″E
- Basin countries: France
- Surface area: 2 ha (4.9 acres)
- Surface elevation: 1,813 m (5,948 ft)

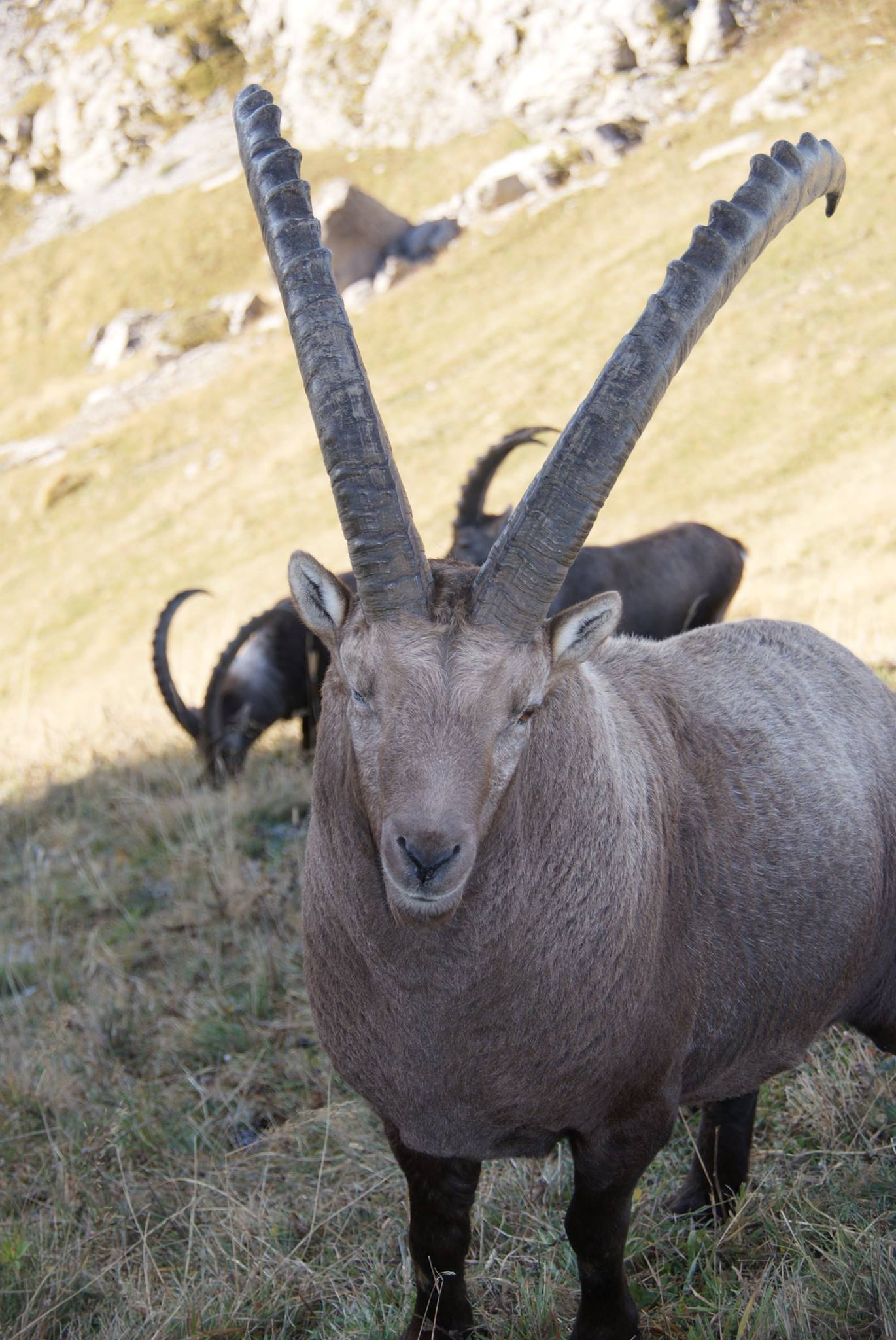
Group of ibex at Lac de Darbon

Lac de Darbon (French pronunciation: [lak də daʁbɔ̃]) is a lake in Haute-Savoie, France. Located at an elevation of 1,813 m, its surface area is 2 ha.

This is a remote area, reachable only by 4WD. The 'chalets' near the lake were burned down by German forces during WW2 as they were used by the resistance as the remote area was perfect for arms and ammunition dropped by the Allied forces.

The lake area is the home of numerous ibex, Alpine marmots, and snakes.
