= Lac de Chanon =

Lake in France

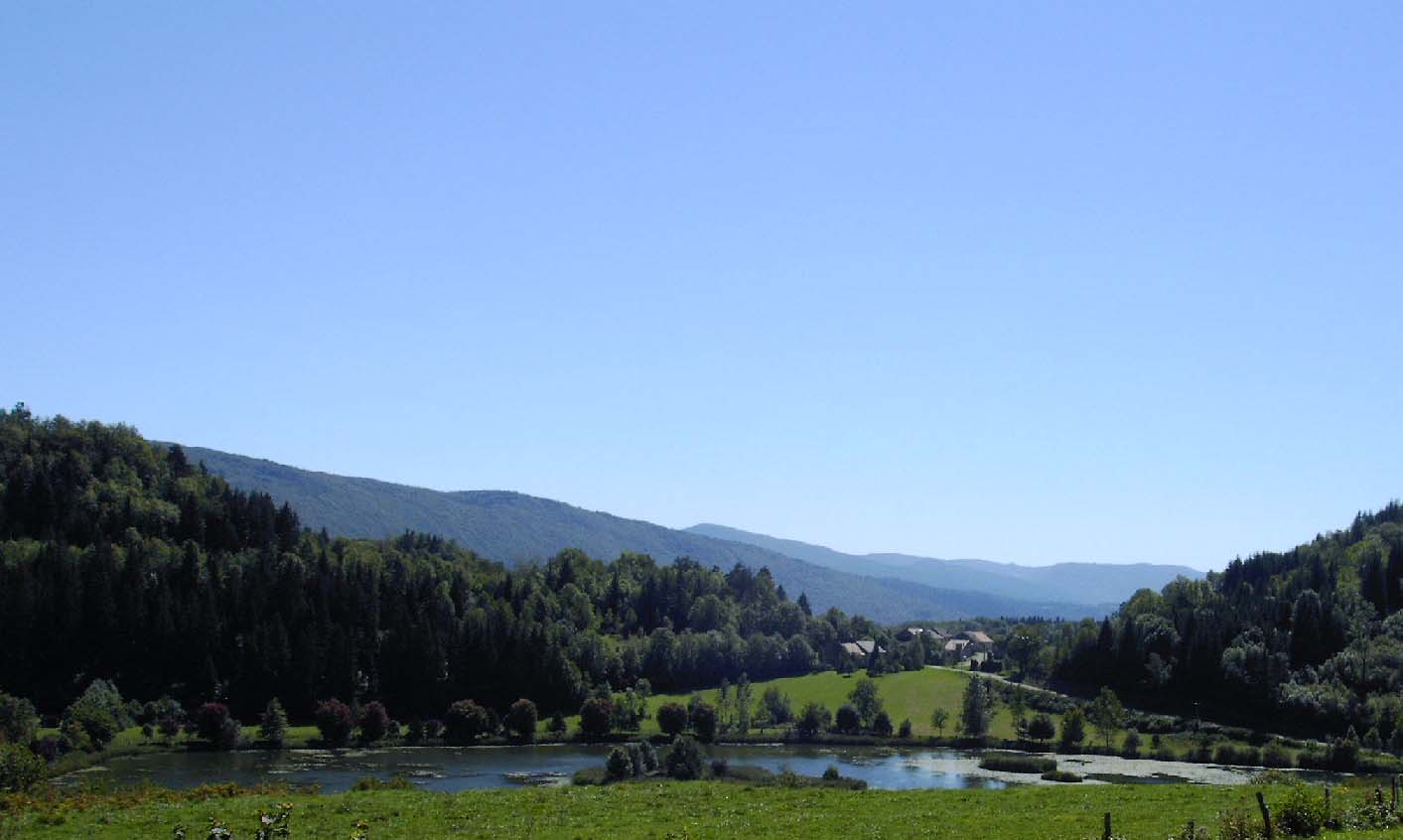
- Lac de Chanon, Jura, France

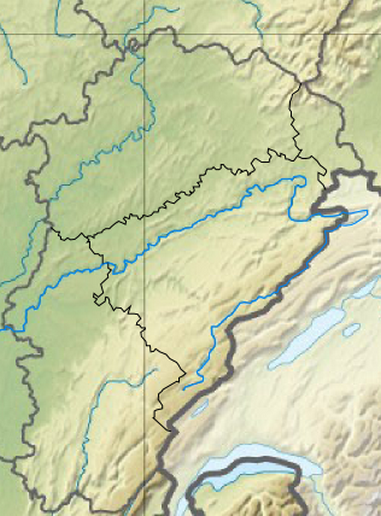
- Location within Franche-Comté
- Location: Jura department, Franche-Comté
- Coordinates: 46°22′53″N 5°41′52″E
- Basin countries: France

Lac de Chanon is a lake in Martigna, in the Jura department of France.
