= Lac de Bareilles =

Lake in France

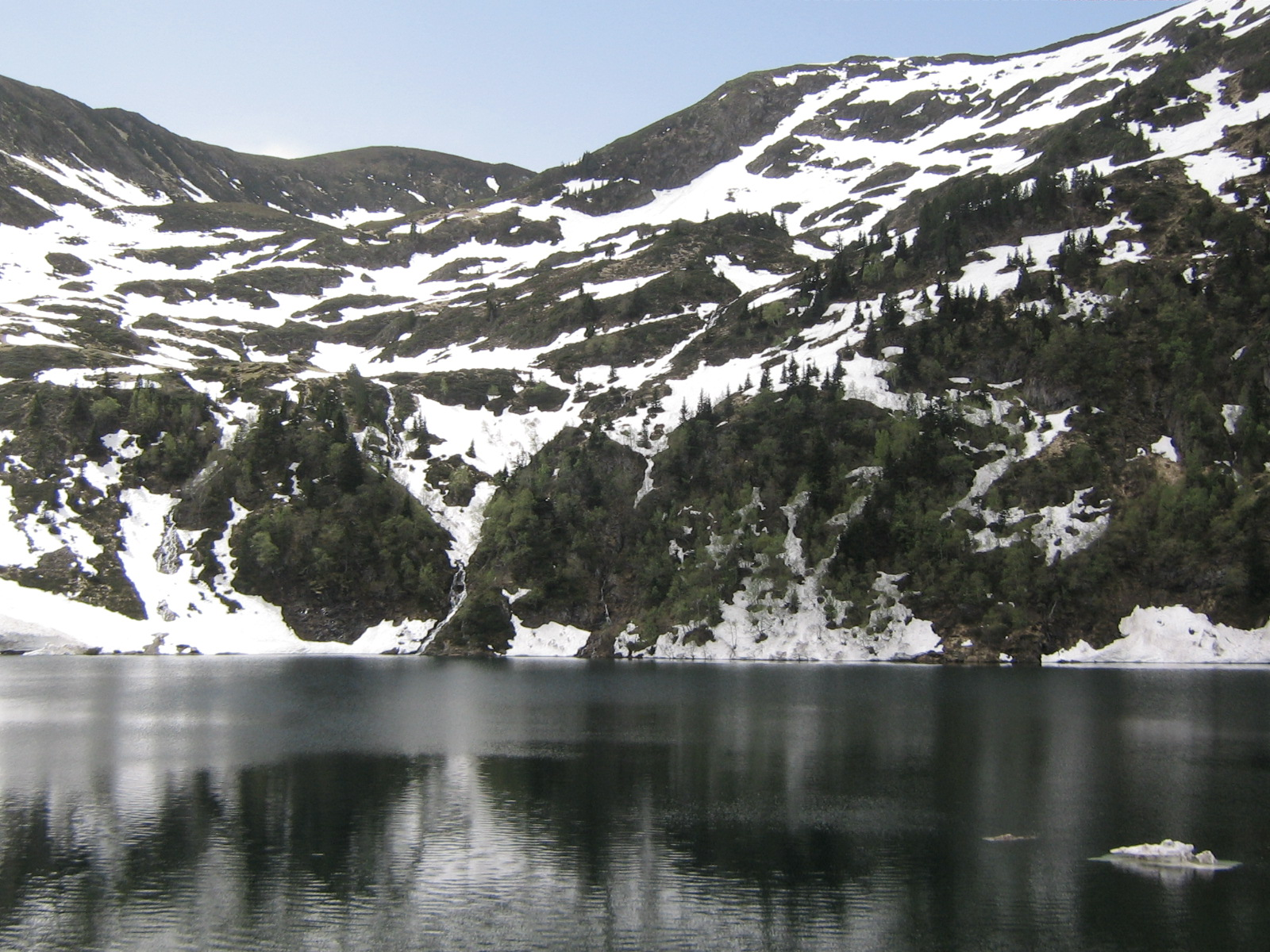

- Location within France
- Location: Hautes-Pyrénées
- Coordinates: 42°51′36″N 00°27′36″E
- Basin countries: France
- Surface elevation: 1,760 m (5,770 ft)

Lac de Bareilles is a lake in Hautes-Pyrénées, France. The lake can be reached by foot from the village of Bareilles in about 30 minutes.
