= Étang des Redouneilles des brebis =

Lake in Ariège, France

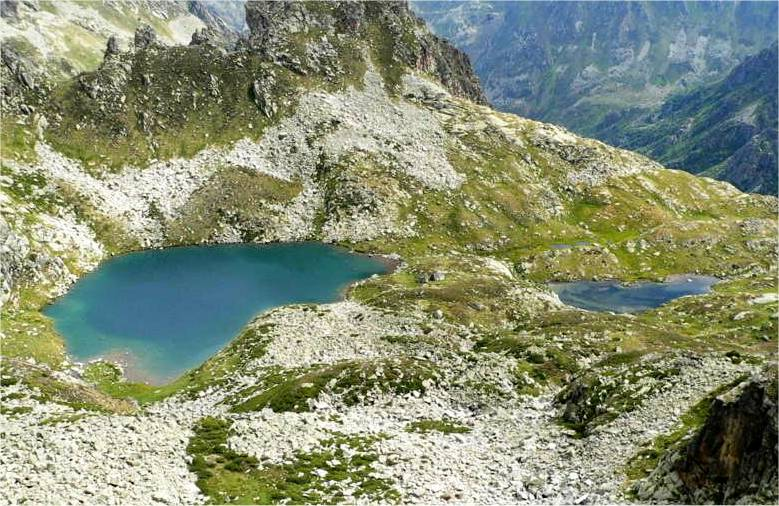

- Location within France
- Location: Ariège
- Coordinates: 42°41′10″N 01°33′06″E
- Basin countries: France
- Surface area: 0.015 km^{2} (0.0058 sq mi)
- Surface elevation: 2,228 m (7,310 ft)

Étang des Redouneilles des brebis (French pronunciation: [etɑ̃ de ʁədunɛj de bʁəbi]) is a lake in Ariège, France. At an elevation of 2,228 m (7,310 ft), it has a surface area of 0.015 km^{2} (0.0058 mi^{2}).

== See also ==
- Étang des Redouneilles des vaches
