= Étang des Redouneilles des vaches =

Lake in France

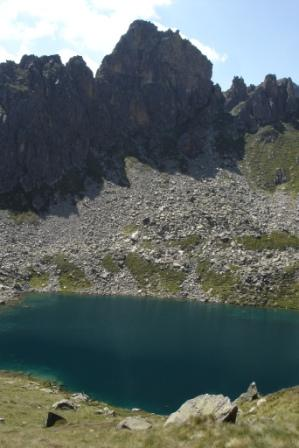

- Location within France
- Location: Ariège
- Coordinates: 42°41′26″N 01°33′21″E
- Basin countries: France
- Surface elevation: 2,127 m (6,978 ft)

Étang des Redouneilles des vaches is a lake in Ariège, France.

== See also ==
- Étang des Redouneilles des brebis
