= Klintzkopf =

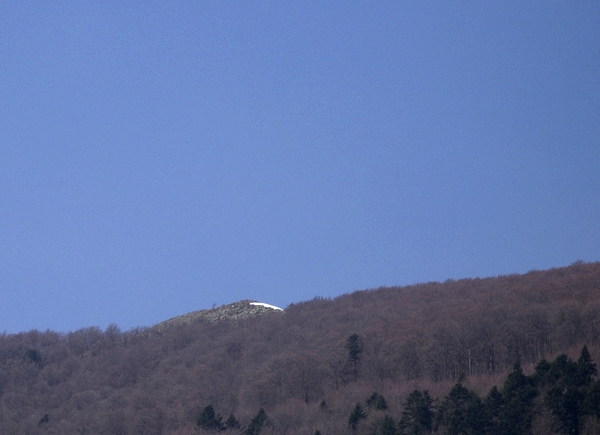
- The Klintzkopf seen from the Heidenfelsen

Highest point
- Elevation: 1,330 m (4,360 ft)
- Coordinates: 47°56′58″N 7°03′22″E

Geography
- Location within France
- Location: Alsace, France
- Parent range: Vosges Mountains

The Klintzkopf, located in the French region of Alsace, is the fifth-highest summit of the Vosges Mountains.

== Geography ==
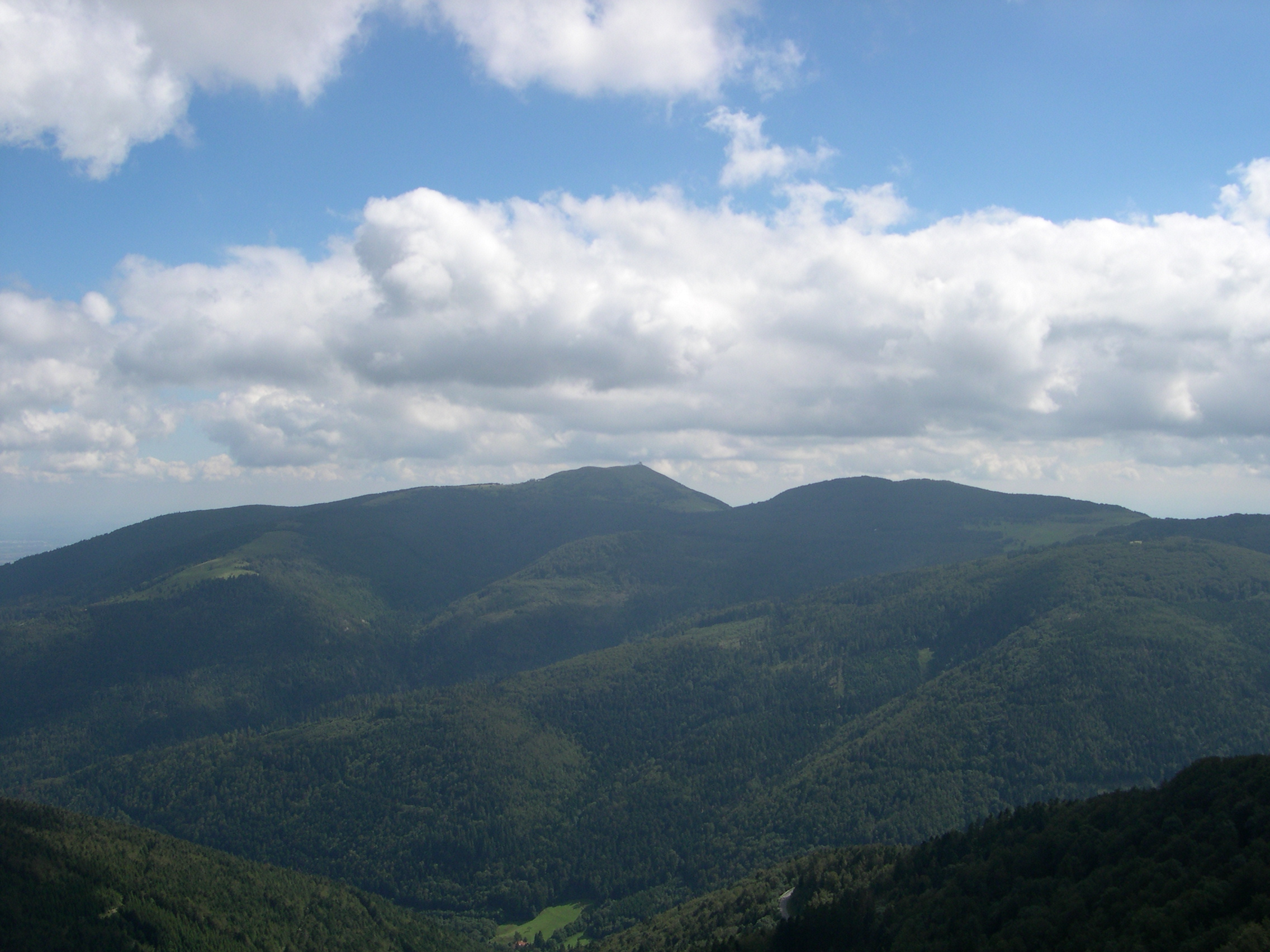
Panoramic view from the summit

The mountain is divided between the French municipalities of Guebwiller and Munster (department of Haut-Rhin, Alsace).

The Klintzkopf is part of a nature reserve and it only can be accessed from July to November. It hosts the highest beech forest of the Vosges Mountains.

To the northwest lies the Lauchenkopf.

== Access to the summit ==
The summit of the Klintzkopf can be accessed on foot from the nearby Route des Crêtes. It offers a good point of view of the southern part of the Vosges Mountains.

== See also ==
- Hohneck
- Vosges Mountains
