= Col de la Schlucht =

Mountain pass in France

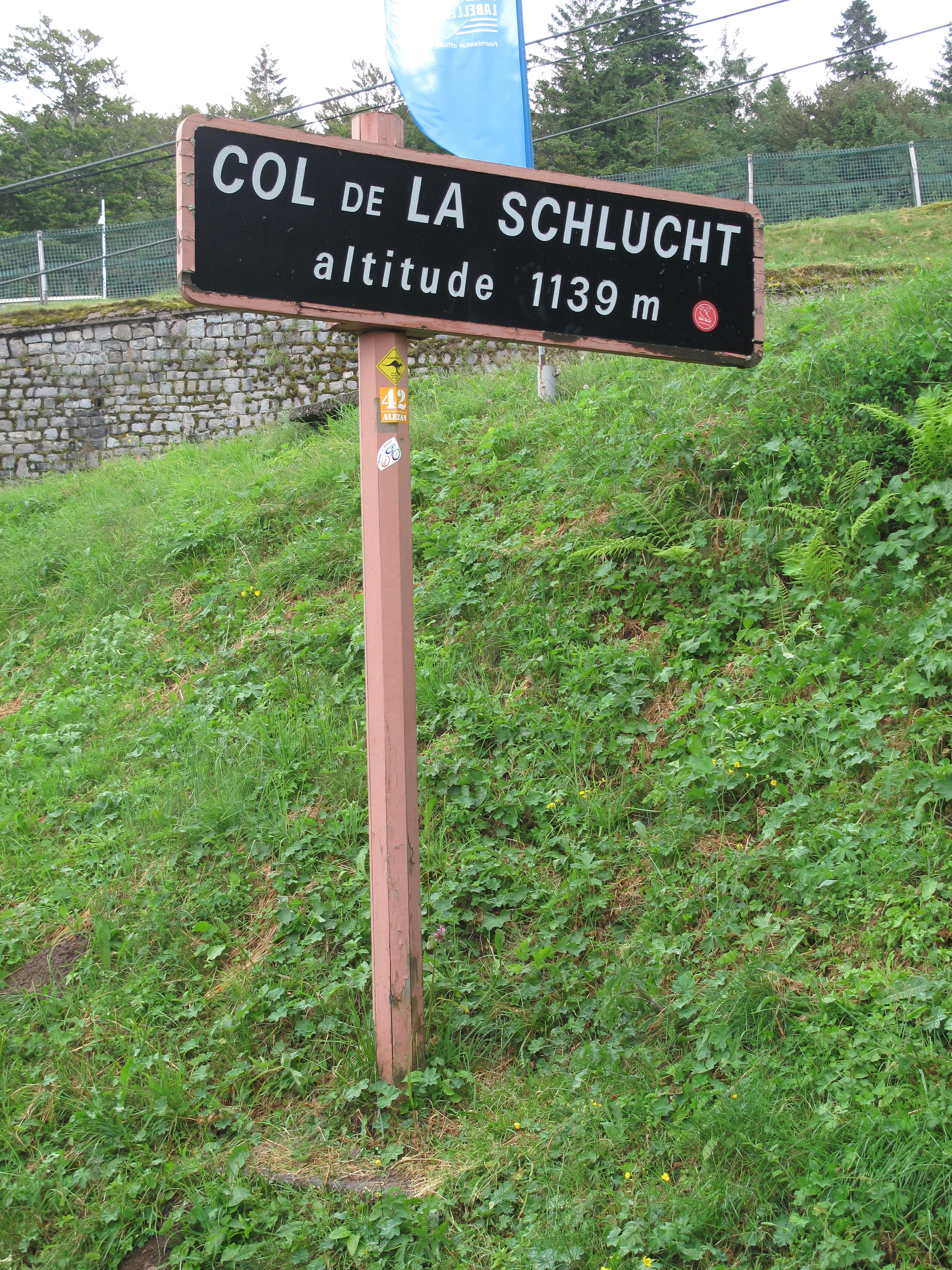
- Signpost

- Location within France
- Elevation: 1,139 m (3,737 ft)
- Traversed by: D417

Third Approach
- Location: Haut-Rhin / Vosges, France
- Range: Vosges Mountains
- Coordinates: 48°3′50″N 7°1′21.6″E

The Col de la Schlucht (French pronunciation: [kɔl də la ʃluxt]; elevation 1,139 m (3,737 ft)) is a mountain pass in the Vosges Mountains of France. On the west side lies the historical region of Lorraine (Lothringen in German), on the east side lies the historical region of Alsace (Elsass in German).

The pass takes its name from the German word "Schlucht", meaning "gorge" or "ravine". It connects Munster (Haut-Rhin) with Gérardmer (Vosges) (east–west, via the D417) and is also crossed by the Route des Crêtes (north–south, D61 and D430).

Near the Col, along the Route des Crêtes (D430) is the source of the Meurthe.

The climb over the pass has been used several times in the Tour de France cycle race.

== History ==
Between 1871 and 1918, the pass was a border crossing between Lorraine (France) and Alsace, which had been ceded to Germany under the Treaty of Frankfurt.

Prior to World War I, the pass could be accessed via two separate tramway lines, from Gérardmer (opened 1904) and Munster (opened 1907) respectively. Both lines were abandoned at the outbreak of the war; that from Munster was never re-opened, whereas the line from Gérardmer continued in service until 1940.

== Facilities ==
Winter sports

Col de la Schlucht is reputed to have the first ski-lift in the Vosges and has long been a popular destination for wintersports such as cross-country skiing and alpine skiing. It is also a popular area for snowshoeing.

Hiking

There are many trails marked by Club Vosgien. The most famous is probably the Sentier des Roches, a rocky footpath along the edge of a ridge near the Col which is closed in winter. This is considered to be one of the most impressive (and dangerous) Alsatian mountain paths. It is a part of GR 531 and can be used to go to Hohneck via Frankenthal.

Col de la Schlucht also lies on GR 5 and GRP Tour de la Vologne.

Lifts and luge

The lifts usually keep working in summer. The seats can carry a backpack or even a bicycle, making it possible to go mountain biking (a mountain bike is a VTT in French).

There is a ski-lift up Montabey; from the top of the ski-lift, in summer, there is a luge run back down to the Col.

== Details of the climbs ==
From the west, the climb starts at Le Kertoff, 4 km (2 mi) before Gérardmer. From here, the climb is 17.0 km (10.6 mi) long gaining 531 m (1,742 ft) in height at an average gradient of 3.1%. The steepest section is at 6.7%. This was the climb used in the 2009 Tour de France.

The climb from the east starts at Munster from where there are 18.0 km (11.2 mi) to the summit, gaining 759 m (2,490 ft) in height. The overall average gradient is 4.2%, which is maintained fairly steadily throughout the climb.

From La Bresse (south-west), the ascent via D34 is 16.2 km (10.1 mi) long climbing 494 m (1,621 ft) at an average gradient of 3.0%. This climb passes the Col des Feignes (954 m (3,130 ft)) en route, after which there are 2 km (1 mi) at between 7 and 8%.

From Fraize (north-west), the climb is 21.0 km (13.0 mi) at an average of 3.0%, gaining 652 m (2,139 ft) in height.

From Xonrupt-Longemer (west), the climb is 10.0 km (6.2 mi) at an average gradient of 4.2%, gaining 421 m (1,381 ft).

The summit can also be accessed via Route des Crêtes from the Col du Bonhomme (north) or the Col du Grand Ballon (south).

== Tour de France ==
The climb over the pass was first used on stage 20 of the 1931 Tour de France, when the summit was crossed by a group of riders, although André Leducq was the first across the line after the descent into Colmar.

=== Appearances in the Tour de France (since 1947) ===
Since World War II, the col has been crossed eight times, either as a Category 2 or Category 3 climb.

Year	Stage	Category	Start	Finish	Leader at the summit
2023	20	3	Belfort	Le Markstein Fellering	Giulio Ciccone (ITA)
2014	9	2	Gérardmer	Mulhouse	Thomas Voeckler (FRA)
2009	13	2	Vittel	Colmar	Rubén Pérez (ESP)
2005	8	2	Pforzheim	Gérardmer	Andreas Klöden (DEU)
1992	11	2	Strasbourg	Mulhouse	Fabio Roscioli (ITA)
1973	5	2	Nancy	Mulhouse	Charly Grosskost (FRA)
1970	9	2	Saarlouis	Mulhouse	Silvano Schiavon (ITA)
1969	5	3	Nancy	Mulhouse	Mariano Díaz (ESP)
1961	6	3	Strasbourg	Belfort	Jef Planckaert (BEL)
