= Col du Grand Ballon =

Mountain pass in France

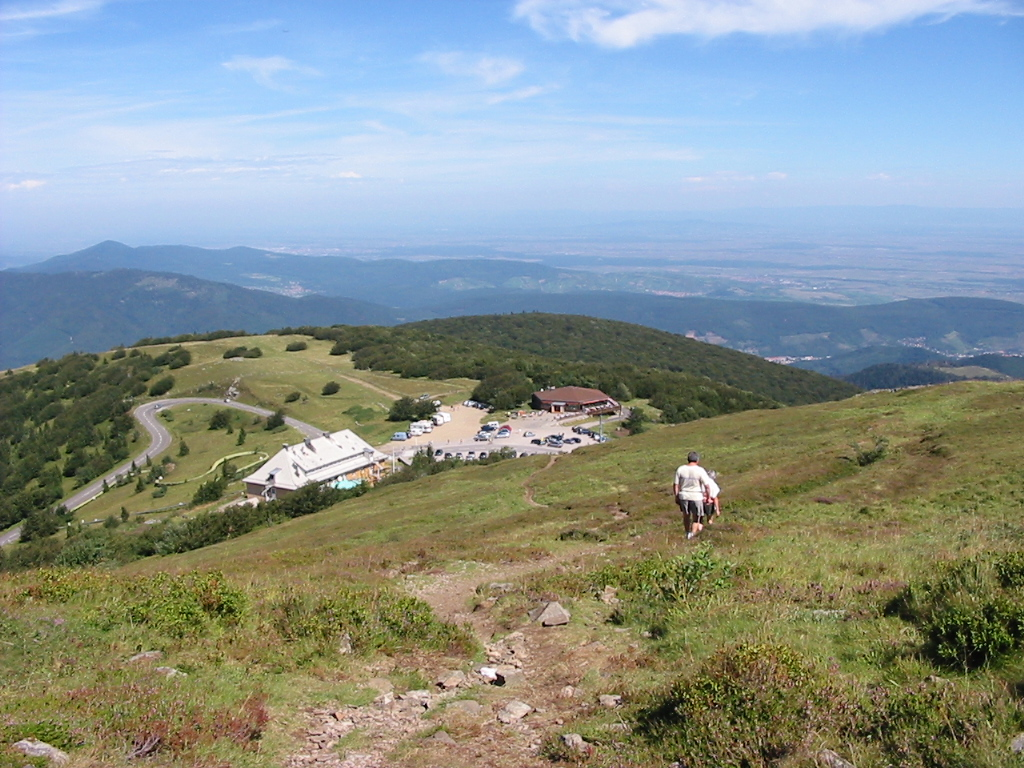
- The col viewed from the slopes of the Grand Ballon

- Location within Alps
- Elevation: 1,343 m (4,406 ft)
- Traversed by: D431

Third Approach
- Location: Vosges, France
- Range: Vosges Mountains
- Coordinates: 47°54′17″N 7°6′12″E

The Col du Grand Ballon (French pronunciation: [kɔl dy ɡʁɑ̃ balɔ̃]; elevation 1,343 m (4,406 ft)) is a mountain pass situated close to the summit of the Grand Ballon (1,424 m (4,672 ft)) in the Vosges Mountains of France. It connects Cernay (Haut-Rhin) with Le Markstein winter sports station.

== Details of the climbs ==
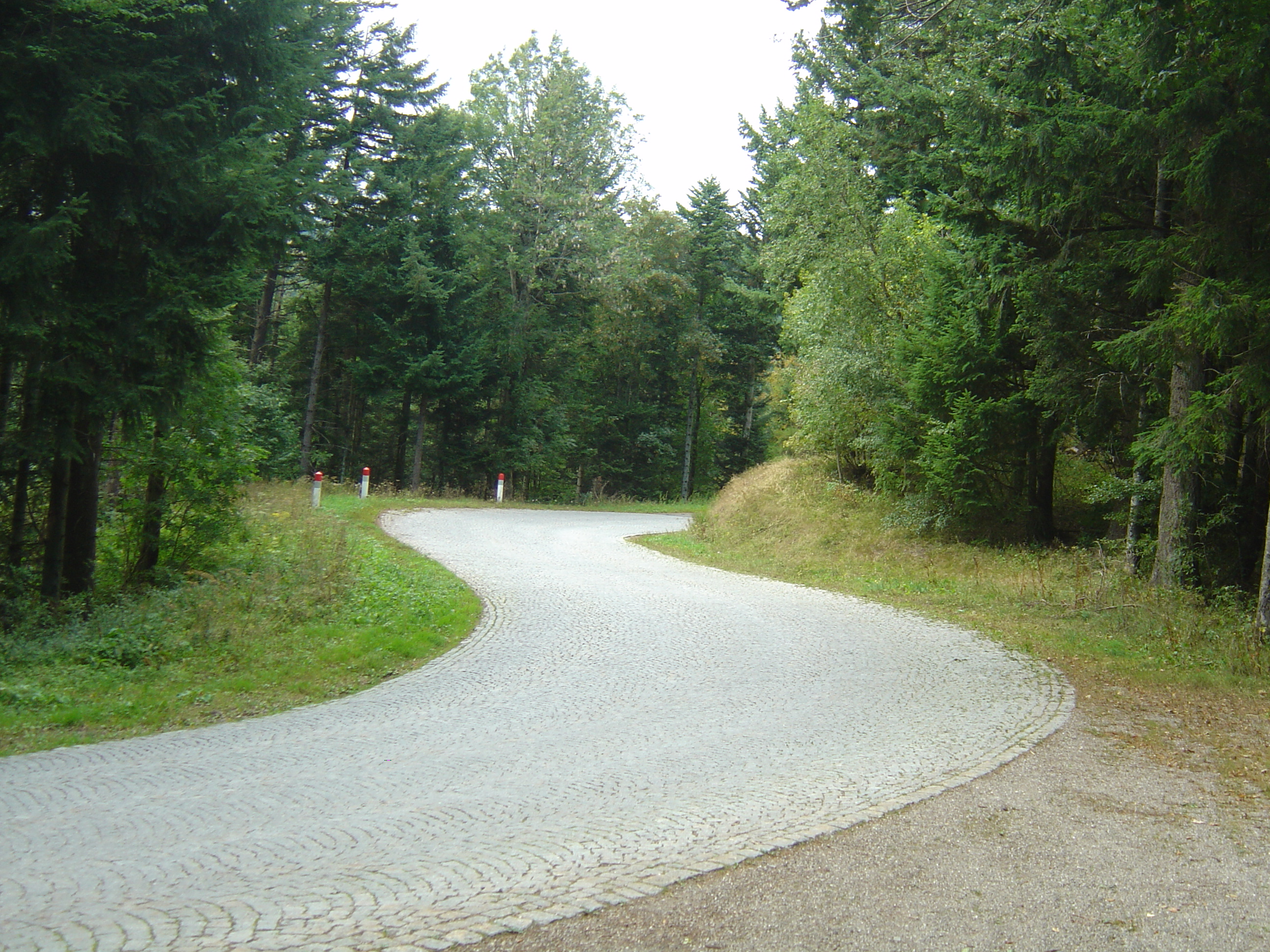
Pavė section after Col Amic

There are several different directions from which the Col du Grand Ballon can be climbed:

From Cernay (south-east), the total distance is 23.1 km (14.4 mi) at an average gradient of 4.5%, gaining 1,048 m (3,438 ft) in height. This route follows the Route des Crêtes over the Col de Herrenfluh (835 m (2,740 ft)) after 9.5 km (5.9 mi). After a short descent, the road climbs again to the Col de Silberloch (906 m (2,972 ft)) before descending to the Col Amic (828 m (2,717 ft)). From here, there remain 6.8 km (4.2 mi) at an average of 7.6%. In the forest on this final section, there are two short paved stretches. 3 km (1.9 mi) from the summit, the gradient increases to over 8%.

From Willer-sur-Thur (south), the ascent (via D138) is 16.0 km (9.9 mi) long, climbing 974 m (3,196 ft) at an average of 6.1%. This route joins that from Cernay at the Col Amic.

From the south it is also possible to climb on minor roads from Saint-Amarin or Moosch, both on the N66; these routes join together at Geishouse. Both routes are approximately 12.5 km (7.8 mi) long at an average of over 7%, with a kilometre section near the summit at 12%.

From Soultz (east), the route follows a minor road for the first 12.0 km (7.5 mi) at a steady average gradient of 4.6%, before joining the other routes at Col Amic. In total, the climb is 19.0 km (11.8 mi) long, climbing 1,072 m (3,517 ft) at an average of 5.6%.

From Kruth (west), the climb (via D27) is 22.9 km (14.2 mi) long gaining 853 m in height at an average of 3.7%. This climb joins the D431 at Le Markstein.

== Tour de France ==
The Tour de France first crossed over the Col du Grand Ballon in 1969, when the leader over the summit was Lucien Van Impe. It has been crossed on a further eight occasions, the most recent in 2026.

Year	Stage	Category	Start	Finish	Leader at the summit
2026	14	1	Mulhouse	Le Markstein Fellering	Valentin Paret-Peintre (FRA)
2019	6	3	Mulhouse	La Planche des Belles Filles	Thomas de Gendt (BEL)
2014	9	3	Gérardmer	Mulhouse	Tony Martin (GER)
2005	9	2	Gérardmer	Mulhouse	Michael Rasmussen (DEN)
1997	18	2	Colmar	Montbéliard	Francesco Casagrande (ITA)
1992	11	1	Strasbourg	Mulhouse	Laurent Fignon (FRA)
1976	7	3	Nancy	Mulhouse	Giancarlo Bellini (ITA)
1973	5	3	Nancy	Mulhouse	Charly Grosskost (FRA)
1969	6	3	Mulhouse	Ballon d'Alsace	Lucien Van Impe (BEL)

== Tour de France Femmes ==
The col was crossed on Stage 7 of the 2022 Tour de France Femmes.

Year	Stage	Category	Start	Finish	Leader at the summit
2022	7	1	Sélestat	Le Markstein Fellering	Annemiek van Vleuten (NED)

== Amateur cycling ==
The Col du Grand Ballon is also used by amateur cyclists on the "Trois Ballons" sportive ride held in June (together with the climbs over the Ballon d'Alsace and the Ballon de Servance).
