= Storkenkopf =

Mountain in France

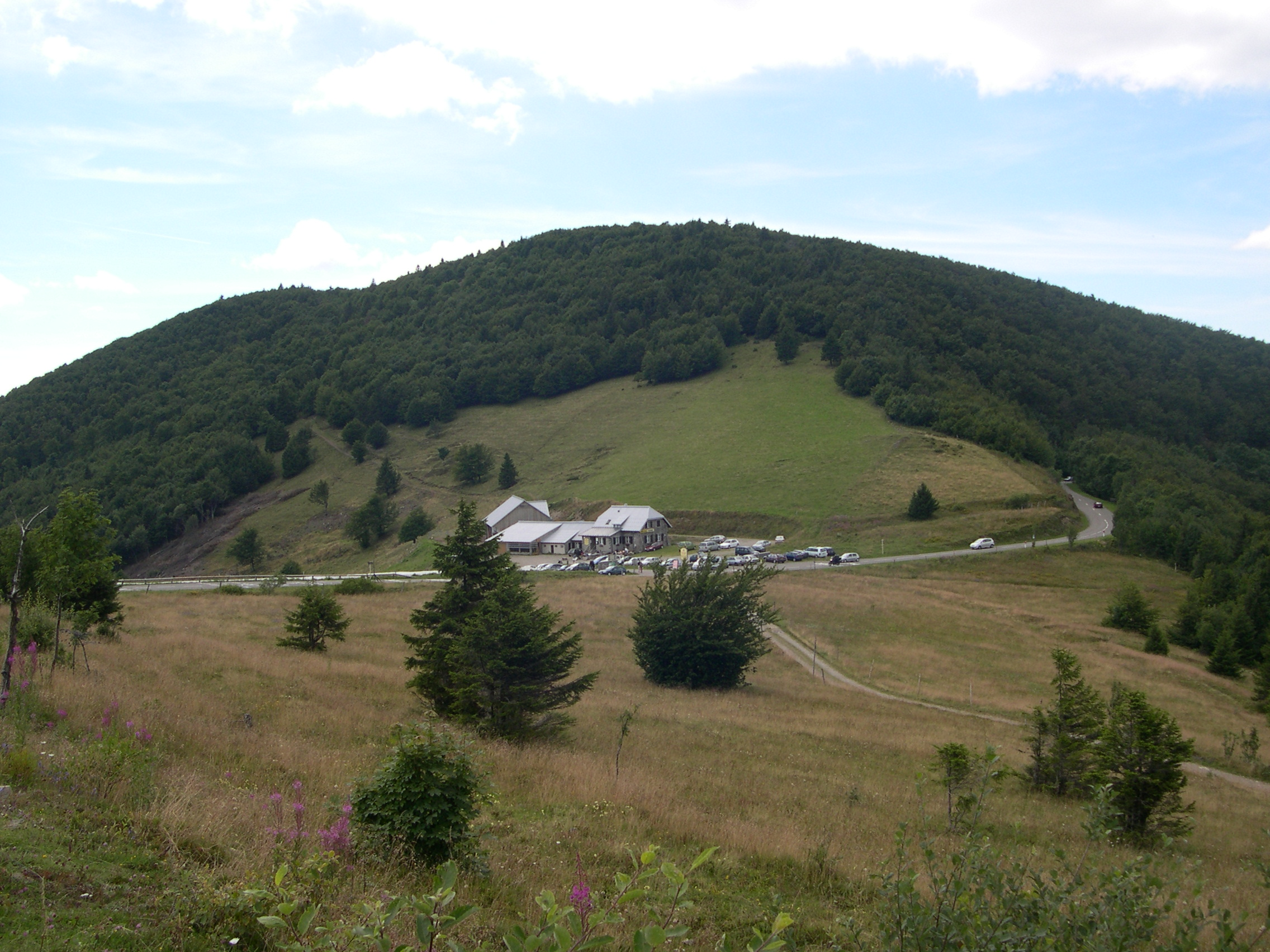
- The Storkenkopf

Highest point
- Elevation: 1,366 m (4,482 ft)
- Prominence: 133 m (436 ft)
- Isolation: 1.14 km (0.71 mi)
- Coordinates: 47°54′17″N 7°04′56″E

Geography
- Location within France
- Location: Alsace, France
- Parent range: Vosges Mountains

The Storkenkopf is the second-highest summit of the Vosges Mountains. It is located in the French region of Alsace, close to the Grand Ballon.

== Etymology ==
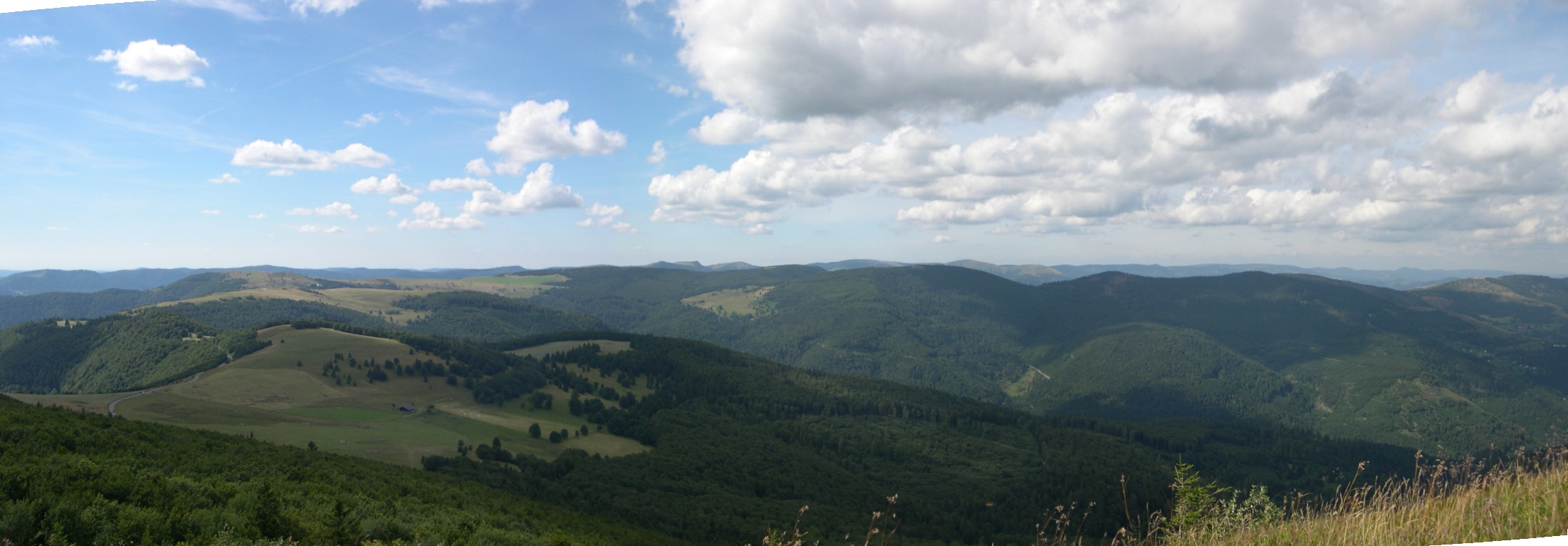
View over the central part of Vosges mountains from the Storkenkopf

In German and in Alsatian Storkenkopf means "storks' head".

== Geography ==
The mountain is divided between the French municipalities of Saint-Amarin, Geishouse, and Lautenbachzell, all belonging to the Haut-Rhin department. Near the mountain's top is the ferme du Haag, a farm which also provides accommodation.

== Access to the summit ==
The well known Route des Crêtes (French for "road of the peaks") transits not faraway from the top of the mountain, which is possible to reach on foot following a forest service road for about 2 km (1.2 mi).
