= Lauchenkopf =

Peak in the Vosges Mountains

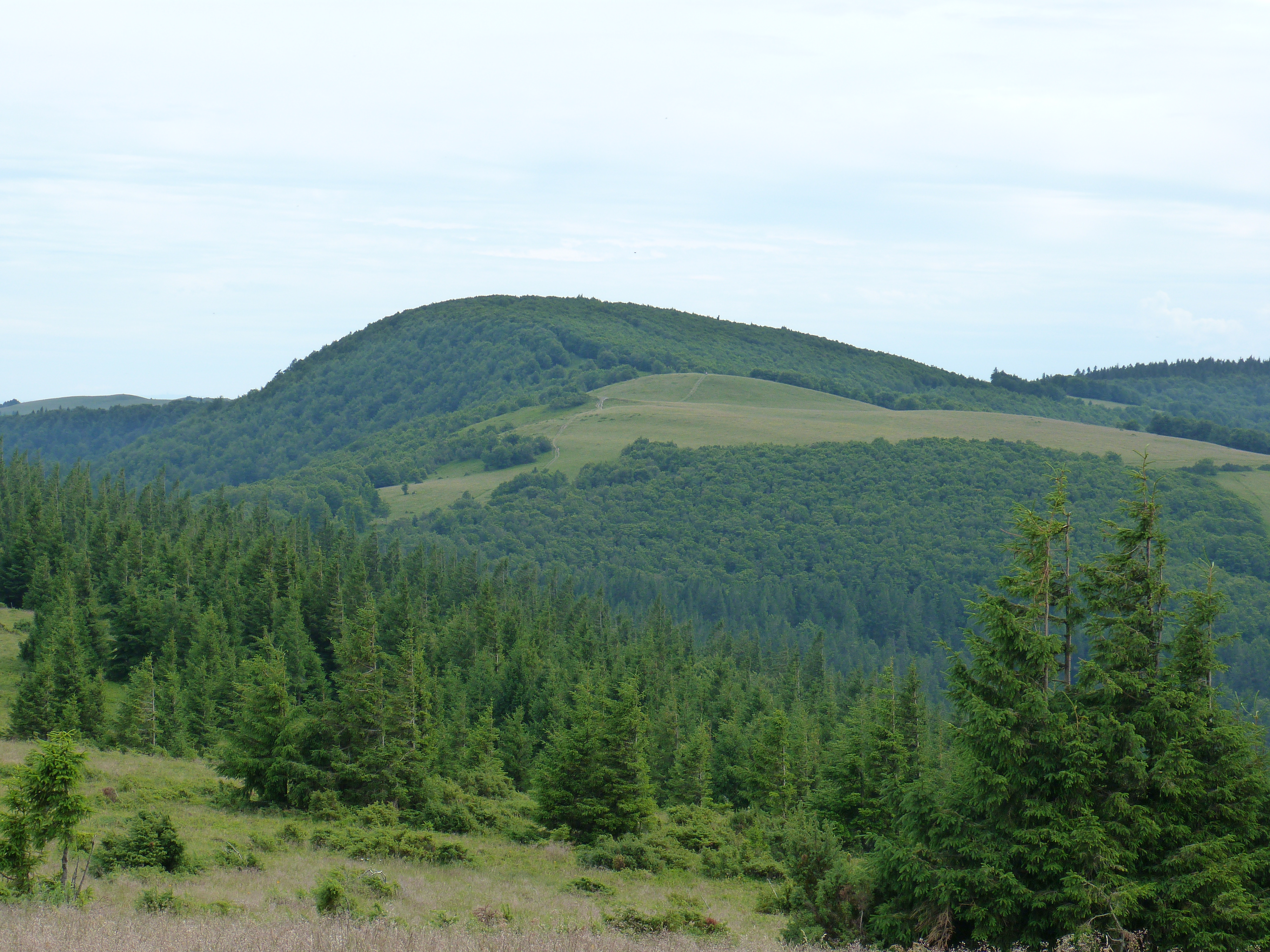
- View of Lauchenkopf from Schnepfenriedkopf.

Highest point
- Elevation: 1,314 m (4,311 ft)
- Coordinates: 47°57′22″N 7°02′22″E

Geography
- Location within France
- Location: Alsace, France
- Parent range: Vosges Mountains

The Lauchenkopf is a peak in the Vosges Mountains, reaching an altitude of 1,314 meters, north of Markstein.

== Toponymy ==
This summit ridge is named Inlochen in the Upper Rhine archives in 1496 and Lauchensluck in 1738. The Lac de la Lauch or Lauchensee gives it its name, as it does today in French.

== Geography ==
The Lauchenkopf is located northwest of the Breitfirst, a summit that marks a southward break in the ridge line of the Haut-Rhin region, initiated between the Rainkopf and Rothenbachkopf and extended to the southwest by the Batteriekopf, then southwest by the Schweisel, the Hundskopf up to the Col du Hahnenbrunnen.

The Grande Fecht originates on the western slope of the Lauch massif (French) or the Lauchen (Alsatian).

== History ==
The summit has belonged at least since the Carolingian period to the Abbey of Munster, and then since the 13th century to the inhabitants of the Munster valley. It is thus part of the pastures and forests granted under the administration of the Alsatian free town of Munster, until the end of the Ancien Régime. Only its southern slope belonged to the Abbey of Murbach, particularly the pasture and forest of Oberlauchen overlooking the Lauch Lake were managed by the priory of Lauterbach.

== See also ==
- Vosges Mountains
