= Kastelberg =

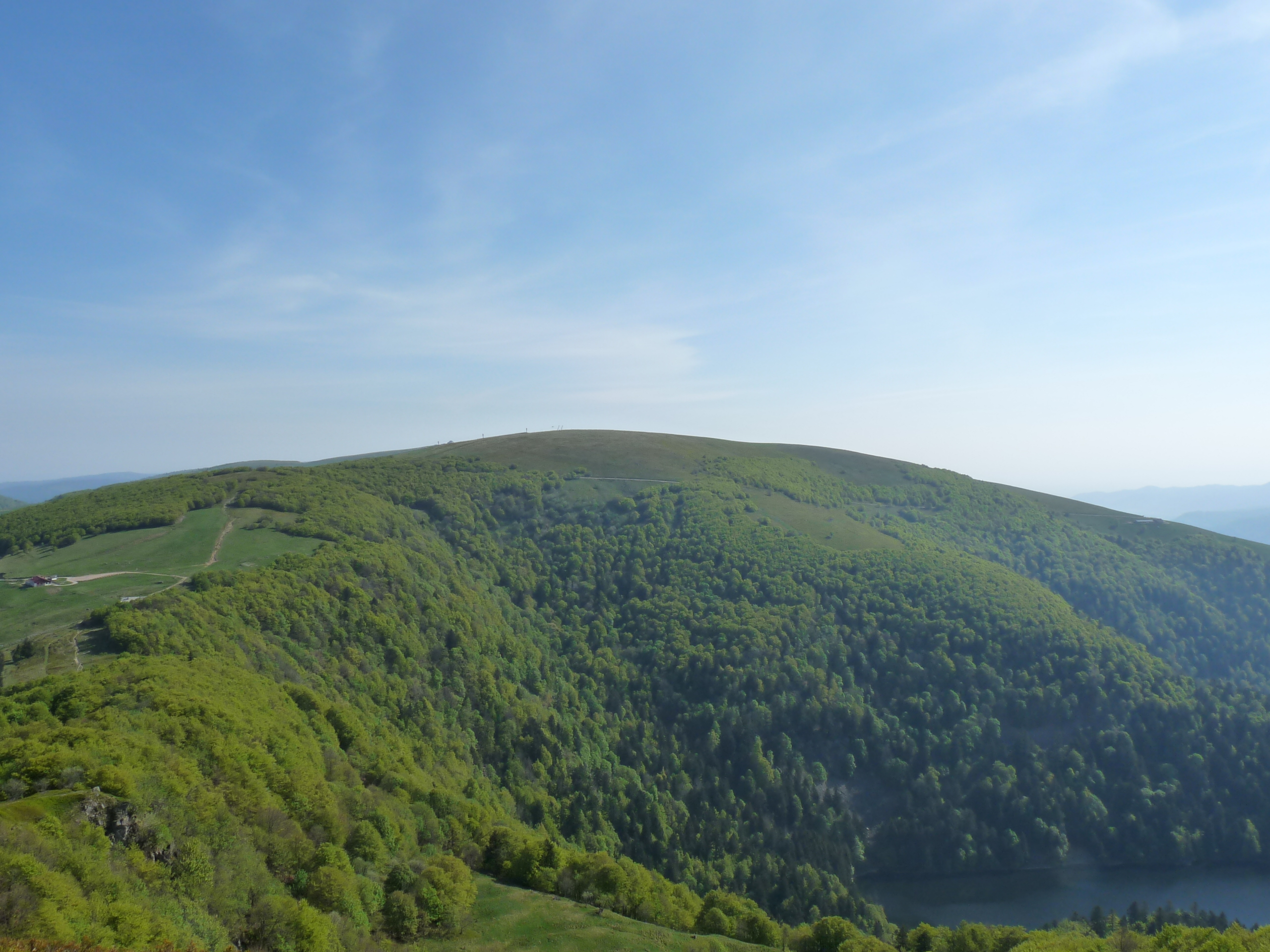
- The Kastelberg seen from the Rainkopf

Highest point
- Elevation: 1,350 m (4,430 ft)
- Prominence: 70 m (230 ft)
- Coordinates: 48°01′16″N 7°00′05″E

Geography
- Location within France
- Location: Alsace / Lorraine, France
- Parent range: Vosges Mountains

The Kastelberg is the fourth highest summit of the Vosges Mountains. It is located on the former border between the French regions of Alsace and Lorraine.

== Etymology ==
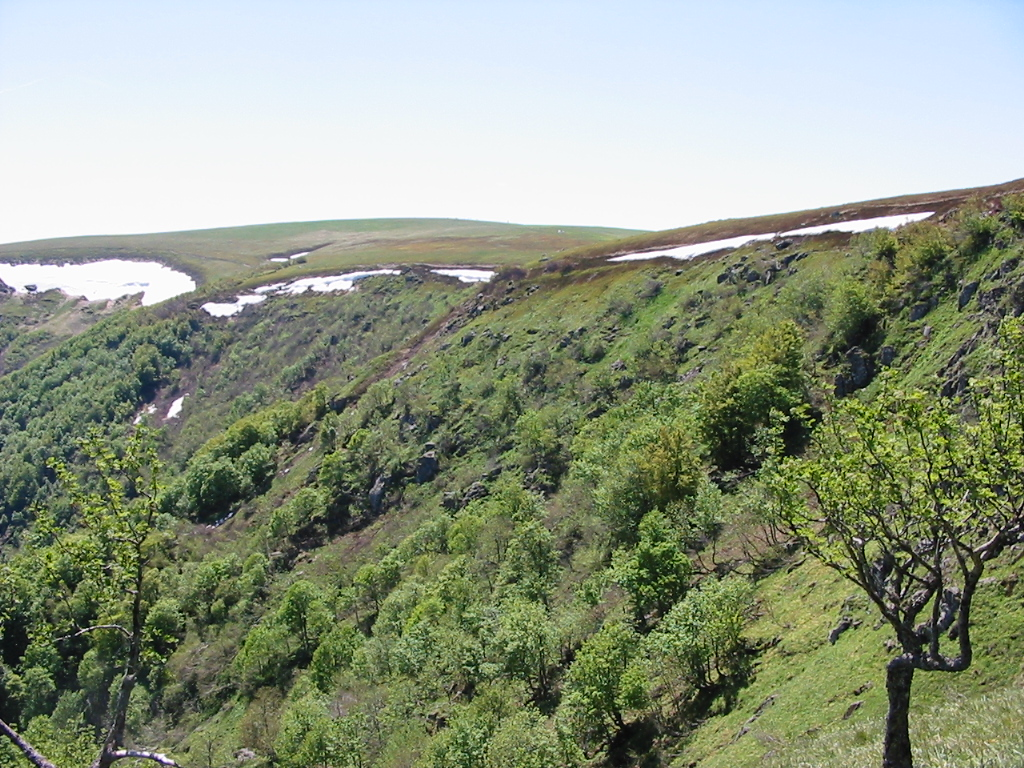
View of the Alsacian slopes of the mountain in early June (year:2006), with the last snow of the Vosges mountains ending to melt

In German Kastelberg means mountain of the castle.

== Geography ==
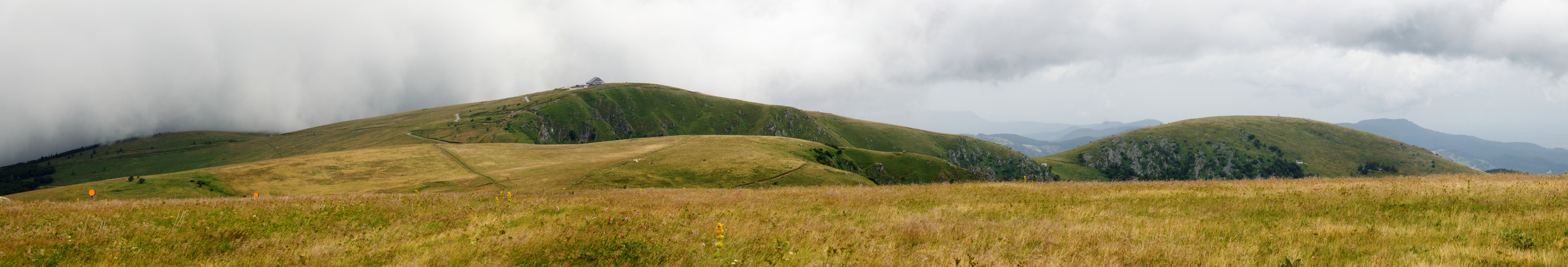
Panorama from the mountain

The mountain is divided between the French municipalities of La Bresse (dep. of Vosges, Lorraine) and Metzeral (dep. of Haut-Rhin, Alsace). Nearby the mountain, on its Lorraine side, there is the ski resort of La Bresse, which offers an area served by skilifts ranging from 650 metres to 1350 metres as well as 50 km of cross country ski trails.

A locality of the Kastelberg named Wormsawald-Ammelthal (literally swallow's nest) harbours the most sturdy snowfield of the Vosges, which usually lasts up to July or, remarkably, to August.)

== See also ==
- Hohneck
- Vosges Mountains
