= Hohneck (Vosges) =

Mountain in France

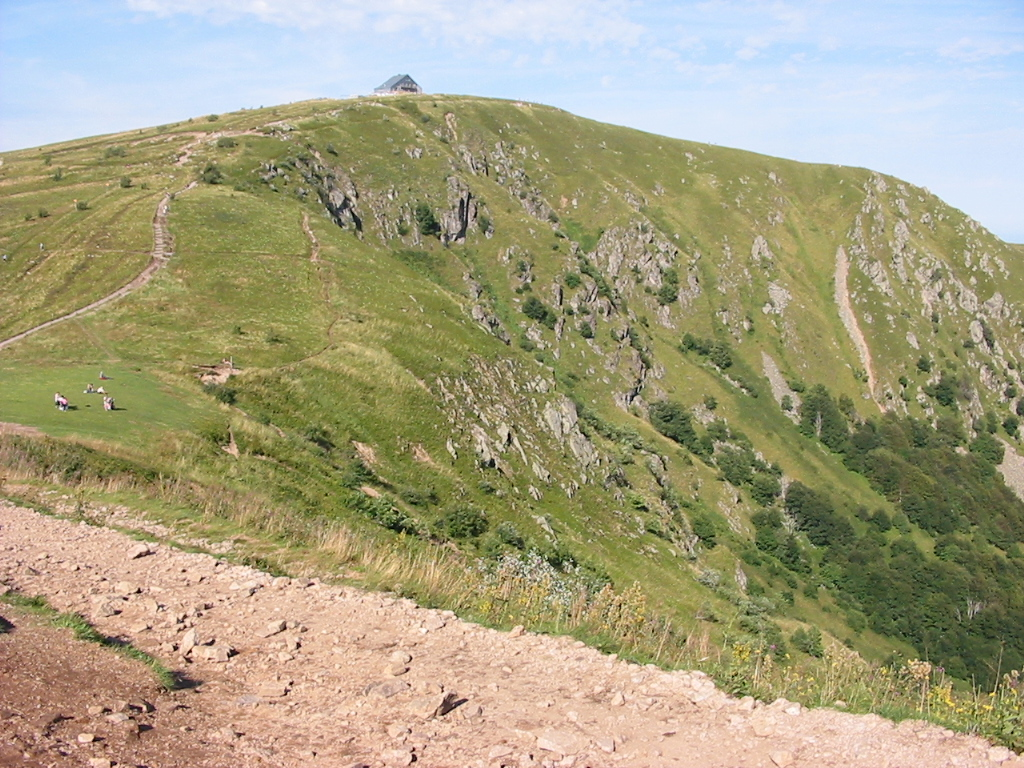
- The Hohneck

Highest point
- Elevation: 1,363 m (4,472 ft)
- Isolation: 15.54 km (9.66 mi)
- Coordinates: 48°02′15″N 7°00′59″E

Geography
- Location within France
- Location: Alsace, Lorraine; France
- Parent range: Vosges Mountains

The Hohneck is, at 1,363 m (4,472 ft), the third highest summit of the Vosges Mountains (after Grand Ballon [1,424 m; 4,672 ft] and Storkenkopf [1,366 m; 4,482 ft]) and the highest point of Lorraine. On its summit stands a mountain hut, clearly visible in the distance. Near the mountain's top is the ski resort of La Bresse Hohneck.

== Geography ==
The mountain is divided between the French municipalities of La Bresse (dep. of Vosges), Metzeral (department of Haut-Rhin) and Stosswihr (department of Haut-Rhin). A 1,289 m (4,229 ft) mountain, located 1.5 km (1 mi) east of the Hohneck, is named Petit Hohneck (in English, Little Hohneck).

On a clear day, from the Hohneck summit, it is possible to spot not just the entire Vosges range but also the Black Forest, the Jura, a good part of the Swiss Alps and, in the distance, the Mont Blanc.

== History ==
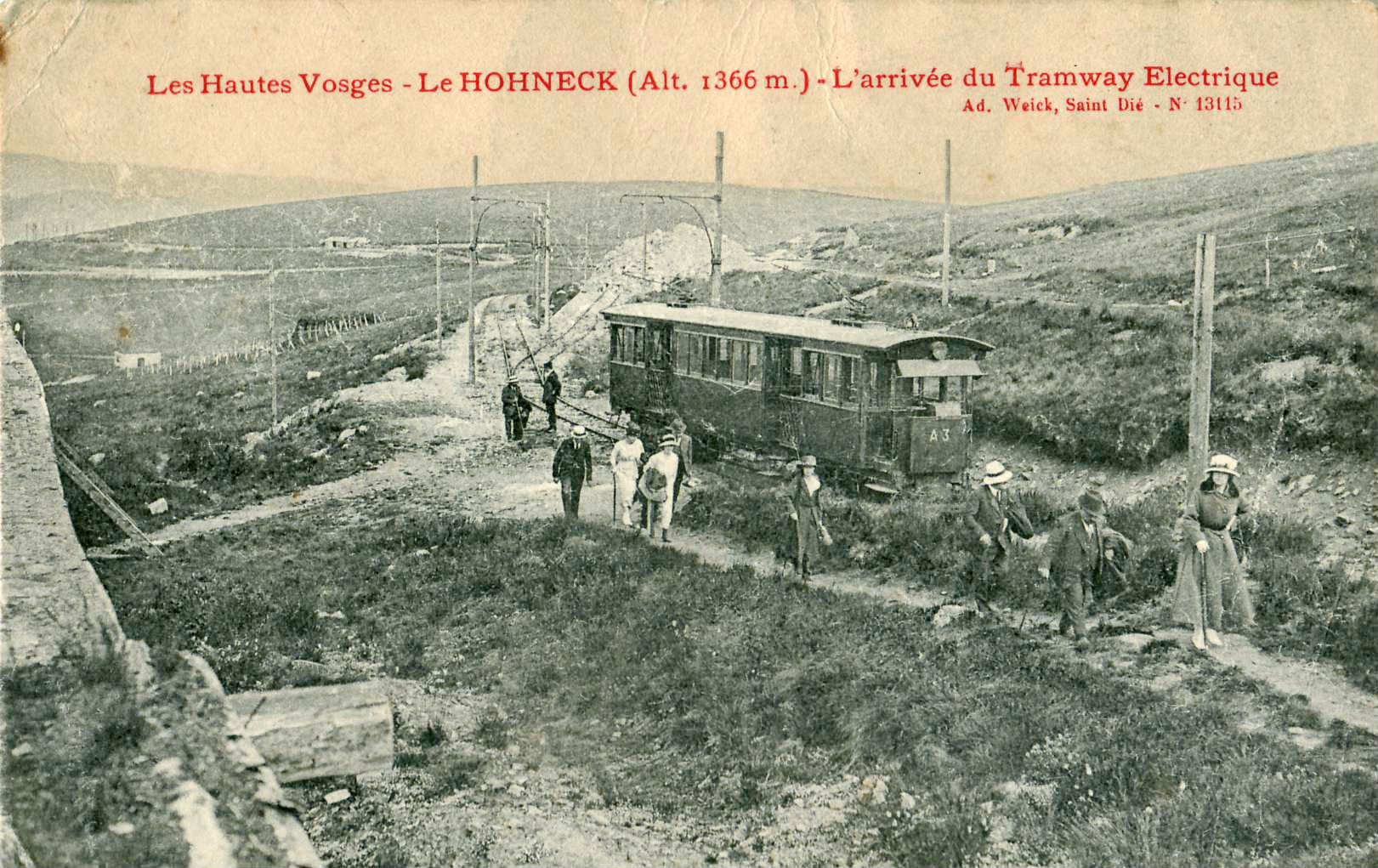
The Hohneck terminal of the Gérardmer tramway.

The Hohneck area dates back to the 19th century, the main connection route between Gérardmer and Munster, before the opening of the col de la Schlucht road. Therefore, ruins dating back to the Thirty Years' War and reused during Napoleon's military campaigns have been found not far from the summit.

A tramway line from Gérardmer to the Hohneck operated between July 25, 1897, and August 28, 1939. From the Alsace side of the mountain, a rack railway reached the Hohneck from Munster, passing through the col de la Schlucht between 1907 and 1914.

== Access to the summit ==
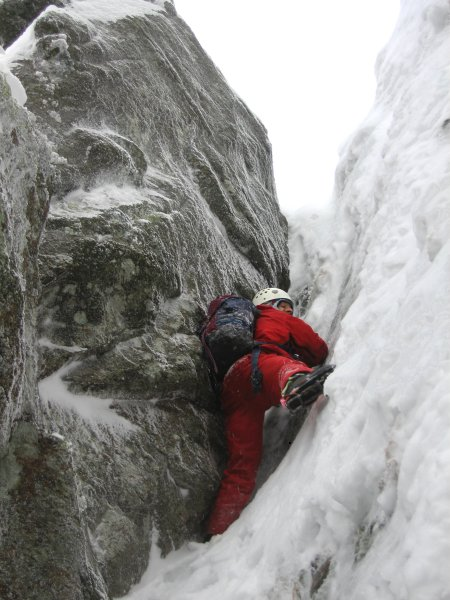
Winter mountaineering on the Hohneck North face

The well-known Route des Crêtes (French for road of the peaks) transits not far from the top of the mountain, which can be reached by car following a small asphalted branch.

== Bibliography ==
- Une Montagne vosgienne : le Hohneck, Guy-Jean Michel; Institut coopératif de l'École moderne, Imprimerie Merle et Cie, Grasse, 1963
- Guide du botaniste au Hohneck et aux environs de Géradmer, C. Brunotte and C. Lemasson, Coubé, 1921
- La Bresse-Le Hohneck, clins d'oeils sur l'histoire, Imprimerie Sailley, Le Thillot, 1995

== See also ==
- Haut de Falimont
- Grand Ballon
- Kastelberg
- Vosges Mountains
