= Saint-Amarin =

Commune in Grand Est, France

- Commune
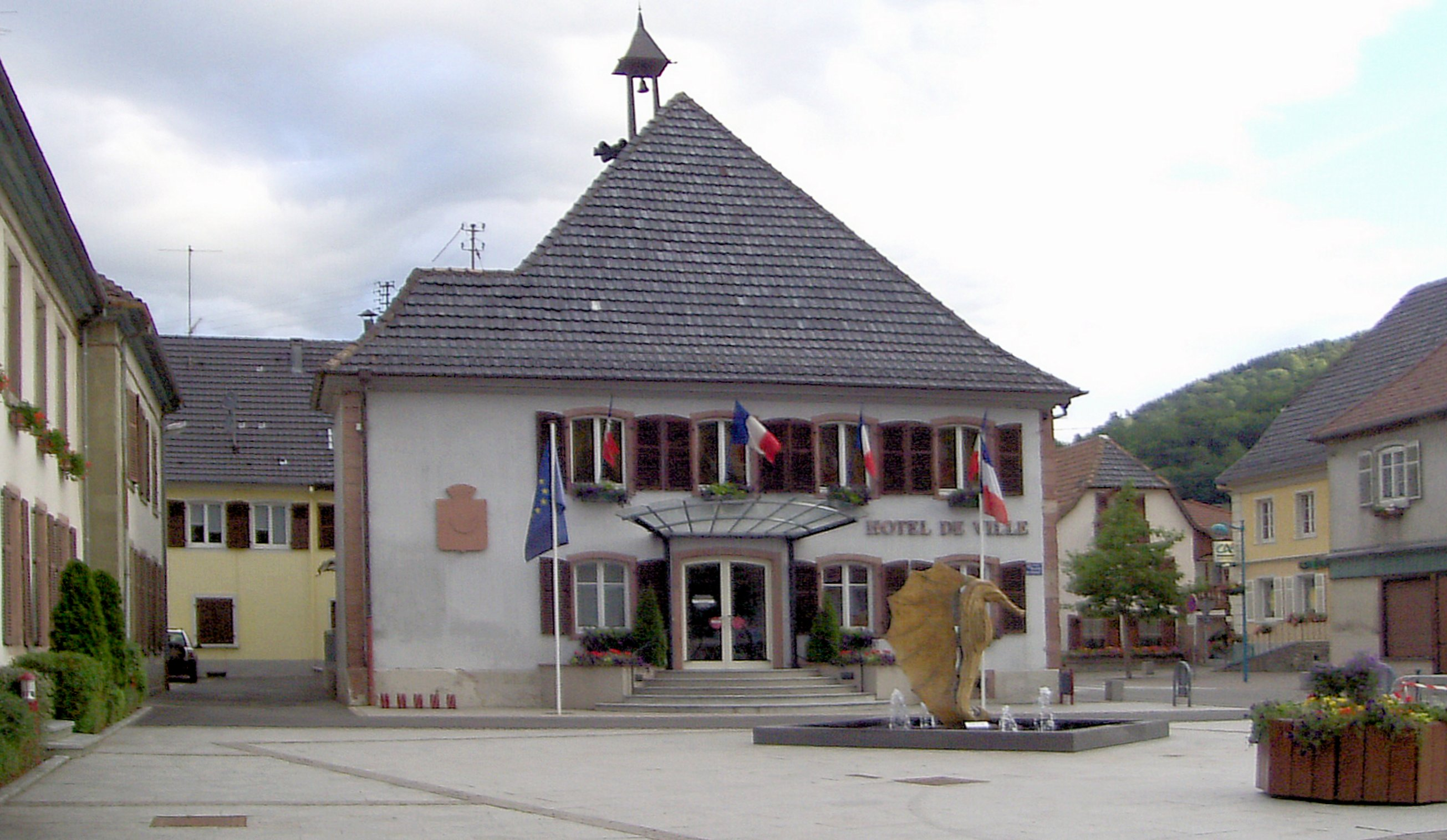
- The town hall in Saint-Amarin

- Coat of arms
- Location of Saint-Amarin
- Location within France Location within Grand Est
- Coordinates: 47°52′23″N 7°01′54″E
- Country: France
- Region: Grand Est
- Department: Haut-Rhin
- Arrondissement: Thann-Guebwiller
- Canton: Cernay
- Intercommunality: Vallée de Saint-Amarin

Government
  - Mayor (2020–2026): Charles Wehrlen
- Area^{1}: 11.61 km^{2} (4.48 sq mi)
- Elevation: 420 m (1,380 ft)
- Highest elevation: 1,347 m (4,419 ft)
- Lowest elevation: 393 m (1,289 ft)
- Population (2023): 2,173
  - Density: 187.2/km^{2} (484.8/sq mi)
- Time zone: UTC+01:00 (CET)
  - Summer (DST): UTC+02:00 (CEST)
- INSEE/Postal code: 68292 /68550
- ^{1} French Land Register data, which excludes lakes, ponds, glaciers > 1 km^{2} (0.386 sq mi or 247 acres) and river estuaries.

Saint-Amarin (French pronunciation: [sɛ̃.t‿amaʁɛ̃]; German: Sankt Amarin; Alsatian: Sàntàmàrì) is a commune in the Haut-Rhin department in Grand Est in north-eastern France.

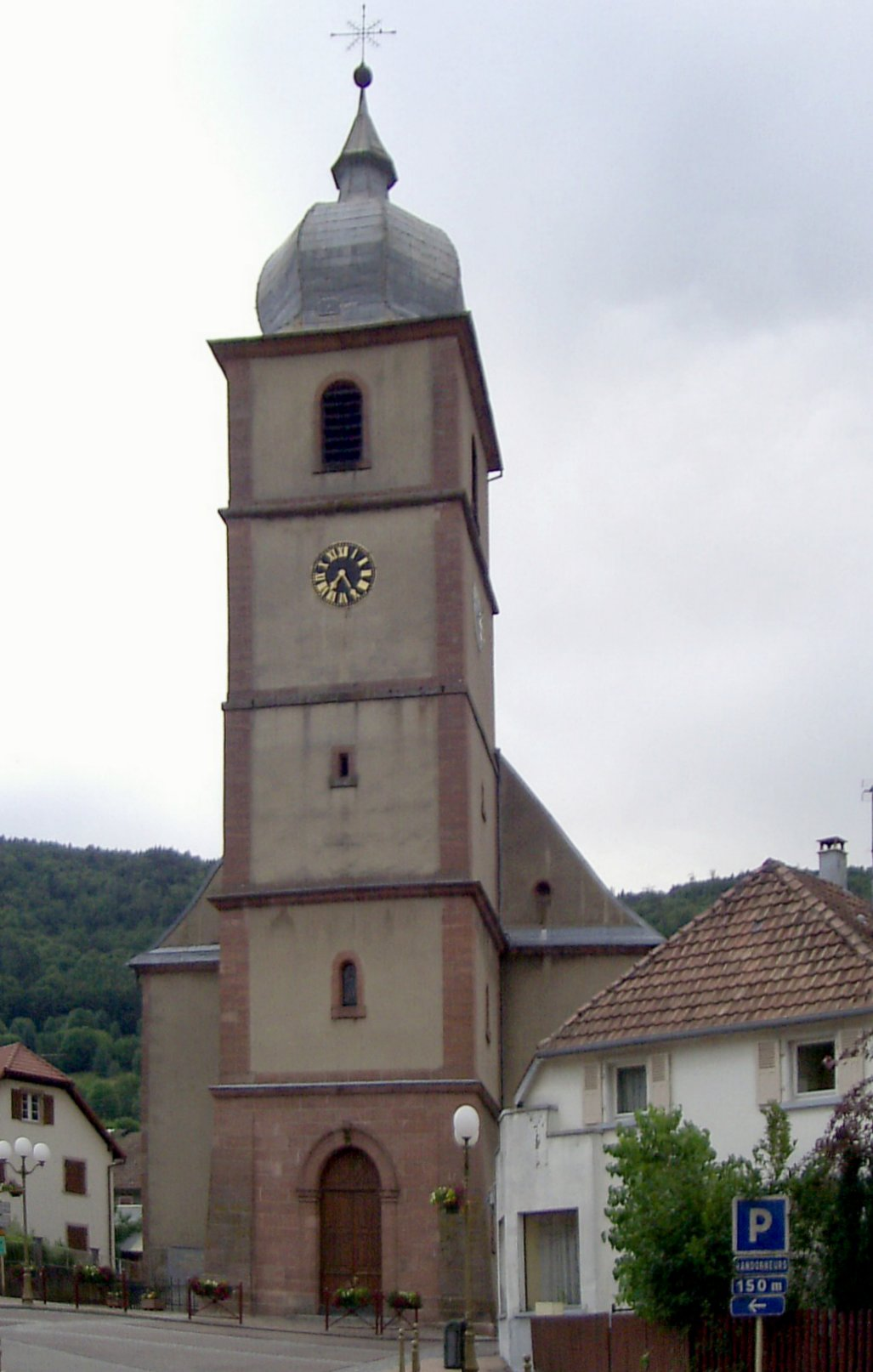
Church of Saint-Amarin

== Geography ==
Saint-Amarin lies in the valley of the river Thur, in the southern part of the Vosges Mountains. The highest point in its territory is the Storkenkopf (1366 m).

== Population ==
Historical population
Year	Pop.	±% p.a.
1968	2,013	—
1975	2,035	+0.16%
1982	2,305	+1.80%
1990	2,400	+0.51%
1999	2,440	+0.18%
2007	2,464	+0.12%
2012	2,338	−1.04%
2017	2,262	−0.66%
2023	2,173	−0.67%
Source: INSEE

== See also ==
- Communes of the Haut-Rhin department
