= Route des Crêtes =

Road in the Vosges Mountains in Eastern France

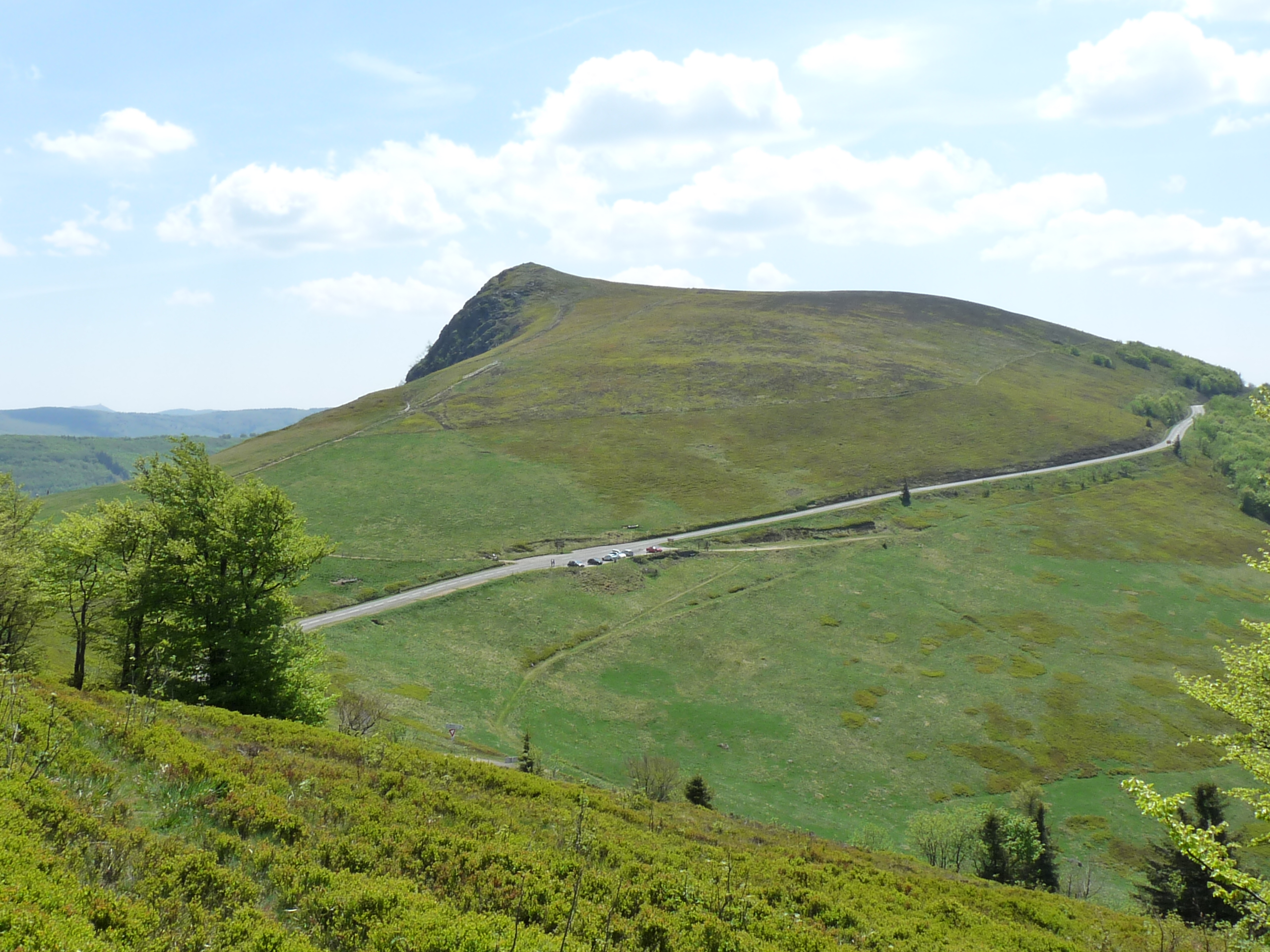
The Route des Crêtes near Rothenbachkopf

Thé Route des Crêtes (French pronunciation: [ʁut de kʁɛt]; English: Route of the Ridges) is an 89 km (55 mi) road in the Vosges Mountains in Eastern France, which passes through the Parc naturel régional des Ballons des Vosges. It connects Sainte-Marie-aux-Mines (north) with Cernay (south) and runs on the border of the departements of Haut-Rhin (68) and Vosges (88). Most of the route is at an elevation in excess of 950 m (3,117 ft), with the highest point being at the Col du Grand Ballon (1,343 m (4,406 ft)). The road is generally open from April to November, but most of the route is closed during the winter because of snow.

== History ==
The ridge forms part of the boundary between the Alsace and Lorraine regions of France. In 1871, Alsace was ceded to Germany under the Treaty of Frankfurt, and thus the ridge formed the boundary between France and Germany.

During the First World War, the French military decided to create a road to follow the ridge, thus allowing easier access to the valleys on both sides, enabling the faster movement of French troops. The route was mostly just below the ridge to the west and was thus protected from German gunfire.

== Route description ==
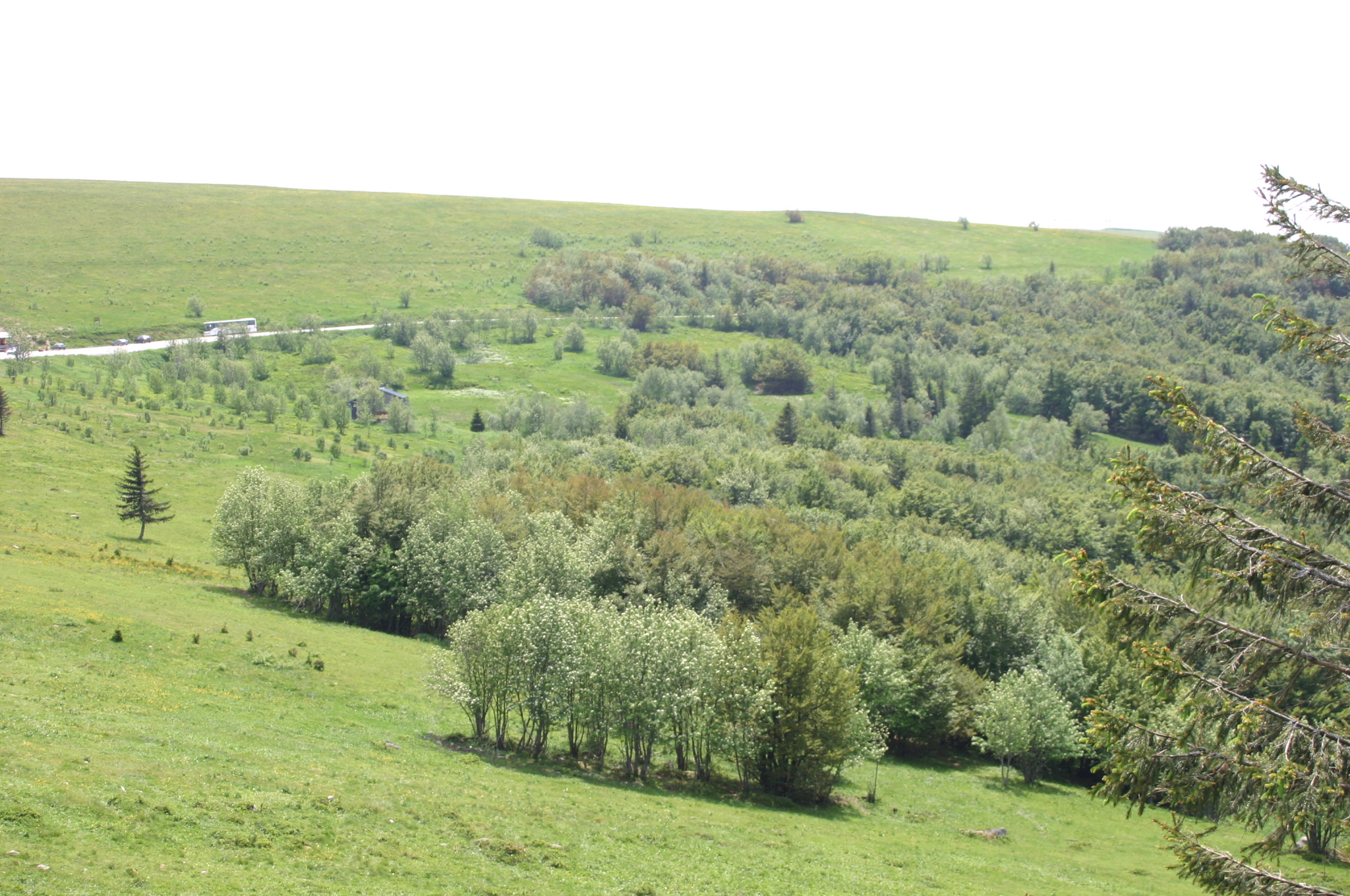
Route des Crêtes near Hohneck

From Sainte-Marie-aux-Mines (Haut-Rhin) (elevation 282 m (925 ft)), the Route des Crêtes is accessed via D48 and Col des Bagenelles (904 m (2,966 ft)), which leads to the Col du Bonhomme (949 m (3,114 ft)), on the route connecting Saint-Dié-des-Vosges (west) and Colmar (east).

The route (now D148) continues south via the Col du Louschbach (978 m (3,209 ft)) to the Col du Calvaire (1,134 m (3,720 ft)), where it enters the department of Vosges. The route (now D61) then passes the Gazon du Faing (1,303 m (4,275 ft)) from where there is a panoramic view stretching to the Black Forest across the Rhine valley in Germany and the Hohneck, Petit Ballon and Grand Ballon summits in the Vosges mountains.

From here the road then crosses the Col de la Schlucht (1,139 m (3,737 ft)), which connects Gérardmer (west) with Colmar. Near here, there is the Jardin d'altitude du Haut Chitelet. Now the D430, the road then passes the Hohneck mountain (1,362 m (4,469 ft)) from where there are also panoramic views.

After passing the Kastelberg (1,350 m (4,429 ft)), Rainkopf (1,305 m (4,281 ft)) and Rothenbachkopf (1,316 m (4,318 ft)) peaks in quick succession, the road returns to the Haut-Rhin department before it crosses the Cols du Herrenberg (1,186 m (3,891 ft)) and Hahnenbrunnen (1,180 m (3,871 ft)) on the way to the winter resort of Le Markstein (1,266 m (4,154 ft)).

The road (now D431) then reaches its highest point at the Col du Grand Ballon (1,343 m (4,406 ft)), before passing the Col Amic (828 m (2,717 ft)) on the descent to Cernay. En route, it passes the ruins of Freundstein Chateau, which at an altitude of 984 m (3,228 ft) is the highest castle in Alsace, and the Hartmannswillerkopf military cemetery at Vieil Armand.

== Traffic management ==
The route is popular amongst pedestrians, cyclists, motor cyclists, cars and mobilhomes. In 2000, a shuttle bus was introduced to carry pedestrians onto the ridge road in an attempt to reduce the pressure from the use of cars; this was not successful and the bus service was withdrawn in 2012. In 2008, a comprehensive report on the traffic problems was published by the park authority. Environmental groups were calling for partial closure of the road to prevent over-crowding especially during summer weekends, which often resulted in road accidents. The report's author, J.-P. Monet considered the conflicting environmental and economic issues. His report offered no real solutions but concluded:

Je souhaite aux acteurs . . . de trouver le chemin de la concertation et d’arriver à créer un réseau coopératif leur permettant de valoriser ce magnifique site dans un climat apaisé. (I hope the players can find the path of dialogue and create a cooperative network allowing them to develop this wonderful site in a peaceful climate.)

With effect from 1 May 2012, a speed limit of 70 km/h was introduced on the sections of the road in the Haut-Rhin department, between the Col des Bagenelles and Uffholtz (near Cernay). A similar speed limit has not been imposed by the Vosges department covering the central section of the route. A proposal has also been put forward to close the road entirely to motor vehicles, other than public transport, on at least one day a week.
