= Lac de la Lauch =

Reservoir in France

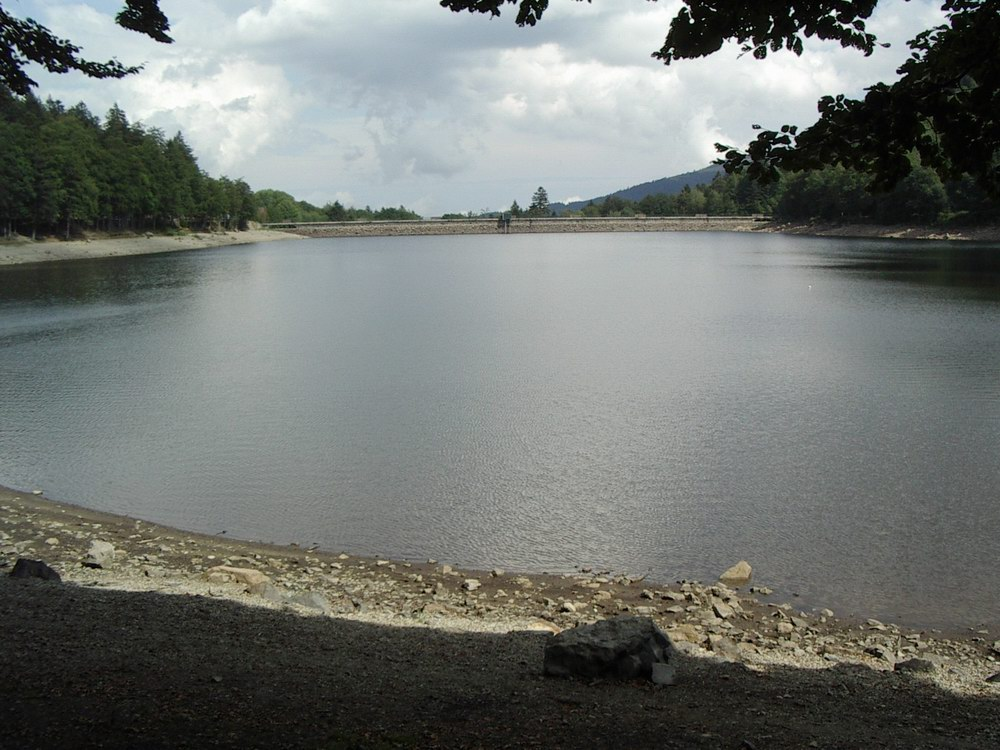

- Location within France
- Location: Haut-Rhin
- Coordinates: 47°56′8″N 7°2′35″E
- Type: artificial
- Primary outflows: Lauch
- Basin countries: France
- Surface area: 0.11 km^{2} (0.042 sq mi)
- Max. depth: 19 m (62 ft)
- Surface elevation: 923 m (3,028 ft)

Lac de la Lauch is a lake in Haut-Rhin, France. At an elevation of 923 m (3,028 ft), its surface area is 0.11 km^{2} (0.042 sq mi).

It is an artificial lake located on the Alsatian side of the Vosges, at the bottom of the upper Lauch Valley. It is situated within a vast natural amphitheater formed between the heights of Klintzkopf to the northeast and those of Markstein to the south. This area includes the Oberlauchen Pass, the Lauchenkopf and Breitfirst to the north, the Steinlebach pastures to the west, and the Trehkopf and Jungfrauenkopf overlooking the former pastures of Markstein and the Markstein Pass to the southeast.
