= Grand Ballon =

Mountain in France

- Great Belchen
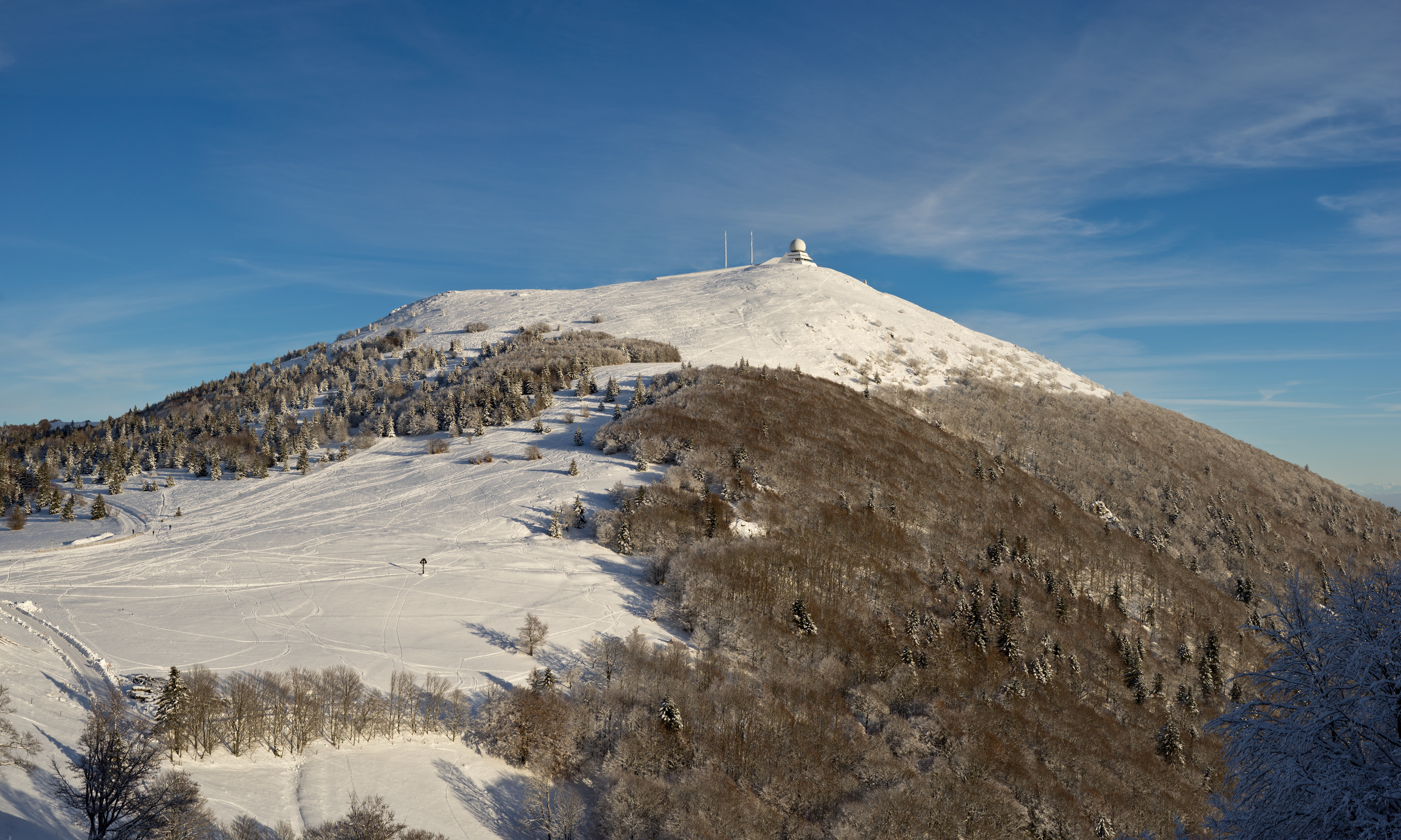
- The Grand Ballon from the west

Highest point
- Elevation: 1,423 m (4,669 ft)
- Prominence: 1,081 m (3,547 ft)
- Parent peak: Chasseral (line parent)
- Isolation: 67.3 km (41.8 mi) to Feldberg
- Listing: Ribu
- Coordinates: 47°54′03″N 7°05′53″E

Naming
- Native name: Großer Belchen (German); Grosser Belchen (Alemannic German)
- English translation: Great mountain

Geography
- Location within France
- Location: Haut-Rhin, Grand-Est, France
- Parent range: Vosges Mountains

Climbing
- First ascent: unknown

The Grand Ballon (French pronunciation: [ɡʁɑ̃ balɔ̃]) or Great Belchen (German: Großer Belchen [ˌɡʁoːsɐ ˈbɛlçn̩]; Alsatian: Grosser Belchen) is the highest mountain in the Vosges, located 25 kilometres (16 mi) northwest of Mulhouse, France. It is also the highest point of the Grand-Est French region.

== Name ==
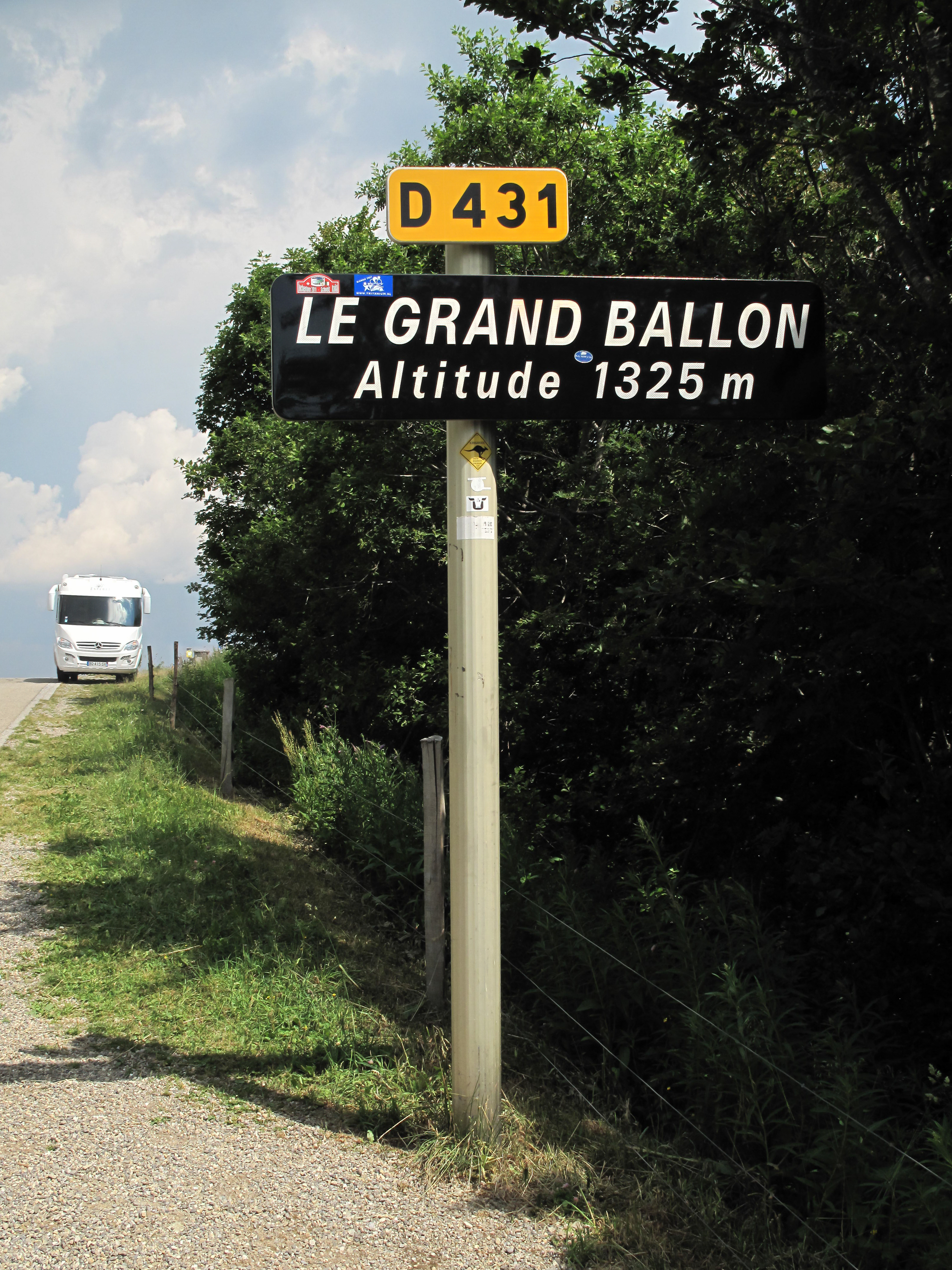
Grand Ballon, name sign

Grand Ballon means "great [round-topped] mountain" because a ballon in French is a geographical term for a mountain with a rounded summit, similar to the German Kuppe.

Some still call it Ballon de Guebwiller, after the name of the closest town, Guebwiller, located 8 km (5 mi) to the east. It is 1,423.7 metres (4,671 ft) high.

== Climate ==
According to the Köppen climate classification, the top of the Grand Ballon features a subalpine climate (Köppen: Dfc) due to its high altitude comparable to the Alps or the Pyrenees. Along with the Hohneck the summit of the Grand Ballon is the coldest and windiest point in Alsace. A record low of −30.2 °C (−22.4 °F) was recorded on 10 February 1956, a record high of 29 °C (84 °F) was recorded on 13 August 2003. The temperature difference between the Grand Ballon and the neighboring plain (Mulhouse area) usually ranges from 7 to 10 °C (13 to 18 °F) and is higher in summertime. Winter snow cover is usually more than 1.5 m (5 ft) above 1,350 m (4,430 ft) of altitude. The highest snow accumulation ever recorded was 3.7 m (12 ft) on 7 March 2006; in 1969 and 1970 the snow cover was above 3 m (10 ft).

== Trails ==
The well known Route des Crêtes (French for "route of the peaks") circumvents the mountain top around east, crossing a mountain pass at an altitude of 1,343 m (4,406 ft), between Le Markstein winter sports station and Hartmannswillerkopf, a rocky spur.

== Tour de France ==
The road over the pass to the north of the mountain is occasionally used in the Tour de France, the first crossing being in 1969. It is the only Hors catégorie (beyond categorization) climb in northern France.

== Belchen system ==
The mountain is part of the so-called Belchen system, a group of mountains with the name "Belchen" (in German) that may have been part of a Celtic sun calendar.

== World War I monument ==
Near the radar station or air traffic control centre, there are two First World War (1914–1918) memorials called, Memorial Diables Bleus Grand Ballon, commemorating the French troops, in particular the Chasseurs Alpins, whose nickname is Les Diables Bleus (Eng: The Blue Devils), who fought there in World War I. The original single monument was erected in 1927 but was dynamited, by German troops, in July 1940 during World War II and rebuilt in 1960.

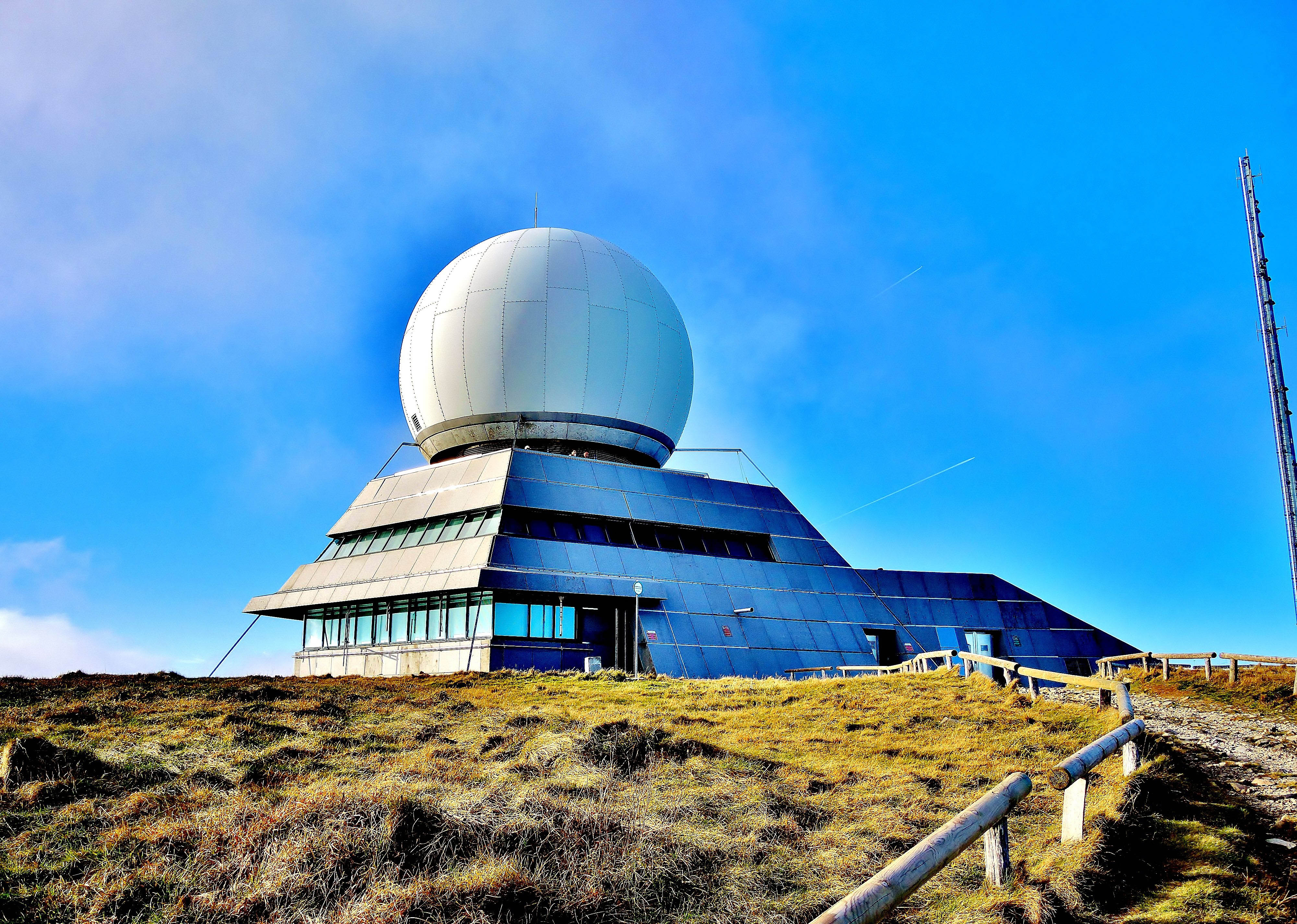
An air traffic control radar station is located on the summit.

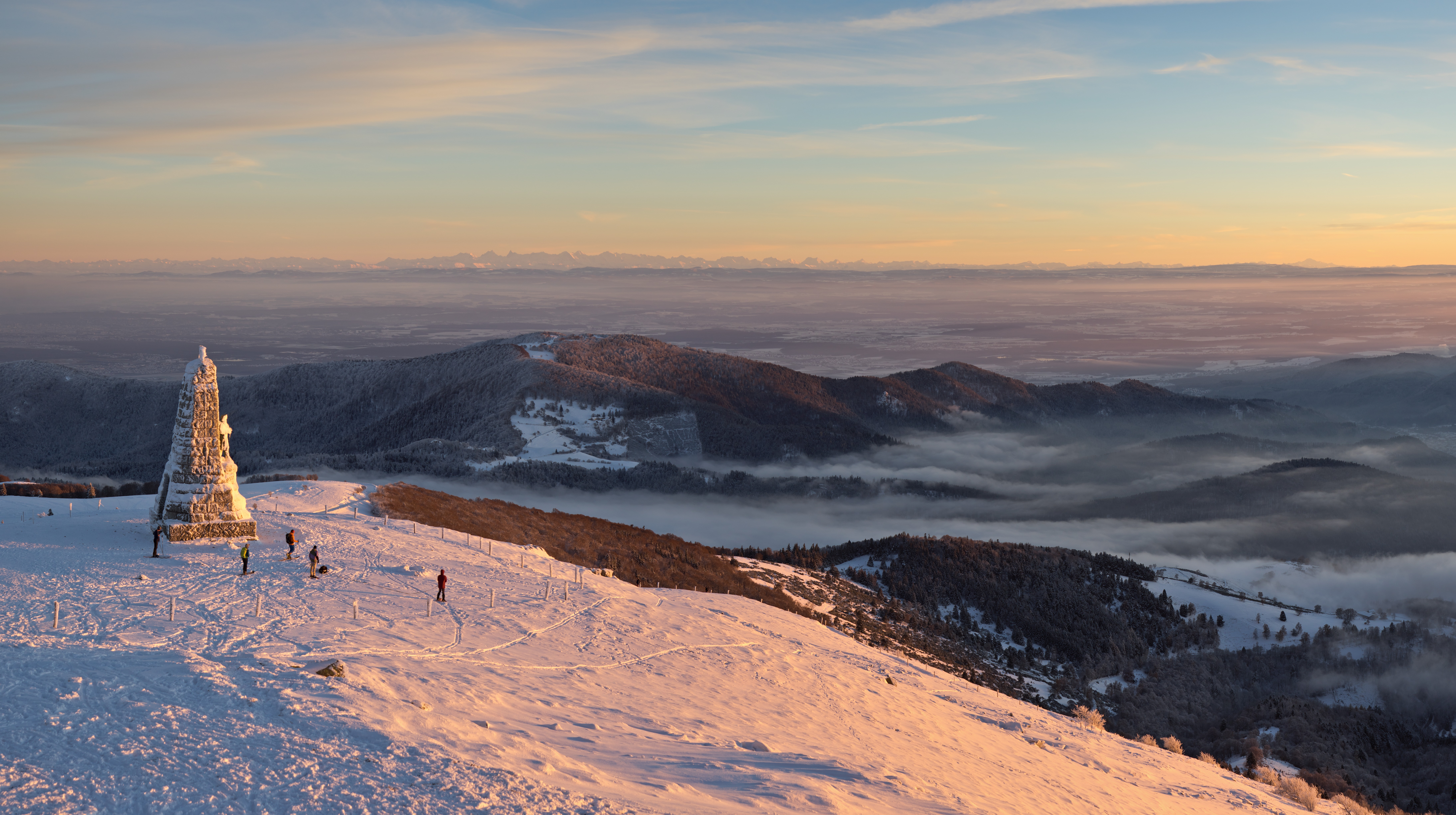
View from the Grand Ballon to the Swiss Alps. In the foreground the Memorial Diables Bleus

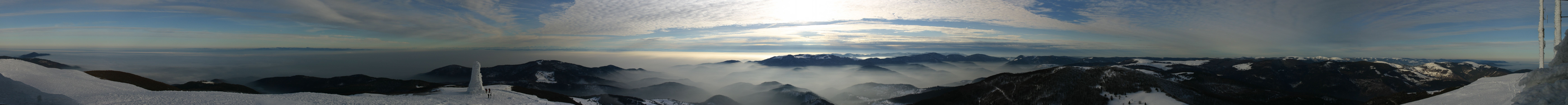
360° panorama from the summit - 7 January 2006

== See also ==
- Ballon d'Alsace
