= Rainkopf =

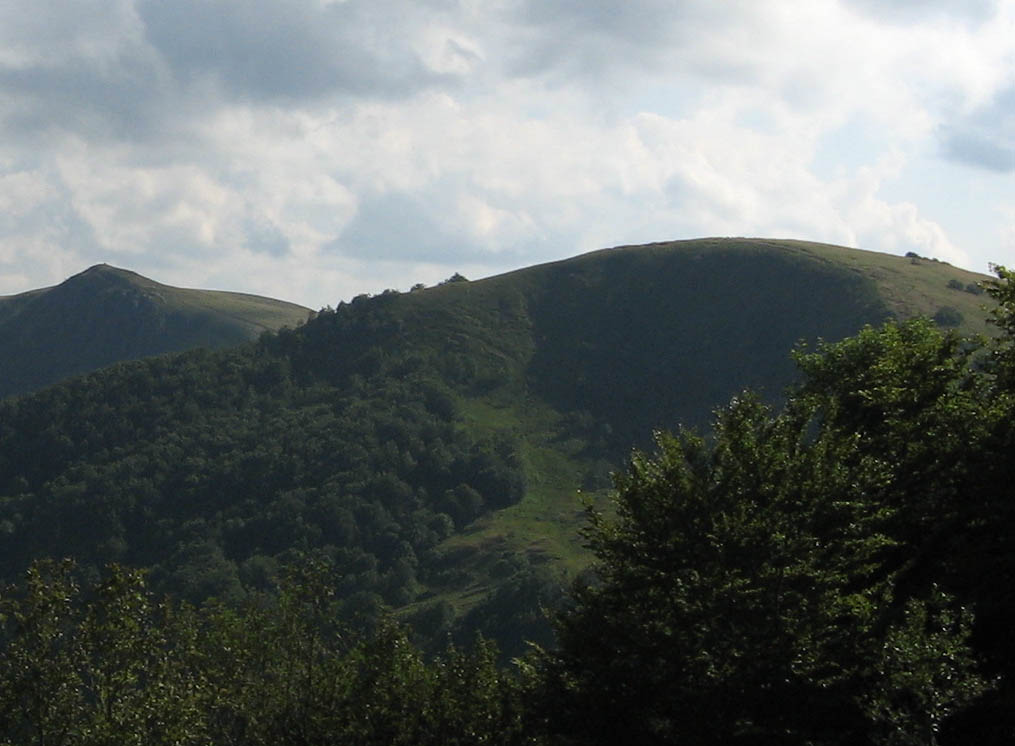
- Rainkopf east slopes

Highest point
- Elevation: 1,305 m (4,281 ft)
- Coordinates: 48°00′35″N 6°58′58″E

Geography
- Location within France
- Location: Alsace / Lorraine, France
- Parent range: Vosges Mountains

The Rainkopf is one of the highest summits of the Vosges Mountains. It is located on the border between the French regions of Alsace and Lorraine. Not faraway from its summit is located a mountain hut called Refuge "Louis Hergès" au Rainkopf

== Etymology ==
In German Rainkopf means ravine mountain.

== Geography ==
The mountain is divided between the French municipalities of La Bresse (dep. of Vosges, Lorraine), Mittlach and Wildenstein (dep. of Haut-Rhin, Alsace).

The well known Route des Crêtes (French for road of the peaks) transits not faraway from the top of the mountain, which can be reached by a footpath signposted by the Vosges Club.

== See also ==
- Vosges Mountains
