= Vosges =

Mountain range in France

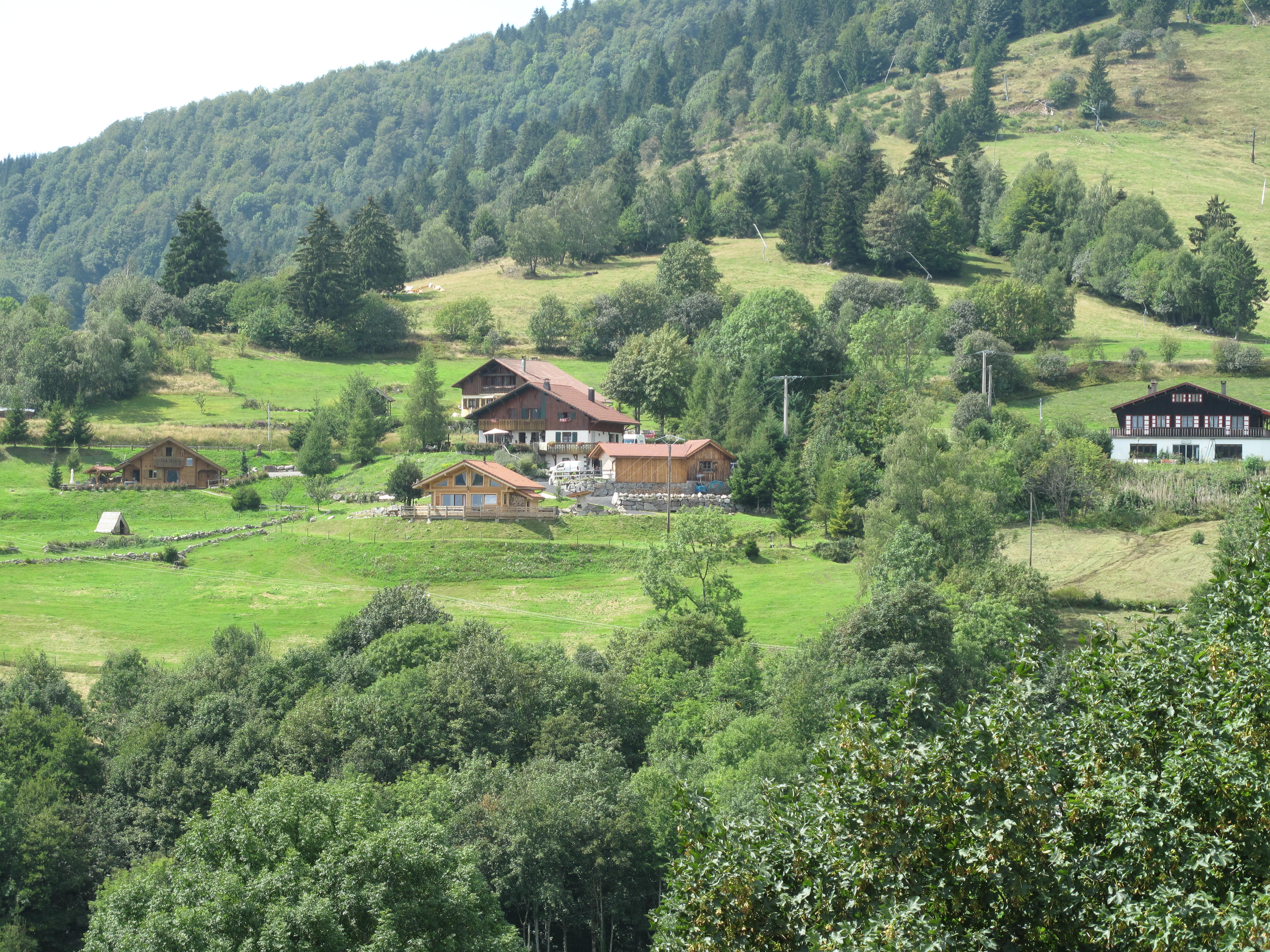
- Houses on the slopes near Bussang

Highest point
- Peak: Grand Ballon
- Elevation: 1,424 m (4,672 ft)

Dimensions
- Length: 120 km (75 mi)
- Area: 5,500 km^{2} (2,100 mi^{2}) up to 6,000 km^{2} (2,300 sq mi) depending on the natural region boundaries selected

Naming
- Native name: Vogesen (German); Vogese (Alemannic German)

Geography
- Location within France

- Map of the Vosges mountains
- Country: France
- Region: Grand Est, Bourgogne-Franche-Comté
- Range coordinates: 48°N 7°E

Geology
- Orogeny: Medium mountain range
- Rock age(s): Gneiss, granite and vulcanite stratigraphic units: about 419–252 mya Bunter sandstone stratigraphic unit: 252–243 mya
- Rock type(s): Gneiss, granite, vulcanite, sandstone

The Vosges (/voʊʒ/ VOHZH, French: [voʒ]; German: Vogesen [voˈɡeːzn̩]; Franconian and Alemannic German: Vogese) are a range of medium mountains in Eastern France, near its border with Germany. Together with the Palatine Forest to the north on the German side of the border, they form a single geomorphological unit and low mountain range of around 8,000 km^{2} (3,100 sq mi) in area. It runs in a north-northeast direction from the Burgundian Gate (the Belfort–Ronchamp–Lure line) to the Börrstadt Basin (the Winnweiler–Börrstadt–Göllheim line), and forms the western boundary of the Upper Rhine Plain.

The Grand Ballon is the highest peak at 1,424 m (4,672 ft), followed by the Storkenkopf (1,366 m, 4,482 ft), and the Hohneck (1,364 m, 4,475 ft).

== Geography ==
Geographically, the Vosges Mountains are wholly in France, far above the Col de Saverne separating them from the Palatinate Forest in Germany. The latter area logically continues the same Vosges geologic structure but traditionally receives this different name for historical and political reasons. From 1871 to 1918 the Vosges marked for the most part the border between Germany and France, due to the Franco-Prussian War. The elongated massif is divided south to north into three sections:

- The Higher Vosges or High Vosges (Hautes Vosges), extending in the southern part of the range from Belfort to the river valley of the Bruche. The rounded summits of the Hautes Vosges are called ballons in French, literally "balloons".
- The sandstone Vosges or Middle Vosges (50 km, 31 mi), between the Permian Basin of Saint-Die including the Devonian-Dinantian volcanic massif of Schirmeck-Moyenmoutier and the Col de Saverne
- The Lower Vosges or Low Vosges (48 km, 30 mi), commonly known as North Vosges, a sandstone plateau ranging from 300 metres (1,000 ft) to 560 metres (1,850 ft) high, between the Col de Saverne and the source of the Lauter.

In addition, the term "Central Vosges" is used to designate the various lines of summits, especially those above 1,000 m (3,300 ft) in elevation. The French department of Vosges is named after the range.

=== Geology ===
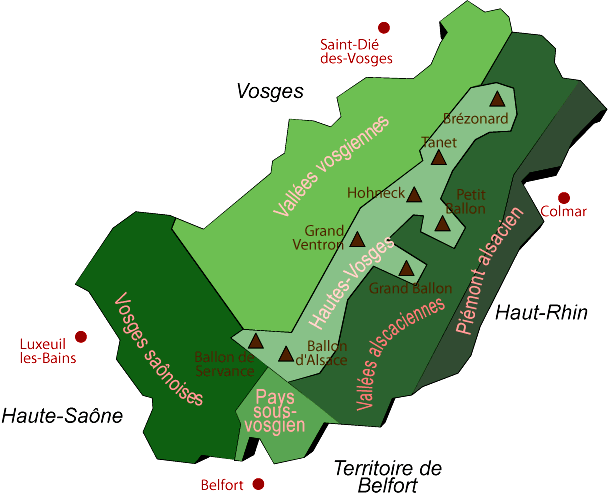
Upper Vosges Mountains map

From a geological point of view, a graben at the beginning of the Paleogene period caused the formation of Alsace and the uplift of the bedrock plates of the Vosges, in eastern France, and those in the Black Forest, in Germany. From a scientific view, the Vosges Mountains are not mountains as such, but rather the western edge of the unfinished Alsatian graben, stretching continuously as part of the larger Tertiary formations. Erosive glacial action was the primary catalyst for development of the highland massif feature.

The Vosges in their southern and central parts are called the Hautes Vosges. These consist of a large Carboniferous mountain eroded just before the Permian period with gneiss, granites, porphyritic masses or other volcanic intrusions. The north, south and west parts are less eroded by glaciers, and here Vosges Triassic and Permian red sandstone remains are found in large beds. The grès vosgien (a French name for a Triassic rose sandstone) are embedded sometimes up to more than 500 m (1,600 ft) in thickness. The Lower Vosges in the north are dislocated plates of various sandstones, ranging from 300 to 600 m (1,000 to 2,000 ft) high.

The Vosges are very similar to the corresponding range of the Black Forest across the Rhine since both lie within the same degrees of latitude, have similar geological formations and are characterised by forests on their lower slopes, above which are open pastures and rounded summits of a rather uniform altitude. Both areas exhibit steeper slopes towards the Rhine and a more gradual descent on the other side. Both the Vosges and the Black Forest were formed by isostatic uplift in response to the opening of the Rhine Graben, a major extensional basin. When such basins form, the thinning of the crust causes uplift immediately adjacent to the basin, decreasing with distance from the basin. Thus, the highest range of peaks rises immediately adjacent to the basin and increasingly lower mountains rise further from the basin.

=== Mountains ===
The highest points are in the Hautes Vosges: the Grand Ballon, in ancient times called Ballon de Guebwiller or Ballon de Murbach, rises to 1,424 m (4,672 ft); the Storckenkopf to 1,366 m (4,482 ft); the Hohneck to 1,364 m (4,475 ft); the Kastelberg to 1,350 m (4,429 ft); and the Ballon d'Alsace to 1,247 m (4,091 ft). The Col de Saales, between the Higher and Central Vosges, reaches nearly 579 m (1,900 ft), both lower and narrower than the Higher Vosges, with Mont Donon at 1,008 m (3,307 ft) being the highest point of this Nordic section.

The highest mountains and peaks of the Vosges (with Alsatian or German names in brackets) are:

- Grand Ballon (Großer Belchen) 1,424 m (4,672 ft)
- Storkenkopf 1,366 m (4,482 ft)
- Hohneck 1,363 m (4,472 ft)
- Kastelberg 1,350 m (4,429 ft)
- Klintzkopf (Klinzkopf) 1,330 m (4,364 ft)
- Rothenbachkopf 1,316 m (4,318 ft)
- Lauchenkopf 1,314 m (4,311 ft)
- Batteriekopf 1,311 m (4,301 ft)
- Haut de Falimont 1,306 m (4,285 ft)
- Gazon du Faing 1,306 m (4,285 ft)
- Rainkopf 1,305 m (4,281 ft)
- Gazon de Faîte 1,303 m (4,275 ft)
- Ringbuhl (Ringbühl) 1,302 m (4,272 ft)
- Soultzereneck (Sulzereneck) 1,302 m (4,272 ft)
- Le Tanet (Tanneck) 1,292 m (4,239 ft)
- Petit Ballon (Kahler Wasen or Kleiner Belchen) 1,272 m (4,173 ft)
- Ballon d'Alsace (Elsässer Belchen) 1,247 m (4,091 ft)
- Brézouard 1,229 m (4,032 ft)
- Ballon de Servance (highest point in the département of Haute-Saône) 1,216 m (3,990 ft)
- Drumont 1,200 m (3,937 ft)
- Rossberg 1,191 m (3,907 ft)
- Planche des Belles Filles 1,148 m (3,766 ft)
- Molkenrain 1,123 m (3,684 ft)
- Champ du Feu (Hochfeld or Firstfeld) 1,098 m (3,602 ft)
- Baerenkopf 1,074 m (3,524 ft)
- Rocher de Mutzig (Mutzigfelsen) 1,008 m (3,307 ft)
- Donon 1,008 m (3,307 ft)
- Taennchel (Tännchel) 992 m (3,255 ft)
- Climont 965 m (3,166 ft)
- Hartmannswillerkopf (Hartmannsweilerkopf) 956 m (3,136 ft)
- Ungersberg 901 m (2,956 ft)
- Tête du Coquin 837 m (2,746 ft)
- Mont Sainte-Odile (Odilienberg) 764 m (2,507 ft)
- Rocher de Dabo 650 m (2,130 ft)
- Grand Wintersberg (Großer Wintersberg) 581 m (1,906 ft)
- Hohenbourg (Hohenburg) 550 m (1,804 ft)
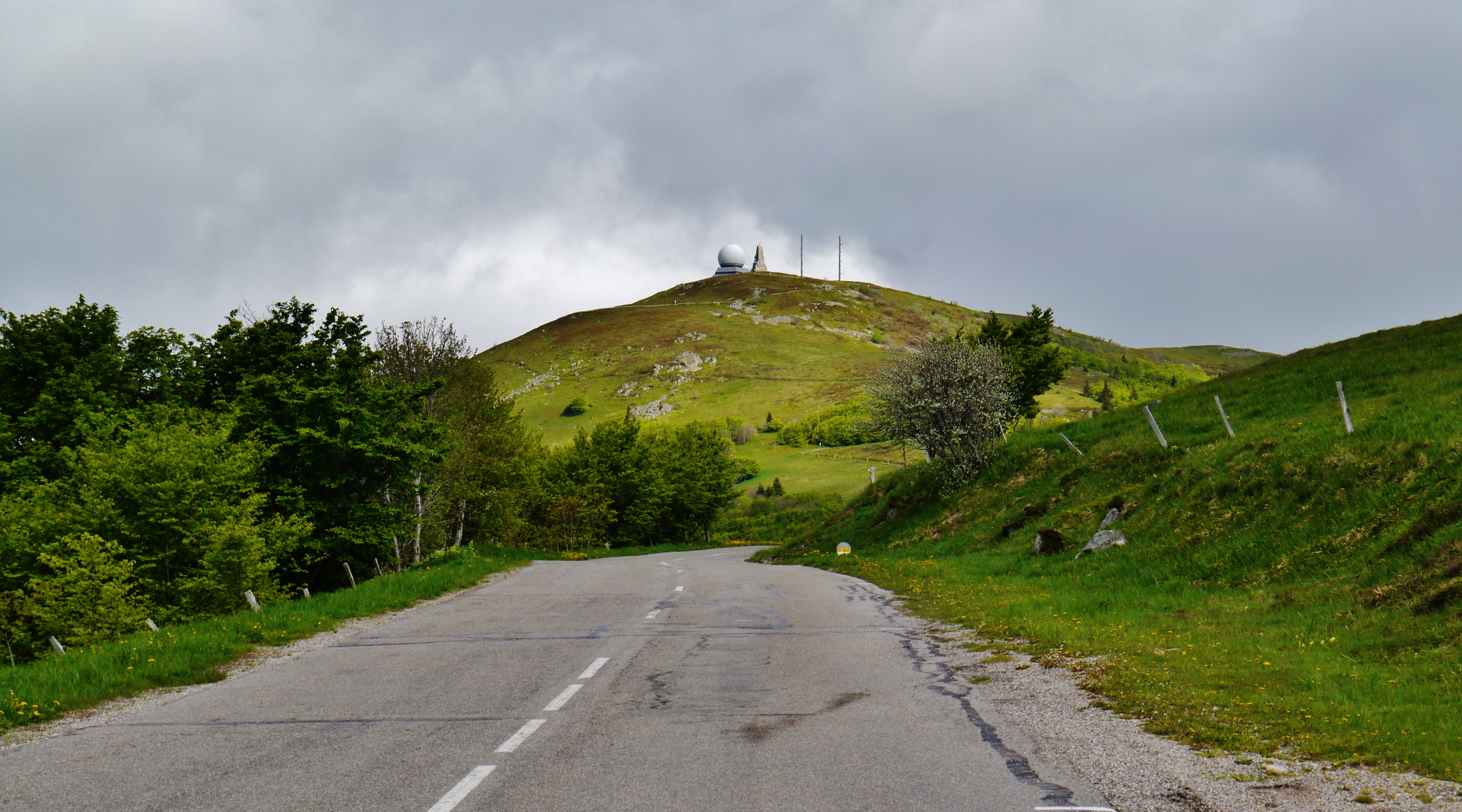
Grand Ballon

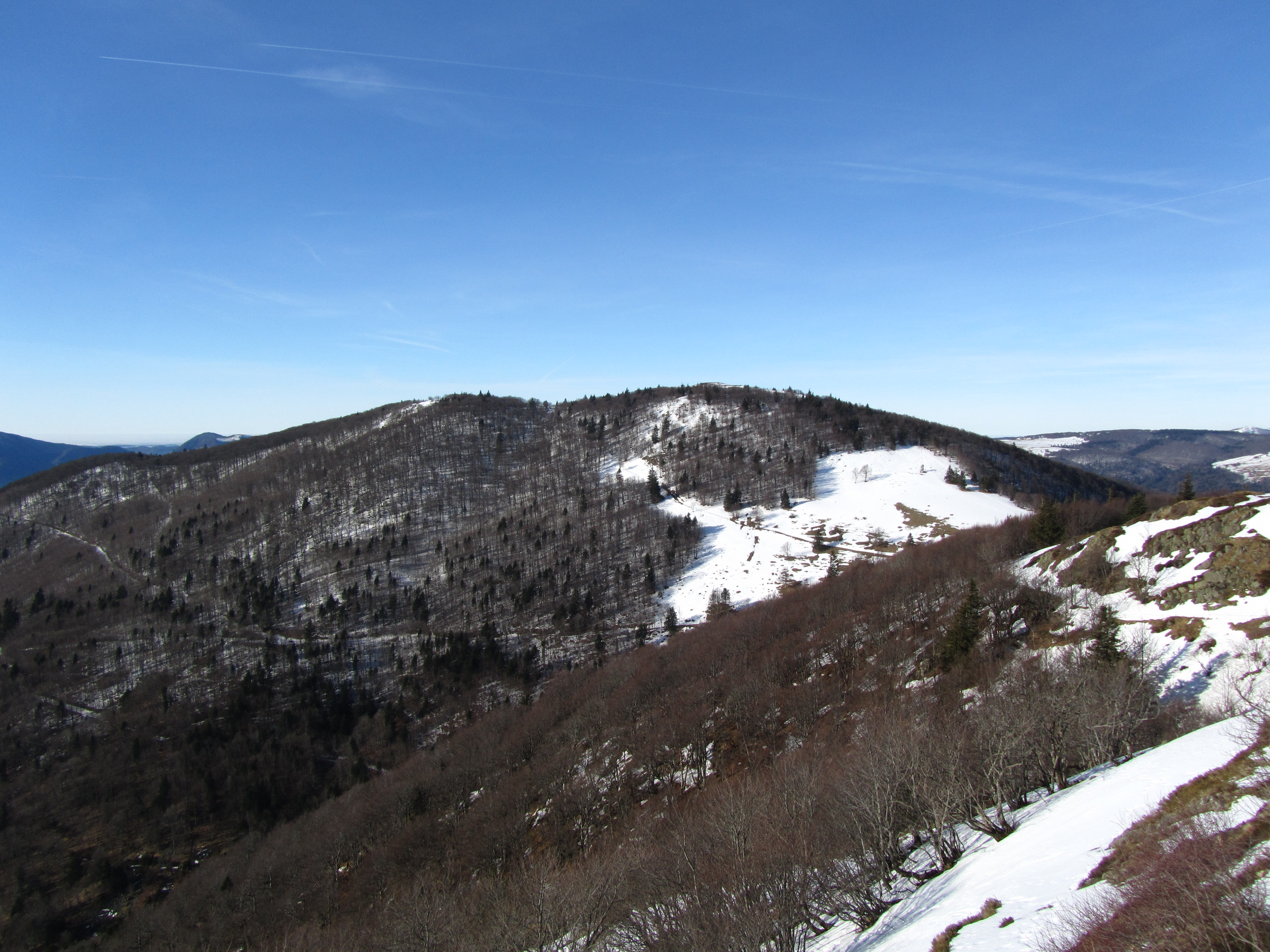
Storkenkopf

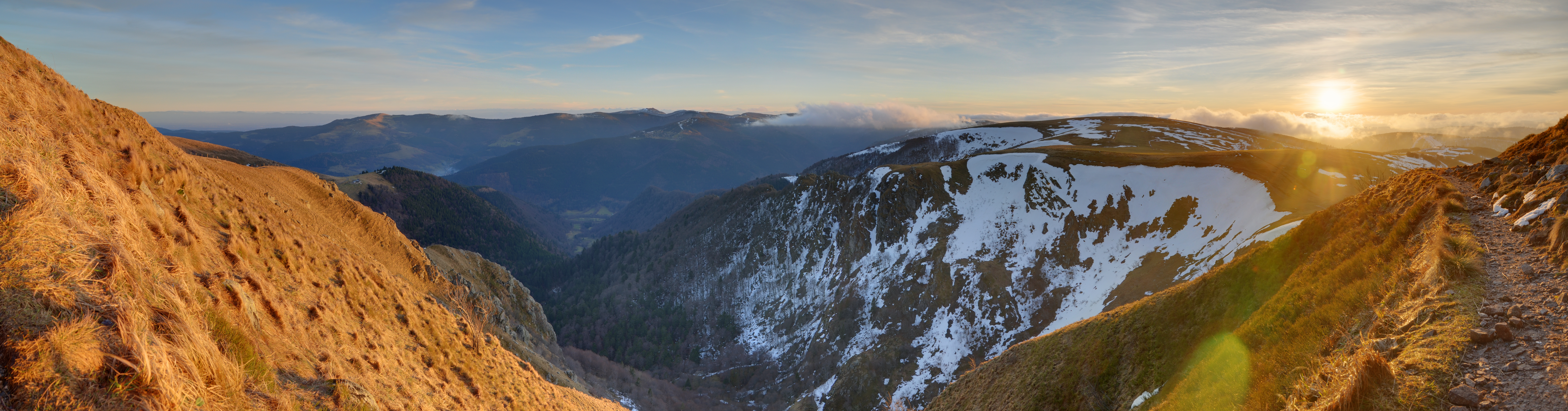
Hohneck

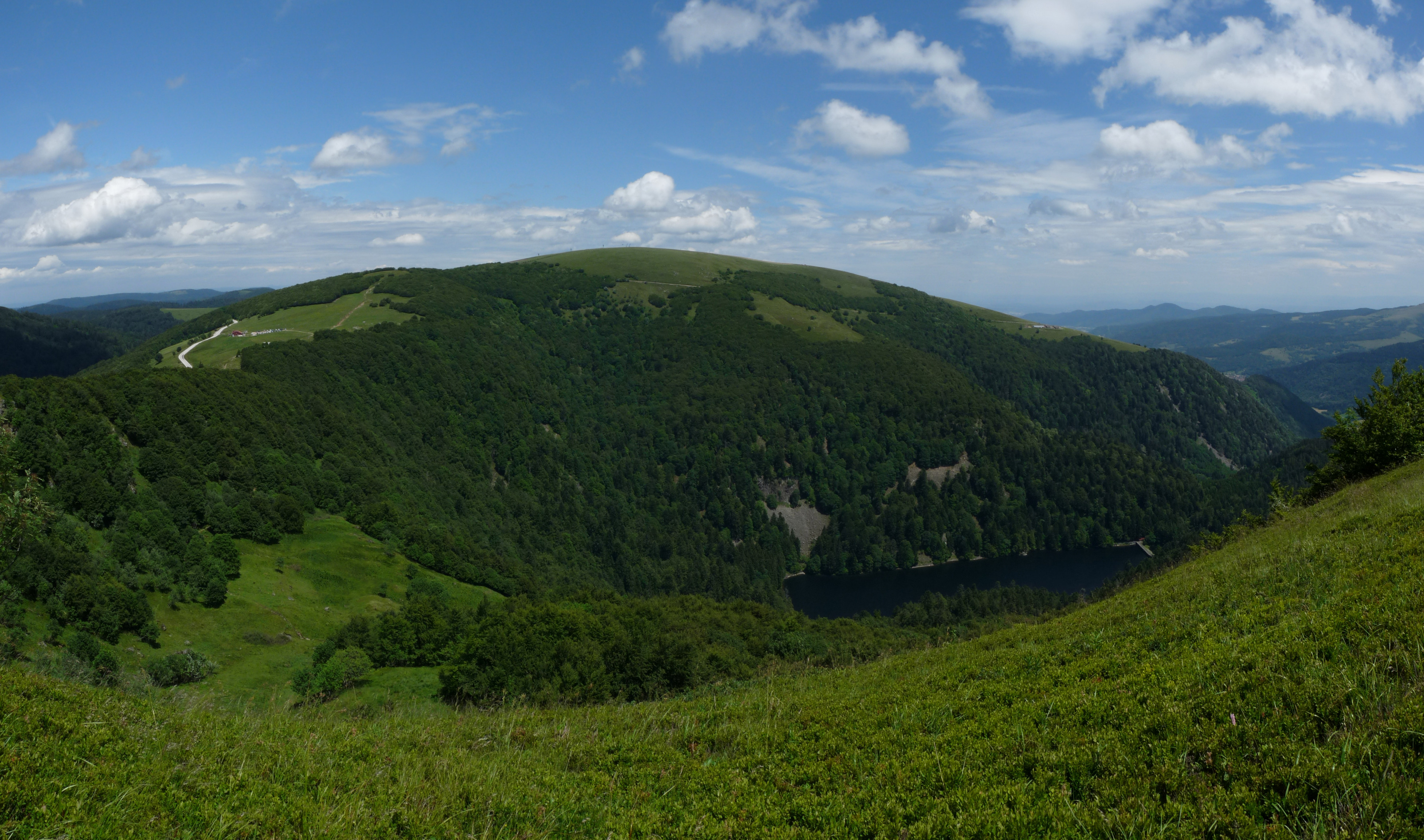
Kastelberg

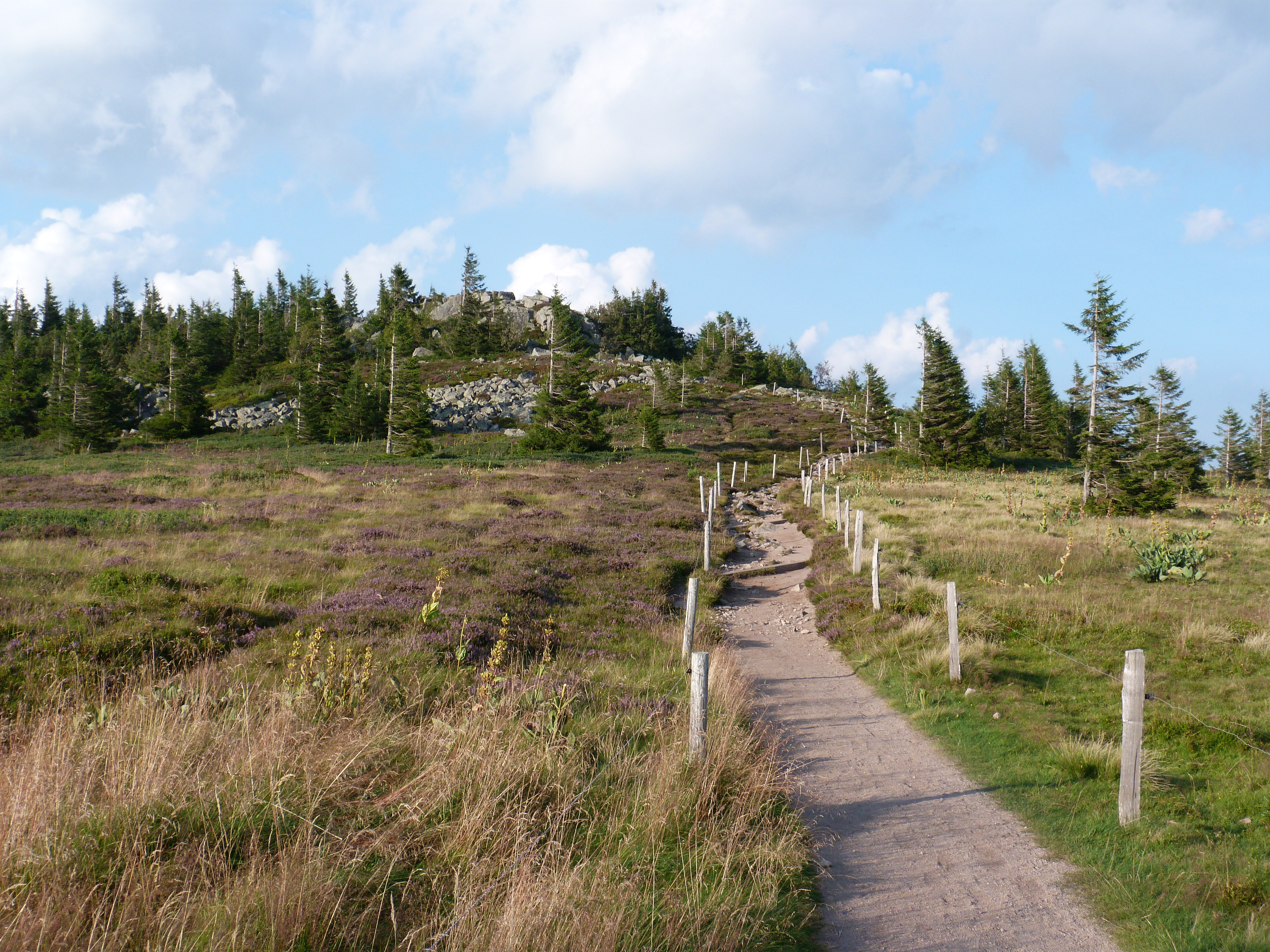
Le Tanet

=== Nature parks and protected areas ===
Two nature parks lie within the Vosges: the Ballons des Vosges Nature Park and the Northern Vosges Regional Nature Park. The Northern Vosges Nature Park and the Palatinate Forest Nature Park on the German side of the border form the cross-border UNESCO-designated Palatinate Forest-North Vosges Biosphere Reserve.

In the late 20th century, a wide area of the massif was included in two protected areas, the Parc naturel régional des Vosges du Nord (established in 1976) and the Parc naturel régional des Ballons des Vosges (established in 1989).

== Climate ==
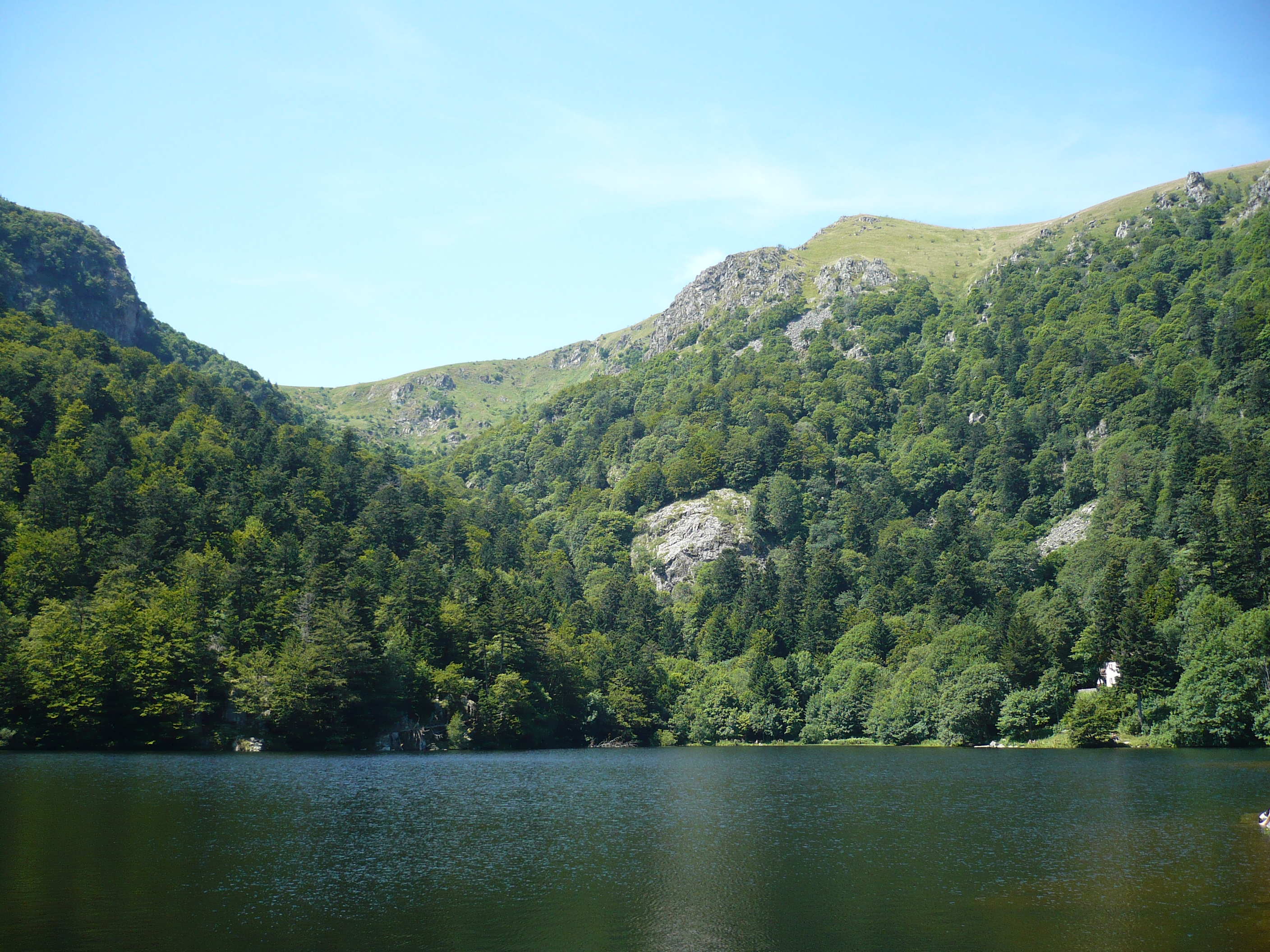
Schiessrothried, a glacial lake in the Vosges

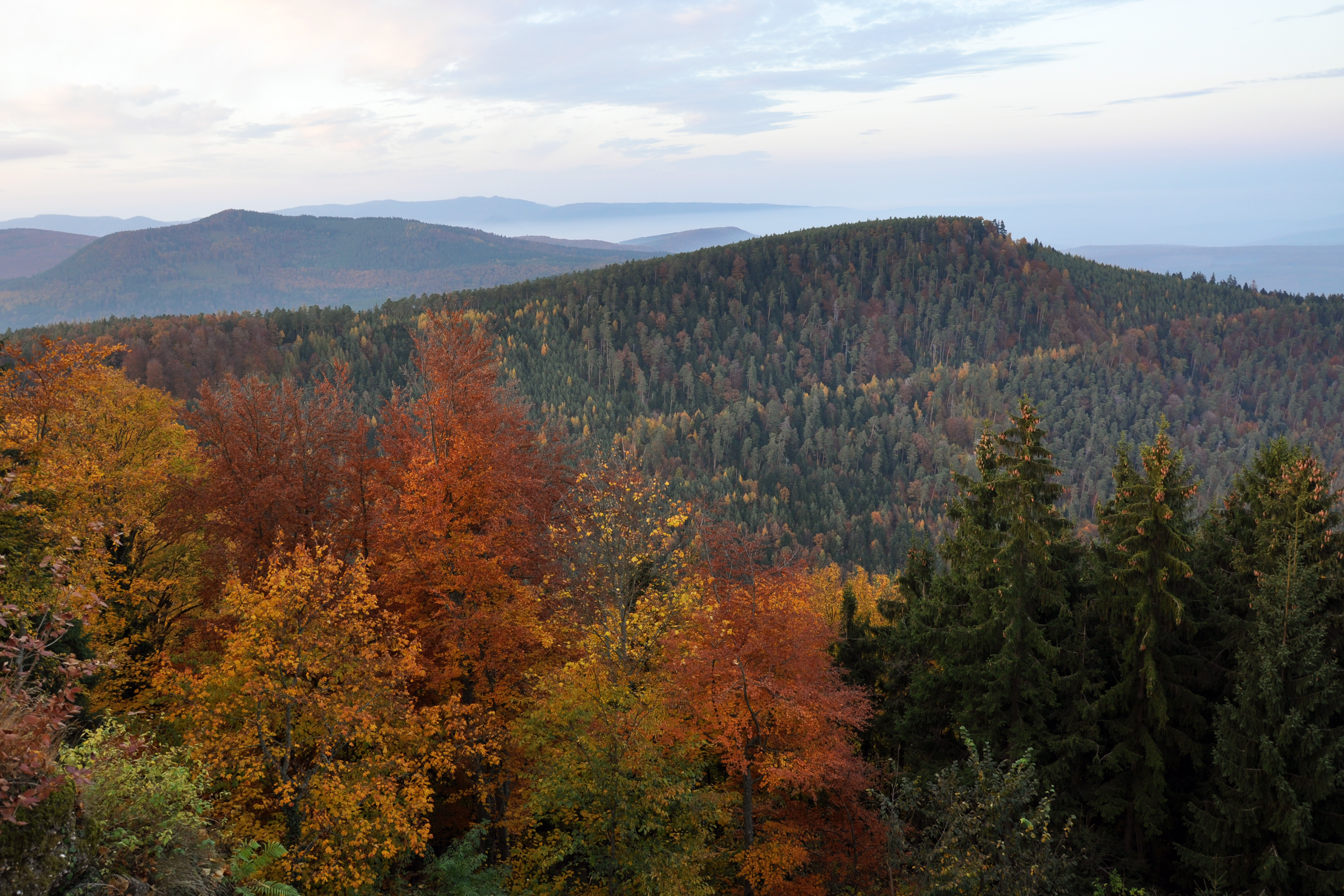
View from Mont Saint-Odile in autumn

Meteorologically, as a consequence of the Foehn effect the difference between the eastern and western mean slopes of the range is very marked. The main air streams come generally from the west and southwest, so the Alsatian central plains just under the Hautes-Vosges receive much less precipitation than the southwest slope of the Vosges Mountains. The highlands of the canton of Remiremont receive as annual rainfall or snowfall more than 2,000 mm (79 in) of precipitation yearly, whereas some dry countryside near Colmar receives less than 500 mm (20 in) of precipitation in the event of insufficient storms. The temperature is much lower in the west front of the mountains than in the low plains behind the massif, especially in summer. On the eastern slope economic vineyards reach to a height of 400 m (1,300 ft); on the other hand, in the mountains, it is a land of pasture and forest.

The only rivers in Alsace are the Ill coming from south Alsace (or Sundgau), and the Bruche d'Andlau and the Bruche which have as tributaries other, shorter but sometimes powerful streams coming like the last two from the Vosges Mountains. The rivers Moselle, Meurthe and Sarre and their numerous affluents all rise on the Lorraine side.

In the High Moselle and Meurthe basins, moraines, boulders and polished rocks testify to the former existence of glaciers which once covered the top of the Vosges. The mountain lakes caused by the original glacial phenomena are surrounded by pines, beeches and maples, and green meadows provide pasture for large herds of cattle, with views of the Rhine valley, the Black Forest and the distant, snow-covered Swiss mountains.

Ballon d'Alsace

Climate chart (precipitation, max. and min. temperature)
J	F	M	A	M	J	J	A	S	O	N	D
252 1 −3	204 1 −4	197 5 −1	124 9 2	179 13 6	135 17 9	149 19 11	157 18 11	154 14 8	211 10 5	215 5 1	289 2 −2
- █ Average max. and min. temperatures in °C
- █ Precipitation totals in mm
- Source: Meteociel.fr
Imperial conversion
J	F	M	A	M	J	J	A	S	O	N	D
9.9 34 26	8 35 26	7.7 40 30	4.9 49 36	7 56 43	5.3 63 49	5.9 65 52	6.2 65 52	6.1 58 46	8.3 51 41	8.5 41 33	11 36 28
- █ Average max. and min. temperatures in °F
- █ Precipitation totals in inches

== History ==
The massif known in Latin as Vosago mons or Vosego silva, sometimes Vogesus mons, was extended to the vast woods covering the region. Later, German speakers referred to the same region as Vogesen or Wasgenwald.

Over the centuries, settlement population density grew gradually, as was typical for a forested region. Forests were cleared for agriculture, livestock and early industrial factories (such as charcoal works and glassworks) and the water mills used water power. Concentrations of settlement and immigration took place and not only in areas where minerals were found. In the mining area of the Lièpvrette valley, for example, there was an influx of Saxon miners and mining specialists. From time to time, wars, plagues and religious conflicts saw the depopulation of territories—in their wake it was not uncommon for people to be relocated there from other areas.

On the lower heights and buttresses of the main chain on the Alsatian side are numerous castles, generally in ruins, testifying to the importance of this crucial crossroads of Europe, violently contested for centuries. At several points on the main ridge, especially at Sainte Odile above Ribeauvillé (German: Rappoltsweiler), are the remains of a wall of unmortared stone with tenons of wood, about 1.8 to 2.2 m (5 ft 11 in to 7 ft 3 in) thick and 1.3 to 1.7 m (4 ft 3 in to 5 ft 7 in) high, called the Mur Païen (Pagan Wall). It was used for defence in the Middle Ages and archaeologists are divided as to whether it was built by the Romans, or before their arrival.

During the French Revolutionary Wars, on 13 July 1794, the Vosges were the scene of the Battle of Trippstadt. From 1871 to 1918, they formed the main border line between France and the German Empire. The demarcation line stretched from the Ballon d'Alsace in the south to Mont Donon in the north with the lands east of it being incorporated into Germany as part of Alsace–Lorraine.

The Vosges saw extensive fighting during the world wars. During World War I, there was severe and almost continuous fighting in the mountains. During World War II in October 1944, there was a fierce battle between German forces and the U.S. 442nd Regiment, a segregated unit composed of second-generation Japanese Americans (Nisei), during which the 442nd charged straight up the mountain to rescue the 1st Battalion of the 36th Infantry, formerly the Texas Guard—also known as the "Lost Battalion"—who were cut off and stranded on the mountainside under heavy fire from the Germans. Two previous rescues failed. The 442nd suffered 800 casualties, rescued the Texans, and took the mountain.

On 20 January 1992 Air Inter Flight 148 crashed into the Vosges Mountains while circling to land at Strasbourg International Airport, killing 87 people.

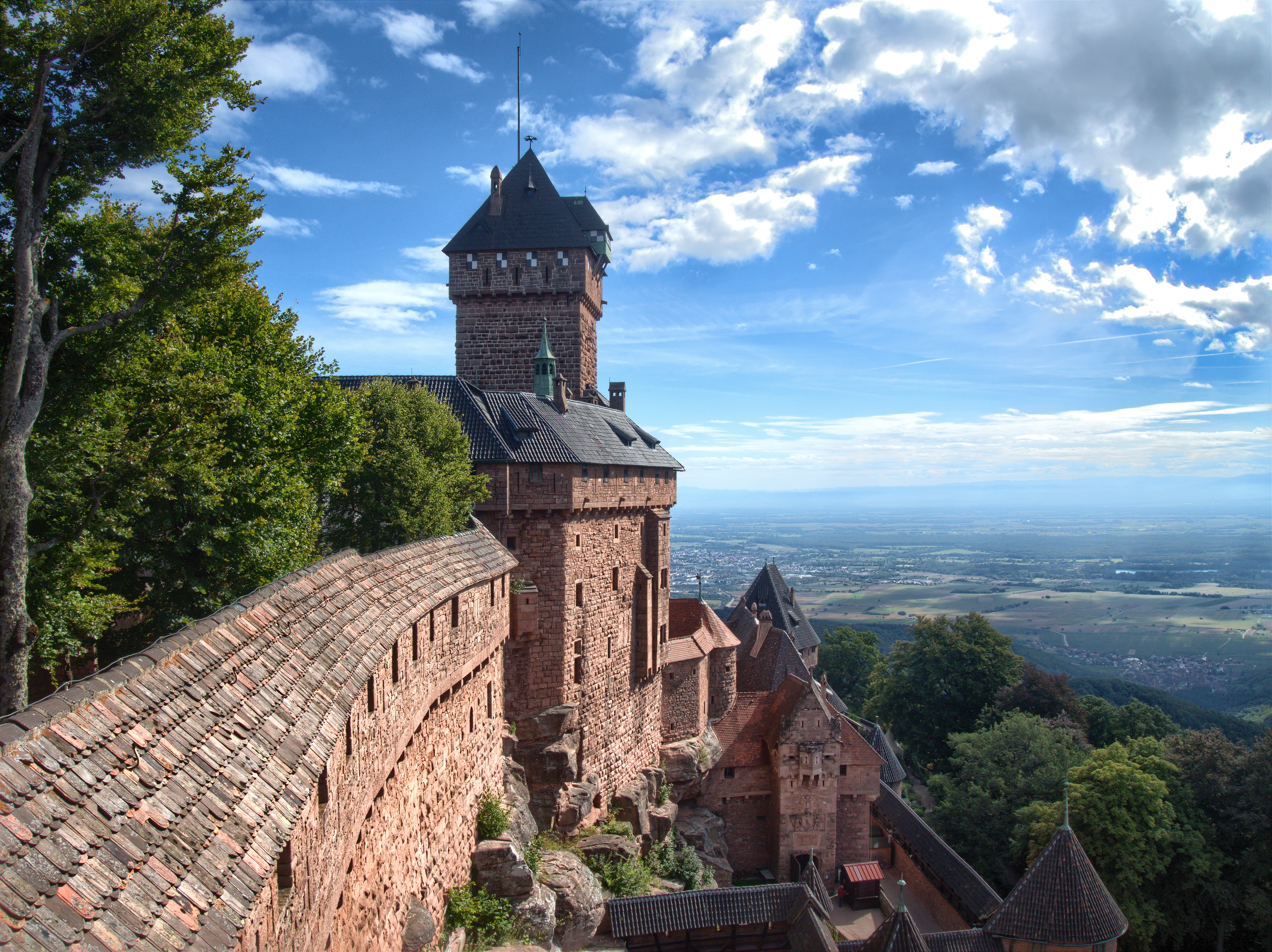
The Château du Haut-Koenigsbourg in the Vosges was built during the 12th century.

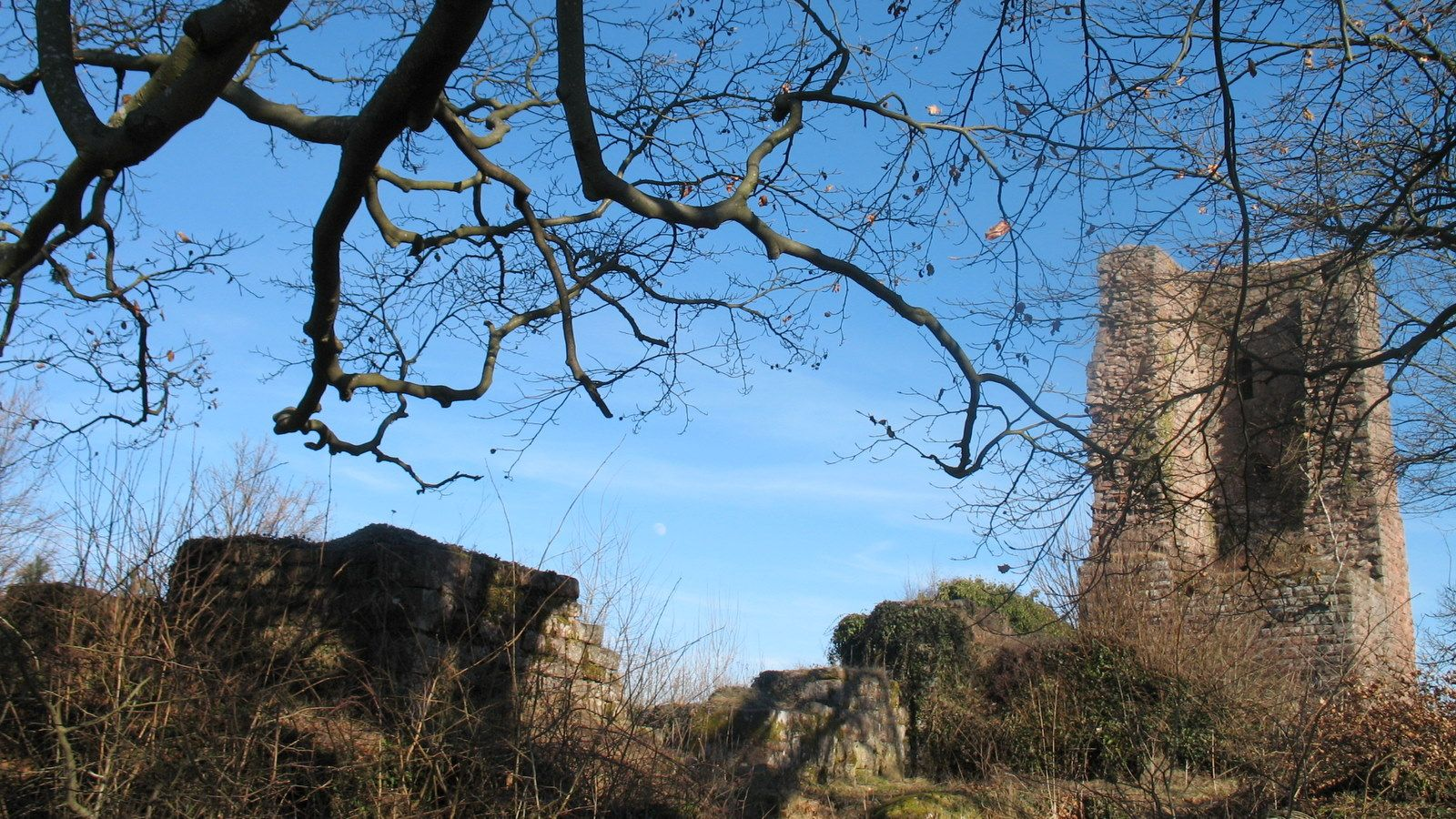
The Château du Grand-Geroldseck, now in ruins

=== Language ===
In pre-Roman times, the Vosges was empty of settlements or was colonised and dominated by the Celts. After the Roman era, Alemanni also settled in the east, and Franks in the northwest. Contrary to widespread belief, the main ridge of the Vosges coincided with the historical Roman-Germanic language boundary only in the southern Vosges. Old Romance (Altromanisch) is spoken east of the main ridge: in the valley of the Weiss around Lapoutroie, the valley of Lièpvrette (nowadays also called the Val d'Argent; "Valley of Silver"), parts of the canton of Villé valley (Vallée de Villé) and parts of the Bruche valley (Vallée de la Bruche). By contrast, those parts of the northern Vosges and the whole of the Wasgau, which lie north of the Breusch valley, fall within the Germanic-speaking area because, from Schirmeck the historical linguistic boundary turns to the northwest and runs between Donon and Mutzigfelsen heading for Sarrebourg (Saarburg). The Germanic areas of the Vosges mountains are part of the Alemannic dialect region and cultural area and, in the north, also part of the Frankish dialect region and cultural area. The Romance-speaking areas are traditionally part of the Lorrain language region in the west and the Frainc-Comtou region in the south. For a long time the distribution of languages and dialects basically correlated with the pattern of settlement movements. However, the switch from German to French as the lingua franca which took place between the 17th and the 20th centuries across the whole of Alsace was not accompanied by any further significant movements of population.

== See also ==
- Grès à Voltzia
- Flora of the Vosges massif
- Northern Vosges Regional Nature Park
- Vosges and Jura coal mining basins
- Vosges Keuperian coal mining basin
