= Gazon de Faîte =

Peak in the Vosges Mountains

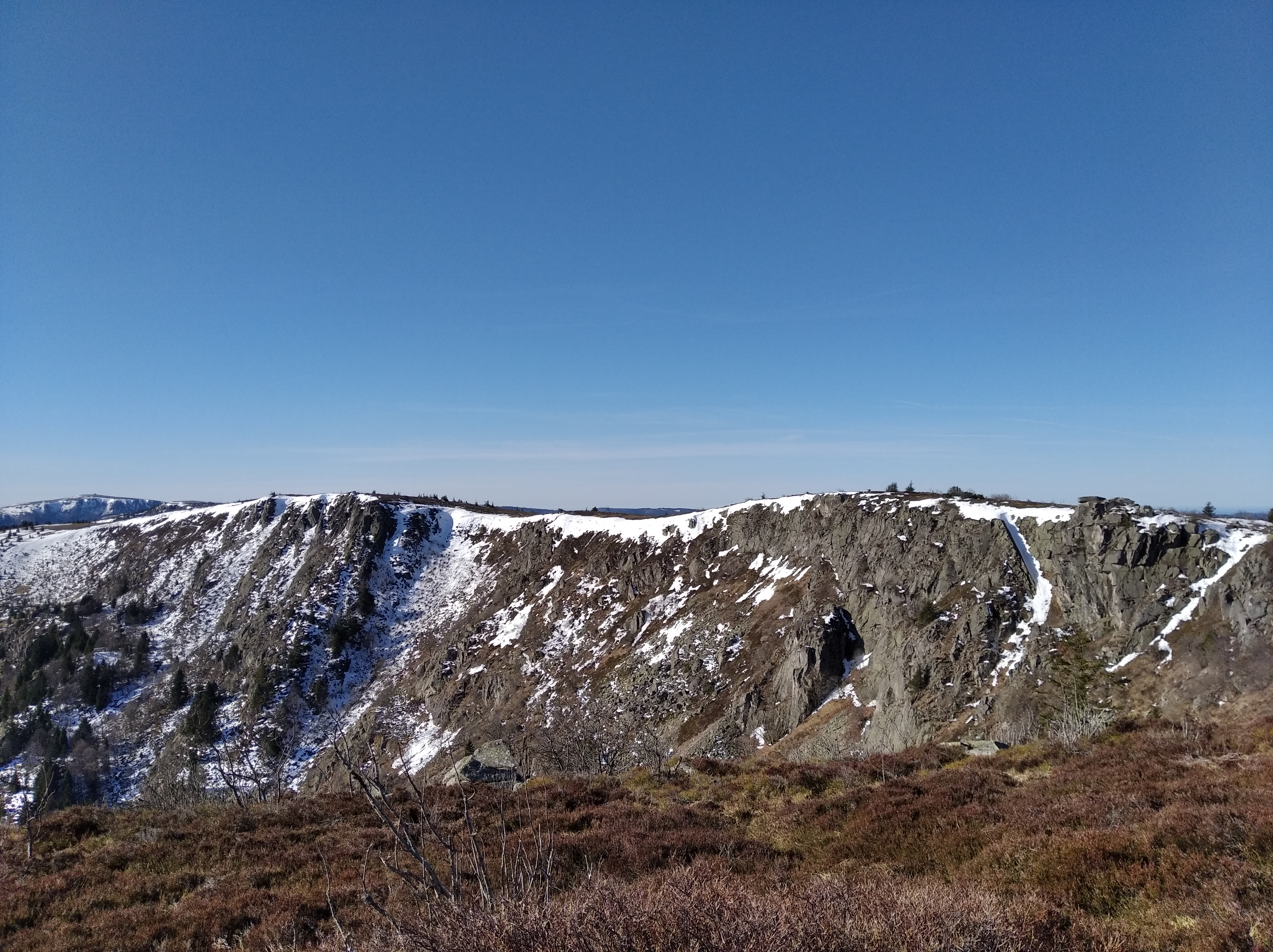
- Gazon de Faîte with the Hohneck in the background.

Highest point
- Elevation: 1,303 m (4,275 ft)
- Coordinates: 48°06′07″N 7°04′06″E

Geography
- Location within France
- Location: Alsace, Lorraine, France
- Parent range: Vosges Mountains

The Gazon de Faîte refers to a granite summit in the Vosges Mountains located on the ridge line between the Col du Bonhomme and the Col de la Schlucht, south of the Gazon du Faing and north of the Tanet or the Haut-Fourneau.

== Geography ==
With its altitude of 1,303 meters, this summit ranks among the fourteen highest in the massif. The summit is divided into:

- a rounded grassy prominence, reaching an altitude of 1,302 meters, which towers over Lac Vert by more than 250 meters;
- a north-northeastern cornice overhang, at 1,303 meters altitude, overlooking a glacial cirque containing Lac du Forlet 240 meters below.

The view towards the Lorraine slope and the Munster valley (Soultzeren-Stosswihr) is remarkable.

== History ==
No farmer or French-speaking administrator has proposed an altimetric description of this pasture or grassland. German hikers from the Belle Époque era, benefiting from a cog railway that brought them up with a compact crowd to the Schlucht and then to the Hohneck, were the first to request detailed maps of the Vosges ridges. Associations, such as the German predecessor of the Vosges Club, or Alsatian publishers, took care of this task meticulously, Germanizing vast spaces that the highland farmers, aware of their laborious and ephemeral seasonal presence, which was also imposed by authority, had never considered naming for any purpose other than tradition.

== See also ==
- Vosges Mountains
