= Gazon du Faing =

Peak in the Vosges Mountains

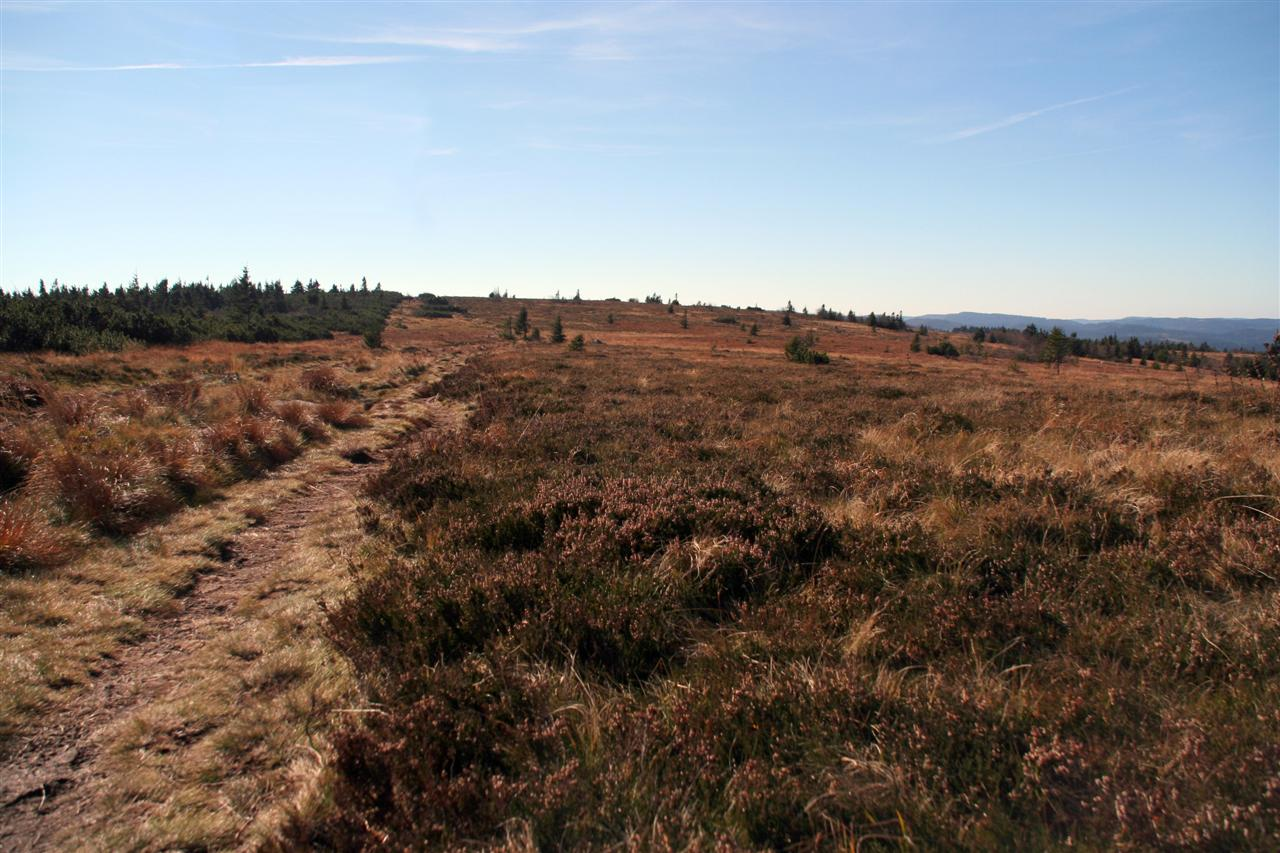
- View of the pastures of the Gazon du Faing.

Highest point
- Elevation: 1,306 m (4,285 ft)
- Coordinates: 48°06′49″N 7°04′45″E

Geography
- Location within France
- Location: Alsace, Lorraine, France
- Parent range: Vosges Mountains

The Gazon du Faing is a granitic summit of the Vosges massif located on the ridge line between the Col du Bonhomme and the Col de la Schlucht in eastern France.

The panorama towards the Orbey valley and the Munster valley (Soultzeren-Stosswihr) is remarkable. The Black Forest, the Jura, and the Alps are also visible in clear weather.

== Geography ==
This nearly flat summit with rounded edges, ranking among the ten highest in the massif, has a fairly steep slope on the Alsatian side, giving rise to a glacial cirque that harbors Lac Noir 350 meters below.

The Soultzeren Eck, meaning the "boundary corner of Soultzeren," is a boundary point shared by three municipalities: Soultzeren and Orbey on the Alsatian side, and Plainfaing on the Lorraine side. This late toponymic formation, for altimetric identification purposes in the Belle Époque, follows the same linguistic genesis as that of the Ringbuhl.

== History ==
The vast mountain pasture, with its evocative name, which is now partly abandoned, stretched across the Lorraine slope, overlooking the Col du Louschbach and especially the upper valley of the River Meurthe nearly 600 meters below. It was allocated to the municipality of Plainfaing after the division of the high mountain pastures with the municipality of Le Valtin, during the Restoration period. Its farm-inn is located along the Route des Crêtes, at an altitude of 1,225 meters, south of the former pasture.

== See also ==
- Vosges Mountains
