= Col du Calvaire =

Mountain pass in France

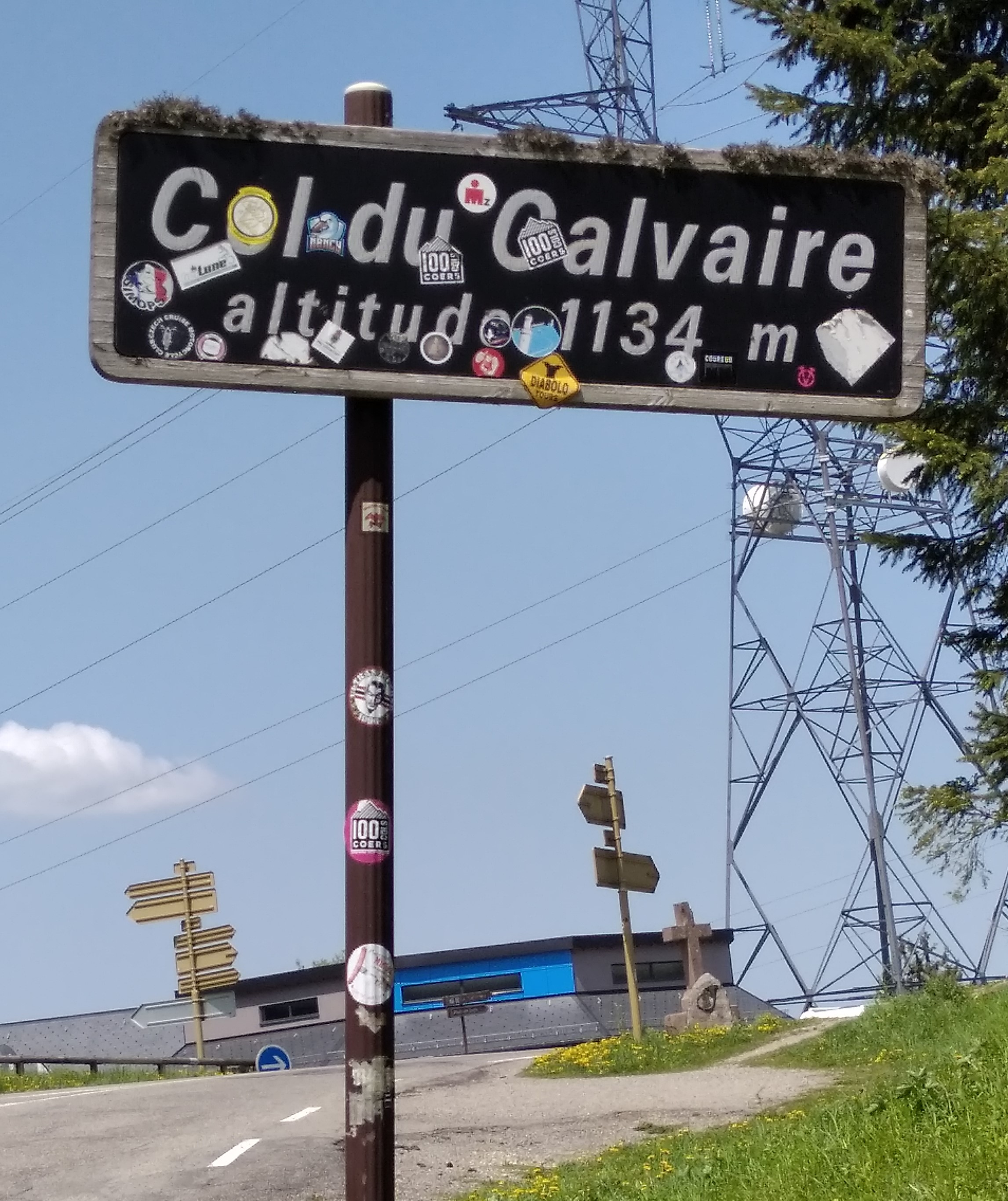

- Location within France
- Elevation: 1,144 m (3,753 ft)

Third Approach
- Location: Haut-Rhin, France
- Range: Vosges Mountains
- Coordinates: 48°08′11″N 7°05′19″E

The Col du Calvaire (French pronunciation: [kɔl dy kalvɛʁ]) is a mountain pass in the Vosges Mountains connecting Le Valtin in the Vosges to Orbey in the Haut-Rhin.

== Etymology ==
It owes its name to a Calvary, formerly known as the "Calvary above Lac Blanc".

== Geography ==
=== Location ===
Situated at an elevation of 1,144 metres (3,753 ft), the pass connects the Béhine valley, starting from Le Bonhomme, and the high Alsace valley of the Weiss to Orbey. It lies on the Route des Crêtes between the Col du Bonhomme and the Col de la Schlucht.

=== Access ===
From Le Valtin, the pass begins with the ascent of the Col du Louschbach leading to the Route des Crêtes (D 148) up to the Col du Calvaire. Generally, from the west side, the pass is accessed directly via the Route des Crêtes rather than the ascent from the Valtin forest road. From Orbey, the pass is accessed by following the departmental road D 48 then D 48.2 which runs along the Lac Blanc just before the pass.

== History ==
During the World War I, the German front line extended from the Calvary, followed the southern slope to reach the tête des Faux and Orbey.

== Activities ==
=== Cycling ===
==== Tour de France ====
The pass has been used three times in the Tour de France, most recently in 2001.

Year	Stage	Category	Start	Finish	Leader at the summit
2001	7	2	Nancy	Mulhouse	Laurent Jalabert (FRA)
1992	11	3	Strasbourg	Mulhouse	Rolf Gölz (GER)
1976	7	3	Strasbourg	Colmar	Luciano Conati (ITA)

=== Winter Sports ===
In winter, the pass is inaccessible from the Col de la Schlucht to make way for the ski slopes maintained by the Lac Blanc ski station.
