= Plainfaing =

- Commune
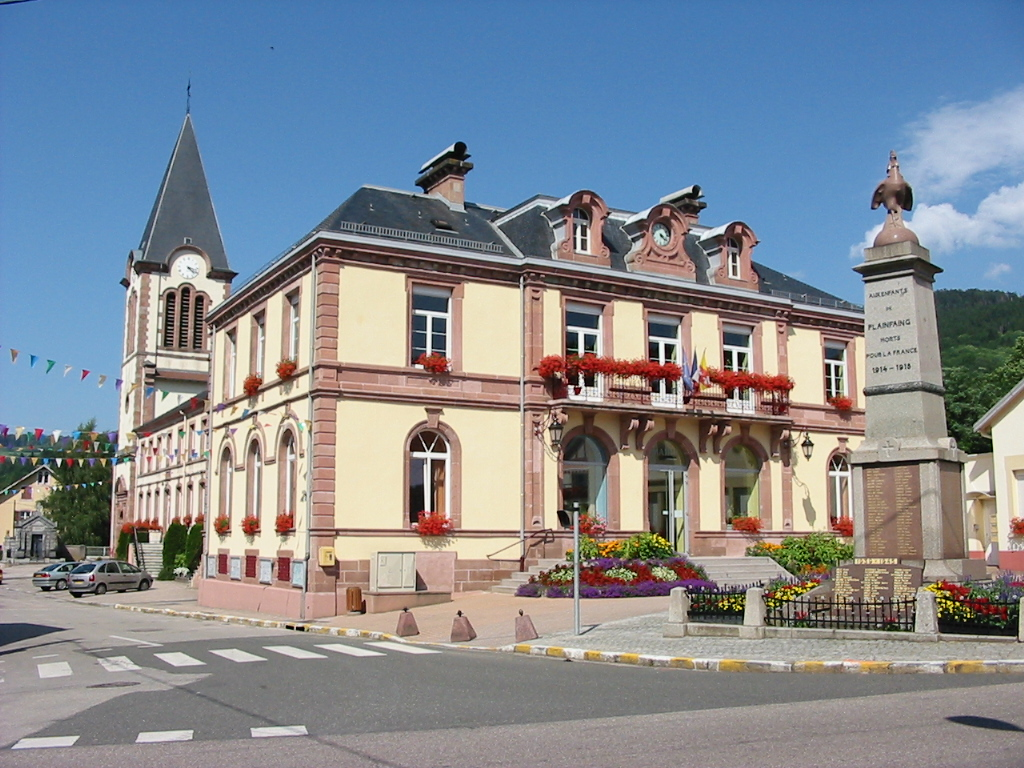
- The town hall in Plainfaing

- Coat of arms
- Location of Plainfaing
- Location within France Location within Grand Est
- Coordinates: 48°10′23″N 7°00′50″E
- Country: France
- Region: Grand Est
- Department: Vosges
- Arrondissement: Saint-Dié-des-Vosges
- Canton: Gérardmer
- Intercommunality: CA Saint-Dié-des-Vosges

Government
  - Mayor (2020–2026): Patrick Lalevée
- Area^{1}: 38.56 km^{2} (14.89 sq mi)
- Elevation: 531 m (1,742 ft)
- Highest elevation: 1,302 m (4,272 ft)
- Lowest elevation: 518 m (1,699 ft)
- Population (2023): 1,569
  - Density: 40.69/km^{2} (105.4/sq mi)
- Time zone: UTC+01:00 (CET)
  - Summer (DST): UTC+02:00 (CEST)
- INSEE/Postal code: 88349 /88230
- ^{1} French Land Register data, which excludes lakes, ponds, glaciers > 1 km^{2} (0.386 sq mi or 247 acres) and river estuaries.

Plainfaing (French pronunciation: [plɛ̃fɛ̃]) is a commune in the Vosges department in Grand Est in northeastern France.

== Geography ==
The commune is positioned in the east of the department, at the foot of the 949 meter high Bonhomme Pass (Col du Bonhomme), between Saint-Dié-des-Vosges (17 km (11 mi)) to the west and Colmar (41 km (25 mi)) in neighbouring Alsace to the east. The river Meurthe rises in the nearby commune of Le Valtin and crosses Plainfaing from the south, and is joined by the stream from the Chaume valley. A designated natural reserve of half a square kilometre is shared between Valtin and Plainfaing, and includes the peaks of the Tanet and the Gazon du Faing.

== Demographic evolution ==
Historical population
Year	Pop.	±% p.a.
1968	2,803	—
1975	2,402	−2.18%
1982	2,235	−1.02%
1990	1,948	−1.70%
1999	1,764	−1.10%
2007	1,819	+0.38%
2012	1,768	−0.57%
2017	1,676	−1.06%
2023	1,569	−1.09%
Source: INSEE

== Economy ==
Plainfaing is the headquarters of the Confiserie des Hautes-Vosges, an artisanal company taken over by the Claudepierre family in 1986 and specializing in the production of nearly 35 types of candies made from natural flavors or essential oils. The company produces an average of 250 tons of candy per year. Guided tours of the workshops are offered to visitors. The confectionery welcomed nearly 180,000 visitors in 2010.

== Born in Plainfaing ==
- Raymond Ruyer, philosopher

== See also ==
- Communes of the Vosges department
