= Col du Louschbach =

Mountain pass in France

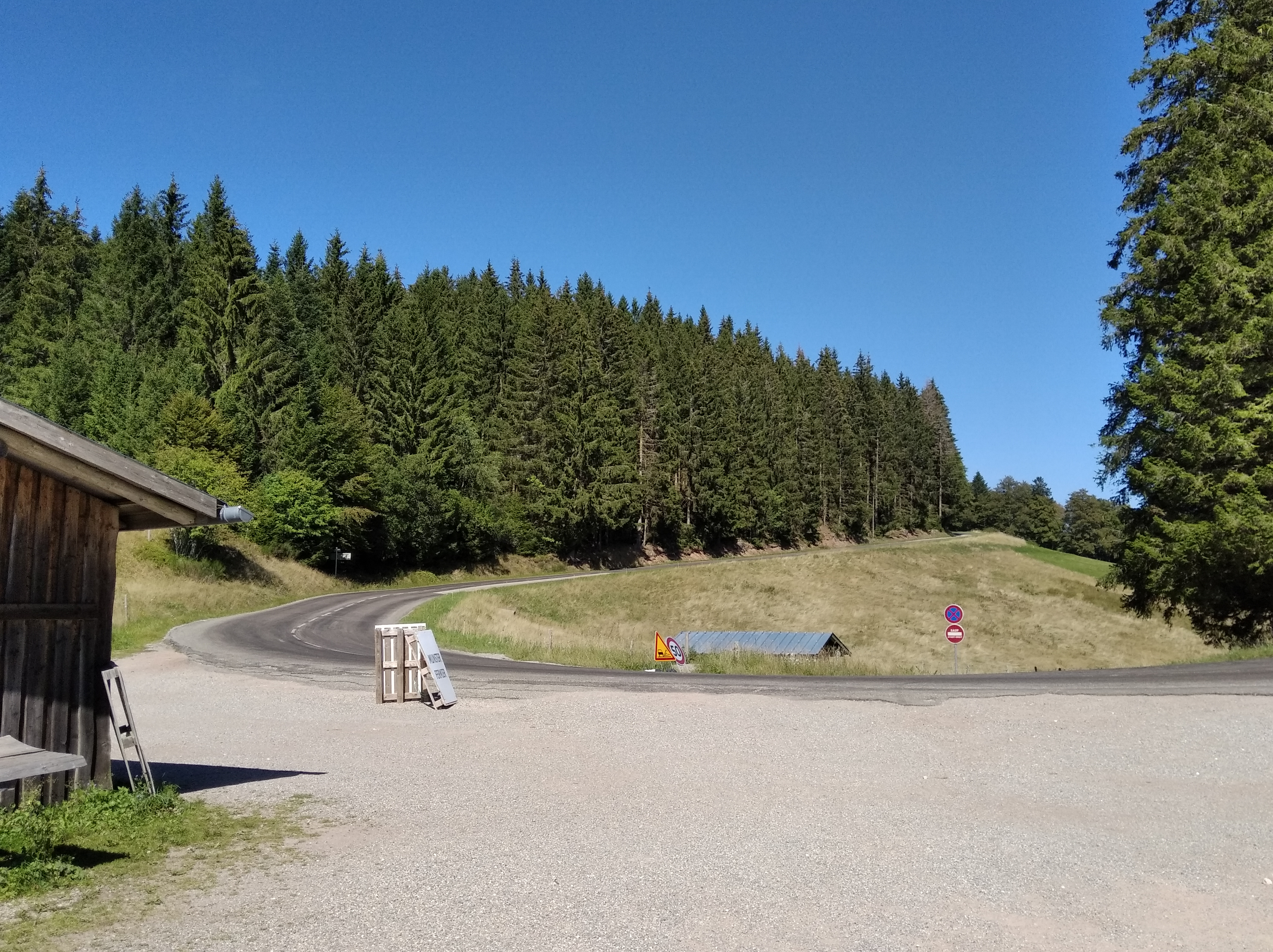

- Location within Alps
- Elevation: 978 metres (3,209 ft)
- Traversed by: D148

Third Approach
- Location: Haut-Rhin / Vosges, France
- Range: Vosges Mountains
- Coordinates: 48°08′11″N 7°03′41″E

The Col du Louschbach (French pronunciation: [kɔl dy luʃbax]) is a secondary mountain pass in the Vosges Massif. It is a crossing point on the Route des Crêtes (D 148).

== Toponymy ==
Louschbach is a dialectal toponym of Germanic origin derived from the Lorraine vernacular. Its oldest recorded written form is Luxpach (1580). It is composed of lux, meaning ‘lynx’ in Lorraine, and pach, meaning ‘stream’, that is, ‘the lynx’s stream’.

== Geography ==
Located at an elevation of 978 m, the pass links Le Valtin in the Vosges to Le Bonhomme in the Haut-Rhin. It links the upper Lorraine valley of the Meurthe, from the Rudlin near Le Valtin, with the upper Alsatian valley of the Weiss — more precisely one of its tributaries, the Béhine, which flows through the commune of Le Bonhomme. It intersects the Route des Crêtes between the Col du Bonhomme and the Col du Calvaire.

== History ==
It was the scene of fighting during the Second World War.
