= Schiessrothried =

Lake in France

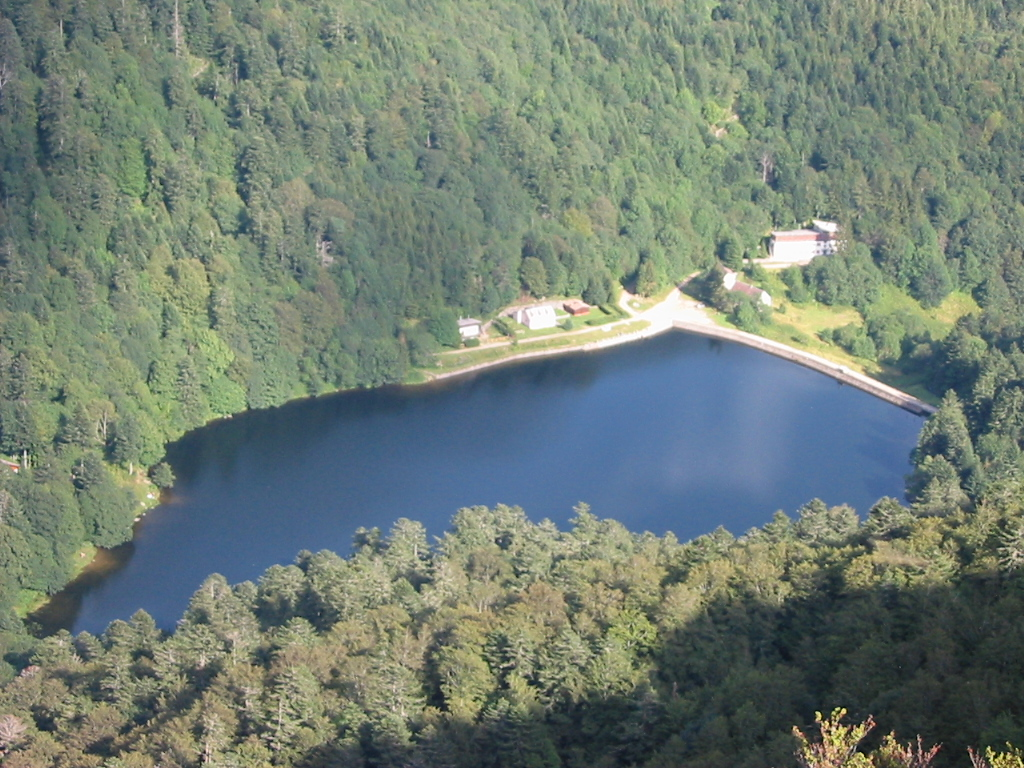
- Schiessrothried from Col de Wormsel

- Location within France
- Location: Haut-Rhin
- Coordinates: 48.029722°N 7.025278°E
- Primary outflows: Wormsabachrunz
- Basin countries: France
- Surface area: 5.6 ha (14 acres)
- Max. depth: 11 m (36 ft)
- Surface elevation: 926 m (3,038 ft)

Schiessrothried is a small lake, also known as Lac de Schiessrothried, in the Alsatian side of the Vosges, of glacial origin. It is located at an elevation of 926 m, its surface area is 0.056 km^{2}.

Its waters eventually join the Fecht (a local river) via a small tributary, the Wormsabachrunz, which empties into Lac de Fischboedle, which is nearby. It is located near the foot of Hohneck and near the Kastelberg, in the Wormsa Valley. It was originally a bog and only became a lake after a small barrage was built, making many believe that it is of natural origin.

The purpose of the dam was to regulate the flow of water to the textile mills and sawmills in the Munster valley, most of which were supplied with electricity independently.

The lake is a popular tourist destination and can be reached by car from Muhlbach-sur-Munster via a small mountain road (a side road of the D310).

The lake is surrounded by many hiking trails marked out by the Club Vosgien.
