= Le Tanet =

Mountain in France

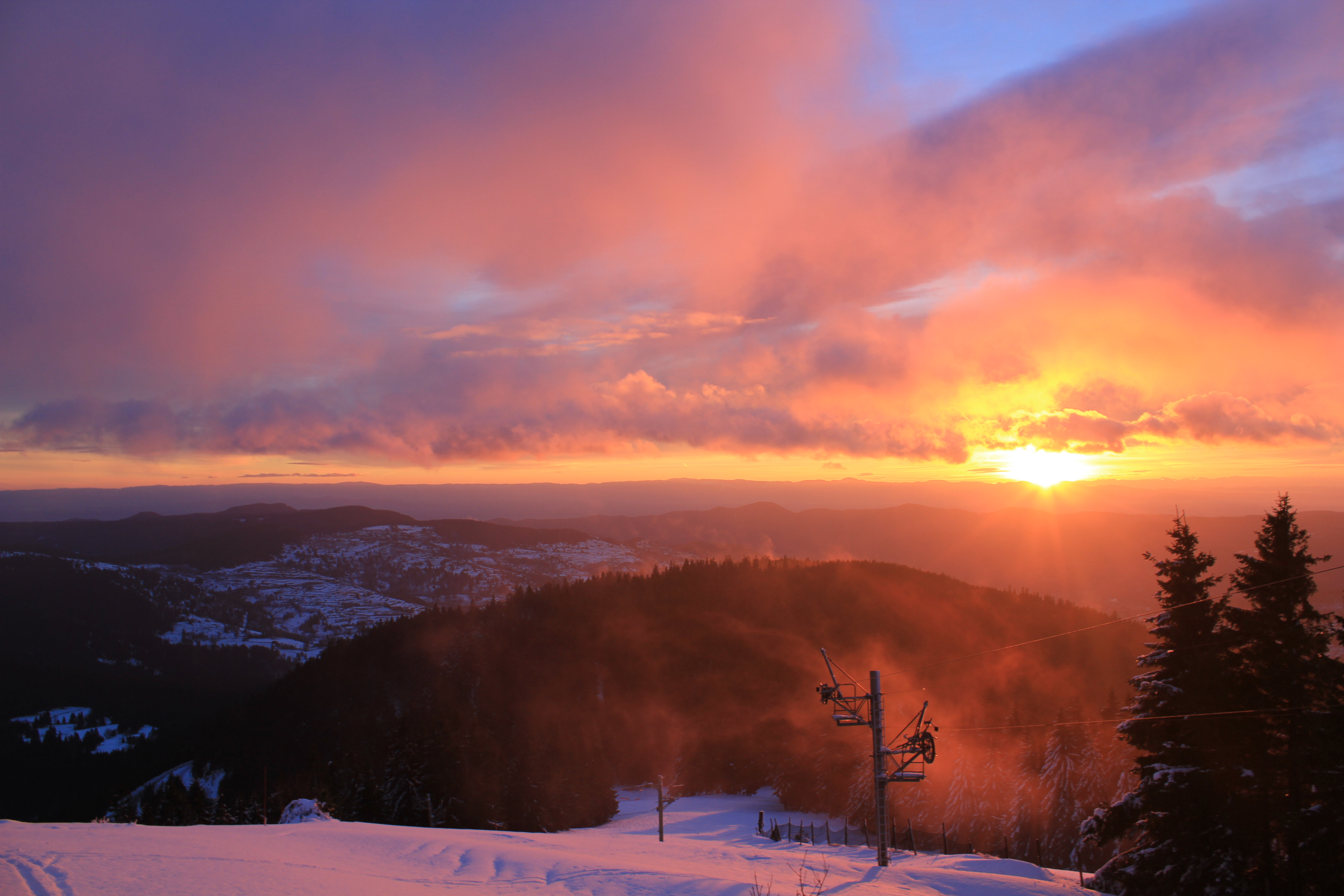
- Sunrise at the top of the slopes of Le Tanet

Highest point
- Elevation: 1,292 m (4,239 ft)
- Coordinates: 48°05′00″N 7°03′07″E

Geography
- Location within France
- Location: Haut-Rhin, Alsace, France
- Parent range: Vosges Mountains

Le Tanet (Tanneck) is one of the highest peaks of the Vosges Mountains in the department of Haut-Rhin, Alsace in France. Its height is 1292m, above the sea level and it is located about 5 km away from the Hohneck and north of the Col de la Schlucht. Near the Tanet the Route des Cretes crosses the Col de la Schlucht and the Lac Blanc. About the ridge runs the GR 5 across the border between Alsace and Lorraine. From the east the Tanet is accessible via a ski slope from the Auberge du Tanet - Seestaedtlé.

Between Tanet and Gazon de Faîte (1303 m) in the north there is a raised bog, which is designated as a nature reserve (Réserve naturelle).
