= Dom George Franck =

French organist and composer

Dom George Franck (c. 1690 – 1760) in Munster in Alsace, was a French organist and composer.

== Biography ==
Born in Munster, Dom George Franck was a Benedict monk at the Munster Abbey (Haut-Rhin), and parish priest at Munster val St. Gregory in Alsace. All that is known about him comes from the cover of his sonata collection published around 1740, as well as occasional references to the pipe organ of which he seems to have been an expert.

== Work ==
- 4 Sonatas for organ or harpsichord. Pièces choisies et partagées en différents œuvres, accommodées dans le goust moderne pour l'Orgue et le Clavecin par le R. P. Dom George Franck, bénédictin et Curé à Munster val St-Grégoire en Alsace. Œuvre Ier. Sold by Mr Fontaine md. libraire à Colmar; at J. Franck (engraver) and J. Humbert in Munster. [c. 1740]
  - Sonata 1a. (C major): Ouvertura (Grave) – Allegro – Aria (Andante) – Allegro assai – Minuetto Rondeau
  - Sonata 2a. (F major): Vivace – Allegro for three hands – Rondeau (Allegro) – Menuet and 4 var.
  - Sonata terza (B flat major): Allegro – Pieces for three hands (Allegro moderato) – Allegro assai – Triolet (Tenderly) – Minuetto (Gratioso)
  - Sonata 4a. (D major): Allegro – Aria 1a (Gratioso) – Aria 2a (Variatio) – Allegro – Menuet (Gratioso) – Minor.

== Sources ==
- Bibliothèque nationale de France, music department, VM7-1845. Gallica
- "The second organ of the place (Eguisheim) was built by Jean-Baptiste Waltrin in 1746, in a case by Ketterer of Colmar. Jean-André Silbermann, never left behind when it was a question of insisting on the failings of its competitors, specifies that this Waltrin organ was received unfinished by Dom George Franck, from Munster."
- History of the organ of the Toul Cathedral. "Around 1749, Johann Andreas Silbermann, famous organ factor of Strasbourg, was warned by Dom Georges Franck, Benedictine of the Abbey of Munster (Haut-Rhin), that the canons of the Toul cathedral had reserved 30,000 lt for the construction of a new organ."
