= Lac des Truites =

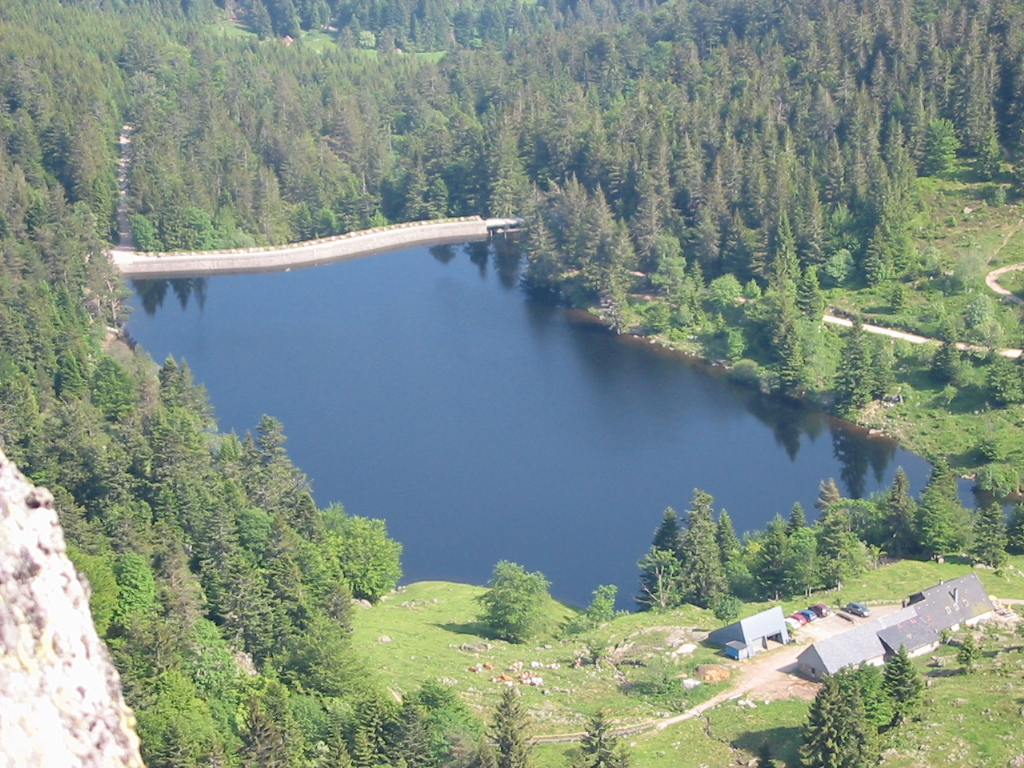

- Location within France
- Location: Haut-Rhin
- Coordinates: 48.101944°N 7.077222°E
- Type: reservoir, glacial
- Primary outflows: Seebach, a sub-tributary of the Ill
- Catchment area: 1 km^{2} (0.39 sq mi)
- Basin countries: France
- Surface area: 2.8 ha (6.9 acres)
- Surface elevation: 1,061 m (3,481 ft)

Lac des Truites is a lake in the municipality of Soultzeren (Haut-Rhin, France). It means Lake of Trouts in English (when translated literally).

== Geography ==
At an elevation of 1061m, its surface area is 2.8 hectares and is the highest lake of the Vosges massif. The lake on one side has been made into a barrage, in part to fortify the lakeside but also making it possible to regulate the flow of water into the Fecht (a local river, which is a tributary of the Ill, which itself is a tributary of the Rhine).

== Toponymy ==
The original Alsatian name of the lake was Förlenweier. Frenchifying the toponyms of Alsace, the lake was first called Lac du Foehrlé (ö is often spelled or changed to oe, as in Fischboedle) which then became Lac du Forlet (which it is still called on many maps and waymarks).

It seems however that French authorities misread Förle as a diminutive of the German word Forelle which in French is truite (in English trout), whence the name, when in fact it is a diminutive of Föhre which means pine, meaning the name was in fact lake surrounded by small pine. It may also have something to do with the fact that the Abbey of Murbach used the lake as a reservoir for trout (which can still be seen in the lake).

In Welche (a regional dialect) the lake is called reïf tou blan.
