= Weiss (river) =

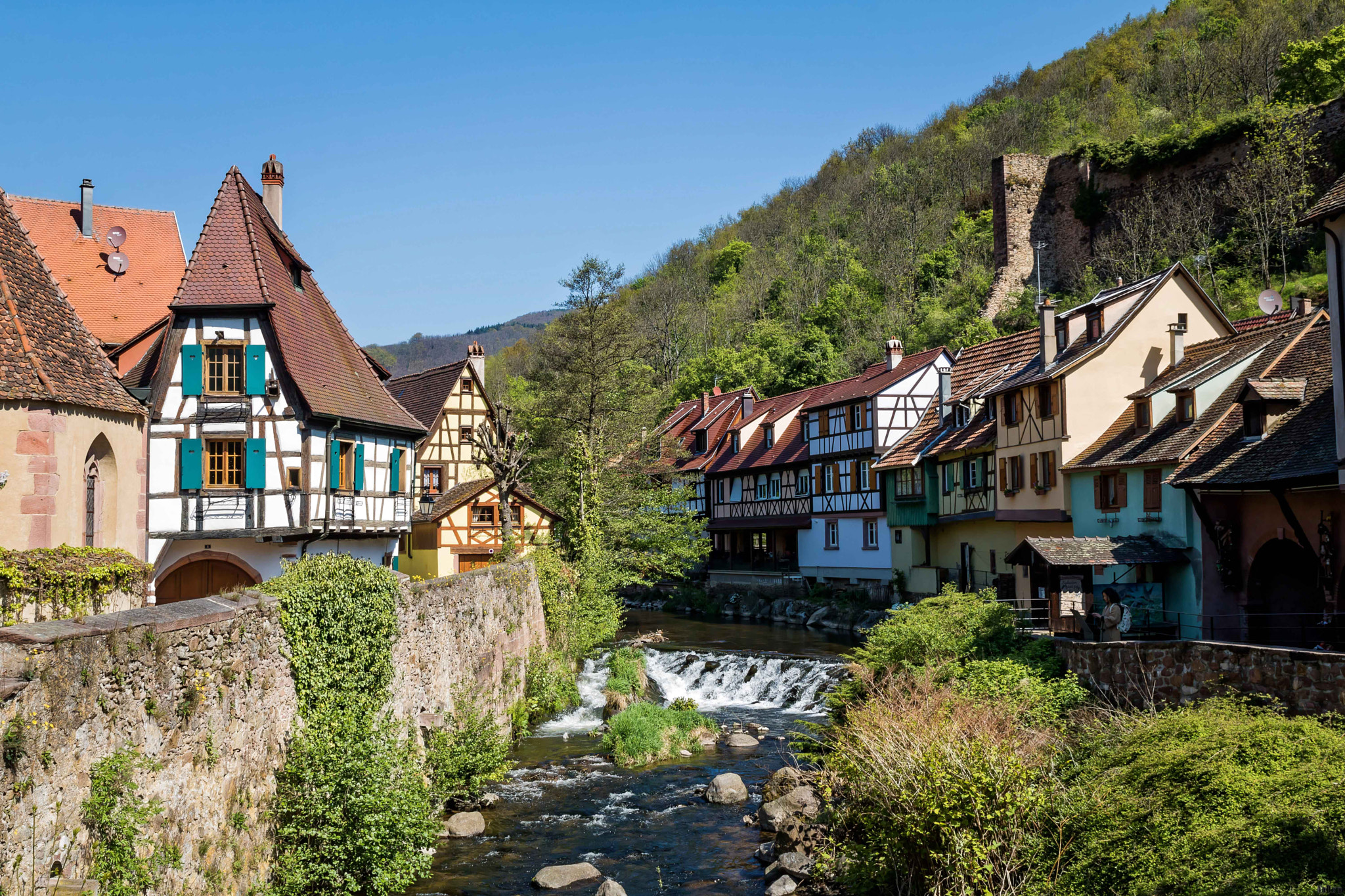
- The Weiss in Kaysersberg

- Location within France Location within Grand Est

Location
- Country: France

Physical characteristics
- Source: Vosges Mountains
- Mouth: Fecht
  - location: Illhaeusern
  - coordinates: 48°07′27″N 7°20′11″E
- Length: 24 km (15 mi)

Basin features
- Progression: Fecht→ Ill→ Rhine→ North Sea

The Weiss is a river in the Haut-Rhin department, northeastern France. It rises in the Vosges Mountains near the Lac Blanc and joins the river Fecht (a tributary of the Ill) near Bennwihr, north of Colmar, after a course of 24 kilometres (15 mi). It flows through Orbey and Kaysersberg.
