= Fecht (river) =

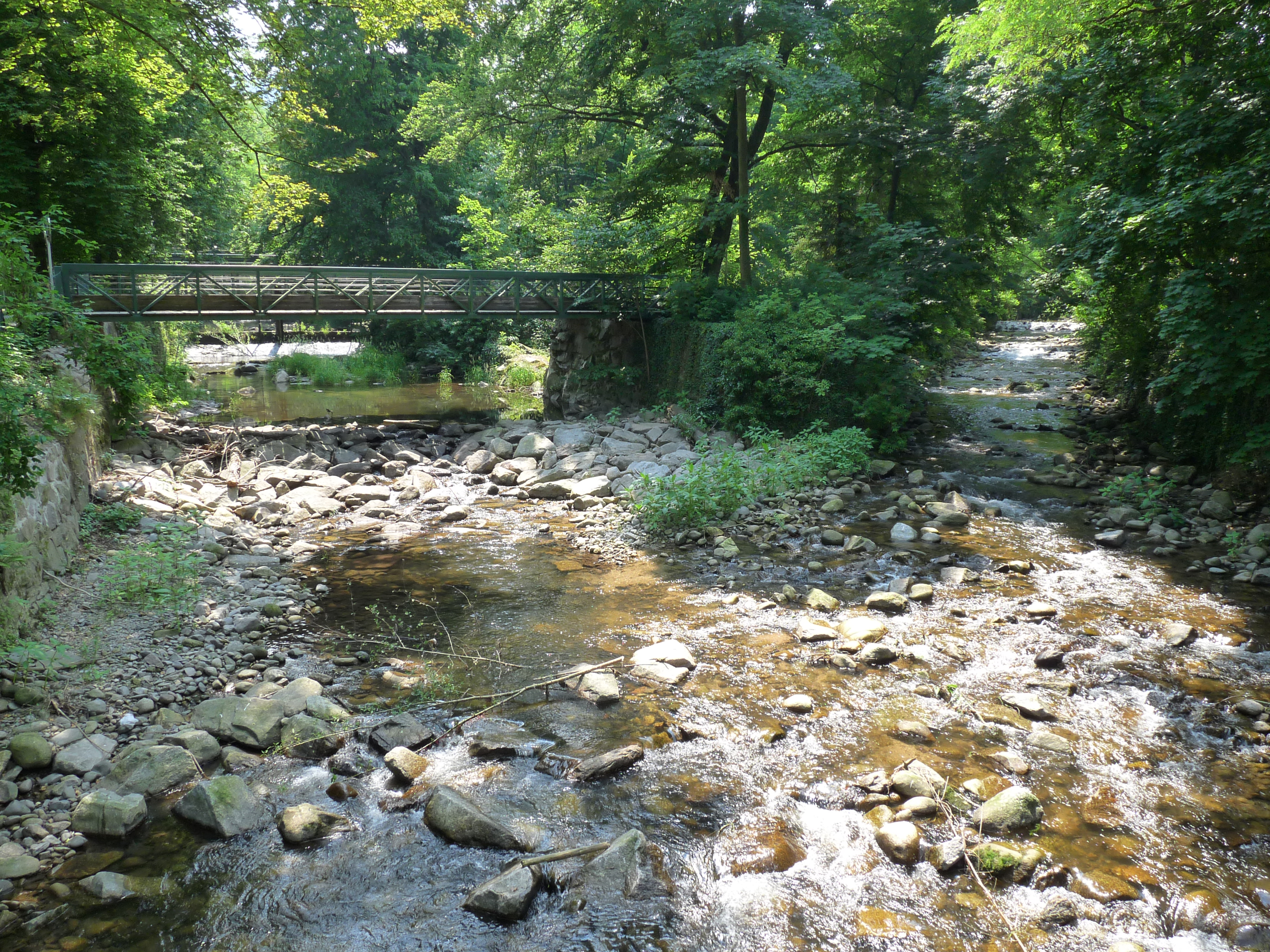

- Location within France Location within Grand Est

Location
- Country: France

Physical characteristics
- Source: Vosges Mountains
- Mouth: Ill
  - location: Illhaeusern
  - coordinates: 48°10′58″N 7°25′49″E
- Length: 49 km (30 mi)

Basin features
- Progression: Ill→ Rhine→ North Sea
- Tributaries
  - left: Weiss, Strengbach

The Fecht (French pronunciation: [fɛʃt]) is a river in the Haut-Rhin department, northeastern France. Its source is located between the Lauchenkopf and the Breitfirst. It rises in the Vosges Mountains near Metzeral and joins the river Ill (a tributary of the Rhine) at Illhaeusern, north of Colmar, after a course of 49 kilometres (30 mi). It flows through Munster and Turckheim. Its longest tributaries are the Weiss and the Strengbach.
