= Lac Noir (Vosges) =

French lake

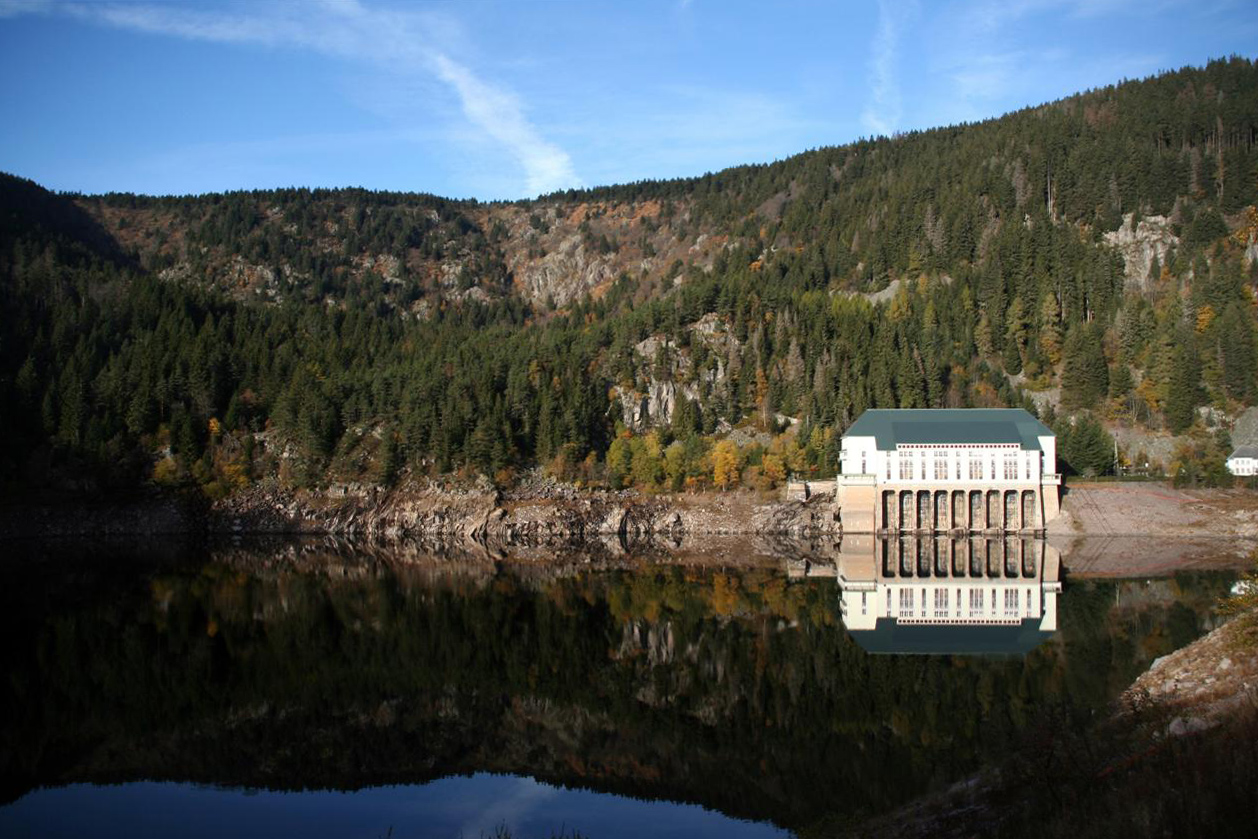

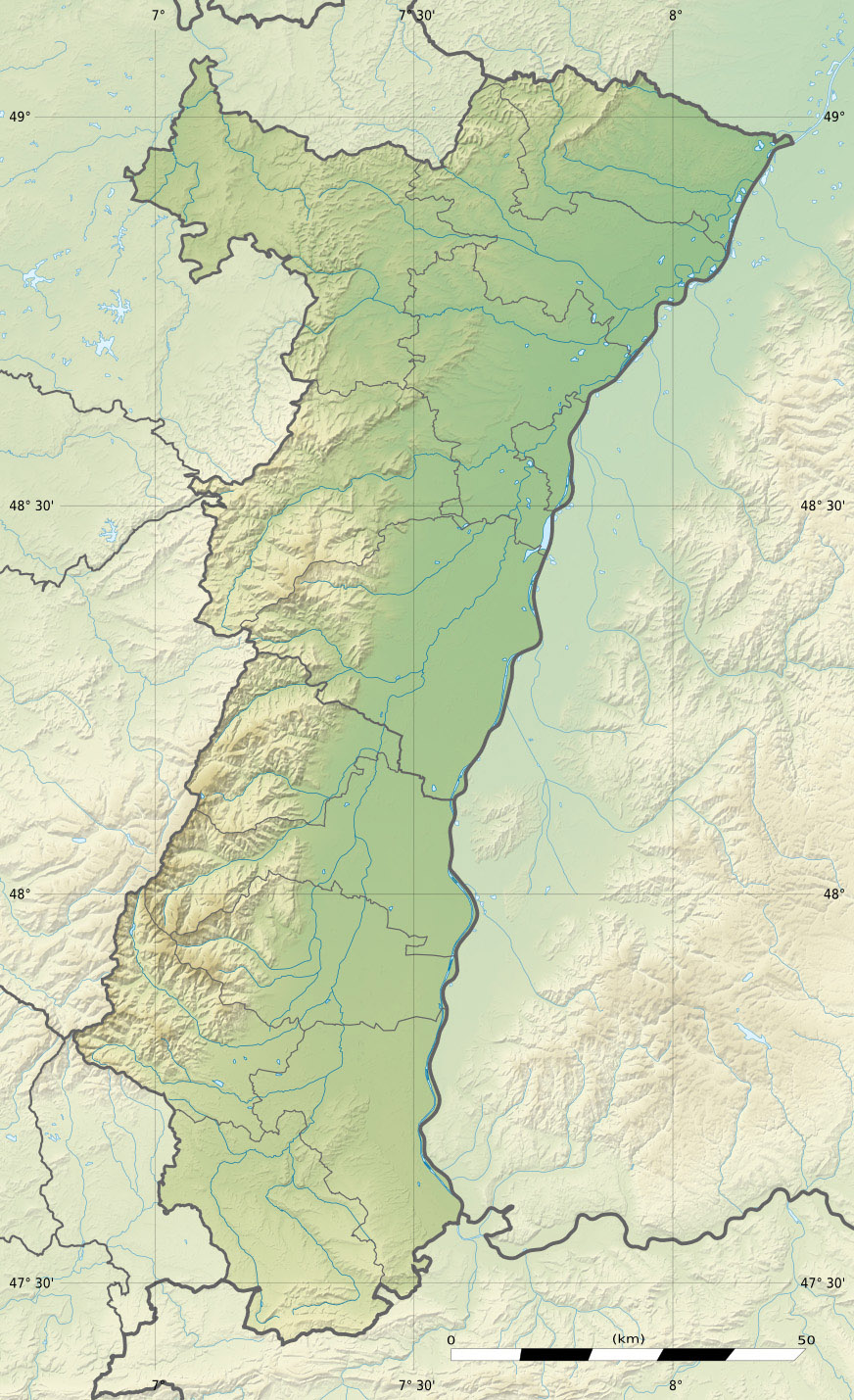
- Location within Alsace
- Location: Orbey, Alsace
- Coordinates: 48.1125°N 7.097222°E
- Basin countries: France
- Surface area: 0.14 km^{2} (0.054 sq mi)
- Max. depth: 45 m (148 ft)
- Surface elevation: 955 m (3,133 ft)

Lac Noir is a lake in Orbey, Alsace, France. At an elevation of 955 m, its surface area is 0.14 km^{2}.
