= Paul Haeberlin =

French chef and restaurateur

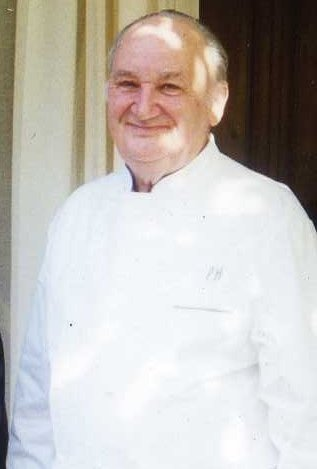
Paul Haeberlin

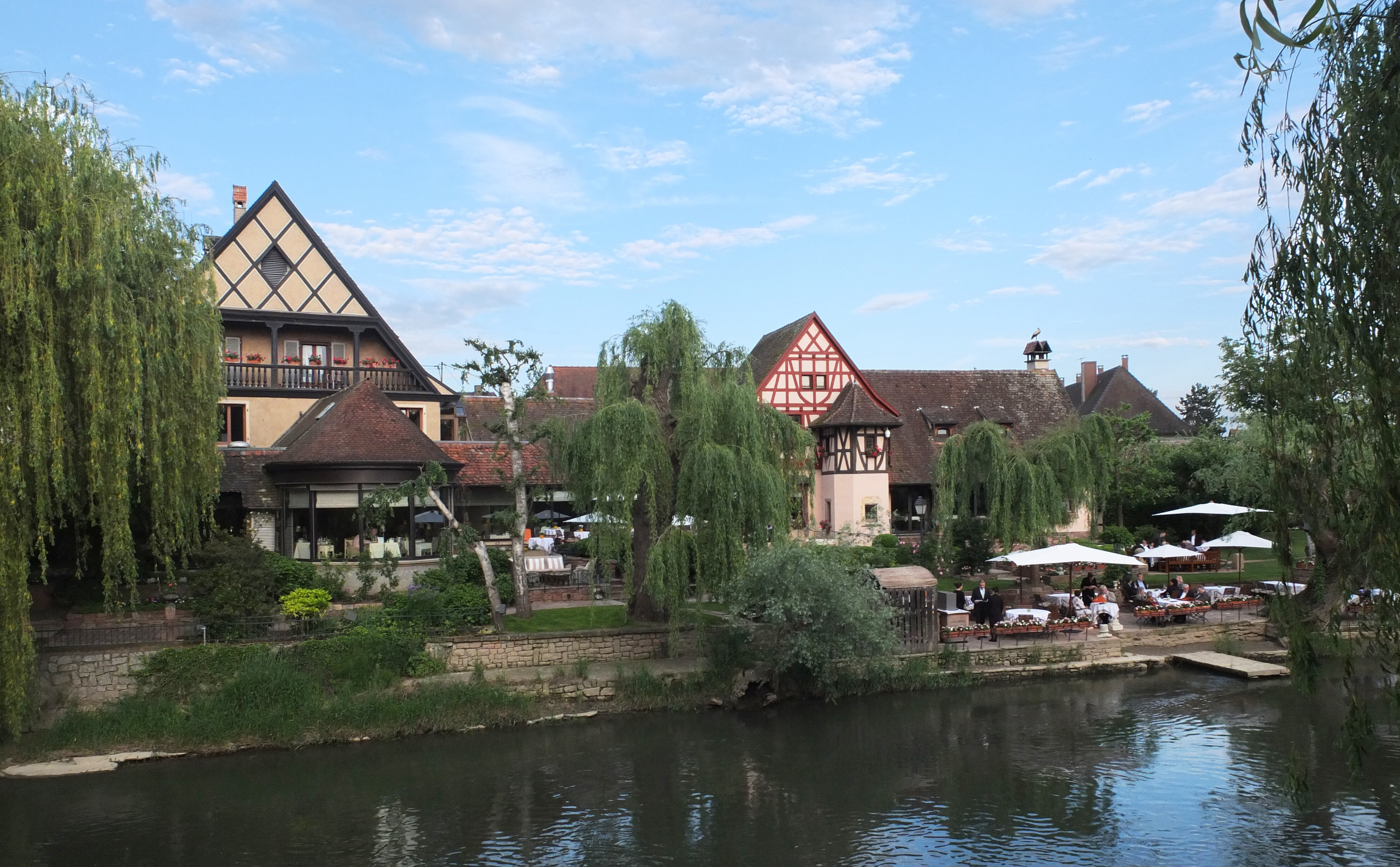
Auberge de l'Ill

Paul Haeberlin (24 November 1923 – 10 May 2008) was a French chef and restaurateur. He was the owner of Auberge de l'Ill, a classical French restaurant, which was first awarded a 3-star Michelin Rating in 1967 and continues to be one of the oldest 3-star establishments in France. His restaurant has served as a school for many of the world's premier French chefs, including Jean-Georges Vongerichten and Hubert Keller.

== Personal life ==
Haeberlin was born in the village of Illhaeusern in the Alsace region of France. In 1882 his grandparents (Frédéric, a farmer, and Frédérique, a cook) had bought a small inn and cafe in the town, called L’Arbre Vert. His father (another Frédéric, but known as Fritz) was born in 1888, and his mother (Marthe Oberlin) was a pastry cook. His brother, Jean-Pierre Haeberlin, was a decorative artist who oversaw operations of the restaurant with Paul. At the age of 14, Paul became an apprentice at the Hôtel de la Pépinière in Ribeauvillé, next moving to Paris where he worked in restaurants such as Poccardi and Rôtisserie Périgourdine.

Haeberlin had to give up cooking during World War II when he was drafted into the French army. Though he was able to discharge himself, he then went on to operate as a resistance fighter under Charles de Gaulle's Free French forces. His family's inn, L’Arbre Vert (the green tree) was destroyed in a bombing raid in 1945 near the end of the war. The family rebuilt it after World War II, renaming the restaurant Auberge de l’Ill.

In 1953 he married Marie Ittel, and they had two children (Marc and Danièle), both of whom work in the family restaurant. In 1976 his son took over the kitchen of Auberge de l’Ill, and in 2007 Paul Haeberlin fully retired.

== Cuisine ==
Haeberlin was known for his innovative new versions of traditional Alsace dishes. With the aim of "revolutioniz[ing] previous conceptions of French cuisine", it was Haeberlin's unique style which helped to define what would eventually become nouvelle cuisine. He received his first Michelin star in 1952, the second in 1957, and the maximum three in 1967. It has retained them ever since; an unbroken record bettered only by Paul Bocuse, who achieved his third star two years earlier.

== Death ==
Haeberlin died in Illhaeusern on 10 May 2008. According to Michel Scheer (manager of Auberge de l’Ill), he had been "suffering from kidney and heart disease, among other ailments".
