= Raymond Ruyer =

French philosopher

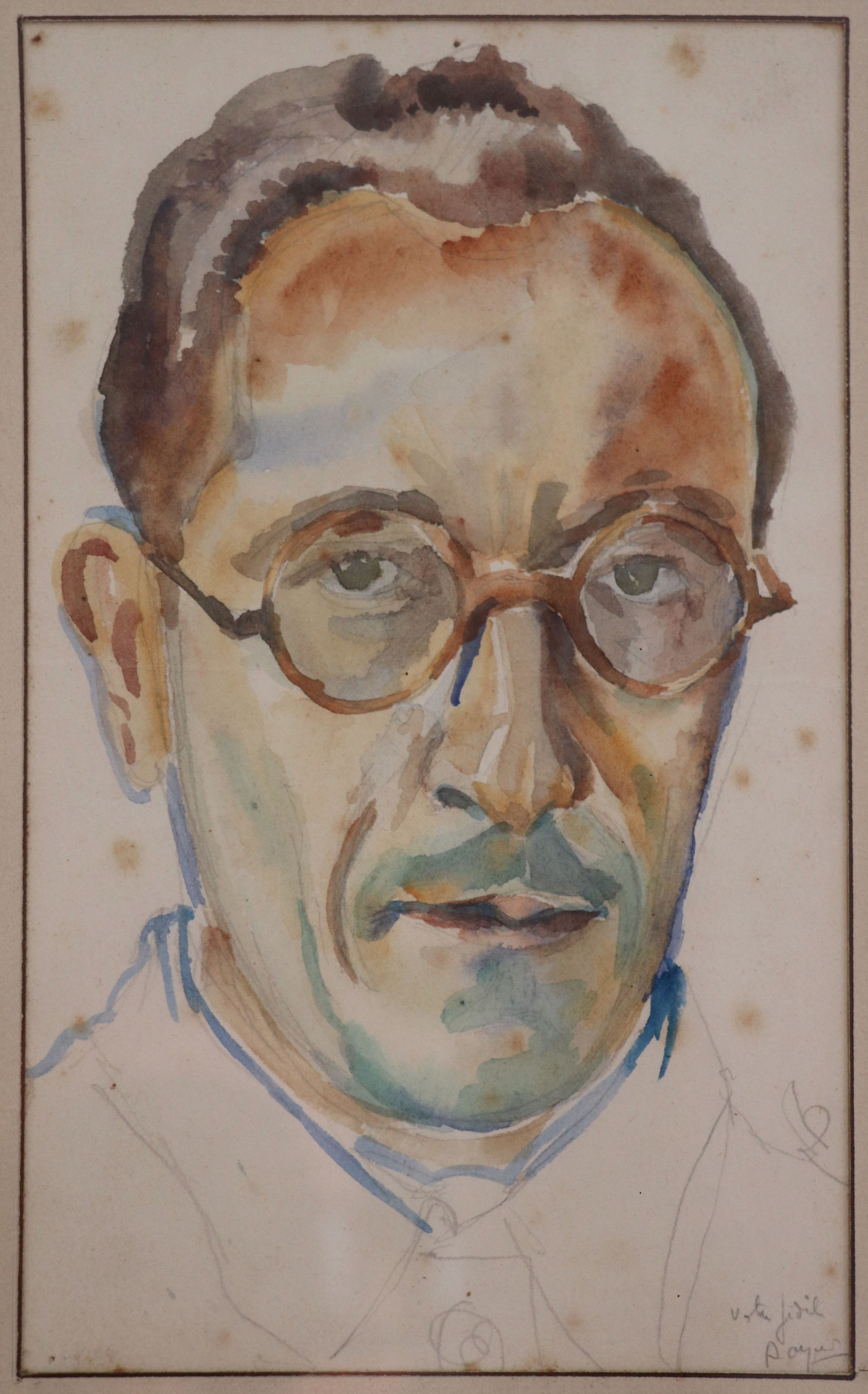
Raymond Ruyer

Raymond Ruyer (French: [ʁyje]; 13 January 1902 – 22 June 1987) was a French philosopher in the late 20th century. His work covered topics including the philosophy of biology, the philosophy of informatics, the philosophy of value and others. His most popular book is The Gnosis of Princeton in which he presents his own philosophical views under the pretence that he was representing the views of an imaginary group of American scientists.

He developed an account of panpsychism which was a major influence on philosophers such as Adolf Portmann, Gilbert Simondon, Gilles Deleuze and Félix Guattari.

== Life ==
Raymond Ruyer was born in 1902 in the village of Plainfaing department of Vosges, France. He studied at the École Normale Supérieure, passing the agrégation in philosophy with a thesis on the phenomenology of knowledge.

In 1937 he published his first book, The Body and the Conscience.

During World War II Raymond Ruyer was a prisoner of war in Germany from 1940 to 1944. Upon his return he was appointed professor of philosophy at the Université de Nancy, where he developed his theories of the philosophical implications of various branches of science, mainly embryology, biology and informatics. At the same time he continued his research on the theory of value which he had started before the war.

In the 1970s he was named corresponding member of the Institut de France. He was also offered a position at the Sorbonne which he declined, preferring to continue working in Nancy, where he was friends with many other scientists.

Being opposed to the existentialism and the leftist trends of the French post-war intelligentsia, Ruyer's work was better accepted in scientific circles abroad than in France. Publicist Raymond Aron advised him to try his luck at writing more popular works. His first such attempts did not raise public interest. Therefore, based on the assumption that the French public was more fascinated by scientific developments in America, Ruyer published the book The Gnosis of Princeton. He claimed to be in contact with a group of unidentified American gnostic philosophers who were trying to create a new religion identified as the Gnosis of Princeton, where most of these imaginary scientists were active. Thereafter Raymond Ruyer presented his own gnostic ideas. The book was a success as many of its readers were not aware of the hoax for a long time. However, his next publications did not raise interest in France, and were better known in Canada and the United States.

Raymond Ruyer died in 1987 in Nancy. His last work, "Embryogenesis of the World and the Silent God", was published only in 2013.

== Bibliography ==
(considered complete)

- Esquisse d'une philosophie de la structure – Alcan, Paris 1930.
- La conscience et le corps – Alcan, Paris 1937.
- Éléments de psycho-biologie – Presses Universitaires de France, Paris, 1946.
- Le monde des valeurs – Aubier, Paris, 1947.
- L'Utopie et les Utopies – Presses Universitaires de France, Paris, 1950.
- L’action à distance d’après la science contemporaine – Revue Métapsychique, 1951, n°16, 183–196.
- Néofinalisme – Presses Universitaires de France – Paris – 1952, new edition 2012.
- La philosophie de la valeur – Armand Colin, Paris, 1952.
- La cybernétique et l'origine de l'information – Flammarion, Paris 1954. Translated as Cybernetics and the Origin of Information, Rowman & Littlefield, 2024.
- La genèse des formes vivantes – Flammarion, Paris, 1958.
- Paradoxes de la conscience et limites de l'automatisme – Albin Michel, Paris 1960.
- L'animal, l'homme, la fonction symbolique – Gallimard, Paris, 1964.
- Éloge de la société de consommation – Calmann-Lévy, Paris, 1969.
- Dieu des religions, Dieu de la science – Flammarion, Paris 1970.
- Les nuisances idéologiques – Calmann-Lévy, Paris, 1972.
- La gnose de Princeton – Fayard, Paris, 1974.
- Les nourritures psychiques. La politique du bonheur – Calmann-Lévy, Paris, 1975.
- Les cent prochains siècles – Fayard, Paris, 1977.
- Homère au féminin ou La jeune femme auteur de l'Odyssée – Copernic, Paris 1977.
- L'art d'être toujours content. Introduction à la vie gnostique – Fayard, Paris, 1978.
- Le sceptique résolu – Robert Laffont, Paris, 1979.
- Souvenirs −1- Ma famille alsacienne et ma vallée vosgienne – Vent d'Est, Paris 1985.
- L’embryogenèse du monde et le Dieu silencieux – Klincksieck, Paris, 2013 (posthumous).

== Sources ==
- Laurent Meslet – La philosophie biologique de Raymond Ruyer – 1997 (ISBN 978-2-284-00489-9)
- Laurent Meslet – Le psychisme et la vie – Harmattan, 2005 (ISBN 274758688X)
- Raymond Ruyer, de la science à la théologie, collectif sous la direction de Louis Vax et Jean-Jacques Wunenburger Editions Kimé, 1995.
- Fabrice Colonna – Ruyer Les Belles Lettres, Paris, 2007 (ISBN 2251760563)
- Fabrice Colonna, Georges Chapouthier (sous la direction de), Dossier "Raymond Ruyer : l’appel des sciences", avec des textes de Raymond Ruyer, Georges Chapouthier, Fabrice Colonna, André Conrad, Denis Forest, Revue Philosophique de la France et de l'Etranger, 2013, N°1, pp 3–70.
- Sylvie Leclerc-Reynaud – Pour une documentation créative, l'apport de la philosophie de Raymond Ruyer – Coll. Science et techniques de l'information, 2007 (ISBN 2843650852)
- Raymond Ruyer – Biographie
