= Lac Vert (Vosges) =

Lake in Haut-Rhin, France

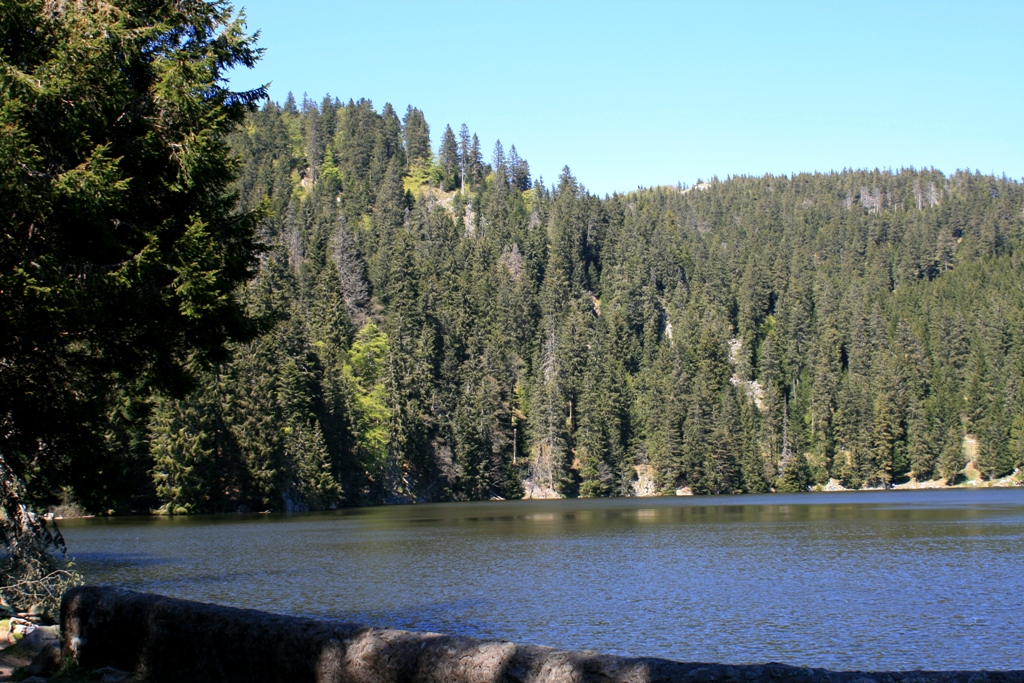

- Location within France
- Location: Haut-Rhin
- Coordinates: 48.088333°N 7.064444°E
- Type: glacial
- Catchment area: 1 km^{2} (0.39 sq mi)
- Basin countries: France
- Surface area: 0.072 km^{2} (0.028 sq mi)
- Max. depth: 17 m (56 ft)
- Surface elevation: 1,044 m (3,425 ft)

Lac Vert is a lake in Haut-Rhin, France. At an elevation of 1044 m, its surface area is 0.072 km².
