= Fischboedle =

Body of water

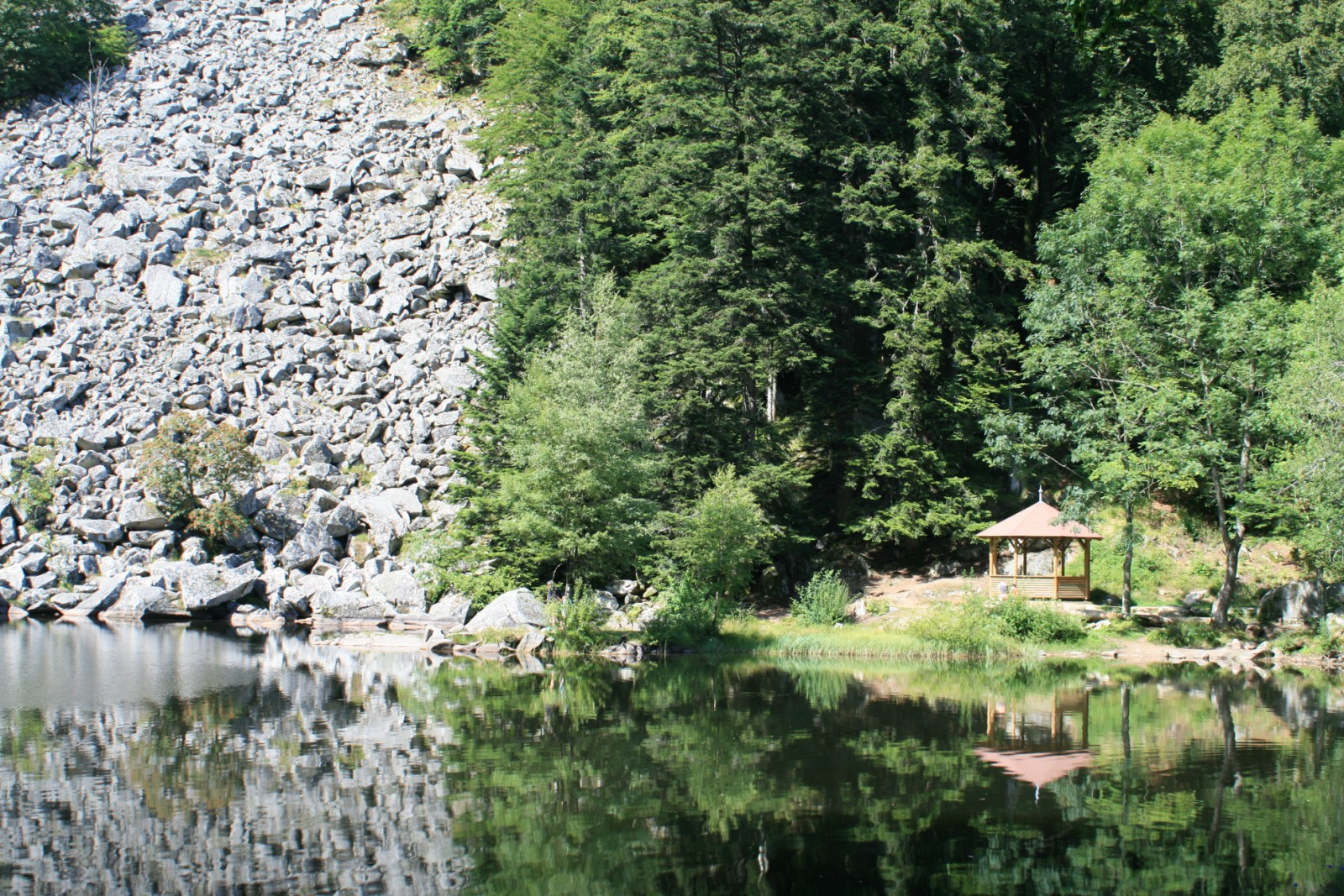

- Location within France
- Location: Haut-Rhin
- Coordinates: 48°01′24″N 7°1′22″E
- Type: glacial
- Primary inflows: Wormsabachrunz
- Primary outflows: Wormsabachrunz
- Basin countries: France
- Surface area: 0.0005 km^{2} (0.00019 sq mi)
- Surface elevation: 794 m (2,605 ft)

Fischboedle is a shallow lake in Haut-Rhin, France, in the commune of Metzeral. At an elevation of 794 m, it has a surface area of 0.0005 km². The depth of the lake varies but it is estimated that it is no deeper than 4 m (2.2 fathoms; 13 ft). It is the smallest lake in the Vosges mountains.

== Location ==
The lake lies in the Wormsa Valley near the foot of Hohneck and the Kastelberg. It is crossed by the Wormsabachrunz, which flows into the Wormsabach. Near the lake is the Cascade de la Wormsa.

Fischboedle can be reached on foot from a number of different locations such as Mittlach, it lies on the Sentier de la Wormsa (which is near a part of GR 5). It is near Schiessrothried from where it can be reached on foot. It cannot be reached by vehicles.

Beside the lake is a small shelter called La gloriette du Fischboedle, which was built by Club Vosgien.

== Name ==
The name is German in origin and is probably derived from the use by Jacques Hartmann, who used it as a reservation for trout (fisch is German for fish and bödle, ö is often spelled or changed to oe, is German for bog).

== Fish ==
The lake contains a number of varieties of trout (namely brook trout and river trout) making it a popular spot for anglers who are willing to make the hike.
