= Illhaeusern =

Commune in Grand Est, France

- Commune
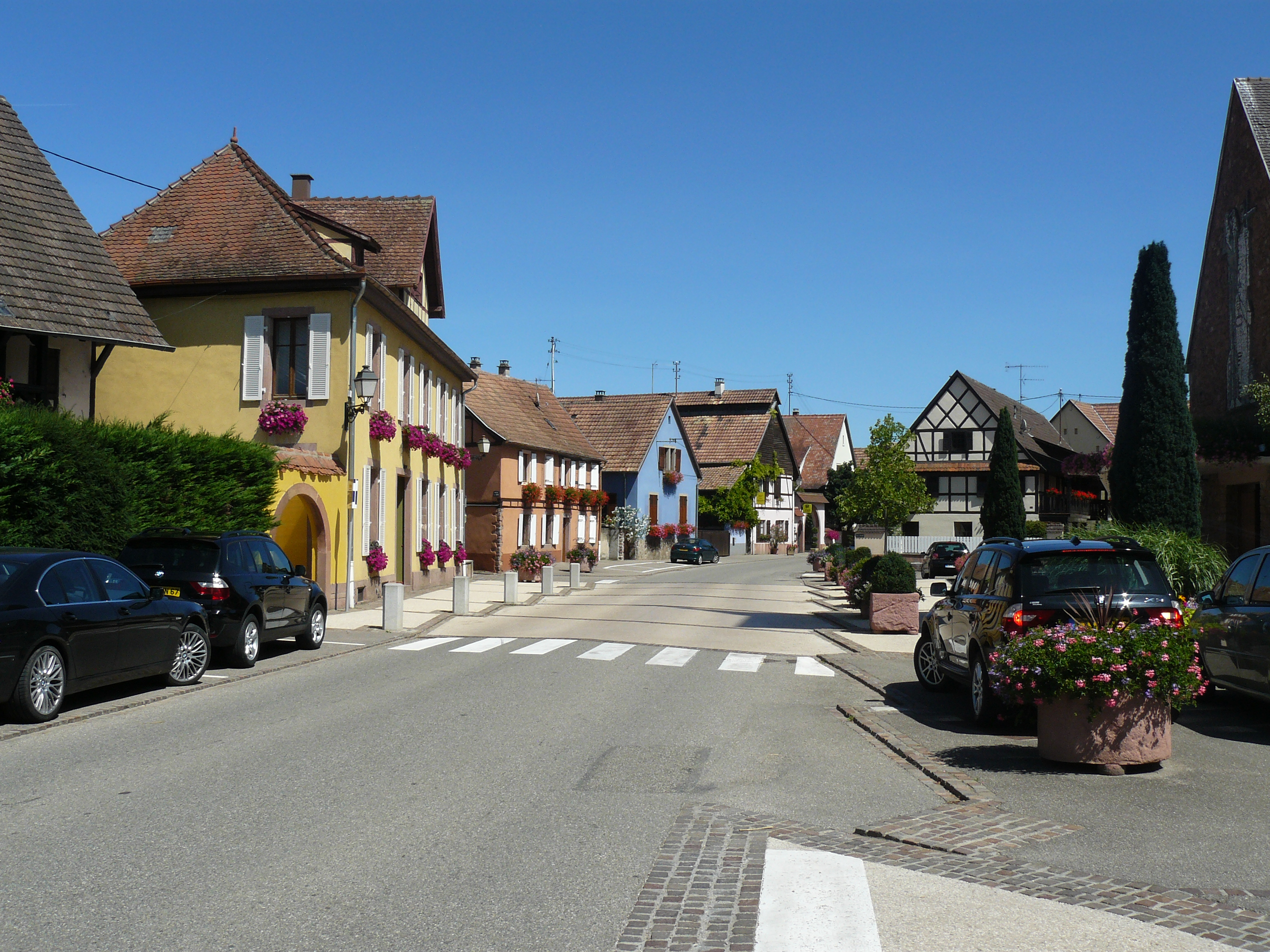
- A view within Illhaeusern

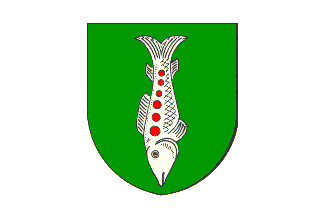
- Flag Coat of arms
- Location of Illhaeusern
- Location within France Location within Grand Est
- Coordinates: 48°11′06″N 7°26′08″E
- Country: France
- Region: Grand Est
- Department: Haut-Rhin
- Arrondissement: Colmar-Ribeauvillé
- Canton: Sainte-Marie-aux-Mines
- Intercommunality: Pays de Ribeauvillé

Government
  - Mayor (2020–2026): Jean-Claude Hirn
- Area^{1}: 10.46 km^{2} (4.04 sq mi)
- Highest elevation: 179 m (587 ft)
- Lowest elevation: 172 m (564 ft)
- Population (2023): 717
  - Density: 68.5/km^{2} (178/sq mi)
- Time zone: UTC+01:00 (CET)
  - Summer (DST): UTC+02:00 (CEST)
- INSEE/Postal code: 68153 /68970
- ^{1} French Land Register data, which excludes lakes, ponds, glaciers > 1 km^{2} (0.386 sq mi or 247 acres) and river estuaries.

Illhaeusern (French pronunciation: [ilœjzəʁn]; German: Illhäusern) is a commune in the Haut-Rhin department in Grand Est in north-eastern France.

The village stands at the confluence of the rivers Ill and Fecht. Its name means "houses near the river Ill".

Illhaeusern is famous for the Auberge de l'Ill, still one of the oldest 2-star establishments in France. It was managed until 2008 by Paul Haeberlin, his son Marc took over after his death.

== See also ==
- Communes of the Haut-Rhin département
