= Soultzeren =

Commune in Grand Est, France

- Commune
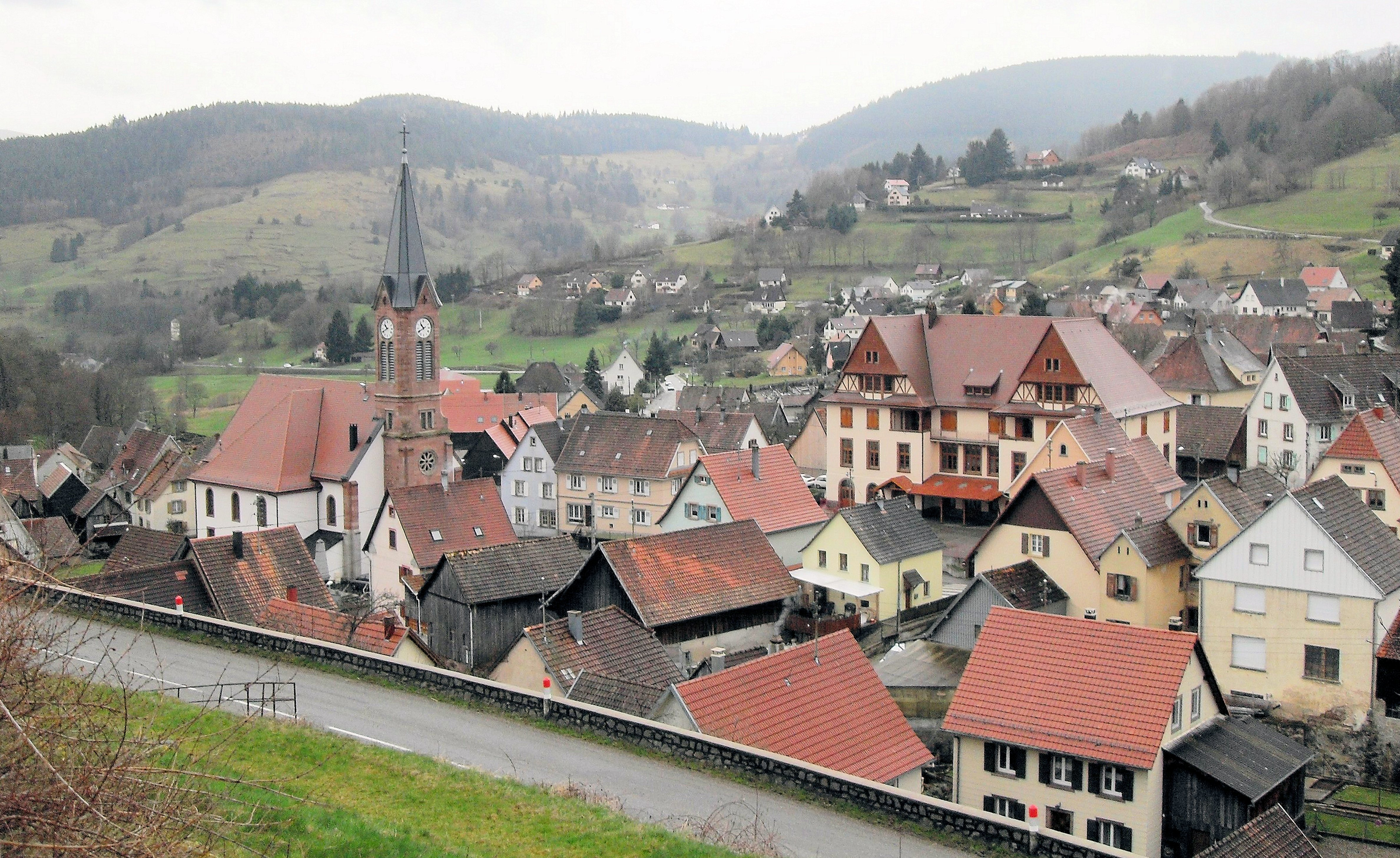
- A general view of Soultzeren

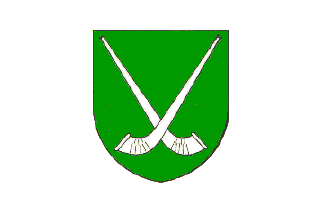
- Flag Coat of arms
- Location of Soultzeren
- Location within France Location within Grand Est
- Coordinates: 48°03′47″N 7°06′12″E
- Country: France
- Region: Grand Est
- Department: Haut-Rhin
- Arrondissement: Colmar-Ribeauvillé
- Canton: Wintzenheim
- Intercommunality: Vallée de Munster

Government
  - Mayor (2020–2026): Philippe Breschbühl
- Area^{1}: 18.37 km^{2} (7.09 sq mi)
- Elevation: 543 m (1,781 ft)
- Highest elevation: 1,303 m (4,275 ft)
- Lowest elevation: 464 m (1,522 ft)
- Population (2023): 1,183
  - Density: 64.40/km^{2} (166.8/sq mi)
- Time zone: UTC+01:00 (CET)
  - Summer (DST): UTC+02:00 (CEST)
- INSEE/Postal code: 68317 /68140
- ^{1} French Land Register data, which excludes lakes, ponds, glaciers > 1 km^{2} (0.386 sq mi or 247 acres) and river estuaries.

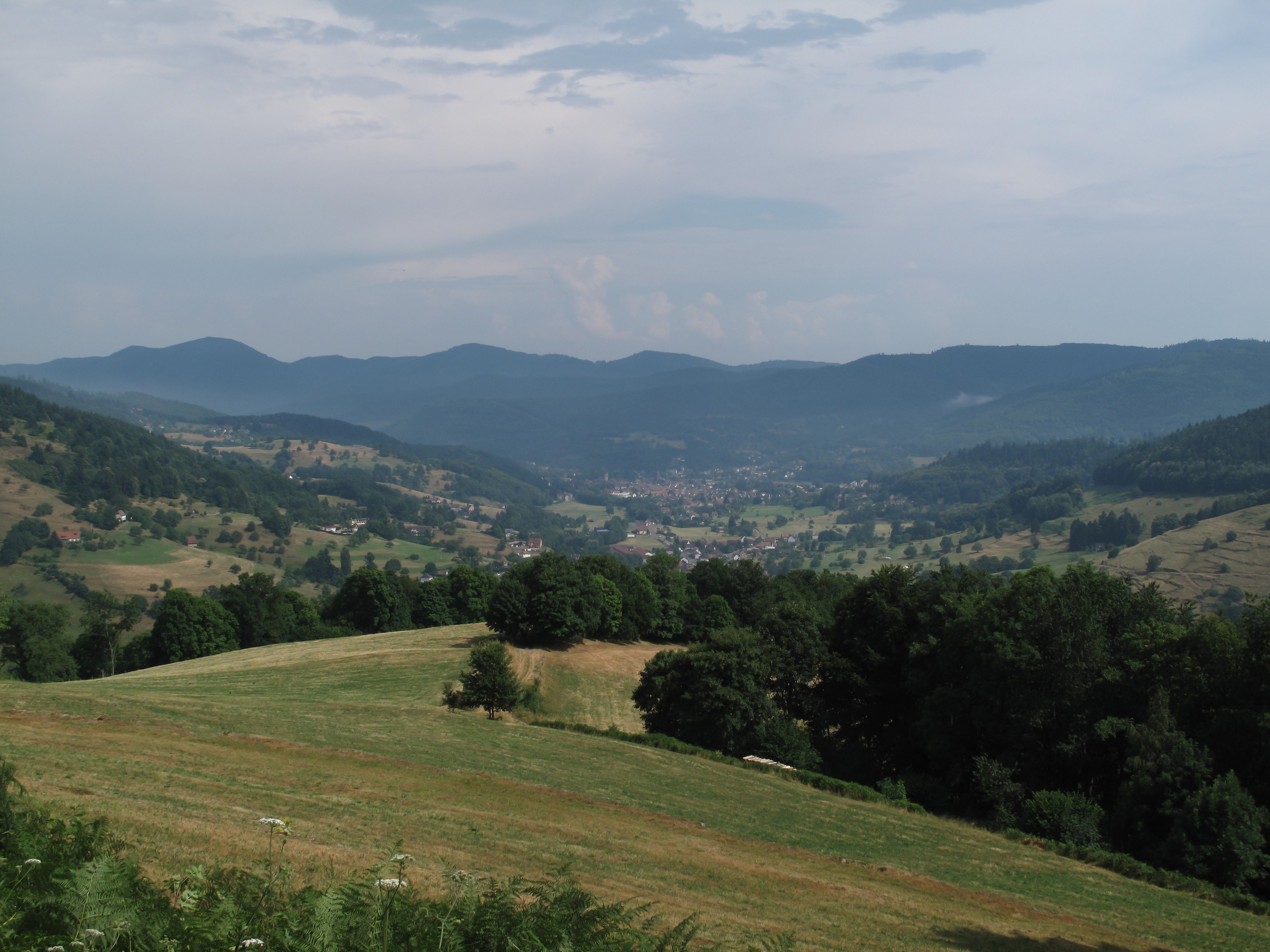
Soultzeren, view to the village

Soultzeren (German: Sulzern) is a commune in the Haut-Rhin department in Grand Est in north-eastern France.

== See also ==
- Communes of the Haut-Rhin department
- Lac des Truites
