= Lac Blanc (Vosges) =

Lake in Haut-Rhin, France

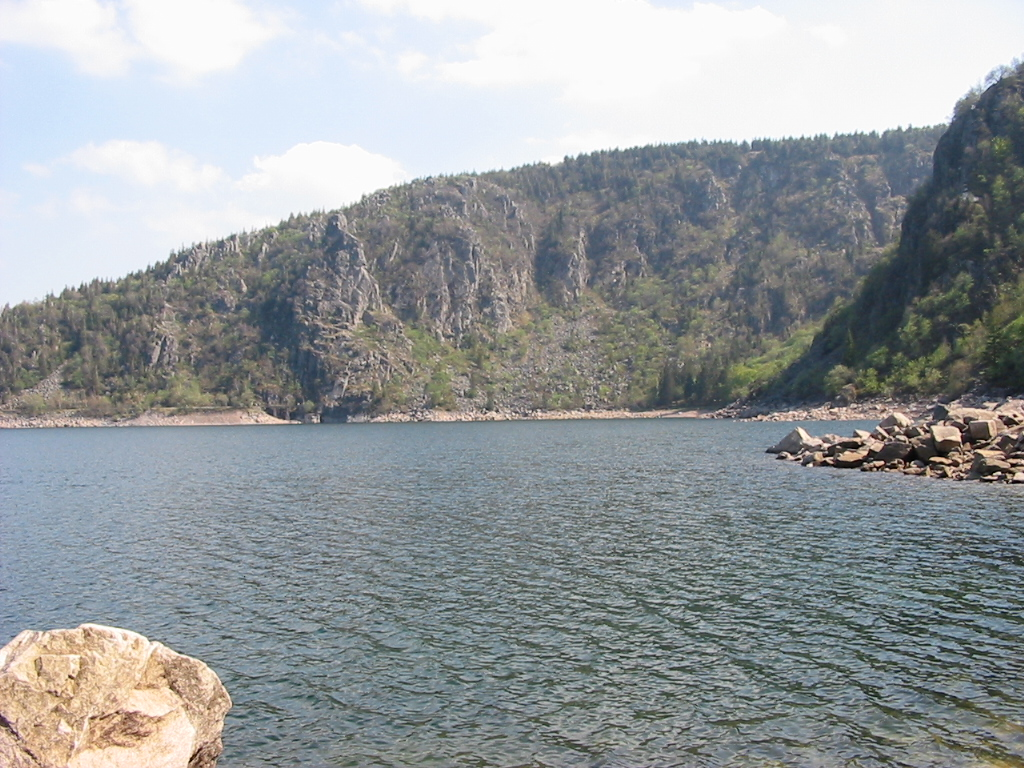

- Location within France
- Location: Haut-Rhin
- Coordinates: 48.124444°N 7.094444°E
- Primary outflows: Weiss
- Basin countries: France
- Surface area: 0.29 km^{2} (0.11 sq mi)
- Max. depth: 72 m (236 ft)
- Surface elevation: 1,055 m (3,461 ft)

Lac Blanc is a lake in Haut-Rhin, France. At an elevation of 1055 m, its surface area is 0.29 km².
