= Munster, Haut-Rhin =

Commune in Grand Est, France

Munster
- Commune
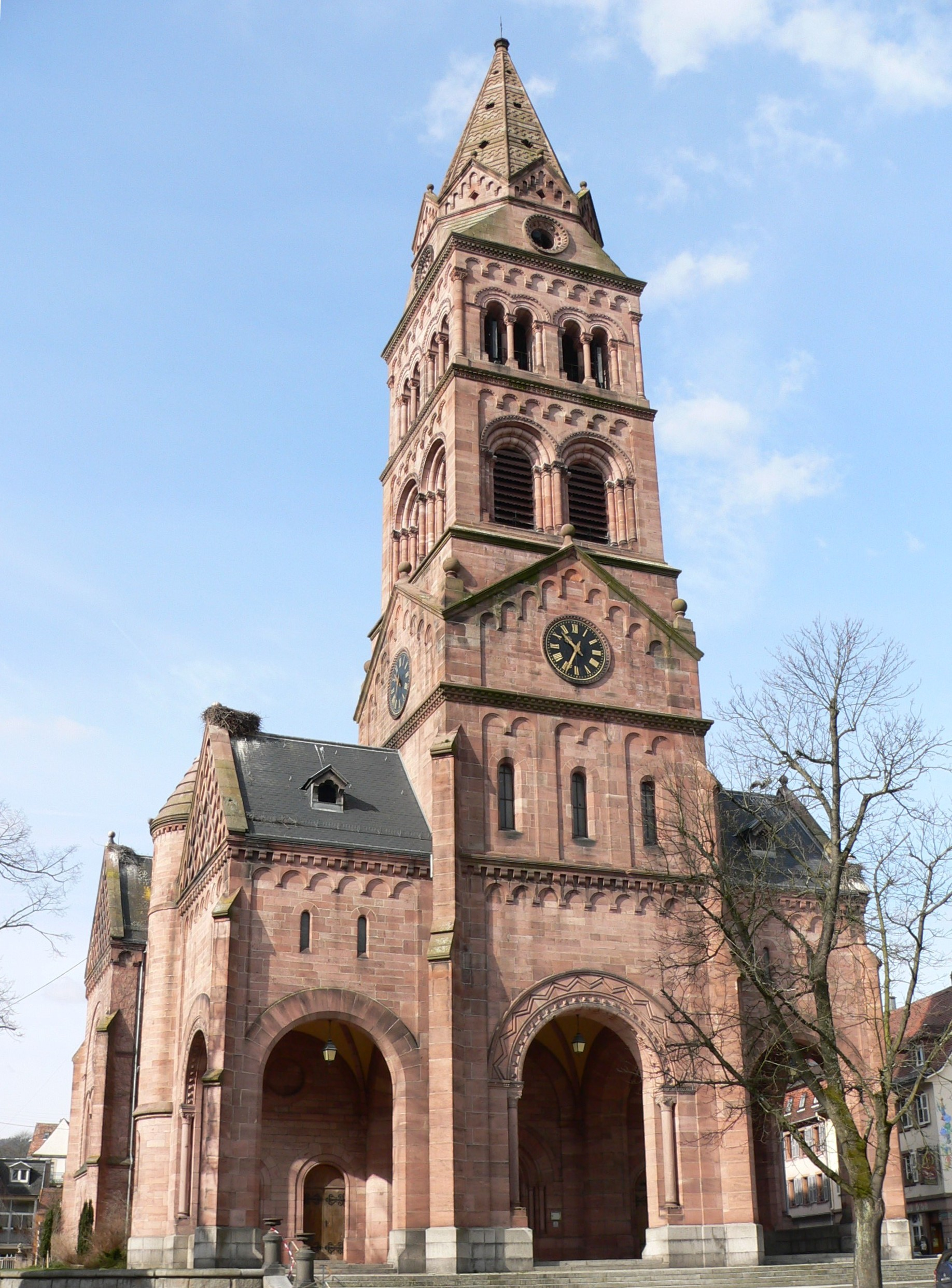
- Protestant Church

- Coat of arms
- Location of Munster
- Location within France Location within Grand Est
- Coordinates: 48°02′N 7°08′E
- Country: France
- Region: Grand Est
- Department: Haut-Rhin
- Arrondissement: Colmar-Ribeauvillé
- Canton: Wintzenheim
- Intercommunality: Vallée de Munster

Government
  - Mayor (2020–2026): Pierre Dischinger
- Area^{1}: 8.64 km^{2} (3.34 sq mi)
- Elevation: 380 m (1,250 ft)
- Highest elevation: 794 m (2,605 ft)
- Lowest elevation: 341 m (1,119 ft)
- Population (2023): 4,738
  - Density: 548/km^{2} (1,420/sq mi)
- Time zone: UTC+01:00 (CET)
  - Summer (DST): UTC+02:00 (CEST)
- INSEE/Postal code: 68226 /68140
- ^{1} French Land Register data, which excludes lakes, ponds, glaciers > 1 km^{2} (0.386 sq mi or 247 acres) and river estuaries.

Munster (French pronunciation: [mœ̃stɛʁ]; German: Münster im Elsass) is a commune in the Haut-Rhin department in Grand Est in north-eastern France. It is located in the valley of the river Fecht, in the Vosges mountains about 15 kilometres (9.3 miles) west of Colmar on the D417 road to the Col de la Schlucht and Épinal.

The site of a 7th-century abbey or monastery, which gave the place its name, it is famous for its cheese (the Munster cheese).

== Population ==
Historical population
| Year | Pop. | ±% p.a. |
|---|---|---|
| 1968 | 4,888 | — |
| 1975 | 4,932 | +0.13% |
| 1982 | 4,661 | −0.80% |
| 1990 | 4,657 | −0.01% |
| 1999 | 4,884 | +0.53% |
| 2007 | 4,990 | +0.27% |
| 2012 | 4,791 | −0.81% |
| 2017 | 4,606 | −0.78% |
| 2023 | 4,738 | +0.47% |
Source: INSEE

The town's inhabitants are known in French as munstériens.

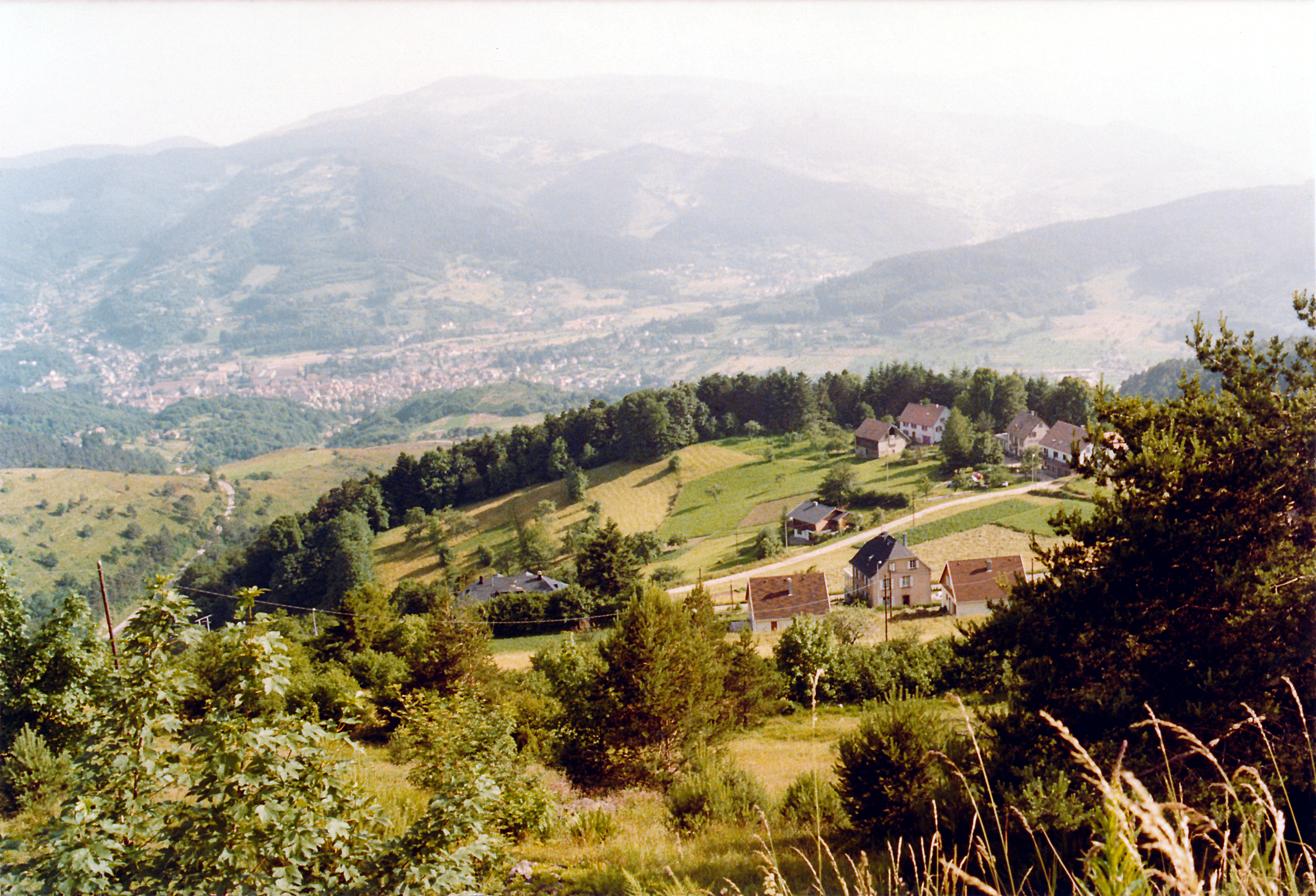
Panorama of the valley.

== People ==
- Albert Schweitzer grew up in the nearby village of Gunsbach in the late 19th century, when the region was known as Elsaß-Lothringen (Alsace-Lorraine) and was part of the German Empire. The village is home to the international Albert Schweitzer association AISL (Association Internationale Schweitzer Lambaréné).
- Dom George Franck (c.1690 – 1760) organist and composer was born in Munster.
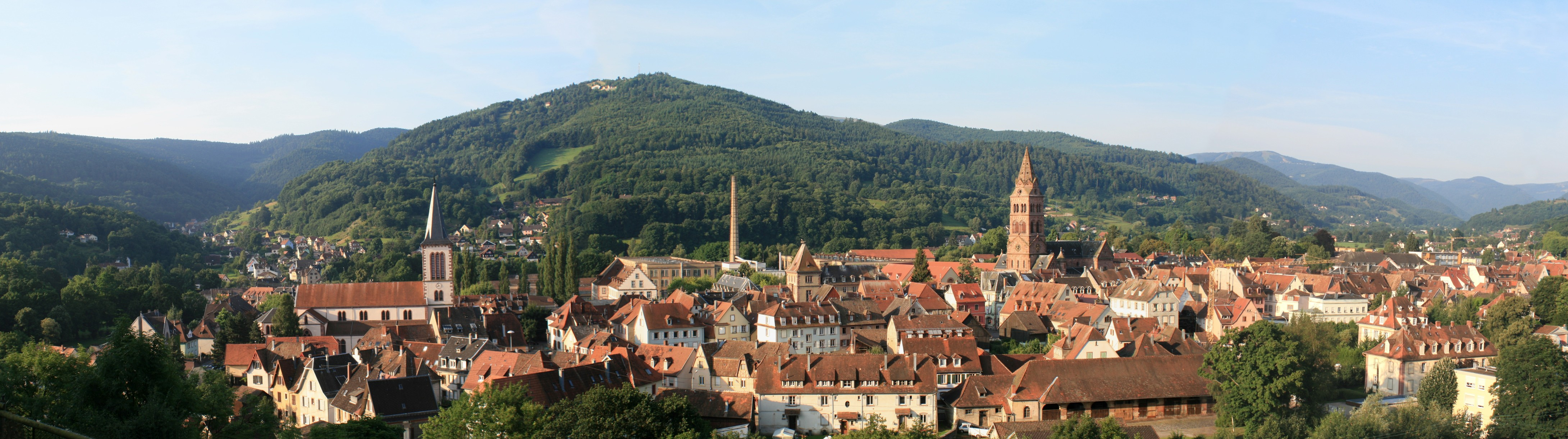
Panorama of Munster
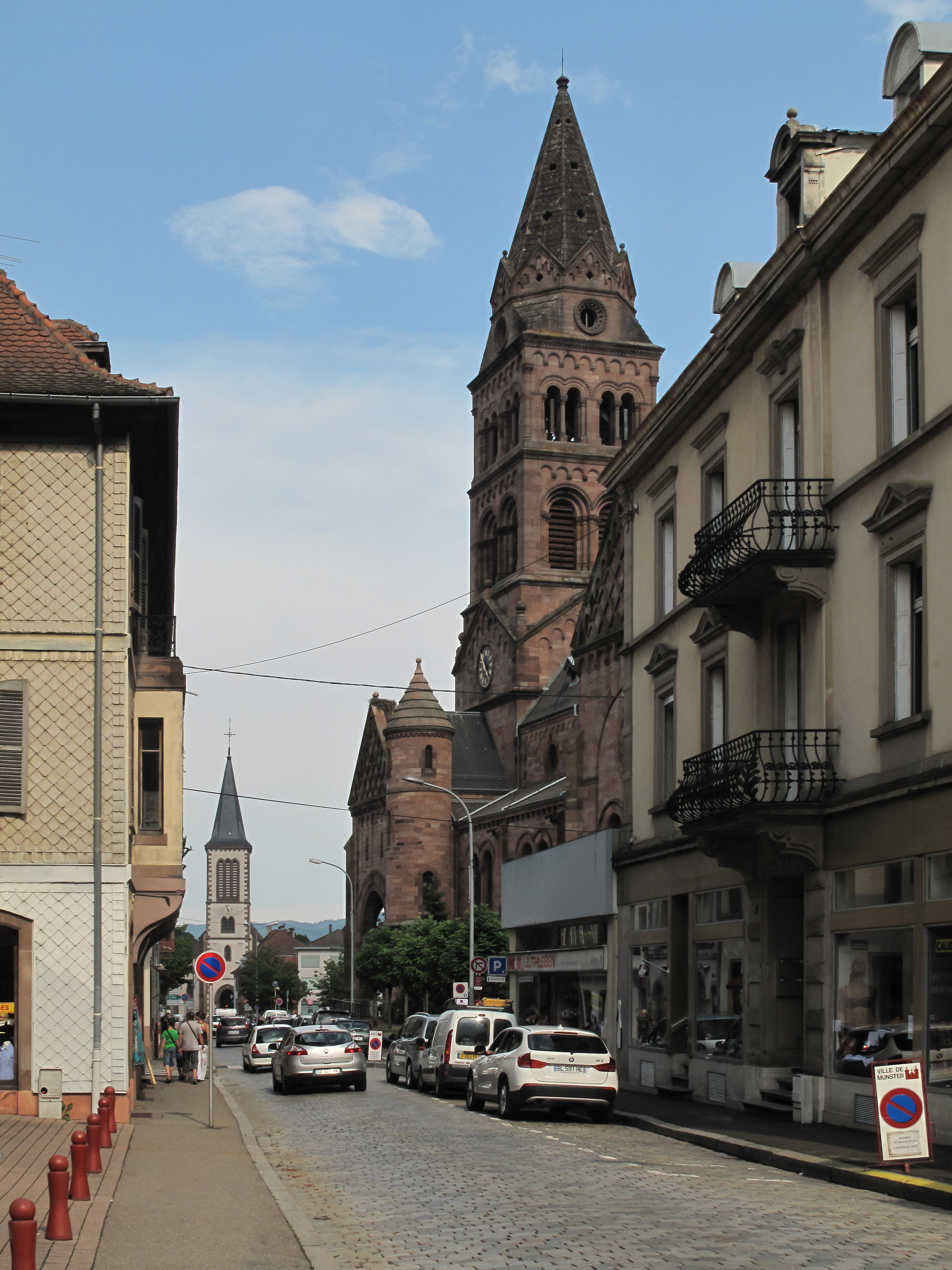
View to a street with reformed church and catholic church in the background

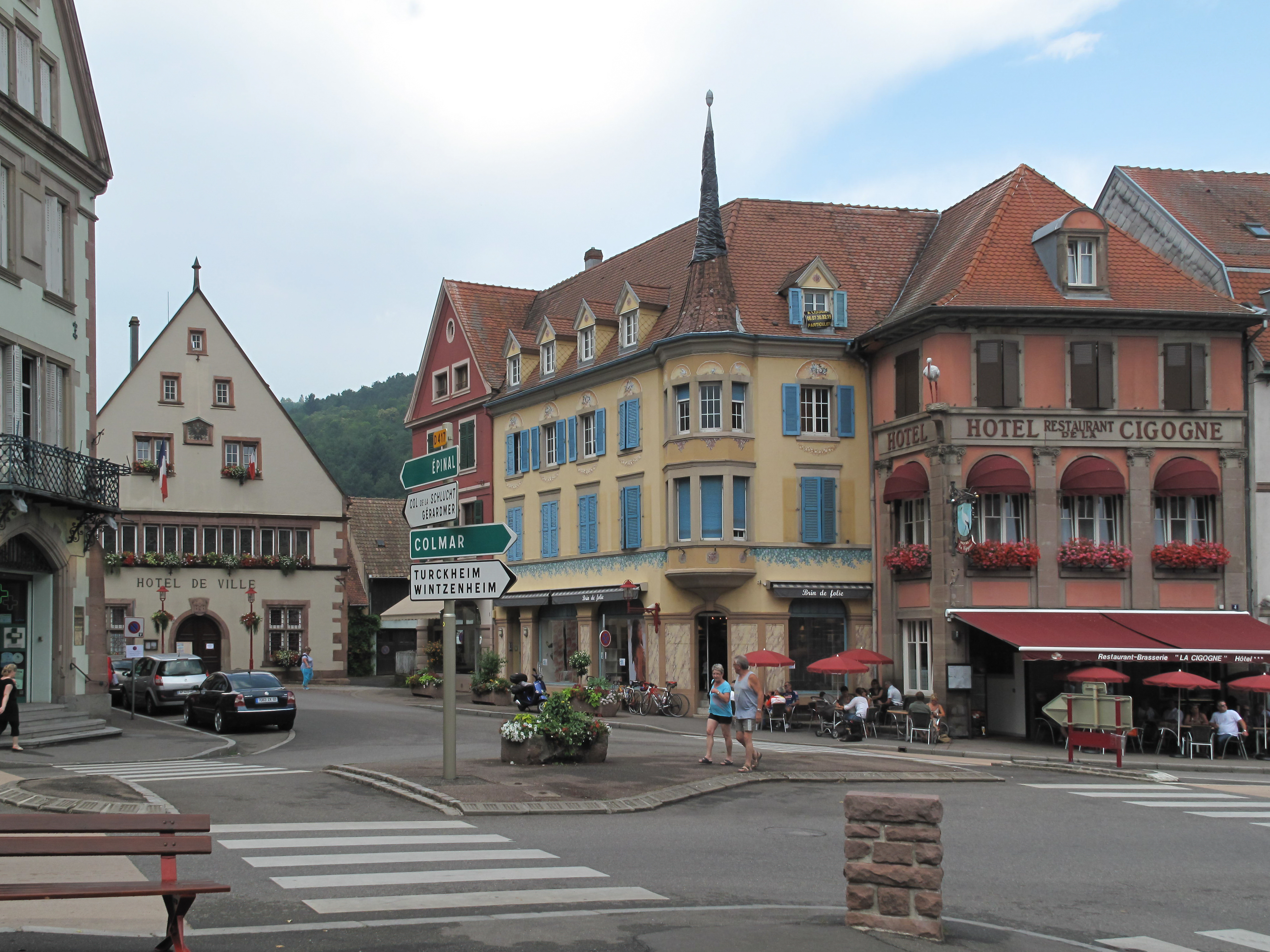
View to a street: Place du Marché-rue Saint-Gregoire-Grand Rue with townhall

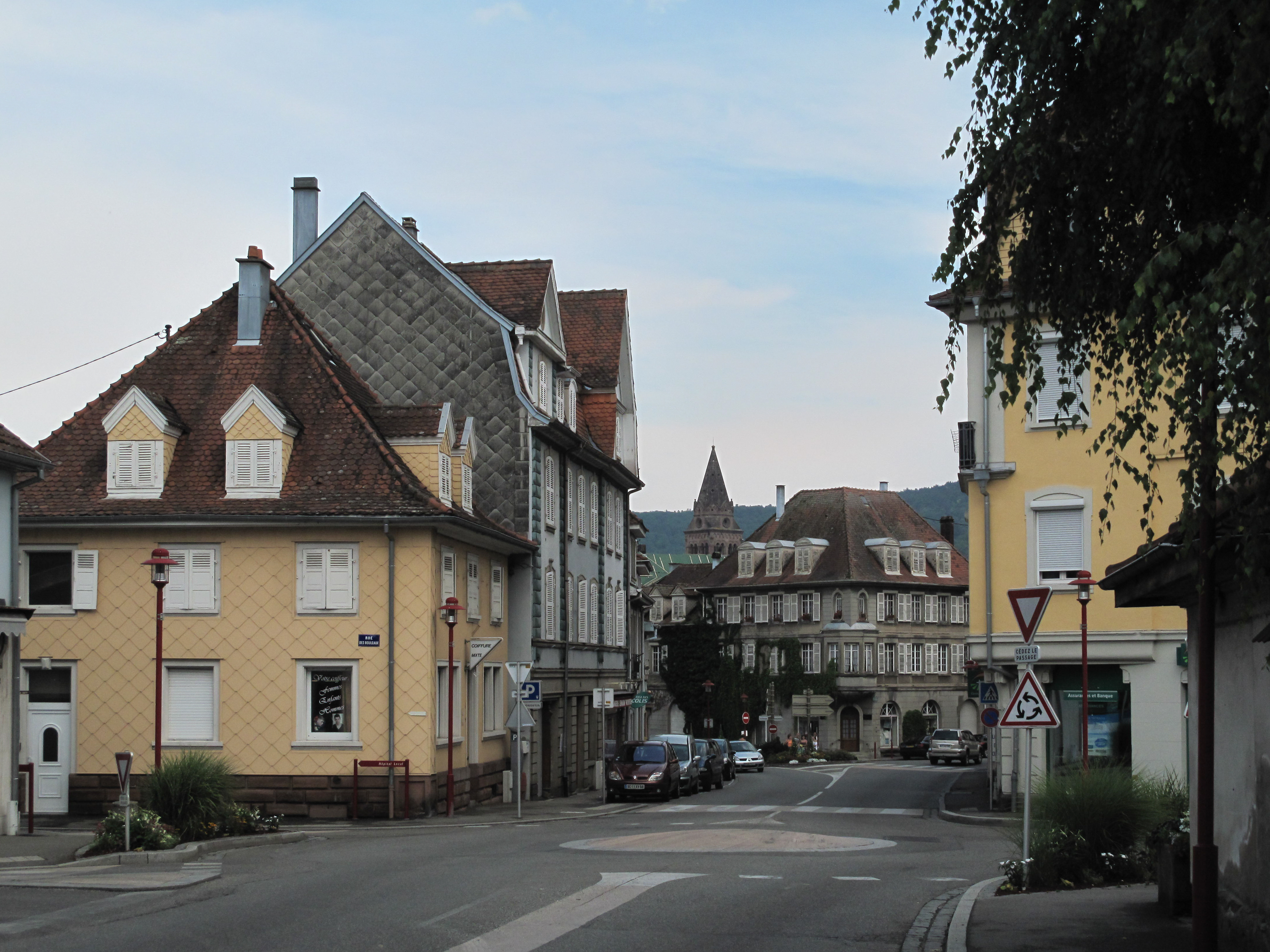
View to a street: Rue du 9e Zouaves

== See also ==
- Communes of the Haut-Rhin département
- Munster cheese
