= Le Valtin =

- Commune
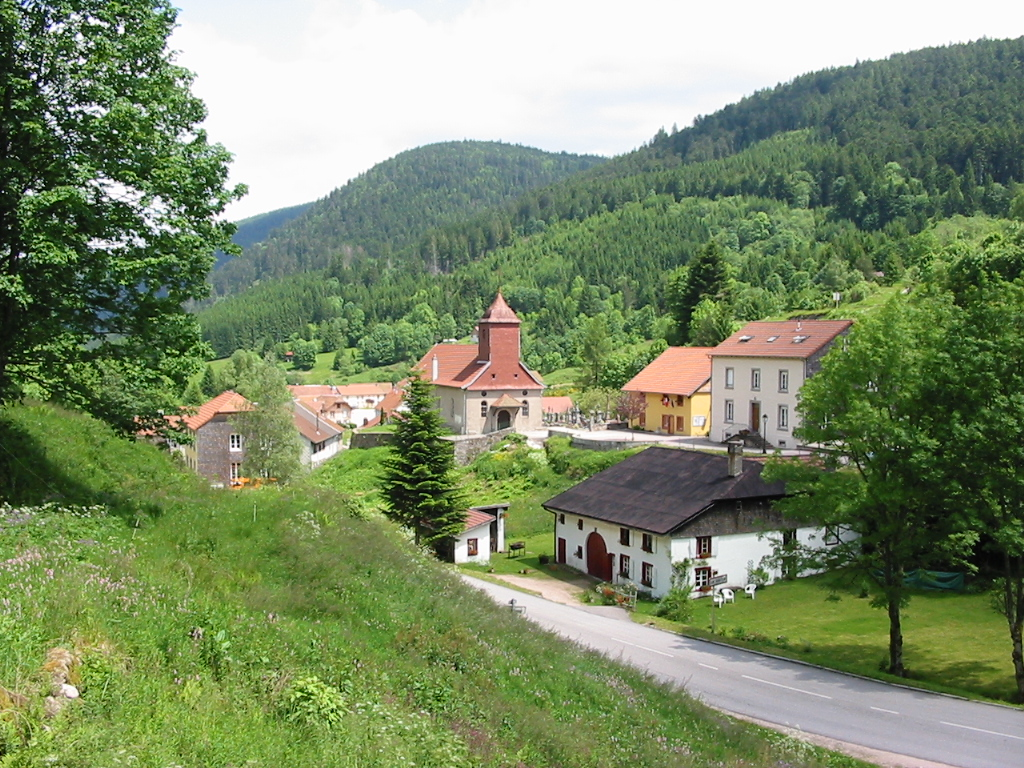
- A general view of Le Valtin

- Coat of arms
- Location of Le Valtin
- Location within France Location within Grand Est
- Coordinates: 48°05′56″N 7°01′28″E
- Country: France
- Region: Grand Est
- Department: Vosges
- Arrondissement: Saint-Dié-des-Vosges
- Canton: Gérardmer
- Intercommunality: CC Gérardmer Hautes Vosges

Government
  - Mayor (2020–2026): John Voinson
- Area^{1}: 19.64 km^{2} (7.58 sq mi)
- Elevation: 751 m (2,464 ft)
- Highest elevation: 1,304 m (4,278 ft)
- Lowest elevation: 704 m (2,310 ft)
- Population (2023): 74
  - Density: 3.8/km^{2} (9.8/sq mi)
- Time zone: UTC+01:00 (CET)
  - Summer (DST): UTC+02:00 (CEST)
- INSEE/Postal code: 88492 /88230
- ^{1} French Land Register data, which excludes lakes, ponds, glaciers > 1 km^{2} (0.386 sq mi or 247 acres) and river estuaries.

Le Valtin (French pronunciation: [lə valtɛ̃]) is a commune in the Vosges department in Grand Est in northeastern France.

== See also ==
- Communes of the Vosges department
