= Orbey =

Commune in Grand Est, France

- Commune
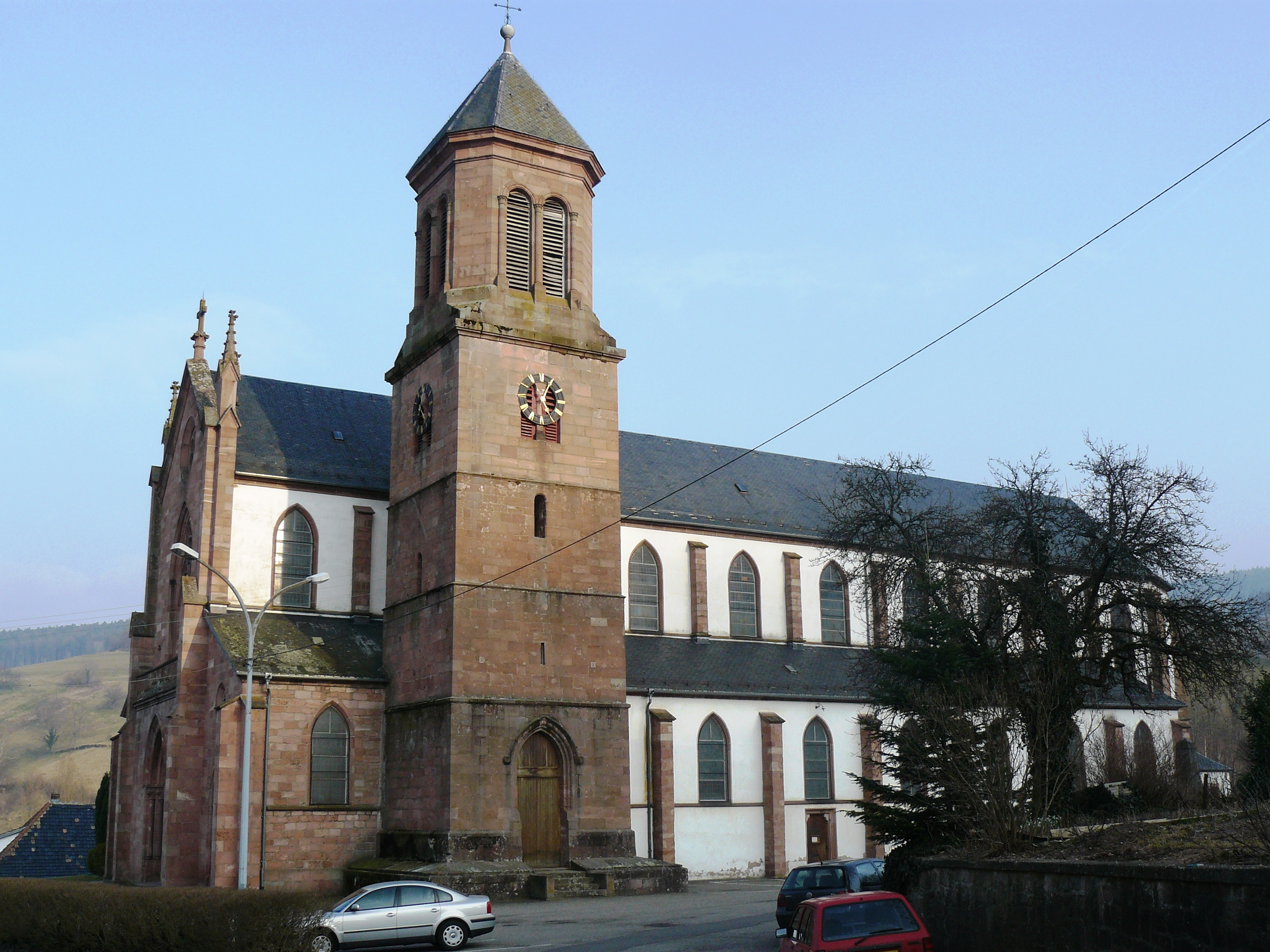
- Church of St. Urban

- Coat of arms
- Location of Orbey
- Location within France Location within Grand Est
- Coordinates: 48°07′38″N 7°09′42″E
- Country: France
- Region: Grand Est
- Department: Haut-Rhin
- Arrondissement: Colmar-Ribeauvillé
- Canton: Sainte-Marie-aux-Mines
- Intercommunality: Vallée de Kaysersberg

Government
  - Mayor (2020–2026): Guy Jacquey
- Area^{1}: 46.02 km^{2} (17.77 sq mi)
- Elevation: 500 m (1,600 ft)
- Highest elevation: 1,301 m (4,268 ft)
- Lowest elevation: 397 m (1,302 ft)
- Population (2023): 3,429
  - Density: 74.51/km^{2} (193.0/sq mi)
- Time zone: UTC+01:00 (CET)
  - Summer (DST): UTC+02:00 (CEST)
- INSEE/Postal code: 68249 /68370
- ^{1} French Land Register data, which excludes lakes, ponds, glaciers > 1 km^{2} (0.386 sq mi or 247 acres) and river estuaries.

Orbey (French pronunciation: [ɔʁbɛ]; German: Urbeis; Alsatian: Urwes) is a commune in the Haut-Rhin department in Grand Est in north-eastern France.

== Population ==
Historical population
Year	Pop.	±% p.a.
1968	3,236	—
1975	3,369	+0.58%
1982	3,114	−1.12%
1990	3,282	+0.66%
1999	3,548	+0.87%
2007	3,631	+0.29%
2012	3,647	+0.09%
2017	3,552	−0.53%
2023	3,429	−0.59%
Source: INSEE

== See also ==
- Communes of the Haut-Rhin department
