= Clément Cogitore =

French artist and filmmaker (born 1983)

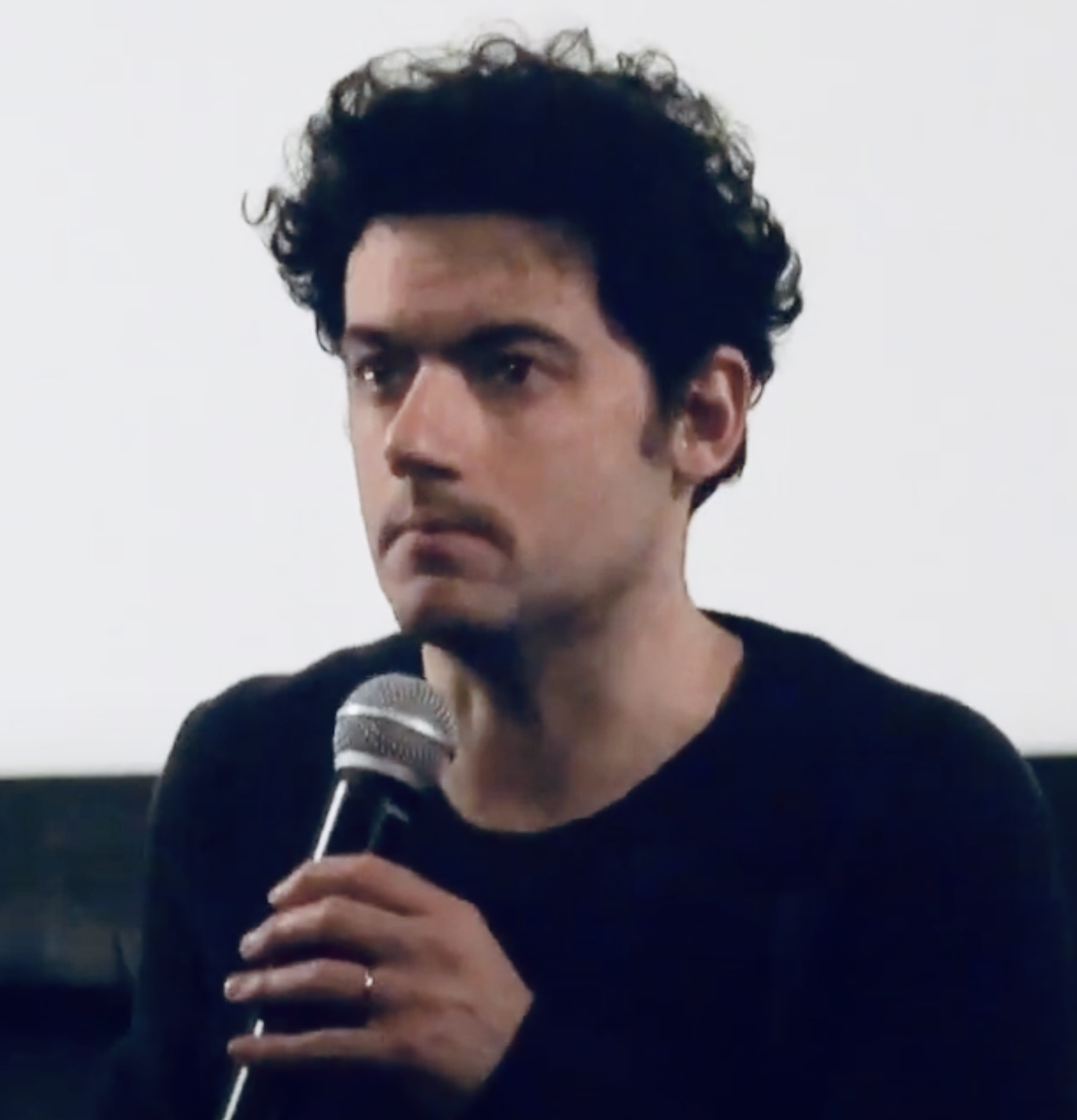
- Born: 27 August 1983 (age 42); Colmar, France
- Known for: Contemporary artist and filmmaker
- Relatives: Romain Cogitore (brother)
- Website: clementcogitore.com

Clément Cogitore (born 27 August 1983) is a French contemporary artist and filmmaker. Combining film, video, installations and photographs, Cogitore questions the modalities of cohabitation between humankind and its own images and representations.

== Early life and studies ==
Clément Cogitore grew up in Lapoutroie, in eastern France (Upper Rhine). Studying in Strasbourg at the Academy of Applied Arts and then at Le Fresnoy - Studio national des arts contemporains (French National Studio of Contemporary Art), Clément Cogitore developed his artistic practice at the crossroads of contemporary art and cinema.

His brother, Romain Cogitore, is also a film director.

== Career ==
Since 2011, Cogitore’s work has been screened and exhibited at the Palais de Tokyo, MADRE (Naples), Centre Georges Pompidou (Paris), Institute of Contemporary Arts (London), Haus der Kulturen der Welt (Berlin), MACRO (Rome), Museum of Fine Arts (Boston), MoMA (New-York), MNBA (Québec), SeMA Bunker (Seoul), Kunsthaus Baselland (Basel), Red Brick Art Museum (Beijing), Rockbund Museum (Pékin), Hirschhorn Museum and Sculpture Garden (Washington), MUDAM (Luxembourg), and biennials such as the Lyon Biennial (France), the Berlin Biennial (Germany) and the Yokohama Triennial, Japan.

In 2010, his short movie Parmi nous (Among us) was awarded the Grand Prize of the European First Film Award (Vevey). That same year his documentary movie Bielutine was selected for Cannes' Directors' Fortnight. In 2011 Cogitore was awarded the Grand Prize of Salon de Montrouge for contemporary art and the following year he became resident of the Villa Medici, French Academy in Rome.

In 2015, his first feature film The Wakhan Front was selected at the Cannes international film festival – Critic’s week, awarded by the Gan Foundation acclaimed by critics and nominated for the Best First Film at the César Awards Ceremony. That same year he won the BAL Prize for contemporary art. In 2016, he won the SciencesPo Prize for contemporary art and the 18th Ricard Foundation Prize for contemporary art. In 2017, Cogitore released his documentary movie Braguino (Telluride, San Sebastian, Marseille, Toronto, Buenos Aires, Moscow festivals).

In 2018, Clément Cogitore was awarded the Marcel Duchamp Prize for Contemporary Art, for his work The Evil Eye. Since 2018, he is teaching at the Ecole des Beaux Arts de Paris, where he directs a film director's workshop.

To celebrate its 350th anniversary, in 2019, the Opéra National de Paris has entrusted Clément Cogitore with staging the entirety of Jean-Philippe Rameau’s opera ballet, Les Indes galantes. Les Indes galantes was selected by The New York Times as one of the best opera productions of 2019, nominated best opera production 2019 by the Giornale della Musica and won the Forum Opera Trophy of the best new opera production 2019. In 2020, Oper! Awards presented him with the prize for Best Director.

In 2022, his second feature film "Goutte d'or" was selected as a Special Screening at the Critics' Week of the Cannes Film Festival. The film won the Hildegarde Screenplay Award, the Best Director Award at the LEFFEST in Lisbon and the Interpretation Award at the Hainan Film Festival. In 2023, the film has been shortlisted to represent France at the Oscars.

Cogitore’s work is represented in several public collections (Centre Georges Pompidou National Fund for Contemporary Art, Contemporary Art Fund of the City of Paris, FRAC Alsace, FRAC Aquitaine, FRAC Auvergne, MAC VAL, Museum of Modern and Contemporary Art of Strasbourg) and private collections (Louis Vuitton Collection, Daimler Art Collection).

Clément Cogitore is represented by Chantal Crousel Consulting, Paris and Galerie Elisabeth and Reinhard Hauff, Stuttgart.

== Solo shows (selection) ==
- 2024 : Clément Cogitore - Indes Galantes - Joslyn Art Museum - Omaha, NE, USA - Septembre 10th 2024 - February 23, 2025. Curator : Karin Campbell
- 2024 : Bodies in Sync - Bauhaus Museum - Dessau, Germany - April 12, 2024 - February 5, 2025. Curator : Barbara Steiner
- 2023 : Ferdinandea - Galerie Elisabeth & Reinhard Hauff, Stuttgart, Germany - November 24, 2023 - January 26, 2024
- 2023 : Morgestraich - Philharmonie de Paris - Musée de la Musique, Paris, France. Curator : Marie-Pauline Martin
- 2022 : Ferdinandea - MADRE Museo d’Arte Contemporanea Donnaregina, Napoli, Italy. Curator : Kathryn Weir
- 2022 : Notturni - MACRO Mattatoio - Rome, Italy. Curator: Maria-Laura Cavaliere. April 6–7: At the Villa Medici, in parallel to this exhibition, Fictions d’espaces (Fictions of Spaces), a conference by Jacques Rancière on Clément Cogitore's cinematographic visions.
- 2022: Project Room - Le Centquatre - Paris, France. Curator: José-Manuel Gonçalvès
- 2020 : Reste l'air et les formes - FRAC Auvergne, Clermont-Ferrand, France. Curator : Ines Goldbach
- 2019 : Clément Cogitore (Part I et II) – Kunsthaus Baselland, Basel, Switzerland. Curator : Inès Goldbach
- 2019 : Clément Cogitore – Submarine Base Bordeaux, France. Curator : Anne-Sophie Dinant
- 2019 : Clément Cogitore – Musée National Marc Chagall, Nice, France. Curators : Anne Dopffer and Gaïdig Lemarié
- 2018 : Assange Dancing – Ikon Gallery, Birmingham, United Kingdom. Curator : Jonathan Watkins
- 2018 : Les Indes Galantes – Tabakalera, International Centre for Contemporary Culture – San Sebastian, Spain. Curator : Víctor Iriarte
- 2017 : Braguino or the impossible community – LE BAL, Paris, France. Curators : Léa Bismuth and Diane Dufour
- 2017 : Parmi nous (Among us), new hanging within the framework of the Fondation d'Entreprise Ricard Award, Musée National d'Art Moderne, Centre Georges Pompidou, Paris. Curator : Christine Macel
- 2016 : The resonant interval, Palais de Tokyo, Paris. Curator : Daria de Beauvais
- 2014 : Fictions - Strasbourg Museum of Modern and Contemporary Art, Strasbourg, France. Curator : Estelle Pietrzyk
- 2014: Visions - CEAAC, European Center for Contemporary Artistic Action, Strasbourg, France

== Group shows (selection) ==
- 2024 : Ennova Art Biennale - Ennova Art Museum, Langfang, China. Curators : Fumio Nanjo, Zhang Zikang, Qilan Shen
- 2024 :This is tomorrow - Staatsgalerie, Stuttgart, Germany. Curator : Susanne Kaufmann
- 2024 : Cattiva Luce - Palazzo Grassi, Fondation Pinault, Venice, Italy. Curator : Collectif TBD
- 2024: Medienkunstraum - Bundeskunsthalle - Bonn, Germany. Curators : Heinz Schwerfel, Eva Kraus
- 2024: Tanz im Viereck - Neuer Kunstverein Aschaffenburg, Germany. Curator : Anne Hundhausen
- 2024: Come Sing Along ! On Raising Our voices - Lentos Kunstmuseum, Linz, Austria . Curators : Hemma Schutz, Klaus Speidel
- 2023 : Sound Biennial - Valais Art Museum, Switzerland. Curators : Sylvie Zavatta, Christophe Fellay, Jean-Paul Felley, Luc Meier
- 2023 : The last Will - Kunstsammlungen Chemnitz, Chemnitz, Germany . Curators : M+M
- 2023 : Generation* Youth vs. Crisis: A Generation in Search of a Future - Kunsthalle Bremen, Bremen, Germany. Curators : Jennifer Smailes and Eva Fischer-Hausdorf
- 2022 : Manifesto of fragility - Biennale de Lyon, Lyon, France Curators : Sam Bardaouil et Till Fellrath
- 2022 : Still Present! - 12th Berlin Biennale, Berlin Curator: Kader Attia
- 2022 : Pas Sommeil. La fête dans tous ses états - Musée des beaux-arts, FRAC Bretagne, Rennes
- 2021 : Thinking Hands Touching Each Other - 6th Ural Industrial Biennial of Contemporary Art, Yekaterinburg, Russia. Curators: Adnan Yıldız, Çağla Ilk and Assaf Kimmel
- 2021 : Tremblements - Villa Paloma, Nouveau Musée National de Monaco, France Curator: Célia Bernasconi
- 2021 : Replica - Cahn Contemporary, Paris, France Exhibition conceived and curated by Chantal Crousel on the invitation of Jean-David Cahn
- 2021 : E/Motion - MOMU, Antwerp, Belgium Curators : Kaat Debo et Elisa De Wyngaert
- 2020 : Crossing Views, in dialog with Cindy Sherman – Fondation Louis Vuitton, Paris, France. Curator : Suzanne Pagé
- 2020 : Me Family – MUDAM, Luxembourg. Curators : Francesco Bonami, Emmanuela Mazzonis, Clément Minighetti
- 2020 : DO IT project (It’s Urgent) – LUMA (Arles, France), Serpentine Galleries (London, UK) and Théâtre du Châtelet (Paris, France). Curator : Hans-Ulrich Obrist
- 2020 : 20 years Prix Marchel Duchamp – Centre Georges Pompidou, Musée National d’Art Moderne, Paris, France. Curators : Christine Macel, Alicia Knock, Yung Ma
- 2020 : Upheaval – Kunsthalle Mannheim, Mannheim, Germany. Curator : Johan Holten
- 2020 : On the origins of images – Hirshhorn Museum and Sculpture Garden, Washington D.C., United States
- 2019 : An Opera for Animals – Rockbund Art Museum, Shanghai, China. Curator : Hsieh Feng-Rong
- 2019 : Bienalsur, Ways of Seeing – National Museum of Decorative Arts Buenos Aires, Argentina. Curator : Diana Wechsler
- 2019 : Macro_asilo – MACRO, Rome, Italy. Curators : Giorgio de Finis and Maria-Laura Cavaliere
- 2019 : On danse ? – MUCEM, Marseille, France. Curator : Emilie Girard
- 2018 : Prix Marcel Duchamp 2018 – Centre Georges Pompidou, Musée National d’Art Moderne – Paris, France. Curator : Marcella Lista
- 2018 : Evoking Reality – Daimler Contemporary, Berlin, Allemagne. Curators : Renate Wiehager and Nadine Isabelle Henrich
- 2018 : Persona Grata – MAC-VAL, Musée d’Art Contemporain du Val-de-Marne, Vitry sur Seine. Curator : Ingrid Jurzak
- 2018 : Respire : art videos from Lemaitre collection – Herzliya Museum of Contemporary Art, Tel Aviv, Israel. Curator : Marie Shek
- 2018 : Braguino, In formation III – ICA, Institute of Contemporary Arts, Londres, Royaume-Uni. Curator : Nico Marzano
- 2018 : Art of the real – Lincoln Center, New York, USA. Curator : Dennis Limm
- 2017 : The art of joy – Québec Biennale – Musée National des Beaux-Arts du Québec, Montréal, Canada. Curator : Alexia Fabre
- 2017 : Vision on vision, the Lemaitre video collection – SeMA Bunker, Seoul, South Korea. Curator : Hyunjin Kim
- 2016 : New directors, new films – MoMA, Museum Of Modern Art, New York, USA. Curator : Josh Siegel
- 2012 : Teatro delle esposizione – Villa Medici, Rome, Italy. Curator : Alessandro Rabottini
- 2011 : International encounters Paris/Berlin/Madrid – Centre Georges Pompidou, Musée National d’Art Moderne, Paris / Haus der Kulturen der Welt, Berlin / Museo Reina Sofia, Madrid, Spain. Curators : Jean-François Rettig and Nathalie Hénon

== Filmography ==
=== Installations ===
- 2022 : Ferdinandea
- 2018 : The Evil Eye
- 2017 : Braguino or the impossible community

=== Videos ===
- 2022 : Ferdinandea
- 2017 : Lascaux
- 2017 : Les Indes galantes (The amorous Indies)
- 2016 : The resonant interval
- 2013 : Elegies
- 2012 : Assange Dancing
- 2012 : Tahrir
- 2011: An Archipelago
- 2007 : Visités
- 2006: Chroniques
- 2005 : Travel(ing)

=== Films ===
- 2022 : Sons of Ramses
- 2017 : Braguino
- 2015 : The Wakhan Front
- 2011 : Bielutin
- 2011 : Parmi nous (Among us)

=== Opera ===
- Les Indes Galantes (The Amorous Indies), 2019, Opéra National de Paris (Bastille), France

The rehearsals and preparatory work for the opera have been the subject of a documentary film by Philippe Béziat, Les Indes Galantes (2021).

== Publications ==
- 2020 : Me, Family. Portrait of a Young Planet, MUDAM Edition, Luxembourg. Texts : Francesco Bonami, Omar Kholeif, Natalia Kucirkova, Emanuela Mazzonis, Anke Reitz, Ali Smith.
- 2020 : Upheaval, Kunsthalle Mannheim, under the direction of Johann Holten, Distanz Verlag.
- 2019 : Evoking reality, Daimler Contemporary Berlin, Renate Wiehager Editor, Bechtel Druck.
- 2018 : Prix Marcel Duchamp 2018 : the nominated, ADIAF, 2018.
- 2017 : Braguino, DVD, Monography – Blaq out distribution, texts : Eugène Green and Laurent Mauvignier.
- 2017 : Braguino or the impossible community – Monography – Co- Edition Filigranes // LE BAL, texts : Léa Bismuth and Bertrand Schefer.
- 2016 : The Wakhan Front – DVD, Monography – Kazak production.
- 2016 : Hypothesis – DVD, Monography – Ecart production, texts : Philippe-Alain Michaud.
- 2014 : Atelier – Monography – Edition Les Presses du Réel, texts : Dominique Païni, Jean Michel Frodon et Anaël Pigeat.

== Awards ==
- 2024

Nam June Paik Prize, Nominated - Nam June Paik Art Center, Gyeonggi-do, South Korea

- 2023

Goutte d’Or - Shortlisted to represent France at the Oscars

Goutte d’Or - Silver Award for Best Film and Best Actor, AwardHurghada International Youth Film Festival, Egypt

- 2022

Goutte d'Or - Première : Festival de Cannes, Critic’s week, Cannes, France

Goutte d'Or - Best Director Award, LEFFEST, Lisbon, Portugal

Goutte d'Or - Best Actor Award, Hainan Film Festival, China

Goutte d'Or - Winner of Scénario Award, Hildegarde, with the support of the CNC, the Fondation d'entreprise David Hadida and France Culture.

- 2020

Les Indes Galantes (Opera) – Best opera production – Oper ! Awards - Berlin, Germany

- 2019

Braguino - Nominated César Best Short Film – César Academy – France

Les Indes Galantes – 10 Best opera productions – New York Times – USA

Les Indes Galantes – Best opera production – Giornale della Musica Award – Italy

Les Indes Galantes – Best opera production – Forum Opéra Award – France

- 2018

The Evil Eye – Marcel Duchamp Prize 2018 – France

Les Indes Galantes – Grand Prix UniFrance for short film – Cannes Film Festival – France

Braguino – Special Mention – BAFICI, Buenos Aires Festival Internacional de Cine Independiente – Argentina

Braguino – Special Mention, documentary competition – DokerFest – Moscow – Russia

- 2017

Braguino – Grand Prix (special mention) – FID Festival International de Cinéma – Marseille – France

Neither Heaven nor Earth – Grand Prix – Kino der Kunst Film Festival – Artists under 35 – Munich – Germany

Braguino – Grand Prix – Les Ecrans Documentaires – La Rochelle – France

Braguino – Zabaltegi-Tabakalera Award – San Sebastian Film Festival – Spain

Braguino – Special mention from the Jury – Festival Internacional de Cine de Valdivia – Chile

- 2016

18th Award of the Fondation d’entreprise Ricard – Paris – France

Sciences Po Award for Contemporary Art – Paris – France

Neither Heaven nor Earth – Award Best First Film – Colcoa Film Festival Los Angeles – USA

Neither Heaven nor Earth – Jury Award – Sarasota International Film Festival – USA

Neither Heaven nor Earth – Prix Henri Langlois – France

- 2015

LE BAL Award for Young creation – Paris – France

Neither Heaven nor Earth – Grand Prix Gan Foundation – Cannes Film Festival – Critic's Week – France

Neither Heaven nor Earth – Award Best First Film - Syndicat de la Critique – France

Neither Heaven nor Earth – Nominated for César Best First Film – France

Neither Heaven nor Earth – Nominated for Golden Camera – Cannes Film Festival – France

Neither Heaven nor Earth – Award Best First Film – Obrero International Film Festival – Sweden

Neither Heaven nor Earth – Award Best First Film - Motovun International Film Festival - Croatia

Neither Heaven nor Earth – Award Best Film – Festival International du Film d’Aubagne – France

Neither Heaven nor Earth – Prix Découverte – Festival du Film Francophone de Namur – Belgique

- 2014

Award Fondation Nationale des Arts Graphiques et Plastiques (FNAGP) – Paris – France

- 2012

Neither Heaven nor Earth – Award for the script – Fondation Beaumarchais – SACD – France

Parmi nous (Among us) – Best camera – Lucania International Film Festival – Italy

- 2011

Grand Prix Salon de Montrouge – 56th Salon de Montrouge – France

Biélutine – Official selection – Quinzaine des réalisateurs – Cannes Film Festival – France

Parmi nous (Among us) – Best Film – International Film Festival Belo Horizonte – Brasil

- 2010

Parmi nous (Among us) – European Grand Prix First Film – Fondation Vevey – Switzerland

Biélutine – FIDLab Award – Festival International de Cinéma – Marseille – France

Burning cities – Experimental film award – FESANCOR, Chilean International Short Film Festival – Santiago – Chile

- 2007

Visités – Jury award – Festival du Film de Vendôme – France

Visités – Best camera – International Student Film Festival – Belgrad – Serbia

- 2006

Chroniques – Grand Prix (Special mention) – Festival Entrevues – Belfort – France

Chroniques – Best short film script – Fondation Beaumarchais – SACD – Paris – France

Chroniques – Award Center for cinematographic writing – Festival les Ecrans documentaires – Arcueil – France
