= Temitayo =

- Gender: Unisex
- Language: Yoruba

Origin
- Origin: Nigeria
- Meaning: Mine is worthy of joy
- Region of origin: South-west Nigeria

Temitayo // is a Yoruba given name meaning “mine is worthy of joy”.

== Notable people with the name include ==
- Temitayo Ogunbiyi (born 1984), American artist
- Temitayo Shokunbi, Nigerian neurosurgeon
- Israel Mobolaji Temitayo Odunayo Oluwafemi Owolabi Adesanya (born 1989), Nigerian mixed martial artist and New Zealand kickboxer
