= List of World War I memorials and cemeteries in Alsace =

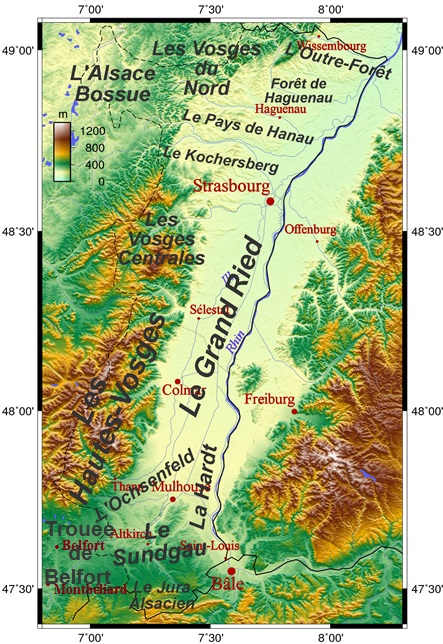
Topographical map of Alsace

This is a List of World War I Memorials and Cemeteries in Alsace. Alsace saw heavy fighting and the loss of life during World War I, as the Western front cut through the area. Because of this, there are several memorials and cemeteries dedicated to those who lost their lives in the area during the war.

== Background ==
Alsace comprises the départements of Bas-Rhin and Haut-Rhin, the Western Front passed through Haut-Rhin. The largest of the battles fought in the area during World War I were the Battle of Mulhouse and the Battle of Hartmannswillerkopf.

== List of cemeteries and memorials ==
=== Monument in the French cemetery at Lapoutroie ===
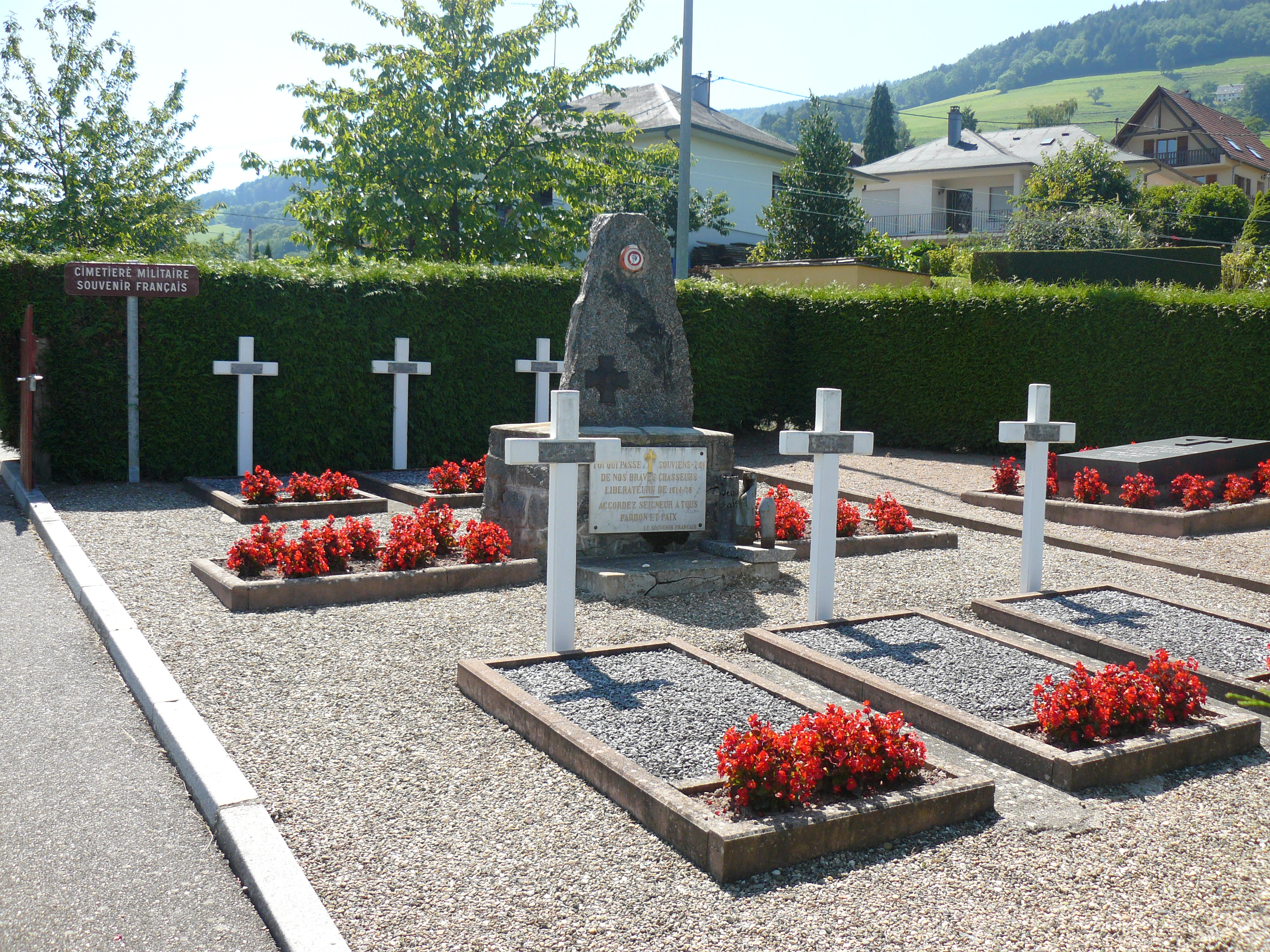
Monument in the French cemetery at Lapoutrie

Lapoutroie's war cemetery is the site of one of the many monuments to the chasseurs in Alsace.

=== The Col du Bonhomme ===
On 12 August 1939 a memorial was unveiled to commemorate those killed in a German artillery bombardment in the Col du Bonhomme on 8 September 1914, including several senior officers and the commander of the 41st Infantry Division, General Marie Désiré Bataille.

=== La Tête des Faux ===
At the top of the Tête des Faux there are the remains of a French look-out post and a small memorial which, translated, reads:

"Here fell for France on July 6, 1916, Captain Demmler, Doctor Espagne, Jean-François Bouvier, Jean-Marie Renaud of the 62e BCA ". Probably the victims of a shell that fell on a shelter located at this place"

In the pass that separates the two peaks of the Têtes des Faux is the cemetery at Duchesne. It contains the remains of 292 French soldiers in individual graves and another 116 who rest in an ossuary. The bodies here were brought in from Stosswihr, Orbey, Soultzeren and the Col du Bonhomme. In this cemetery there is a monument with the inscriptions (translated):

"My brothers in arms for the Fatherland. The 14e BCA – June 1915"

and

"[Dedicated] to the commander J. Duchesne, head of battalion 215e, died for the Fatherland on 2 December 1914 at the assault of Grimaude"

Duchesne had been killed in the December 1914 assault on the Têtes des Faux at Grimaude.

=== The "Croix de Wihr" ===
This monument commemorates the advance of the 152nd French Infantry Division on 19 August 1914 and marks the furthest point reached by the French army in Alsace during the 1914-1918 war. The 152nd were nicknamed the "Diables Rouges", or " Red Devils".

=== The Linge Memorial and the Cimetière des Chasseurs ===
The front line in early 1915 ran north of the Col de Wettstein. This peak has a height of 882 metres and on its lower slopes there is a French war cemetery known as the Cimetière des Chasseurs or the Cimetière du Col du Wettstein. This cemetery holds 2,201 individual graves with the remains of another 1,334 men lying in two ossuaries. Bodies here were brought in from Lingekopf, Barenkopf, Schratzmännele and the Valley de la Fecht as well as from Stosswihr, Soultzeren, Muhlbach, Hohrod, les Trois-Epis and Orbey. The main Linge Memorial is located in this cemetery and is dedicated to those who fought in the Battle of Linge.

The memorial is dominated by a large cross with the word "PAX" ("peace") inscribed at the centre. The original wooden cross is set into the cross further down and the body of a chasseur lies at its foot. It also bears the inscription "AUX MORTS DU LINGE" ("to the dead of Linge"). Beneath the sculpture of the soldier is a plaque reading "Les Diables Rouges du 15-2 aux Diables Bleus tombés en Alsace" ("From the Diables Rouges of 152e to the Diables Bleus who fell in Alsace").

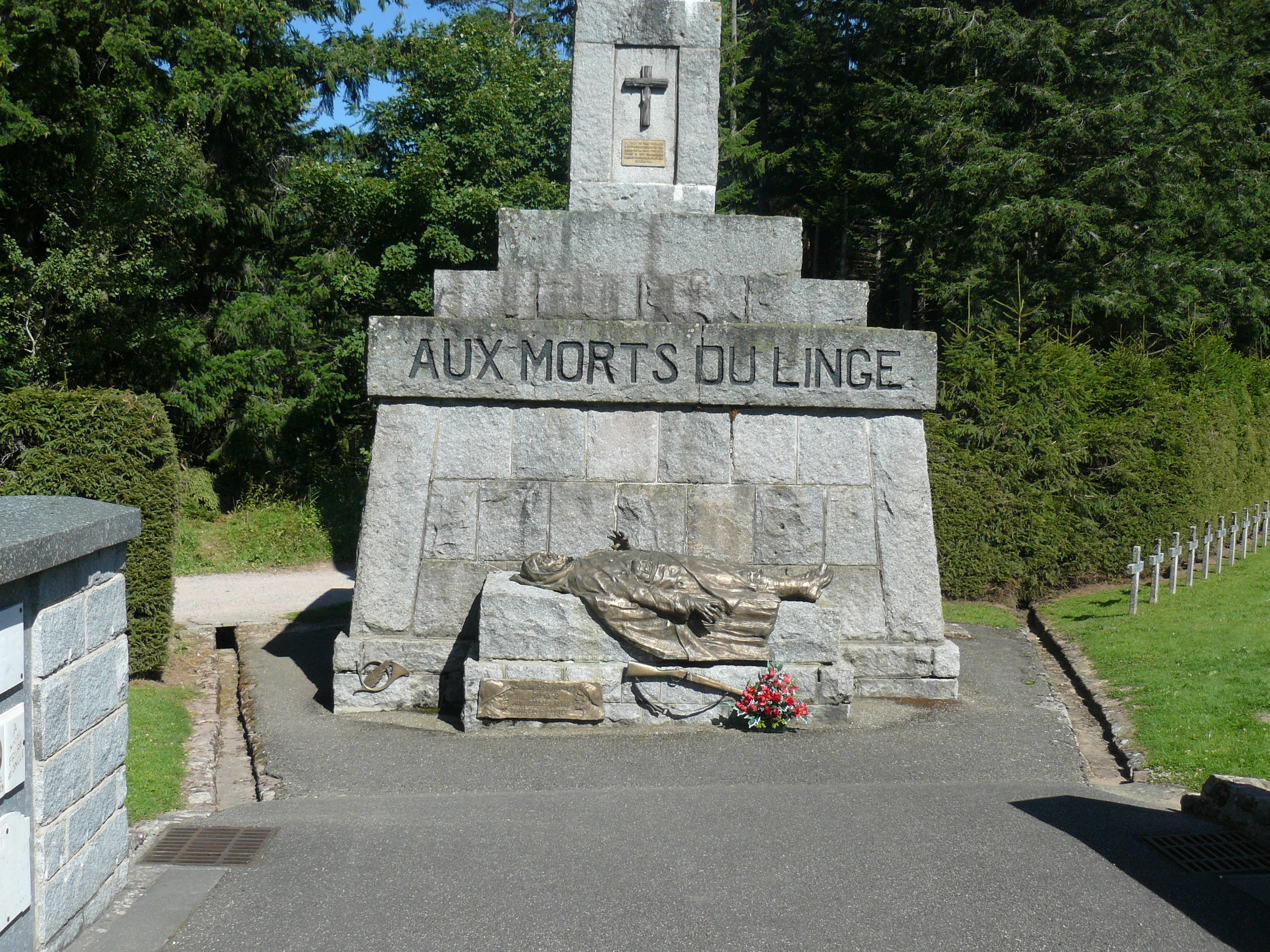
Depiction of a dead soldier at the foot of a giant cross in the French military cemetery at the Col de Wettstein.

The main memorial dedicated to this battle is to be found in this cemetery. It depicts a dead chasseur lying prostrate beneath a large cross. A young officer in the chasseurs had made a wooden cross from some pine trees damaged by gunfire and this was replaced at a later stage by a cross carved from granite. It was inaugurated by General Maurice Gamelin in 1939. The original wooden cross has been kept and is fixed to the monument with the inscription (translated):

"The above wooden cross was made with the remains of the primitive cross erected on this site by those who fought in Linge in April 1915"

Apart from the main memorial to the dead of the Linge fighting there are other memorials in the area dedicated to individual units.

=== Memorials by the Linge Museum ===
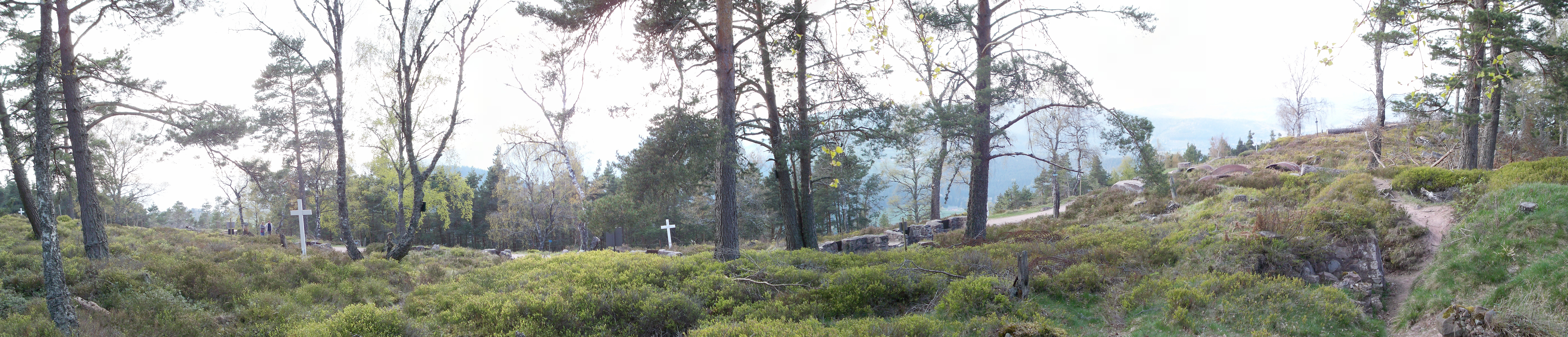
The Ridge at Linge

Just by the museum at Linge there is a monument whose inscription dedicates it to the "10,000 French dead whose blood stained this land." Around the memorial, white crosses indicate points were bodies were found and exhumed.

The memorial museum at Linge was built between 1973 and 1981 by an association called the "Mémorial du Linge". Near the museum there is a small memorial called "Armistice". It was the idea of Gérard Ambroselli and carries the text of a poem by André Piot who had fought in the war.

=== The memorial on the Schratzmännele ===
The inscription on the memorial on the Schratzmännele dedicates it to the commanders Charles Colardelle and Charles Barberot; the 48 officers and 2160 non-commissioned officers, corporals and chasseurs of the 5th Battalion of Chasseurs; and the officers, non-commissioned officers, corporals and chasseurs of the 45th Bataillon of Chasseurs and 107th Battalion of Chasseurs who were killed or missing in action. The inscription also states that the monument was destroyed by the Germans and rededicated in 1950.

=== Monument to the chasseurs and the 46th, 66th and 129th French Infantry ===
There is also a monument in this area dedicated to the soldiers of the 120th Battalion of Chasseurs and of the 46th, 66th and 129th Infantry who fought on the Linge ridge.

=== French War cemetery at Sainte-Marie-aux-Mines ===
This cemetery holds the graves of 182 chasseurs of the 22nd, 52nd, 71st, 100th, 149th, 158th, 170th and 221st infantry regiments, as well as the 30th and 31st bataillons of chasseurs.

=== French War cemetery at Le Bois de Maettle ===
This cemetery in the Fecht valley was started in 1920 with the dead from trench warfare in Haute Alsace, the Vallée de la Fecht, Reichakerkopf and Hilsenfirst. Later further bodies were brought in from the battlefield and provisional burial plots in Sondernach, Wihr-au-Val and Mülbach.

=== Monument to the 66th Chasseurs in Thann ===
In the Place de la République in Thann there is a monument dedicated to the soldiers of the 66th Bataillon of Chasseurs, and their last leader, General Georges Brissaud-Desmaillet.

At the foot of the monument are General Joseph Joffre's words of 24 November 1914. Translated, they read:

"Our return is final. You are French forever. France brings you, with the freedoms it has always represented, respect for your freedoms, Alsatian freedoms, your traditions, your convictions, your customs. I am France. You are Alsace. I bring you the kiss of France."

=== Chêne-Millet ===
Around Munster is a cemetery known as the "Chêne Millet", which holds the remains of 2,632 Frenchmen. It is located between Metzeral and Mittach.

=== Memorial to the Chasseur Alpins ===
At Soultz along the Route des Cretes and on the Grand Ballon are two memorials to the Chasseurs Alpins, which together form a single memorial. The original single monument was erected in 1927 but was dynamited by the Germans in July 1940 during World War II. The first memorial comprises a small pedestal with a bronze depicting the typical oversized beret worn by the chasseurs perched on the top. This beret was retrieved from the original monument. A plaque fixed to the monument explains that the land was given to the Club Alpin Francais by the town of Soultz out of gratitude to those who helped France secure the return of Alsace and Lorraine. A second plaque states that the memorial is dedicated to the "Diables Bleus" (Blue Devils) which was the nickname of the 66th Bataillon of Chasseurs. A little further on there is a 1960s reconstruction of the 1927 memorial with a bronze by sculptor Pierre Bouret. It depicts a chasseur alpin in winter outfit including the famous beret.

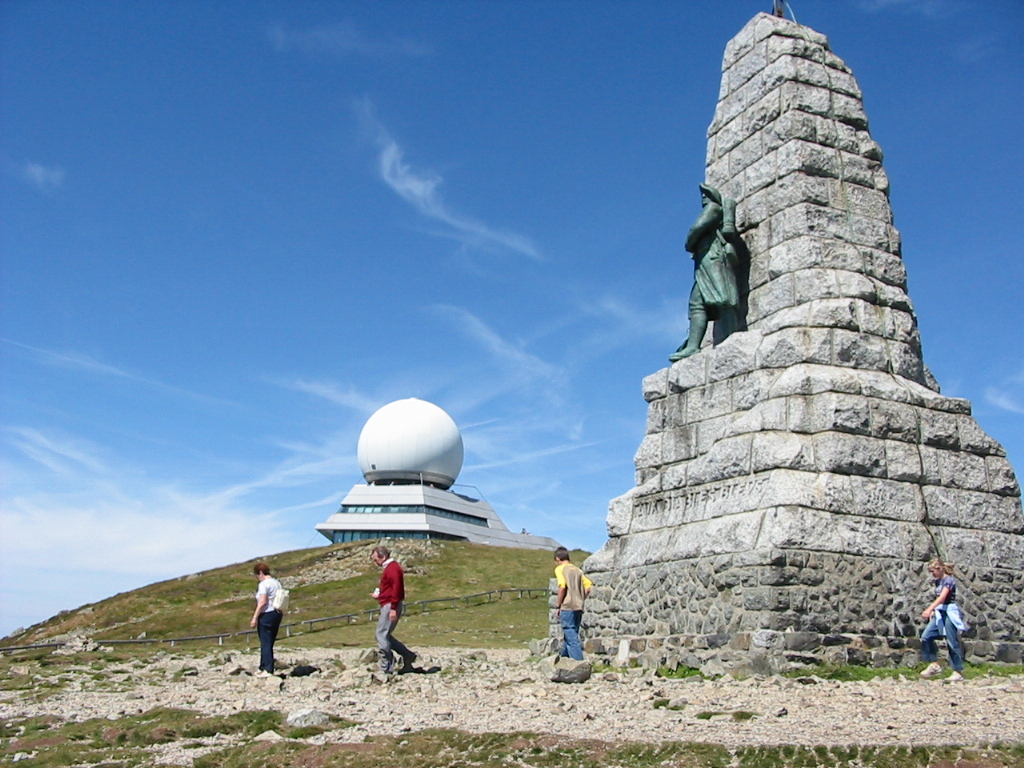
Monument on Grand Ballon

=== The chapel at the Sudelkopf ===
At fr:Sudelkopf there is a small French national memorial chapel built on the site of a French observation and machine gun post. The plaque states that it was erected by Souvenir Français in 1951 and dedicated to Joan of Arc in memory of the dead of the 7th Infantry Division (France) and the 5th Regiment of Chasseurs.

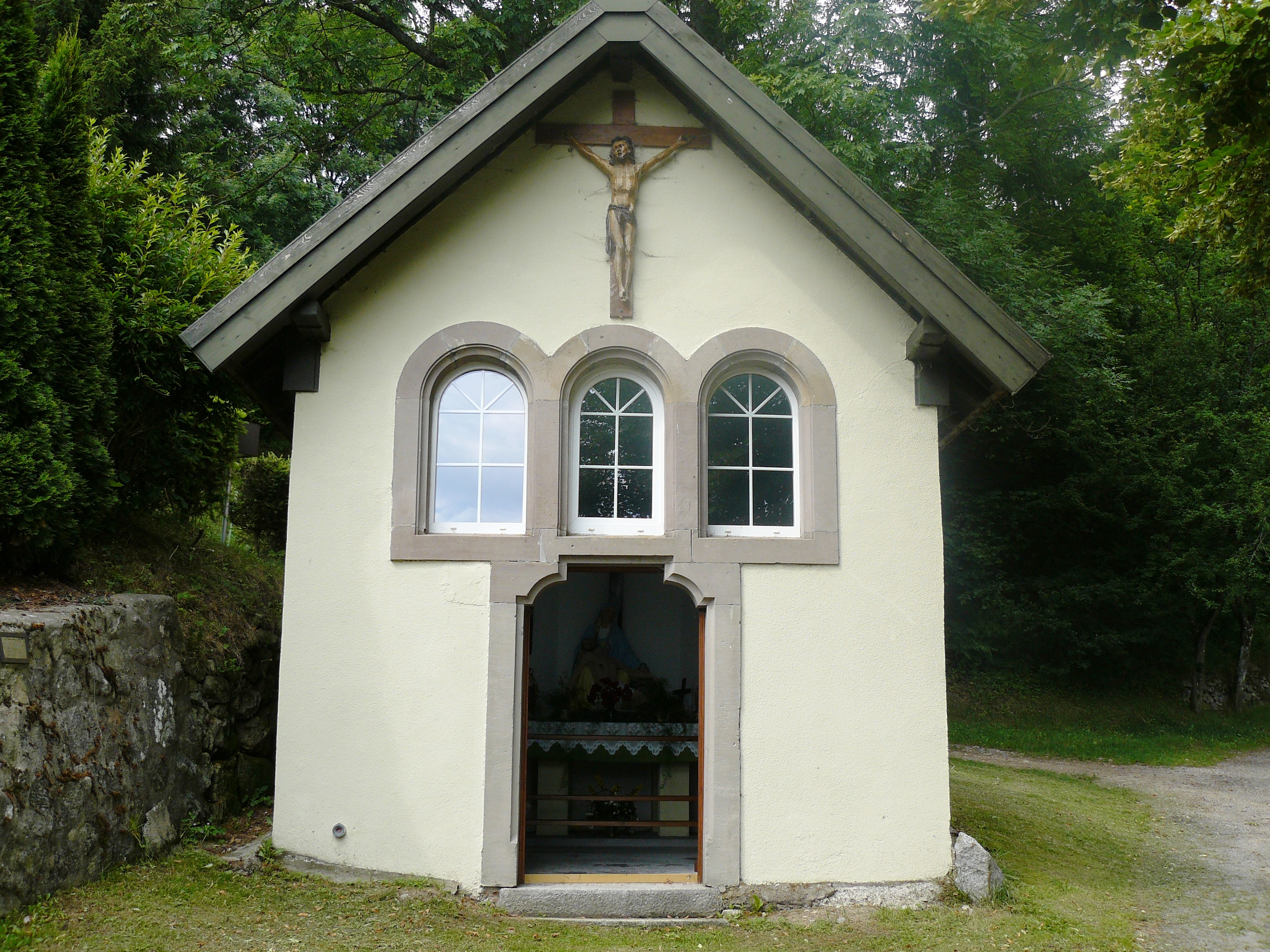
The chapel at Sudelkopf

=== The Col Amic and the memorial to Captain Amic ===
On the fr:Col Amic near Hartmannswillerkopf is a memorial to Captain Paul Amic who was killed during the Battle of Hartmannswillerkopf on 21 December 1915. Before the war this peak was known as the Kohlschlag but was renamed "Amic" by the French. He had once said:

"If I die my friends, of hopes and misery, you will bury me near the front in the earth under the fir cross near the blazing steeple, but keep the ground where I fell."

— Paul Amic, 1915

=== Hartmannswillerkopf ===
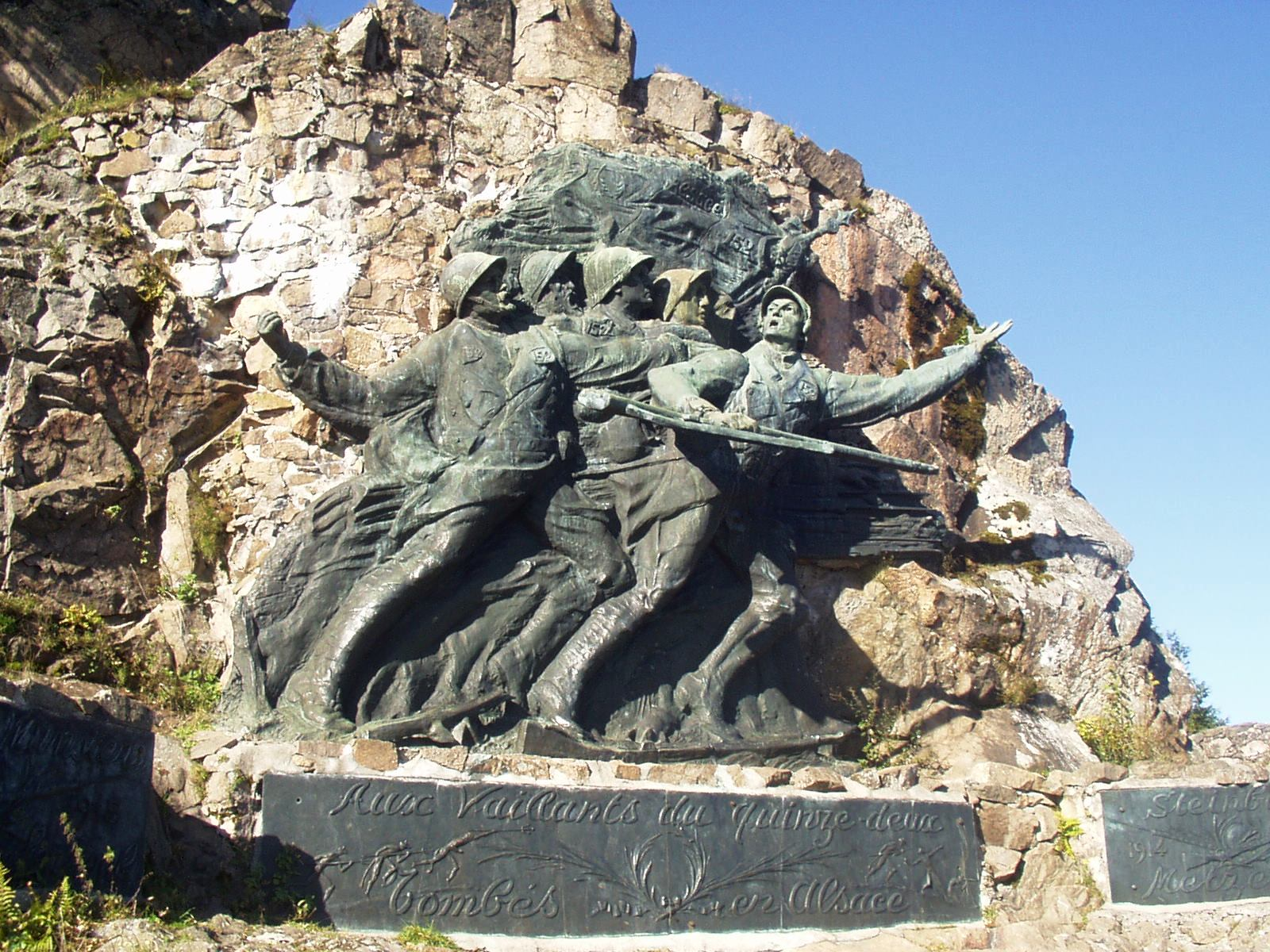
Monument dedicated to the "Diables Rouges" ("Red Devils") as the 152nd Infantry Regiment were known

The National Monument of the Battle of Hartmannswillerkopf was inaugurated on 9 October 1932. It consists of a crypt carved out of the bedrock. The entrance is approached by a cutting from the road and is flanked by two bronze representations of victory by the sculptor Antoine Bourdelle. Inside the crypt and covered by a large bronze shield is an ossuary which contains the remains of 12,000 unidentified soldiers. There are also Protestant and Jewish altars and a Catholic chapel. On the esplanade, which is situated above the crypt, is the Altar de la Patrie. This symbolises the raising of volunteers en masse for the defence of France and the Republic. It bears on its sides the names of the cities which contributed to the building of the memorial.

Behind this crypt is a French military cemetery which contains 1,640 soldiers of whom the remains of 384 are in six ossuaries. Near to this cemetery is the monument dedicated to the "Diables Rouges" ("Red Devils") as the 152nd Infantry Division were known. This bronze depicts five larger-than-life-size soldiers all in attacking mode. The sculpture is mounted on a sheer rock face so that the figures appear to be looking out over the Alsace plain.

=== French National War Cemetery at Moosch ===
The cemetery contains the bodies of 593 French soldiers many of whom were killed at Hartsmannswiller. The cemetery holds the graves of General Marcel Serret, Captain Paul Amic, and Richard Hall of the American Ambulance Field Service. General Serret commanded the 66th Infantry Division (France), which fought at Hartmannswillerkopf. He was killed on 6 January 1916.

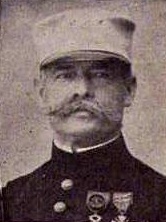
General Serret

=== French War cemetery at Altkirch ===
This cemetery at Altkirch in the Haut-Rhin contains the remains of 1,785 soldiers from the 1914-1918 war. 1,734 are Frenchmen of whom 912 lie in two ossuaries. The cemetery was created in 1920 to receive bodies from fighting south east of Mulhouse and from the village areas of Ballersdorf, Friesen, Illzach, Lutterbach, Sierentz and Zillisheim.

=== The Memorial at Joncherey ===
Joncherey is where the first casualties of the war on the Western Front occurred in one of the border incidents that preceded the formal declarations of war. At the eastern edge of the village is a monument to Corporal Jules-André Peugeot who was killed at 10am on 2 August 1914, 30 hours before war was declared between France and Germany. He was the first French casualty of the war and died just in front of the house which stands across the road from the monument. His patrol from the 44th Infantry Regiment was surprised by and fired upon by a patrol of seven German cavalrymen. The first German casualty, Lieutenant Albert Mayer, was killed in the same incident.

== Gallery ==
Poster for Vosges in happier days.

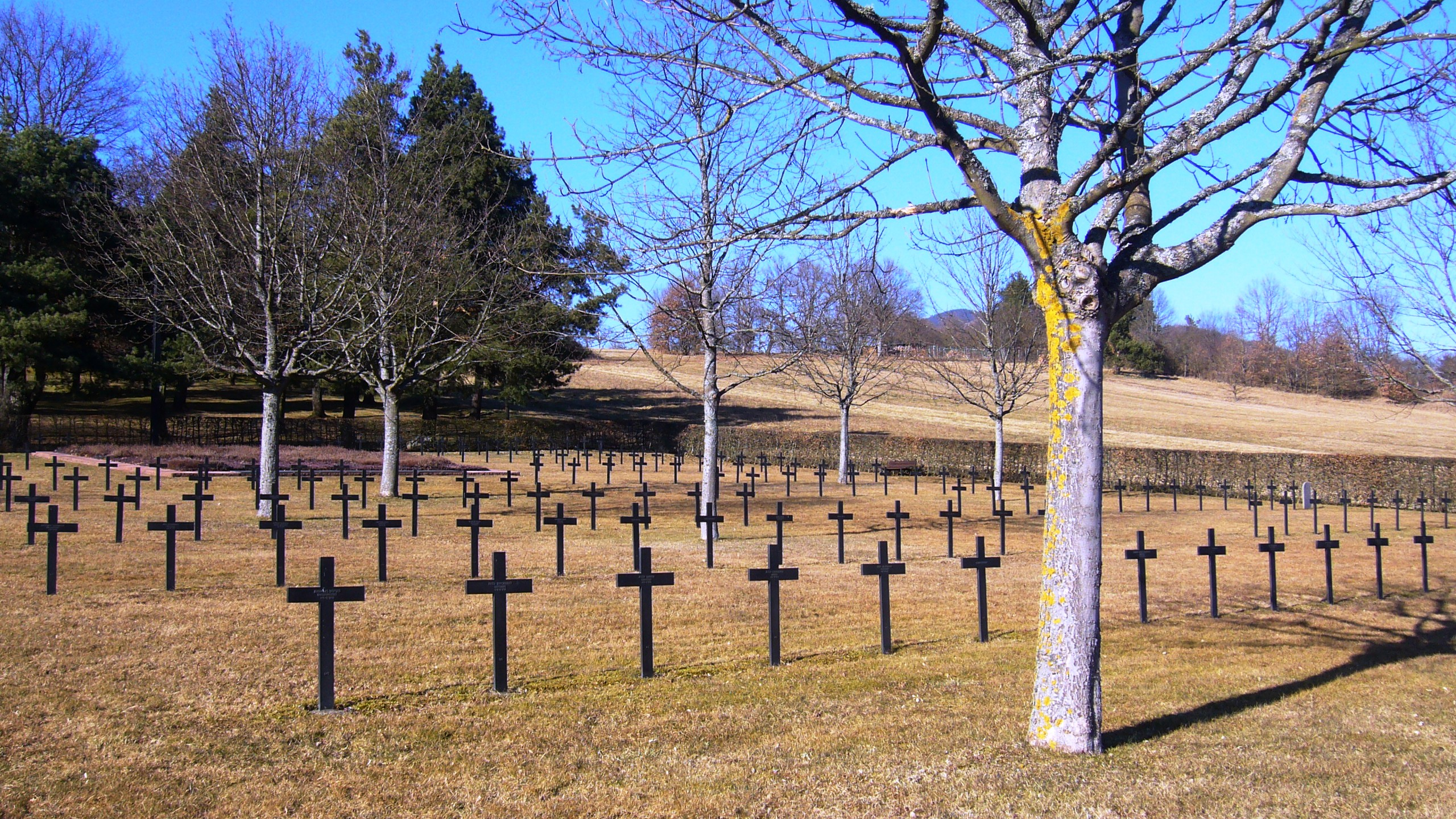
German Military cemetery at Thanvillé.

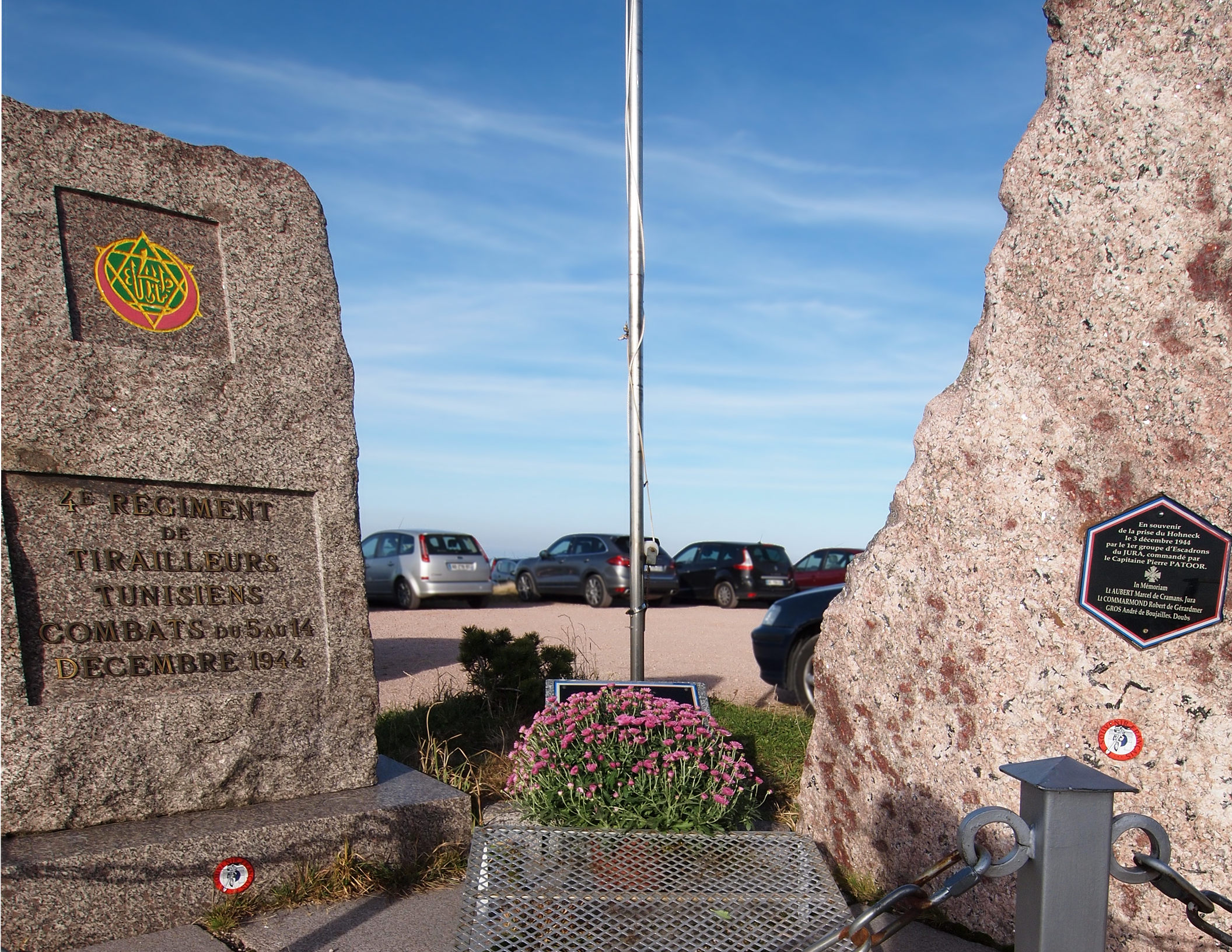
Memorial on the Hohneck to Tunisian soldiers.

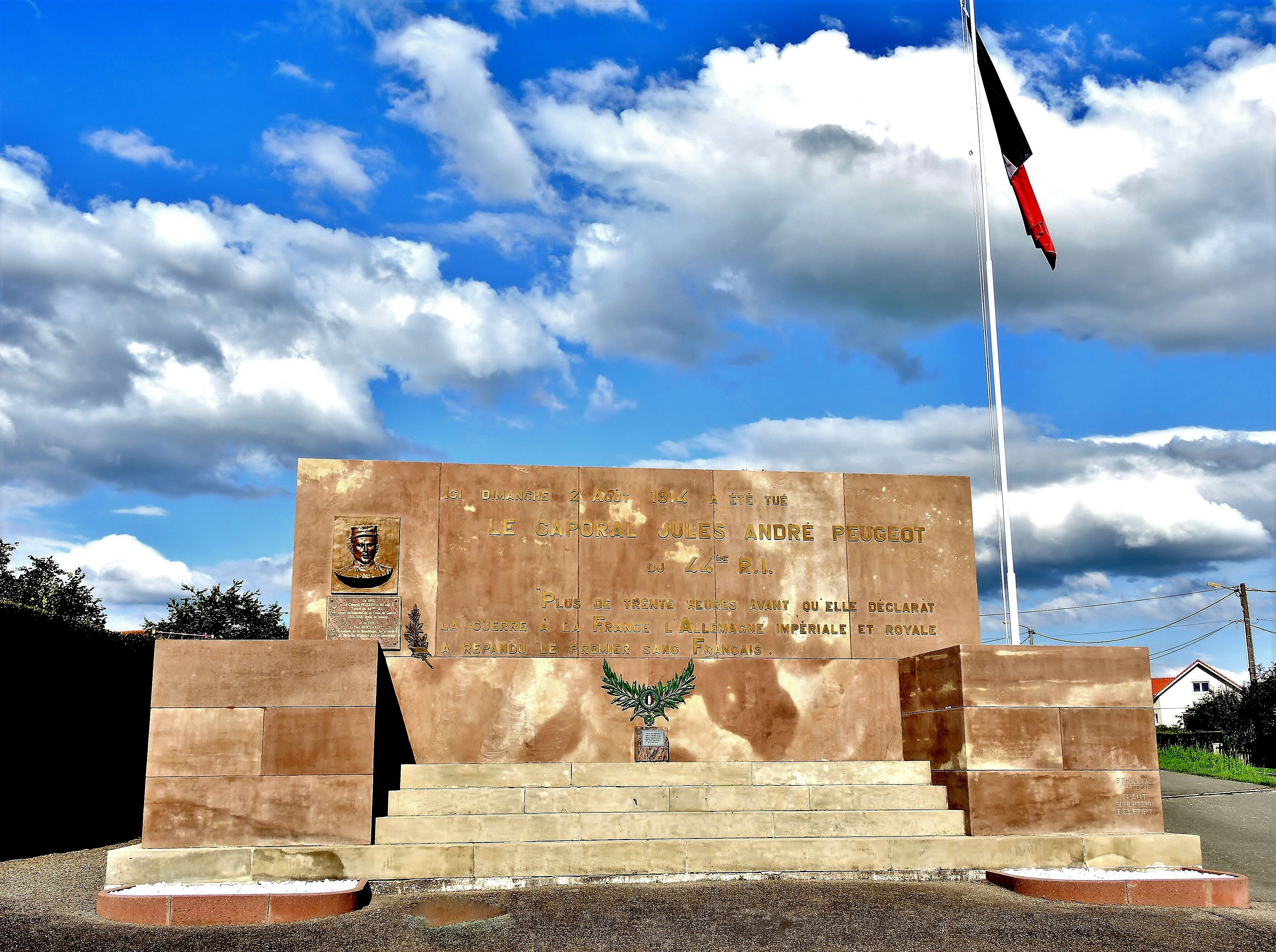
Memorial at Joncherry to the first Frenchman killed in 1914.

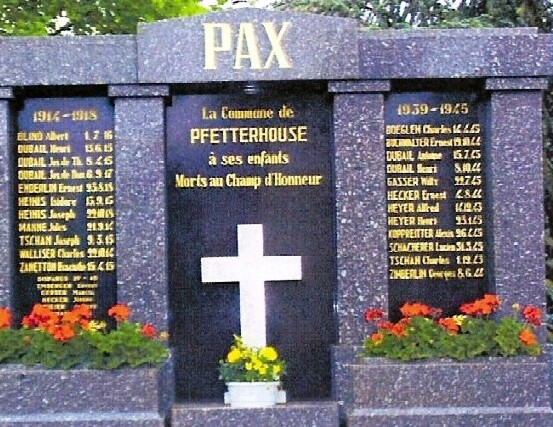
War Memorial at Pfetterhouse- The last along the Western Front.

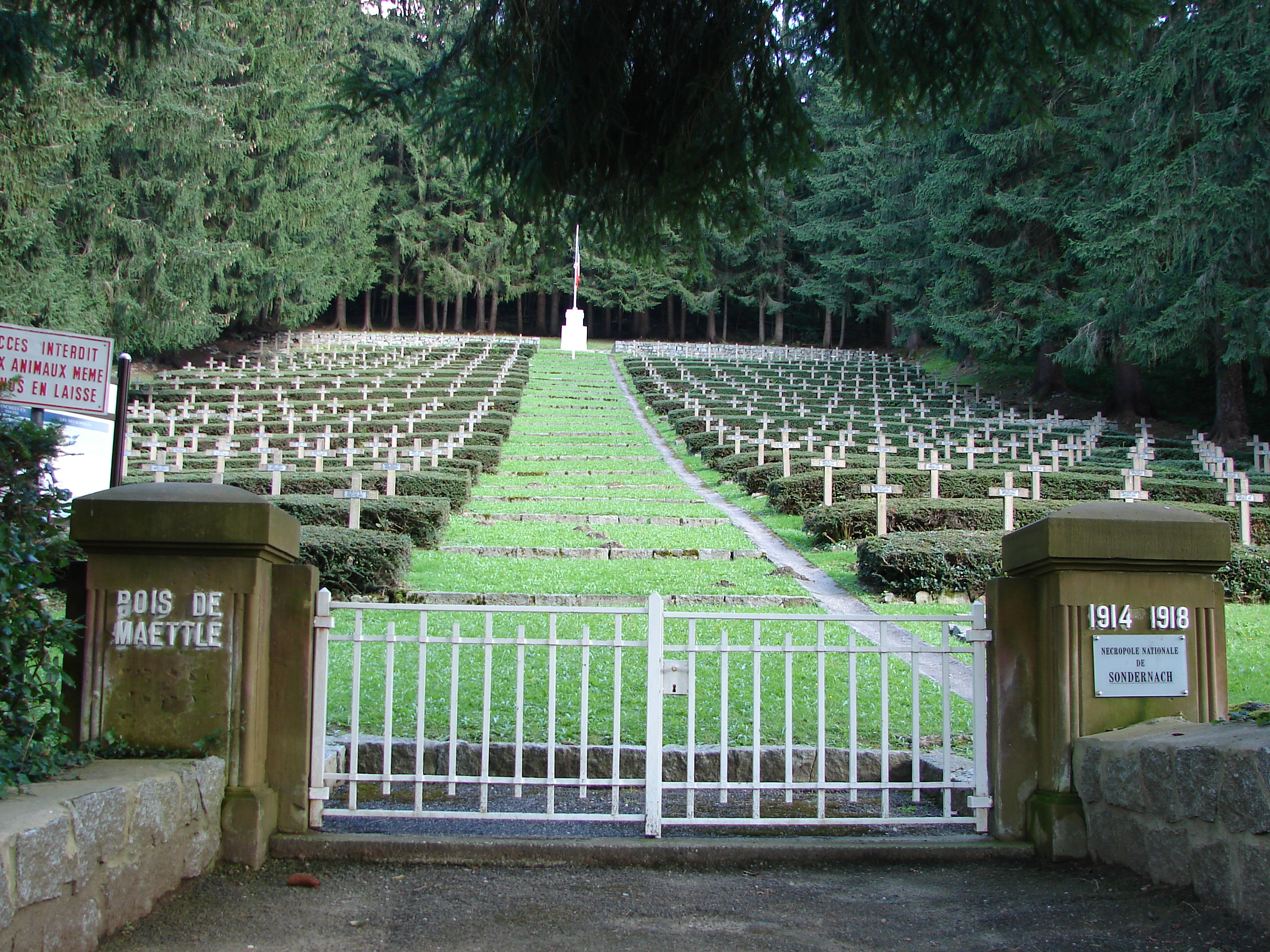
Bois de Maettlé cemetery near Sondernach.

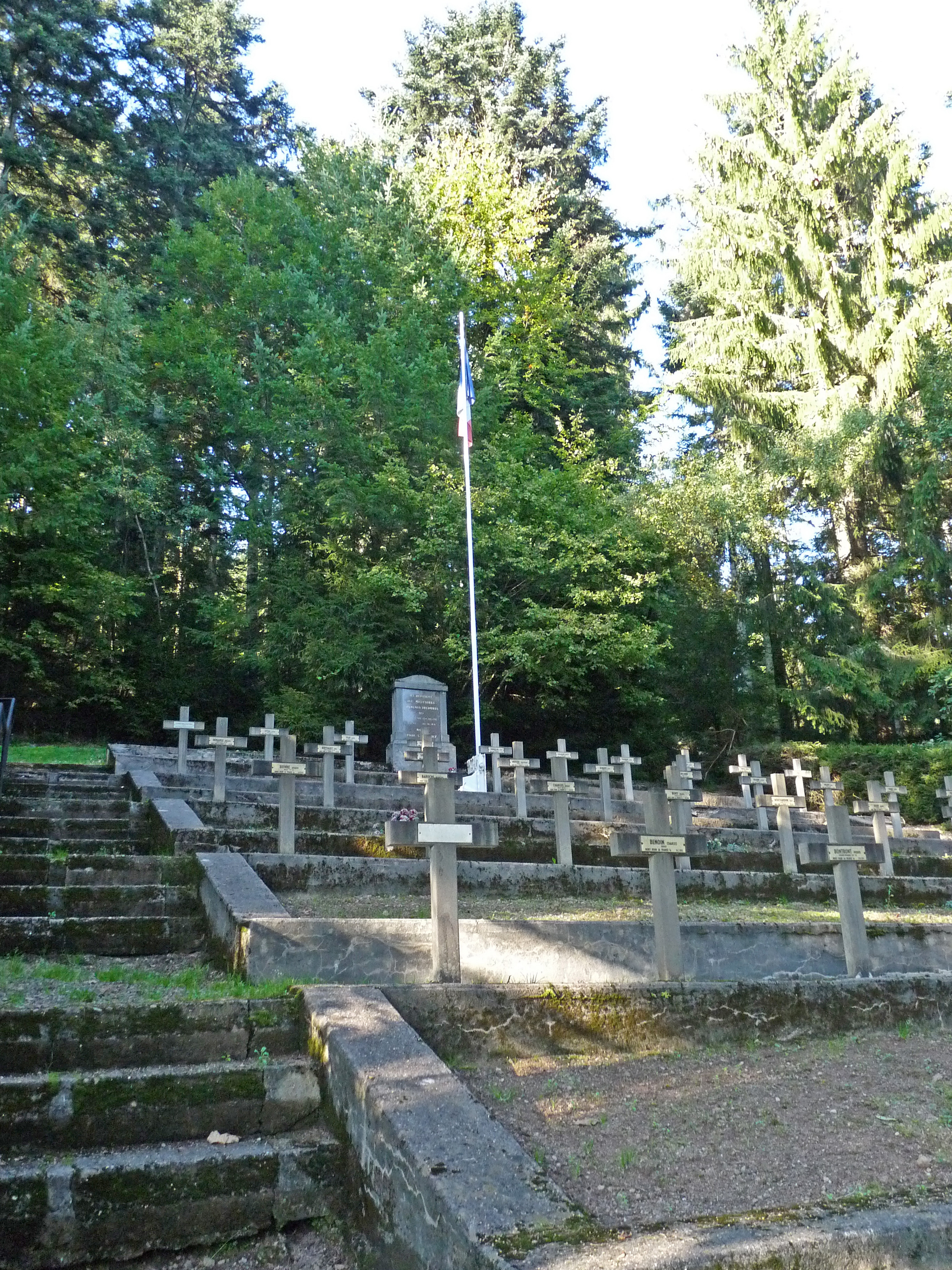
Cemetery at the Col de Sainte-Marie.

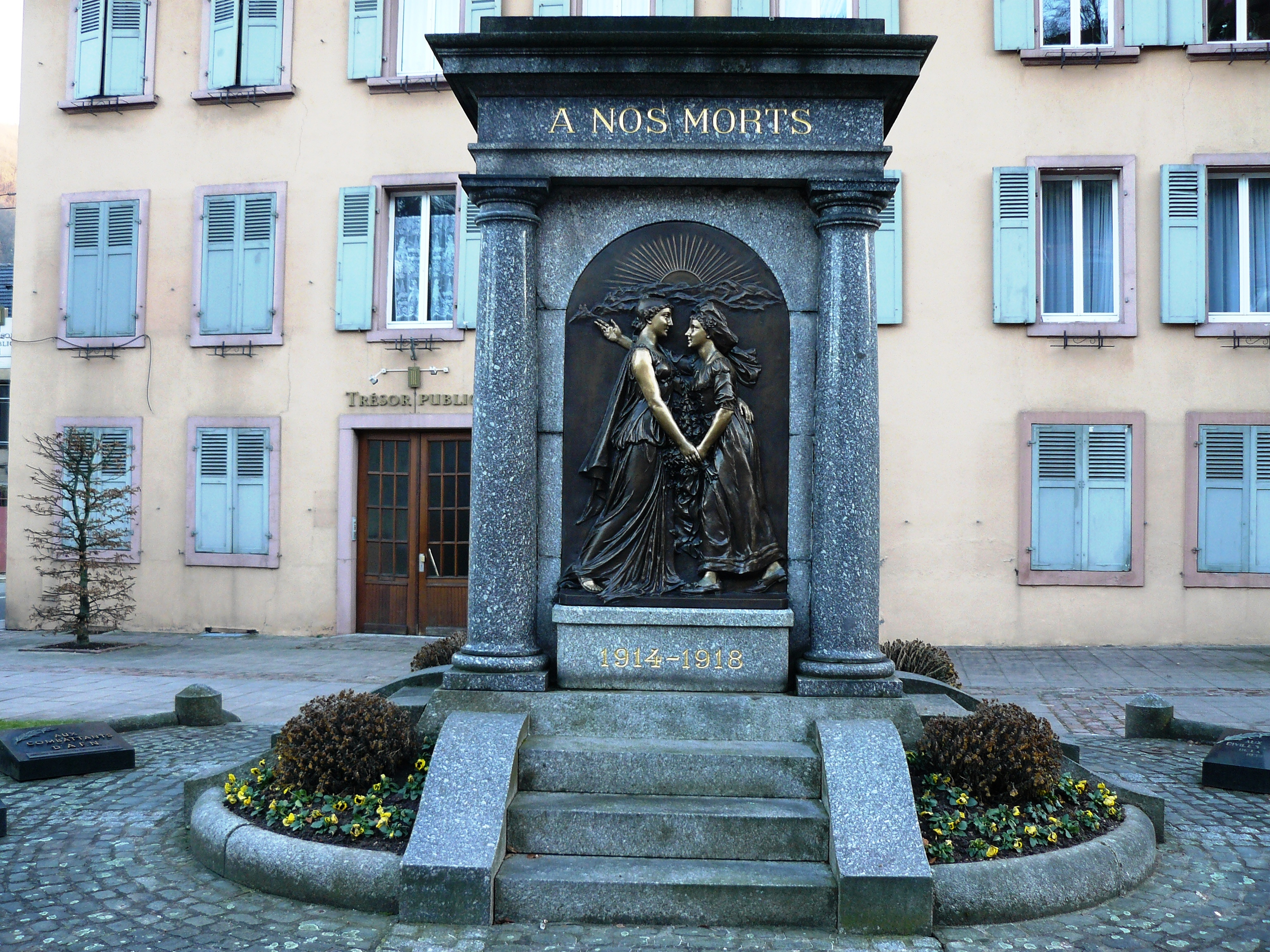
War memorial at Sainte Marie-aux-Mines.

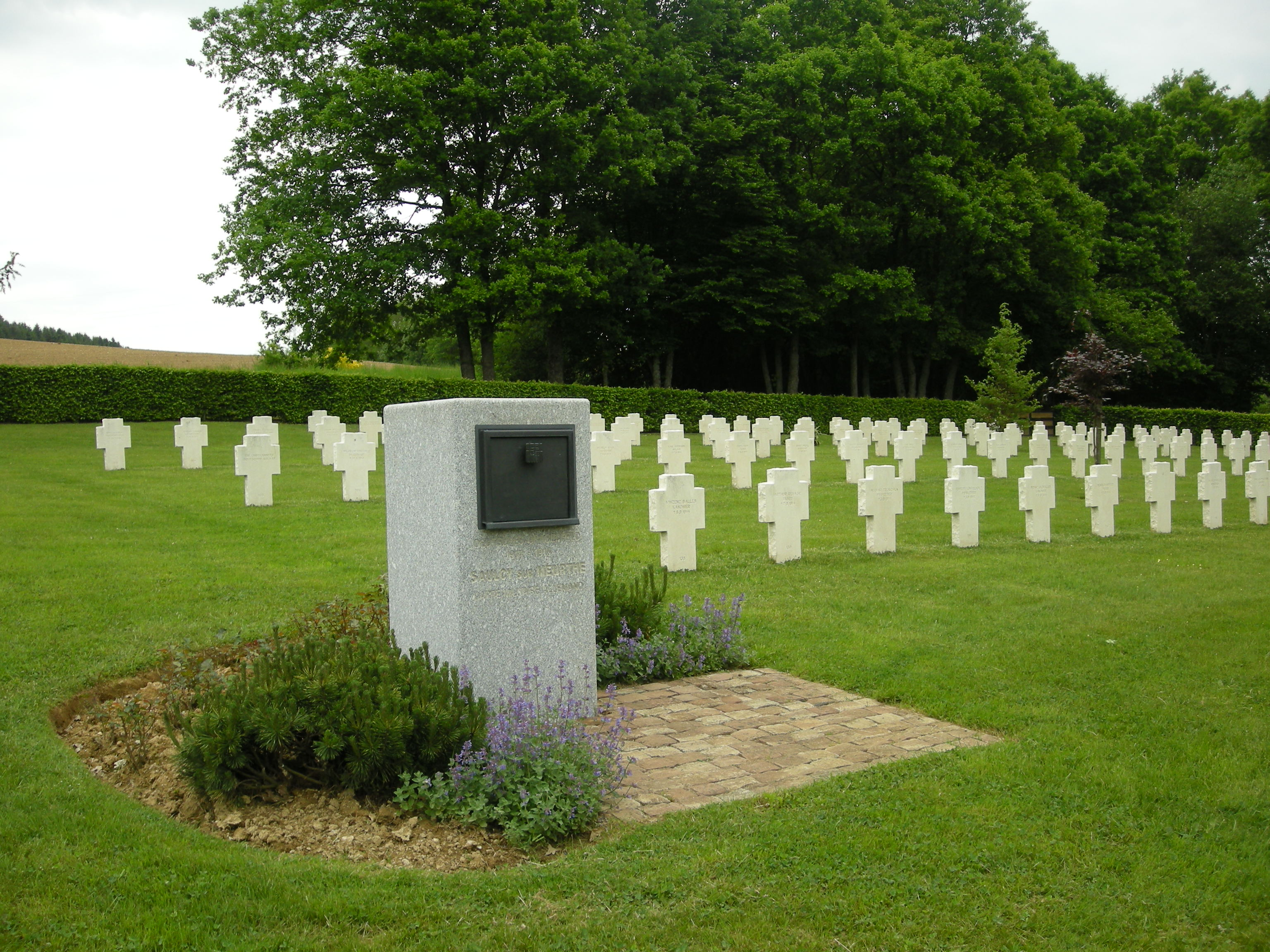
German graves at Saulcy-sur-Meurthe

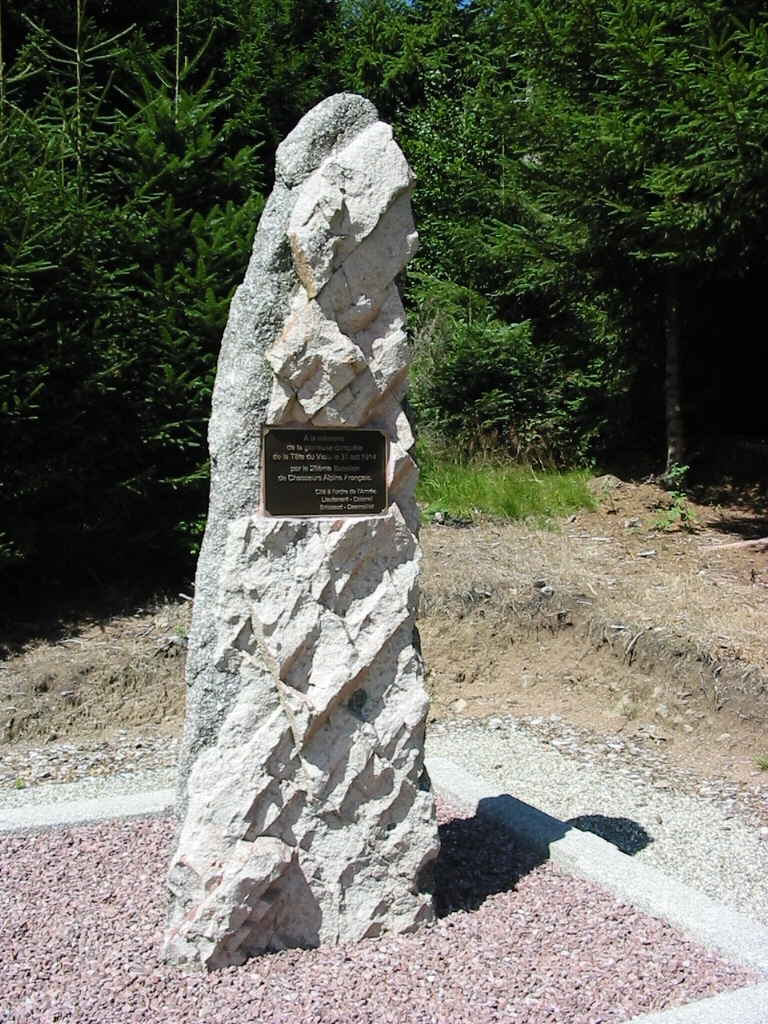
Memorial at Sainte-Marie-aux-Mines which commemorates the conquest of the Tête du Violu on 31 October 1914 by the 28th Battalion of the chasseurs alpins. Lieutenant Colonel Brissaud-Desmaillet led the attack.

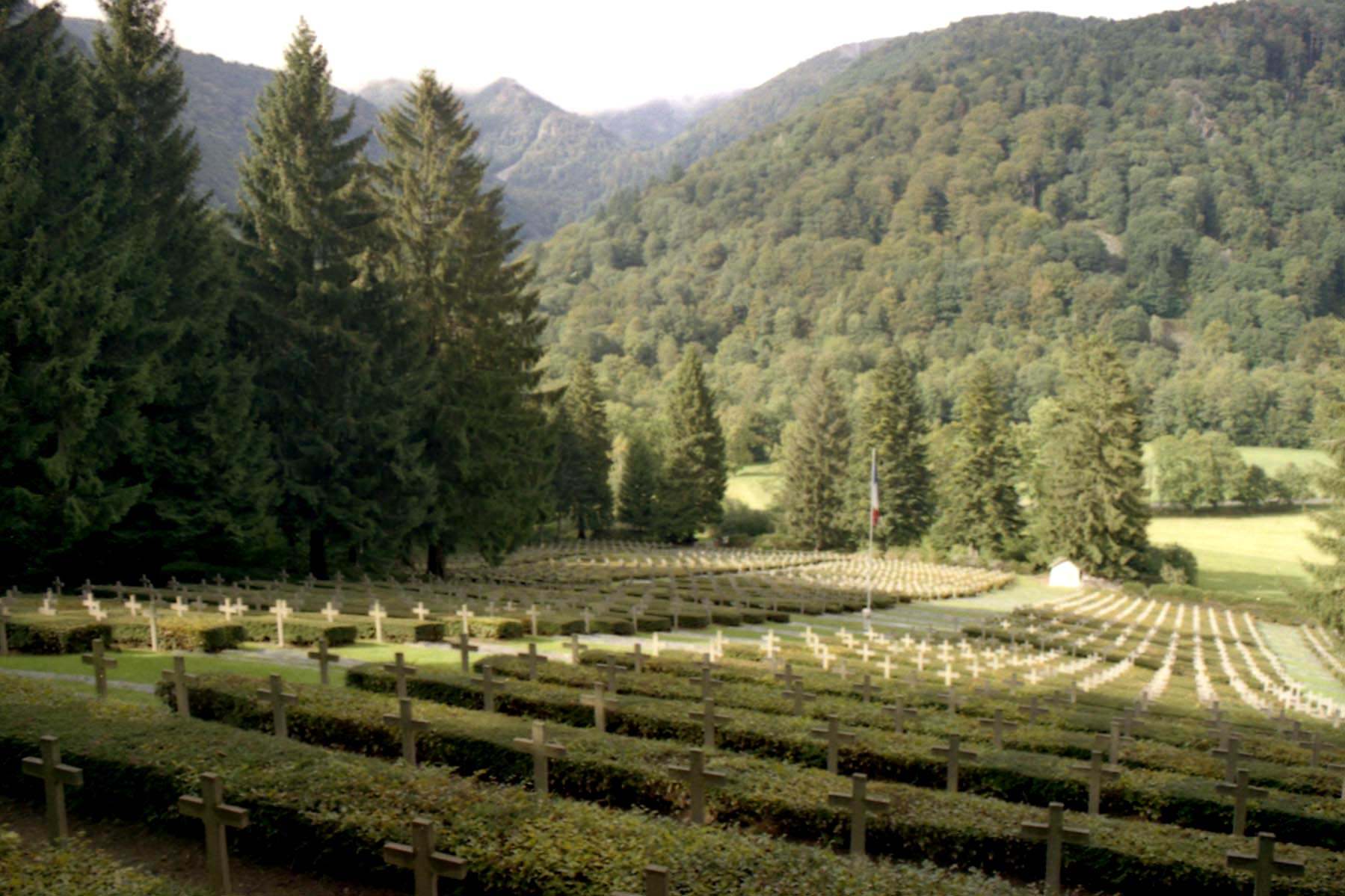
The French Military Cemetery at Chêne-Millet.

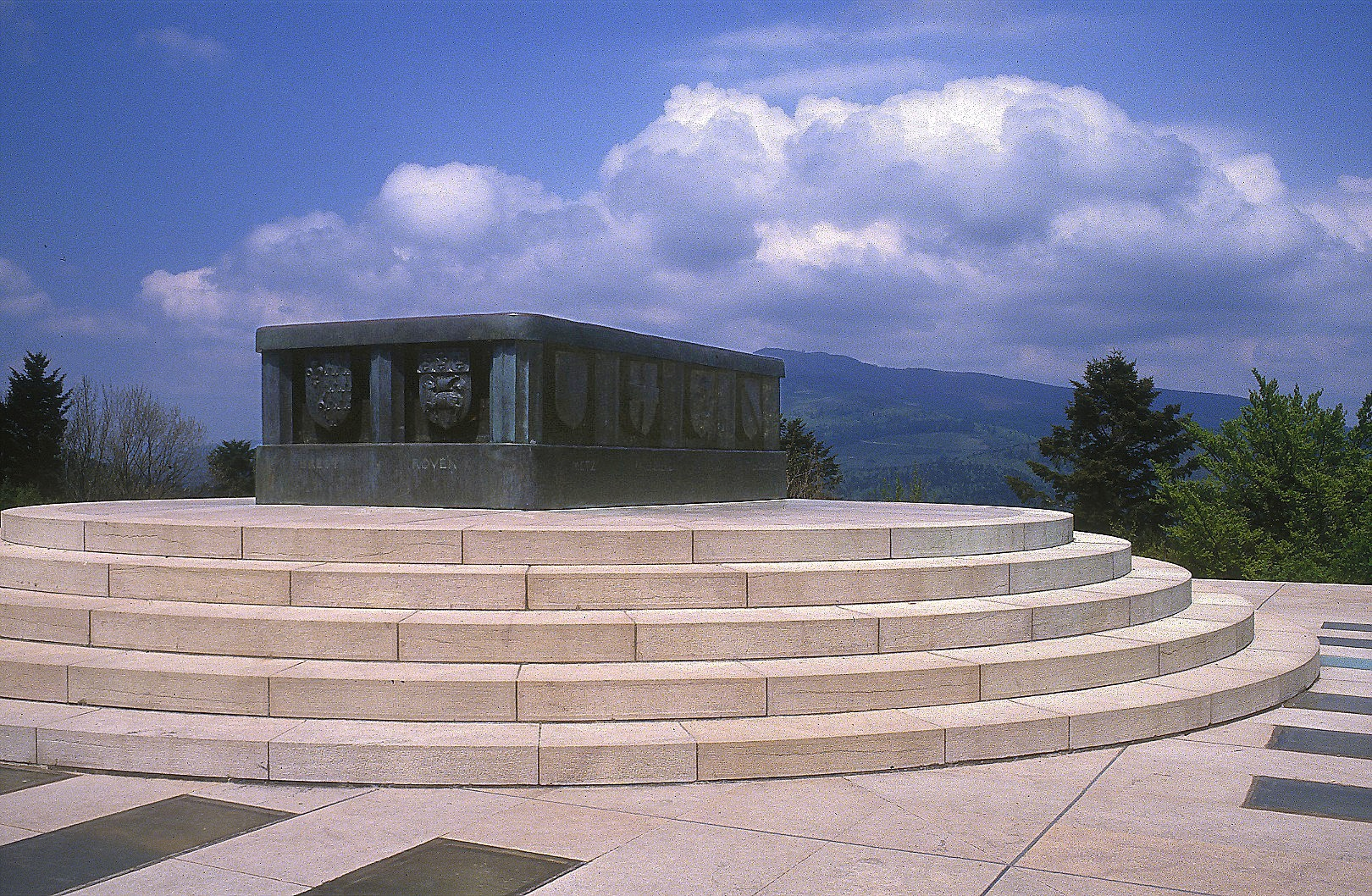
The crypt at Hartmannswillerkopf.

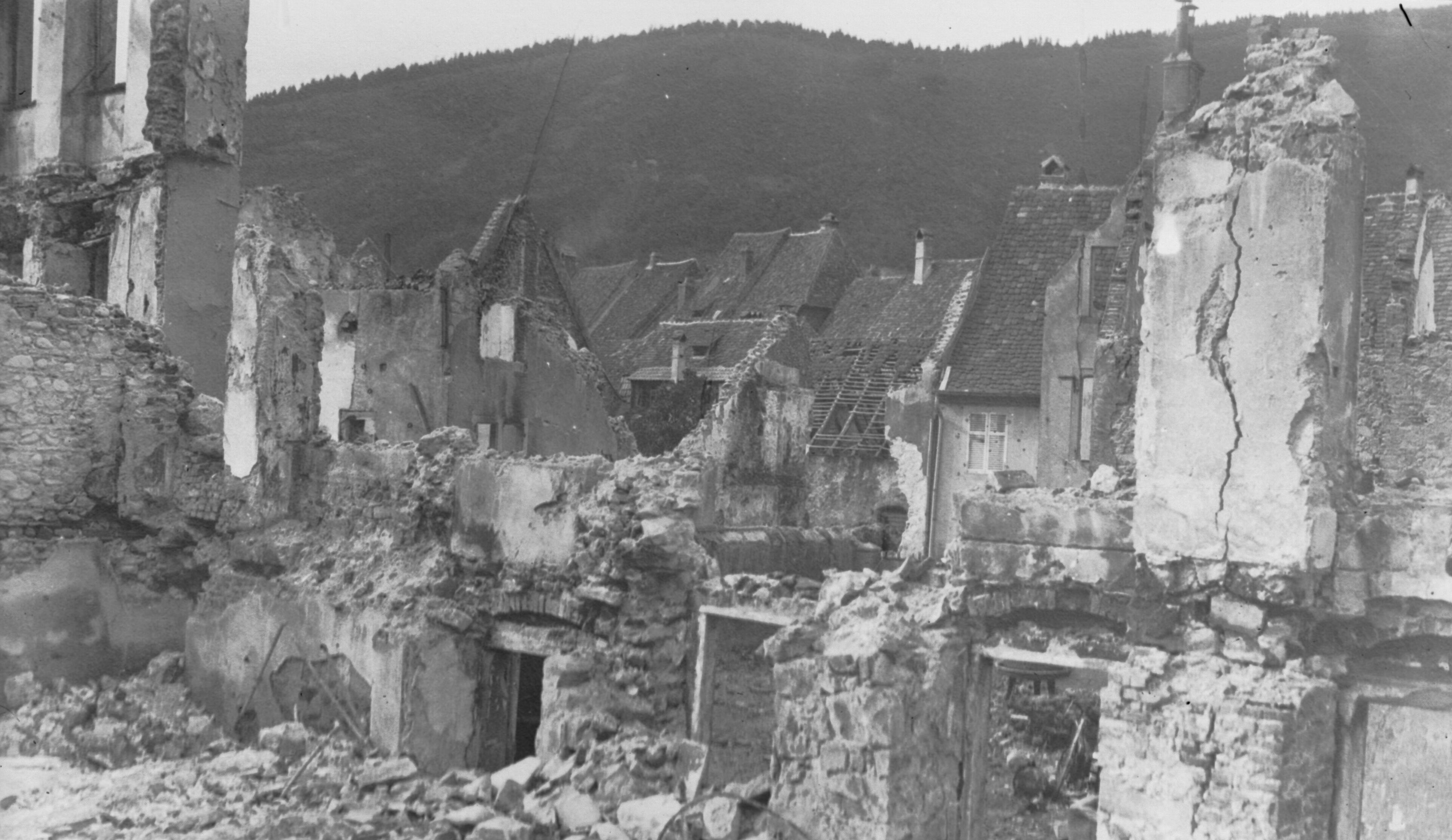
Thann in 1915 after German artillery bombardment.

== See also ==
- List of World War I memorials and cemeteries in Artois
- List of World War I memorials and cemeteries in Champagne-Ardennes
- List of World War I memorials and cemeteries in Flanders
- List of World War I Memorials and Cemeteries in Lorraine
- List of World War I memorials and cemeteries in the Somme
- List of World War I memorials and cemeteries in Verdun
- List of World War I memorials and cemeteries in the area of the St Mihiel salient
