= Emo de Medeiros =

Beninese artist

- Emo de Medeiros in 2024
- Website: www.emodemedeiros.com

Emo de Medeiros (born 1979) is a Beninese artist living and working in Paris, France and in Cotonou, Benin.

His work explores themes of transculturalism, transforming identities, post-colonial representations, and globalization as a worldwide hybridization and mutation. He also questions the African continent's transformations in the context of the digital revolution and the occurrence of a Pan-African 21st-century TransAfrica in transition between tradition and accelerated innovation.

== Background and education ==
After spending his childhood and teenage years in Cotonou, Benin, he moved to France to pursue an academic education. He graduated from Ecole Normale Supérieure in Paris where he studied history, sociology and anthropology, after which he continued his training at the Ecole Nationale Supérieure des Beaux-Arts also in Paris.

While in Beaux-arts he started focusing on digital arts: digital photography, graphic design, 3D modeling, digital video and interactive devices, and specifically explored the relationship between time and memory through the notion of instensity (intensity of the instant), linked to his experimental and electronic musical practice. After finishing art school he directed musical videos and experimental short films while pursuing his practice as a composer and producer of electronic music in Paris. He then moved to Boston, where he attended classes at the Massachusetts College of Art and Design, before returning to France and finally to Benin.

== Work ==
Emo de Medeiros' work crosses a variety of mediums, including photography, video, textile, painting, performance, and sculpture, and investigates themes of social and symbolic interactions, of the relationship to the digital civilization, of ethnicity and Panafricanism in a post-colonial context. He is sometimes associated with afrofuturism.

His practice is based on the notion of contexture, defined as the creation of artefacts based on interconnections between cultures, materials, concepts techniques and practices from diverse areas, eras, and uses. In particular his pieces often mix technological elements (such as connected devices) and forms from classical African art, notably from Benin, or fuse art genres such as installation and performance resulting for instance in the notion of performative installation in which the public represents a semantic element in its own right, such as Kaleta/Kaleta presented in Palais de Tokyo in 2014.

In 2015, while the Venice Biennale was taking place, Emo de Medeiros staged Pavillon du Bénin, subtitled The Future Unbound, a clandestine, ephemeral, unofficial and unlisted installation in the Giardini. Writing in Ecce Africa, Claude Biao noted that Benin had not rented an official pavilion and described the piece as an attempt to remedy this absence "by substituting the individual for the State", with clandestinity as its theme. The ephemeral piece was an ironic political commentary about the clandestine African vendor figure's absence in the works presented at the biennale, despite their highly visible presence in touristic towns in Italy, about the economic and symbolic power balance that makes the presence of national pavilions of African countries difficult, and about the controversy regarding the Kenyan Pavilion where most of the artists presented were Chinese.

His work has been shown in several solo and group shows in Benin, France, United Kingdom and South Africa. It was also presented at the Salon de Montrouge in 2013, at the Palais de Tokyo in Paris in 2014, at the Dakar Biennale and at the Arts in Marrakech (AiM) International Biennale in 2016.

== Exhibitions ==
=== 2021 ===
- 13th Gwangju biennale. Curators: Defne Ayas and Natasha Ginwala. Gwangju, South Korea
- Ex Africa. Curator: Philippe Dagen. Musée du Quai Branly, Paris, France.
- XXII Paiz Art Biennial. Curators: Gabriel Rodriguez et Alexia Tala. Guatemala City, Guatemala.
- Comme de longs échos. Curators: Jean-Michel Jagot et Julie Pellegrin. Garenne- Lemot/Musée Dobrée, Nantes, France.
- Rhizomes. Curator: Paula Nascimento. La Base Sous Marine, Bordeaux, France
- Ce qui s’oublie et ce qui reste. Curator: Meriem Berrada. Musée National de l'Histoire de l'Immigration, Paris, France.

=== 2020 ===
- Now Look Here (The African Art of Appearance). Curator : Renny Ramakers. New North, Amsterdam, Netherlands.
- Maison de Force. Curators : Marynet J. et Cléophée Moser, le Collectif Eaux Fortes. Aedaen Gallery, Strasbourg, France.

=== 2019 ===
- Cosmopolis #2.0: Rethinking the Human. Curator : Kathryn Weir. Centre Pompidou, Paris, France.
- 21st Contemporary Art Biennial Sesc_Videobrasil, Imagined Communities. Artistic Director : Solange Farkas. Curator : Gabriel Bogossian. Sao Paulo, Brasil.
- São Tomé Art Biennale VIII. Curator : Renny Ramakers. São Tomé and Principe, Brasil.
- TIIT, performance. Goethe Institut, Salvador de Bahia, Brasil.

=== 2018 ===
- Cosmopolis #1.5: Enlarged Intelligence, Curator : Kathryn Weir. Centre Pompidou, in collaboration with Mao Jihong Arts Foundation, Chengdu, China.
- Biennale de Casablanca 4th edition, Récits des bords de l’eau (Tales of water margins). Artistic director : Christine Eyene. Casablanca, Morocco.
- LagosPhoto Festival 2018. Curators : Eva Barois De Caevel, Wunika Mukan, Charlotte Langhorst et Valentine Umansky. Lagos, Nigeria.
- Chromatics, solo show, 50 Golborne Gallery, London, United Kingdom.
- Les pouvoirs des émotions. Curators : Laure Kaltenbach et Armelle Pasco. Centre Pompidou, Paris, France.
- Dak'art Biennale 13th edition, L’heure rouge / Une nouvelle humanité (The red hour / A new humanity). Artistic director : Simon Njami. Palais de Justice, Dakar, Senegal.
- Do Disturb, Festival of performing arts. Curator : Vittoria Matarrese. Palais de Tokyo, Paris, France.

=== 2017 ===
- Africa Aperta II, group show. Galerie Dominique Fiat, Paris, France.
- Videobrasil Contemporary Art Festival. Artistic director : Solange Farkas. Sao Paulo, Brasil.
- Digital Africa, group show. Curator : Christine Eyene. OGU MAG gallery, Tokyo, Japan.
- Die Schönheit im Anderen, group show. Curatour : Mark Gisbourne. Lieberose Castle, Germany.
- The Black Sphinx, group show. Primo Marella gallery, Milano, Italy.
- Flow of Forms/Forms of Flow, group show. Curators : Kerstin Pinther and Alexandra Weigand. Galerie Karen Wimmer, Munich, Germany.
- Afriques Capitales, group show. Curator : Simon Njami (installation proposal by Dominique Fiat), Grande Halle de La Villette, Paris, France.
- Vers le Cap de Bonne-Espérance, group show. Curateur : Simon Njami. Gare Saint-Sauveur, Lille, France.
- Le Havre - Dakar, partager la mémoire, group show. Curator : Cédric Crémière. Muséum d'histoire naturelle, Le Havre, France.

=== 2016 ===
- Transpositions, 50 Golborne gallery, London, United Kingdom
- Transmutations, Backslash gallery, Paris, France
- 12th Dakar Biennale, Witnesses of the Invisible, Dakar, Senegal
- 6th Marrakech Biennale, "Not New Now", Marrakech, Marocco

=== 2015 ===
- All things magic, RSF gallery, Paris, France
- Venice Biennale Off, Benin Pavilion, Venice, Italy
- Vodunaut, Centre Arts et Cultures, Abomey-Calavi, Benin

=== 2014 ===
- Kaleta/Kaleta, Palais de Tokyo, Paris, France

=== 2013 ===
- Black Light Sanctuary, 58th Salon de Montrouge, Montrouge, France
