= Temitayo Ogunbiyi =

Nigerian-based contemporary artist and curator

- Born: 1984 (age 41–42); Rochester, New York, U.S.
- Education: University of Nottingham; Columbia University
- Occupations: Contemporary artist; curator
- Known for: Exhibition at the Museo d’Arte Contemporanea Donnaregina, Naples, Italy
- Website: https://www.temitayo.com/

Temitayo Ogunbiyi (born 1984) is a Nigerian-based contemporary artist and curator. She is known for her exhibitions in several museums, the most popular being the playground installed at Italy's Museo d’Arte Contemporanea Donnaregina in 2020, known as You Can Play in the Everyday, Running.

== Early life and education ==
Ogunbiyi was born in 1984 in Rochester, New York. She grew up in Gwynedd and attended Wissahickon High School in Montgomery County, Pennsylvania. She earned a BA from Princeton University, New Jersey, in 2006 and later received her master's degree in art history from Columbia University, New York, in 2011. She currently lives and works in Lagos, Nigeria, and has lived there for the past nine years.

== Career ==
In 2012, her art was featured at the Pulitzer Foundation for the Arts, St Louis and the Centre for Contemporary Art, Lagos. She exhibited at the Museum of Contemporary Diasporan Art in Lagos in 2013, followed by exhibits at Tiwani Contemporary, London in 2016 and in the second Lagos Biennial of Contemporary Art in 2019. Her art has also appeared in the Museum of Contemporary African Diasporan Arts in Brooklyn, New York, the Perm Art Museum in Russia, the Dom Umenia Bratislava in Slovakia, and the Berlin Art Projects and the Fries Museum in Berlin.

Ogunbiyi has constructed three functional playgrounds to date. She built her first one, using both construction materials and conventional household items, in 2018. That year her playground project was featured in a curatorial publication commissioned for the tenth Berlin Biennale. In November 2019, she constructed a playground titled You Will Find Playgrounds Among the Palm Trees for the second Lagos biennial. The playground was built to represent the voyage of enslaved Africans to Colombia. It led to the commission of her 2020 exhibition in Italy by Kathryn Weir, the then director of the Museo d'Arte Contemporanea Donnaregina in Naples.

The 2020 playground was titled You Will Play in the Everyday, Running (Italian: Giocherai nel Quotidiano, Correndo?) and was installed at the Museo d’Arte Contemporanea Donnaregina (Italian Contemporary Art Museum) in Naples. It features random lines and iron bars which visually reference the home-built body building equipment traditionally improvised by men in Lagos. References to the art of Louise Bourgeois and Tim Burton are used to represent a transport link between Lagos and Naples. The playground also conceptualizes the cooking traditions of the Campania region where the museum is located.

== Awards ==
Ogunbiyi is a recipient of numerous fellowships and awards, including a Smithsonian Artist in Research Fellowship and a Ford Foundation Fellowship. Ogunibiyi was 2020-21 Digital Earth Fellow

== Selected exhibitions ==
- Temitayo Ogunbiyi: You will wonder if we would have been friends, Noguchi Museum, Long Island City, New York (2025)
- 12th Berlin Biennale, Berlin, Germany (2022)
- You will play in nuance and grow community, Van Abbe Museum, Eindhoven, Netherlands (2022)
- Capillarité, 31 Project, Paris, France (2019)
- You Will Find Peace and Play Among Palm Trees, Freedom Park Playground, Lagos, Nigeria (2018)
- Nothing in Nature is Private, Medium Tings Gallery, Brooklyn, New York, USA (2017)
- A Nightmare's Daydreams, Freedom Park, Lagos, Nigeria (2014)
- Am I a Thief?, the Fries Museum, Berlin (2012)
- Extended Extensions, Lucas Gallery, Princeton University, Princeton (2006)
