= Christine Eyene =

French art critic

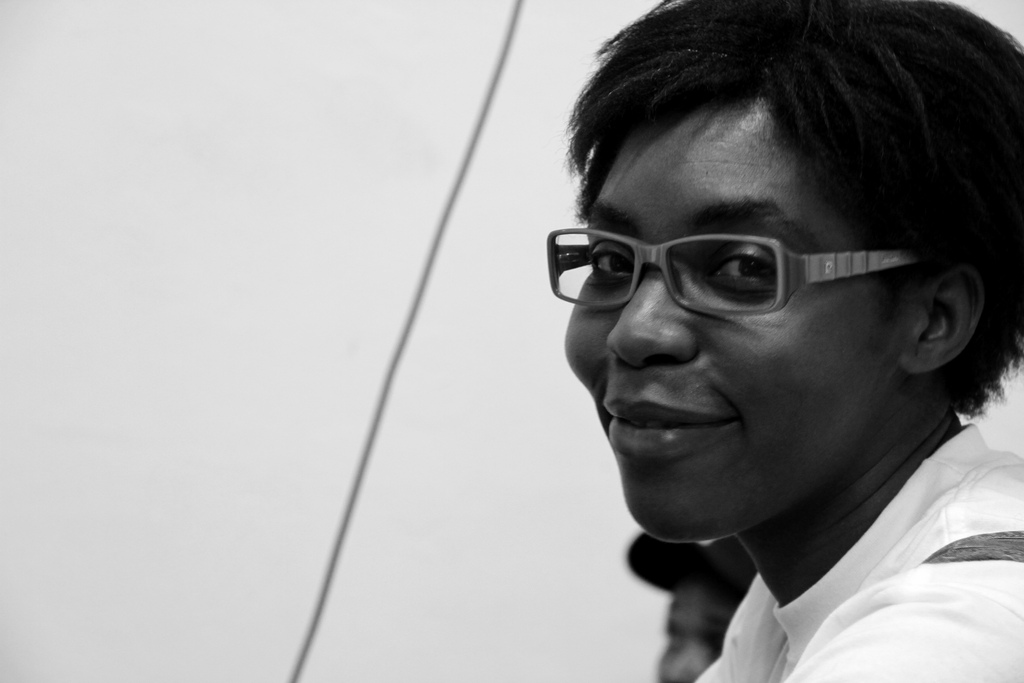
- Born: 1970 (age 55–56); Paris, France
- Education: DEA, Université Panthéon-Sorbonne
- Occupations: Art critic, art historian, and curator

Christine Eyene (born Paris, 1970) is a Cameroonian art critic, art historian, and curator.

== Biography ==
Born in 1970 in Paris, Christine Eyene studied the history of art at the Panthéon-Sorbonne University, also in Paris. She obtained a Diplôme d’Études Approfondies (DEA) in 1999, under the supervision of Philippe Dagen, and wrote a dissertation entitled Image and Body: representing the body in South African art from the 1960s to 1990s. She then pursued research on contemporary South African art with, as her main subject, the history of artists exiled during apartheid and their cultural exchange with the black diaspora in France and England. She is particularly interested in the painters Ernest Mancoba and Gerard Sekoto. Her other research topics also include themes such as body representation, gender in art, and urban culture.

In 2000, she worked for the French Institute in Rabat, with the curator Nadine Descendre. In 2002, she also became one of the journalists for the review Africultures, working in the field of visual arts. In 2010, she began a career as an independent curator, as had other art critics, such as Simon Njami, and Okwui Enwezor, who contributed to a dynamic on contemporary art and highlighted African creators. She works for various institutions, notably as an exhibition curator for the FOCUS - Contemporary Art Africa exhibition in Basel, on the selection of African photographers at Photoquai, in Paris in 2011, and, with other curators, for the Dakar Biennale in 2012. In 2012, she was in Londonfor the Roma-Sinti-Kale-Manush exhibition.

In 2012, she joined the Making Histories Visible team, an artistic research project of the Center for Contemporary Art at the University of Central Lancashire (UCLan) with the mission of carrying out innovative curatorial projects, in collaboration with museums and contemporary artists.
