= 152nd Infantry Division (France) =

- 152e division d'infanterie
- Divisional insignia
- Active: 1915 - 1990
- Country: France
- Branch: Infantry
- Garrison/HQ: Plateau d'Albion
- Engagements: World War I World War II: Battle of France; Cold War

The 152nd Infantry Division (French: 152^{e} division d'infanterie) was a formation of the French Army. It saw service in the First World War, Second World War, and during the Cold War, when it guarded the intercontinental ballistic missile bases on the Plateau d'Albion.

Before its disestablishment during the 1990s, it included the 152ème R.C.S., the 19ème Régiment de Chasseurs (Draguignan), the 86ème R.I. (Issoire), the 4ème R.I.Ma (Fréjus), the 24ème R.I.Ma (Perpignan), and the 19ème R.A. (Draguignan).

== References and external links ==
- David Isby and Charles Kamps, Armies of NATO's Central Front, Jane's Publishing Company, 1985
- AFGG, vol. 2, t. 10 : Ordres de bataille des grandes unités : divisions d'infanterie, divisions de cavalerie, 1924, 1092 p.
- Battle of the Aisne @ Collectif de Recherche International et de Débat sur la guerre de 1914-1918
