= Temitayo Shokunbi =

Professor Matthew Temitayo Shokunbi
- Born: Matthew Temitayo Shokunbi
- Citizenship: Nigerian
- Occupations: Consultant Neurological surgeon at the University College Hospital, Ibadan.; Professor of Anatomy
- Spouse: Professor (Mrs) Wuraola Shokunbi
- Awards: Matsumae International Foundation Fellow at the Meiji Institute of Health, Odawara, and the Congenital Anomalies Research Centre, Kyoto University, Kyoto, Japan. December, 1990-January, 1991. Visiting Research Scientist, The National Institute of Genetics, Mishima, Japan. January, 1995-January, 1996..etc..

Matthew Temitayo Shokunbi is a Nigerian neurosurgeon and professor of anatomy.

He got his MBBS degree at the University of Ibadan shortly after completing his A levels after which he started a residency program in Neurosurgery in Ontario, Canada. He is a lecturer in Anatomy at the University of Ibadan, and in Neurological surgery at the University College Hospital, Ibadan where he also doubles as an Honorary Consultant Neurosurgeon.
