= Lapoutroie =

Commune in Grand Est, France

- Commune
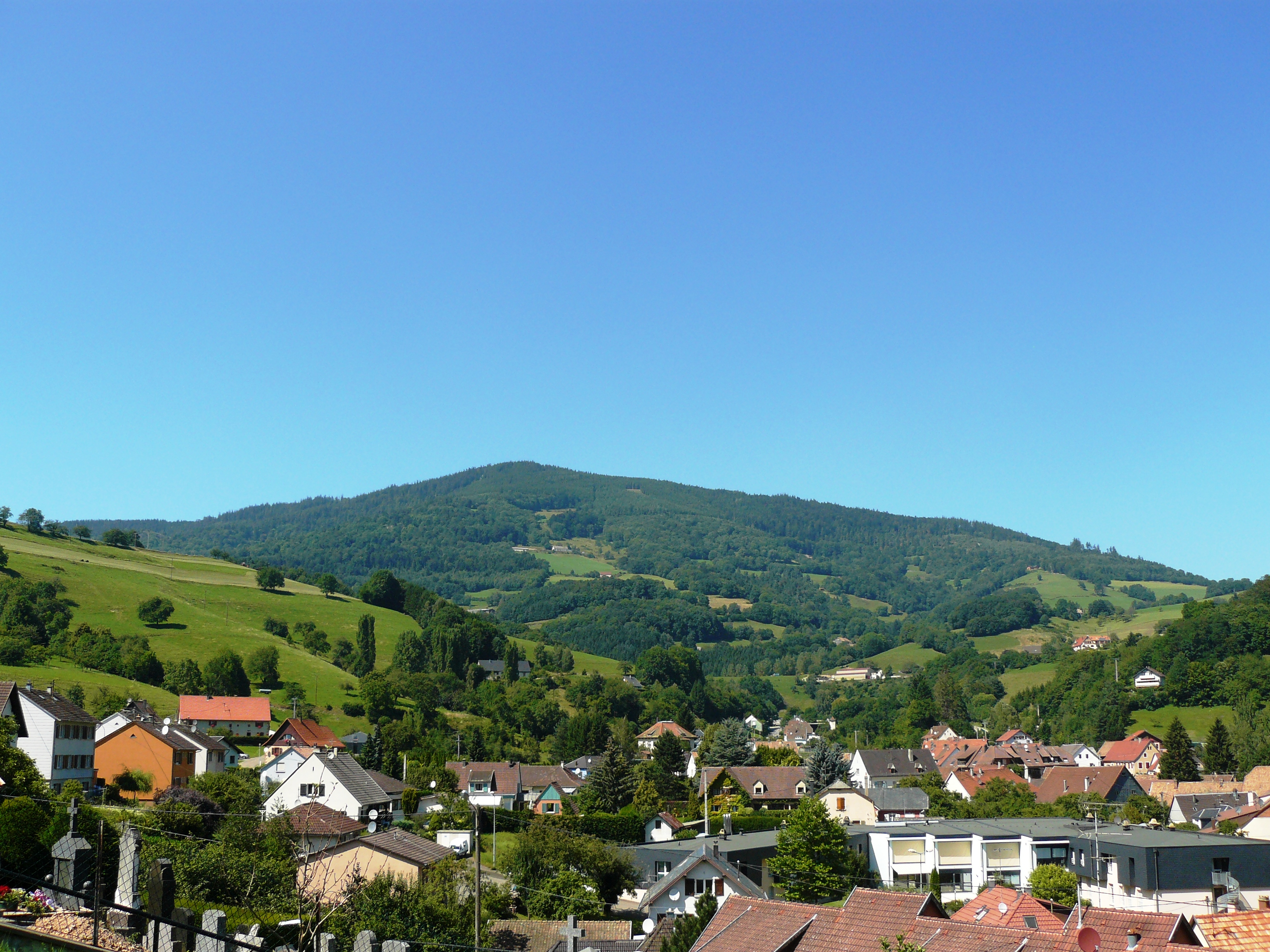
- A general view of Lapoutroie

- Coat of arms
- Location of Lapoutroie
- Location within France Location within Grand Est
- Coordinates: 48°09′12″N 7°10′13″E
- Country: France
- Region: Grand Est
- Department: Haut-Rhin
- Arrondissement: Colmar-Ribeauvillé
- Canton: Sainte-Marie-aux-Mines
- Intercommunality: Vallée de Kaysersberg

Government
  - Mayor (2020–2026): Philippe Girardin
- Area^{1}: 21.12 km^{2} (8.15 sq mi)
- Elevation: 422 m (1,385 ft)
- Highest elevation: 1,221 m (4,006 ft)
- Lowest elevation: 329 m (1,079 ft)
- Population (2023): 1,881
  - Density: 89.06/km^{2} (230.7/sq mi)
- Time zone: UTC+01:00 (CET)
  - Summer (DST): UTC+02:00 (CEST)
- INSEE/Postal code: 68175 /68650
- ^{1} French Land Register data, which excludes lakes, ponds, glaciers > 1 km^{2} (0.386 sq mi or 247 acres) and river estuaries.

Lapoutroie (French pronunciation: [laputʁwa]; German: Schnierlach; Welche: Lè Peutraille) is a commune in the Haut-Rhin department in Grand Est in north-eastern France.

== History ==
At the beginning of the 12th century, Lapoutroie was called Sconerloch. The first villagers were probably coal traders who settled along the road. In 1348, the place was called Poutroye and subsequently developed into a political center of the region. A court and a prison were established there, and criminals sentenced to death were hanged. In the early 16th century, about 70 people lived there, and by 1632, during the Thirty Years' War, the population had reached 206. In 1681, the number of inhabitants had dropped to 36. That same year, 18 houses in Ribeaugoutte were destroyed by fire. In 1732, Lapoutroie had a recorded population of 876. On 2 September 1750, in the late afternoon, a lightning strike destroyed the church, which dated from 1502, and 22 other houses.

== Tourism ==
In the northern part of the village is the Musée des Eaux de Vie, a spirits museum housed in the former 18th-century post station. The exhibits illustrate the production of spirits and liqueurs, from the fruit to the finished distillate. The museum is privately managed. Admission is free, and tastings are available.

== See also ==
- Communes of the Haut-Rhin département
