= Kathryn Weir =

British-Australian curator and writer

- Born: Kathryn Elizabeth Weir; 1967 (age 58–59); Oxford, England
- Occupations: Art historian, curator and writer
- Known for: Cosmopolis; director of the Madre Museum; department director at the Centre Pompidou

Kathryn Elizabeth Weir (born 1967) is a British-Australian art historian, curator and writer. She has held senior curatorial positions at the Gallery of Modern Art (QAGOMA) in Brisbane, the Centre Pompidou in Paris, as well as directorship of the Museo d'Arte Contemporanea Donnaregina in Naples. Her curatorial practice has engaged with research-based and collaborative artistic practices, moving image, performance, technology, race, class, gender and political ecology.

== Career ==
Weir worked previously at the National Gallery of Australia in Canberra, and from 2006 to 2014 was head curator of international contemporary art at the Gallery of Modern Art (QAGOMA) Brisbane. Around the same period, she was the curatorial manager of the Australian Cinémathèque, an Associate Member of the International Federation of Film Archives located within the Gallery of Modern Art. Additionally, she was a member of the curatorium of the 5th, 6th and 7th Asia Pacific Triennial of Contemporary Art.

At QAGOMA, Kathryn Weir curated and contributed to exhibitions and film programmes including Kiss of the Beast: From Paris Salon to King Kong (2005-2006), The Leisure Class (2007–2008), Modern Ruin (2008), 21st Century: Art in the First Decade (2010–2011), Sculpture Is Everything (2012), Tracey Moffatt: Spirited (2014) and Sublime: Passages to the Infinite (2014–2015).

From 2014 to 2019, Weir was director of the department of cultural development at the Centre Pompidou. In 2015 she founded Cosmopolis, a platform for research based, socially engaged and collaborative artistic practices. She also created MOVE: performance, dance, moving image, an annual festival at the Centre Pompidou.

In January 2020, Kathryn Weir became director of the Museo d'Arte Contemporanea Donnaregina in Naples, succeeding Andrea Viliani. She directed the museum from 2020 to 2023. At Madre she curated projects including Rethinking Nature (2021–2022), with associate curator Ilaria Conti, and Jimmie Durham: humanity is not a completed project (2022–2023).

Weir was co-artistic director of the 2024 Lagos Biennial with Folakunle Oshun. She has also taught Curatorial Studies at Nuova Accademia di Belle Arti in Rome.

== Selected publications ==
- "Terra nullius, terra mobilis: When the Earth Sends Signs" in Weir, Kathryn; Paukner, Hélia; Lascols, Enguerrand (eds.), Clément Cogitore: The Ephemeral Island. Paris: Atelier EXB, 2025. pp. 289-298
- "Lagos Biennial 2024: Reflections on Refuge" in Oshun, Folakunle (ed.), The Making of an African Capital of Culture: Lagos Biennial I–IV. Lagos: Àkéte Art Foundation, 2025. pp. 44–49.
- Beauty and Terror: Sites of Fascism and Colonialism. Naples: Arte'm. 2023. ISBN 9788856909463.
- Rethinking Nature. Naples: Arte'm. 2024. ISBN 9788856909494.
- Utopia Dystopia: The Myth of Progress Seen from the South. Naples: Arte'm. 2023. ISBN 9788856909500.
- "Claire Tabouret: The Medusa's Gaze". Claire Tabouret: I Am Spacious, Singing Flesh. Milan: Mousse Publishing. 2022. ISBN 9788867495382.
- "Triple Cross: Bycroft's BIOPIC". Madison Bycroft: BIOPIC, or Charles Geneviève Louis Auguste André Timothée. Adelaide: Anne & Gordon Samstag Museum of Art. 2021. ISBN 9780645256000.
- "The Collective Body" with Campbell Betancourt, Diana in Dhaka Art Summit 2020: Seismic Movements. Dhaka: Samdani Art Foundation, 2020.
- "Treating Rocks as if They Matter: A Conversation around Mel O'Callaghan's Centre of the Centre" with Povinelli, Elizabeth in Mel O'Callaghan: Centre of the Centre. Sydney: Artspace, 2019. ISBN 9780646812694.
- "Enlarged Intelligence: Cosmotechnics and Ecological Awareness. A Conversation around Cosmopolis #1.5" with Hui, Yuk in Cosmopolis #1.5: Enlarged Intelligence. Chengdu: Centre Pompidou and Mao Jihong Arts Foundation, 2018.
- "Clarisse Hahn: Naked Truths and the Last Judgement". Clarisse Hahn: Politiques de la présence. Milan: Mousse Publishing. 2018. ISBN 9788867493234.
- "Walking the Talk: Cabello/Carceller's Rapping Philosophy". Cabello/Carceller. Madrid: Centro de Arte Dos de Mayo. 2017. ISBN 9788445136058.
- "Empire and Eternal Peace". Andy Warhol | Ai Weiwei. Melbourne: National Gallery of Victoria. 2015. pp. 205–232. ISBN 9780724104192.
- Sculpture Is Everything. Brisbane: Queensland Art Gallery / Gallery of Modern Art. 2012. ISBN 9781921503474.
- "Here, Now and Forever". Ho Tzu Nyen: The Cloud of Unknowing. Singapore: National Arts Council. 2011. ISBN 9789810885106.
- "In This Together: The Aesthetics of Inclusion" in Wallace, Miranda (ed.), 21st Century: Art in the First Decade. Brisbane: Queensland Art Gallery / Gallery of Modern Art, 2010. pp. 24–33.
- "The Hungry Goat: Iranian Animation, Media Archaeology and Located Visual Worlds". The 6th Asia Pacific Triennial of Contemporary Art. Brisbane: Queensland Art Gallery / Gallery of Modern Art. 2009. pp. 50–57. ISBN 9781921503085.
- The View from Elsewhere. Sydney: Sherman Contemporary Art Foundation, 2009. ISBN 9780957738249.
- Modern Ruin. Brisbane: Australian Cinémathèque / Gallery of Modern Art. 2008. ISBN 9781876509453.
- With Gott, Ted. Kiss of the Beast: From Paris Salon to King Kong. Brisbane: Australian Cinémathèque / Queensland Art Gallery, 2005. ISBN 9781876509088.
- With Chambers, Nicholas. Video Hits: Art & Music Video. Brisbane: Queensland Art Gallery, 2004. ISBN 9781876509859.
