= Museo d'Arte Contemporanea Donnaregina =

- Museo d'arte contemporanea Donnaregina
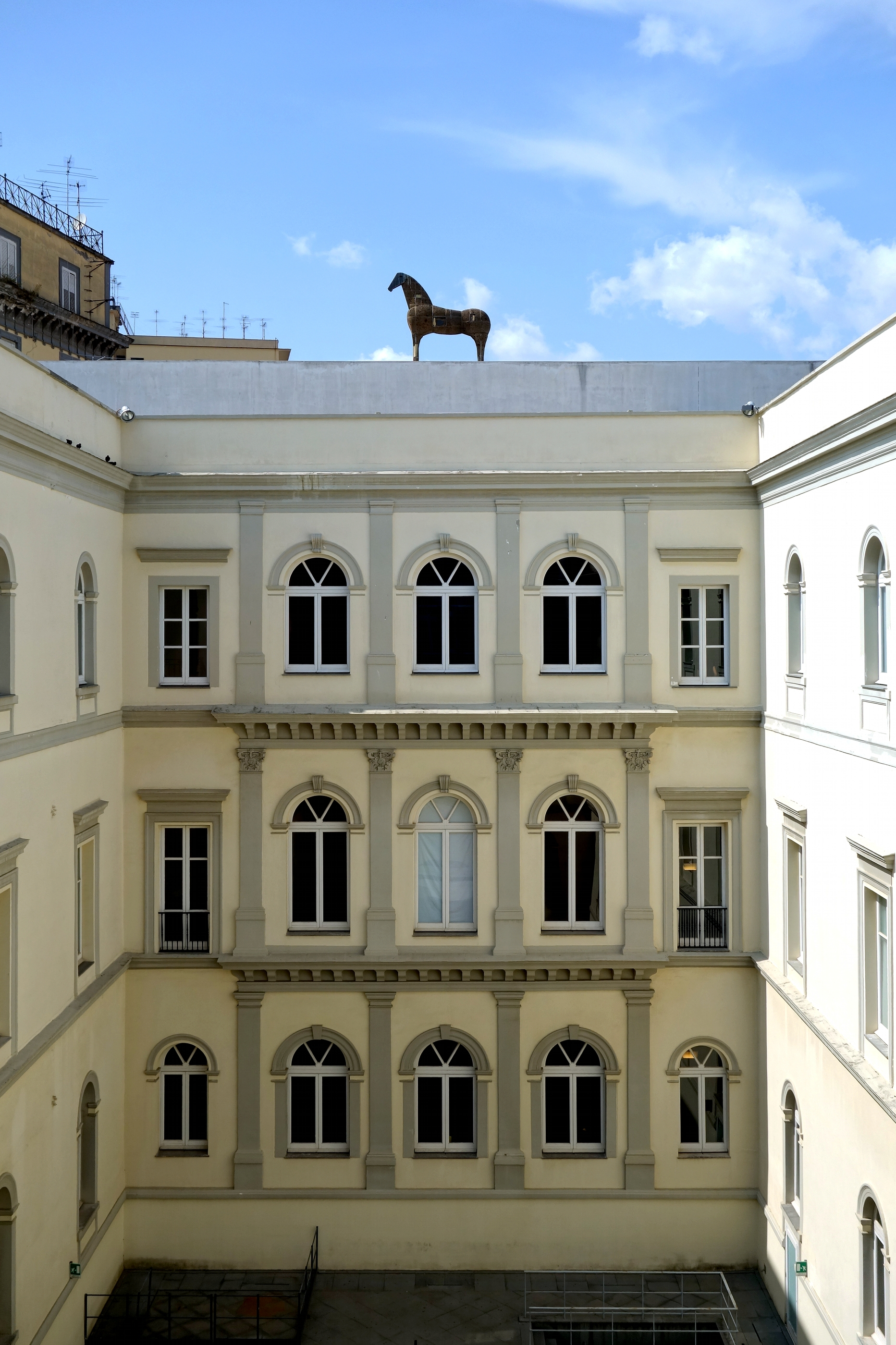
- The interior courtyard, with Cavallo by Mimmo Paladino outlined against the sky
- Former name: Donnaregina Contemporary Art Museum, Madre Museum
- Established: 2005
- Location: via Luigi Settembrini, 79, Naples
- Coordinates: 40.8549°N 14.2587°E
- Type: museum of contemporary art
- Visitors: 64000 (2016)
- Website: www.madrenapoli.it

The Museo d'Arte Contemporanea Donnaregina, often known as Museo Madre, or Donnaregina Contemporary Art Museum, is a museum of contemporary art in Naples, in Campania in southern Italy. It is housed in the Palazzo Donnaregina, which was adapted for it by the Portuguese architect Álvaro Siza Vieira. The museum opened in 2005.

== About ==
Among the artists represented in the permanent collections are or were Sol LeWitt, Jeff Koons, Mimmo Paladino, Richard Long, Andy Warhol, Gilbert & George (Shitty World), Lucio Fontana, Anish Kapoor, Jannis Kounellis, Giulio Paolini, Francesco Clemente, Rebecca Horn, Mario Merz, Damien Hirst and Olafur Eliasson. The museum also mounts temporary exhibitions. The museum is organised on four floors of the palace;| on the roof terrace is Cavallo, a sculpture by Mimmo Paladino which the museum bought in 2007.

Access to the church of Santa Maria Donnaregina Vecchia is through the museum.

== Controversy ==
The museum has been the subject of considerable controversy. In 2009 the million-euro budget of the exhibition Barock led to a public dispute between Eduardo Cicelyn, at that time director of the museum, and Guido Cabib, an art dealer. In February 2011 the entire board of management of the Fondazione Donnaregina resigned. Artists and institutions which had sent works to the museum on permanent loan asked for them to be returned – requests were received for the return of 86 of the 104 works in the collection. Cicelyn estimated the transport costs at €100,000, and the insurance value of the works at more than €5000 million.
