= Jamagne =

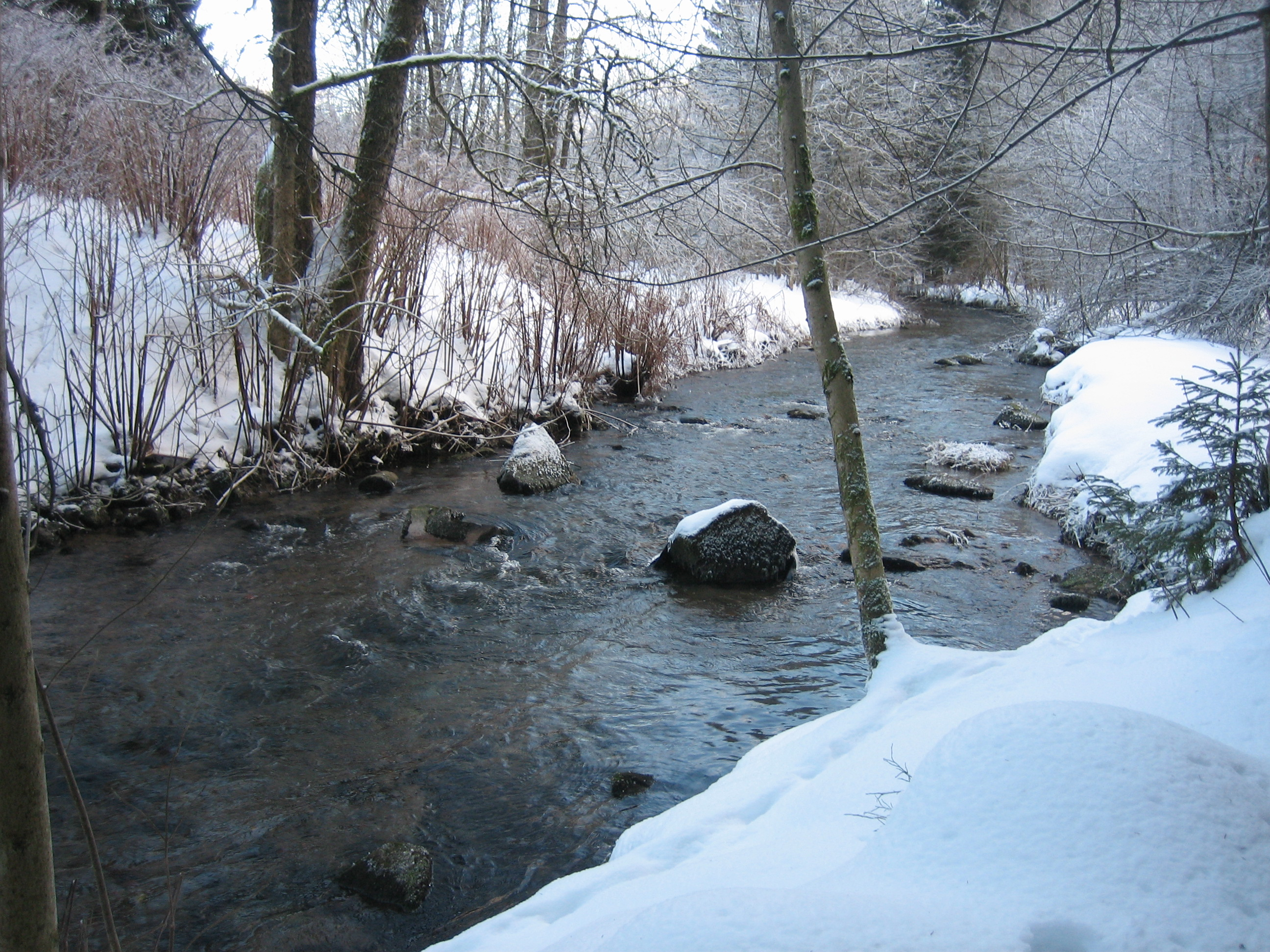
- The Jamagne at Kichompré

- Location within France Location within Grand Est

Location
- Country: France

Physical characteristics
- Source
  - location: Lac de Gérardmer
  - elevation: 660 m (2,170 ft)
- Mouth: Vologne
  - coordinates: 48.0933°N 6.884°E
  - elevation: 620 m (2,030 ft)
- Length: 6.9 km (4.3 mi)
- Basin size: 24.6 km^{2} (9.5 mi^{2})

Basin features
- Progression: Vologne→ Moselle→ Rhine→ North Sea

The Jamagne is a short river of 6.9 kilometres (4.3 mi), an emissary of the lac de Gérardmer which is its source. It flows into the Vologne as a left tributary at Kichompré.

== Etymology ==
The name Jamagne came from Ja-magna meaning "already big" by analogy with its outlet from the lake.

== Geography ==
The course of the Jamagne is largely canalized and rectilinear when it flows through the Gérardmer area, following the construction of Route nationale 417 in 1950. The river suffered from serious domestic pollution until 1998.

When the Cleurie river valley was blocked by Würmian moraine in a double vallum 50 metres (160 ft) thick, the waters of the Hohneck massif stopped flowing towards le Tholy and accumulated upstream of the deposit, forming the lac de Gérardmer. With no outlet to the west, the waters left the lake in the opposite direction to their historic one, via the Jamagne, which flows into the Vologne downstream of the hamlet of Kichompré.

The flow of the Jamagne was widely exploited during the 20th century for generating electricity as well as for powering sawmills which were set up on its banks.

In contrast to other rivers of the Vosges, the Jamagne is unique in flowing from southwest to northeast.

== Tributaries ==
The Jamagne's principal tributary is the Basse des Rupts, also known as the Forgotte. However the lac de Gérardmer is fed by four main streams:

- The Cheny stream (to the east)
- The Chêne stram (to the north)
- The Phény stream (to the south)
- The Mérelle stream (to the west)

According to the Sandre website, the Mérelle stream is identified as the mother branch of the Jamagne upstream of the lac de Gérardmer. Nonetheless, the path of the Phény stream accumulated with the lower part of the Jamagne amounts to a total length of 9 kilometres (6 mi).

== Hydrology ==
It appears that the fluctuations in flow rate of the Jamagne have never been studied. The flow of the river has been regulated since the beginning of the 20th century by a system of valves located at the outlet of the lac de Gérardmer.
