= Lac de Retournemer =

Glacial lake in France

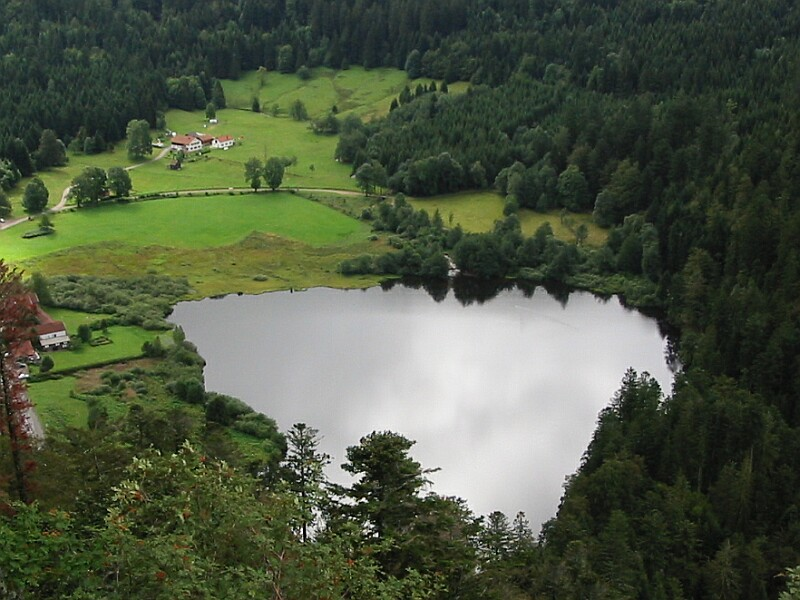

- Location within France
- Location: Xonrupt, Vosges
- Coordinates: 48°03′26″N 06°59′01″E
- Type: glacial
- Primary outflows: Vologne
- Basin countries: France
- Surface area: 0.05 km^{2} (0.019 sq mi)
- Average depth: 11.5 m (38 ft)
- Surface elevation: 776 m (2,546 ft)

Lac de Retournemer is a lake in Xonrupt, Vosges, France. At an elevation of 776 m, its surface area is 0.05 km^{2}. It has an area of 5 hectares, or about 12.3 acres.
