= Villers-lès-Nancy =

- Commune
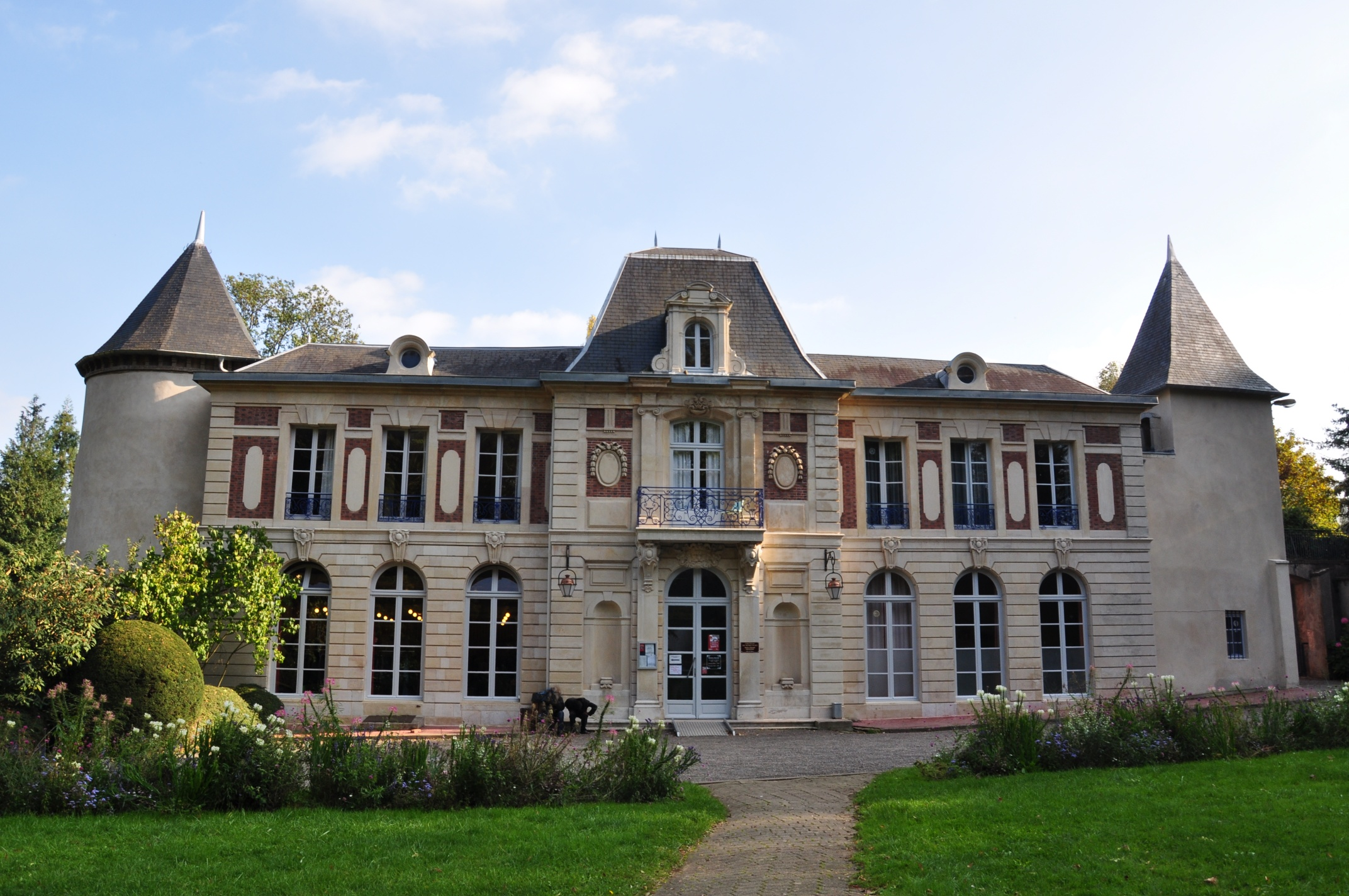
- The Remicourt chateau in Villers-lès-Nancy

- Coat of arms
- Location of Villers-lès-Nancy
- Location within France Location within Grand Est
- Coordinates: 48°40′23″N 6°09′17″E
- Country: France
- Region: Grand Est
- Department: Meurthe-et-Moselle
- Arrondissement: Nancy
- Canton: Laxou
- Intercommunality: Métropole du Grand Nancy

Government
  - Mayor (2020–2026): François Werner
- Area^{1}: 9.95 km^{2} (3.84 sq mi)
- Elevation: 285 m (935 ft)
- Highest elevation: 381 m (1,250 ft)
- Lowest elevation: 224 m (735 ft)
- Population (2023): 14,718
  - Density: 1,480/km^{2} (3,830/sq mi)
- Time zone: UTC+01:00 (CET)
  - Summer (DST): UTC+02:00 (CEST)
- INSEE/Postal code: 54578 /54600
- ^{1} French Land Register data, which excludes lakes, ponds, glaciers > 1 km^{2} (0.386 sq mi or 247 acres) and river estuaries.

Villers-lès-Nancy (French pronunciation: [vilɛʁ lɛ nɑ̃si], literally Villers near Nancy) is a commune in the Meurthe-et-Moselle department in north-eastern France.

Inhabitants are known as Villarois.

== Geography ==
Villers-lès-Nancy is a suburb on the southwest of Nancy. The commune goes from Nancy to the Haye forest.

It is composed of three quarters :

- the Mairie-Placieux quarter, which is the closest to Nancy,
- the Botanique-Village quarter, which goes from the Jardin botanique du Montet to the Brabois plateau,
- the Clairlieu quarter, in a large opening of the Haye forest, beyond the A 33.

The neighbourhood communes of the Grand Nancy are : Laxou, Nancy and Vandœuvre-lès-Nancy.

== Population ==
Historical population
Year	Pop.	±% p.a.
1968	7,811	—
1975	14,084	+8.79%
1982	16,120	+1.95%
1990	16,515	+0.30%
1999	15,694	−0.56%
2007	15,115	−0.47%
2012	14,386	−0.98%
2017	14,415	+0.04%
2023	14,718	+0.35%
Source: INSEE

== Points of interest ==
- Jardin botanique du Montet
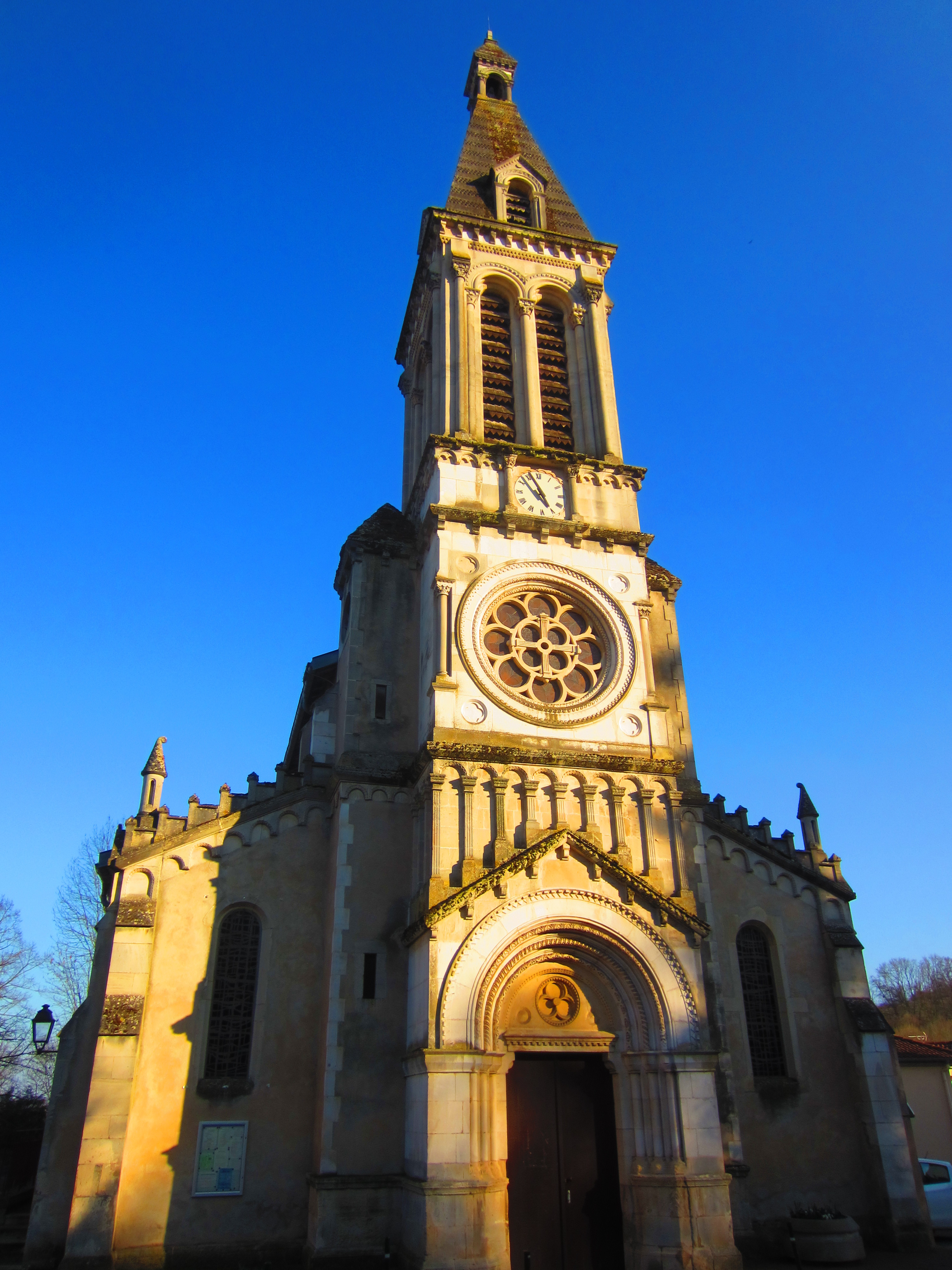
Church of Saint-Fiacre.

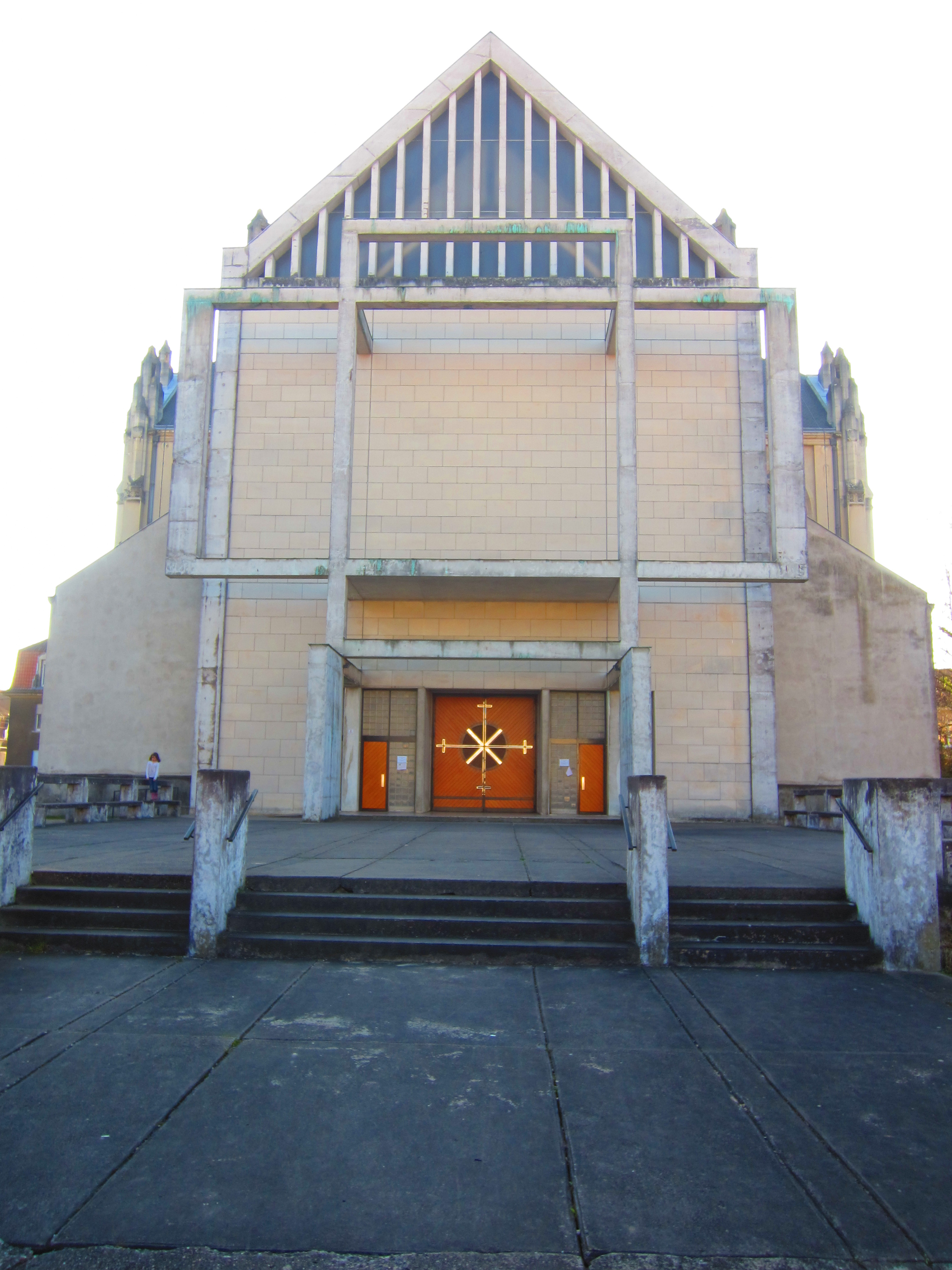
Church of Sainte-Thérèse-de-l'enfant-Jésus.

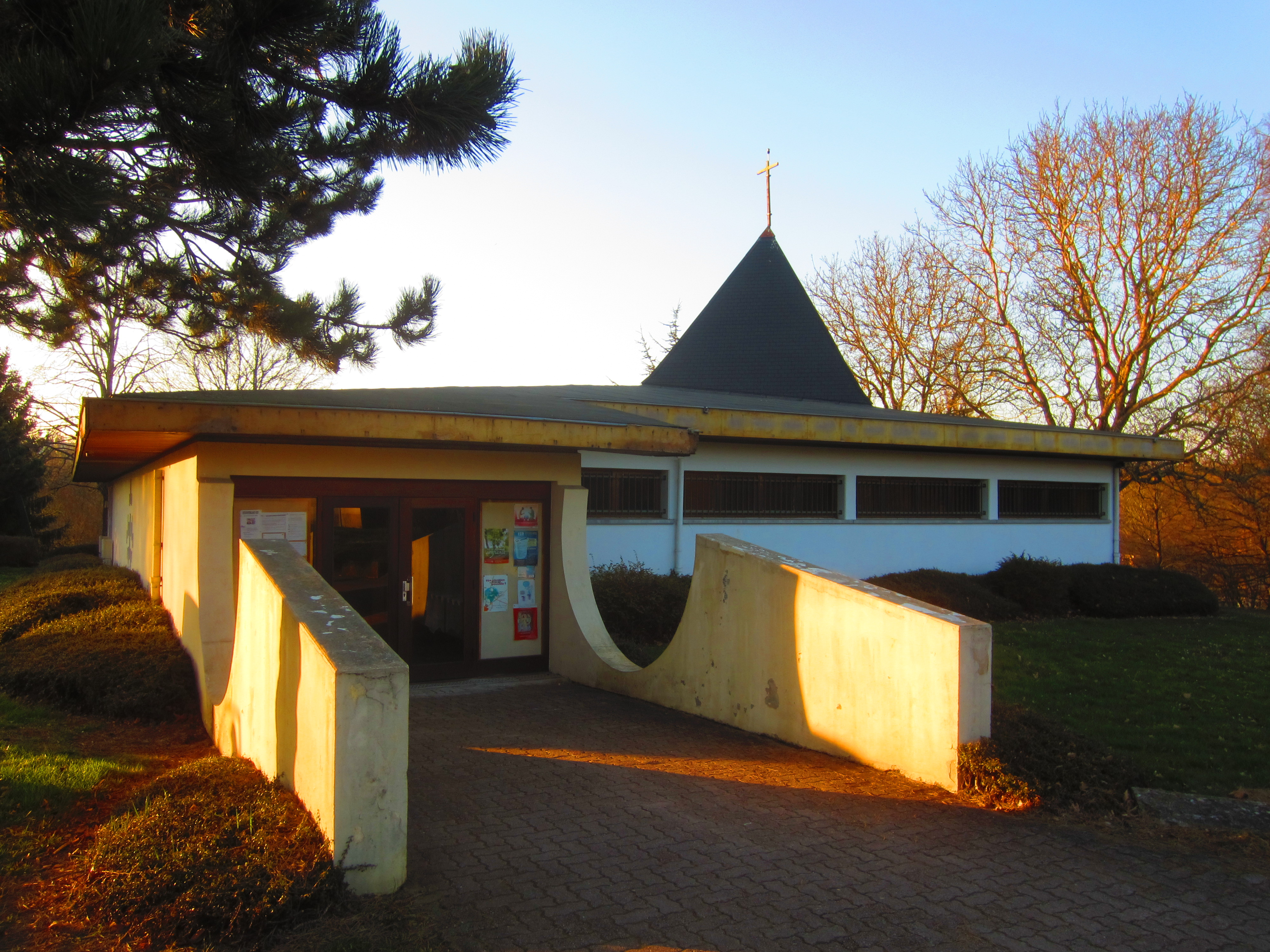
Church of Saint-Bernard (Clairlieu).

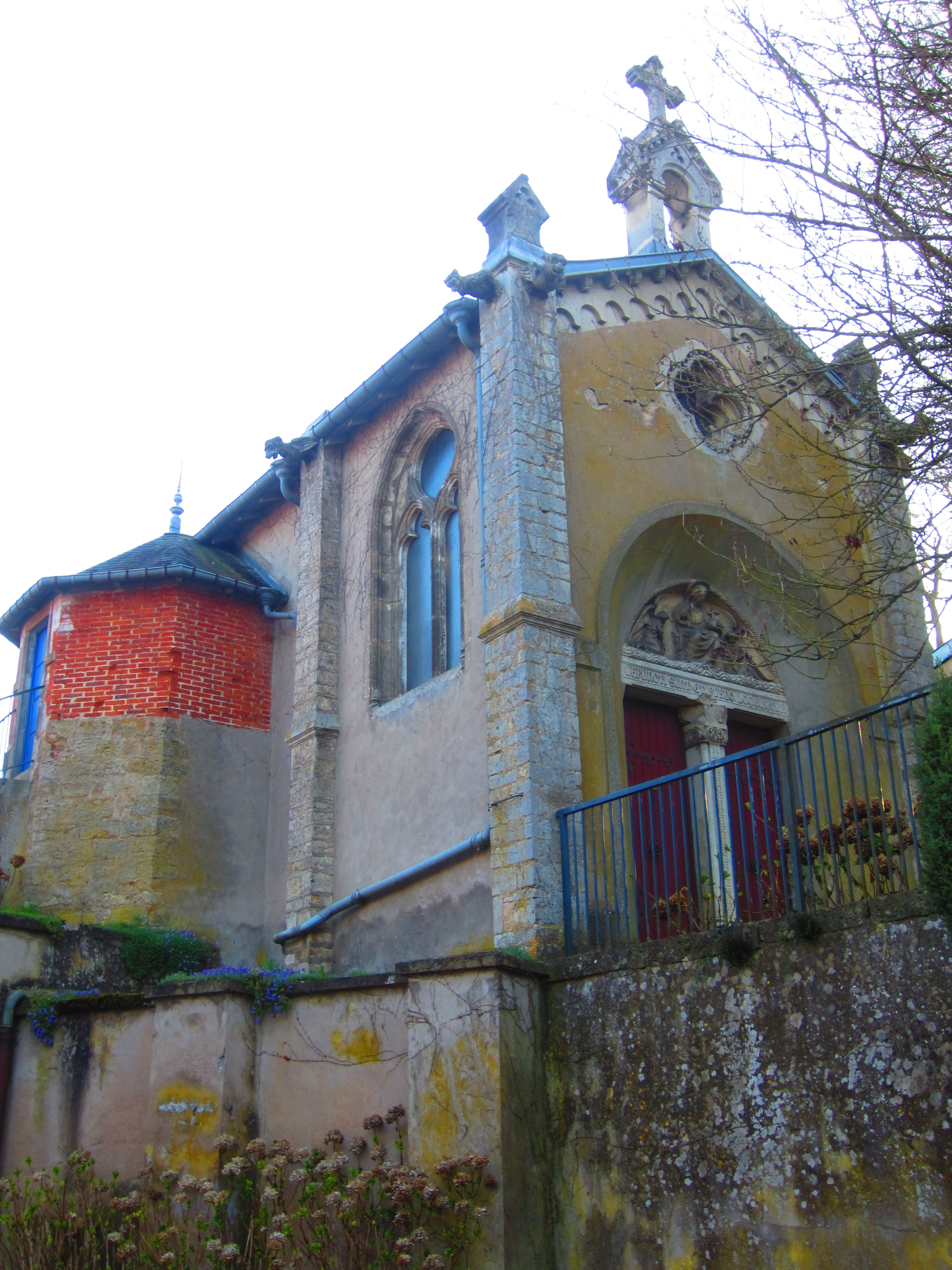
Orthodox chapel of the Gauls.

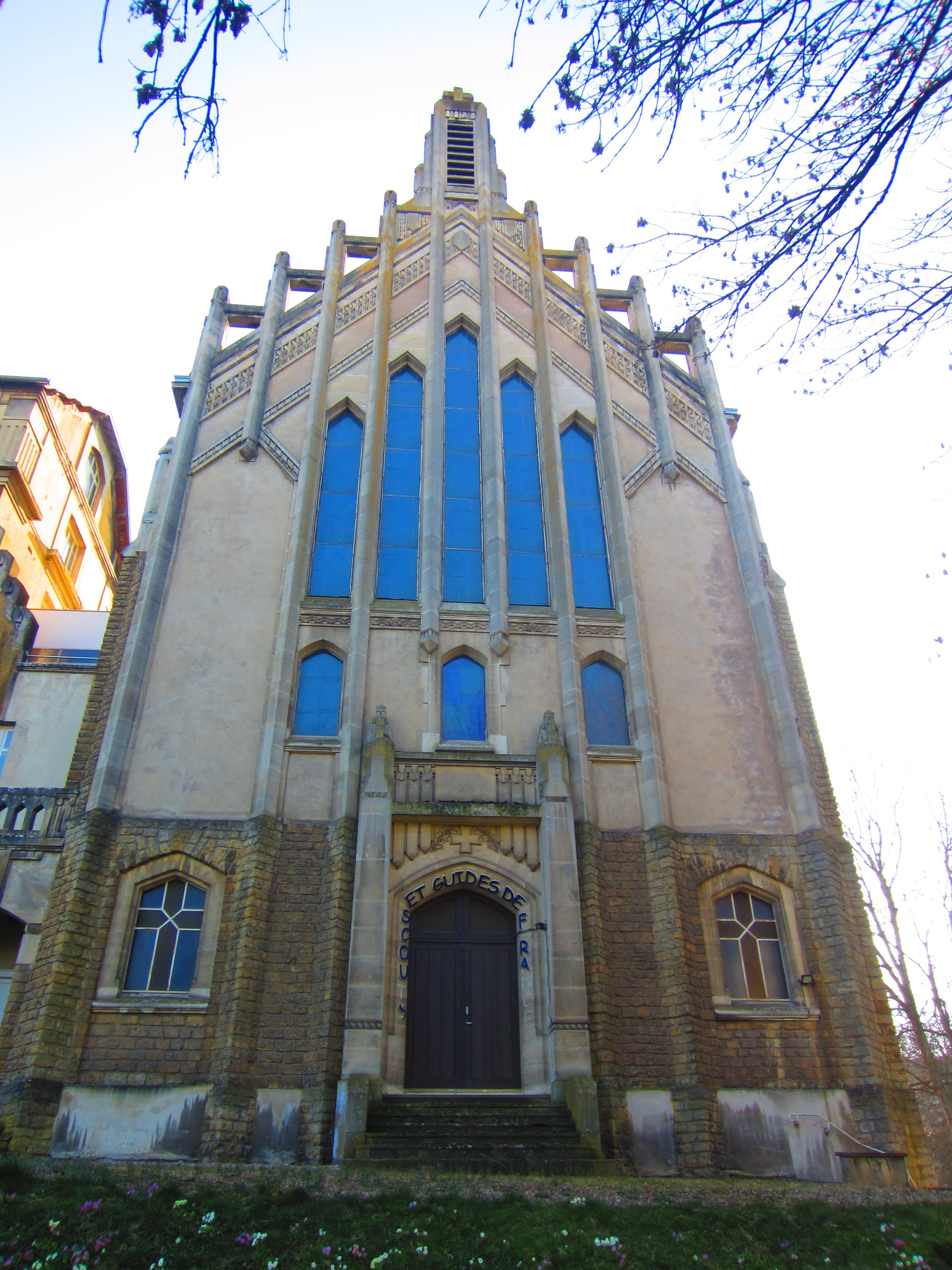
Major Seminar of l’Asnée.

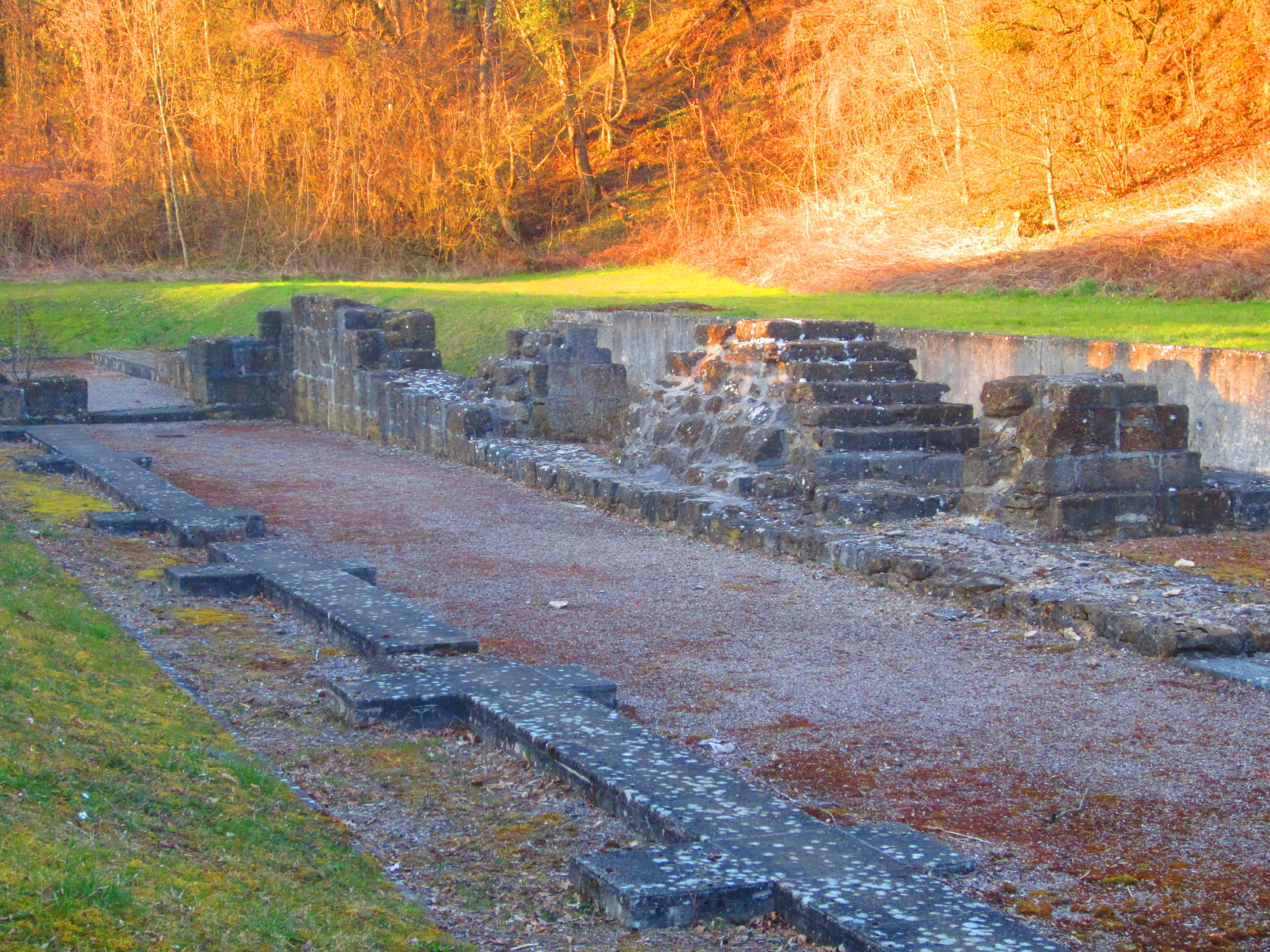
Ancient Cistercian abbey of the place-dit Clairlieu.

== Mayors ==
- François Villard, 1791
- Jean Claude Charbonnier, 1791
- François Villard, 1792
- Dieudonné Pierson, 1794
- François Villard, 1794
- Dieudonné Pierson, 1799
- François Houard, 1816
- Lefebvre, 1821
- Jean Claude Clement, 1831
- François Pierson, 1848
- Amédée Lefebre de Monjoie, 1871
- Hubert Simon, 1875
- Louis Valet, 1888
- Anatole de Scitivaux de Greische, 1900
- Louis Porry, 1912
- Louis Pierson de Brabois, 1915
- Charles Oudille, 1919
- Hyppolyte Briot, 1927
- Albert Cattenoz, 1935
- Martial Mourot, 1942
- Maurice Andre, 1944
- Raymond Villaume, 1945
- James Moisson, 1947
- Paul Muller, 1965
- Jean Bernardaux, 1980
- Pascal Jacquemin, 2001

== Twin towns ==
- Oerlinghausen, Germany, 1988

== Events ==
- Fête des Vendanges, a wine harvest celebration that occurs at the end of August/beginning of September
- Faites du solaire, another feast that occurs each year in October

== See also ==
- Communes of the Meurthe-et-Moselle department
