= Jarménil =

- Commune
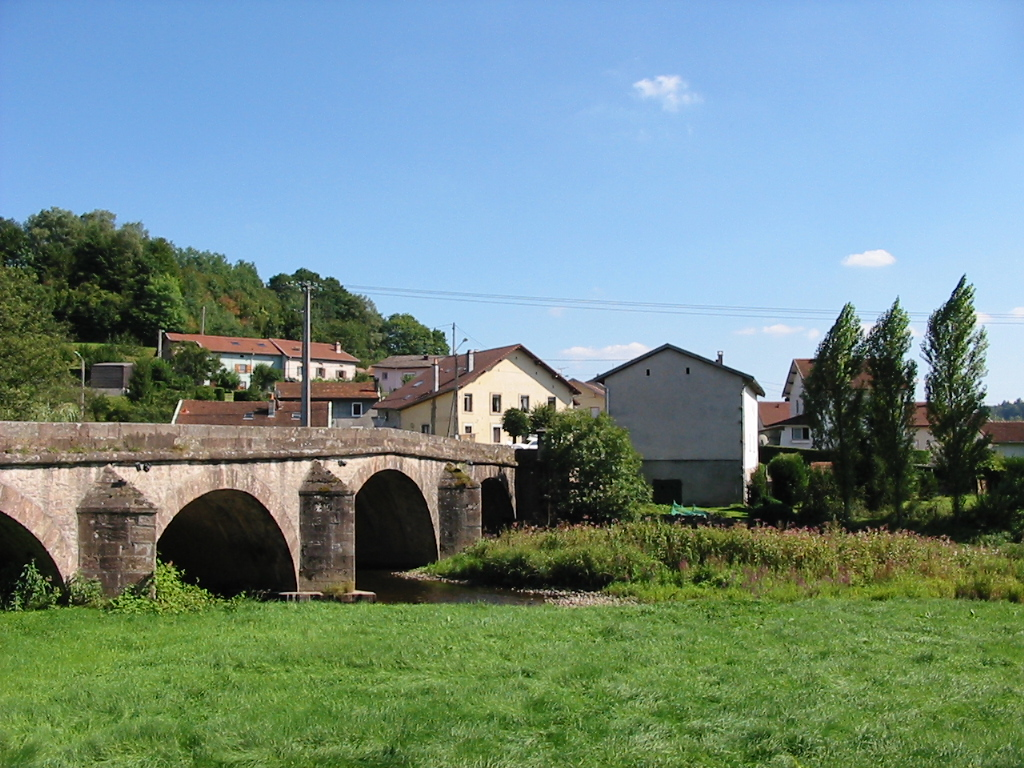
- Bridge on the Vologne
- Location of Jarménil
- Location within France Location within Grand Est
- Coordinates: 48°06′51″N 6°34′21″E
- Country: France
- Region: Grand Est
- Department: Vosges
- Arrondissement: Épinal
- Canton: Remiremont
- Intercommunality: CA Épinal

Government
  - Mayor (2020–2026): Dominique Pagelot
- Area^{1}: 5.10 km^{2} (1.97 sq mi)
- Highest elevation: 647 m (2,123 ft)
- Lowest elevation: 352 m (1,155 ft)
- Population (2023): 415
  - Density: 81.4/km^{2} (211/sq mi)
- Time zone: UTC+01:00 (CET)
  - Summer (DST): UTC+02:00 (CEST)
- INSEE/Postal code: 88250 /88550
- ^{1} French Land Register data, which excludes lakes, ponds, glaciers > 1 km^{2} (0.386 sq mi or 247 acres) and river estuaries.

Jarménil (French pronunciation: [ʒaʁmenil]) is a commune in the Vosges department in Grand Est in northeastern France.

== See also ==
- Communes of the Vosges department
