= Canton of Laxou =

Administrative division of France

Coordinates: 48.68°N 6.15°E

The canton of Laxou is an administrative division of the Meurthe-et-Moselle department, northeastern France. Its borders were not modified at the French canton reorganisation which came into effect in March 2015. Its seat is in Laxou.

It consists of the following communes:

1. Laxou
2. Villers-lès-Nancy
