= Jardin Dominique Alexandre Godron =

Botanical garden in France

Coordinates: 48.6948°N 6.1890°E

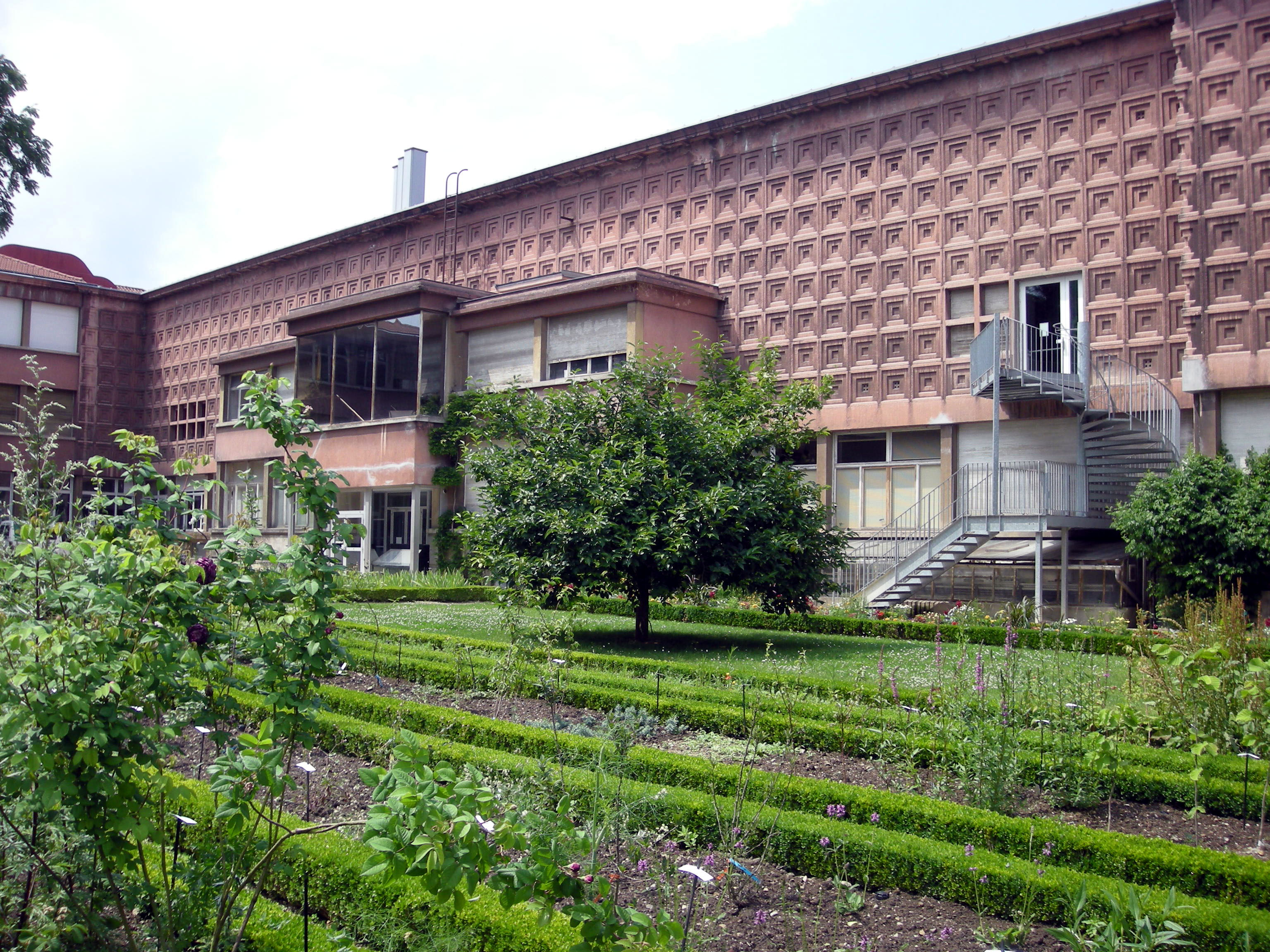
Jardin Dominique Alexandre Godron, with aquarium

The Jardin Dominique Alexandre Godron (French pronunciation: [ʒaʁdɛ̃ dɔminik alɛksɑ̃dʁ ɡɔdʁɔ̃]) is a historic botanical garden located at 3 rue Sainte-Catherine, Nancy, Meurthe-et-Moselle, Lorraine, France. It is open daily without charge.

The garden was founded in 1758 by Stanisław Leszczyński, the last Duke of Lorraine, as an adjunct to the Royal College of Medicine. It occupies 27 hectares (67 acres). It is the city's oldest botanical garden, and remained active as such until 1993 when its collections were transferred to the larger Jardin botanique du Montet outside the central city. It was named in honor of celebrated local botanist Dominique Alexandre Godron (1807–1880), who redesigned and reinvigorated the garden during his tenure as director, and now displays horticultural collections in its long, narrow beds.

== See also ==
- List of botanical gardens in France
