= Jardin botanique du Montet =

Botanical garden in Nancy, France

Coordinates: 48°39′34″N 6°9′13″E

The Jardin botanique Jean-Marie-Pelt (French pronunciation: [ʒaʁdɛ̃ bɔtanik ʒɑ̃ maʁi pɛlt]; 27 hectares), formerly Jardin botanique du Montet ([ʒaʁdɛ̃ bɔtanik dy mɔ̃tɛ]), is a major botanical garden operated by the Conservatoire et Jardins Botaniques de Nancy. It is located at 100, rue du Jardin Botanique, Villers-lès-Nancy, Meurthe-et-Moselle, Lorraine, France, and open daily; free entrance but an admission fee is charged to visit the greenhouses.

The garden was inaugurated in 1975 as successor to the city's earliest botanical garden, the Jardin Dominique Alexandre Godron (founded 1758), whose plants were transferred to the new garden in 1993. Today the garden contains more than 12,000 types of plants, organized into 15 collections by themes, including sections devoted to the plants of Lorraine, an arboretum, alpine garden, medicinal plants, rhododendrons, rose garden, and so forth, over 35 hectares (i.e. circa 86 acres). Its greenhouses (2500 m^{2}) contain humid and arid rooms sheltering a variety of plants including rare species such as Miconia ascendens and Rubus alceaefolius.

== Gallery ==
Click on images to enlarge

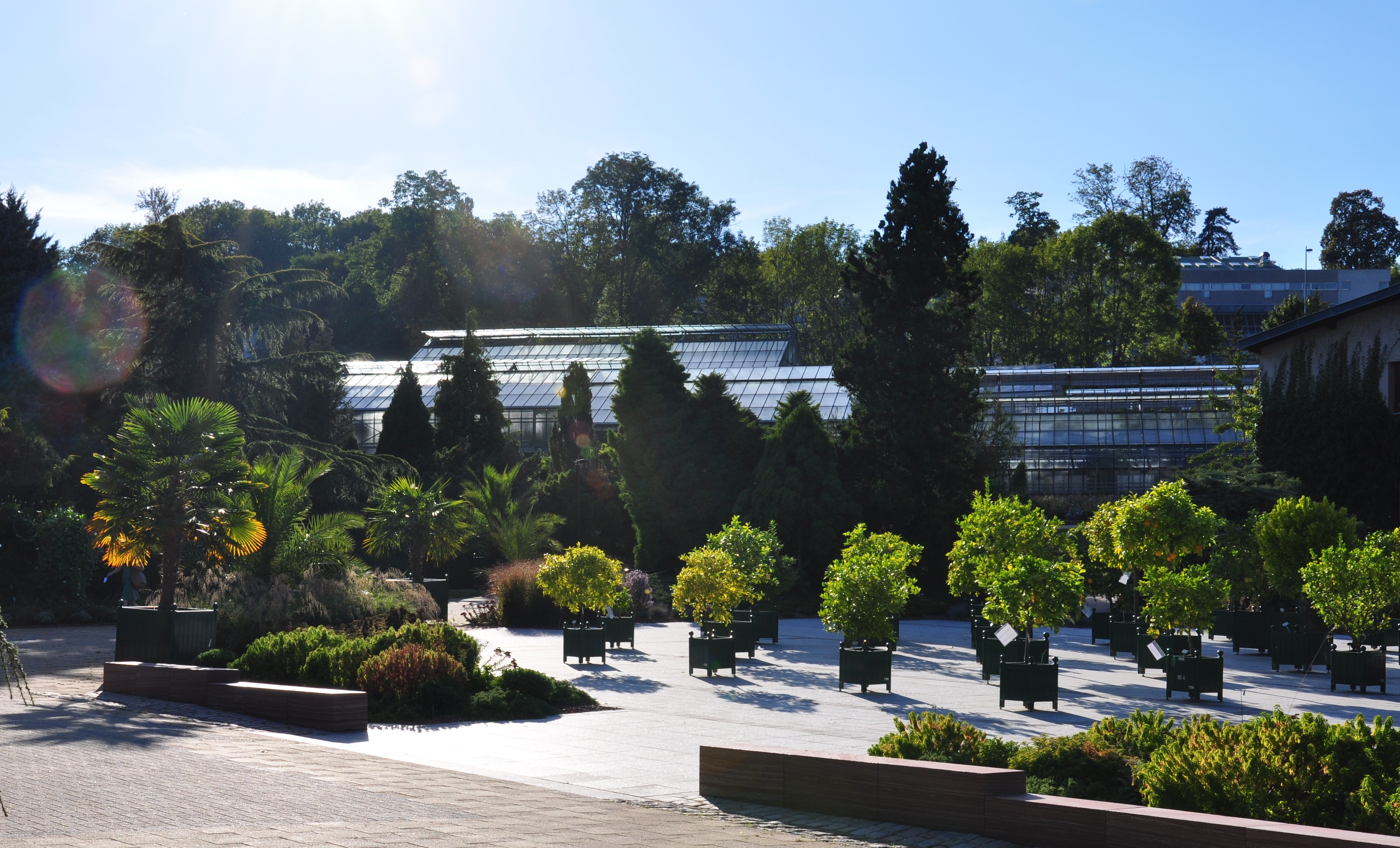
Botanical garden of Montet greenhouses

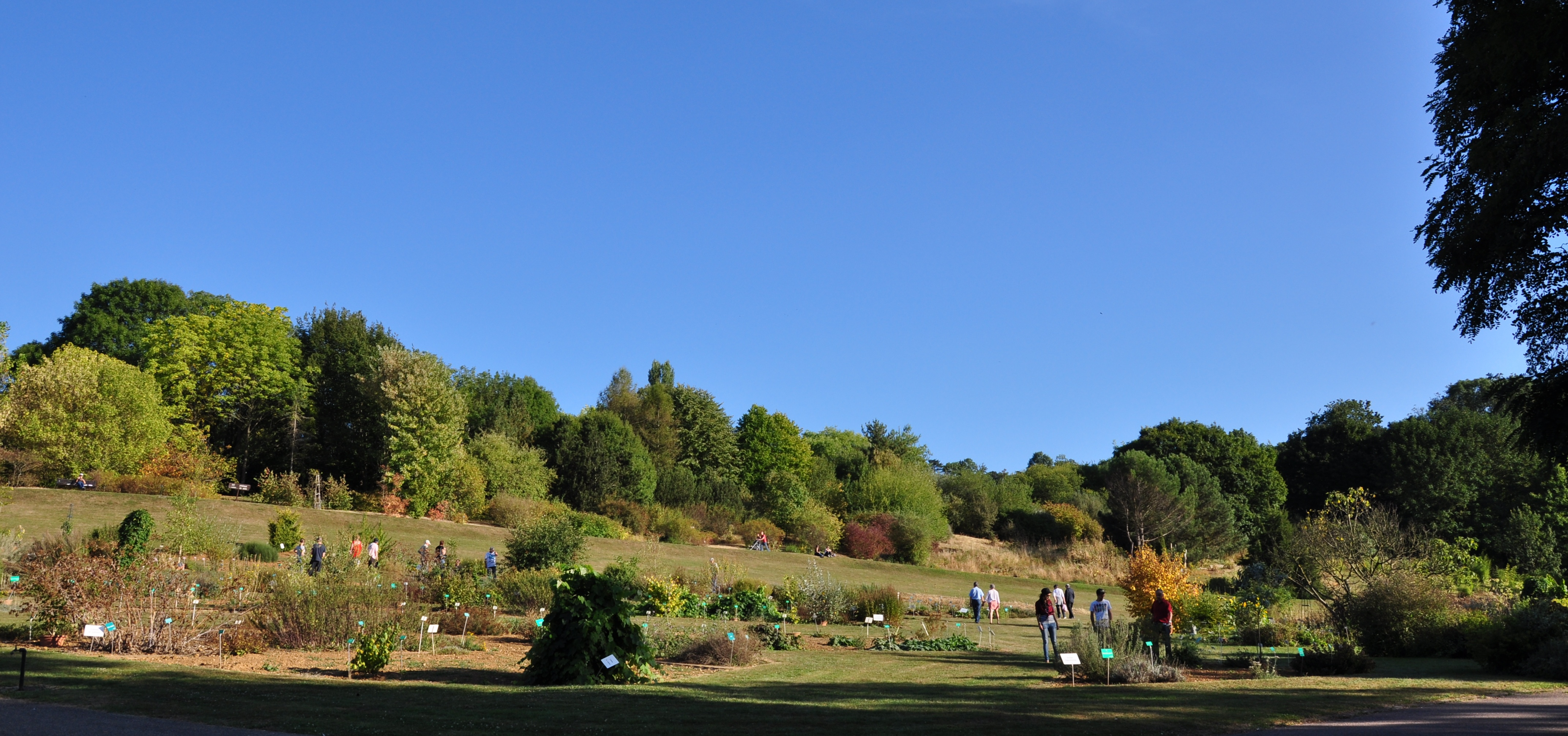
Panoramic view of the garden

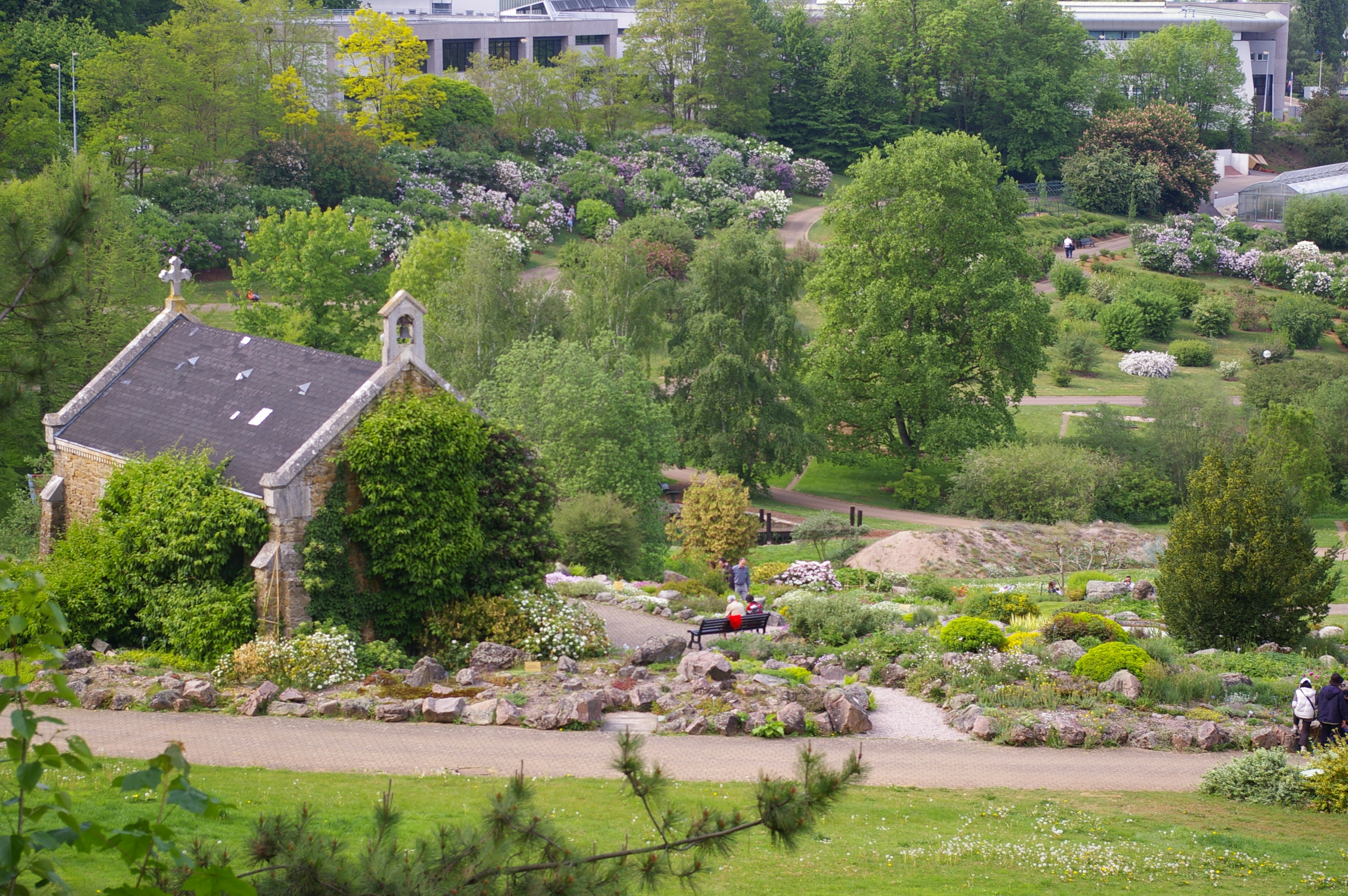
Botanical garden of Montet

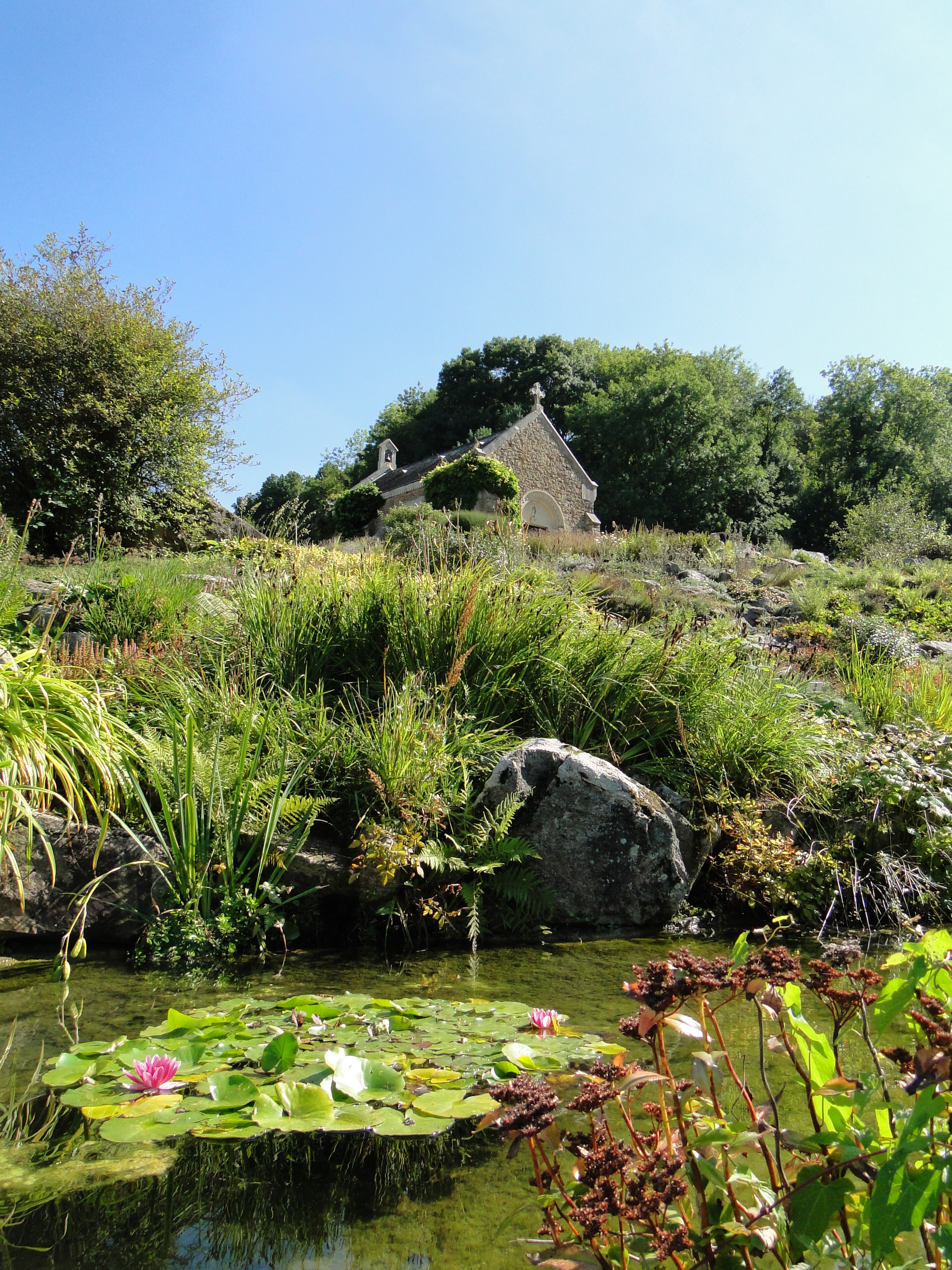
Sainte-Valérie Chapel and alpinum

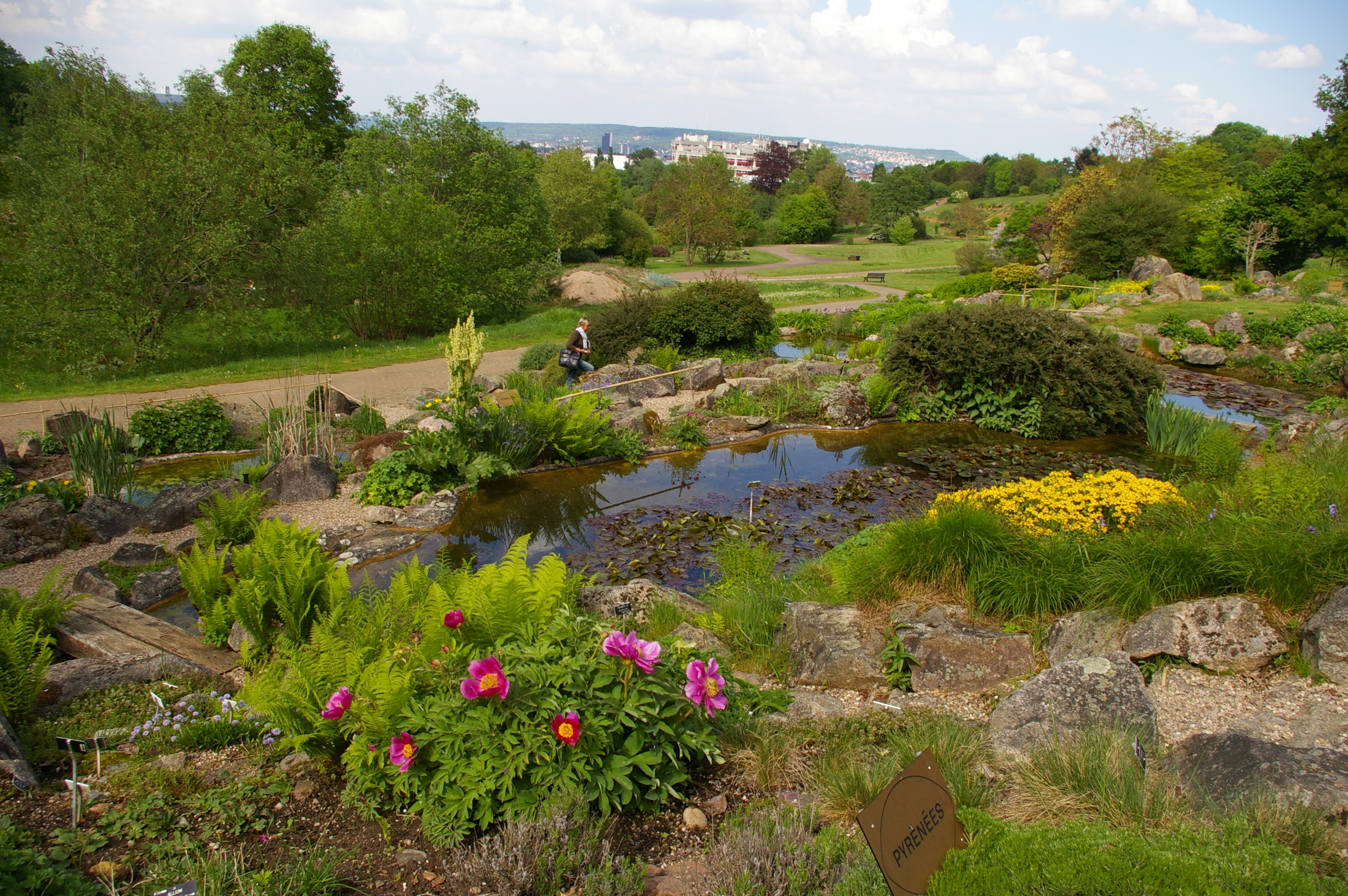
Botanical garden of Montet

== See also ==
- Jardin d'altitude du Haut Chitelet
- List of botanical gardens in France
