= Gérardmer =

- Commune
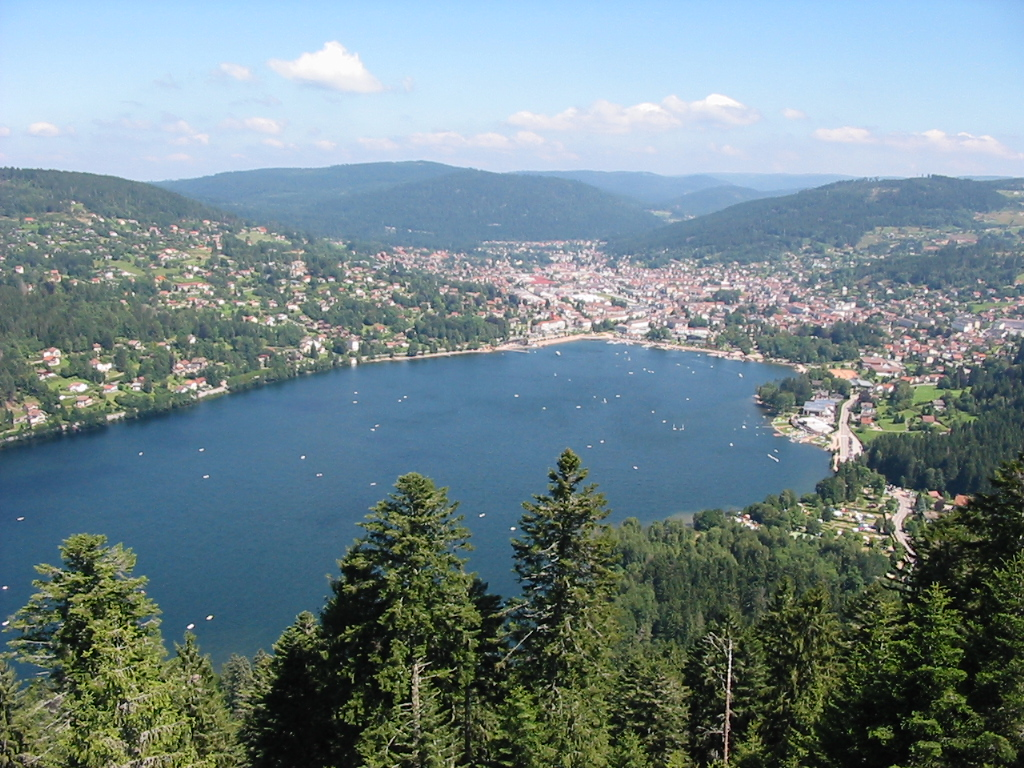
- Gérardmer and its lake

- Coat of arms
- Location of Gérardmer
- Location within France Location within Grand Est
- Coordinates: 48°05′N 6°53′E
- Country: France
- Region: Grand Est
- Department: Vosges
- Arrondissement: Saint-Dié-des-Vosges
- Canton: Gérardmer
- Intercommunality: CC Gérardmer Hautes Vosges

Government
  - Mayor (2020–2026): Stessy Speissmann
- Area^{1}: 54.78 km^{2} (21.15 sq mi)
- Elevation: 670 m (2,200 ft)
- Highest elevation: 1,125 m (3,691 ft)
- Lowest elevation: 584 m (1,916 ft)
- Population (2023): 7,581
  - Density: 138.4/km^{2} (358.4/sq mi)
- Time zone: UTC+01:00 (CET)
  - Summer (DST): UTC+02:00 (CEST)
- INSEE/Postal code: 88196 /88400
- Website: mairie-gerardmer.fr
- ^{1} French Land Register data, which excludes lakes, ponds, glaciers > 1 km^{2} (0.386 sq mi or 247 acres) and river estuaries.

Gérardmer (French pronunciation: [ʒeʁaʁme]; German: Gerdsee or archaic Geroldsee, and Giraumoué in local Vosgian) is a commune in the Vosges Department, Grand Est (before 2016: Lorraine), France. It is nicknamed "La perle des Vosges" (the gem of the Vosges).

Gérardmer is said to owe its name to Gerard, Duke of Lorraine, who in the 11th century built a tower on the bank of the lake or mer, near which, in 1285, a new town was founded.

== Geography ==
Gérardmer is situated at a height of 2,200 feet (670 m) at the eastern end of the small lake, the Lac de Gérardmer among forest-clad mountains. Historically it has been the chief summer resort of the French Vosges and was a centre for excursions, including to the summit of the Hohneck and the Schlucht, which is a mountain pass from France to Germany. Nearer the town is the picturesque defile of Granges, watered by the Vologne, which at one point forms the cascade known as the Saut des Cuves.

== Population ==
Historical population
Year	Pop.	±% p.a.
1968	9,326	—
1975	9,471	+0.22%
1982	9,106	−0.56%
1990	8,951	−0.21%
1999	8,845	−0.13%
2007	8,738	−0.15%
2012	8,423	−0.73%
2017	7,967	−1.11%
2023	7,581	−0.82%
Source: INSEE

== Culture ==
The Festival international du film fantastique de Gérardmer (literally Gérardmer International Festival of fantastic film, formerly named 'Fantastic'Arts' from 1994 to 2008) is an international festival of horror and fantastic films which has been held each year since 1994 in Gérardmer.

== Transport ==
The nearest airport is EuroAirport Basel Mulhouse Freiburg, which is located 109 km (68 mi) south east of Gérardmer.

== Notable people ==
- Maximilien Kelsch (1844–1906), industrialist and politician, born in Gérardmer
- Paul Cuny (1872–1925), industrialist and politician, born in Gérardmer
- Edward Gardère (1909–1997), fencer, born in Gérardmer
- André Gardère (1913–1977), fencer, born in Gérardmer
- Gilberte Cournand (1913–2005), journalist and dance critic, gallery owner and bookseller, born in Gérardmer
- Claude Vanony (1935), storyteller and humorist, born in Gérardmer
- Patrick Rémy (1965), cross-country skier, born in Gérardmer
- Raphaël Dargent (1970), historian, essayist and writer, born in Gérardmer
- Julien Bontemps (1979), sailor, learnt to sail in Gérardmer
- Maxime Laheurte (1985), world Nordic combined team champion (2012), born in Gérardmer
- Émile Duguet, Righteous Among the Nations, concealed Jews at his home in Gérardmer

== Twin towns ==
- Le Locle, Switzerland
- Tidermène, Mali
- Waremme, Belgium

== Climate ==
Climate data for Gérardmer, elevation 669 m (2,195 ft), (2003–2020 normals, extremes 2003–present)
Month	Jan	Feb	Mar	Apr	May	Jun	Jul	Aug	Sep	Oct	Nov	Dec	Year
Record high °C (°F)	16.1 (61.0)	21.0 (69.8)	23.8 (74.8)	27.0 (80.6)	32.0 (89.6)	36.1 (97.0)	36.5 (97.7)	37.0 (98.6)	31.5 (88.7)	26.5 (79.7)	24.0 (75.2)	16.0 (60.8)	37.0 (98.6)
Mean daily maximum °C (°F)	4.2 (39.6)	5.1 (41.2)	9.1 (48.4)	14.5 (58.1)	17.6 (63.7)	21.9 (71.4)	23.8 (74.8)	23.1 (73.6)	19.5 (67.1)	14.5 (58.1)	9.0 (48.2)	4.9 (40.8)	13.9 (57.0)
Daily mean °C (°F)	0.9 (33.6)	1.0 (33.8)	4.1 (39.4)	8.7 (47.7)	12.0 (53.6)	16.1 (61.0)	17.9 (64.2)	17.4 (63.3)	13.9 (57.0)	10.0 (50.0)	5.3 (41.5)	1.8 (35.2)	9.1 (48.4)
Mean daily minimum °C (°F)	−2.3 (27.9)	−3.1 (26.4)	−1.0 (30.2)	2.9 (37.2)	6.5 (43.7)	10.3 (50.5)	12.0 (53.6)	11.7 (53.1)	8.3 (46.9)	5.4 (41.7)	1.5 (34.7)	−1.3 (29.7)	4.2 (39.6)
Record low °C (°F)	−15.0 (5.0)	−19.0 (−2.2)	−19.5 (−3.1)	−8.0 (17.6)	−2.0 (28.4)	1.0 (33.8)	4.0 (39.2)	4.0 (39.2)	0.5 (32.9)	−7.0 (19.4)	−10.0 (14.0)	−20.5 (−4.9)	−20.5 (−4.9)
Average precipitation mm (inches)	207.0 (8.15)	151.2 (5.95)	143.9 (5.67)	112.8 (4.44)	149.4 (5.88)	128.8 (5.07)	123.4 (4.86)	144.2 (5.68)	112.9 (4.44)	157.8 (6.21)	151.9 (5.98)	214.0 (8.43)	1,797.3 (70.76)
Average precipitation days (≥ 1.0 mm)	16.9	13.6	14.4	11.6	15.1	12.5	11.9	12.6	10.1	13.3	14.6	16.7	163.2
Source: Meteociel

== See also ==
- Communes of the Vosges department
