= Vologne =

River in France

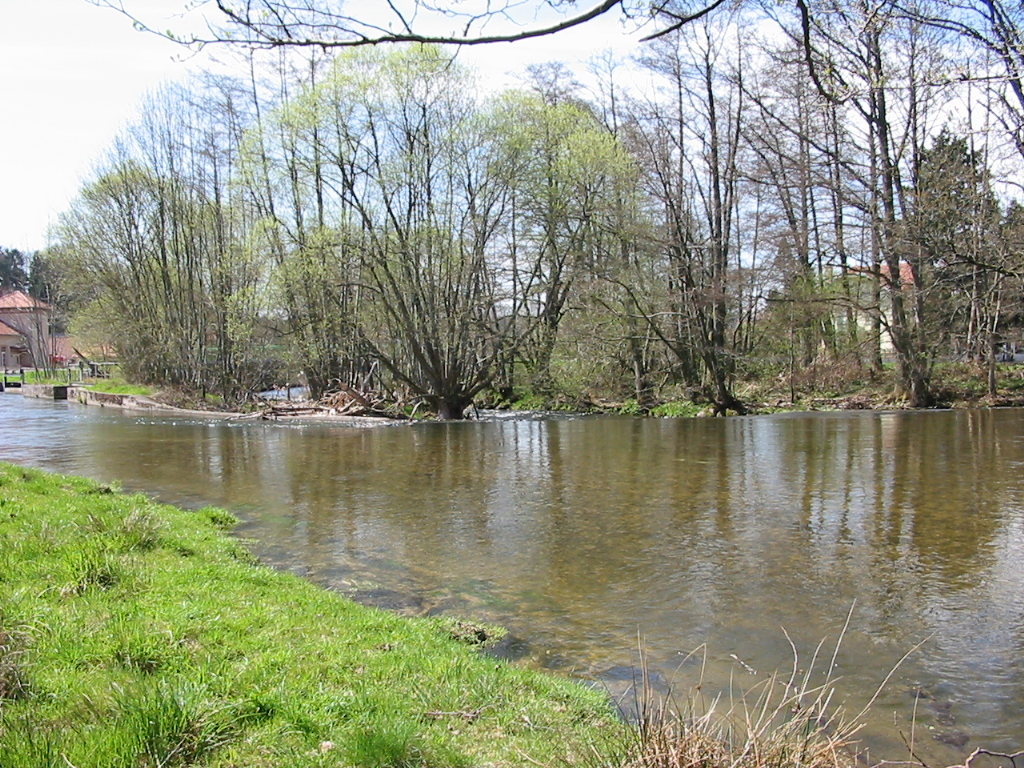
- The Vologne at Beauménil

- Location within France Location within Grand Est

Location
- Country: France

Physical characteristics
- Source
  - location: Vosges Mountains
- Mouth: Moselle
  - coordinates: 48°6′50″N 6°34′1″E
- Length: 50 km (31 mi)
- Basin size: 369 km^{2} (142 mi^{2})
- Discharge
  - average: 9.70 m^{3}/s (343 cu ft/s)

Basin features
- Progression: Moselle→ Rhine→ North Sea

The Vologne (French pronunciation: [vɔlɔɲ]) is a river of the Vosges department in France. It is a right tributary of the Moselle. Its source is in the Vosges Mountains, on the northwestern slope of the Hohneck. It flows through the lakes of Retournemer and Longemer, and passes the villages of Xonrupt-Longemer, Granges-sur-Vologne, Lépanges-sur-Vologne and Docelles, finally flowing into the Moselle in Pouxeux.

== Geography ==
The source of the Vologne is within the Jardin d'altitude du Haut Chitelet. It flows through the lake of Retournemer and Lac de Longemer before receiving the Jamagne, a spillway of Lac de Gérardmer. It flows by Granges-sur-Vologne, receives the Corbeline, the Neuné (south of Bruyères) and the Barba at Docelles, then flows into the Moselle at Jarménil, 10 km upstream of Épinal. It is 49.6 kilometres (30.8 mi) long and its drainage basin has an area of 369 square kilometres (142 mi^{2}).

=== Tributaries ===
- Faignes Fories
- Balveurche
- Belbriette
- Relles Gouttes
- Martimpré
- Jamagne
- Stream of Chaufour
- Corbeline
- Bas Prés
- Clous
- Neuné
- Lizerne
- Cul d'Honstot
- Malenrupt
- Barba

== Hydrology ==
The Vologne is a substantial river, as a result of its neighbours in the region of the Vosges Mountains. Its flow rate has been observed for a period of 40 years at Cheniménil, a locality in the Vosges department situated slightly before its confluence with the Moselle. The river's watershed at that point is 355 square kilometres (137 mi^{2}), almost the entire watershed, which is 369 square kilometres (142 mi^{2}).

The interannual mean flow rate, or discharge of the Vologne at Cheniménil is 9.70 cubic metres per second (343 cu ft/s).

The Vologne exhibits quite marked seasonal variations in flow rate, as is often seen in Eastern France, with winter–spring high water bringing the monthly flow rate to a level between 10.9 and 14.6 cubic metres per second (380 and 520 cu ft/s) from November to April inclusive with a maximum in February. The low water for July to September brings the average monthly flow rate down to 3.89 cubic metres per second (137 cu ft/s) in August. Nonetheless, these are only averages and there are significant fluctuations over short times.

Mean monthly flow rate (in m^{3}/s) measured at the Cheniménil hydrological station – data calculated over 40 years

At low water, the 3-year low instantaneous flow rate can drop to 0.99 cubic metres per second (35 cu ft/s) in the case of a dry five-year period, which is low but normal for Eastern French regions.

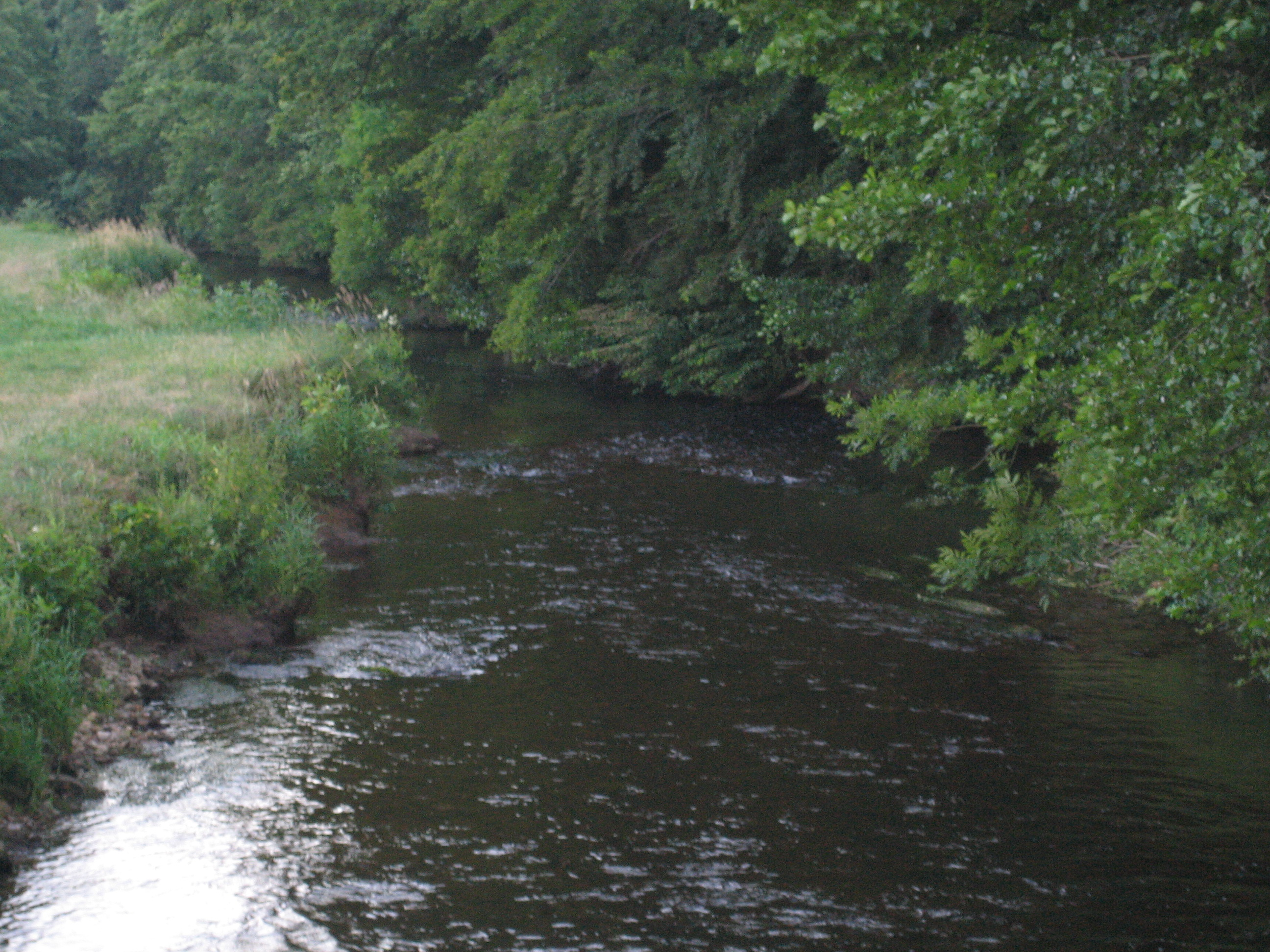
The Vologne near Deycimont, slightly above the confluence with the Barba

Flooding of the Vologne can also be significant. Thus the maximum instantaneous flow rate recorded was 143 cubic metres per second (5,000 cu ft/s) on 9 April 1983, while the maximum daily average flow rate was 108 cubic metres per second (3,800 cu ft/s) the following day. The instantaneous maximal flowrate 2 (IMFR2) and IMFR5 metrics were 61 and 85 cubic metres per second (2,200 and 3,000 cu ft/s) respectively. The IMFR10, or flow rate calculated from the 10-year flood, is 100 cubic metres per second (3,500 cu ft/s), the IMFR20 is 120 cubic metres per second (4,200 cu ft/s) and the IMFR50 was 140 cubic metres per second (4,900 cu ft/s). These values are of the order of a fifth of those of the Meurthe, and thus comparable when one takes into account the respective extents of their watersheds. It also appears from this that the floods of April 19 discussed above were of the order of 50-year floods, i.e. which might be expected to occur twice per century.

The Vologne is a very substantial river despite the relative smallness of its basin. The rainfall of the Vosges region which feeds it is also very significant. The runoff curve number in its watershed is 868 millimetres (34.2 in) annually, which is very high, almost three times the ensemble average over France, and almost twice the French basin of the Moselle, 445 millimetres (17.5 in) at Hauconcourt. The specific flow rate reaches 27.4 litres per second per square kilometre of basin.

=== Water quality ===
In 2006, the Rhine-Meuse water agency assigned the Vologne's water analysed at the level of Jarménil, a quality rating of 1B, or "bonne" (good) during each of the years in the 10-year period 1997–2006, except in 2002, when the river achieved level 1A, or "très bonne" (very good). In 2006 a slightly excessive level of ammonium (NH_{4}+) ions were observed, but with an oxygen saturation of 79 percent (or 7.9 mg/L) the oxygenation was sufficient.

== History and economy ==
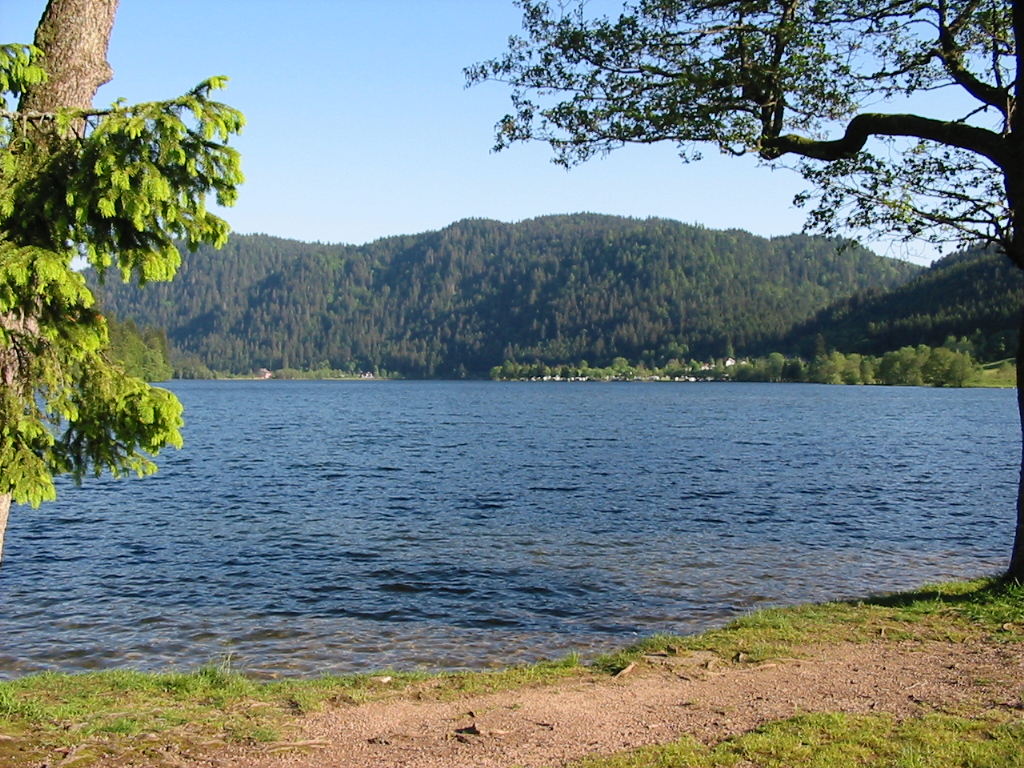
The Lac de Longemer is traversed by the Vologne.

Until the beginning of the 20th century, the famous "pearls of the Vologne" were harvested. Their harvest is attested from the 16th century. The pearls, rather small, were prized by the bourgeoisie and the nobility up until the 19th century, at which time their rarity caused interest to wane. Pearl fishing was regulated and overseen by "gardes-perles" watchers. The name of lordly residence which dominates Cheniménil, the Château sur Perle, refers to the old pearl industry.

The molluscs which produce these pearls are called freshwater pearl mussels (scientific name Margaritifera margaritifera). They measure about 11 by 5 centimetres (4.3 by 2.0 in) and have a life expectancy of about 80 years. This substantial lifetime gives rise to a very slow regeneration rate for the population, which in turn explains the quasi-disappearance of the species owing to fishing, certainly, but also to the pollution of the river by textile factories.

The textile industry itself has now almost disappeared, and while this is a cultural, economic and social setback, it has afforded the Vologne a steady improvement in water quality over recent years. Its high trout population density won it the right to hold certain rounds of the World Fly Fishing Championships in July 2002.

The upper Vologne valley is a popular destination for tourism in the Vosges department. Places to visit there, aside from the lakes, include the Saut des Cuves cascade on an ancient glacial lock, and the Pont des Fées (Fairies' Bridge) built in 1763.

The Vologne is classed as a cours d'eau de première catégorie (category 1 watercourse) over the whole of its length.

=== Grégory Villemin ===
On 16 October 1984, the body of a four-year-old, Grégory Villemin, was found in the Vologne near Docelles. The case was highly publicised in France and became known as the Affaire Grégory. As of 2025 the case remains unsolved.

=== Environmental protection ===
The site known as de la Vallée de la Vologne has been protected since 8 December 1910. Only the part within the commune of Granges, about 4.5 kilometres (2.8 mi), benefits from protection. This valley is flanked by two steep slopes rising from 250 to 300 metres (820 to 980 ft) that are covered from the base to the summit with ancient trees, enormous rocks or scree. The Vologne flows at the foot of the valley, past naturally growing trees and dark rocks which line its route. The river, the railway line and the road occupy the bottom of the valley, whose width, at certain places, is no more than 20 to 25 metres (66 to 82 ft); the slopes are so close to each other that the sun can barely penetrate.

== See also ==
- List of rivers in France
