= Haut de Falimont =

Peak in the Vosges Mountains

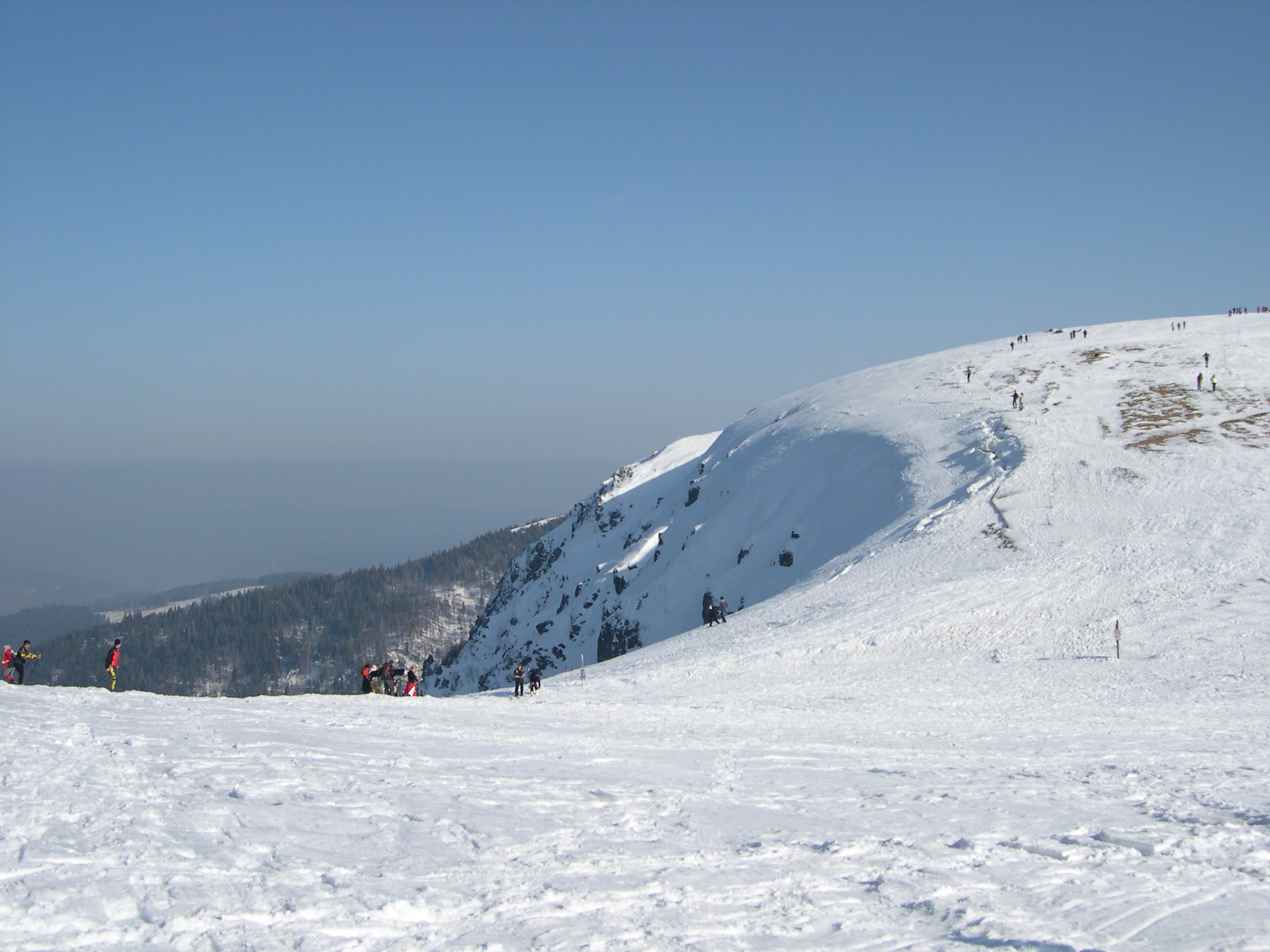
- Partial view from the Hohneck.

Highest point
- Elevation: 1,306 m (4,285 ft)
- Coordinates: 48°02′34″N 7°00′35″E

Geography
- Location within France
- Location: Alsace, Lorraine, France
- Parent range: Vosges Mountains

The Haut de Falimont is a summit of the Vosges massif, reaching an altitude of 1,306 meters. It is a secondary peak of the Hohneck.

== Geography ==
The Haut de Falimont is a secondary peak of the Hohneck, reaching an altitude of 1,306 meters. It is situated on a ridge that marks the boundary between the Vosges department and the Haut-Rhin department, and defines the limits of the municipalities of La Bresse, Xonrupt-Longemer, and Stosswihr.

Among the 90 plant species listed in the Falimont area, 4 are subject to strict protection, while 10 others are listed in the Alsace Red List due to their vulnerability.

== Activities ==
It is crossed by various hiking trails and by the GRP Tour de la Vologne. Mountaineering is also practiced there.

== See also ==
- Vosges Mountains
