= Jardin d'altitude du Haut Chitelet =

Botanical garden in Vosges, Lorraine, France

Coordinates: 48°3′5″N 7°0′42″E

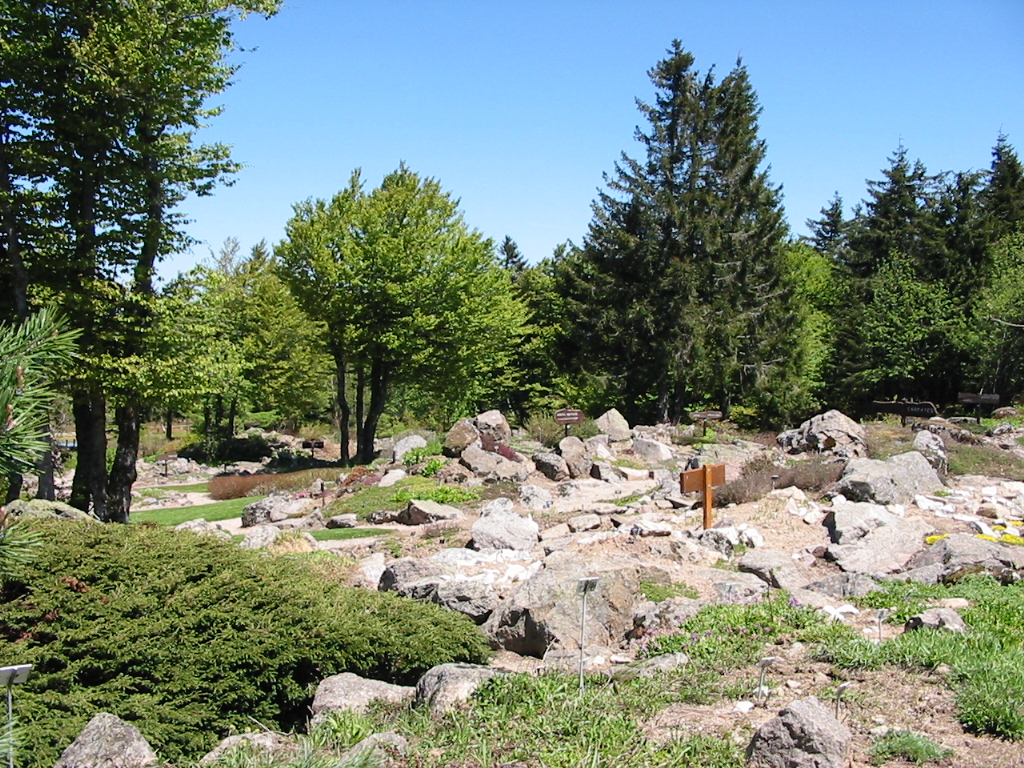
- Jardin d'altitude du Haut Chitelet
- Interactive map of Jardin d'altitude du Haut Chitelet
- Location: Xonrupt-Longemer, Vosges, France
- Area: 12 ha (30 acres)
- Opened: 1903
- Founder: Camille Brunotte
- Owner: Nancy-Université
- Open: 15 June - 30 September: 10 am–6 pm
- Status: open
- Parking: roadside parking
- Website: www.jardinbotaniquedenancy.eu/jardin-du-chitelet

The Jardin d'altitude du Haut Chitelet (French pronunciation: [ʒaʁdɛ̃ daltityd dy o ʃitlɛ]; 1.5 hectares) is a botanical garden specializing in high-elevation alpine plants, located at about 1220 metres elevation on the Route des Crêtes, near the peak of Hohneck (Vosges), about 1 km south of the Col de la Schlucht in Vosges, Lorraine, France. It is maintained by the Jardin botanique du Montet and the Conservatoire et Jardins Botaniques de Nancy, open daily in the warmer months; an admission fee is charged.

== Location and climate ==
The Jardin d'altitude du Haut Chitelet is located at an elevation of 1,228 m, on the northwest side of the Vosges massif on the Route des Crêtes, near the peak of Hohneck (Vosges) about 1 km south of the Col de la Schlucht, 88400 Xonrupt-Longemer in Vosges (department), Lorraine (region), France.

The garden contains the source of the river Vologne and is surrounded by the eponymous high-elevation meadows "Hautes Chaumes", which are typical for the tops of the highest peaks of the Vosges at an elevation above 1250 to 1300 meters.

The Vosges massif forms the first natural barrier for Atlantic winds and moisture, causing rainfall even in the middle of summer. The mountain climate at the garden is marked by the following annual climatic averages: 200 days of precipitation, 162 days of snow cover, 2,200 mm of rainfall and an average temperature of 3.5 degree Celsius. A comparable climate is found at an elevation of 1,800 m in the Northern Alps or 2,000 m in the Pyrenees. The high humidity allows numerous lichens and mosses to flourish.

== History ==
The garden was first established in 1903 as Montabey Botanical Garden by Professor Camille Brunotte of the Nancy-Université, It had grown from 120 species in 1904 to 800 species in 1914 but unfortunately was destroyed at the beginning of World War I.

In 1954 the Office national des forêts donated a second plot of 11 hectares to the University to restart the garden. The first work was carried out in 1965 by young French and German horticulturists, organised in work camps, covering nearly 2 hectares of rock.

Plantings began in 1966 with the new garden opening in 1970. It has been named a Jardin Remarquable by the ministry of culture. In 2012, a drying peat bog accentuated by historic drainage operations and military trenches with subsequent colonization by shrubs and trees like willows, birches and spruces was restored by closing drainage channels to retain water. A walkway was built allowing visitors to view the ecosystem.

== Collections ==
In terms of its alpine plant collections, the Jardin d'Altitude du Haut Chitelet is a useful complement to the University's Jardin botanique du Montet, which can only accommodate plants from medium high elevation mountains.

As of 2013, the garden contained more than 2300 plant varieties with a particular focus on the Vosges including forest plants (mountain beech forest featuring beech with tortuous trunks and its particular herbaceous vegetation such as Gymnocarpium dryopteris, Polygonum bistorta, Cicerbita alpina), mosses (including clubmosses, Lycopodium), peat bog flora, ferns, mountain shrubs and medicinal plants as well as plants from the mountains of France, namely the Alpes, the Jura and the Pyrénées.

As of 2017, the garden contained 2500 species. The garden also contains plants from mountainous regions of North America, Japan, China, the Himalayas, the Caucasus, Siberia, and New Zealand arranged in a geographical fashion.

== See also ==
- List of botanical gardens in France
