= Lac de Longemer =

Glacial lake in France

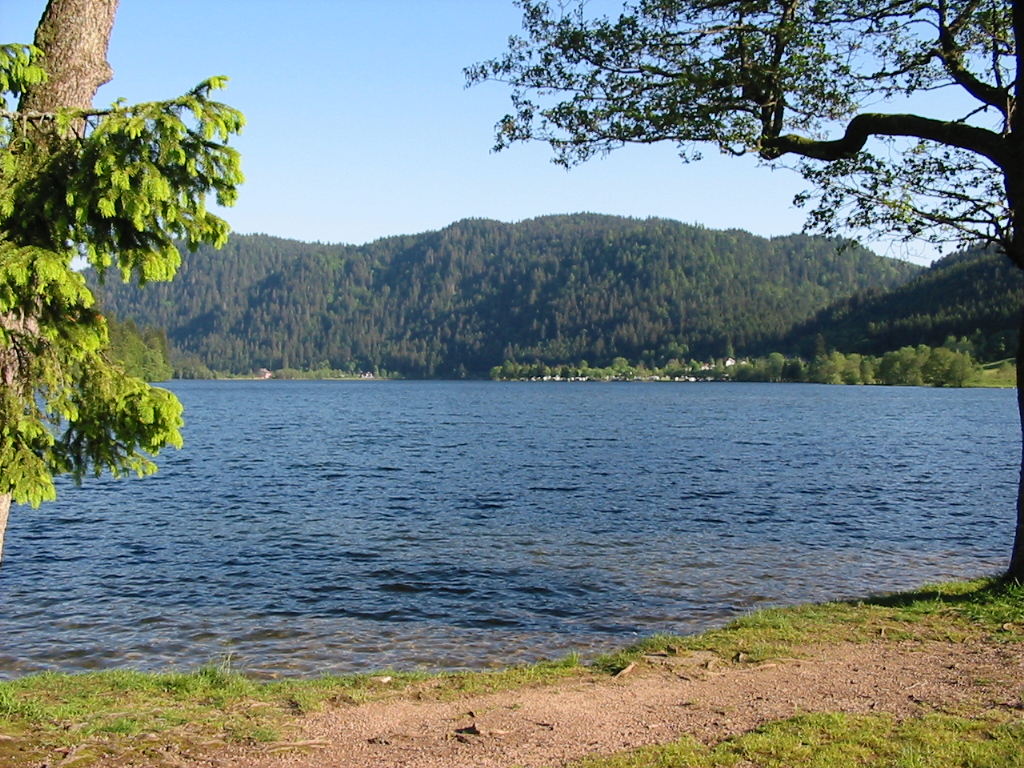

- Location within France
- Location: Vosges
- Coordinates: 48.070278°N 6.950556°E
- Type: glacial
- Primary outflows: Vologne
- Basin countries: France
- Max. length: 2,000 m (6,600 ft)
- Max. width: 500 m (1,600 ft)
- Surface area: 0.76 km^{2} (0.29 sq mi)
- Max. depth: 34 m (112 ft)
- Surface elevation: 736 m (2,415 ft)

Lac de Longemer is a lake near Xonrupt-Longemer, in Vosges, France. At an elevation of 736 m, its surface area is 0.76 km^{2} (0 sq mi).
