= Xonrupt-Longemer =

- Commune
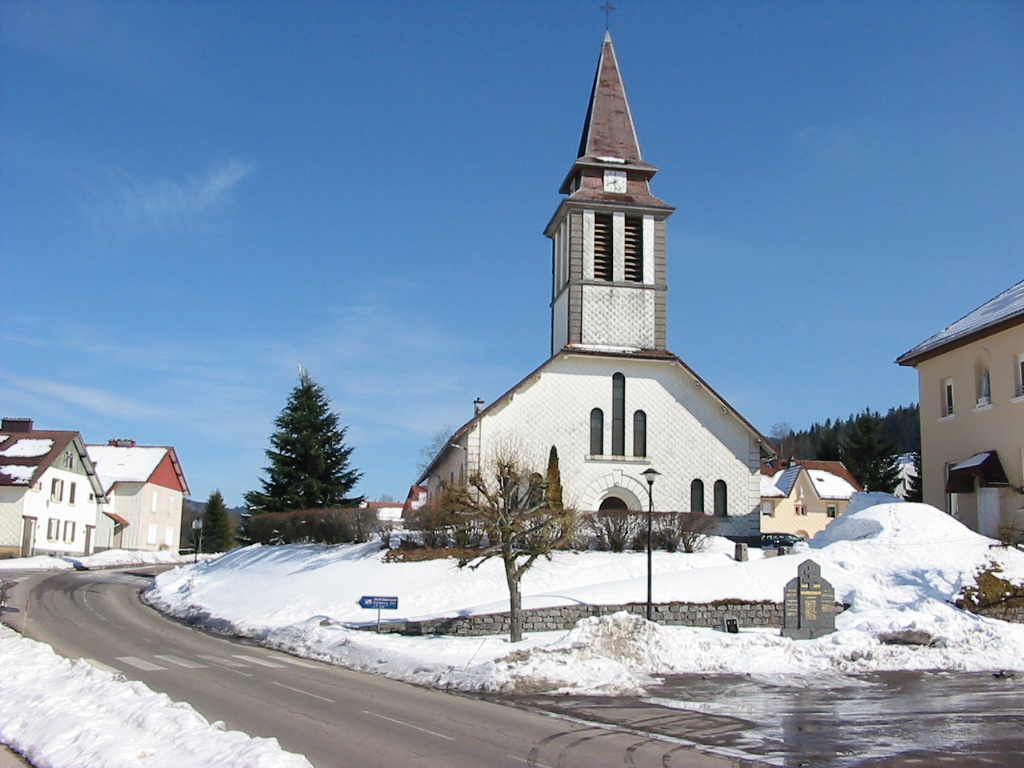
- The centre of Xonrupt at the end of winter

- Coat of arms
- Location of Xonrupt-Longemer
- Location within France Location within Grand Est
- Coordinates: 48°05′N 6°56′E
- Country: France
- Region: Grand Est
- Department: Vosges
- Arrondissement: Saint-Dié-des-Vosges
- Canton: Gérardmer
- Intercommunality: CC Gérardmer Hautes Vosges

Government
  - Mayor (2020–2026): Michel Bertrand
- Area^{1}: 30.71 km^{2} (11.86 sq mi)
- Highest elevation: 1,306 m (4,285 ft)
- Lowest elevation: 642 m (2,106 ft)
- Population (2023): 1,479
  - Density: 48.16/km^{2} (124.7/sq mi)
- Time zone: UTC+01:00 (CET)
  - Summer (DST): UTC+02:00 (CEST)
- INSEE/Postal code: 88531 /88400
- Website: www.xonrupt.fr
- ^{1} French Land Register data, which excludes lakes, ponds, glaciers > 1 km^{2} (0.386 sq mi or 247 acres) and river estuaries.

Xonrupt-Longemer (French pronunciation: [ksɔ̃ʁy lɔ̃ʒmɛʁ]) is a commune in the Vosges department in Grand Est in northeastern France.

== Geography ==
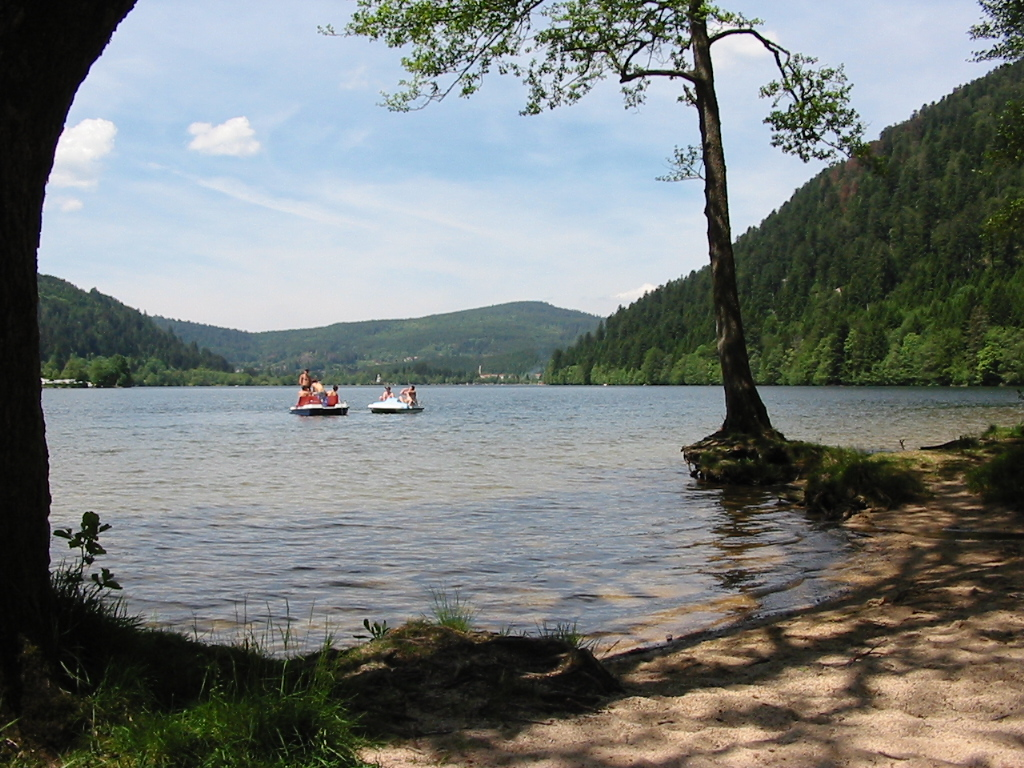
The Lac de Longemer and 2 pedalos seen from the shore

The commune is located in the upper valley of the Vologne river, that goes up to the Schlucht mountain pass. The lowest point of this valley is located 642 m (2,106 ft) above sea level. The Longemer lake is located at 736 m (2,415 ft) and the highest point is the Haut de Falimont at 1,306 m (4,285 ft), located near the Hohneck.

It is one of 188 communes in the Ballons des Vosges Nature Park.

== Points of interest ==
- Jardin d'altitude du Haut Chitelet.
- Pont des fées ("Fairies bridge"), built in the 18th century.
- Chapelle Saint-Florent, with a bell from 1650.

== Population ==
Its inhabitants are called Xonrupéens in French.

Historical population
Year	Pop.	±% p.a.
1968	1,027	—
1975	1,101	+1.00%
1982	1,333	+2.77%
1990	1,415	+0.75%
1999	1,489	+0.57%
2007	1,573	+0.69%
2012	1,568	−0.06%
2017	1,522	−0.59%
2023	1,479	−0.48%
Source: INSEE

== See also ==
- Communes of the Vosges department
