= Laxou =

- Commune
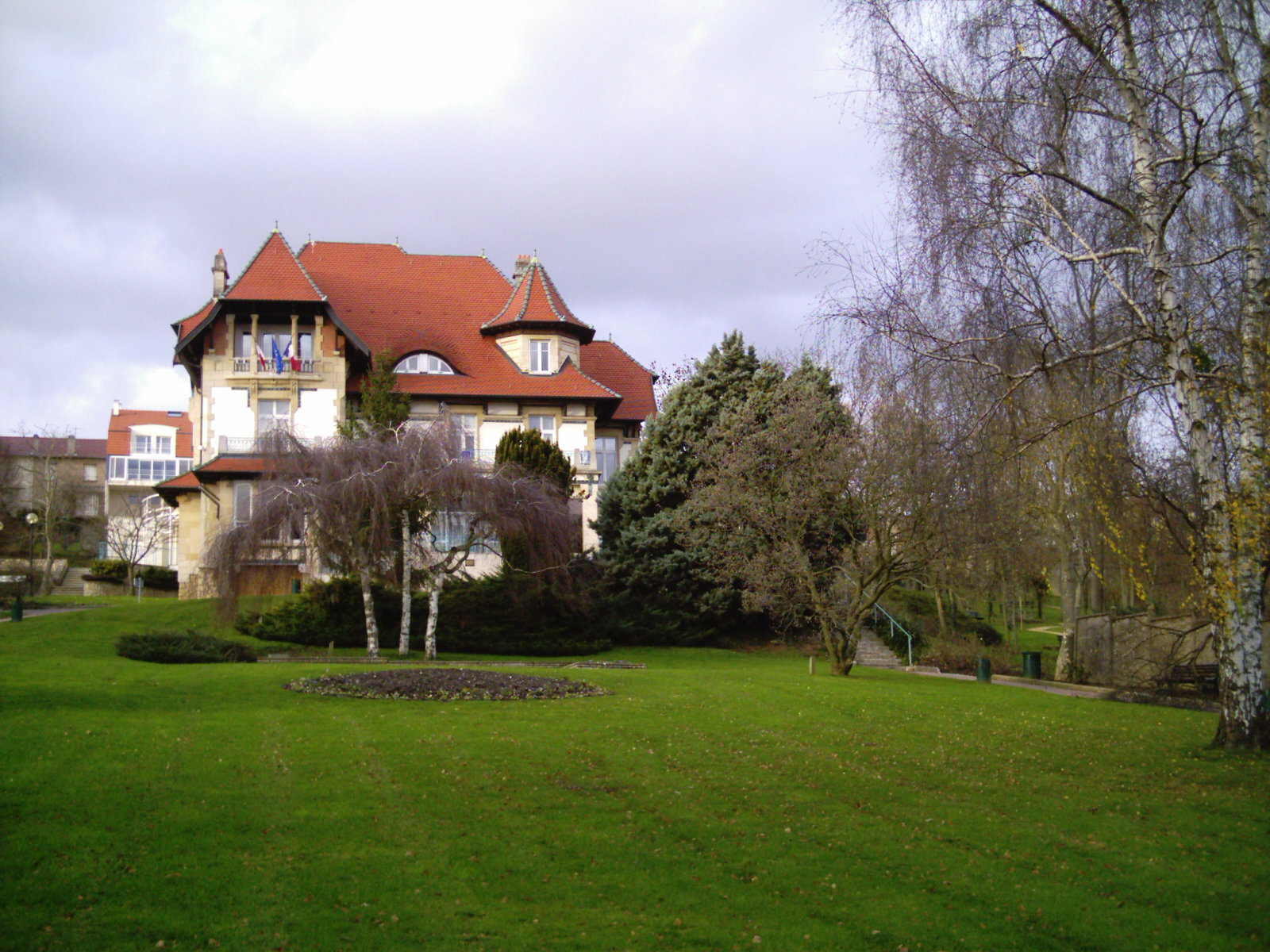
- Town hall

- Coat of arms
- Location of Laxou
- Location within France Location within Grand Est
- Coordinates: 48°41′11″N 6°09′10″E
- Country: France
- Region: Grand Est
- Department: Meurthe-et-Moselle
- Arrondissement: Nancy
- Canton: Laxou
- Intercommunality: Métropole du Grand Nancy

Government
  - Mayor (2020–2026): Laurent Garcia
- Area^{1}: 15.94 km^{2} (6.15 sq mi)
- Highest elevation: 371 m (1,217 ft)
- Lowest elevation: 213 m (699 ft)
- Population (2023): 14,771
  - Density: 926.7/km^{2} (2,400/sq mi)
- Demonym: Laxovien(ne)s
- Time zone: UTC+01:00 (CET)
  - Summer (DST): UTC+02:00 (CEST)
- INSEE/Postal code: 54304 /54520
- Website: www.laxou.fr
- ^{1} French Land Register data, which excludes lakes, ponds, glaciers > 1 km^{2} (0.386 sq mi or 247 acres) and river estuaries.

Laxou (French pronunciation: [laksu]) is a commune in the Meurthe-et-Moselle department in north-eastern France. It is a suburb, adjacent to the west of Nancy.

2002 125cc motorcycle world champion Arnaud Vincent was born here.

== Population ==
Historical population
Year	Pop.	±% p.a.
1968	15,898	—
1975	16,766	+0.76%
1982	17,018	+0.21%
1990	15,490	−1.17%
1999	15,288	−0.15%
2007	14,875	−0.34%
2012	14,843	−0.04%
2017	14,444	−0.54%
2023	14,771	+0.37%
Source: INSEE

== See also ==
- Communes of the Meurthe-et-Moselle department
