= Lac de Gérardmer =

Glacial lake in France

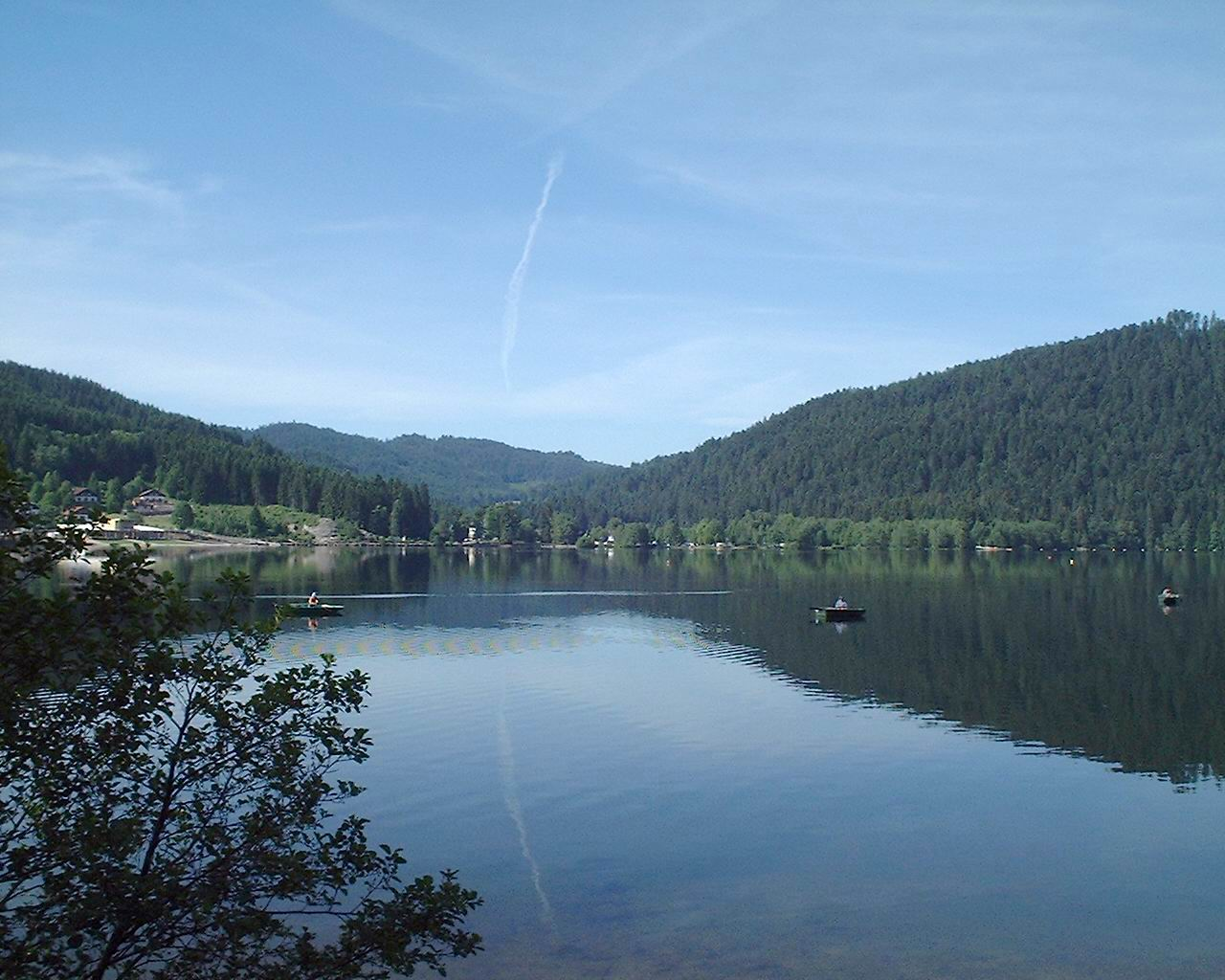

- Location within France
- Location: Gérardmer, Vosges
- Coordinates: 48°04′N 6°51′E
- Type: glacial
- Primary outflows: Jamagne
- Basin countries: France
- Max. length: 2.2 km (1.4 mi)
- Max. width: 0.75 km (0.47 mi)
- Surface area: 1.16 km^{2} (0.45 sq mi)
- Max. depth: 38.4 m (126 ft)
- Water volume: 19,510,000 m^{3} (689,000,000 cu ft)
- Surface elevation: 660 m (2,170 ft)

Lac de Gérardmer is a glacial lake at the city of Gérardmer, Vosges, France. It is located in the Vosges mountain range at an elevation of 660 m. With a surface area of 1.16 km² it is the largest natural lake in the Vosges mountain range.
