= Military career of Audie Murphy =

Audie L. Murphy
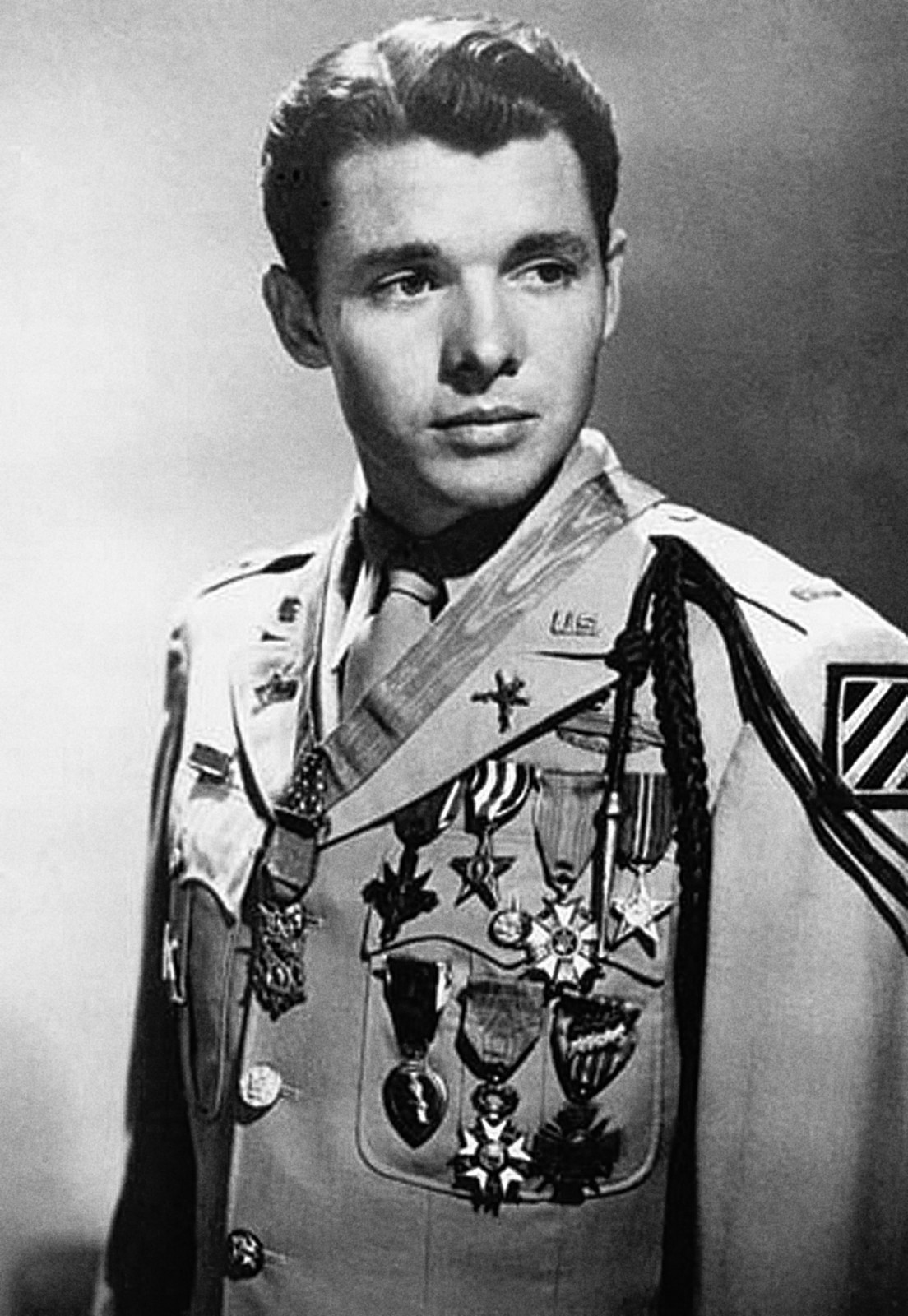
- Audie Murphy in full dress U. S. Army uniform
- Born: 20 June 1925; Kingston, Hunt County, Texas, U.S.
- Died: 28 May 1971 (aged 45); Brush Mountain, near Catawba, Virginia, U.S.
- Burial place: Arlington National Cemetery
- Military career
- Allegiance: United States
- Branch: United States Army; United States Army National Guard
- Service years: 1942–45 (U.S. Army); 1950–66 (Texas National Guard)
- Rank: First Lieutenant (USA); Major (Texas National Guard)
- Service number: 18083707 (as enlisted man); 01692509 (as officer)
- Units: 15th Infantry Regiment; 3rd Infantry Division (USA); 36th Infantry Division (Texas National Guard)
- Conflicts: World War II; Tunisia; Sicily; Naples-Foggia; Anzio; Rome-Arno; Southern France; Ardennes-Alsace; Rhineland; Central Europe
- Awards: Medal of Honor; Distinguished Service Cross; Silver Star (2); Legion of Merit; Bronze Star Medal (2, 1 "V" device); Purple Heart (3); Legion of Honour (France); Croix de Guerre with silver star (France); Croix de Guerre with palm (3, France); Croix de Guerre with palm (Belgium); Outstanding Civilian Service Medal; Texas Legislative Medal of Honor
- Other work: Actor; songwriter
- Website: Audie L. Murphy

The military career of Audie Murphy (20 June 1925 – 28 May 1971) encompassed two separate careers. His U. S. Army service covered nine World War II campaigns fought by the 3rd Infantry Division: Tunisia, Sicily, Naples-Foggia, Anzio, Rome-Arno, Southern France, Ardennes-Alsace, Rhineland and Central Europe. He lied about his age to enlist in the United States Army in 1942. Before his 20th birthday he had earned every Army combat award for valor available during his period of service (Note: Murphy's war service was combat-related. Therefore, he did not receive the non-combat Soldier's Medal. Act of Congress (Public Law 446–69th Congress, 2 July 1926 (44 Stat. 780)) established the Soldier's Medal for heroism "as defined in 10 USC 101(d), at the time of the heroic act who distinguished himself or herself by heroism not involving actual combat with the enemy." At the end of his World War II service, Murphy became known as America's most decorated soldier.) and had risen to the rank of first lieutenant. On the day he was awarded the Medal of Honor for his January 1945 actions at the Colmar Pocket in France, he was considered to be America's most decorated World War II soldier and received national recognition as such when Life magazine made him their cover story. He has been described as the most highly decorated soldier in U.S. history.

His superior officers, as well as the Speaker of the U. S. House of Representatives, encouraged him to apply for enrollment at West Point and offered to provide any assistance and influence needed to help him be accepted as a cadet. Murphy eventually passed on the opportunity of enrollment at West Point, in part because of limitations resulting from his war injuries. At the end of his active Army service, he was given 50 percent disability classification and transferred to the Officers' Reserve Corps. The psychological effects of the war remained with him for the rest of his life in the form of combat stress. Although the military did little for Murphy's post-war stress, he was publicly forthcoming about it in hopes of prodding the government into providing better treatment and medical benefits for other veterans suffering the same issues.

At the 1950 onset of the Korean War, Murphy was commissioned with the rank of captain in the 36th Infantry Division of the Texas National Guard. He was charged with training new recruits and fully believed that he and the 36th would be sent to the Korean front for combat duty. His film career began to take off in 1951, limiting Murphy's Guard involvement. The Korean Armistice Agreement of 1953 ended hostilities without the 36th ever being sent to Korea. Murphy, however, remained with the Guard actively participating in recruitment drives and allowing his name and image to be used for that purpose. He retired with the rank of major in 1966 and was transferred to the United States Army Reserve. In 1969 the Army transferred him to Retired Reserve. For his combined service in the Army and the Guard, his home state posthumously awarded Murphy the Texas Legislative Medal of Honor.

== United States Army ==
=== Enlistment and initial training ===
Murphy had wanted to be a soldier all his youth and dreamt about combat. The death of his mother in May 1941 added even more impetus to his desire to achieve that goal. When he heard the news of Japan's 7 December attack on Pearl Harbor he tried to enlist in the Marines, the Navy and the Army, but was turned down for being underweight and underage. He added weight with a change in diet, and gave the Army an affidavit from his sister Corinne that falsified his birth date by a year. (Note: Murphy's son Terry is the President of the Audie Murphy Research Foundation, which in both its biographical sketch and Murphy Family Tree list his year of birth as 1925. Murphy's date of birth has been given as both 1925 and 1924 by Murphy himself. He seemed to go back and forth on the dates for the rest of his life. His sister Corinne Burns as his nearest living kin signed a notarized document attesting to the birth date of 20 June 1924 that Murphy put on his enlistment application, falsifying his year of birth in order to make him appear old enough to meet the U.S. Army age qualification for enlistment. Subsequently, all military records show the falsified date as his birth date. His California driver's license showed a birth date of 1925.) Murphy enlisted on 30 June 1942 in Dallas. During his physical examination his height was recorded as 5 feet 5.5 inches (1.66 m) and his weight as 112 pounds (50.8 kg). (Note: Conflicting information exists as to Murphy's date and place of enlistment. The Audie L. Murphy Memorial website has scanned documents from the U.S. National Archives and Records Administration that include Corinne Burns' statement and Murphy's "Induction Record", which shows him "Enlisted at Dallas, Texas" on 30 June 1942, and the line above it says "Accepted for service at Greenville, Texas". The National Register of Historic Places Listing added the Greenville post office as historic site number 74002081 in 1974, citing it as Murphy's place of enlistment, possibly referring to the act the military termed "Accepted for service". The NRHP also shows his enlistment date as 20 June 1942 which might be the date he was accepted for service.) According to his biographer David A. Smith, Murphy acknowledged his birth date was falsified at his enlistment in a 1950 interview with the Austin Statesman: "'The doctor back home couldn't remember exactly when I was born,' he said with a smile, 'so I was 18.'"

Assigned to the infantry, during basic training at Camp Wolters, Texas, Murphy earned the Marksman Badge with Rifle Clasp and the Expert Badge with Bayonet Clasp. While participating in a close order drill during that hot Texas summer, he passed out. His company commander thought his build was too slight for service in the infantry, and tried to have him transferred to a cook and bakers' school, but Murphy insisted on becoming a combat soldier. He completed the 13-week basic training course and in October was given leave to visit his family, after which he was sent to Fort George G. Meade in Maryland for advanced infantry training with the 76th Infantry Division until January 1943.

=== Mediterranean Theater ===
==== North Africa ====
In January 1943, Murphy was processed through Camp Kilmer, New Jersey. He arrived at Casablanca, in French Morocco on 20 February and was assigned to Company B of the 1st Battalion, 15th Infantry Regiment, part of the 3rd Infantry Division.

As part of Operation Torch the Americans had seized Port Lyautey in French Morocco on 8 November 1942, and the 3rd Infantry Division was sent there on 7 March 1943. The 3rd Division, under the command of Major General Lucian K. Truscott, Jr., who took them through rigorous training at Arzew in Algeria, for an amphibious landing at Sicily. Private Murphy participated with his division in 30-mile (48 km) 8-hour marches, known as the "Truscott Trot". For the first hour, the men marched at a pace of 5 mph (8.0 km/h), and slowed to 4 mph (6.4 km/h) for the second hour, taking the final 21 miles (34 km) at a pace of 3.5 mph (5.6 km/h). They also performed bayonet and land mine drills, obstacle course training and other exercises. Murphy was promoted to private first class on 7 May. After the 13 May surrender of the Axis forces in French Tunisia, the division was put in charge of the prisoners. They returned to Algeria on 15 May for "Operation Copycat", training exercises in preparation for the assault landing in Sicily.

==== Italy ====
===== Sicily =====
The 3rd Infantry Division, as part of the U. S. Seventh Army under the command of Lieutenant General George S. Patton, sailed from Tunisia on 7 July,1943, for the Allied invasion of Sicily, landing at Licata on 10 July. Murphy was promoted to the rank of corporal on 15 July. Company B later took part in fighting around Canicattì, during which Murphy killed two fleeing Italian officers.

They arrived in Palermo on 20 July, and Murphy was sidelined by illness for a week. Allied capture of the transit port of Messina was crucial to taking Sicily from the Axis. En route there, Company B was assigned to a hillside location protecting a machine-gun emplacement, while the rest of the 3rd Infantry Division fought at San Fratello. The Axis began their evacuation of Messina on 27 July. Although the 3rd Infantry Division's 7th Infantry Regiment secured the port on 17 August, the Axis had already completed their evacuation hours before. During the fighting in Sicily, Murphy became realistic about military duty: "I have seen war as it actually is, and I do not like it. But I will go on fighting."

===== Mainland invasion =====
With Sicily secured from Axis forces, Supreme Commander General Dwight D. Eisenhower made the decision to invade Italy in early September 1943. As part of the Salerno landings, the 3rd Infantry Division came ashore at Battipaglia. One of the early skirmishes recounted by author Don Graham involved Murphy, his best friend Lattie Tipton (referred to as "Brandon" in Murphy's book To Hell and Back) and an unnamed soldier in their unit as they traveled along the Volturno River. The trio were near a bridge when the third soldier was killed by German machine-gun fire. Tipton tossed hand grenades in the direction of the fire and Murphy responded with a Thompson submachine gun, killing five German soldiers.

Allied forces entered Naples on 1 October. The 3rd Division took part in the Allied assault on the Volturno Line. Near Mignano Monte Lungo Hill 193, Company B repelled a reconnaissance by seven German soldiers, killing three and taking four prisoners.

Murphy was promoted to sergeant on 13 December. By this time, the 3rd Infantry Division had suffered heavy casualties: 683 dead, 170 missing, and 2,412 wounded.

===== Anzio =====
The 3rd Infantry Division was notified in December 1943 of the planned January 1944 storming of Anzio beachhead, the beginning of the liberation of Rome. The division began training near Naples and practiced an amphibious landing at Salerno. Murphy was made section leader on 4 January and promoted to staff sergeant on 13 January. He was hospitalized in Naples with malaria on 21 January, and was unable to participate in the initial landing commanded by Major General John P. Lucas. Murphy returned to his unit in time to take part in the unsuccessful First Battle of Cisterna, which was fought between 30 January and 1 February. It was the most fierce and sustained fighting Murphy had experienced to date.

Lieutenant Colonel Michael Paulick, commander of the 1st Battalion of the 15th Infantry, temporarily took charge of Company B when the company commander's wounds left him unable to lead. Paulick later stated that the ensuing 3-day battle decimated the company, leaving fewer than 30 soldiers alive.

If the suffering of men could do the job, the German lines would be split wide open. Replacements cannot begin to keep pace with the slaughter. Some of the companies have been reduced to twenty men. Not a yard of ground has been gained by the murderous three days of assault. A doomlike quality hangs over the beachhead.

— Audie Murphy, To Hell and Back

Lucas was replaced in February by Truscott. Command of the 3rd Division went to Major General John "Iron Mike" O'Daniel. The men were forced back to Anzio and remained there for months. Taking shelter in an abandoned farmhouse on 2 March, their artillery fire disabled a German tank. Although the tank crew were killed as they tried to escape, Murphy knew the tank could be repaired by the Germans and put back into use. Leaving his men in the farmhouse, Murphy advanced towards the tank by crawling on his stomach. He then used rifle grenades to permanently put the tank out of commission. For this action, he received the Bronze Star with "V" Device. Murphy continued to make scouting patrols to take German prisoners before being hospitalized for a week on 13 March with a second bout of malaria.

The 3rd Division was taken off the front line in late March and placed in reserve status. From 1 to 11 April, the Division was put through additional combat training at Torre Astura. The training was so intense that Murphy felt his men needed relief and refused to put them through the required close order drill. Although already recommended for a promotion to technical sergeant, his refusal on behalf of his men cost him the promotion. Upon completion of the training, Murphy and his men occupied the area of Campo Morto-Padigliano. On 1 May, the 3rd Division was sent back to Torre Astura, where they remained until 21 May. 61 infantry officers and enlisted men of Company B, 15th Infantry, including Murphy, were awarded the Combat Infantryman Badge on 8 May. Murphy was also awarded an Oak Leaf Cluster for his Bronze Star.

The 3rd Division began its assault of German troops in the Second Battle of Cisterna on 22 May, and by 25 May, Cisterna and Cori were in Allied hands. Audie's platoon moved towards Artena on 26 to 27 May, regrouping with the Division at Valmontone. Combat action 29 May to 1 June put Valmontone and Labico under Allied control. After Rome was liberated, the Division was assigned to patrol the city 6 to 15 June. The Division was moved to southwest of Rome 16 June where they remained bivouacked until the end of July. Murphy was made platoon sergeant on 4 August. He moved out of Italy with the Division on 8 August 1944.

=== European Theater ===
==== Southern and southeastern France ====
The U.S. Seventh Army under the command of Lieutenant General Alexander Patch was the initial amphibious landing force for the 15 August 1944 Allied invasion of southern France, known as Operation Dragoon. The 3rd Infantry Division was still under the command of Major General O'Daniel. At 0800 military time, they came ashore on Yellow Beach near Ramatuelle with the first wave of the assault. They began to move inland through a vineyard. As the 3rd Platoon progressed toward an incline, one of their light machine gun squads became separated. German soldiers began firing at them, initially killing one and wounding another. Murphy ran out alone to locate the lost squad and led them back to the unit. He then used the machine gun to return fire at the German soldiers, killing two and wounding one. When he relinquished the machine gun back to his men and took up a new position, he was joined by his best friend Lattie Tipton. At that moment, two Germans exited a house about 100 yards (91 m) away, and feigned surrender by waving a white flag. Tipton believed it to be a real surrender gesture, and made himself visible, beckoning to the German soldiers to come towards him. He was immediately killed by machine gun fire coming from within the house.

I remember the experience as I do a nightmare. A demon seems to have entered my body. My brain is coldly alert and logical. I do not think of the danger to myself. My whole being is concentrated on killing.

— Audie Murphy, To Hell and Back

Murphy advanced alone on the house, seemingly impervious to the German fire being directed at him. He wounded two Germans, killed six, and took the others as prisoners. His actions that day took approximately one hour, during which he killed eight German soldiers, wounded three and took eleven as prisoners. Murphy received the Distinguished Service Cross.

During 27–28 August, at Montélimar, Murphy and the 1st Battalion, 15th Infantry Regiment, 3rd Infantry Division, along with the 36th Infantry Division, engaged in an offensive battle to secure the area from the Germans. The 3rd and 36th Divisions took 500 prisoners in the city on 29 August. For these actions the 1st Battalion of the 15th Infantry Regiment received the Presidential Unit Citation.

==== Northeastern France ====
The 3rd Infantry Division was part of an offensive plan to break through German resistance in northeastern France, as far as Saint-Dié-des-Vosges. In the area of Genevreuille on 15 September 1944, Murphy narrowly escaped death from an exploding mortar shell that killed two others and wounded three. Although his resulting heel wound was not serious, he received his first Purple Heart. By this point, all but Murphy and two others of Company B's original group had either been killed or taken off the lines with wounds. General O'Daniel moved the 15th Infantry, 3rd Division to the Moselle and the Cleurie valley in late September. Stone quarries dotted the hills and provided good defensive positions for the Germans. The 15th was met with fierce resistance north of St. Ame at the heavily fortified multi-tunneled L'Omet quarry. On 2 October at L'Omet, Murphy advanced alone to the location of a machine gun manned by a unit of German soldiers. Within 15 yards (14 m) of the machine gun nest, he rose to his feet. "The Germans spot me instantly", he recalled. "The gunner spins the tip of his weapon toward me. But the barrel catches in a limb, and the burst whizzes to my right". Murphy lobbed two hand grenades at the men, killing four and wounding three. He was awarded the Silver Star for this action. The 15th achieved success in its continued attack when Germans began evacuating the quarry on 5 October. On that date, Murphy, while carrying a SCR-536 radio, advanced alone for 50 yards (46 m) towards the Germans while they continually fired directly at him. Around 200 yards (180 m) from the Germans' location, he relayed firing orders by radio to the artillery, and remained at his position alone for an hour directing his men. When Murphy's men finally took the hill, 15 German combatants were killed and 35 wounded. Murphy's actions earned him an Oak Leaf Cluster for his Silver Star.

Murphy was awarded a battlefield commission to second lieutenant on 14 October, which elevated him to platoon leader. Operation Dogface was the 3rd Infantry Division's support role for the VI Corps in securing Bruyères and Brouvelieures, with the goal of getting the U. S. Sixth Army Group through the Belfort Gap by November. While en route to Brouvelieures on 26 October, the 3rd Platoon of Company B was attacked by a group of German snipers. Murphy captured two before being shot in the hip by another sniper whom he in turn killed.

Because of the rain and the mud, we cannot be evacuated for three days. We lie on cots, six to a pyramidal tent, while the fever spreads through our flesh. Delirious men moan and curse.

— Audie Murphy, To Hell and Back

The wounded waited at an aid station for hours for their turn with a medic. After the 3-day delay caused by the weather, they were transported to the 3rd General Hospital at Aix-en-Provence, where they were met with more delays before treatment and hospitalization. Gangrene developed in Murphy's wound, for which he was treated with penicillin and multiple surgeries to remove the dead tissue. He remained hospitalized until 28 December 1944. As a result of the injury, Murphy received the first Oak Leaf Cluster for his Purple Heart.

===== Colmar Pocket =====
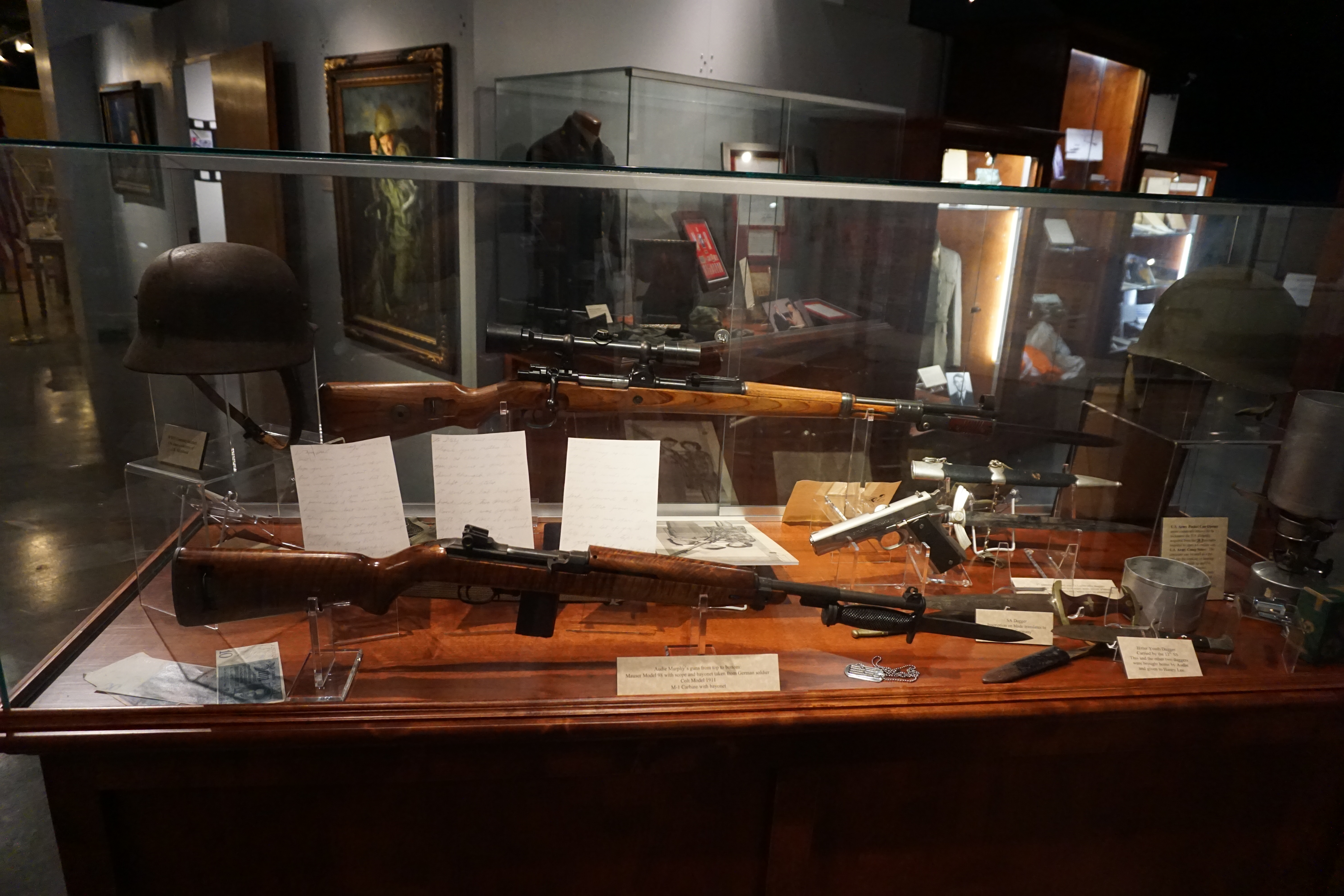
Murphy's M1911 pistol, M1 carbine, and (captured) Mauser Model 98 on display at the Audie Murphy American Cotton Museum

The Colmar Pocket was 850 square miles (2,200 km^{2}) in the Vosges Mountains and had been held by German troops since November 1944. Murphy was still hospitalized on 15 December when General O'Daniel moved the 3rd Infantry Division into the area. Murphy described it as

a huge and dangerous bridgehead thrusting west of the Rhine like an iron fist. Fed with men and materiel from across the river, it is a constant threat to our right flank; and potentially it is a perfect springboard from which the enemy could start a powerful counterattack.

He rejoined his platoon on 14 January 1945, the date Lieutenant General Jacob Devers ordered the 3rd Division reinforced by the 28th Infantry Division. The 3rd Division engaged in sixteen days of battle to secure the bridgeheads west of the Rhine at the Colmar Canal. After crossing the Ill river through the Riedwihr Woods on 24 January, the 3rd Division was ordered to the town of Holtzwihr, where they met with a strong German counterattack. Two officers in the division were killed by mortar shells in an attack the following day during which Murphy was wounded in both legs, and for which he received a second Oak Leaf Cluster for his Purple Heart.

From its peak of 235 men, disease, injuries and casualties had reduced Company B's fighting strength to 18 men. Murphy being the only officer remaining on 26 January was made the company commander. The company awaited reinforcements as Murphy watched the approaching Germans,

I see the Germans lining up for an attack. Six tanks rumble to the outskirts of Holtzwihr, split into groups of threes, and fan out toward either side of the clearing. Then wave after wave of white dots, barely discernible against the background of snow, start across the field. They are enemy infantrymen.

The Germans scored a direct hit on an M10 tank destroyer, setting it on fire and causing its crew to abandon it. Murphy ordered his men to retreat to positions in the woods, remaining alone at his post shooting his M1 carbine and relaying orders via his telephone while the Germans aimed fire directly at his position. Murphy mounted the abandoned, burning tank destroyer and began firing its .50 caliber machine gun at the advancing Germans, killing a squad crawling through a ditch towards him.

It was like standing on top of a time bomb ... he was standing on the TD chassis, exposed to enemy fire from his ankles to his head and silhouetted against the trees and the snow behind him.

— Eyewitness account of Pvt. Anthony V. Abramski

For an hour, Murphy stood on the tank destroyer returning German fire from foot soldiers and advancing tanks, during which he sustained a leg wound. He stopped only after he ran out of ammunition.

As if under the influence of some drug, I slide off the tank destroyer and, without once looking back, walk down the road through the forest. If the Germans want to shoot me, let them. I am too weak from fear and exhaustion to care.

— Audie Murphy, To Hell and Back

He rejoined his men with complete disregard for his own wound, leading them back to successfully repel the Germans. Only afterwards would he allow treatment of his leg wound, and still insisted on remaining with his men.

... during his indomitable one-man struggle, Lieutenant Murphy broke the entire attack of the Germans and held hard-won ground that it would have been disastrous to lose.

— Eyewitness account of Sergeant Elmer C. Brawley

While standing on the burning tank destroyer Murphy killed or wounded 50 Germans. For his actions that day he was awarded the Medal of Honor.

On 4 February, Murphy led Company B in a battle to successfully rid the Jewish Cemetery near Biesheim of German troops holed up inside, killing six and taking the remainder prisoner. Two days later, Company B advanced to Neuf-Brisach. By 8 February, the city of Colmar surrendered to combined Allied forces, ending the battle. The 3rd Division was charged with guarding the Rhine west bank 10 to 18 February. Murphy was promoted to first lieutenant on 16 February. The 3rd Infantry Division was awarded the Presidential Unit Citation for its actions. which earned Murphy an Oak Leaf Cluster for the PUC awarded for action at Montelimar.

While the Division was stationed at Nancy, General O'Daniel held a ceremony on 5 March to award Murphy his previously won Distinguished Service Cross and Silver Star. Murphy was reassigned as 15th Infantry Regiment liaison officer on 11 March. From then until 20 May, he was assigned to the Director for Plans and Operations, a non-combat assignment that moved with the regiment. Although not authorized to do so, he did step out of that role when a message arrived that Company B's senior officers had been killed, leaving the unit in charge of an inexperienced officer. He commandeered a jeep, a driver and an interpreter and advanced to the Siegfried Line to successfully rescue the company.

===== Medal of Honor and other decorations =====
Army version of the Medal of Honor

Brigadier General Ralph B. Lovett and Lieutenant Colonel Hallet D. Edson recommended Murphy for the Medal of Honor for his actions at Holtzwihr, the awarding of which was confirmed by an official press release on 24 May 1945. Near Salzburg, Austria on 2 June, General Patch presented Murphy with both the Medal of Honor and the Legion of Merit. As of that presentation, Murphy was then considered "the most decorated American soldier in World War II." When asked after the war why he had seized the machine gun and taken on an entire company of German infantry, Murphy replied simply, "They were killing my friends." For his war-time service, Murphy had earned every Army combat award for valor available during his period of service.

He was awarded the American Campaign Medal, the European-African-Middle Eastern Campaign Medal with nine combat campaign stars (one silver representing 5, and 4 bronze) and one arrowhead device for amphibious landings in Sicily and Southern France, the World War II Victory Medal, and the Army of Occupation Medal with Germany Clasp.

On 16 April 1945, France awarded Murphy the French Croix de guerre with Silver Star, which was presented to him in Dallas on 15 September by U.S. Army Brigadier General William Albert Collier. At a public ceremony in Paris on 19 July 1948, French General Jean de Lattre de Tassigny presented Murphy the French Legion of Honor – Grade of Chevalier and the French Croix de guerre with Palm. He was also the recipient of the French Liberation Medal. (Note: The medal appears on the official medal count as provided by the Army Resources Command Center to the Toledo Blade, and in a 1979 letter to Pamela Murphy from the Army.) Belgium awarded Murphy the Belgian Croix de guerre with 1940 Palm on 10 December 1955. (Note: The Belgian award was forwarded to the U.S. Pentagon, pending Congressional approval, where the award remained until the United States Congress passed Public Law 89-673, Foreign Gifts and Decorations Act of 1966. The U.S. Army forwarded the award to Murphy on 16 March 1968.)

The 3rd Infantry Division received the Croix de guerre with Palm as a unit award, and all individual members were awarded the French Fourragère.

=== Homecoming and discharge ===
Murphy received orders on 8 June 1945, to report to Fort Sam Houston in San Antonio, Texas. At a 13 June San Antonio homecoming parade held for returning Texas veterans, a quarter of a million people cheered Murphy, Charles P. Cabell, Lucian Truscott, Harold L. Clark and others. He was then assigned to the Army Ground & Services Redistribution Station at the base and given 30 days leave. Murphy was the home grown hero, and on a visit to Dallas, the media followed his every move, interviewing and photographing him. Farmersville (Note: Although Murphy had been born near Kingston in Hunt County, the family moved around. His maternal grandparents lived in Farmersville, as did his sister Corinne Burns. Prior to entering the military, Murphy had been employed at Farmersville. He used Corinne's address as his address of record during World War II.) pulled out all the stops, giving him an escort caravan, and five thousand local citizens showed up to hear a band concert and speeches in his honor. He was the star attraction at the 2 to 4 July McKinney rodeo where he opened the event every night. The 16 July issue of Life magazine brought Murphy national attention when its cover story proclaimed him "most decorated" next to a smiling image of him in full dress uniform. Photographers for the magazine followed him to a birthday party in his honor, to his first civilian haircut since 1942, and around to visit friends and relatives.

While on leave, he discussed with family and friends the possibility of his enrolling in West Point and making the Army a lifetime career. Inquiries on his behalf had been sent through military channels before he left Europe, and Patch had encouraged him to enroll. Both Edson and Paulick had also counseled Murphy about attending the military academy, with Paulick offering to tutor him for the entrance examinations. Speaker of the U. S. House of Representatives Sam Rayburn supported the idea and offered to use his influence to help Murphy enroll at West Point. Murphy expressed concerns to Edison and others that his war injuries might prevent him from passing the physical examination required to enroll. Texas A&M University was another military school Murphy considered as a possibility. In the end, he enrolled in neither school. A belated Good Conduct Medal was presented to Murphy on 21 August. He was discharged with the rank of first lieutenant at a 50 percent disability classification on 21 September and transferred to the Officers' Reserve Corps. (Note: The Officers' Reserve Corps was originally one of several units of the United States Organized Reserve that also included the Enlisted Reserve Corps, Reserve Officers' Training Corps and the Civilian Conservation Corps. The Organized Reserve was restructured during the Korean War and renamed the United States Army Reserve. The new structure was divided into the Ready Reserve, Standby Reserve and Retired Reserve.)

=== Post-war trauma ===
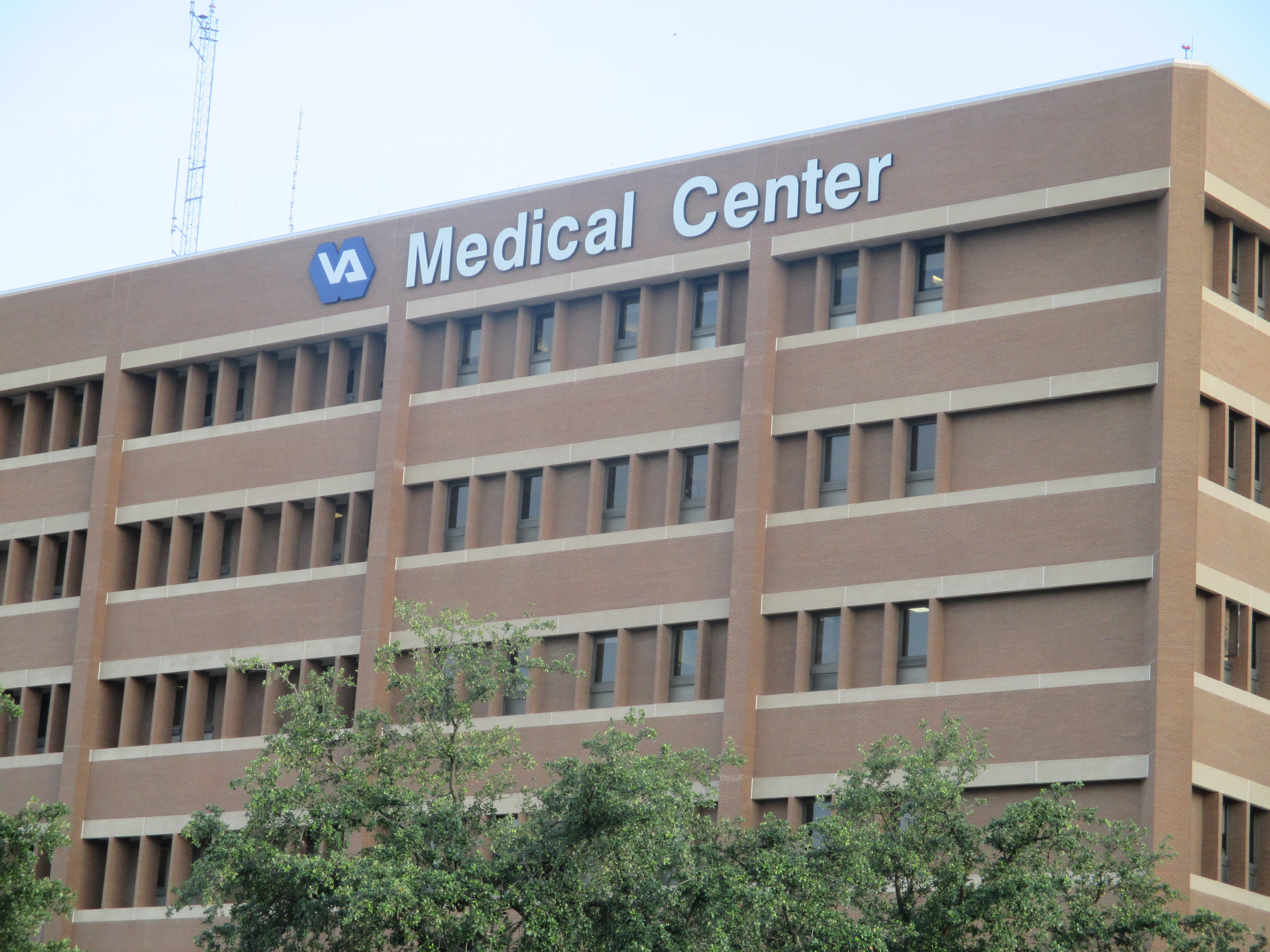
Audie L. Murphy Memorial VA Hospital in San Antonio, Texas

When Murphy returned from World War II, symptoms of combat stress immediately became evident to family and friends. He was on medication for stomach problems and tightly wound, with any unexpected sound triggering a defensive reflex reaction to an imagined attack. When he slept, it was with a loaded pistol under his pillow. Recurring nightmares had him reliving the war, repeatedly calling out to individual soldiers. Turning the lights on sometimes brought relief, if only to keep him from falling asleep again. He had waking graphic flashbacks that caused him to freeze, reliving a life-threatening moment on the battlefield. His first wife, Wanda Hendrix, stated that he once held her at gunpoint. She witnessed her husband being moved to tears by newsreel footage of German war orphans, guilt-ridden that his war actions might have been the cause of their having no parents. As others had noticed since his return from Europe, Hendrix said his dreams were punctuated with the battles he had fought. She tried to coax him into seeking psychiatric help. During a publicity tour in 1952, his dreams caused him to beat the wall of his motel room until his fists bled.

His service medical records reveal that the Army was aware of the symptoms and provided sleeping pills. There is no indication that the military otherwise provided any counseling or treatment for his post-combat stress. Murphy briefly found a creative stress outlet in writing poetry after his Army discharge. His poem "The Crosses Grow on Anzio" appeared in his book To Hell and Back, but was attributed to the fictitiously named Kerrigan. In the mid-1960s, he recognized his dependence on Placidyl, and locked himself alone in a hotel room for a week to successfully break the addiction. His friend David "Spec" McClure who helped him write the book said he never recovered from the war. In an effort to draw attention to the combat–related problems of returning Korean War and Vietnam War veterans, Murphy spoke out candidly about his own problems. He called on the government to give increased consideration and study to the emotional impact of combat experiences, and to extend Veteran's Administration benefits to cover combat stress treatment.

After the war, they took Army dogs and rehabilitated them for civilian life. But they turned soldiers into civilians immediately, and let 'em sink or swim.

— Audie Murphy

== Texas National Guard ==
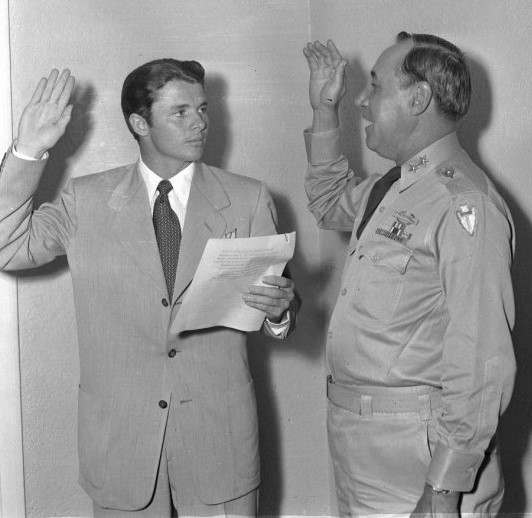
Murphy being sworn into the Texas National Guard by MG H. Miller Ainsworth, 14 July 1950

The 36th Infantry Division was federalized as part of the United States Army during both World War I and World War II. It was called the Texas Division due to most of its members being from the Texas National Guard. During World War II, they were in Operation Dragoon and participated in the same battles to liberate Rome as Murphy had. At the end of the war, the 36th reverted to state control as part of the Texas National Guard. When the Korean War commenced on 25 June 1950, the 36th looked to recruit experienced veterans to help it gain federal recognition. Major General H. Miller Ainsworth and Brigadier General Carl L. Phinney were the 36th's commander and deputy commander respectively. Both men were acquaintances of Murphy, who at the time was being considered for the lead in The Red Badge of Courage. He was having doubts about his acting career and was considering re-enlisting in the Army. The onset of the Korean War became the deciding factor in his returning to active military service, and he believed the 36th would be deployed to Korea. On 14 July, Murphy was accompanied by Ainsworth to his physical examination at Camp Mabry. As of his swearing in with the rank of captain in the Guard, he received federal recognition of the promotion in rank from first lieutenant to captain. Attending a lunch for Murphy afterwards were Ainsworth, Phinney, 36th Chief of Staff Colonel James E. Taylor and the State Director of the Selective Service Brigadier General Paul Wakefield. A press conference followed during which Murphy expressed his concerns that World War III was about to erupt.

Murphy was initially assigned to the Intelligence Office headquarters, 1st Battalion, 141st Infantry as S-2, and attended the Guard's two-week summer training at Fort Hood as a range officer. 19 December 1950, Murphy was transferred to division headquarters as an aide to Ainsworth. At the 1951 summer training camp at Fort Polk, Louisiana, Murphy was in charge of training approximately 500 inexperienced new recruits in bayonet, marksmanship and close order drill. Fellow instructor Captain Tom Berry remembered, "In my opinion, Audie Murphy set the tone for the obvious high esprit de corps for the 36th Division which lasted throughout my association with the Division [eighteen years]. Audie Murphy walked the way he talked."

On 1 October 1951, he requested a transfer to inactive status due to his film commitments with MGM Studios. On 21 January 1952, Murphy was relieved of his assignment as aide. Fort Hood was the location of the 1952 summer training camp, during which Murphy was in charge of field application of classroom training. The 1953 summer training at Fort Hood once again had Murphy in charge of bayonet training. The Korean Armistice Agreement was signed on 27 July, without the 36th having been called up. He missed the 1954 summer training camp due to his location shooting for To Hell and Back

During his service, he granted the Guard permission to use his name and image in recruiting materials. His activities aside from being an instructor at the training camps also included touring the state to make unit inspections and to visit local commanders. On 22 June 1955, Murphy requested a temporary waiver of his Army disability pension from the Veteran's Administration while he was put on active duty with the Guard. 6 July 1955, at his request, Murphy's status with the Guard was changed back to active. In doing so, he hoped to be promoted to the rank of major, in spite of his being short on the requirement of first serving seven years as a captain. He was recommended by several superior officers; Major General K. L. Berry, Adjutant General of the Texas National Guard, requested a waiver for the 7-year requirement to the National Guard Bureau in Washington D.C. The waiver was granted and Murphy was promoted by the Guard to major on 14 February 1956, receiving federal recognition of the promotion in rank from captain to major. Upon attaining the new rank, Murphy and General Phinney toured the state of Texas to help promote the "Guard Muster Recruiting Drive" set for 22 February. 1 July 1957, Murphy transferred back to inactive status, and remained inactive until his separation from the Guard as of 7 November 1966. On 8 November 1966, he transferred to the United States Army Reserve, and remained with the USAR until his 1969 transfer to the Retired Reserve.

On 18 August 2013, Texas Governor Rick Perry signed bill HCR3, which authorized the awarding of the Texas Legislative Medal of Honor to Murphy. It is the highest military decoration that may be awarded to a member of the Texas military, and was awarded in recognition of Murphy's combined military service in the Army and the Guard. The medal was presented to Murphy's sister Nadine at a public ceremony in Farmersville, Texas on 29 October 2013.

== Service ranks ==
Audie Murphy promotions and commissions
Image	Rank	Service Branch	Date of promotion	Refs.
	Private	U.S. Army	30 June 1942	
	Private First Class	U.S. Army	7 May 1943	
	Corporal	U.S. Army	15 July 1943	
	Sergeant	U.S. Army	13 December 1943	
	Staff Sergeant	U.S. Army	13 January 1944	
	Second Lieutenant	U.S. Army	14 October 1944	
	First Lieutenant	U.S. Army	16 February 1945	
	First Lieutenant	U.S. Army Reserve	21 August 1945	
	Captain	Texas National Guard	14 July 1950	
	Captain	U.S. National Guard	19 October 1950	
	Major	U.S. National Guard	14 February 1956	
	Major	Texas National Guard	14 February 1956	
	Major	U.S. Army Reserve	8 November 1966	
	Major	U.S. Army Retired Reserve	22 May 1969	

== Death ==
In his civilian life, Murphy was at odds with what he perceived as an innate film industry culture of phoniness, once likening his own acting career to prostitution. He was uncomfortable being an iconic war hero, and felt used because of that image. However, he often spoke of his kinship with the military, "I have to admit that I love the damned Army. It was father, mother, brother to me for years. It made me somebody, gave me self-respect." Although he was officially retired from the military when he died in a private plane crash on 28 May 1971 at Brush Mountain, near Catawba, Virginia, his ties to the military and to his home state were evident in the aftermath.

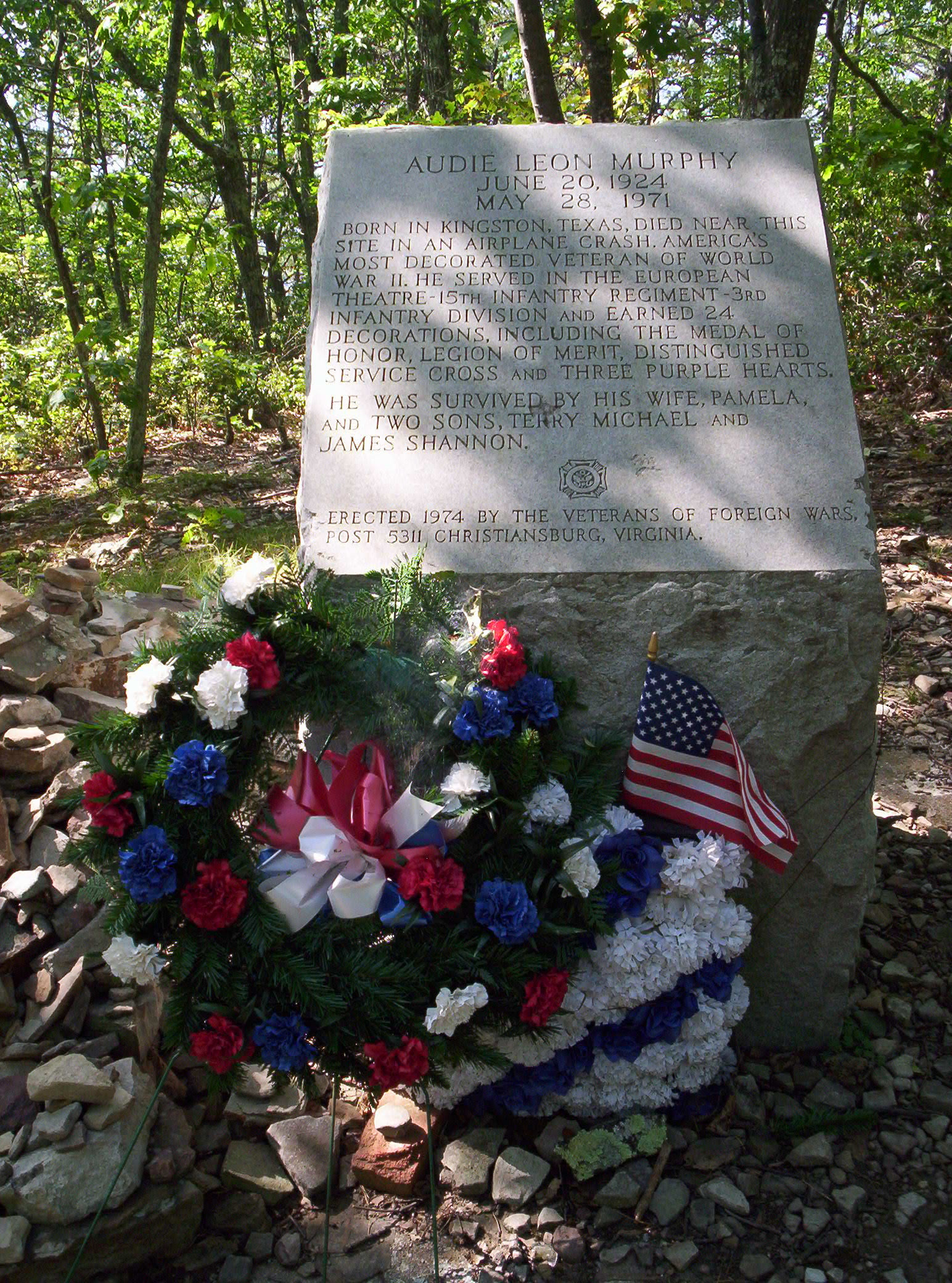
Monument at the site of the plane crash in which Audie Murphy died

The Texas state legislature ordered all flags on state buildings to be flown at half staff to honor Murphy. The memorial service held in his hometown of Farmersville, Texas, was in part sponsored by the Thomas Glenn Caraway Post of the VFW, and Farmersville businesses closed their doors for an hour in memoriam. His eulogy at the memorial service in the Hollywood Hills was delivered by an Army chaplain. While very few Hollywood celebrities attended, among the mourners were six Medal of Honor recipients, General John W. O'Daniel and several 3rd Infantry Division veterans who had fought with him. A month later, on 4 July, Sacramento, California, canceled its annual Independence Day parade because Murphy was to have been the grand marshal. In its place a memorial service at Capitol Park was attended mostly by veterans. He was buried at Arlington National Cemetery with full military honors on 7 June. The U.S. Army Band marched in front of six black horses that pulled the caisson with his flag-draped casket from Fort Myer Chapel to the cemetery. Among the mourners at the cemetery were government dignitaries and multiple veterans groups.

As a result of legislation introduced by U.S. Congressman Olin Teague five months after Murphy's death in 1971, the Audie L. Murphy Memorial VA Hospital in San Antonio, now a part of the South Texas Veterans Health Care System, was dedicated in 1973. VFW Post 5311 in Virginia worked for 3 years with the United States Forest Service for permission to erect a monument at the site of Murphy's death. Made from a donated granite slab and carved by a stonecutter who volunteered his services, other expenses involved were paid for by Post 5311. Members dug the road and cleared the area where the monument was dedicated on 10 November 1974.
