= Weldon, Texas =

- Unincorporated community
- Location within Texas Location within the United States
- Coordinates: 31°01′18″N 95°34′17″W
- Country: United States
- State: Texas
- County: Houston
- Elevation: 249 ft (76 m)

Population (2000)
  - Total: 131
- Time zone: UTC-6 (Central (CST))
  - Summer (DST): UTC-5 (CDT)
- ZIP code: 75835
- GNIS feature ID: 1371008

Weldon is an unincorporated community in Houston County, Texas, United States. According to the Handbook of Texas, the community had a population of 131 in 2000.

== History ==
The Weldon area was settled sometime after the Civil War. A post office was established at Weldon in 1869. The community became a lumber town when the Waco, Beaumont, Trinity and Sabine Railway built a track through the settlement in the 1880s. With 150 residents in 1885, the community's businesses consisted of saw and gristmills, a cotton gin, two general stores, a drugstore, and a meat market. It continued to be a successful community in the 1910s and 1920s and by the 1930s, the population grew to 200 and still had several businesses. It plunged to 80 by 1950, then grew to 131 from 1990 through 2000.

On May 11, 2021, an EF0 tornado struck Weldon.

The Beaumont and Great Northern Railroad operated an orphan line from Livingston to Weldon.

== Geography ==
Weldon is located on Farm to Market Road 230, 21 mi (34 km) south of Crockett in southern Houston County.

== Education ==
The community's first school opened in either the 1870s or 1880s. Weldon is served by the Lovelady Independent School District.

== USAAF TB-25C Plane Crash ==
On July 14, 1945, a USAAF North American TB-25C (trainer variant) suffering apparent engine trouble crashed one mile northwest of Weldon, killing 11 passengers and crew. The airplane exploded into flames upon impact with the ground, scattering wreckage over an area of 400 yards.

== Notable people ==
- M. B. Etheredge: awarded the Texas Legislative Medal of Honor for his actions during battle in World War II.
- Quentin P. Smith, airman who served as a B-25 bombardier with the Tuskegee Airmen during World War II.
