= Edlin (disambiguation) =

Edlin is a line editor included with MS-DOS and later Microsoft operating systems.

Edlin may also refer to:

- Aaron Edlin, US economist
- Herbert L. Edlin (1913–1976), British botanist and forester
- Robert Thomas Edlin, recipient of US Distinguished Service Cross
