= Darryn Deen Andrews =

American soldier

- Texas Legislative Medal of Honor
- Born: Darryn Deen Andrews; 3 July 1975; Ogden, Utah, U.S.
- Died: 4 September 2009 (aged 34); KIA in Paktika Province, Afghanistan
- Burial place: Fort Sam Houston National Cemetery
- Military career
- Allegiance: United States
- Branch: United States Army
- Service years: 2002–2009 (U.S. Army)
- Rank: 2nd Lieutenant (USA)
- Unit: 25th Infantry Division
- Conflicts: Operation Enduring Freedom; War in Afghanistan
- Awards: Silver Star; Bronze Star; Purple Heart; Afghanistan Campaign Medal; Combat Infantryman Badge; Parachutist Badge; Texas Legislative Medal of Honor

Darryn Deen Andrews (July 3, 1975 – September 4, 2009) was posthumously awarded the Silver Star and the Texas Legislative Medal of Honor for his actions during battle in Operation Enduring Freedom. Texas House Concurrent Resolution No 198 conferring the honor was adopted by both the House and Senate in May 2013 and approved by Governor Rick Perry in June 2013. Darryn is also honored on the Middle East Conflicts Wall Memorial in Marseilles, Illinois, Panel 5-C, Row 9.

== Early life ==
Darryn was born in Ogden, Utah and grew up in Cameron, Texas. He graduated from C. H. Yoe High School, where he played on the football, baseball, and basketball teams, served on the student council, and participated in the UIL one-act play competition. He went on to earn a bachelor's degree in business from Texas Tech University and a master's degree in education administration from Texas State University. Inspired by his grandfather, John E. Brown, a MIA/POW during World War II, and after the events of 9/11, he tried three times to enlist; the first two attempts were ended by medical problems, but on his third attempt, he was accepted, and in 2004, he joined the U.S. Army as an enlisted man, intending to make the military his career.

== House Concurrent Resolution No 198 ==
Representative Charles Schwertner sponsored the resolution. Below is an excerpt from the resolution:

501st Parachute Infantry Regiment

WHEREAS, Assigned to the 1st Battalion, 501st Parachute Infantry Regiment, 4th Brigade Combat Team (Airborne), 25th Infantry Division, out of Fort Richardson, Alaska, Lieutenant Andrews was serving his second tour of duty in Afghanistan in September 2009 when his unit was attacked with an improvised explosive device and a rocket-propelled grenade; with no thought for his own safety, Lieutenant Andrews tackled three of his comrades to protect them from being hit; he died of the wounds he incurred in that act of selfless courage.

== Personal life ==
Darryn married Julie Smith February 26, 2007 and had one son, Daylan. Julie was expecting a daughter when Darryn was killed in action.
