= M. B. Etheredge =

United States Army officer

M B Etheredge
- Texas Legislative Medal of Honor
- Born: Mode Barbee Etheredge; 7 June 1915; Weldon, Texas, U.S.
- Died: 15 May 2014 (aged 98); Huntsville, Texas, U.S.
- Burial place: Oakwood Cemetery, Huntsville, Texas, U.S.
- Military career
- Allegiance: United States of America
- Branch: United States Army; Texas National Guard
- Service years: 1942–45 (U.S. Army)
- Rank: Lt Colonel (USA); Lt Colonel (Texas National Guard)
- Unit: 30th Infantry Regiment
- Conflicts: World War II; Tunisia; Rome-Arno; Southern France
- Awards: Silver Star (3); Bronze Star (2); Purple Heart (2); World War II Victory; Armed Forces Reserve; French Croix de Guerre; Combat Infantryman Badge; Texas Legislative Medal of Honor
- Other work: Educator, Legislator

M. B. Etheredge (June 7, 1915 – May 15, 2014) was an American soldier who was awarded the Texas Legislative Medal of Honor by the Texas Legislature for his actions during battle in World War II. House Concurrent Resolution No. 27 conferring the honor was adopted by both the House and Senate in May 2003 and approved by Governor Rick Perry in June 2003.

== Early life ==
M. B. Etheredge was born in Weldon, Texas and at an early age determined to attend college, he left home and worked so that he could graduate from an accredited high school. In 1937 he received a biology degree from Sam Houston State Teachers College, where he served as both president of the senior class and as captain of the track team. Following his graduation from college, he began his career in public education as a teacher in Sugar Land and in 1941, at the age of 26, Etheredge became the youngest school superintendent in the state when he accepted a position in Damon. One year later, Etheredge volunteered for the United States Army and during his tours of duty in Africa, Italy, and France, he distinguished himself as one of the most highly decorated Americans to serve in World War II. At the conclusion of the war, he continued his career in the military, attaining the rank of lieutenant colonel during his meritorious service in the Texas National Guard. Colonel Etheredge also returned to school receiving his master's degree from Sam Houston State Teachers College in 1947 and pursuing postgraduate studies as a Peabody scholar at The University of Texas at Austin.

== House Concurrent Resolution No 27 ==
Representatives Dan Ellis and Lois Kolkhorst of Brenham co-sponsored the resolution. Here is the text:

On the night of March 12 13, 1944, Col. Etheredge was assistant commander of a combat patrol when it came under heavy machine gun fire north of Carano, Italy; disregarding the bullets flying all about him, he personally led his squad in a successful assault on the machine gun; when a second machine gun erupted, he again braved the barrage as he directed his men in laying down fire, allowing the main part of the patrol to advance against the gun and silence it.

Farther along, a third strong point opened heavy fire; once more, Col. Etheredge moved about aggressively in the midst of this attack, developing a strong firing line and enabling the main body of the patrol to skirt the house and continue on its mission; altogether, the patrol killed at least 10 Germans, captured 12, and knocked out two machine guns, and Col. Etheredge's remarkable gallantry and leadership in this operation earned for him a Silver Star.

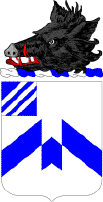
30th Infantry Regiment

Two months later, on May 23, 1944, in Italy, Col. Etheredge immediately took charge of Company "K," 30th Infantry Regiment, when the commanding officer and other key personnel were cut down; deciding to continue the attack, he ignored heavy fire to move up and down a ditch for 75 yards, reorganizing his company and bolstering its morale; though wounded in the leg, he then led his men running and crawling into the face of steady small arms fire for some 550 yards, rested them for 10 minutes, and then resumed the assault, advancing another 250 yards, overrunning the objective and organizing an all‑around defensive position.

Col. Etheredge's actions were instrumental in securing a vital battalion target, relieving pressure on two flank companies, and opening a way for a third company to advance; his critical role in this day's action was rewarded with the appendage of an oak leaf cluster to his Silver Star.

Col. Etheredge subsequently commanded Company "K" in France; there, on August 16, 1944, he once again exposed himself to gunfire in the course of significantly assisting the American advance; he was sitting atop a tank destroyer, directing its fire at German‑held buildings 200 yards distant, when he barely escaped a machine‑gun fusillade; a platoon flanking the building then fell into disarray and Col. Etheredge dashed across 75 yards of open ground through more machine‑gun fire to reorganize the group; choosing a route that skirted the barbed wire outside the buildings, he next led a 50‑yard assault that captured 29 enemy soldiers, an anti‑tank gun, a mortar, large quantities of ammunition, and numerous vehicles; in recognition of his bravery and decisive command, he received a second oak leaf cluster.

During the war Col. Etheredge also received two Bronze Stars and two Purple Hearts; he was eventually discharged with the highest efficiency rating of any officer discharged from the Fourth Army; this dauntless soldier later served three terms in the Texas Legislature and taught for 33 years at Sam Houston State University.

== Texas Legislator ==

Etheredge represented San Jacinto and Walker Counties in the Texas House of Representatives from January 14, 1947, to August 29, 1951. Under his leadership as chairman of the House Education Committee the Gilmer-Aiken bills were passed.

== Educator ==
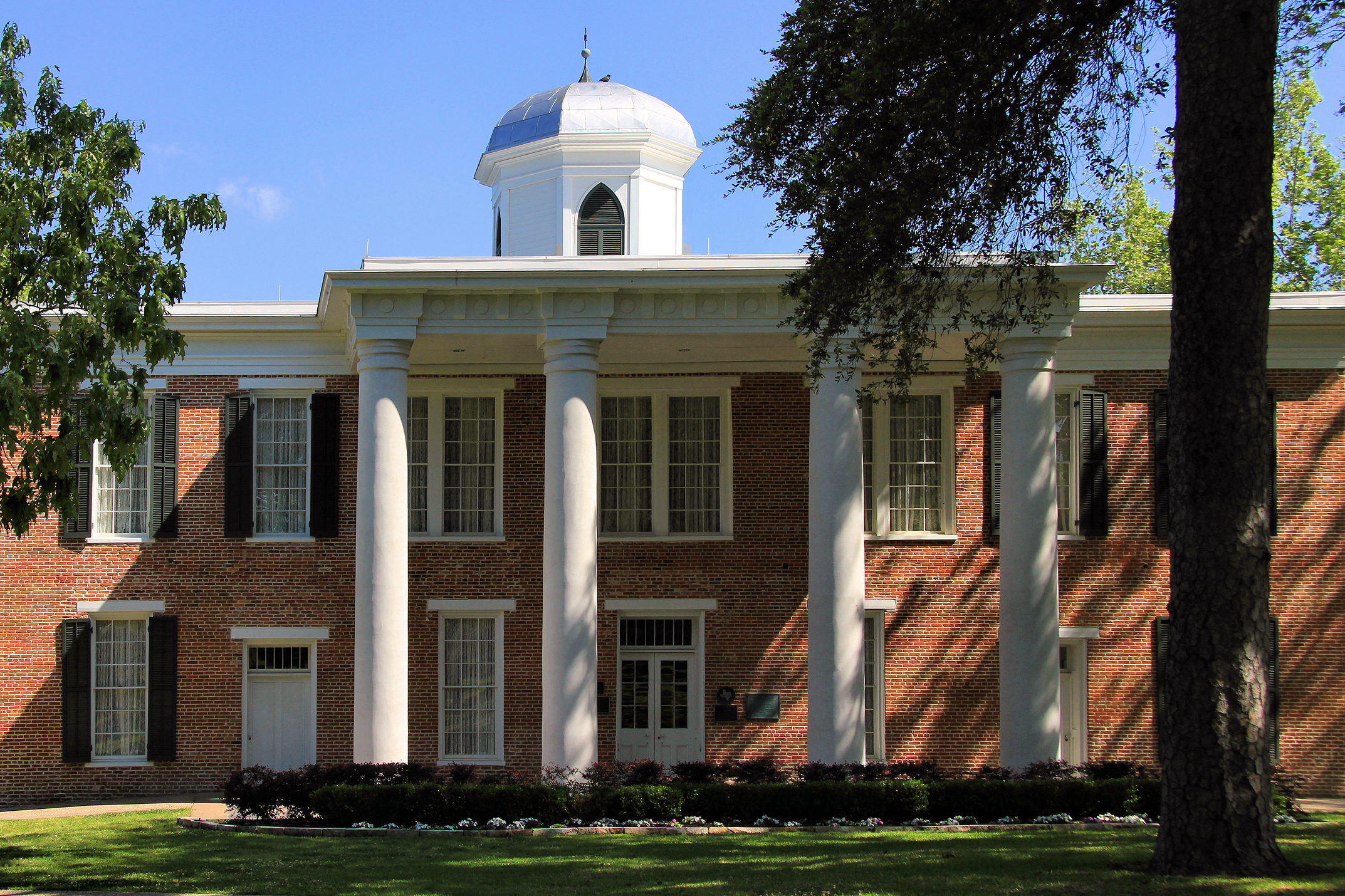
Austin Hall at Sam Houston State University

Colonel Etheredge returned to the classroom in 1951 to teach at his alma mater, Sam Houston State University, as a professor in the education department. He also founded the Army ROTC program, became a member of the university's athletic hall of honor, retired as a full professor in 1978 and was later recognized as a distinguished alumnus of the school.

== Personal life ==
M B married Emma Fatheree of Stockdale and had one daughter, Virginia Lee. M B was a civic leader in Huntsville, Texas, where he served two terms as a board member of the Huntsville Chamber of Commerce and as president of the Huntsville Rotary Club. He was also a 75-year Mason, Forrest Lodge #19 A.F. & A.M.

Texas House of Representatives
| Preceded by A W Coker | Texas State Representative from District 29 (San Jacinto and Walker counties); 1947–1951 | Succeeded by Robert C. Stiernberg |
