= Quentin P. Smith =

Tuskegee Airman and civilian educator (1919–2013)

First Lieutenant Quentin P. Smith
- Born: 1919; Weldon, Texas
- Died: January 15, 2013
- Military career
- Allegiance: American
- Branch: Army Air Forces

Quentin P. Smith (1919–2013) was an American airman who served as a B-25 bombardier with the Tuskegee Airmen during World War II.

== Early life ==
Smith was born in Weldon, Texas. His father moved to East Chicago, Indiana to look for a job. Smith, along with the rest of his family, joined him there a few years later. He attended Washington High School, where his focus was on music rather than athletics. He graduated from Indiana State Teachers College with a degree in social studies education

== Tuskegee ==
Smith did not yearn to fly like the rest of his colleagues. In fact, he once said, "I didn't give a tinker's damn if I ever left the ground." His friend Cornelius Coffey founded the Coffey School of Aeronautics in Chicago, and Smith had to be talked into joining.

At the time, military planes were assigned to White pilots. Smith flew "primary" planes known as service aircraft. He served as a flight instructor for "primaries" at the Tuskegee Institute. Smith weighed 200 pounds and was too big for a P-40 or P-51. Instead he was made a bombardier.

Smith was a member of the Tuskegee Airmen 477th Composite Group.

First Lieutenant Smith spent time at Fort Knox near Louisville. He was transferred to Freeman Field in Indiana. Since Smith was an officer he was technically allowed to enter any officers club, but the military was still segregated. Black officers were prohibited from the officers club, tennis court, and swimming pool. They were only allowed to use the facilities during hours when they were supposed to be working. Along with 100 officers, Smith refused to sign a new directive about segregation in officers clubs. They were sent to prison at Fort Leavenworth. Shortly after, they were sent back to Freeman Field because there was not enough room for 101 black prisoners at Fort Leavenworth. Thurgood Marshall defended the men and won their release. Smith received an honorable discharge on an order from then President Harry Truman More than fifty years later, Smith and the 100 other black officers' service records would be formally cleared of the incident.

In 2007, as a member of the Tuskegee Airmen, First Lieutenant Smith received a Congressional Gold Medal. This is the highest civilian honor bestowed by the United States Congress. It was stolen during a break-in, but was replaced at a special ceremony in 2012.

== Educational career ==
Smith earned his master's degree in English. He took on various roles in schools. He taught English at Roosevelt High School, served as a guidance counselor, and then went on to become a high school principal at West Side High School in Indiana. Later in his life he was made the director of secondary education for Gary, Indiana. He sat on several aviation and education boards, and was a member of the Chicago Chapter of Tuskegee Airmen, an organization of black pilots. Smith also created the Gary Emerson High School for Visual and Performing Arts.

== Death ==
Dr. Quentin P. Smith died on January 15, 2013. He was 94 years old. After his passing, an airport bridge at the Gary/Chicago International Airport was named in his honor. Smith was a former president of the Gary Airport Authority.

== External links and further reading ==
- Mayor presents Tuskegee Airman Quentin P. Smith with Replica Medal, Key to City and Pin
- OTA Quentin P. Smith, PHD
- Transcript of Interview with Quentin Smith, Undated
- Tuskegee Airmen Respected on Two Fronts
- Warren, Lt. Col. James C (1995). The Tuskegee Airmen Mutiny at Freeman Field. Vacaville: Conyers. ISBN 978-0966081800.
