= Kingston, Texas =

- Unincorporated community
- Location within Texas Location within the United States
- Coordinates: 33°15′10″N 96°10′36″W
- Country: United States
- State: Texas
- County: Hunt
- Elevation: 633 ft (193 m)

Population
  - Estimate: 140
- Time zone: UTC-6 (Central)
  - Summer (DST): UTC-5 (Central)
- Area codes: 903, 430
- GNIS feature ID: 1374385

Kingston is an unincorporated community located in Hunt County, Texas, United States. Kingston is probably best known as the birthplace of Audie Murphy.

== Location ==
Kingston is located 10 miles north of Greenville on U.S. Route 69, three miles south of Celeste.

== History ==
The community originated in 1880 as a depot on the Missouri, Kansas and Texas Railroad when tracks were extended from Denison to Greenville. In return for donated land, the railroad granted to Nick Hodges the naming rights. He selected "Kingston" in honor of the location where his Confederate unit had surrendered. The population increase was so rapid that before the end of 1880 the community had a post office. A newspaper named the Kingston Beacon was begun two years later. At the very end of the century, a college was located in town. By 1890, the population had reached 600 individuals and boasted several commercial and social establishments, but it began to decline after the town refused to give a bonus to the Gulf, Colorado and Santa Fe Railway in order to bring that rail line through the town. By 1914, the population had halved. The post office was shut down in 1930. By 1947 the population had halved again, bringing down the total to 150. In 2000, the population of Kingston was 140.
