= Audie L. Murphy Memorial VA Hospital =

Coordinates: 29°30′29″N 98°34′50″W

- Veterans Health Administration
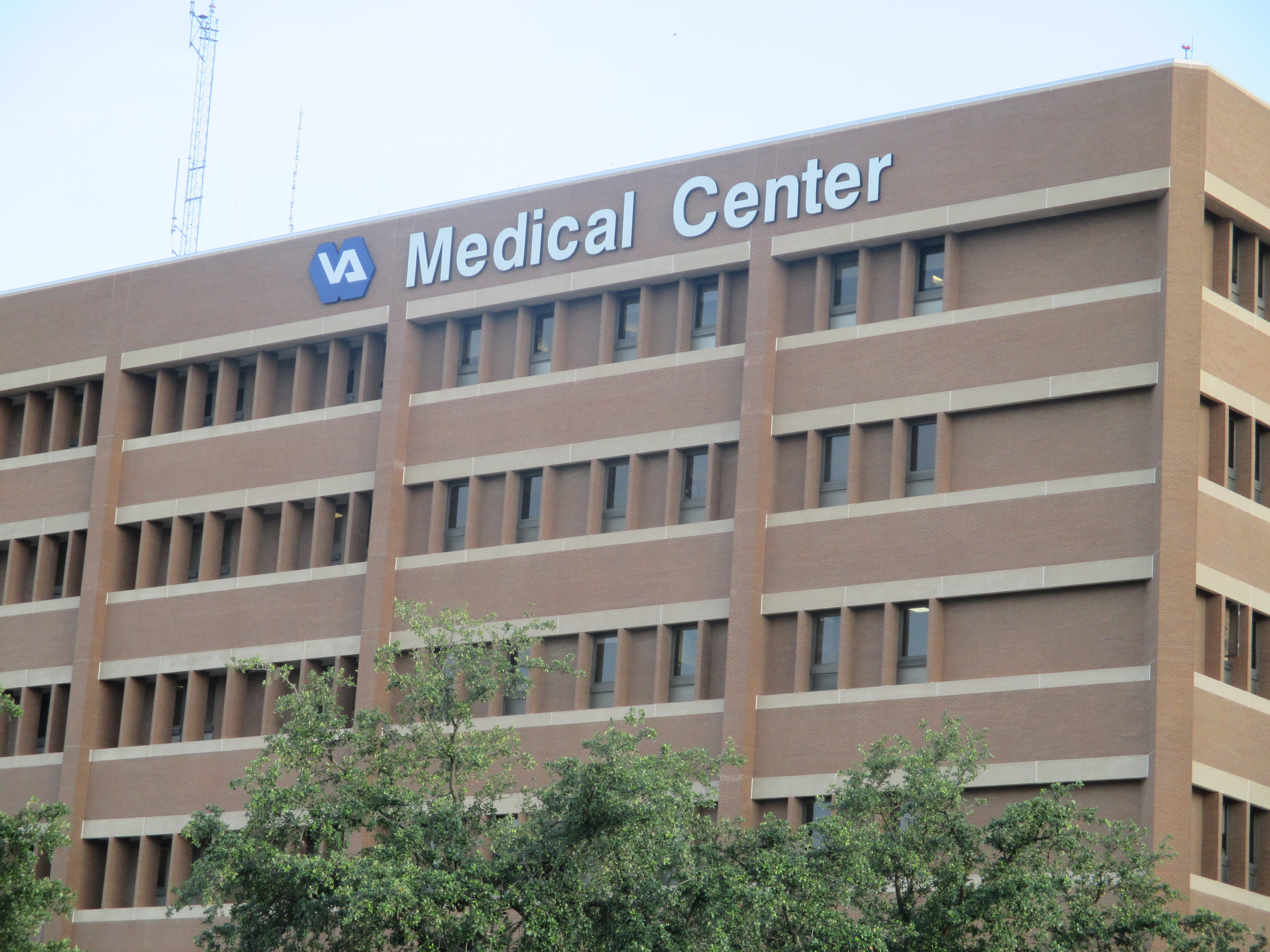

Geography
- Location: 7400 Merton Minter Blvd, San Antonio, Texas, United States

Organization
- Care system: Veterans' Affairs
- Type: Quaternary services and Level II Research facility
- Affiliated university: University of Texas Health Science Center at San Antonio

Services
- Emergency department: Comprehensive emergency center
- Beds: 462

History
- Founded: 1973

Links
- Website: Audie L. Murphy Memorial VA Hospital
- Lists: Hospitals in Texas

Audie L. Murphy Memorial VA Hospital (STVHCS) is a care facility affiliated with the University of Texas Health Science Center at San Antonio in Bexar County, in the U.S. state of Texas. It is operated by the United States Department of Veterans Affairs.

The hospital is named for Medal of Honor recipient and Texas native son Audie Murphy, who died in a plane crash on May 28, 1971. That same year, U.S. Congressman Olin Teague introduced legislation to name a planned Veterans Administration medical facility in San Antonio for Murphy. The facility was dedicated November 17, 1973.
