= Audie Murphy =

American soldier and actor (1925–1971)

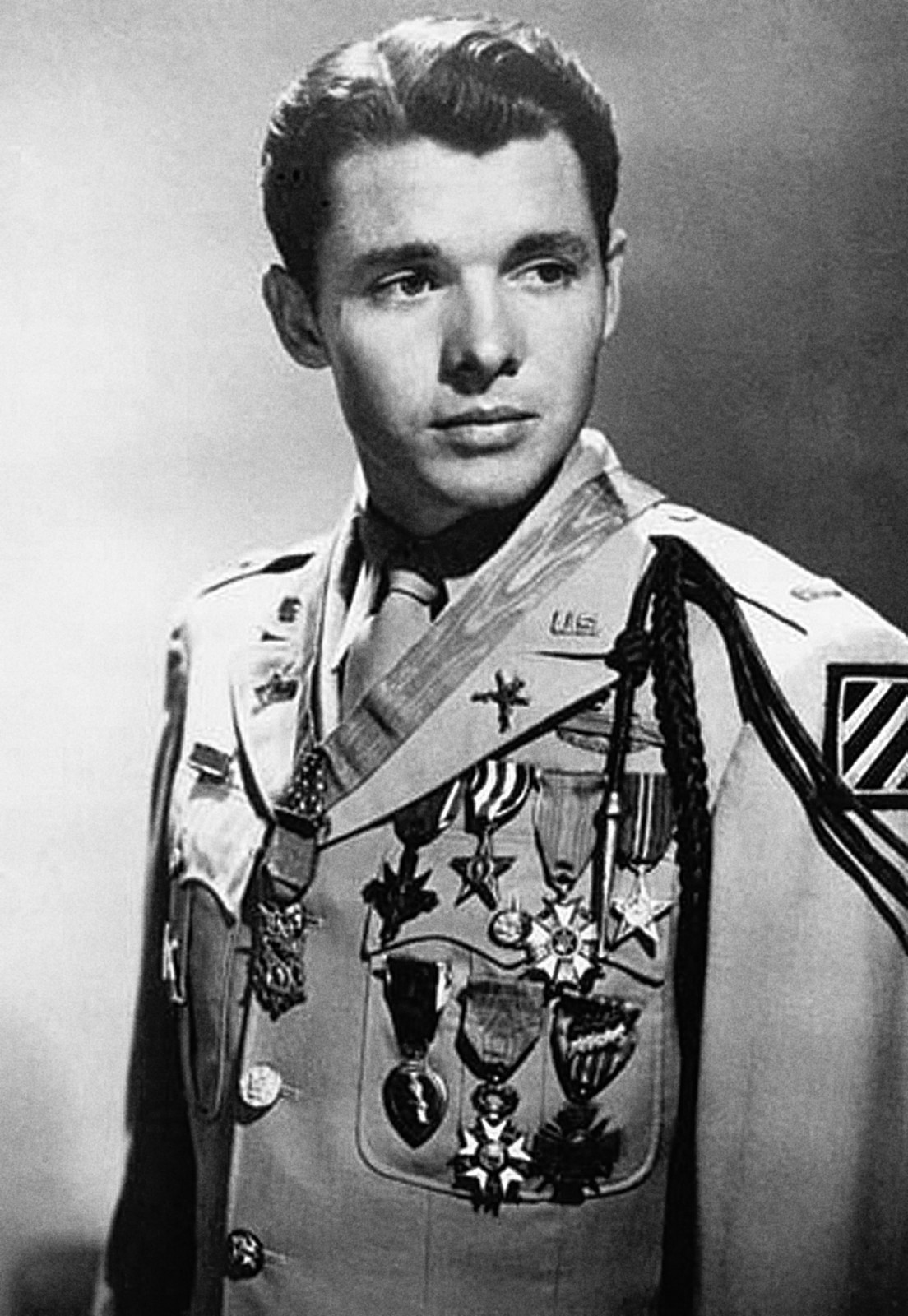
- Murphy in uniform, 1948
- Born: June 20, 1925 (Note: Murphy's son Terry is the President of the Audie Murphy Research Foundation, which in both its biographical sketch and Murphy Family Tree list his year of birth as 1925. The Foundation states that Murphy "admitted, on more than one occasion, that he lied about his age." Murphy's date of birth has been given as both 1924 and 1925 by Murphy himself. He seemed to go back and forth on the dates for the rest of his life. His sister, Mrs. Corinne Burns, as his nearest living kin, had signed a notarized document attesting to the birth date of 20 June 1924 that Murphy put on his enlistment application, falsifying his year of birth so he could meet the U.S. Army age qualification for enlistment. Subsequently, all military records show the purportedly falsified date as his birth date. His California driver's license showed a birth date of 1925.); Kingston, Texas, U.S.
- Died: May 28, 1971 (aged 45); 14 nautical miles northwest of Roanoke, Virginia, U.S. (Note: Sources differ on the location of the plane crash. The National Transportation Safety Board press release identifies the crash site as Brushy Mountain, as does the wrongful death lawsuit filed by Murphy's widow and sons. Other sources state that the crash site was on Brush Mountain, which is where the Veterans of Foreign Wars memorial to Murphy has been established.)
- Burial place: Arlington National Cemetery
- Spouses: Wanda Hendrix (m. 1949; div. 1951) Pamela Opal Lee Archer (m. 1951)
- Children: 2
- Military career
- Allegiance: United States
- Branch: United States Army; Texas Army National Guard; United States Army Reserve
- Service years: 1942–1945 (active); 1950–1966 (National Guard); 1966–1969 (reserve)
- Rank: First lieutenant (active); Major (National Guard)
- Service number: 18083707 (enlisted); O-1692509 (officer)
- Units: 15th Infantry Regiment; 3rd Infantry Division; 36th Infantry Division
- Conflicts: World War II; Tunisia; Sicily; Naples-Foggia; Anzio; Rome-Arno; Southern France; Ardennes-Alsace; Rhineland; Central Europe
- Awards: Medal of Honor; Distinguished Service Cross; Silver Star (2); Legion of Merit; Bronze Star Medal (2, 1 "V" device); Purple Heart (3); Legion of Honour (France); Croix de Guerre with silver star (France); Croix de Guerre with palm (3, France); Croix de Guerre with palm (Belgium); Outstanding Civilian Service Medal; Texas Legislative Medal of Honor
- Other work: Actor; songwriter; rancher
- Website: audiemurphy.com

Audie Leon Murphy (June 20, 1925 – May 28, 1971) was an American soldier, actor, and songwriter. He was widely celebrated as the most decorated American combat soldier of World War II, and has been described as the most highly decorated enlisted soldier in U.S. history. He received every military combat award for valor available from the United States Army, as well as French and Belgian awards for heroism. Murphy received the Medal of Honor for valor that he demonstrated at age 19 for single-handedly holding off a company of German soldiers for an hour at the Colmar Pocket in France in January 1945, before leading a successful counterattack while wounded.

Murphy was born into a large family of sharecroppers in Hunt County, Texas. His father abandoned the family and his mother died when Murphy was a teenager. Murphy left school in fifth grade to pick cotton and find other work to help support his family; his skill with a hunting rifle helped feed his family. After the attack on Pearl Harbor in 1941, Murphy's older sister helped him to falsify documentation about his birthdate to meet the minimum age for enlisting in the military. Turned down initially for being underweight by the Army, Navy, and the Marine Corps, he eventually was able to enlist in the Army. He first saw action in the 1943 Allied invasion of Sicily; then in 1944 he participated in the Battle of Anzio, the liberation of Rome, and the invasion of southern France. Murphy fought at Montélimar and led his men on a successful assault at L'Omet quarry near Cleurie in northeastern France in October. Despite suffering from multiple illnesses and wounds throughout his service, Murphy became one of the most praised and decorated soldiers of World War II. He is credited with killing 241 enemy soldiers.

After the war, Murphy embarked on an acting career. He played himself in the 1955 autobiographical film To Hell and Back, based on his 1949 memoirs of the same name, but most of his roles were in Westerns. He made guest appearances on celebrity television shows and starred in the series Whispering Smith. Murphy was a fairly accomplished songwriter. He bred quarter horses, and became a regular participant in horse racing.

Because Murphy had what would today be described as post-traumatic stress disorder (PTSD), then known as "battle fatigue", he slept with a loaded handgun under his pillow. He looked for solace in addictive sleeping pills. In his last few years, he was plagued by money problems but refused offers to appear in alcohol and cigarette commercials because he did not want to set a bad example. Murphy died in a plane crash in Virginia in 1971, shortly before his 46th birthday. He was interred with military honors at Arlington National Cemetery.

== Early life ==
Murphy was born in Kingston, a small rural community in Hunt County in northeastern Texas. He was the seventh of twelve children born to Emmett Berry Murphy and his wife Josie Bell Murphy (née Killian). The Murphys were sharecroppers, of English, Irish, Scots-Irish, Scottish, and German descent. Although Murphy's birth date is listed as 1924 in his enlistment papers, his biographer David A. Smith concluded that he was born in 1925, based on statements made by his To Hell and Back co-author David McClure, his California driver's license, and by Murphy himself.

As a child, Murphy was a loner with mood swings and an explosive temper. He grew up in northeastern Texas around the towns of Farmersville, Greenville, and Celeste, where he attended elementary school. His father drifted in and out of the family's life and eventually deserted them. Murphy dropped out of school in fifth grade and got a job picking cotton for a dollar a day (equivalent to $23 in 2025) to help support his family; he also became skilled with a rifle, hunting small game to help feed them. After his mother died of endocarditis and pneumonia in 1941, he worked at a radio repair shop and at a combination general store, garage and gas station in Greenville. Hunt County authorities placed his three youngest siblings in Boles Children's Home, a Christian orphanage in Quinlan. After the war, he bought a house in Farmersville for his eldest sister and her husband. His other siblings briefly shared the home.

The loss of his mother stayed with Murphy throughout his life. He later stated:

She died when I was sixteen. She had the most beautiful hair I've ever seen. It reached almost to the floor. She rarely talked; and always seemed to be searching for something. What it was I don't know. We didn't discuss our feelings. But when she passed away, she took something of me with her. It seems I've been searching for it ever since.

== World War II service ==
=== Enlistment and basic training ===
After the Japanese attack on Pearl Harbor in December 1941, he attempted to enlist in the U.S. military, but the Army, Navy, and Marine Corps all turned him down for being underweight and underage. After his sister provided an affidavit that falsified his birth date by a year, he was accepted by the U.S. Army on 30 June 1942. (Note: Conflicting information exists as to Murphy's date and place of enlistment. The Audie L. Murphy Memorial website has scanned documents from the U.S. National Archives and Records Administration that include Corinne Burns' statement and Murphy's "Induction Record", which shows him "Enlisted at Dallas, Texas" on 30 June 1942, and the line above it says "Accepted for service at Greenville, Texas". The National Register of Historic Places Listing added the Greenville post office as historic site number 74002081 in 1974, citing it as Murphy's place of enlistment, possibly referring to the act the military termed "Accepted for service". The NRHP also shows his enlistment date as 20 June 1942 which might be the date he was accepted for service.) According to his biographer David A. Smith, Murphy acknowledged his birth date was falsified at his enlistment in a 1950 interview with the Austin Statesman: "'The doctor back home couldn't remember exactly when I was born,' he said with a smile, 'so I was 18.'"

After basic training at Camp Wolters, he was sent to Fort Meade for advanced infantry training. During basic training, he earned the Marksman Badge with Rifle Component Bar and Expert Badge with Bayonet Component Bar.

=== Mediterranean Theater ===
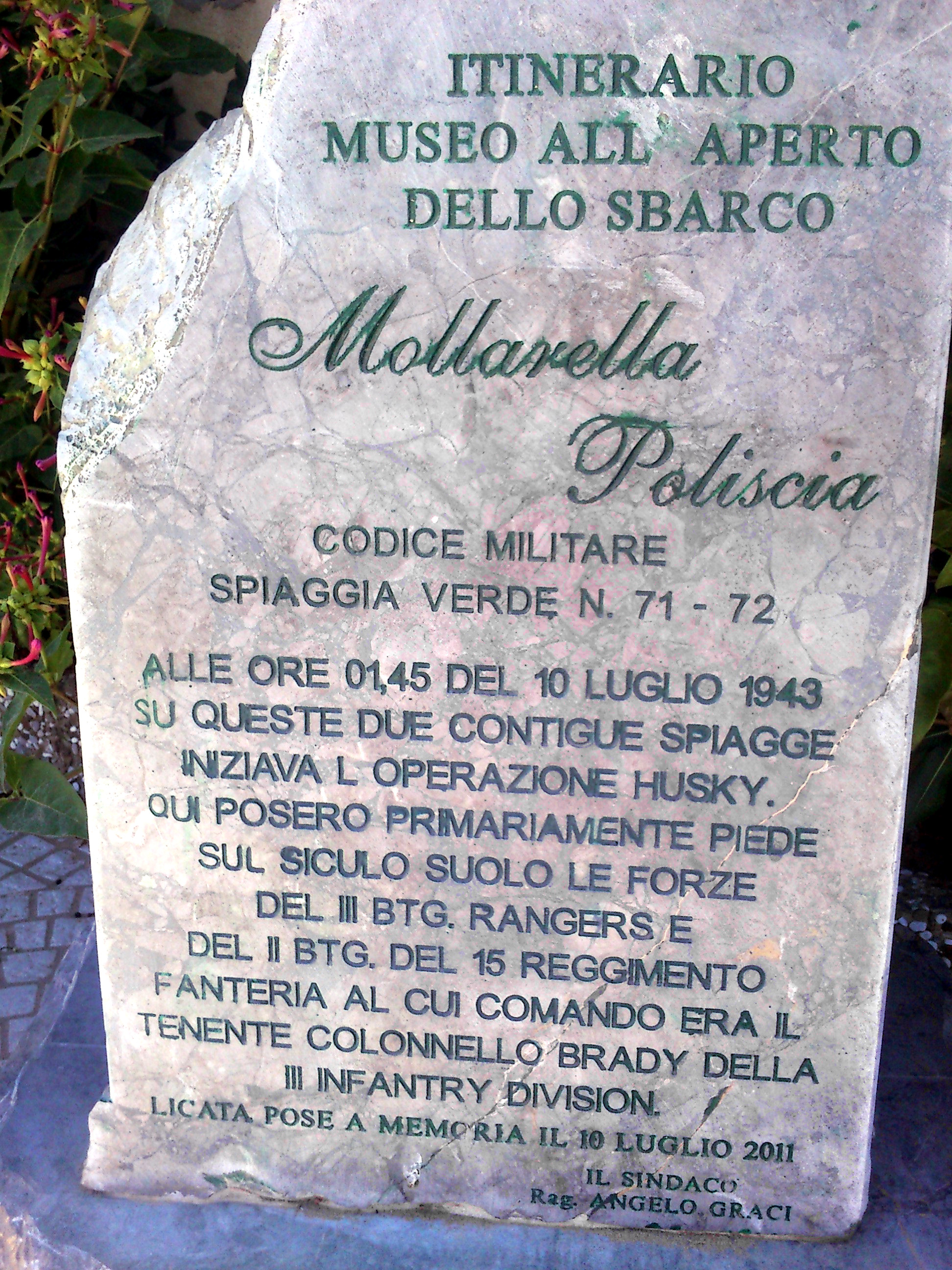
Allied landing in Sicily, Licata Sector Joss Beach Mollarella Poliscia, Marker erected 10 July 2011

Murphy was shipped to Casablanca in French Morocco on 20 February 1943. He was assigned to Company B, 1st Battalion, 15th Infantry Regiment, 3rd Infantry Division, which trained under the command of Major General Lucian Truscott. After the 13 May surrender of the Axis forces in French Tunisia, the division was put in charge of the prisoners. He participated as a platoon messenger with his division at Arzew in Algeria in rigorous training for the Allied assault landings in Sicily. Murphy was promoted to private first class on 7 May and corporal on 15 July.

When the 3rd Infantry landed at Licata, Sicily, on 10 July, Murphy was a division runner. On a scouting patrol, he killed two fleeing Italian officers near Canicattì. Sidelined with illness for a week when Company B arrived in Palermo on 20 July, he rejoined them when they were assigned to a hillside location protecting a machine-gun emplacement, while the rest of the 3rd Infantry Division fought at San Fratello en route to the Allied capture of the transit port of Messina.

Murphy participated in Operation Avalanche, the September 1943 mainland Salerno landing at Battipaglia. While on a scouting party along the Volturno river, he and two other soldiers were ambushed; German machine gun fire killed one soldier. Murphy and the other survivor responded by killing five Germans with hand grenades and machine gun fire. While taking part in the October Allied assault on the Volturno Line, near Mignano Monte Lungo Hill 193, he and his company repelled an attack by seven German soldiers, killing three and taking four prisoner. Murphy was promoted to sergeant on 13 December.

In January 1944, Murphy was promoted to staff sergeant. He was hospitalized in Naples with malaria on 21 January and was unable to participate in the initial landing at the Anzio beachhead. He returned on 29 January and participated in the First Battle of Cisterna, and was made a platoon sergeant in Company B following the battle. He returned with the 3rd Division to Anzio, where they remained for four months. Taking shelter from the weather in an abandoned farmhouse on 2 March, Murphy and his platoon killed the crew of a passing German tank. He then crawled out alone close enough to destroy the tank with rifle grenades, for which he received the Bronze Star with "V" device.

Murphy continued to make scouting patrols to take German prisoners before being hospitalized for a week on 13 March with a second bout of malaria. Sixty-one infantry officers and enlisted men of Company B, 15th Infantry, including Murphy, were awarded the Combat Infantryman Badge on 8 May.

Murphy was awarded a Bronze Oak Leaf Cluster for his Bronze Star. American forces liberated Rome on 4 June, and Murphy remained bivouacked in Rome with his platoon throughout July.

=== European Theater ===
During the first wave of the Allied invasion of southern France, Murphy received the Distinguished Service Cross for action taken on 15 August 1944. After landing on Yellow Beach near Ramatuelle, Murphy's platoon was making its way through a vineyard when the men were attacked by German soldiers. He retrieved a machine gun that had been detached from the squad and returned fire at the German soldiers, killing two and wounding one. Two Germans exited a house about 100 yards (91 m) away and appeared to surrender; when Murphy's best friend responded, they shot and killed him. Murphy advanced alone on the house under direct fire. He killed six, wounded two and took 11 prisoners.

Murphy was with the 1st Battalion, 15th Infantry Regiment during the 27–28 August offensive at Montélimar that secured the area from the Germans. Along with the other soldiers who took part in the action, he received the Presidential Unit Citation.

Murphy's first Purple Heart was for a heel wound received in a mortar shell blast on 15 September 1944 in northeastern France. His first Silver Star came after he killed four and wounded three at a German machine gun position on 2 October at L'Omet quarry in the Cleurie valley. Three days later, Murphy crawled alone towards the Germans at L'Omet, carrying an SCR-536 radio and directing his men for an hour while the Germans fired directly at him. When his men finally took the hill, 15 Germans had been killed and 35 wounded. Murphy's actions earned him a Bronze Oak Leaf Cluster for his Silver Star. He was awarded a battlefield commission to second lieutenant on 14 October, which elevated him to platoon leader. While en route to Brouvelieures on 26 October, the 3rd Platoon of Company B was attacked by a German sniper group. Murphy captured two before being shot in the hip by a sniper; he returned fire and shot the sniper between the eyes. At the 3rd General Hospital at Aix-en-Provence, the removal of gangrene from the wound caused partial loss of his hip muscle and kept him out of combat until January. Murphy received his first Bronze Oak Leaf Cluster for his Purple Heart for this injury.

The Colmar Pocket, 850 square miles (2,200 km^{2}) in the Vosges Mountains, had been held by German troops since November 1944. On 14 January 1945, Murphy rejoined his platoon, which had been moved to the Colmar area in December. He moved with the 3rd Division on 24 January to the town of Holtzwihr, where they faced a strong German counterattack. He was wounded in both legs, for which he received a second Bronze Oak Leaf Cluster for his Purple Heart. As the company awaited reinforcements on 26 January, he was made commander of Company B. At about 2 pm that afternoon, German troops and tanks counterattacked and Murphy ordered his company to withdraw into prepared positions. The Germans scored a direct hit on an M10 tank destroyer which was stationed near Murphy's company command post, setting it alight and forcing the crew to abandon it. Murphy remained alone at his post, shooting his M1 carbine and directing artillery fire via his field radio, while the Germans aimed fire directly at his position. Murphy mounted the abandoned, burning tank destroyer and began firing its .50 caliber machine gun at the advancing Germans, killing a squad crawling through a ditch towards him. For an hour, Murphy stood on the flaming tank destroyer, returning German fire from foot soldiers and advancing tanks, and killing or wounding 50 Germans. He sustained a leg wound during his stand, and stopped only after he ran out of ammunition. Murphy rejoined his men, disregarding his own injury, and led them back to repel the Germans. Murphy insisted on remaining with his men while his wounds were treated.

For his actions that day, Murphy was awarded the Medal of Honor. The 3rd Infantry Division was awarded the Presidential Unit Citation for its actions at the Colmar Pocket, giving Murphy a Bronze Oak Leaf Cluster for the emblem.

On 16 February, Murphy was promoted to first lieutenant and was awarded the Legion of Merit for his service from 22 January 1944 to 18 February 1945. He was moved from the front lines to Regimental Headquarters and made a liaison officer.

=== Decorations ===
Army version of the Medal of Honor

The United States additionally honored Murphy's war contributions with the American Campaign Medal, the European–African–Middle Eastern Campaign Medal with arrowhead device and 9 campaign stars, the World War II Victory Medal, and the Army of Occupation Medal with Germany Clasp. France recognized his service with the French Legion of Honor – Grade of Chevalier, the French Croix de guerre with Silver Star, the French Croix de guerre with Palm, the French Liberation Medal and the French Fourragère in Colors of the Croix de guerre, which was authorized for all members of the 3rd Infantry Division who fought in France during World War II. Belgium awarded Murphy the Belgian Croix de guerre with 1940 Palm.

Brigadier General Ralph B. Lovett and Lieutenant Colonel Hallet D. Edson recommended Murphy for the Medal of Honor. Near Salzburg, Austria, on 2 June 1945, Lieutenant General A.M. Patch presented Murphy with the Medal of Honor and Legion of Merit for his actions at Holtzwihr. When asked after the war why he had seized the machine gun and taken on an entire company of German infantry, he replied, "They were killing my friends".

Murphy received every U.S. military combat award for valor available from the U.S. Army for his World War II service. (Note: Murphy's war service was combat-related. Therefore, he did not receive the non-combat Soldier's Medal. Act of Congress (Public Law 446–69th Congress, 2 July 1926 (44 Stat. 780) established the Soldier's Medal for heroism "as defined in 10 USC 101(d), at the time of the heroic act who distinguished himself or herself by heroism not involving actual combat with the enemy.") At the end of his World War II service, Murphy became known as America's most decorated soldier.)

=== Postwar military service ===
Inquiries were made through official channels about the prospect of Murphy attending West Point upon his return to the United States, but he never enrolled. According to author Don Graham, Murphy suggested the idea and then dropped it, possibly when he realized the extent of academic preparation needed to pass the entrance exam.

Murphy was one of several military personnel who received orders on 8 June 1945 to report to Fort Sam Houston in San Antonio, Texas, for temporary duty and reassignment. Upon arrival on 13 June, he was one of four assigned to Fort Sam Houston Army Ground & Services Redistribution Station and sent home for 30 days of recuperation, with permission to travel anywhere within the United States during that period. While on leave, Murphy was feted with parades, banquets, and speeches. He received a belated Good Conduct Medal on 21 August.

He was discharged with the rank of first lieutenant at a 50 percent disability classification on 21 September and transferred to the Officers' Reserve Corps. (Note: The Officers' Reserve Corps was originally one of several units of the United States Organized Reserve that also included the Enlisted Reserve Corps, Reserve Officers' Training Corps and the Civilian Conservation Corps. The Organized Reserve was restructured during the Korean War and renamed the United States Army Reserve. The new structure was divided into the Ready Reserve, Standby Reserve and Retired Reserve.)

=== Post-traumatic stress ===
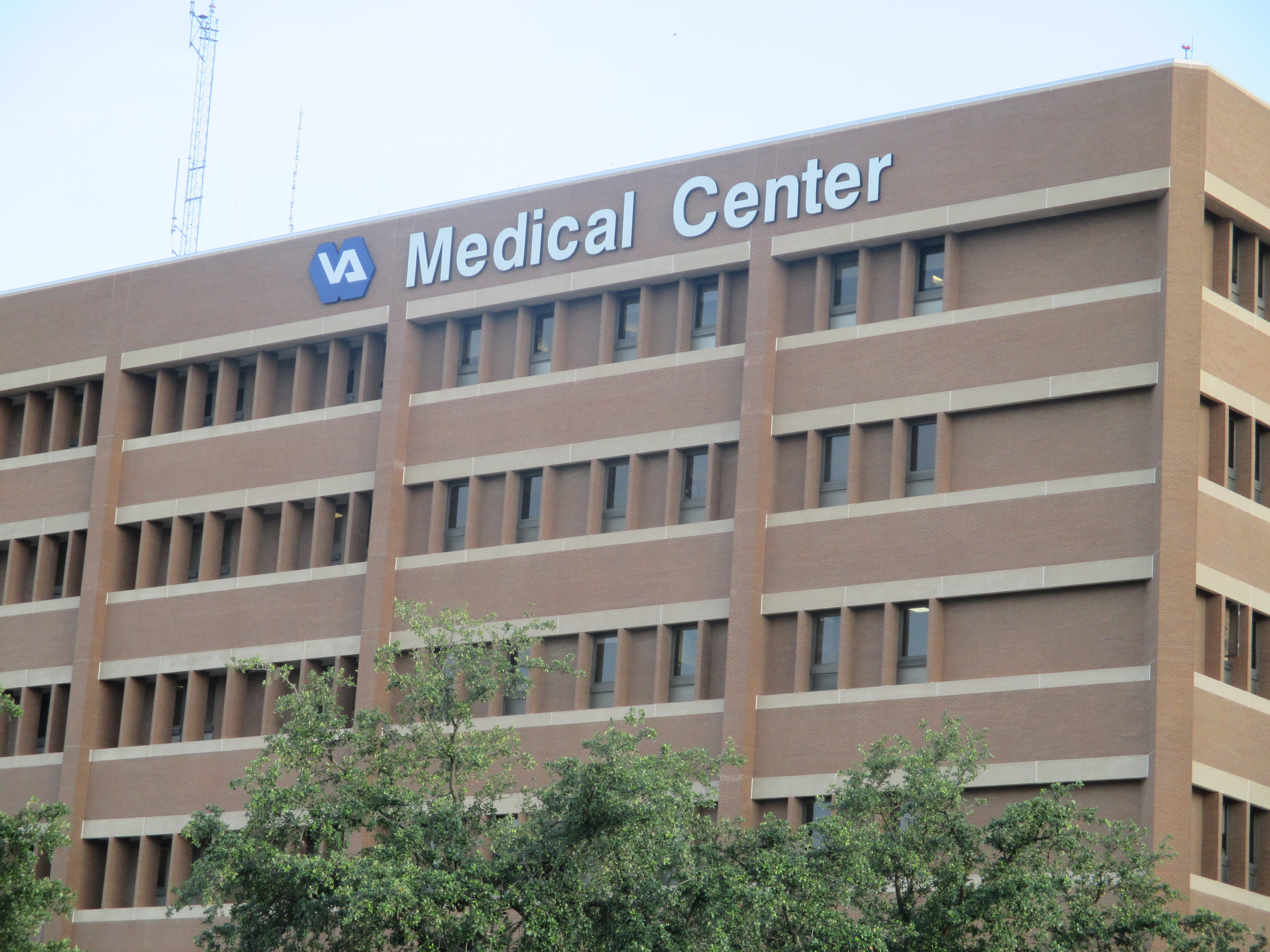
Audie L. Murphy Memorial VA Hospital in San Antonio, Texas

After his military service, Murphy was plagued with insomnia and bouts of depression, and he slept with a loaded pistol under his pillow. A post-service medical examination on 17 June 1947 revealed symptoms of headaches, vomiting, and nightmares about the war. His medical records indicated that he took sleeping pills to help prevent nightmares. During the mid-1960s, he recognized his dependence on the sedative Placidyl, and locked himself alone in a hotel room for a week to successfully break the addiction. Post-traumatic stress levels exacerbated his innate moodiness, and surfaced in episodes that friends and professional colleagues found alarming. His first wife, Dixie Wanda Hendrix, claimed he once held her at gunpoint. She witnessed her husband being guilt-ridden and tearful over newsreel footage of German war orphans. Murphy briefly found a creative stress outlet in writing poetry after his Army discharge. His poem "The Crosses Grow on Anzio" appeared in his book To Hell and Back, but was attributed to the fictitious character Kerrigan.

To draw attention to the problems of returning Korean War and Vietnam War veterans, Murphy spoke out candidly about his own problems with post-traumatic stress disorder. It was known during Murphy's lifetime as "battle fatigue" and "shell shock", terminology that dated back to World War I. He called on the government to give increased consideration and study to the emotional impact of combat experiences, and to extend health care benefits to war veterans. As a result of legislation introduced by U.S. Congressman Olin Teague five months after Murphy's death in 1971, the Audie L. Murphy Memorial VA Hospital in San Antonio, now a part of the South Texas Veterans Health Care System, was dedicated in 1973.

== Texas Army National Guard ==
At the end of World War II, the 36th Infantry Division reverted to state control as part of the Texas Army National Guard, and Murphy's friends, Major General H. Miller Ainsworth and Brigadier General Carl L. Phinney, were the 36th's commander and deputy commander respectively. After the 25 June 1950 commencement of the Korean War, Murphy began a second military career and was commissioned as a captain in the 36th Infantry Division of the Texas Army National Guard. He drilled new recruits in the summer training camps, and granted the Guard permission to use his name and image in recruiting materials. Although he wanted to join the fighting and juggled training activities with his film career, the 36th Infantry Division was never sent to Korea.

At his request, he transferred to inactive status on 1 October 1951 because of his film commitments with MGM Studios, and returned to active status in 1955. Murphy was promoted to the rank of major by the Texas Army National Guard in 1956 and returned to inactive status in 1957. In 1969, his official separation from the Guard transferred him to the United States Army Reserve. He remained with the USAR until his transfer to the Retired Reserve later in 1969.

== Film career ==
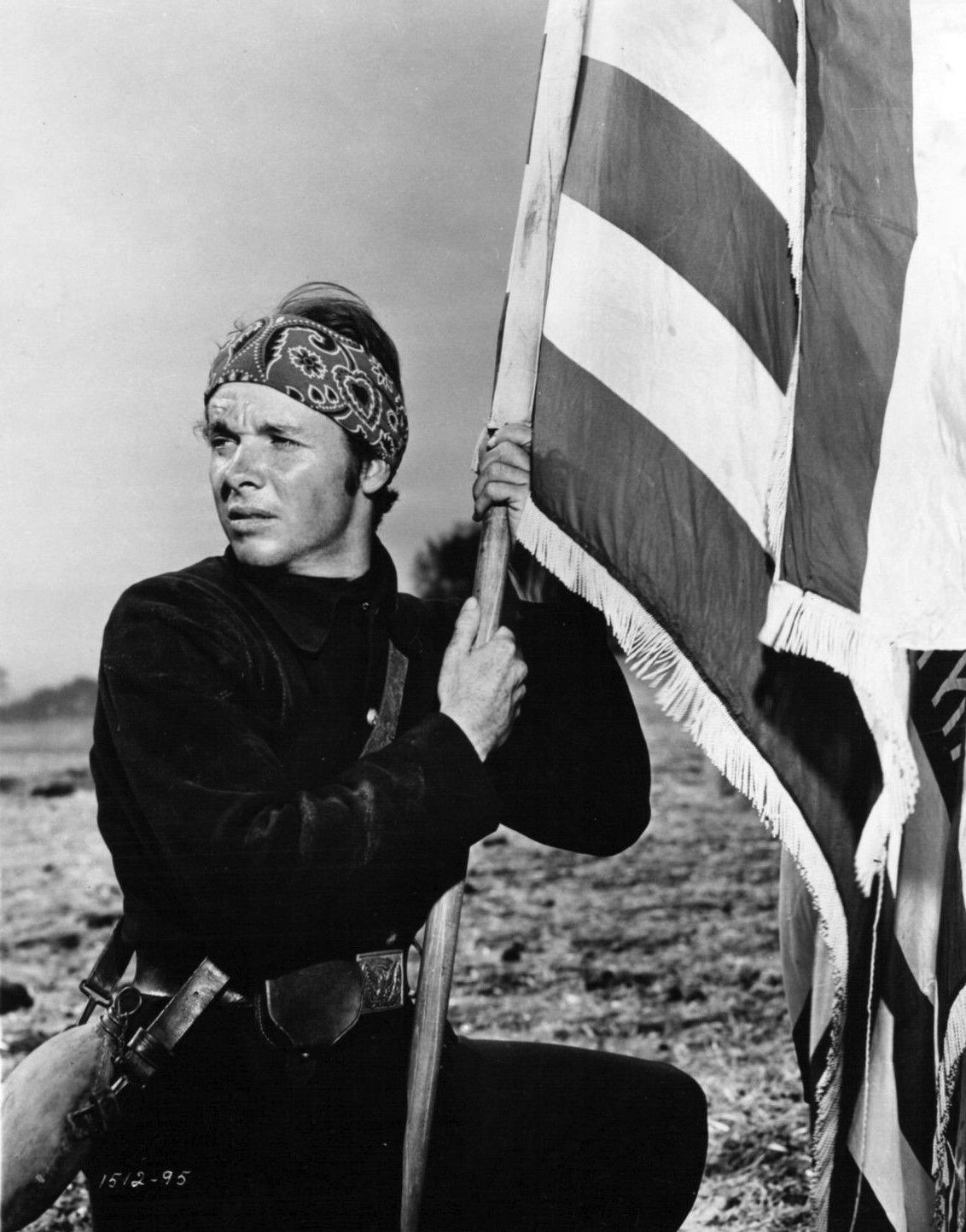
Murphy in The Red Badge of Courage (1951)

During an acting career spanning from 1948 to 1969, Murphy made more than 40 feature films and one television series. (Note: The exact count on the number of feature films Murphy made varies by source. The Hollywood Walk of Fame and other sources put his total number of feature films at 44.) When actor and producer James Cagney saw the 16 July 1945 issue of Life magazine depicting Murphy as the "most decorated soldier", he brought him to Hollywood. Cagney and his brother William signed him as a contract player for their production company and gave him training in acting, voice and dance. They never cast Murphy in a movie and a personal disagreement ended the association in 1947. Murphy later worked with acting coach Estelle Harman and honed his diction by reciting dialogue from William Shakespeare and William Saroyan.

Murphy moved into Terry Hunt's Athletic Club in Hollywood where he lived until 1948. Hollywood writer David "Spec" McClure befriended Murphy, collaborating with him on Murphy's 1949 book To Hell and Back. McClure used his connections to get a $500 (equivalent to $7,000 in 2025) bit part in Texas, Brooklyn & Heaven (1948) for Murphy. He had been dating actress Wanda Hendrix since 1946. Her talent agent got him a bit part in the Alan Ladd film Beyond Glory directed by John Farrow. His 1949 film Bad Boy gave him his first leading role. The film's financial backers refused to bankroll the project unless Murphy was given the lead; thus, Allied Artists put aside their reservations about using an inexperienced actor and gave him the starring role.

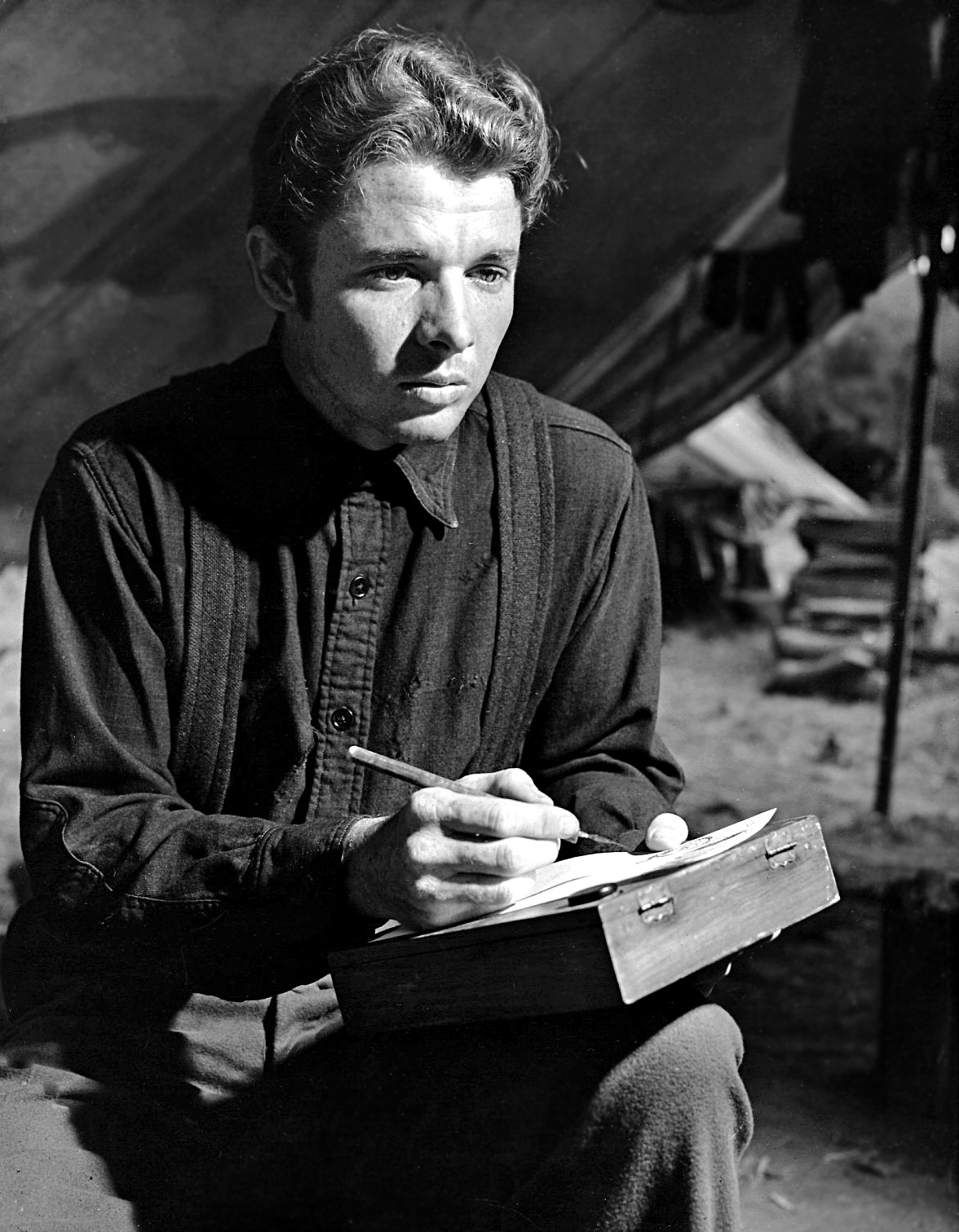
Murphy in The Red Badge of Courage

Universal Studios signed Murphy to a seven-year studio contract at $2,500 a week (equivalent to $33,500 in 2025). His first film for them was as Billy the Kid in The Kid from Texas in 1950. He wrapped up that year making Sierra starring Wanda Hendrix, who by that time had become his wife, and Kansas Raiders as outlaw Jesse James. Universal lent him to MGM in 1951 at a salary of $25,000 to play the lead of The Youth (Note: Henry Fleming is the Youth in Stephen Crane's novel. In the 1951 film, Fleming is played by Murphy as the unnamed character "The Youth". However, Fleming is addressed by name when other characters are speaking to him.) in The Red Badge of Courage, directed by John Huston. Murphy and Huston worked together again in the 1960 film The Unforgiven.

The only film Murphy made in 1952 was The Duel at Silver Creek with director Don Siegel. Murphy worked with Siegel one more time in 1958 for The Gun Runners. In 1953, he starred in Frederick de Cordova's Column South, and played Jim Harvey in Nathan Juran's Tumbleweed, an adaptation of the Kenneth Perkins novel Three Were Renegades. Director Nathan Juran also directed Gunsmoke and Drums Across the River. George Marshall directed Murphy in the 1954 Destry, a remake of Destry Rides Again, based on a character created by author Max Brand.

Although Murphy was initially reluctant to appear as himself in To Hell and Back, the 1955 adaptation of his book directed by Jesse Hibbs, he eventually agreed; it became the biggest hit in the history of Universal Studios at the time. To help publicize the release of the film, he made guest appearances on television shows such as What's My Line?, (Note: YouTube has several uploaded versions of the 5-minute What's My Line segment that features Murphy as the mystery guest. Listed as Episode dated 3 July 1955 at IMDb) Toast of the Town, and Colgate Comedy Hour. (Note: 56-minute uploaded on YouTube as Audie Murphy Attends Beverly Hilton Grand Opening 1955. He appears at 28:48 and briefly talks with Hedda Hopper about how he once gave his medals away but had them replaced by the U.S. Army.) The Hibbs-Murphy team proved so successful in To Hell and Back that the two worked together on five subsequent films. The partnership resulted in Murphy appearing as John Phillip Clum in the 1956 western Walk the Proud Land, and the non-westerns Joe Butterfly and World in My Corner. They worked together for the last time in the 1958 western Ride a Crooked Trail.

Joseph L. Mankiewicz hired Murphy to play the titular role (Note: Alden Pyle is the American in Graham Greene's novel. In the 1958 film, Pyle is played by Murphy as the unnamed character "The American") in the 1958 film The Quiet American. Murphy formed a partnership with Harry Joe Brown to make three films, starting with The Guns of Fort Petticoat (1957). The partnership fell into disagreement over the remaining two projects, and Brown filed suit against Murphy.

In 1957, Murphy played The Utica Kid alongside James Stewart and Dan Duryea in the western Night Passage.

Murphy was featured in three westerns in 1959: he starred opposite Sandra Dee in The Wild and the Innocent, collaborated as an uncredited co-producer with Walter Mirisch on the black and white Cast a Long Shadow, and performed as a hired killer in No Name on the Bullet, a film that was well received by critics. Thelma Ritter was his costar in the 1960 Startime television episode "The Man". During the early 1960s, Murphy donated his time and otherwise lent his name and image for three episodes of The Big Picture television series produced by the United States Army. He received the 1960 Outstanding Civilian Service Medal for his cooperation in the episode Broken Bridge, which featured his visits to military installations in Germany, Italy, Turkey and the U.S. state of New Mexico to showcase the military's latest weaponry.

Writer Clair Huffaker wrote the 1961 screenplays for Murphy's films Seven Ways from Sundown and Posse from Hell. Willard W. Willingham and his wife Mary Willingham befriended Murphy in his early days in Hollywood and worked with him on a number of projects.

Willard was a producer on Murphy's 1961 television series Whispering Smith, and co-wrote the screenplay for Battle at Bloody Beach that year. He collaborated on Bullet for a Badman in 1964 and Arizona Raiders in 1965. The Willinghams as a team wrote the screenplay for Gunpoint as well as the script for Murphy's last starring lead in the western 40 Guns to Apache Pass in 1967. Murphy made The Texican in Spain and Trunk to Cairo in Israel in 1965.

He first met director Budd Boetticher when Murphy requested to be his boxing partner at Terry Hunt's Athletic Club. He subsequently appeared in the 1951 title role of Boetticher's first western The Cimarron Kid. Boetticher wrote the script in 1969 for Murphy's last film, A Time for Dying. Two other projects that Murphy and Boetticher planned to collaborate on – A Horse for Mr Barnum and When There's Sumpthin' to Do – never came to fruition.

== Personal life ==
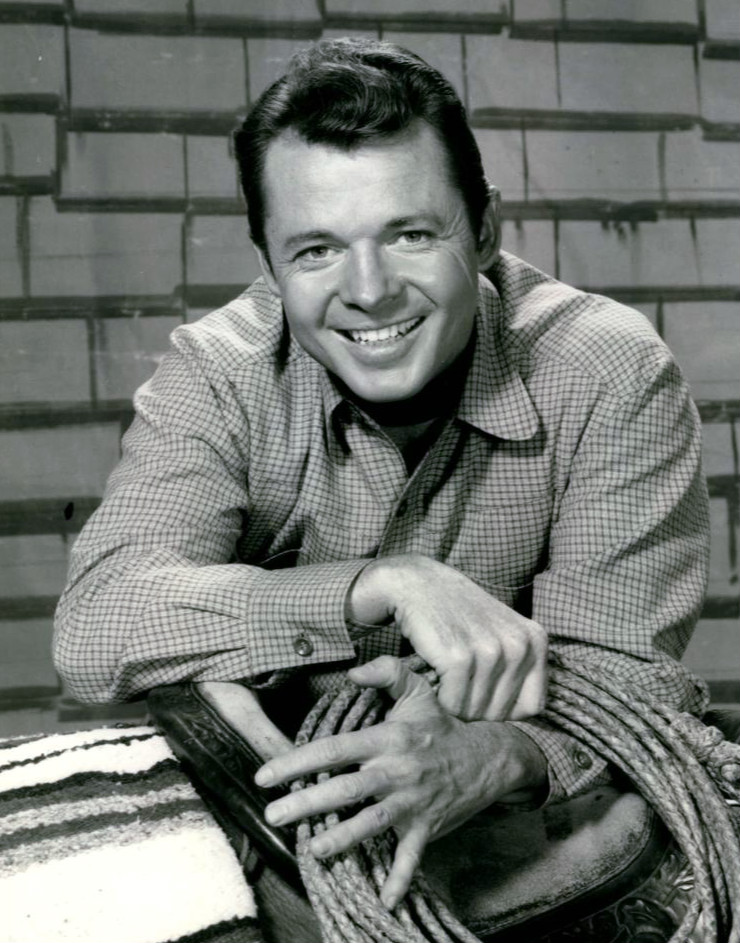
Murphy in 1961

Murphy married actress Wanda Hendrix in 1949. Their divorce became final two years later in 1951. Four days later, he married former airline stewardess Pamela Opal Lee Archer, with whom he had two sons.

Murphy bred quarter horses at the Audie Murphy Ranch in what is now Menifee, California, and the Murphy Ranch in Pima County, Arizona. (Note: The Audie L. Murphy Memorial Website has user-generated information on an Arizona quarter horse ranch Murphy purchased in 1956 and sold to Guy Mitchell in 1958. While not stating that the use of Murphy's name and image were authorized by his estate, the website of the Menifee residential development Audie Murphy Ranch claims it is the location of the ranch Murphy owned in California. Menifee was incorporated in 2008 and borders the community of Perris.)

His horses raced at the Del Mar Racetrack, and he invested large sums of money in the hobby. Murphy's gambling left his finances in a poor state. In 1968, he stated that he lost $260,000 in an Algerian oil deal and was dealing with the Internal Revenue Service over unpaid taxes. In spite of his financial difficulties, Murphy refused to appear in commercials for alcohol and cigarettes, mindful of the influence he would have on the youth market.

He was noted for a quick, fierce temper; he was involved in various violent altercations during his adult life. In May 1970, he was arrested in Burbank, California, charged with battery and assault with intent to commit murder in a dispute with a dog trainer. He was accused of firing a shot at the man, which he denied. Murphy was cleared of the charges.

== Death and commemorations ==
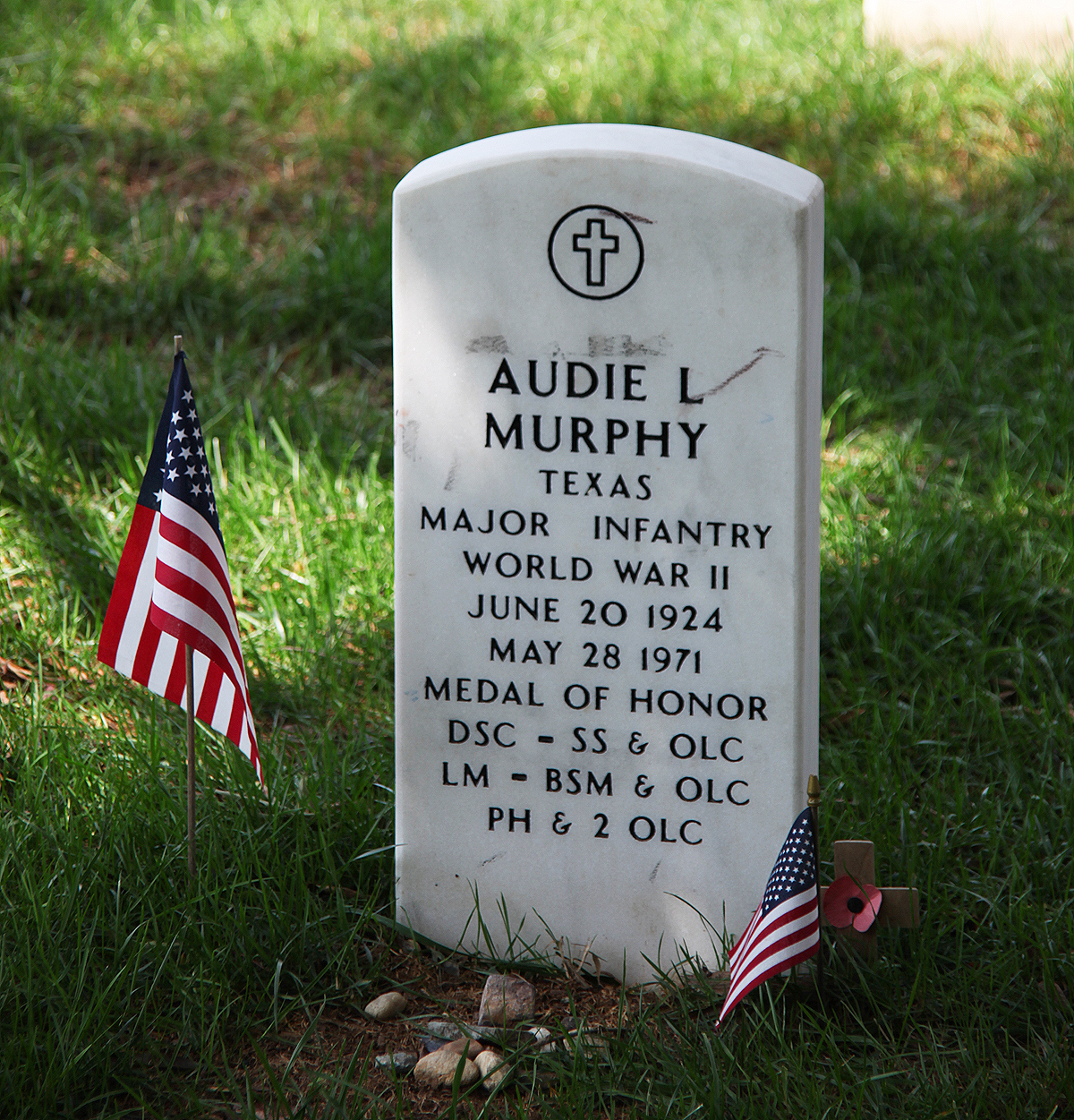
Murphy's headstone with incorrect 1924 date of birth at Arlington National Cemetery in Arlington County, Virginia

On 28 May 1971, Murphy was killed when the private plane in which he was a passenger crashed into the side of a mountain 14 nautical miles (16 mi; 26 km) northwest of Roanoke, Virginia, in conditions of rain, clouds, fog, and zero visibility. The pilot and four other passengers were also killed.

The aircraft was a twin-engine Aero Commander 680 flown by a pilot who had a private-pilot license and a reported 8,000 hours of flying time, but who held no instrument rating. The aircraft was recovered on 31 May. After her husband's death, Pamela Murphy moved into a small apartment and got a clerk position at the Sepulveda Veterans Administration Hospital in Los Angeles, where she remained employed for 35 years.

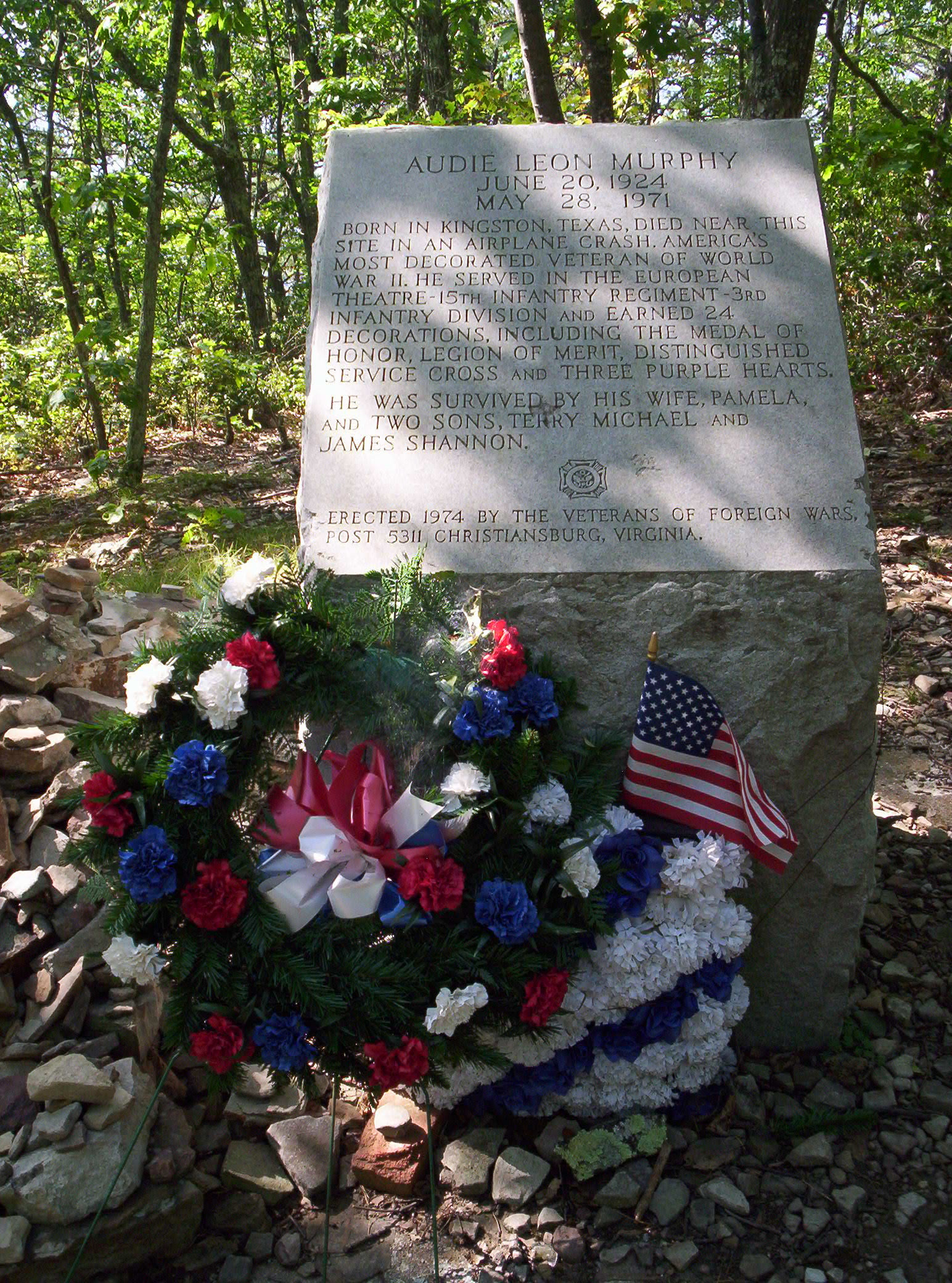
Monument at the site of the Virginia plane crash in which Audie Murphy was killed

On 7 June 1971, Murphy was buried with military honors at Arlington National Cemetery. In attendance were Ambassador to the U.N. George H. W. Bush, Army Chief of Staff William Westmoreland, and many of the 3rd Infantry Division. Murphy's gravesite is in Section 46, headstone number 46-366-11, located across Memorial Drive from the Amphitheater. A special flagstone walkway was later constructed to accommodate the large number of people who visit to pay their respects. It is the cemetery's second most-visited gravesite, after that of President John F. Kennedy.

The headstones of Medal of Honor recipients buried at Arlington National Cemetery are normally decorated in gold leaf. Murphy previously requested that his stone remain plain and inconspicuous, like that of an ordinary soldier. The headstone contains the birth year 1924, based upon purportedly falsified materials among his military records.

In 1974, a large granite marker was erected just off the Appalachian Trail at 37.364554°N 80.225748°W at 3,100 ft elevation, near the crash site. In 1975, a court awarded Murphy's widow, Pamela, and their two children $2.5 million in damages because of the accident.

Civilian honors were bestowed on Murphy during his lifetime and posthumously, including a star on the Hollywood Walk of Fame. In 2013, Murphy was honored by his home state with the Texas Legislative Medal of Honor. (Note: The actual award was presented by Governor Rick Perry to Murphy's family on 29 October 2013 at a ceremony in Farmersville, Texas.)

== Songwriting ==
David McClure, his collaborator on the book To Hell and Back, discovered Murphy's talent for poetry during their work on the memoir when he found discarded verses in Murphy's Hollywood apartment. One of those poems, "The Crosses Grow on Anzio", appears in To Hell and Back attributed to a soldier named Kerrigan. Only two others survived, "Alone and Far Removed" and "Freedom Flies in Your Heart Like an Eagle". The latter was part of a speech Murphy had written at a 1968 dedication of the Alabama War Memorial in Montgomery, and later set to music by Scott Turner under the title "Dusty Old Helmet".

Murphy was a fan of country music, in particular Bob Wills and Chet Atkins, but was not a singer or musician himself. Through his friend Guy Mitchell, Murphy was introduced to songwriter Scott Turner in 1961. The two collaborated on numerous songs between 1962 and 1970, the most successful of which were "Shutters and Boards" and "When the Wind Blows in Chicago".
