= To Hell and Back (Murphy book) =

1949 World War II memoir by Audie Murphy

- Author: Audie Murphy
- Subject: World War II
- Publisher: First edition published by Henry Holt and Company
- Publication date: February 28, 1949

To Hell and Back is Audie Murphy's 1949 World War II memoir, detailing the events that led him to receive the Medal of Honor and also to become the most decorated infantryman of the war. Although only Murphy's name appears on the book cover, it was a collaboration with writer David "Spec" McClure. After securing a publishing contract in 1947, Murphy and McClure worked on the book through 1948 in Murphy's Hollywood apartment. Murphy did write some of the prose himself, but most of it was in "as told to" style, with the writing left to McClure. They traveled to France in 1948 where Murphy was presented with the French Legion of Honor and the Croix de Guerre with Palm from the French government. While in France, Murphy received permission to visit the battle sites. The two men retraced 1,500 mi (2,400 km) of battlefield as Murphy related details of the events to McClure.

== Adaptation and translation ==
In 1955, the book was made into a film of the same name, in which Murphy played himself. The book has had multiple printings and been translated into Dutch, Italian, French, and Slovene.
