= Robert Thomas Edlin =

U.S. Army soldier (1922–2005)

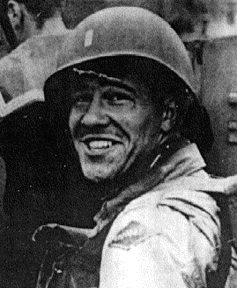
- Edlin in a landing craft, 1944
- Born: May 6, 1922
- Died: April 1, 2005 (aged 82)
- Military career
- Allegiance: United States
- Branch: United States Army
- Service years: 1939–1954
- Rank: First lieutenant
- Nickname: The Fool Lieutenant
- Units: Company A, 2nd Ranger Battalion
- Conflicts: World War II; Battle of Normandy; Battle for Brest; Battle of Hürtgen Forest; Battle of the Bulge
- Awards: Legion of Honour; Purple Heart; Distinguished Service Cross
- Other work: Law enforcement officer

Robert Thomas Edlin (May 6, 1922 – April 1, 2005) was a highly decorated United States Army Ranger officer during World War II, receiving the Distinguished Service Cross for his actions of September 9, 1944, wherein he almost singlehandedly forced the surrender of over 800 German soldiers. In 2005, he was awarded the Texas Legislative Medal of Honor posthumously by the Texas Legislature. Texas House Concurrent Resolution No. 112 conferring the honor was adopted by both the House and Senate and approved by Governor Rick Perry in March 2005.

== Military service ==
=== World War II ===
On D-Day, June 6, 1944, Lieutenant Edlin, a rifle company platoon leader in Company A, 2nd Ranger Battalion, led his platoon onto Omaha Beach, receiving debilitating wounds in both legs; evacuated to England the following day, he rejoined his platoon in France on July 15, 1944.

During the late summer of 1944, the 2nd Ranger Battalion was assigned to support the American advance in Brittany; on September 9, preceding a dawn attack on the Graf Spee, or Lochrist, battery near the French town of Le Conquet. This was a coastal artillery battery with four 280 mm (11 in) guns, three of which could be traversed towards the American forces surrounding Brest. Their 28 km (17 mi) range made them very dangerous. The German garrison had been subjected to intense fire the previous days but to get them to surrender was still a very hazardous task. Lieutenant Edlin decided to lead a four-man reconnaissance patrol to spot enemy pillboxes and snipers and chart a way through the minefield surrounding the garrison, the capture of which was critical in the effort to retake the port city.

The patrol navigated a large minefield and encountered a German pillbox, where Lieutenant Edlin captured the officer in charge; Lieutenant Edlin then forced the officer to escort him and his interpreter to the commanding officer of the Graf Spee battery. On entering the commander's office, Lieutenant Edlin took a grenade, pulled the pin, and held the grenade to the commander's stomach, forcing him to surrender the fort, along with four 280 mm guns, supporting small-arms positions, pillboxes, and approximately 800 enemy soldiers.

Edlin joined the Indiana National Guard's 38th Infantry Division at New Albany, Indiana at seventeen years of age. He was mobilized with the 38th Infantry Division to Camp Shelby, Mississippi, where he opted to become an officer. After his officer's training, he was transferred to the 28th Infantry Division (Pennsylvania National Guard). After several unsuccessful attempts to gain transfer from the 28th, he volunteered for the Rangers to secure his transfer. After World War II, he returned to the Indiana National Guard, however he left the Guard because of their reluctance to integrate African-American soldiers into units. He later moved to Corpus Christi, Texas, where he retired from law enforcement and opened Edlin's Auction House. (This information can be found in the book The Fool Lieutenant, cited below.)

==== Medal of Honor ====
(Distinguished Service Cross)

Edlin was recommended by Lieutenant Colonel James Earl Rudder ("Rudder's Rangers"), commander of the 2nd Ranger Battalion, for the Medal of Honor. Lt. Edlin was awarded the Distinguished Service Cross for extraordinary heroism.

== Ranger Hall of Fame ==
In 1995, Edlin was inducted into the Ranger Hall of Fame.

== Texas Legislative Medal of Honor ==
Edlin was awarded the Texas Legislative Medal of Honor posthumously in May 2005, just after his death on April 1.

== Book ==
The book by Marica Moen and Margo Heinen, The Fool Lieutenant: A Personal Account of D-Day and WWII, about his wartime experiences, was published in 2002 by Meadowlark Publishing Inc., Elk River, MN. First Edition, 2000. ISBN 0-97052-570-2
