= Texas Legislative Medal of Honor =

- Type: Military decoration
- Awarded for: Gallantry
- Description: The neck ribbon is green with white stars, and the medal features an image of the reverse of the Seal of Texas, including Vince's Bridge, cannon of the Battle of Gonzales, Alamo Mission in San Antonio and the six historical flags of Texas.
- Presented by: Texas Legislature and Texas Military Department
- Eligibility: Texas Military Forces and United States Armed Forces
- Status: Currently issued
- Established: May 3, 1963
- First award: 1997
- Final award: 2024

Highlights
- Total: 16
- Texas Legislative Medal of Honor medal ribbon

Precedence
- Next (higher): None (highest)
- Next (lower): Lone Star Medal of Valor

The Texas Legislative Medal of Honor, commonly referred to as the Texas Medal of Honor, is the highest military decoration that can be conferred to a service member of the Texas Military Forces. It can also be conferred to service members of the United States Armed Forces. Subsequent decorations are conferred by a gold twig of four oak leaves with three acorns on the stem device. A lapel button is also conferred with this decoration.

== Eligibility ==
The Texas Legislative Medal of Honor shall be conferred to a member of the Texas Military Forces or United States Armed Forces (effective June 20, 2003) designated by concurrent resolution of the legislature who voluntarily performs a deed of personal bravery or self-sacrifice involving risk of life that is so conspicuous as to clearly distinguish the person for gallantry and intrepidity above the person's comrades. Decoration shall be considered on the standard of extraordinary merit. Decoration is only conferred on incontestable proof of performance of the deed. Unlike the Congressional Medal of Honor, "above and beyond the call of duty" is not specifically required.

Initially, the law permitted one person to be selected from various nominees for the decoration by a 5-member nominating committee (effective June 20, 2003) every two years since 1997. The nominating committee consists of the Lieutenant Governor, the Speaker of the House, the Adjutant General of the Texas Military Forces and the chairs of the Senate Veteran Affairs Committee and the Defense and Veterans Affairs Committee in the House of Representatives. The law reads in part:

(d) The legislature by concurrent resolution may direct the governor to confer the Texas Legislative Medal of Honor to a person nominated by the nominating committee. The committee chairs serving on the nominating committee shall jointly prepare a concurrent resolution directing the governor to confer the medal to a person nominated. The legislature may direct the medal to be conferred only during a

In 2013, HB 1589 was signed into law by Governor Rick Perry amending the statute for the bestowal of two Texas Legislative Medals of Honor each legislative session, one for service pre-1956 and one for service post-1957.

On May 18, 2023, the Texas Senate passed Rep. Terry Wilson's HB 4421 by a 31–0 vote to award the Texas Legislative Medal of Honor to any Texan who has received the Medal of Honor. The legislation further established three time periods for the award as pre-1955, 1955 to September 10, 2001, and September 11, 2001, to the present date.

== Authority ==
The Texas Legislative Medal of Honor was authorized by the Fifty-eighth Texas Legislature in Senate Bill Number 279 by Senator Babe Schwartz and was approved by the Governor John Connally on May 3, 1963, effective August 23, 1963. The first recipient was not awarded until 1997 when Representative Tommy Merritt discovered that the award existed and had never been awarded. Senator Jerry Patterson, then the chair of the Veteran Affairs and Military Installations Committee, assisted in the process of selecting the first recipient and creating a process for the further awarding of the medal.

== Recipients ==
Date conferred	Service Member	Abbreviated Citation	Texas Military Unit	Branch of Service	Conflict/Event	Ref
1997	James Logan	First Texas Medal of Honor recipient; undertook heroic acts to halt a German counterattack. Awarded the Medal of Honor.	141st Infantry Regiment	Texas National Guard	Operation Avalanche	
1999	Jack Knight	Single-handedly destroyed two Imperial Japanese pillboxes; was killed by grenade while attacking a third pillbox. Awarded the Medal of Honor.	124th Cavalry Regiment	Texas National Guard	Burma Road assault	
2001	Roy Benavidez	Voluntarily entered a combat zone; saved the lives of at least eight men; shot seven times, stabbed twice, 28 fragmentation wounds. Awarded the Medal of Honor.	Texas native; not in Texas Military unit at time of citation.	United States Army	Cambodia rescue mission	
2003	Mode Etheredge	Took command after CO was killed; while wounded led unit over 700 yards under fire; achieved unit objective; awarded the Silver Star.	Texas native; not in Texas Military unit at time of citation.	United States Army	Battle of Anzio	
2005	Robert Edlin	Led four Rangers through a minefield, captured four Krupp K5 guns, and 800 German soldiers. Awarded the Distinguished Service Cross.	Texas citizen; not in Texas Military unit at time of citation.	United States Army	Battle for Brest	
2007	Alfredo Gonzalez	Saved a Marine; while wounded, single-handedly destroyed Viet Cong position; was killed attacking additional positions. Awarded the Medal of Honor.	Texas native; not in Texas Military unit at time of citation.	United States Marine Corps	Battle of Huế	
2009	Pedro Cano	Single-handedly destroyed nine Nazi machine-gun positions. Awarded the Medal of Honor.	Texas citizen; not in Texas Military unit at time of citation.	United States Army	Battle of Hürtgen Forest	
2011	Roy Cisneros	Single-handedly charged a fortified enemy position; killed during assault; awarded the Navy Cross.	Texas native; not in Texas Military unit at time of citation.	United States Marine Corps	Quảng Trị Province patrol	
2013	Darryn Andrews	Killed while saving three soldiers during IED and RPG attack. Awarded the Silver Star.	Texas citizen; not in Texas Military unit at time of citation.	United States Army	Paktika Province patrol	
2013	Audie Murphy	Single-handedly halted a tank attack; killed or wounded fifty German soldiers; launched a counterattack while wounded. Awarded the Medal of Honor.	Texas native; not in Texas Military unit at time of citation.	United States Army	Colmar Pocket	
2015	Chris Kyle	Served four tours of duty; survived six IEDs and two gunshot wounds; single-handedly killed at least 150 enemy combatants. Awarded the Silver Star.	Texas native; not in Texas Military unit at time of citation.	United States Navy	Operation Iraqi Freedom	
2015	William Dyess	Survived the Bataan Death March; organized the only large-scale escape of prisoners of war in the Pacific Theater. Awarded the Distinguished Service Cross.	Texas native; not in Texas Military unit at time of citation.	United States Army Air Corps	Battle of Bataan	
2017	Travis Watkins	Saved 30 soldiers; fought to the death while paralyzed from the waist down. Awarded the Medal of Honor.	Texas citizen; not in Texas Military unit at time of citation.	United States Army	Battle of Yongsan	
2019	George Turner	Awarded the Medal of Honor for heroic courage and initiative during World War II at Phillippsbourg, France on January 3, 1945.	Texas native; not in a Texas Military unit.	United States Army	European theatre of World War II	
2021	Marcelino Serna	Extreme heroism in single-handedly capturing 24 Germans during an engagement in WWI. Awarded the Distinguished Service Cross.	Texas resident; not in Texas Military unit at time of citation.	United States Army	Battle of Meuse-Argonne	
2021	William Flores	Gave his life in attempting save fellow Coast Guardsmen during the sinking of the USCGC Blackthorn. Awarded the Coast Guard Medal.	Texas citizen; not in Texas Military unit at time of citation.	United States Coast Guard	Sinking of the USCGC Blackthorn	
2023	Jerry Bell	Served in the U.S. Army and in Vietnam. Given for his career service and not a single heroic event. Uncle of Rep. Cecil Bell.	Texas resident	United States Army	Vietnam War and entire career	
2023	Mike C. Pena	Gave his life in defending his fellow soldiers in the Korean War. Awarded the Medal of Honor.	Texas citizen; not in Texas Military unit at time of citation.	United States Army	Battle of Tabu-dong	

== See also ==
- Awards and decorations of the Texas Military
- Awards and decorations of the Texas government
- Texas Military Forces
- Texas Military Department
- List of conflicts involving the Texas Military
