= Bouchot =

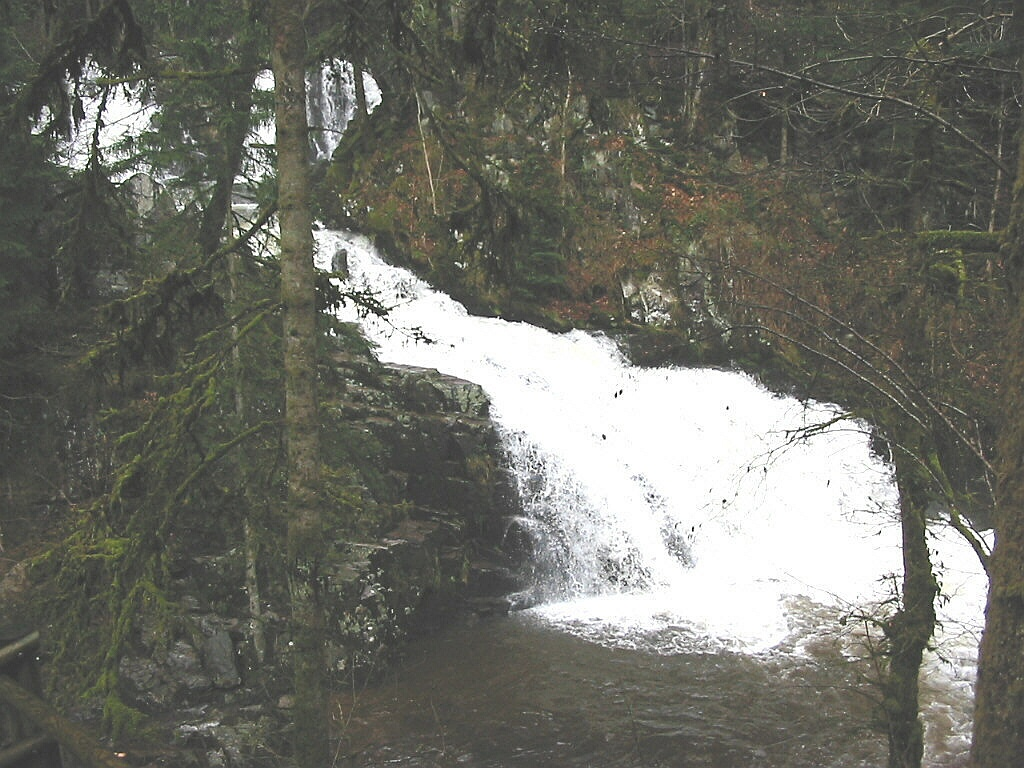
- The Saut du Bouchot

- Location within France Location within Grand Est

Location
- Country: France

Physical characteristics
- Source
  - location: Massif des Vosges
- Mouth: Moselotte
  - coordinates: 48.0109°N 6.7098°E
- Length: 18.1 km (11.2 mi)
- Basin size: 56.9 km^{2} (22.0 mi^{2})
- Discharge
  - average: 1.96 m^{3}/s (69 cu ft/s)

Basin features
- Progression: Moselotte→ Moselle→ Rhine→ North Sea

For people with the surname, see Bouchot (surname).

The Bouchot (French pronunciation: [buʃo]) is a river in the French region of Grand Est which flows in the Vosges department. It is a right tributary of the Moselotte, and thus a sub-tributary of the Rhine via the Moselotte and the Moselle. It is 18.1 km (11.2 mi) long.

== Geography ==
The Bouchot rises in the Massif des Vosges, on a flank of the Tête de Grouvelin, a peak located within the commune of Gérardmer in the Bas-Rupts section. The Bouchot is thus also known as the ruisseau des Hauts-Rupts from its source to its confluence with the ruisseau des Bas-Rupts. It flows through Rochesson, follows Gerbamont, then flows into Sapois where the ruisseau de Menaurupt joins its right bank. After flowing through Vagney, it joins the right bank of the Moselotte.

At Gerbamont, it cascades at the Saut du Bouchot, a waterfall that is 28 metres (92 ft) high.

== Hydrology ==
The hydrological discharge of the Bouchot, measured at its confluence with the Moselle, is 1.96 cubic metres per second (69 cu ft/s) for a watershed of 56.9 square kilometres (22.0 mi^{2}). The runoff curve number in the watershed is 1,086 millimetres (42.8 in), which is very high, a characteristic shared with other rivers in the Vosges region. It is more than three times higher than the average for France including all basins, and also larger by a wide margin than the French basin of the Moselle, which is 445 millimetres (17.5 in) at Hauconcourt downstream of Metz ). The Bouchot's specific flow rate thus comes in very high, at 34.45 litres per second per square kilometre of watershed.

== Main tributaries ==
- Ruisseau des Bas Rupts
- Ruisseau de Creusegoutte
- Ruisseau de Noire-goutte
- Goutte de Jossonfaing
- Goutte de Battion
- Goutte de Plainfaing
- Goutte de Frimont
- Goutte du Herray
- Ruisseau de Peute-goutte
- Goutte Mathias
- Ruisseau de Menaurupt
- Ruisseau des Naufaings

== See also ==
- List of rivers of France
