= Lande =

Lande may refer to:

== Places ==
- Lande, Østfold, Norway
- Lande, Norway, a village in the municipality of Brønnøy in Nordland, Norway
- Château de la Lande (disambiguation), various castles in France
- Lac de la Lande, a lake in Vosges, France

== Other uses ==
- Lande (surname)

== See also ==
- Landé g-factor, a type of g-factor
- Landé interval rule, a rule in atomic physics
- Landes (disambiguation)
