= Xoulces =

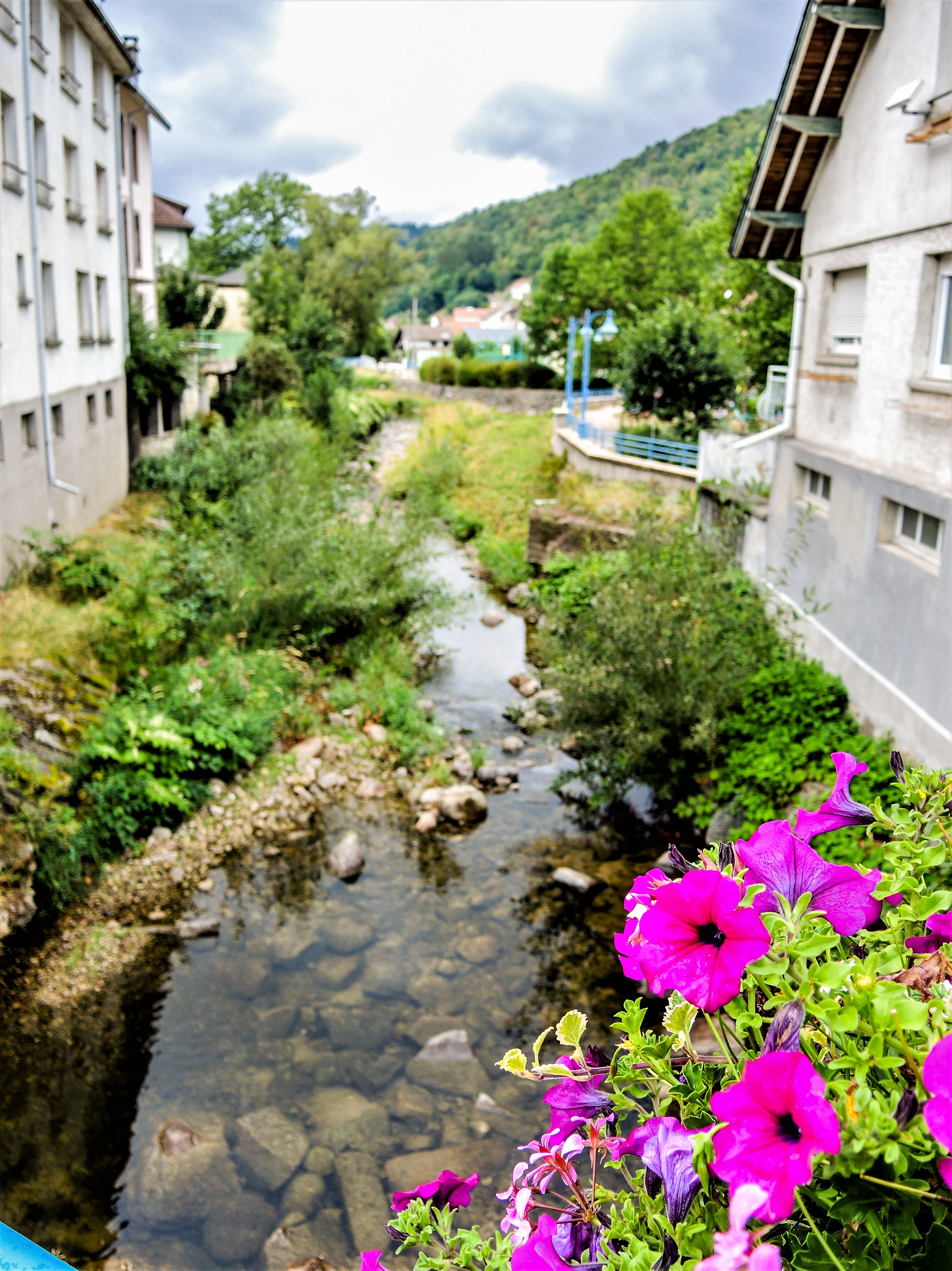

- Location within France Location within Grand Est

Location
- Country: France

Physical characteristics
- Mouth
  - location: Moselotte
  - coordinates: 47.9619°N 6.8356°E
- Length: 9.4 km (5.8 mi)
- Basin size: 24.5 km^{2} (9.5 mi^{2})
- Discharge
  - average: 1.10 m^{3}/s (39 cu ft/s)

Basin features
- Progression: Moselotte→ Moselle→ Rhine→ North Sea

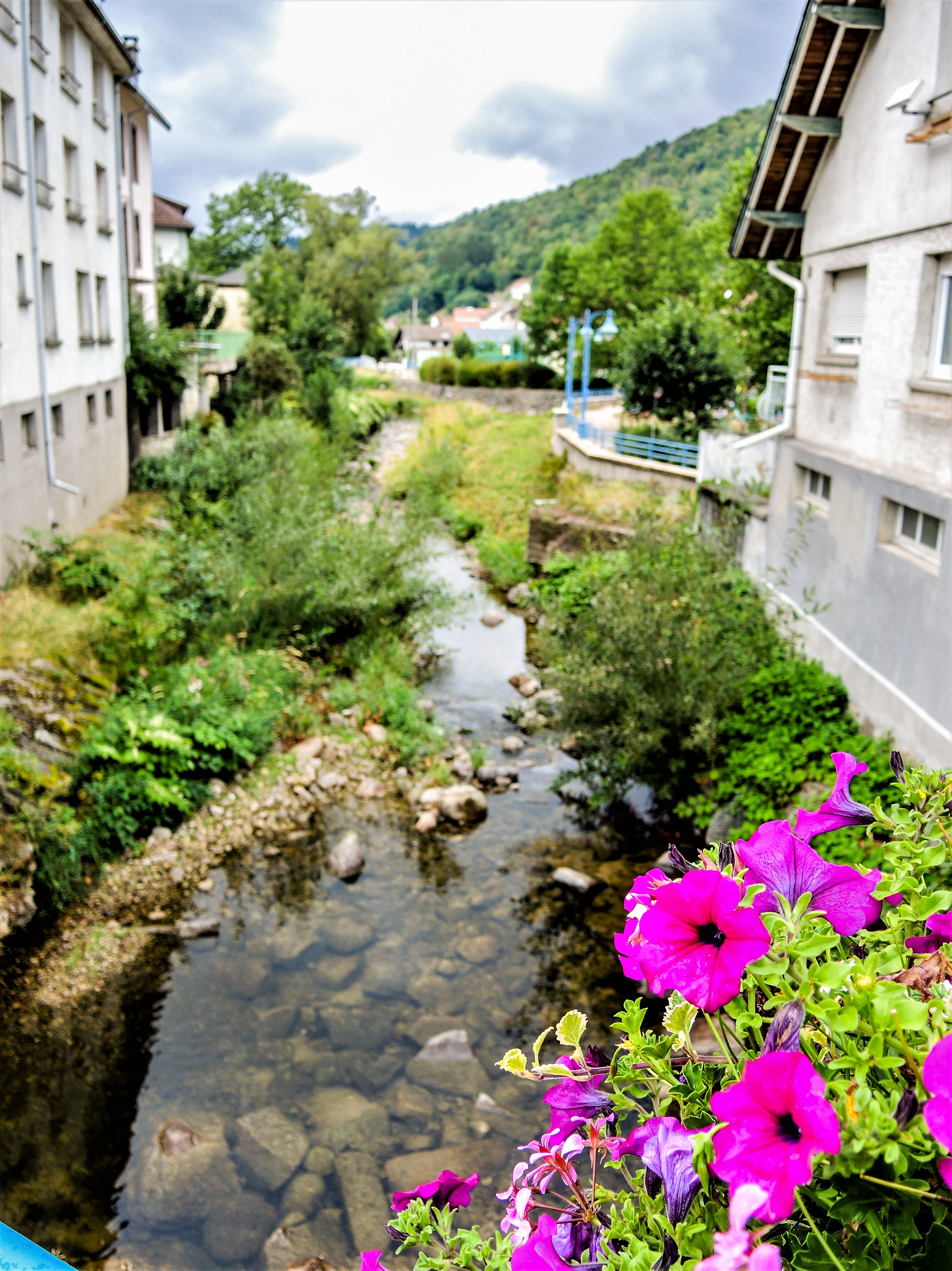
The Xoulces River in Cornimont, Vosges.

The Xoulces is a small but abundant river in France which flows in Lorraine in the Vosges department. It is a left tributary of the Moselotte, and thus a sub-tributary of the Rhine via the Moselotte and the Moselle. It is 9.4 km (5.8 mi) long.

== Geography ==
The river starts from the confluence of the Rouge Rupt and the Goutte du Grand Clos in the massif des Vosges. Its course lies entirely in the commune of Cornimont.

== Hydrology ==
The hydrological discharge of the Xoulces measured at its confluence with the Moselotte is 1.10 cubic metres per second (39 cu ft/s), for a watershed of 24.5 square kilometres (9.5 mi^{2}). The runoff curve number in the watershed is 1,416 millimetres (55.7 in), which is highly abundant and comparable to the average for rivers in the Moselotte basin. It is more than four times higher than the average for France including all basins, but also three times higher than average for the French Moselle basin, 445 millimetres (17.5 in) at Hauconcourt downstream of Metz). The specific flow rate of the Xoulces thus rises to 44.9 litres per second per square kilometre of watershed.

== See also ==
- List of rivers of France
