= Landee =

Landee is a surname. Notable people with the surname include:

- Donn Landee (1947–2026), American record producer and recording engineer
- Frank A. Landee (1852–1917), American businessman and politician

== See also ==
- Lande (surname)
- Lander (surname)
