= Cleurie (river) =

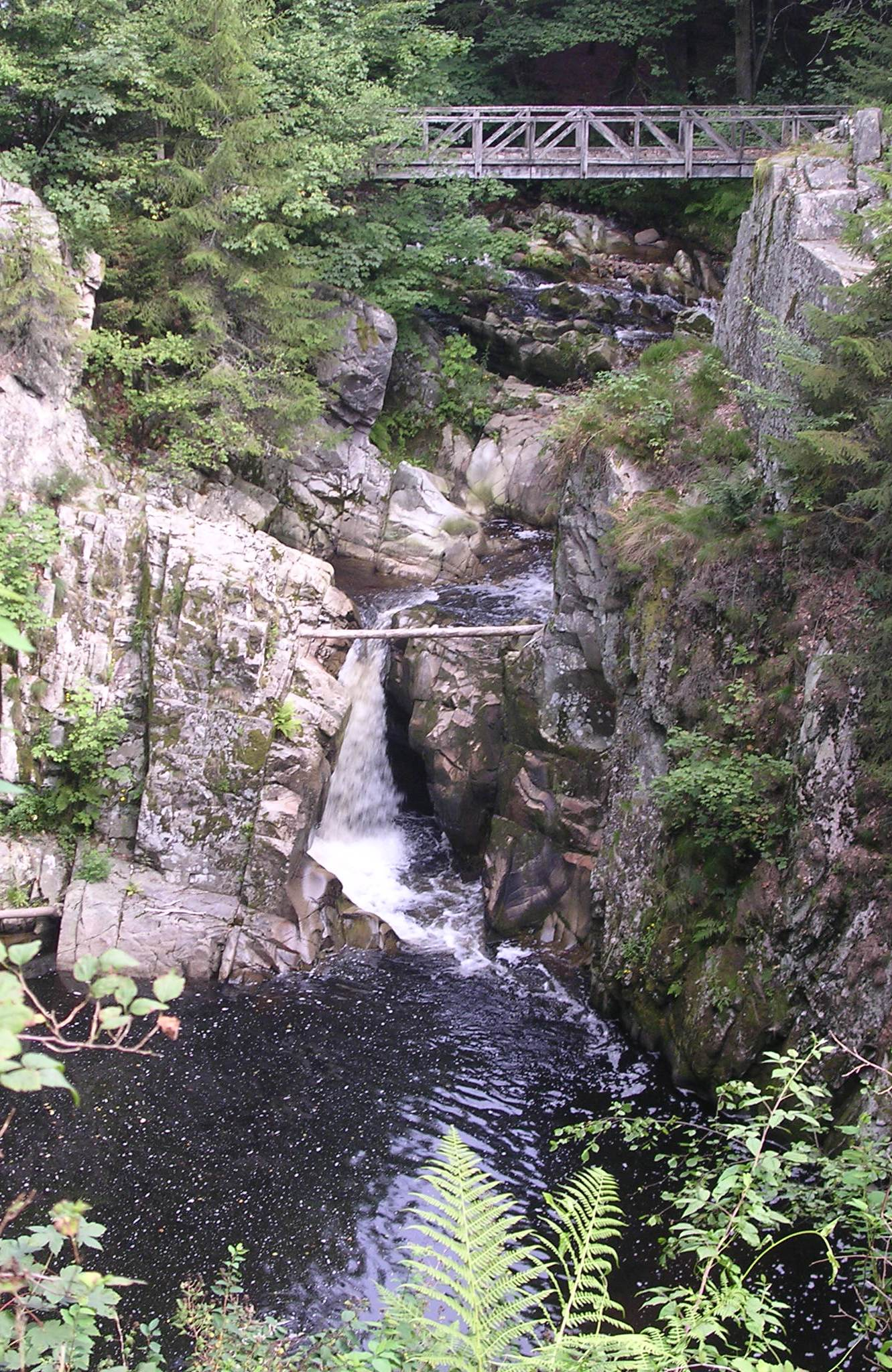
- Saut de la Cuve cascade on the Cleurie

- Location within France Location within Grand Est

Location
- Country: France

Physical characteristics
- Source
  - location: Vosges Mountains
- Mouth: Moselotte
  - coordinates: 48.021°N 6.6736°E
- Length: 19 km (12 mi)
- Basin size: 77.5 km^{2} (29.9 mi^{2})
- Discharge
  - average: 2.60 m^{3}/s (92 cu ft/s)

Basin features
- Progression: Moselotte→ Moselle→ Rhine→ North Sea

The Cleurie or rupt de Cleurie is a river in Lorraine in France, which flows in the Vosges department. It is a right tributary of the Moselotte, and thus a sub-tributary of the Rhine, via the Moselotte and the Moselle. It is 18.9 km (11.7 mi) long.

== Geography ==
The Cleurie rises in the massif des Vosges, within the commune of Gérardmer from the confluence of two streams, the Corsaire and the Noir Rupt. It receives Liézey stream on its right, flows through Le Tholy, follows La Forge, Le Syndicat and Cleurie, then flows into the right bank of the Moselotte at Saint-Amé.

Its name is found in the denomination of the Communauté de communes de la Vallée de la Cleurie.

== Hydrology ==
The flow rate of the Cleurie river has been measured at Cleurie over 38 years from 1967 to 2007. The measurement station is 5 kilometres (3 mi) from the river's confluence with the Moselotte. The watershed of the river there is 68 square kilometres (26 mi^{2}), or about 88 percent of that at its mouth.

The river's average interannual flow rate or discharge at Cleurie is 2.39 cubic metres per second (84 cu ft/s).

The Cleurie river exhibits moderate seasonal variation in flow rate. High water occurs at the end of autumn and in winter, and are typified by monthly average instantaneous flow rates of between 2.82 and 3.54 cubic metres per second (100 and 125 cu ft/s), from November to March inclusive, with a maximum in December and January. Low water occurs in spring, from July to September inclusive, with a minimum monthly average flow rate of 1.02 cubic metres per second (36 cu ft/s) in August. These monthly averages, however, hide more pronounced short-term variations, especially since the flow rate varies from year to year.

At low water, the 3-year low instantaneous flow rate can drop to 0.290 cubic metres per second (10.2 cu ft/s), or 290 litres per second (77 USgal/s), which is hardly very severe.

Floods can be very significant for a small river endowed with a minimal basin. The maximum instantaneous flow rates over a 2-year and 5-year period (MIFR2 and MIFR5) measure 27 and 35 cubic metres per second (950 and 1,240 cu ft/s) respectively. The MIFR10 measures 41 cubic metres per second (1,400 cu ft/s), the MIFR20 measures 47 cubic metres per second (1,700 cu ft/s) and the MIFR50 measures 54 cubic metres per second (1,900 cu ft/s). These numbers correspond to about a third of the flooding flow rates of the Moselotte.

The maximum instantaneous flow rate ever recorded at Cleurie over the entire period for which measurements exist was 51.7 cubic metres per second (1,830 cu ft/s) on 25 January 1995, while the maximum ever recorded daily average value was 33.3 cubic metres per second (1,180 cu ft/s) the same day. Comparing these values with the scale of the MIFR's listed above suggests that the floods of January 1995 were almost of the order of IMFR50 and quite exceptional, and that a flood of that size should occur on average once every 40 years.

All in all, the Cleurie is a very significant river. The runoff curve number in its watershed is 1,114 millimetres (43.9 in) annually, which is more than three times higher than the overall average of France, and substantially more than the average of the whole French Moselle basin measured at 225 millimetres (8.9 in) downstream of Metz. The specific flow rate is very high at 35.2 litres per second per square kilometre of basin.

== See also ==
- List of rivers of France
