= Blizzards Run =

River in Pennsylvania, U.S.

Coordinates: 40.9612°N 76.6123°W

Blizzards Run Frazier's Run
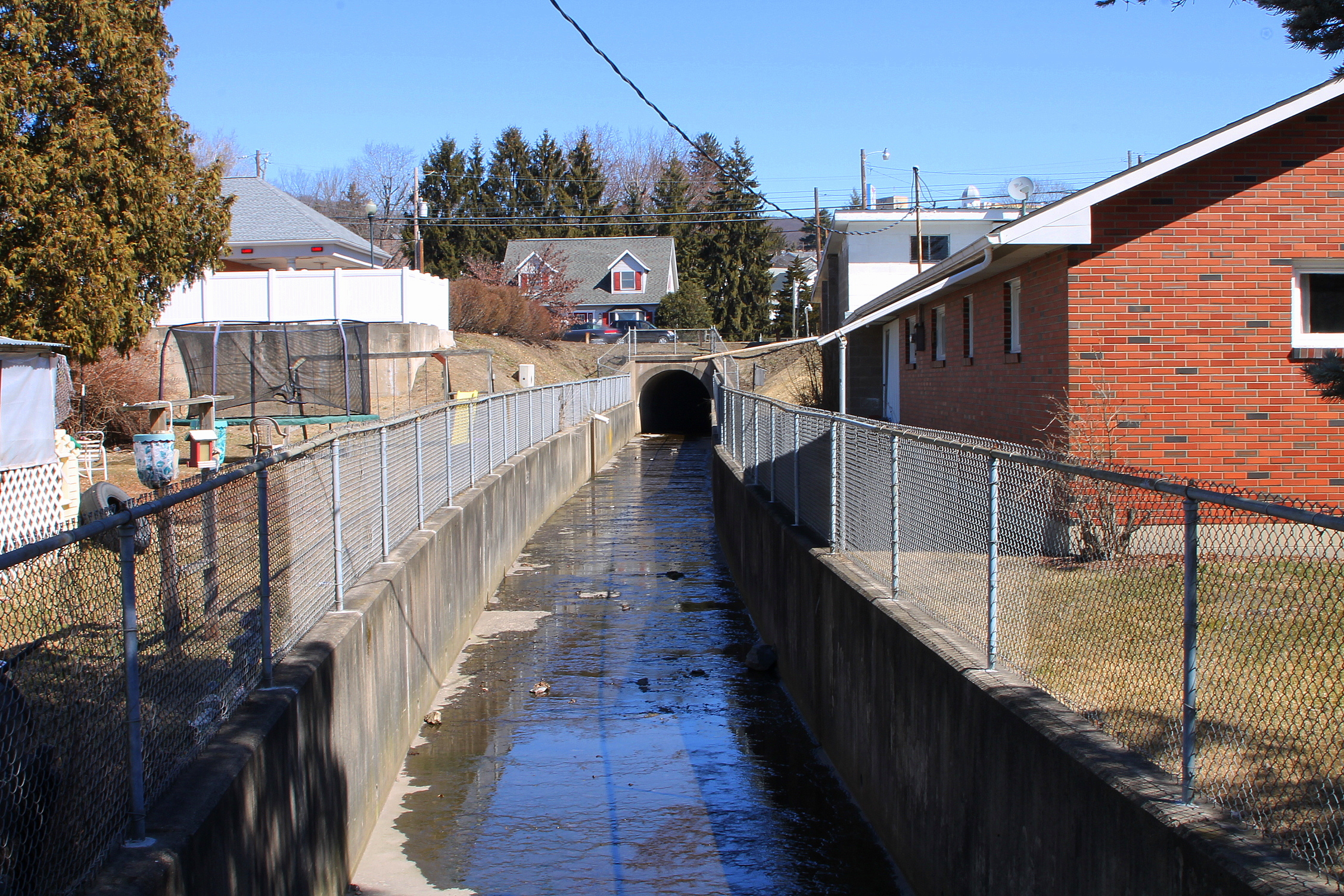
- Blizzards Run looking upstream in its lower reaches

Physical characteristics
- Source
  - location: northeastern Mahoning Township, Montour County, Pennsylvania
  - elevation: 860 ft (260 m)
- Mouth
  - location: Sechler Run in Danville, Pennsylvania
  - elevation: 456 ft (139 m)
- Length: 2.6 mi (4.2 km)
- Basin size: 1.87 mi^{2} (4.8 km^{2})

Basin features
- Progression: Sechler Run → Mahoning Creek → Susquehanna River → Chesapeake Bay

Blizzards Run (also known as Blizzard Run or Blizzard's Run) is a tributary of Sechler Run in Montour County, Pennsylvania, in the United States. It is approximately 2.6 miles (4.2 km) long and flows through Mahoning Township and Danville. The watershed of the stream has an area of 1.87 sq mi (4.8 km^{2}). The stream has two unnamed tributaries. Several businesses were historically located along it, and there was a spring nearby in the early 1900s.

== Course ==
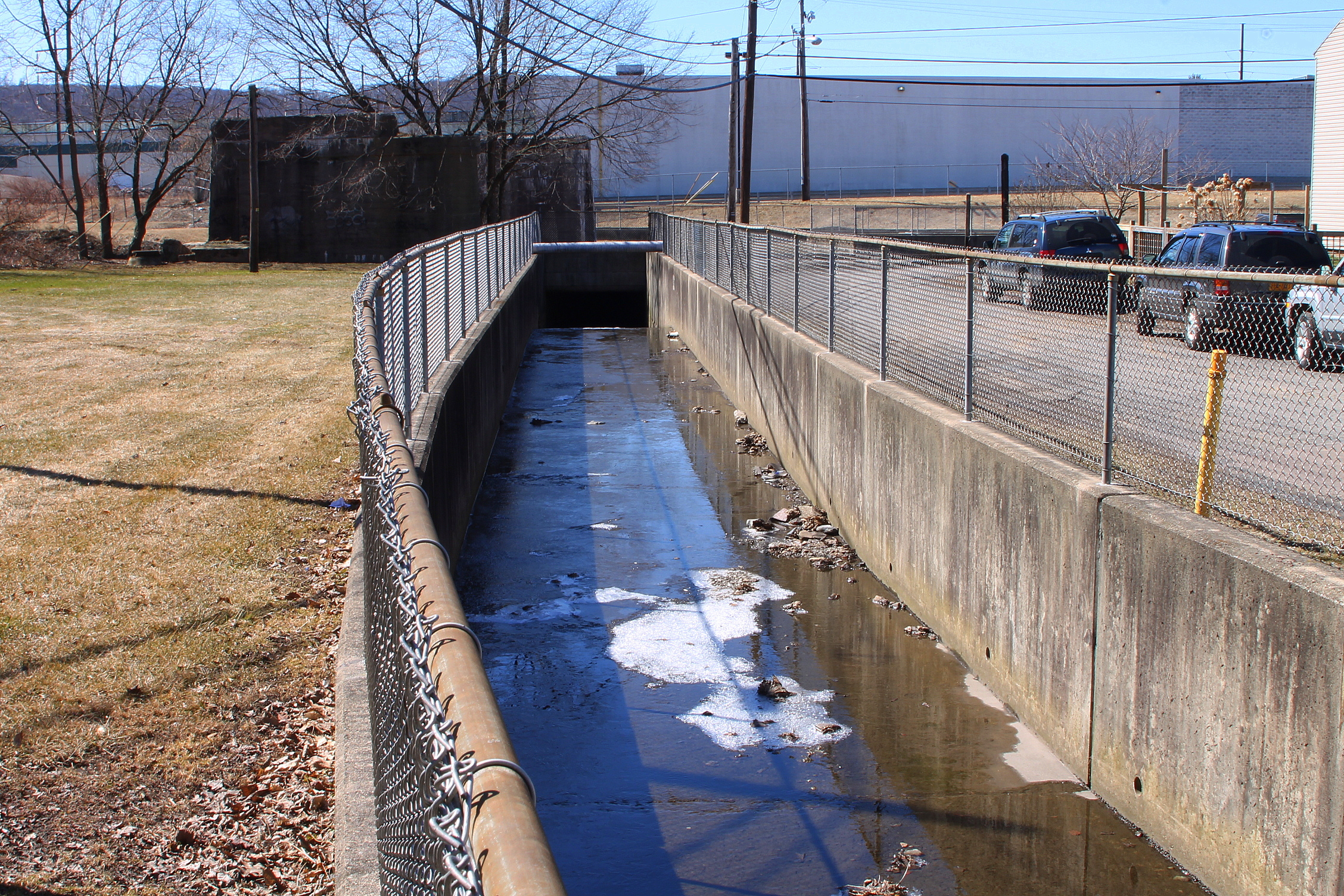
Blizzards Run looking downstream in its lower reaches

Blizzards Run begins in northeastern Mahoning Township. After less than a mile, it turns west and flows through Mechanicsville, receiving two unnamed tributaries from the right. Further on, it enters Danville, where it turns southwest. A short distance downstream, it turns south and reaches its confluence with Sechler Run.

Blizzards Run joins Sechler Run 0.58 miles (0.93 km) upstream of its mouth.

== Hydrology, geology, and geography ==
The runoff curve number at various sites on Blizzards Run ranged from 68.6 to 81.6 in 2010. The average runoff curve number between these sites was 74.9. The predicted runoff curve numbers of the stream for 2020 range from 69.5 to 82.0, with an average of 75.3. In 2010, the stormwater lag time ranged from 6.7 to 71.2 minutes, with an average of 27.3 minutes. In 2020, the predicted stormwater lag time ranges from 6.7 to 69.6 minutes, with an average of 26.8 minutes.

The elevation of Blizzards Run near its mouth is 456 ft (139 m) above sea level. Near its source, the elevation of the stream is approximately 860 ft (260 m) above sea level.

== Watershed ==
The watershed of Blizzards Run has an area of 1.87 square miles (4.8 km^{2}).

Historically, there was a spring close to the corner of Mulberry Street and Pearl Street near Blizzards Run. A 1909 report noted that it had the potential to become polluted. The spring was little-used in the early 1900s. During freshets, the waters of the stream sometimes backed up into the spring. A reservoir is also located on the stream.

== History ==
Blizzards Run is of natural origin.

In the 1800s, Blizzards Run experienced severe pollution. A number of drains connected to it and it served as an open sewer in this period. In the early 1900s, a plant belonging to the Hanover Brewing Company was based in the valley of Blizzards Run. A drain from a slaughterhouse also discharged into the stream during this period. The plant of the Danville Structural Tubing Company was situated at the mouth of the stream in the beginning of the 1900s.

In the early 1900s, Blizzards Run flowed under two railroads.

The Montour County Hazard Mitigation Plan includes erosion control along Blizzards Run to remedy flooding. In 2012, a number of residents of the Gaytowne subdivision filed a lawsuit against Mahoning Township for not following a subdivision plan and thus causing Blizzards Run to flood. The lawsuit was rejected by a Montour Count judge.

== See also ==
- List of rivers of Pennsylvania
