= Sechler Run =

Coordinates: 40°57′47″N 76°37′08″W

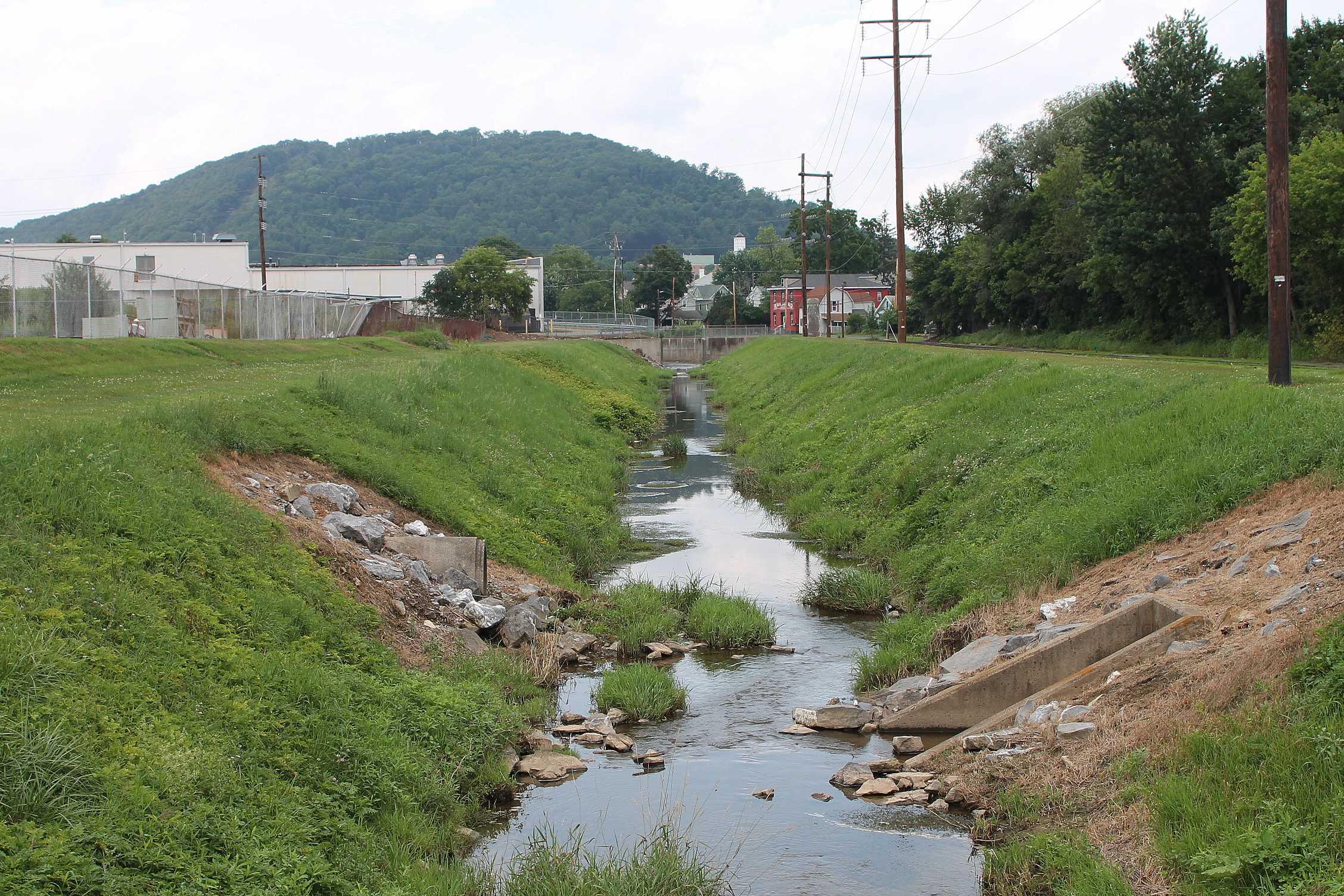
- Sechler Run in Danville

Physical characteristics
- Source
  - location: Cooper Township, Montour County, Pennsylvania
- Mouth
  - location: Mahoning Creek in Danville, Pennsylvania
  - elevation: 459 ft (140 m)
- Length: 4.6 mi (7.4 km)
- Basin size: 7.6 mi^{2} (20 km^{2})

Basin features
- Progression: Sechler Run --> Mahoning Creek --> Susquehanna River --> Chesapeake Bay
- Tributaries
  - right: Blizzards Run

Sechler Run (also known as Sechler's Run) is a tributary of Mahoning Creek in Montour County, Pennsylvania, in the United States. It is 4.63 miles (7.45 km) long. The stream flows through Cooper Township, Mahoning Township, and Danville. Its only named tributary is Blizzards Run.

A. Joseph Armstrong described Sechler Run in Danville as "on the whole uninviting" in his book Trout Unlimited's Guide to Pennsylvania Limestone Streams.

== Course ==
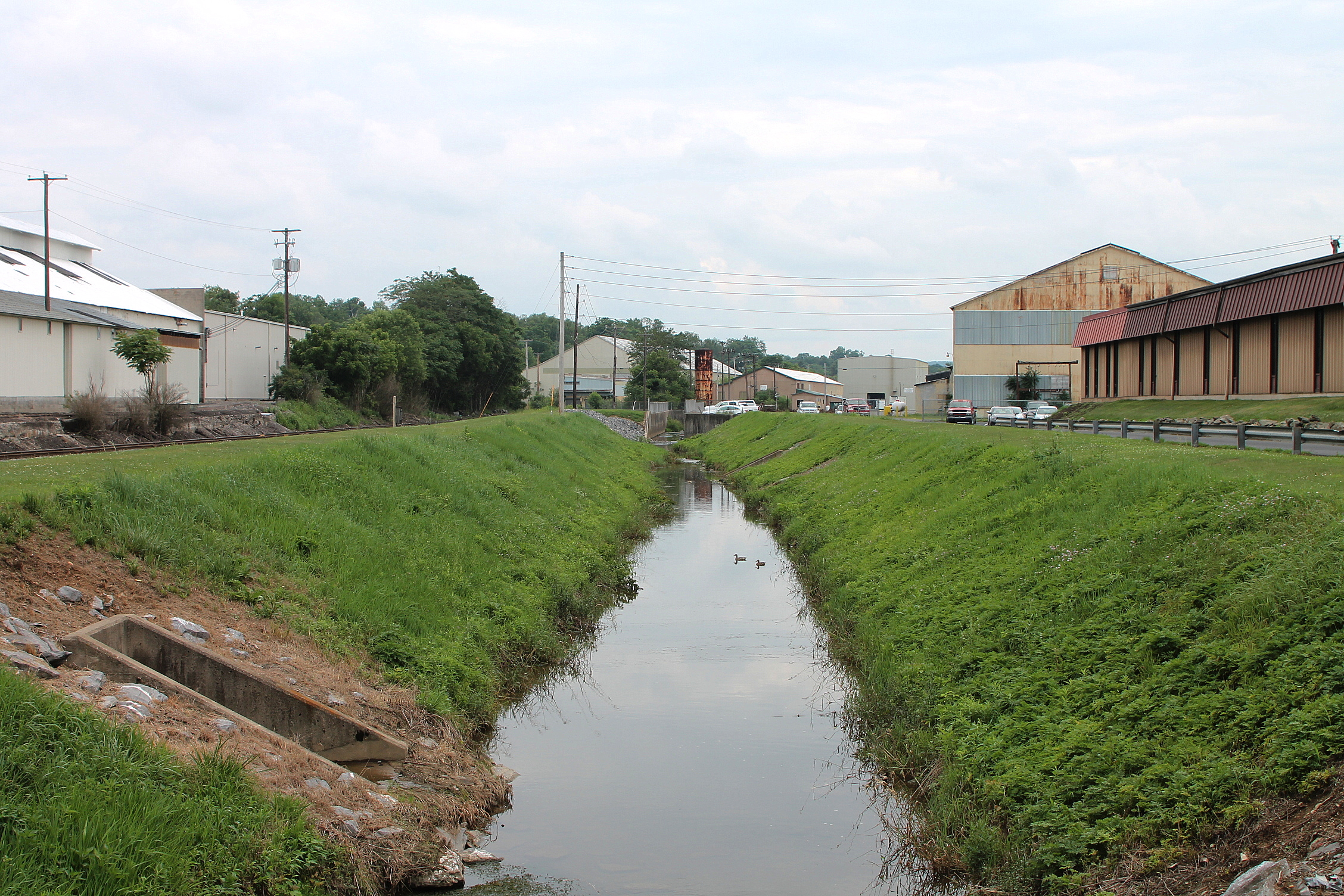
Another view of Sechler Run

Sechler Run begins in Cooper Township, near the community of Ridgeville. It flows west and slightly south and leaves Cooper Township after a short distance. Upon leaving Cooper Township, the stream enters Mahoning Township and continues flowing southwest, crossing under U.S. Route 11. It then turns northwest, crossing U.S. Route 11 again, and turns west, entering Danville after some distance. In Danville, the stream crosses U.S. Route 11 again and then crosses Pennsylvania Route 54. It reaches its confluence with Mahoning Creek shortly afterwards.

=== Tributaries ===
Blizzards Run is the only named tributary of Sechler Run. It is 1.38 miles (2.22 km) long. It flows under two railroads in Danville and reaches its confluence with Sechler Run near where the Danville Structural Tubing Company's plant stood in the early 1900s.

== Geography, geology, and hydrology ==
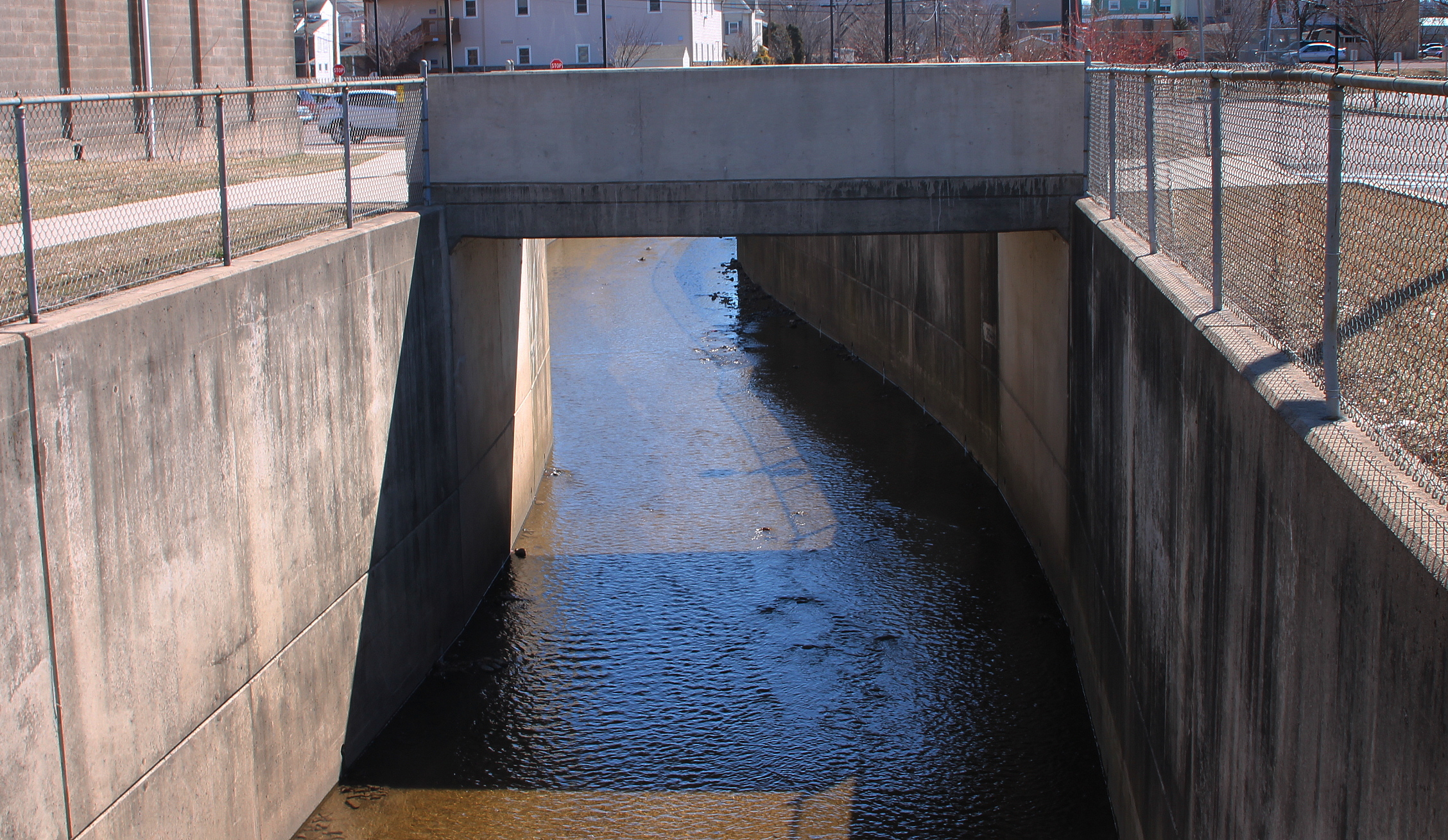
Channelized Sechler Run in Danville

The elevation of Sechler Run at its mouth is 459 feet (140 m) above sea level. The stream is channelized in Danville, sometimes with concrete. The water temperature on the stream in this location is warm, but the waters are cooler in the upper reaches of it.

Rock formations in the southernmost reaches of the watershed of Sechler Run include the Trimmers Rock Formation and the Hamilton Group. Further north in the watershed are the Bloomsburg and Mifflintown Formation undivided, the Wills Creek Formation, the Onondaga/Old Port Formation, and the Keyser and Tonoloway Formation Undivided. The Clinton Group is found yet further north in the watershed.

Most of the soil in the watershed belongs to the Berks-Weikert-Beddington soil series. However, the lower reaches of the watershed have the Chenango-Pope-Holly soil series.

Sechler Run is narrower in its upper reaches than it is in its lower reaches. The width of the stream is less than 30 feet (9.1 m).

There are a number of entities classified as "disturbances" on Sechler Run. 34.22 percent are erosion sites, 26.78 percent are deposition bars, and 18.72 percent are pipes. 8.73 percent of the disturbances are riprap, 7.11 percent are tributaries, and 1 percent are concrete walls.

Sechler Run experiences siltation. The headwaters and lower reaches of the stream are considered by the Pennsylvania Department of Environmental Protection to be impaired.

Mulberry Street in Danville can be affected by Sechler Run when it floods. The speed of the floodwaters can be as high as 6 feet (1.8 m) to 7 feet (2.1 m) per second. Backwater from the Susquehanna River can also flood the stream.

== Watershed ==
The watershed of Sechler Run has an area of 7.6 square miles. Most of the land in the watershed is agricultural land. However, there is forested land in the southern part of the watershed and developed land in the eastern part of the watershed. There are 18.16 miles (29.23 km) of streams in the watershed.

Sechler Run is located between the tracks of the Delaware, Lackawanna and Western Railroad and the former Pennsylvania Canal.

== History ==
Historically, the Danville Stove and Manufacturing Company was located near Sechler Run. The Hanover Brewing Company was located in the Blizzards Run sub-watershed, east of Danville. In the early 1900s, eight residencies on Church Street in Danville discharged water from their water closets into the stream. Historically, the stream was one border of Danville.

The waters of Sechler Run are sometimes diverted to a pumping station and then sent into Mahoning Creek. This pumping station was built in 1988.

The state of Pennsylvania has a flood protection project on Sechler Run.

== Biology ==
Sechler Run has a relatively high level of plant and animal biodiversity, especially considering that it is in an urban area.

Dragonfly larvae and crayfish have been observed in Sechler Run. This indicates relatively high water quality. However, the lower reaches of the stream do not contain many habitats for fish and none are found in this part of the stream.

Numerous chubs inhabit holding water in the upper reaches of Sechler Run, as do smaller numbers of smallmouths.

In 1916, 300 rainbow trout were distributed in Sechler Run.

Eight species of birds live in the vicinity of Sechler Run. These species are broad-winged hawk, northern flicker, red-winged blackbird, American goldfinch, eastern phoebe, song sparrow, gray catbird, and house wren.

Elodea plants inhabit the lower reaches of Sechler Run in Danville. There is a small shrub swamp on the stream. There are also areas of mesic woods in places on the stream. There are 14 species of trees in the watershed, including boxelder, hemlock, black gum, three species of maples, and others. There are five species of shrubs on the stream: Japanese barberry, witch-hazel, staghorn sumac, multiflora rose, and common blackberry. There are also 15 species of herbs on the stream.

There are several species of invasive plants in the watershed of Sechler Run. These include multiflora rose, Japanese barberry, Japanese knotweed, and garlic mustard.

== See also ==
- List of rivers of Pennsylvania
