= River engineering =

Study of human intervention in the course, characteristics, or flow of rivers

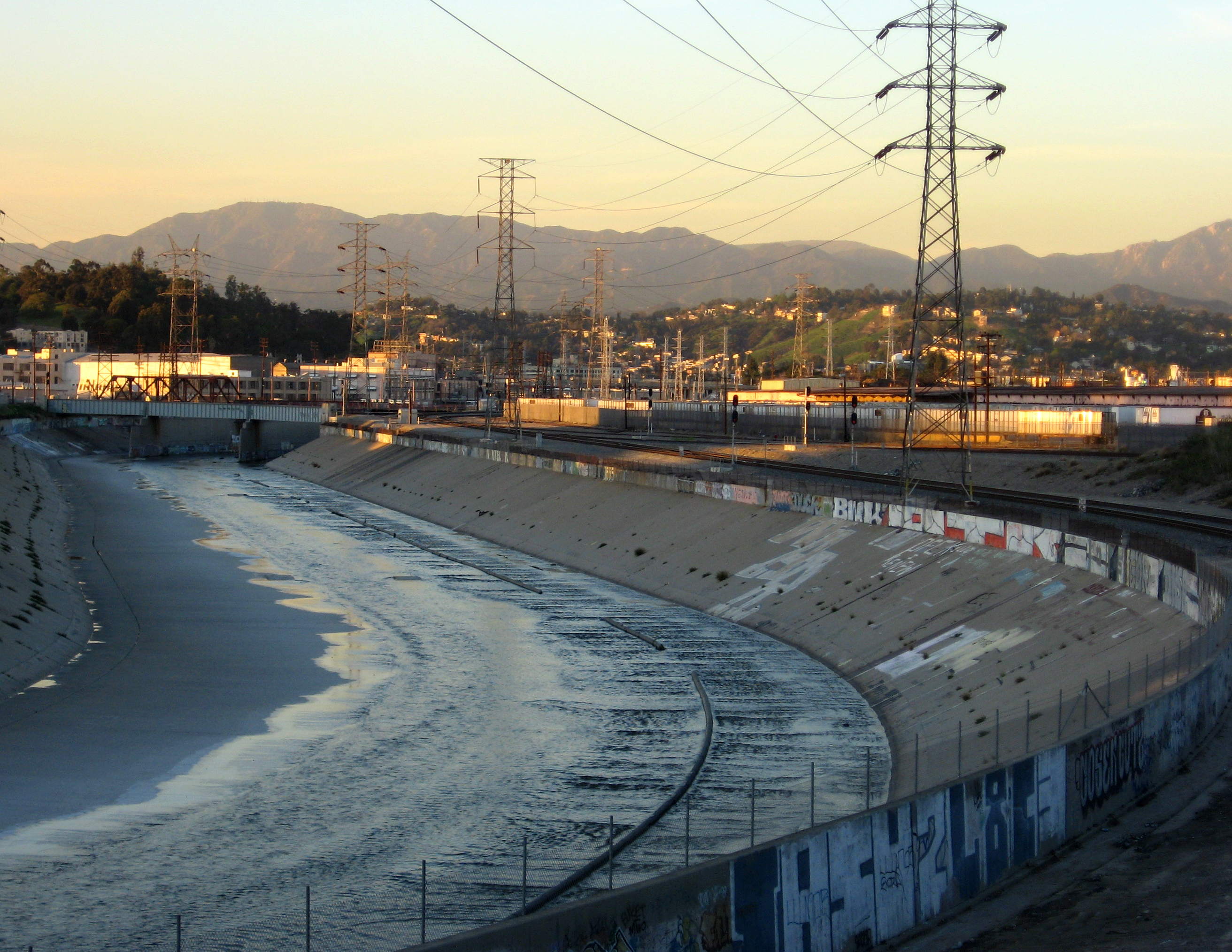
The Los Angeles River is extensively channelized with concrete embankments.

River engineering is a discipline of civil engineering which studies human intervention in the course, characteristics, or flow of a river with the intention of producing some defined benefit. People have intervened in the natural course and behaviour of rivers since before recorded history—to manage the water resources, to protect against flooding, or to make passage along or across rivers easier. Since the Yuan Dynasty and Ancient Roman times, rivers have been used as a source of hydropower.

From the late 20th century onward, the practice of river engineering has responded to environmental concerns broader than immediate human benefit. Some river engineering projects have focused exclusively on the restoration or protection of natural characteristics and habitats.

== Hydromodification ==
Hydromodification encompasses the systematic response to alterations to riverine and non-riverine water bodies such as coastal waters (estuaries and bays) and lakes. The U.S. Environmental Protection Agency (EPA) has defined hydromodification as the "alteration of the hydrologic characteristics of coastal and non-coastal waters, which in turn could cause degradation of water resources." River engineering has often resulted in unintended systematic responses, such as reduced habitat for fish and wildlife, and alterations of water temperature and sediment transport patterns.

Beginning in the late 20th century, the river engineering discipline has been more focused on repairing hydromodified degradations and accounting for potential systematic response to planned alterations by considering fluvial geomorphology. Fluvial geomorphology is the study of how rivers change their form over time. Fluvial geomorphology is the cumulation of a number of sciences including open channel hydraulics, sediment transport, hydrology, physical geology, and riparian ecology. River engineering practitioners attempt to understand fluvial geomorphology, implement a physical alteration, and maintain public safety.

== Characteristics of rivers ==
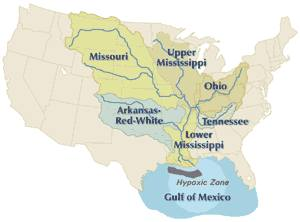
The Mississippi River basin is the largest in the United States

The size of rivers above any tidal limit and their average freshwater discharge are proportionate to the extent of their basins and the amount of rain which, after falling over these basins, reaches the river channels in the bottom of the valleys, by which it is conveyed to the sea.

The drainage basin of a river is the expanse of country bounded by a watershed (called a "divide" in North America) over which rainfall flows down towards the river traversing the lowest part of the valley, whereas the rain falling on the far slope of the watershed flows away to another river draining an adjacent basin. River basins vary in extent according to the configuration of the country, ranging from the insignificant drainage areas of streams rising on high ground near the coast and flowing straight down into the sea, up to immense tracts of continents, where rivers rising on the slopes of mountain ranges far inland have to traverse vast stretches of valleys and plains before reaching the ocean. The size of the largest river basin of any country depends on the extent of the continent in which it is situated, its position in relation to the hilly regions in which rivers generally arise and the sea into which they flow, and the distance between the source and the outlet into the sea of the river draining it.

The rate of flow of rivers depends mainly upon their fall, also known as the gradient or slope. When two rivers of different sizes have the same fall, the larger river has the quicker flow, as its retardation by friction against its bed and banks is less in proportion to its volume than is the case with the smaller river. The fall available in a section of a river approximately corresponds to the slope of the country it traverses; as rivers rise close to the highest part of their basins, generally in hilly regions, their fall is rapid near their source and gradually diminishes, with occasional irregularities, until, in traversing plains along the latter part of their course, their fall usually becomes quite gentle. Accordingly, in large basins, rivers in most cases begin as torrents with a variable flow, and end as gently flowing rivers with a comparatively regular discharge.

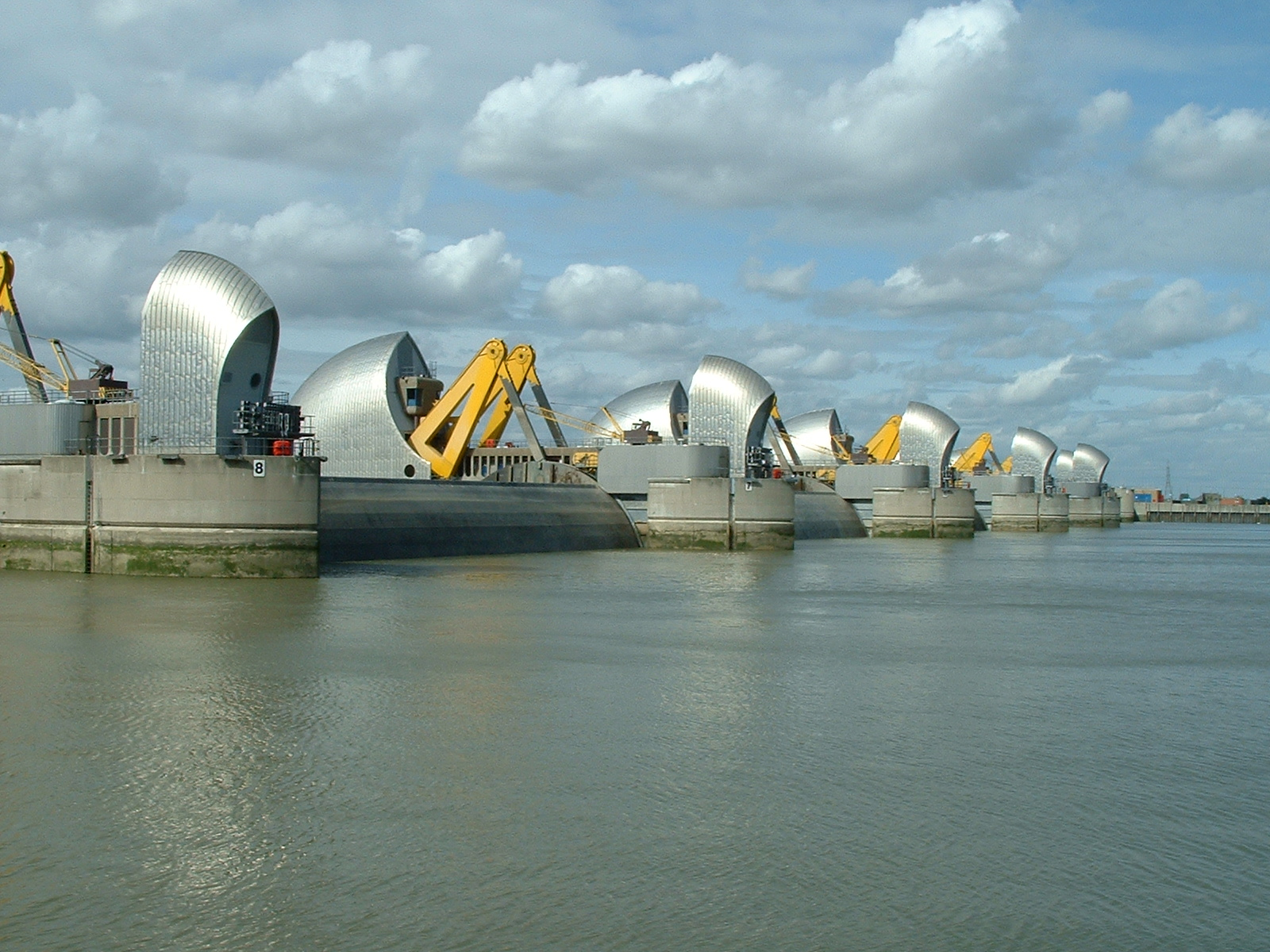
Flood control structures at the Thames Barrier in London.

The irregular flow of rivers throughout their course forms one of the main difficulties in devising works for mitigating inundations or for increasing the navigable capabilities of rivers. In tropical countries subject to periodical rains, the rivers are in flood during the rainy season and have hardly any flow during the rest of the year, while in temperate regions, where the rainfall is more evenly distributed throughout the year, evaporation causes the available rainfall to be much less in hot summer weather than in the winter months, so that the rivers fall to their low stage in the summer and are liable to be in flood in the winter. In fact, with a temperate climate, the year may be divided into a warm and a cold season, extending from May to October and from November to April in the Northern Hemisphere respectively; the rivers are low and moderate floods are of rare occurrence during the warm period, and the rivers are high and subject to occasional heavy floods after a considerable rainfall during the cold period in most years. The only exceptions are rivers which have their sources amongst mountains clad with perpetual snow and are fed by glaciers; their floods occur in the summer from the melting of snow and ice, as exemplified by the Rhône above the Lake of Geneva, and the Arve which joins it below. But even these rivers are liable to have their flow modified by the influx of tributaries subject to different conditions, so that the Rhone below Lyon has a more uniform discharge than most rivers, as the summer floods of the Arve are counteracted to a great extent by the low stage of the Saône flowing into the Rhone at Lyon, which has its floods in the winter when the Arve, on the contrary, is low.

Another serious obstacle encountered in river engineering consists in the large quantity of detritus they bring down in flood-time, derived mainly from the disintegration of the surface layers of the hills and slopes in the upper parts of the valleys by glaciers, frost and rain. The power of a current to transport materials varies with its velocity, so that torrents with a rapid fall near the sources of rivers can carry down rocks, boulders and large stones, which are by degrees ground by attrition in their onward course into slate, gravel, sand and silt, simultaneously with the gradual reduction in fall, and, consequently, in the transporting force of the current. Accordingly, under ordinary conditions, most of the materials brought down from the high lands by torrential water courses are carried forward by the main river to the sea, or partially strewn over flat alluvial plains during floods; the size of the materials forming the bed of the river or borne along by the stream is gradually reduced on proceeding seawards, so that in the Po River in Italy, for instance, pebbles and gravel are found for about 140 miles below Turin, sand along the next 100 miles, and silt and mud in the last 110 miles (176 km).

== Channelization ==
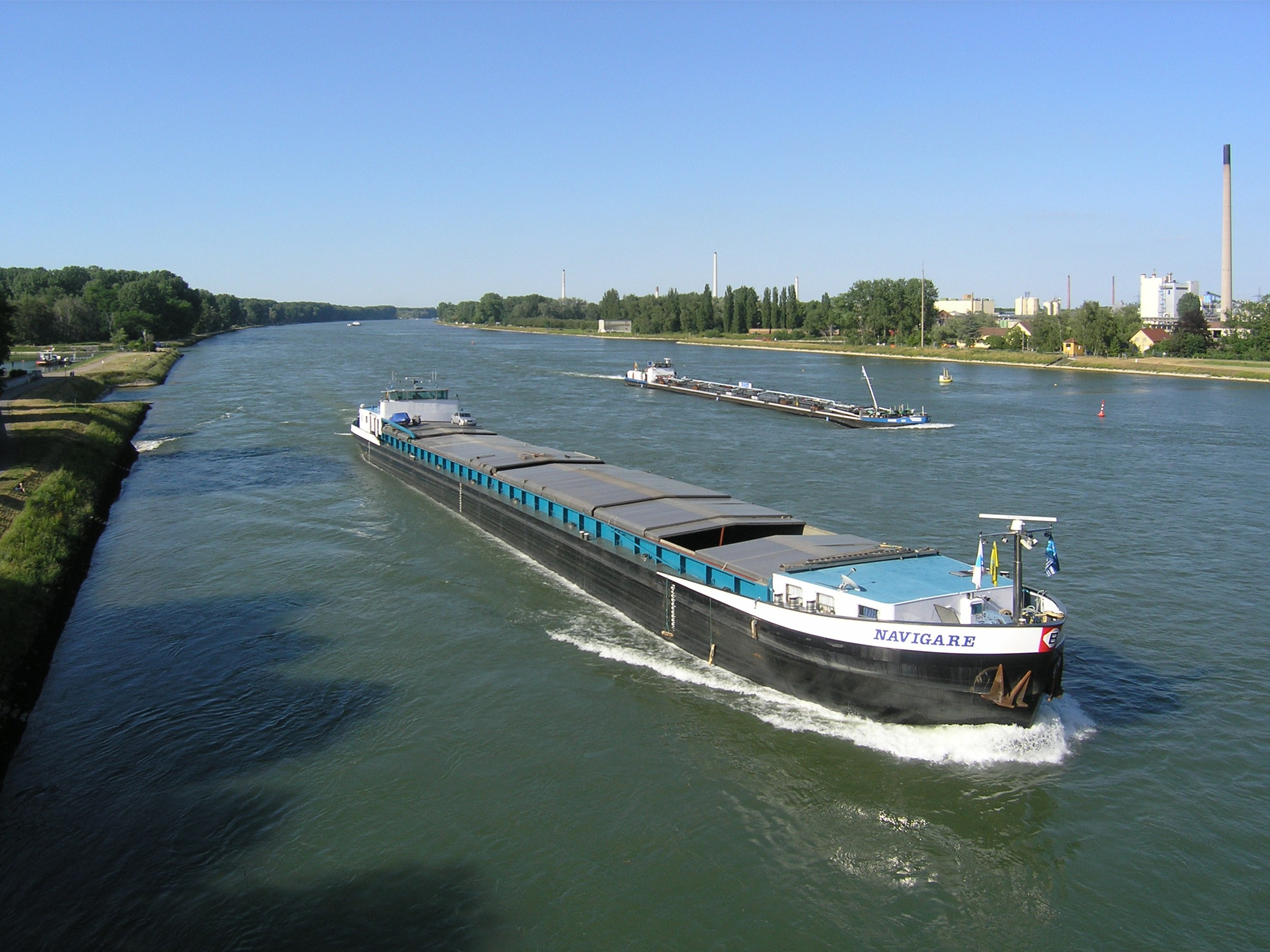
An early large channelization was performed by Johann Gottfried Tulla on the Upper Rhine

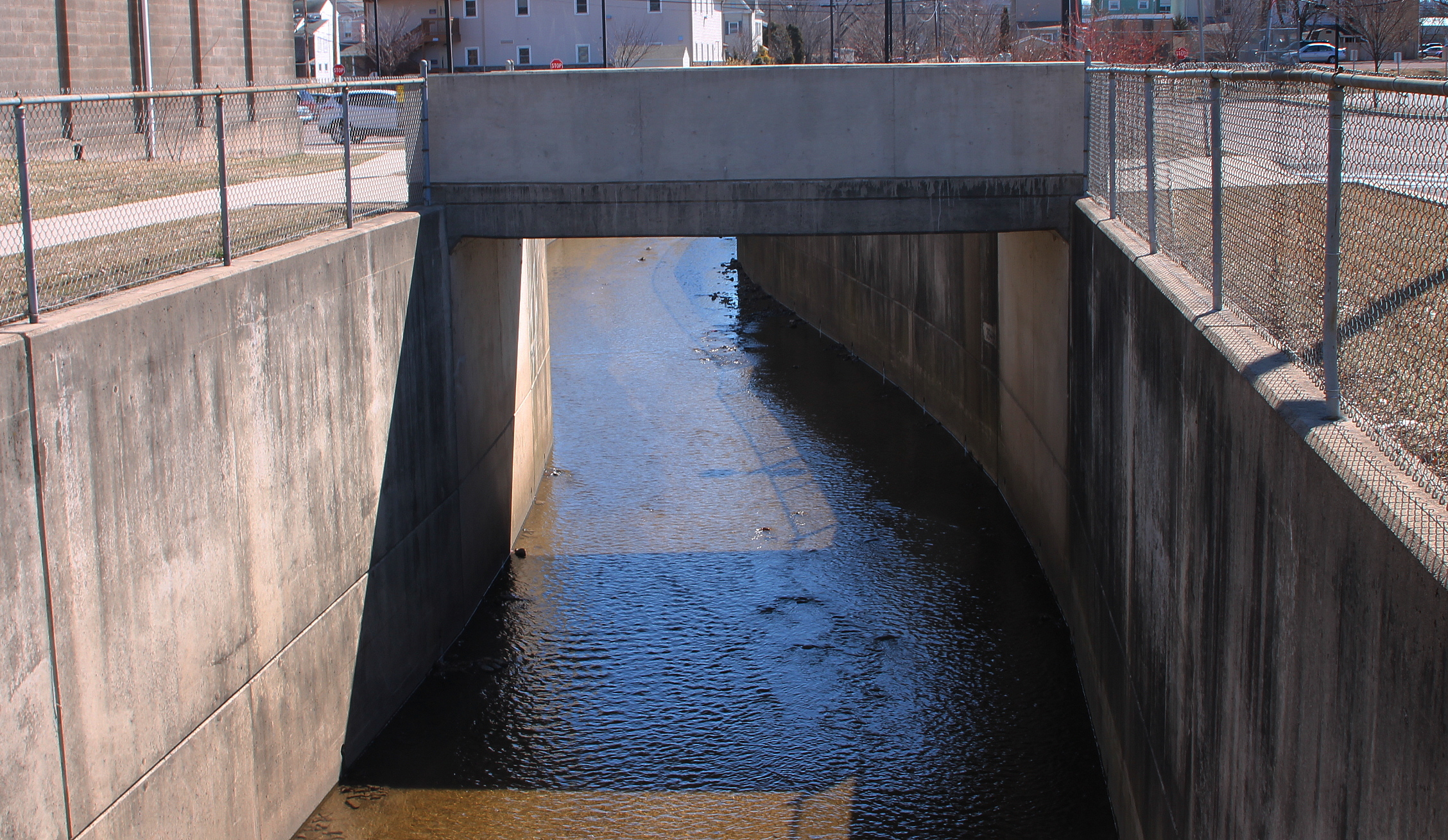
Channelized stream (Sechler Run) in Danville, Pennsylvania

The removal of obstructions, natural or artificial (e.g., trunks of trees, boulders and accumulations of gravel) from a river bed furnishes a simple and efficient means of increasing the discharging capacity of its channel. Such removals will consequently lower the height of floods upstream. Every impediment to the flow, in proportion to its extent, raises the level of the river above it so as to produce the additional artificial fall necessary to convey the flow through the restricted channel, thereby reducing the total available fall.

Reducing the length of the channel by substituting straight cuts for a winding course is the only way in which the effective fall can be increased. This involves some loss of capacity in the channel as a whole, and in the case of a large river with a considerable flow it is difficult to maintain a straight cut owing to the tendency of the current to erode the banks and form again a sinuous channel. Even if the cut is preserved by protecting the banks, it is liable to produce changes shoals and raise the flood-level in the channel just below its termination. Nevertheless, where the available fall is exceptionally small, as in land originally reclaimed from the sea, such as the English Fenlands, and where, in consequence, the drainage is in a great measure artificial, straight channels have been formed for the rivers. Because of the perceived value in protecting these fertile, low-lying lands from inundation, additional straight channels have also been provided for the discharge of rainfall, known as drains in the fens. Even extensive modification of the course of a river combined with an enlargement of its channel often produces only a limited reduction in flood damage. Consequently, such floodworks are only commensurate with the expenditure involved where significant assets (such as a town) are under threat. Additionally, even when successful, such floodworks may simply move the problem further downstream and threaten some other town. Recent floodworks in Europe have included restoration of natural floodplains and winding courses, so that floodwater is held back and released more slowly.

Human intervention sometimes inadvertently modifies the course or characteristics of a river, for example by introducing obstructions such as mining refuse, sluice gates for mills, fish-traps, unduly wide piers for bridges and solid weirs. By impeding flow these measures can raise the flood-level upstream. Regulations for the management of rivers may include stringent prohibitions with regard to pollution, requirements for enlarging sluice-ways and the compulsory raising of their gates for the passage of floods, the removal of fish traps, which are frequently blocked up by leaves and floating rubbish, reduction in the number and width of bridge piers when rebuilt, and the substitution of movable weirs for solid weirs.

By installing gauges in a fairly large river and its tributaries at suitable points, and keeping continuous records for some time of the heights of the water at the various stations, the rise of the floods in the different tributaries, the periods they take in passing down to definite stations on the main river, and the influence they severally exercise on the height of the floods at these places, can be ascertained. With the help of these records, and by observing the times and heights of the maximum rise of a particular flood at the stations on the various tributaries, the time of arrival and height of the top of the flood at any station on the main river can be predicted with remarkable accuracy two or more days beforehand. By communicating these particulars about a high flood to places on the lower river, weir-keepers are enabled to fully open the movable weirs beforehand to permit the passage of the flood, and riparian inhabitants receive timely warning of the impending inundation.

Where portions of a riverside town are situated below the maximum flood-level, or when it is important to protect land adjoining a river from inundations, the overflow of the river must be diverted into a flood-dam or confined within continuous embankments on both sides. By placing these embankments somewhat back from the margin of the river-bed, a wide flood-channel is provided for the discharge of the river as soon as it overflows its banks, while leaving the natural channel unaltered for the ordinary flow. Low embankments may be sufficient where only exceptional summer floods have to be excluded from meadows. Occasionally the embankments are raised high enough to retain the floods during most years, while provision is made for the escape of the rare, exceptionally high floods at special places in the embankments, where the scour of the issuing current is guarded against, and the inundation of the neighboring land is least injurious. In this manner, the increased cost of embankments raised above the highest flood-level of rare occurrence is avoided, as is the danger of breaches in the banks from an unusually high flood-rise and rapid flow, with their disastrous effects.

== Embankments ==
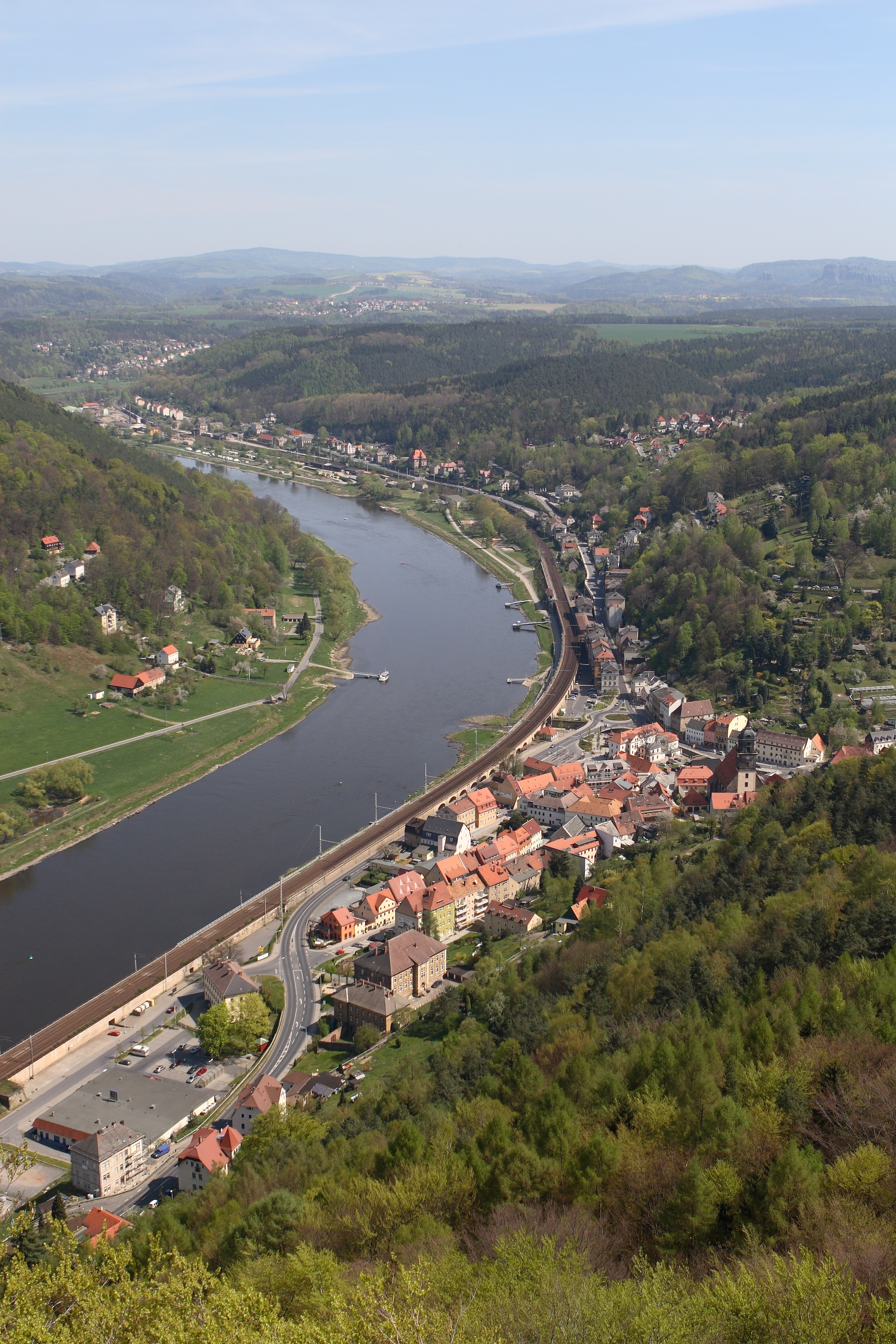
The Elbe near Königstein Fortress in Germany

A most serious objection to the formation of continuous, high embankments along rivers bringing down considerable quantities of detritus, especially near a place where their fall has been abruptly reduced by descending from mountain slopes onto alluvial plains, is the danger of their bed being raised by deposit, producing a rise in the flood-level, and necessitating a raising of the embankments if inundations are to be prevented. Longitudinal sections of the Po River, taken in 1874 and 1901, show that its bed was materially raised during this period from the confluence of the Ticino to below Caranella, despite the clearance of sediment effected by the rush through breaches. Therefore, the completion of the embankments, together with their raising, would only eventually aggravate the injuries of the inundations they have been designed to prevent, as the escape of floods from the raised river must occur sooner or later.

Inadequate planning controls which have permitted development on floodplains have been blamed for the flooding of domestic properties. Channelization was done under the auspices or overall direction of engineers employed by the local authority or the national government. One of the most heavily channelized areas in the United States is West Tennessee, where every major stream with one exception (the Hatchie River) has been partially or completely channelized.

Channelization of a stream may be undertaken for several reasons. One is to make a stream more suitable for navigation or for navigation by larger vessels with deep draughts. Another is to restrict water to a certain area of a stream's natural bottom lands so that the bulk of such lands can be made available for agriculture. A third reason is flood control, with the idea of giving a stream a sufficiently large and deep channel so that flooding beyond those limits will be minimal or nonexistent, at least on a routine basis. One major reason is to reduce natural erosion; as a natural waterway curves back and forth, it usually deposits sand and gravel on the inside of the corners where the water flows slowly, and cuts sand, gravel, subsoil, and precious topsoil from the outside corners where it flows rapidly due to a change in direction. Unlike sand and gravel, the topsoil that is eroded does not get deposited on the inside of the next corner of the river. It simply washes away.

== Loss of wetlands ==
Channelization has several predictable and negative effects. One of them is loss of wetlands. Wetlands are an excellent habitat for multiple forms of wildlife, and additionally serve as a "filter" for much of the world's surface fresh water. Another is the fact that channelized streams are almost invariably straightened. For example, the channelization of Florida's Kissimmee River has been cited as a cause contributing to the loss of wetlands. This straightening causes the streams to flow more rapidly, which can, in some instances, vastly increase soil erosion. It can also increase flooding downstream from the channelized area, as larger volumes of water traveling more rapidly than normal can reach choke points over a shorter period of time than they otherwise would, with a net effect of flood control in one area coming at the expense of aggravated flooding in another. In addition, studies have shown that stream channelization results in declines of river fish populations.

A 1971 study of the Chariton River in northern Missouri, United States, found that the channelized section of the river contained only 13 species of fish, whereas the natural segment of the stream was home to 21 species of fish. The biomass of fish able to be caught in the dredged segments of the river was 80 percent less than in the natural parts of the same stream. This loss of fish diversity and abundance is thought to occur because of reduction in habitat, elimination of riffles and pools, greater fluctuation of stream levels and water temperature, and shifting substrates. The rate of recovery for a stream once it has been dredged is extremely slow, with multiple streams showing no significant recovery 30 to 40 years after the date of channelization.

== Modern policy in the United States ==
For the reasons cited above, in recent years stream channelization has been curtailed in the U.S., and in some instances even partially reversed. In 1990 the United States Government published a "no net loss of wetlands" policy, whereby a stream channelization project in one place must be offset by the creation of new wetlands in another, a process known as "mitigation."

The major agency involved in the enforcement of this policy is the same Army Corps of Engineers, which for a number of years was the primary promoter of wide-scale channelization. Often, in the instances where channelization is permitted, boulders may be installed in the bed of the new channel so that water velocity is slowed, and channels may be deliberately curved as well. In 1990 the U.S. Congress gave the Army Corps a specific mandate to include environmental protection in its mission, and in 1996 it authorized the Corps to undertake restoration projects. The U.S. Clean Water Act regulates certain aspects of channelization by requiring non-Federal entities (i.e. state and local governments, private parties) to obtain permits for dredging and filling operations. Permits are issued by the Army Corps with EPA participation.

== Types of river canalization ==
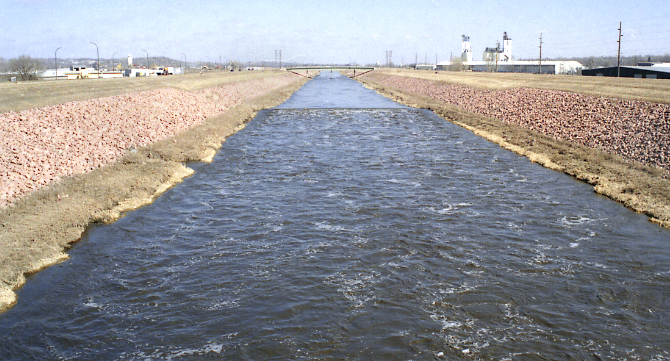
A channelized section of the Floyd River in Sioux City, Iowa

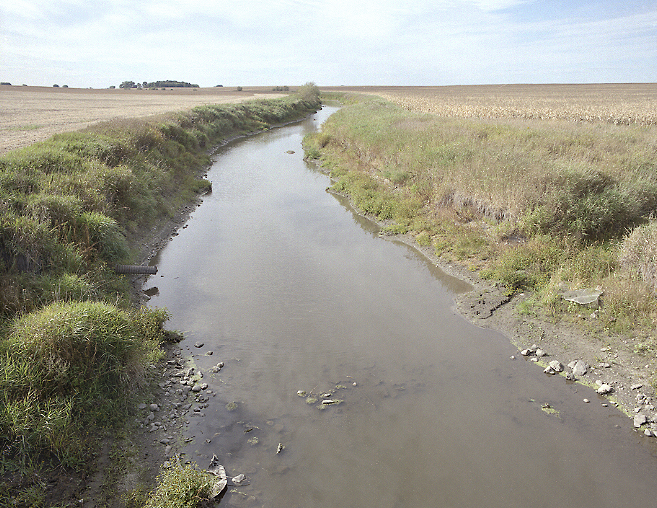
A channelized section of the South Fork of the Crow River in Meeker County, Minnesota

Rivers whose discharge is liable to become quite small at their low stage, or which have a somewhat large fall, as is usual in the upper part of rivers, cannot be given an adequate depth for navigation purely by works which regulate the flow; their ordinary summer level has to be raised by impounding the flow with weirs at intervals across the channel, while a lock has to be provided alongside the weir, or in a side channel, to provide for the passage of vessels. A river is thereby converted into a succession of fairly level reaches rising in steps up-stream, providing still-water navigation comparable to a canal; but it differs from a canal in the introduction of weirs for keeping up the water-level, in the provision for the regular discharge of the river at the weirs, and in the two sills of the locks being laid at the same level instead of the upper sill being raised above the lower one to the extent of the rise at the lock, as usual on canals.

Canalization secures a definite available depth for navigation; and the discharge of the river generally is amply sufficient for maintaining the impounded water level, as well as providing the necessary water for locking. Navigation, however, is liable to be stopped during the descent of high floods, which in a number of cases rise above the locks; and it is necessarily arrested in cold climates on all rivers by long, severe frosts, and especially by ice. Multiple small rivers, like the Thames above its tidal limit, have been rendered navigable by canalization, and several fairly large rivers have thereby provided a good depth for vessels for considerable distances inland. Thus the canalized Seine has secured a navigable depth of 10 1/2 feet (3.2 metres) from its tidal limit up to Paris, a distance of 135 miles, and a depth of 6 3/4 feet (2.06 metres) up to Montereau, 62 miles higher up.

== River regulation works ==
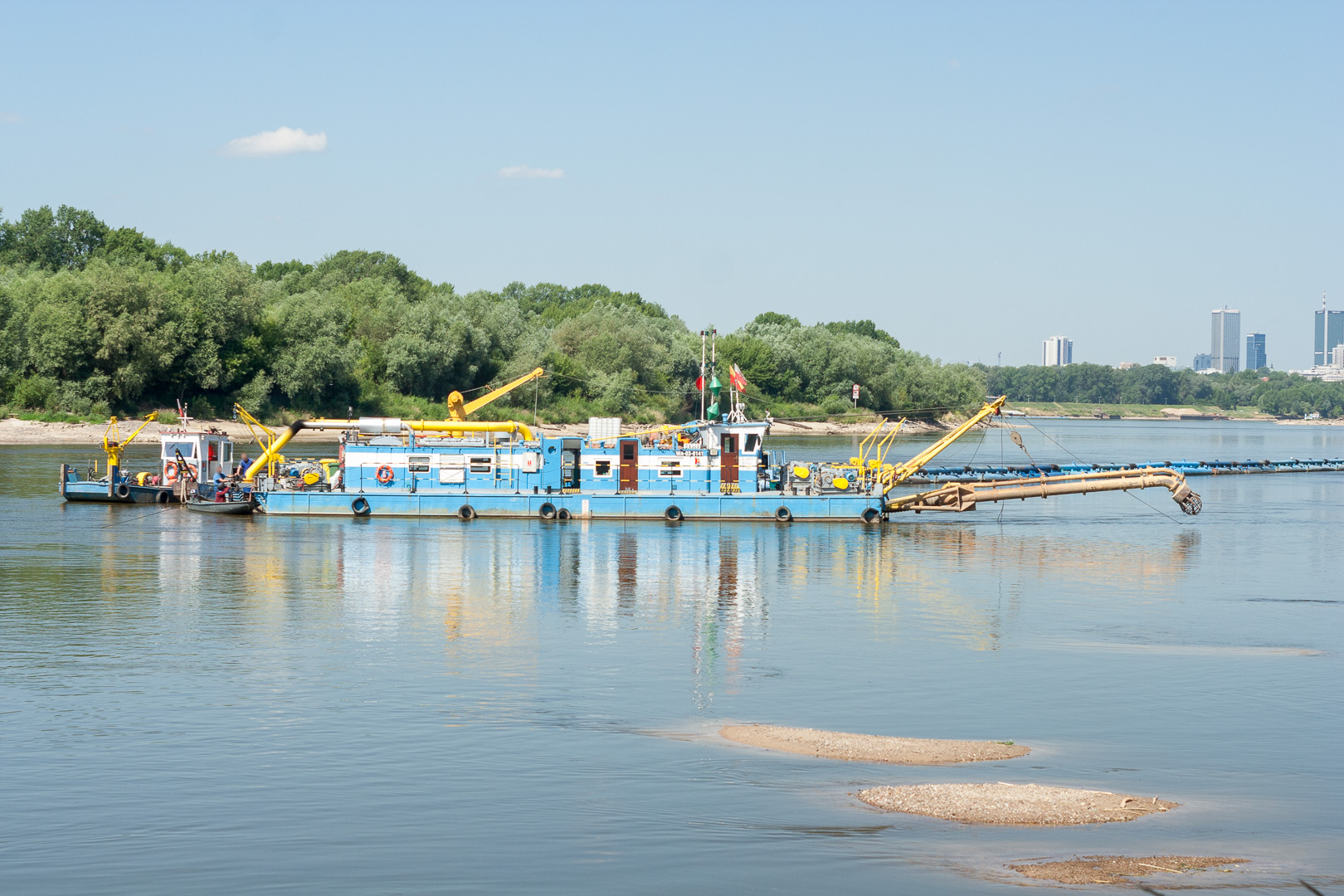
A suction dredge barge on the Vistula River, Warsaw, Poland

As rivers flow onward towards the sea, they experience a considerable diminution in their fall, and a progressive increase in the basin which they drain, owing to the successive influx of their various tributaries. Thus, their current gradually becomes more gentle and their discharge larger in volume and less subject to abrupt variations; and, consequently, they become more suitable for navigation. Eventually, large rivers, under favorable conditions, often furnish important natural highways for inland navigation in the lower portion of their course, as, for instance, the Rhine, the Danube and the Mississippi. River engineering works are only required to prevent changes in the course of the stream, to regulate its depth, and especially to fix the low-water channel and concentrate the flow in it, so as to increase as far as practicable the navigable depth at the lowest stage of the water level.

Engineering works to increase the navigability of rivers can only be advantageously undertaken in large rivers with a moderate fall and a fair discharge at their lowest stage, for with a large fall the current presents a great impediment to up-stream navigation, and there are generally variations in water level, and when the discharge becomes small in the dry season. It is impossible to maintain a sufficient depth of water in the low-water channel.

The possibility to secure uniformity of depth in a river by lowering the shoals obstructing the channel depends on the nature of the shoals. A soft shoal in the bed of a river is due to deposit from a diminution in velocity of flow, produced by a reduction in fall and by a widening of the channel, or to a loss in concentration of the scour of the main current in passing over from one concave bank to the next on the opposite side. The lowering of such a shoal by dredging merely effects a temporary deepening, for it soon forms again from the causes which produced it. The removal, moreover, of the rocky obstructions at rapids, though increasing the depth and equalizing the flow at these places, produces a lowering of the river above the rapids by facilitating the efflux, which may result in the appearance of fresh shoals at the low stage of the river. Where, however, narrow rocky reefs or other hard shoals stretch across the bottom of a river and present obstacles to the erosion by the current of the soft materials forming the bed of the river above and below, their removal may result in permanent improvement by enabling the river to deepen its bed by natural scour.

The capability of a river to provide a waterway for navigation during the summer or throughout the dry season depends on the depth that can be secured in the channel at the lowest stage. The problem in the dry season is the small discharge and deficiency in scour during this period. A typical solution is to restrict the width of the low-water channel, concentrate all of the flow in it, and also to fix its position so that it is scoured out every year by the floods which follow the deepest part of the bed along the line of the strongest current. This can be effected by closing subsidiary low-water channels with dikes across them, and narrowing the channel at the low stage by low-dipping cross dikes extending from the river banks down the slope and pointing slightly up-stream so as to direct the water flowing over them into a central channel.

== Estuarine works ==
The needs of navigation may also require that a stable, continuous, navigable channel is prolonged from the navigable river to deep water at the mouth of the estuary. The interaction of river flow and tide needs to be modeled by computer or using scale models, moulded to the configuration of the estuary under consideration and reproducing in miniature the tidal ebb and flow and fresh-water discharge over a bed of fine sand, in which various lines of training walls can be successively inserted. The models should be capable of furnishing valuable indications of the respective effects and comparative merits of the different schemes proposed for works.

== See also ==
- Bridge scour
- Flood control
