= Nathaniel Lande =

Canadian journalist, author and filmmaker

- Born: Canada
- Education: Avon Old Farms School, Duke University, Trinity College Dublin
- Occupation(s): Author, filmmaker, journalist, professor, inventor
- Spouse: Natalya Chamkina
- Children: Andrew Lande

Nathaniel Lande is a Canadian journalist, author, and filmmaker. He studied at Duke University and Trinity College Dublin, where he earned his doctorate in 1992. He is the author of several books, including Cricket, A Novel (1982), and Dispatches from the Front: A History of the American War Correspondent (1996). He worked at Time Inc.

Lande holds two patents. His novel, While The Music Played, was released in May 2020 by Blackstone Publishing.

== Education ==
Lande attended Avon Old Farms School and Duke University. He earned his PhD at Trinity College Dublin in 1992. He has held teaching appointments at the University of North Carolina at Chapel Hill School of Journalism, the Fuqua School of Business at Duke University, and Trinity College Dublin.

== Career ==
Lande's career has included work in publishing, television, and film. He was Creative Director for the Magazine Group at Time Inc., Director of Time World News Service, a founding director of Time-Life Films, and an executive producer for CBS and NBC. He also produced and directed films for CBS Cinema Center Films and Universal MCA.

According to Lande, he began his career at CBS in the mailroom and was selected by Michael Dann and William Paley to work for the head of Programming. He then joined the producing staff of PM East, hosted by Mike Wallace, working with Peter Lassally. He states that while working on PM East, he helped discover Woody Allen and Barbra Streisand.

As Creative Director at Time Inc., Lande developed presentations for magazine publishers, including musical revues. These included All About Life, One for the Money, and 10 the Musical, for Life, Money, and People magazines, respectively. As Director of Time World News Service, he wrote and produced over 800 radio broadcasts. Lande wrote, produced, and directed films and documentaries at Time Inc., including Montage and Window on the World, which won awards. He also served as a White House aide, producing events including Salute to Congress and Sing Along with Millard Fillmore.

Lande's book Cricket is partly autobiographical. His other books include The 10 Best of Everything and Dispatches from the Front. His novel, The Life and Times of Homer Sincere, Whose Amazing Adventures are Documented by his True and Trusted Friend Rigby Canfield, was released by Overlook Press in May 2010. His latest book is While The Music Played (2020).

== Bibliography ==
- Mindstyles-Lifestyles, Price Stern Sloan
- The Emotional Maintenance Manual, Rawson and Wade
- The Morality and Responsibility of the Press, Time Inc.
- Self Health, The Life Long Fitness Book, Holt, Rinehardt, Winston
- Stages, Understanding How You Make Moral Decisions, Harper Collins
- Cricket, A Novel, New American Library
- Blueprinting, HarperCollins
- Dispatches from the Front: A History of the American War Correspondent, Henry Holt.
- Trade Paperback, Oxford University Press
- The Cigar Connoisseur, Clarkson Potter
- The Ten Best of Everything: Passport to the Best, An Ultimate Guide for Traveler, National Geographic Books
- The Life and Times of Homer Sincere, Whose Amazing Adventures are Documented by his True and Trusted Friend Rigby Canfield, Overlook Press
- While The Music Played, Blackstone Publishing
- Spinning History: Politics and Propaganda in World War II, Skyhorse Publishing, Inc
