= Lake Blanchemer =

Lake in France

Lac de Blanchemer
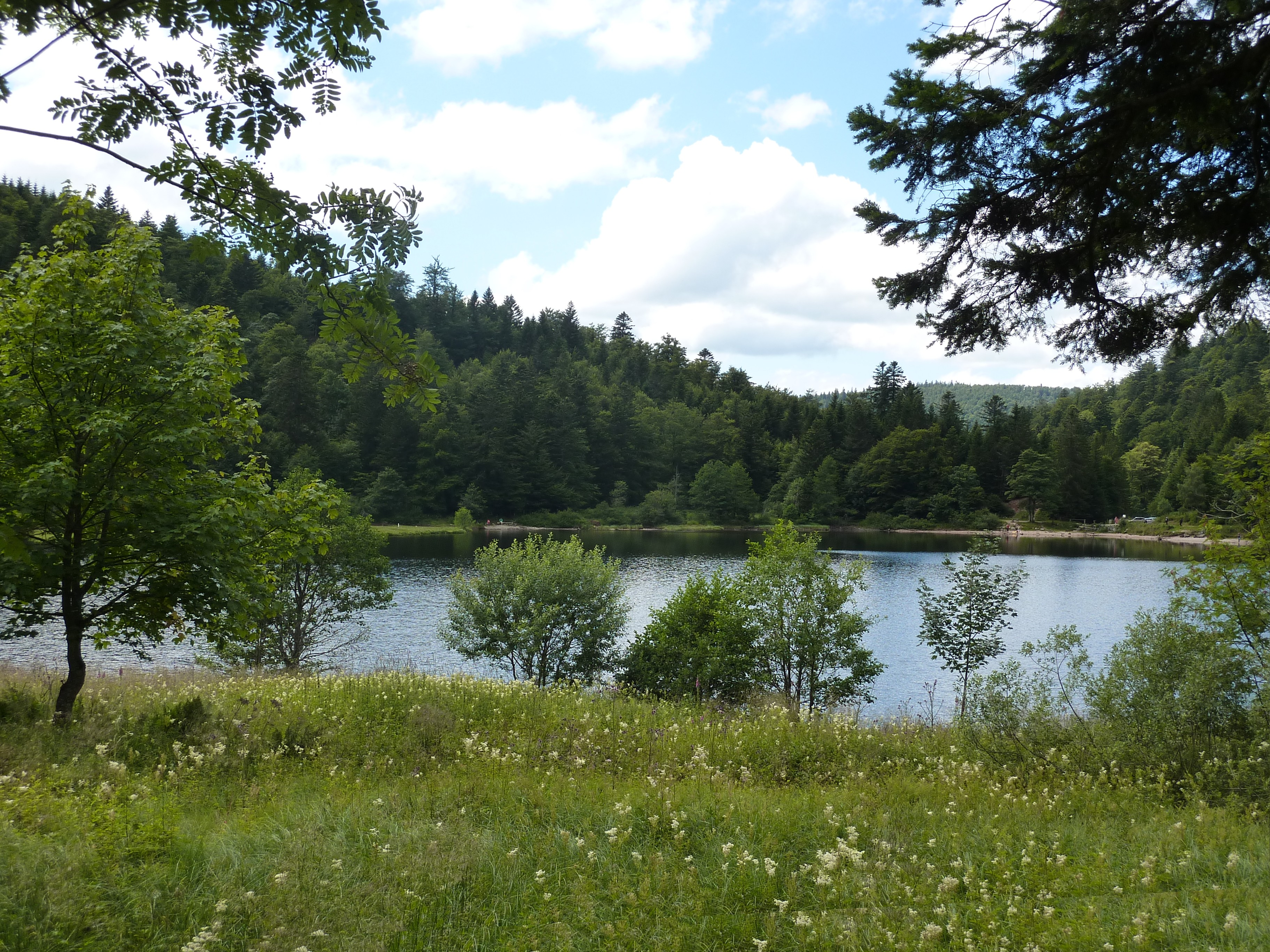

- Location within France
- Location: La Bresse, Vosges
- Coordinates: 48°1′5″N 6°58′32″E
- Type: glacial
- Primary outflows: Ruisseau de Blanchemer
- Basin countries: France
- Max. length: 350 m (1,150 ft)
- Max. width: 250 m (820 ft)
- Surface area: 9 ha (22 acres)
- Max. depth: 15 m (49 ft)
- Surface elevation: 984 m (3,228 ft)

Lac de Blanchemer is a lake at La Bresse in Vosges, France.

== Electricity production ==
In 1959, a hydroelectric power plant was built below the lake by the Municipal Authority of Electricity. It was used to produce electricity for residents of La Bresse.
