= Lande (surname) =

Lande or Landé is a surname. Notable people with the surname include:

- Alfred Landé (1888–1976), German/American quantum physicist
- Even Torkildsen Lande (1758–1833), Norwegian politician
- Jean-Baptiste Landé (died 1748), French ballet dancer, active in Sweden, Denmark and Russia
- Jørn Lande (born 1968), Norwegian heavy rock singer
- Nathaniel Lande, author and filmmaker
- Russell Lande (born 1951), American evolutionary biologist
