= Lac de Lispach =

Lake in Vosges, France

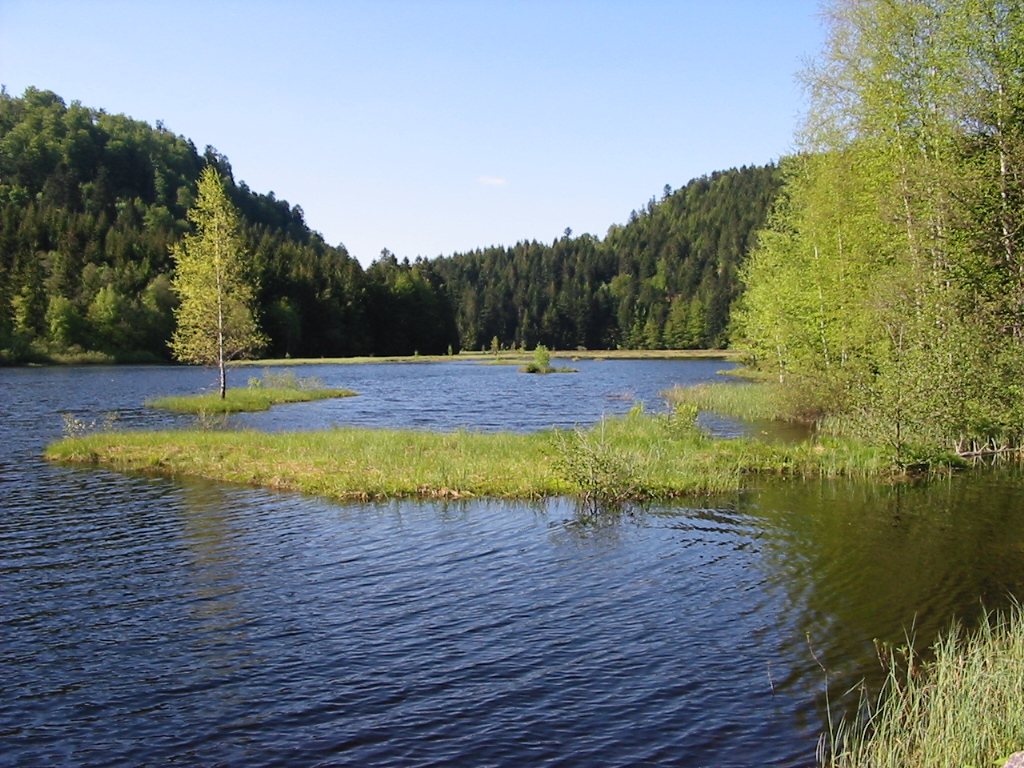

- Location within France
- Location: Vosges
- Coordinates: 48°03′06″N 06°56′32″E
- Primary outflows: Chajoux
- Basin countries: France
- Surface area: 0.12 km^{2} (0.046 sq mi)
- Max. depth: 9 m (30 ft)
- Surface elevation: 909 m (2,982 ft)

Lac de Lispach is a lake in the commune of La Bresse, Vosges department, France, popular for walks. At an elevation of 909 m in the Vosges mountains, its surface area is 0.12 km^{2}.
