= Bouchot (surname) =

Bouchot is a surname. Notable people with the surname include:

- François Bouchot (1800–1842), French painter and engraver
- Henri Bouchot (1849–1906), French historian
- Louis-Jules Bouchot (1817–1907), French architect
- Rosita Bouchot (born 1951), Mexican actress and singer
- Vincent Bouchot (born 1966), French composer and musicologist
