= Lac des Corbeaux =

Lake in Vosges, France

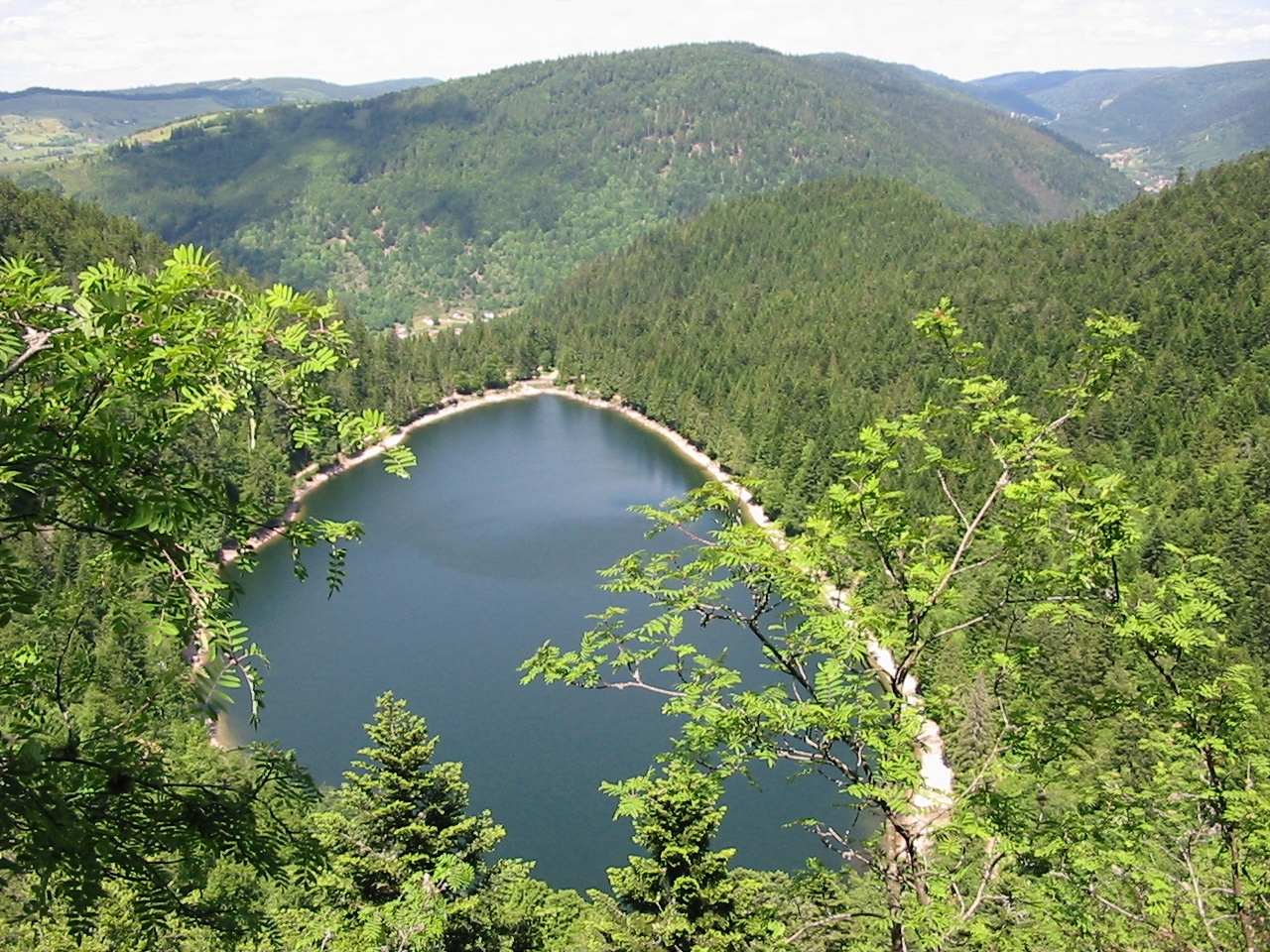

- Location within France
- Location: Vosges
- Coordinates: 47°59′35″N 06°54′21″E
- Type: glacial
- Basin countries: France
- Surface area: 0.091 km^{2} (0.035 sq mi)
- Max. depth: 23 m (75 ft)
- Water volume: 420,000 m^{3} (15,000,000 cu ft)
- Surface elevation: 900 m (3,000 ft)

Lac des Corbeaux is a lake near La Bresse, in Vosges, France. At an elevation of 900 metres (3,000 ft), its surface area is 9.1 hectares (0.091 km^{2}; 0.035 sq mi).
