= Lande, Østfold =

Borough in Østfold county, Norway

Coordinates: 59.295°N 11.100°E

Lande is a borough in Østfold county, Norway, located close to the lake Tunevannet and east of E6, which is the national highway going through Sarpsborg.

== History ==
Lande comes out of the Old Norse name Landir; and it means "lands".

== Sports ==
Lande has a local football club that are called Lande IF, which are playing within the 7th division of the Norwegian football league system.

== Famous people ==
The Norwegian actor Nils Ole Oftebro was born and raised in Lande.

== Schools ==
There is also an elementary school and junior high school located in Lande, which is called Lande School.
