= Lac de la Lande =

Lake in France

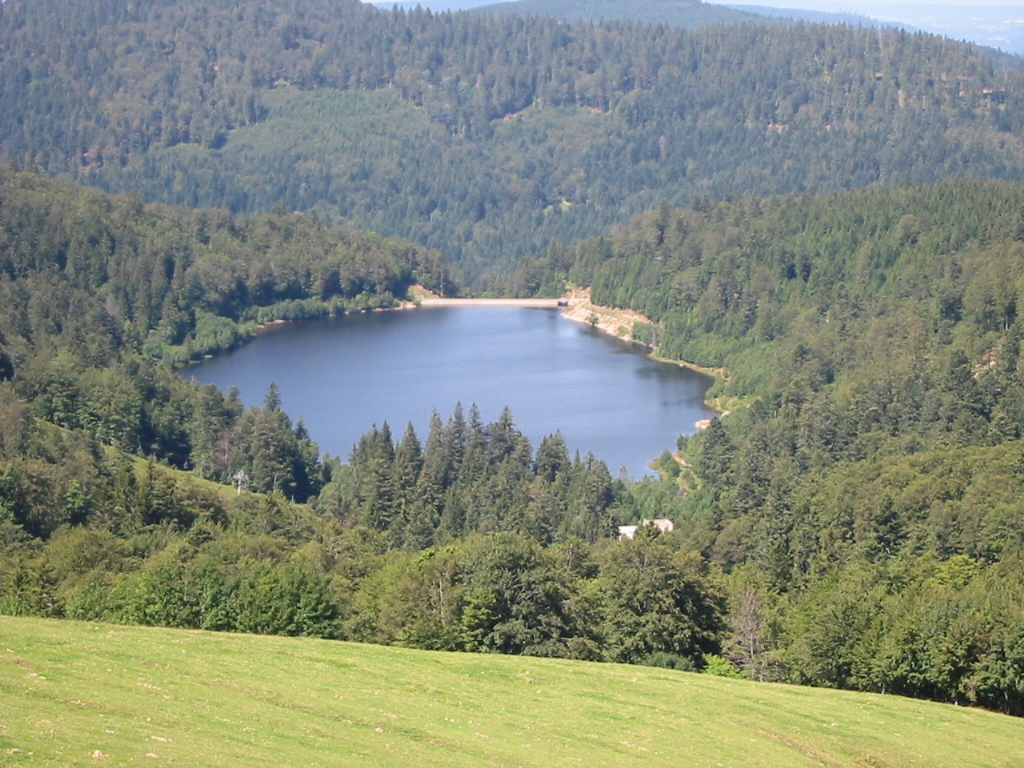

- Location within France
- Location: Vosges
- Coordinates: 48°02′00″N 06°58′43″E
- Type: artificial
- Primary inflows: Moselotte
- Primary outflows: Moselotte
- Basin countries: France
- Surface area: 105,000 m^{2} (10.5 ha; 26 acres)
- Max. depth: 17 m (56 ft)
- Water volume: 660,000 m^{3} (540 acre⋅ft)

Lac de la Lande is a lake in Vosges, France.

Water is extracted from the lake to supply snow cannons at the local ski resort.
