= Hauconcourt =

- Commune
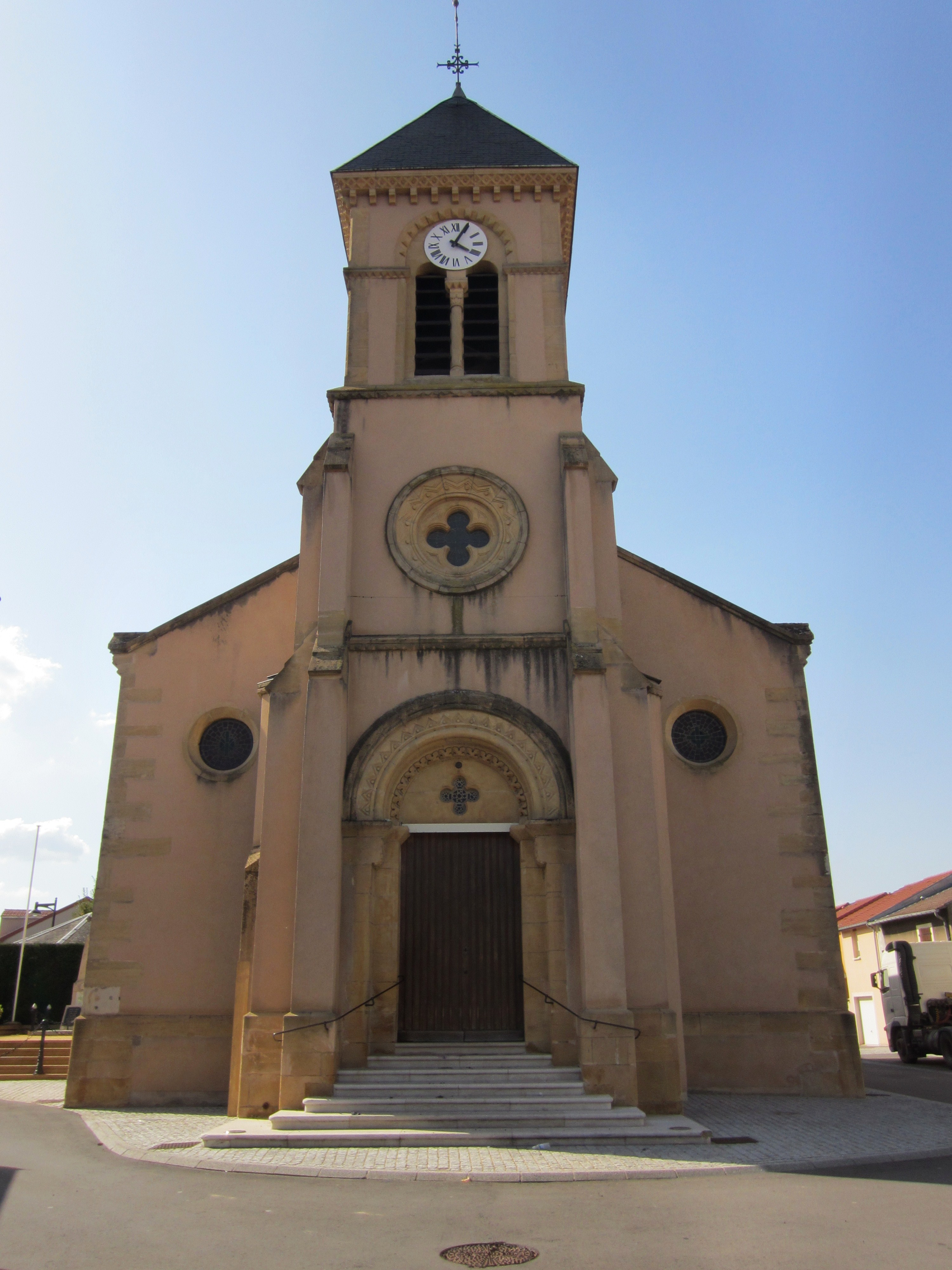
- The church in Hauconcourt

- Coat of arms
- Location of Hauconcourt
- Location within France Location within Grand Est
- Coordinates: 49°13′12″N 6°11′25″E
- Country: France
- Region: Grand Est
- Department: Moselle
- Arrondissement: Metz
- Canton: Le Sillon Mosellan
- Intercommunality: CC Rives de Moselle

Government
  - Mayor (2020–2026): Philippe Wagner
- Area^{1}: 7.9 km^{2} (3.1 sq mi)
- Elevation: 100 m (330 ft)
- Highest elevation: 166 m (545 ft)
- Lowest elevation: 155 m (509 ft)
- Population (2023): 579
  - Density: 73/km^{2} (190/sq mi)
- Time zone: UTC+01:00 (CET)
  - Summer (DST): UTC+02:00 (CEST)
- INSEE/Postal code: 57303 /57280
- ^{1} French Land Register data, which excludes lakes, ponds, glaciers > 1 km^{2} (0.386 sq mi or 247 acres) and river estuaries.

Hauconcourt (French pronunciation: [okɔ̃kuʁ]; German: Halkenhofen) is a commune in the Moselle department in Grand Est in north-eastern France.

== See also ==
- Communes of the Moselle department
