= Runoff curve number =

Parameter used in hydrology

The runoff curve number (also called a curve number or simply CN) is an empirical parameter used in hydrology for predicting direct runoff or infiltration from rainfall excess. The curve number method was developed by the USDA Natural Resources Conservation Service, which was formerly called the Soil Conservation Service or SCS—the number is still popularly known as a "SCS runoff curve number" in the literature. The runoff curve number was developed from an empirical analysis of runoff from small catchments and hillslope plots monitored by the USDA. It is widely used and is an efficient method for determining the approximate amount of direct runoff from a rainfall event in a particular area.

== Definition ==
The runoff curve number is based on the area's hydrologic soil group, land use, treatment and hydrologic condition. References, such as from USDA indicate the runoff curve numbers for characteristic land cover descriptions and a hydrologic soil group.

The runoff equation is:

$$Q=\begin{cases}
0 & \text{for } P \leq I_a \\
\frac{(P-I_a)^2}{{P-I_a}+S} & \text{for } P>I_a \end{cases}$$

where

$Q$ is runoff ([L]; in)
$P$ is rainfall ([L]; in)
$S$ is the potential maximum soil moisture retention after runoff begins ([L]; in)
$I_a$ is the initial abstraction ([L]; in), or the amount of water before runoff, such as infiltration, or rainfall interception by vegetation; historically, it has generally been assumed that $I_a = 0.2S$, although more recent research has found that $I_a = 0.05S$ may be a more appropriate relationship in urbanized watersheds where the CN is updated to reflect developed conditions.

The runoff curve number, $CN$, is then related

$$S = \frac{1000}{CN} - 10$$

$CN$ has a range from 30 to 100; lower numbers indicate low runoff potential while larger numbers are for increasing runoff potential. The lower the curve number, the more permeable the soil is. As can be seen in the curve number equation, runoff cannot begin until the initial abstraction has been met. The curve number methodology is an event-based calculation, and should not be used for a single annual rainfall value, as this will incorrectly miss the effects of antecedent moisture and the necessity of an initial abstraction threshold.

== Selection ==
The NRCS curve number is related to soil type, soil infiltration capability, land use, and the depth of the seasonal high water table. To account for different soils' ability to infiltrate, NRCS has divided soils into four hydrologic soil groups (HSGs). They are defined as follows.

- HSG Group A (low runoff potential): Soils with high infiltration rates even when thoroughly wetted. These consist chiefly of deep, well-drained sands and gravels. These soils have a high rate of water transmission (final infiltration rate greater than 0.30 in (7.6 mm) per hour).
- HSG Group B: Soils with moderate infiltration rates when thoroughly wetted. These consist chiefly of soils that are moderately deep to deep, moderately well drained to well drained with moderately fine to moderately coarse textures. These soils have a moderate rate of water transmission (final infiltration rate of 0.15–0.30 in (3.8–7.6 mm) per hour).
- HSG Group C: Soils with slow infiltration rates when thoroughly wetted. These consist chiefly of soils with a layer that impedes downward movement of water or soils with moderately fine to fine textures. These soils have a slow rate of water transmission (final infiltration rate 0.05–0.15 in (1.3–3.8 mm) per hour).
- HSG Group D (high runoff potential): Soils with very slow infiltration rates when thoroughly wetted. These consist chiefly of clay soils with a high swelling potential, soils with a permanent high water table, soils with a claypan or clay layer at or near the surface, and shallow soils over nearly impervious materials. These soils have a very slow rate of water transmission (final infiltration rate less than 0.05 in (1.3 mm) per hour).

Selection of a hydrologic soil group should be done based on measured infiltration rates, soil survey (such as the NRCS Web Soil Survey), or judgement from a qualified soil science or geotechnical professional. The table below presents curve numbers for antecedent soil moisture condition II (average moisture condition). To alter the curve number based on moisture condition or other parameters, see Adjustments.

== Values ==
Fully developed urban areas (vegetation established)
Cover description		Curve numbers for hydrologic soil group			
Cover description		A	B	C	D
Open space (lawns, parks, golf courses, cemeteries, etc.)	Poor condition (grass cover <50%)	68	79	86	89
Open space (lawns, parks, golf courses, cemeteries, etc.)	Fair condition (grass cover 50 to 75%)	49	69	79	84
Open space (lawns, parks, golf courses, cemeteries, etc.)	Good condition (grass cover >75%)	39	61	74	80
Impervious areas	Paved parking lots, roofs, driveways, etc. (excluding right of way)	98	98	98	98
Streets and roads	Paved; curbs and storm sewers (excluding right-of-way)	98	98	98	98
Streets and roads	Paved; open ditches (including right-of-way)	83	89	92	93
Streets and roads	Gravel (including right of way)	76	85	89	91
Streets and roads	Dirt (including right-of-way)	72	82	87	89
Western desert urban areas	Natural desert landscaping (pervious area only)	63	77	85	88
Western desert urban areas	Artificial desert landscaping (impervious weed barrier, desert shrub with 1- to 2-inch sand or gravel mulch and basin borders)	96	96	96	96
Urban districts	Commercial and business (85% imp.)	89	92	94	95
Urban districts	Industrial (72% imp.)	81	88	91	93
Residential districts by average lot size	1/8 acre or less (town houses) (65% imp.)	77	85	90	92
Residential districts by average lot size	1/4 acre (38% imp.)	61	75	83	87
Residential districts by average lot size	1/3 acre (30% imp.)	57	72	81	86
Residential districts by average lot size	1/2 acre (25% imp.)	54	70	80	85
Residential districts by average lot size	1 acre (20% imp.)	51	68	79	84
Residential districts by average lot size	2 acres (12% imp.)	46	65	77	82

Developing urban areas
Cover description	Curve numbers for hydrologic soil group			
Cover description	A	B	C	D
Newly graded areas (pervious areas only, no vegetation)	77	86	91	94

Cultivated agricultural lands
Cover description			Curve numbers for hydrologic soil group			
Cover type	Treatment^{[A]}	Hydrologic condition	A	B	C	D
Fallow	Bare soil	—	77	86	91	94
Fallow	Crop residue cover (CR)	Poor	76	85	90	93
Fallow	Crop residue cover (CR)	Good	74	83	88	90
Row crops	Straight row (SR)	Poor	72	81	88	91
Row crops	Straight row (SR)	Good	67	78	85	89
Row crops	SR + CR	Poor	71	80	87	90
Row crops	SR + CR	Good	64	75	82	85
Row crops	Contoured (C)	Poor	70	79	84	88
Row crops	Contoured (C)	Good	65	75	82	86
Row crops	C + CR	Poor	69	78	83	87
Row crops	C + CR	Good	64	74	81	85
Row crops	Contoured & terraced (C&T)	Poor	66	74	80	82
Row crops	Contoured & terraced (C&T)	Good	62	71	78	81
Row crops	C&T + R	Poor	65	73	79	81
Row crops	C&T + R	Good	61	70	77	80
Small grain	SR	Poor	65	76	84	88
Small grain	SR	Good	63	75	83	87
Small grain	SR + CR	Poor	64	75	83	86
Small grain	SR + CR	Good	60	72	80	84
Small grain	C	Poor	63	74	82	85
Small grain	C	Good	61	73	81	84
Small grain	C + CR	Poor	62	73	81	84
Small grain	C + CR	Good	60	72	80	83
Small grain	C&T	Poor	61	72	79	82
Small grain	C&T	Good	59	70	78	81
Small grain	C&T + R	Poor	60	71	78	81
Small grain	C&T + R	Good	58	69	77	80
Close-seeded or broadcast legumes or rotation meadow	SR	Poor	66	77	85	89
Close-seeded or broadcast legumes or rotation meadow	SR	Good	58	72	81	85
Close-seeded or broadcast legumes or rotation meadow	C	Poor	64	75	83	85
Close-seeded or broadcast legumes or rotation meadow	C	Good	55	69	78	83
Close-seeded or broadcast legumes or rotation meadow	C&T	Poor	63	73	80	83
Close-seeded or broadcast legumes or rotation meadow	C&T	Good	51	67	76	80

^{A} Crop residue cover applies only if residue is on at least 5% of the surface throughout the year.

Other agricultural lands
Cover description		Curve numbers for hydrologic soil group			
Cover type	Hydrologic condition	A	B	C	D
Pasture, grassland, or range—continuous forage for grazing.^{A}	Poor	68	79	86	89
Pasture, grassland, or range—continuous forage for grazing.^{A}	Fair	49	69	79	84
Pasture, grassland, or range—continuous forage for grazing.^{A}	Good	39	61	74	80
Meadow—continuous grass, protected from grazing and generally mowed for hay.	—	30	58	71	78
Brush—brush-weed-grass mixture with brush the major element.^{B}	Poor	48	67	77	83
Brush—brush-weed-grass mixture with brush the major element.^{B}	Fair	35	56	70	77
Brush—brush-weed-grass mixture with brush the major element.^{B}	Good	30^{C}	48	65	73
Woods—grass combination (orchard or tree farm).^{D}	Poor	57	73	82	86
Woods—grass combination (orchard or tree farm).^{D}	Fair	43	65	76	82
Woods—grass combination (orchard or tree farm).^{D}	Good	32	58	72	79
Woods.^{E}	Poor	45	66	77	83
Woods.^{E}	Fair	36	60	73	79
Woods.^{E}	Good	30	55	70	77
Farmsteads—buildings, lanes, driveways, and surrounding lots.	—	59	74	82	86

^{A} Poor: <50% ground cover or heavily grazed with no mulch; Fair: 50-75% ground cover and not heavily grazed; Good: >75% ground cover and light or only occasionally grazed.
^{B} Poor: <50% ground cover; Fair: 50-75% ground cover; Good: >75% ground cover.
^{C} Actual curve number is less than 30; use CN = 30 for runoff computation.
^{D} CN's shown were computed for areas with 50% woods and 50% grass (pasture) cover. Other combinations of conditions may be computed from the CN's for woods and pasture.
^{E} Poor: Forest litter, small trees, and brush are destroyed by heavy grazing or regular burning; Fair: Woods are grazed but not burned, and some forest litter covers the soil; Good: Woods are protected from grazing, and litter and brush adequately cover the soil.

Arid and semiarid rangelands
Cover description		Curve numbers for hydrologic soil group			
Cover type	Hydrologic condition^{A}	A^{B}	B	C	D
Herbaceuous—mixture of grass, weeds, and low-growing brush, with brush the minor element	Poor	—	80	87	93
Herbaceuous—mixture of grass, weeds, and low-growing brush, with brush the minor element	Fair	—	71	81	89
Herbaceuous—mixture of grass, weeds, and low-growing brush, with brush the minor element	Good	—	62	74	85
Oak-aspen—mountain brush mixture of oak brush, aspen, mountain mahogany, bitter brush, maple, and other brush	Poor	—	66	74	79
Oak-aspen—mountain brush mixture of oak brush, aspen, mountain mahogany, bitter brush, maple, and other brush	Fair	—	48	57	63
Oak-aspen—mountain brush mixture of oak brush, aspen, mountain mahogany, bitter brush, maple, and other brush	Good	—	30	41	48
Pinyon-juniper—pinyon, juniper, or both; grass understory	Poor	—	75	85	89
Pinyon-juniper—pinyon, juniper, or both; grass understory	Fair	—	58	73	80
Pinyon-juniper—pinyon, juniper, or both; grass understory	Good	—	41	61	71
Sagebrush with grass understory	Poor	—	67	80	85
Sagebrush with grass understory	Fair	—	51	63	70
Sagebrush with grass understory	Good	—	35	47	55
Desert shrub—major plants include saltbush, geasewood, creosotebush, blackbrush, bursage, palo verde, mesquite, and cactus.	Poor	63	77	85	88
Desert shrub—major plants include saltbush, geasewood, creosotebush, blackbrush, bursage, palo verde, mesquite, and cactus.	Fair	55	72	81	86
Desert shrub—major plants include saltbush, geasewood, creosotebush, blackbrush, bursage, palo verde, mesquite, and cactus.	Good	49	68	79	84

^{A} Poor: <30% ground cover (litter, grass, and brush overstory); Fair: 30 to 70% ground cover; Good: >70% ground cover.
^{B} Curve numbers for group A have been developed only for desert shrub.

== Adjustments ==
Runoff is affected by the soil moisture before a precipitation event, the antecedent moisture condition (AMC). A curve number, as calculated above, may also be termed AMC II or $CN_{II}$, or average soil moisture. The other moisture conditions are dry, AMC I or $CN_{I}$, and moist, AMC III or $CN_{III}$. The curve number can be adjusted by factors to $CN_{II}$, where $CN_{I}$ factors are less than 1 (reduce $CN$ and potential runoff), while $CN_{III}$ factor are greater than 1 (increase $CN$ and potential runoff). The AMC factors can be looked up in the reference table below. Find the CN value for AMC II and multiply it by the adjustment factor based on the actual AMC to determine the adjusted curve number.

Adjustments to select curve number for soil moisture conditions.
Curve Number (AMC II)	Factors to Convert Curve Number for AMC II to AMC I or III	
Curve Number (AMC II)	AMC I (dry)	AMC III (wet)
10	0.40	2.22
20	0.45	1.85
30	0.50	1.67
40	0.55	1.50
50	0.62	1.40
60	0.67	1.30
70	0.73	1.21
80	0.79	1.14
90	0.87	1.07
100	1.00	1.00

=== Initial abstraction ratio adjustment ===
The relationship $I_a = 0.2S$ was derived from the study of many small, experimental watersheds . Since the history and documentation of this relationship are relatively obscure, more recent analysis used model fitting methods to determine the ratio of $I_a$ to $S$ with hundreds of rainfall-runoff data from numerous U.S. watersheds. In the model fitting done by Hawkins et al. (2002) found that the ratio of $I_a$ to $S$ varies from storm to storm and watershed to watershed and that the assumption of $I_a/S=0.20$ is usually high. More than 90 percent of $I_a/S$ ratios were less than 0.2. Based on this study, use of $I_a/S$ ratios of 0.05 rather than the commonly used value of 0.20 would seem more appropriate. Thus, the CN runoff equation becomes:

$$Q=\begin{cases}
0 & \text{for } P \leq 0.05S \\
\frac{(P-0.05S_{0.05})^2}{P+0.95S_{0.05}} & \text{for } P>0.05S \end{cases}$$

In this equation, note that the values of $S_{0.05}$ are not the same as the one used in estimating direct runoff with an $I_a/S$ ratio of 0.20, because 5 percent of the storage is assumed to be the initial abstraction, not 20 percent. The relationship between $S_{0.05}$ and $S_{0.20}$ was obtained from model fitting results, giving the relationship:

$$S_{0.05}=1.33{S_{0.20}}^{1.15}$$

The user, then, must do the following to use the adjusted 0.05 initial abstraction ratio:

1. Use the traditional tables of curve numbers to select the value appropriate for your watershed.
2. Calculate $S_{0.20}$ using the traditional equation:$S = \frac{1000}{CN} - 10$
3. Convert this S value to $S_{0.05}$ using the relationship above.
4. Calculate the runoff depth using the CN runoff equation above (with 0.05 substituted for the initial abstraction ratio).

== See also ==
- HydroCAD a software tool for H&H modeling
- Hydrological modelling
- Runoff model (reservoir)
  - Recharge (hydrology)
