= Canton of Saulxures-sur-Moselotte =

Coordinates: 47°56′57″N 4°46′21″E

The Canton of Saulxures-sur-Moselotte is a French former canton, one of fifteen located within the arrondissement of Épinal in the Vosges département. It was disbanded following the French canton reorganisation which came into effect in March 2015. It consisted of 10 communes, which joined the canton of La Bresse in 2015. It had 18,670 inhabitants (2012).

The canton comprised the following communes:

- Basse-sur-le-Rupt
- La Bresse
- Cornimont
- Gerbamont
- Rochesson
- Sapois
- Saulxures-sur-Moselotte
- Thiéfosse
- Vagney
- Ventron
