= Basse-sur-le-Rupt =

- Commune
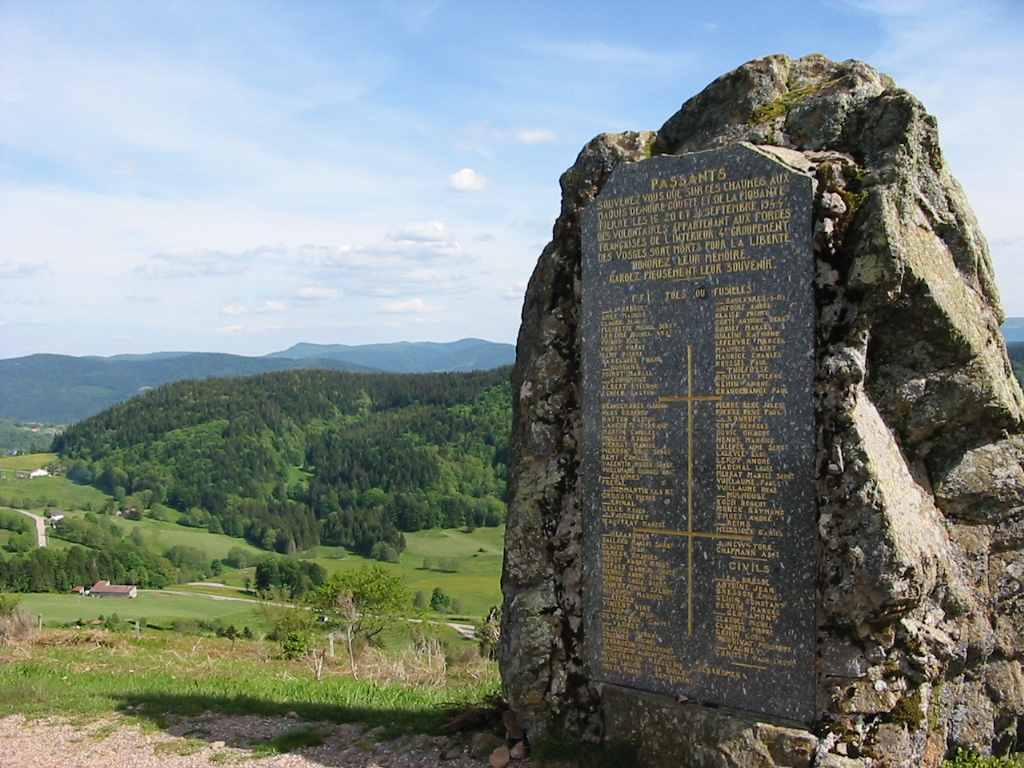
- Monument to martyrs of the Resistance at Piquante-Pierre

- Coat of arms
- Location of Basse-sur-le-Rupt
- Location within France Location within Grand Est
- Coordinates: 47°59′22″N 6°46′05″E
- Country: France
- Region: Grand Est
- Department: Vosges
- Arrondissement: Épinal
- Canton: La Bresse
- Intercommunality: CC Hautes Vosges

Government
  - Mayor (2020–2026): Nadine Perrin
- Area^{1}: 13.73 km^{2} (5.30 sq mi)
- Highest elevation: 1,060 m (3,480 ft)
- Lowest elevation: 409 m (1,342 ft)
- Population (2023): 843
  - Density: 61.4/km^{2} (159/sq mi)
- Time zone: UTC+01:00 (CET)
  - Summer (DST): UTC+02:00 (CEST)
- INSEE/Postal code: 88037 /88120
- ^{1} French Land Register data, which excludes lakes, ponds, glaciers > 1 km^{2} (0.386 sq mi or 247 acres) and river estuaries.

Basse-sur-le-Rupt (French pronunciation: [bas syʁ lə ʁy]) is a commune in the Vosges department in Grand Est in northeastern France. Its inhabitants are called Bassurois. It is a mountainous commune of seven hamlets, crossed by the river Rupt. Its landmarks include Le Haut du Roc, Le Pierre des Communes, Le Piquante Pierre and the memorial of Le Croix des Moinats. Its historical industries were textiles, sawmills and granite.

== Geography ==
Situated in fairly mountainous country, the Basse-sur-le-Rupt is laid out over approximately 10 kilometres along the départementale 34 which links Vagney with La Bresse, rising from 409 to 1060m in altitude. The commune's seven hamlets are:

- La Burotte
- Contrexard
- Planois
- Presles
- Pubas
- Trougemont
- L'Echté

== History ==
Basse-sur-le-Rupt was notable during the Second World War. Piquante Pierre, one of the highest summits in the commune, through its height and its surrounding forests provided shelter to a Maquis. This unit was destroyed on 21 September 1944 by the German army. Piquante Pierre became thereafter a memorial to the dead, commemorating the 83 maquisards who were lost.

== Demography ==
Historical population
Year	Pop.	±% p.a.
1968	778	—
1975	704	−1.42%
1982	786	+1.59%
1990	804	+0.28%
1999	819	+0.21%
2007	890	+1.04%
2012	878	−0.27%
2017	864	−0.32%
2023	843	−0.41%
Source: INSEE

== Administration ==
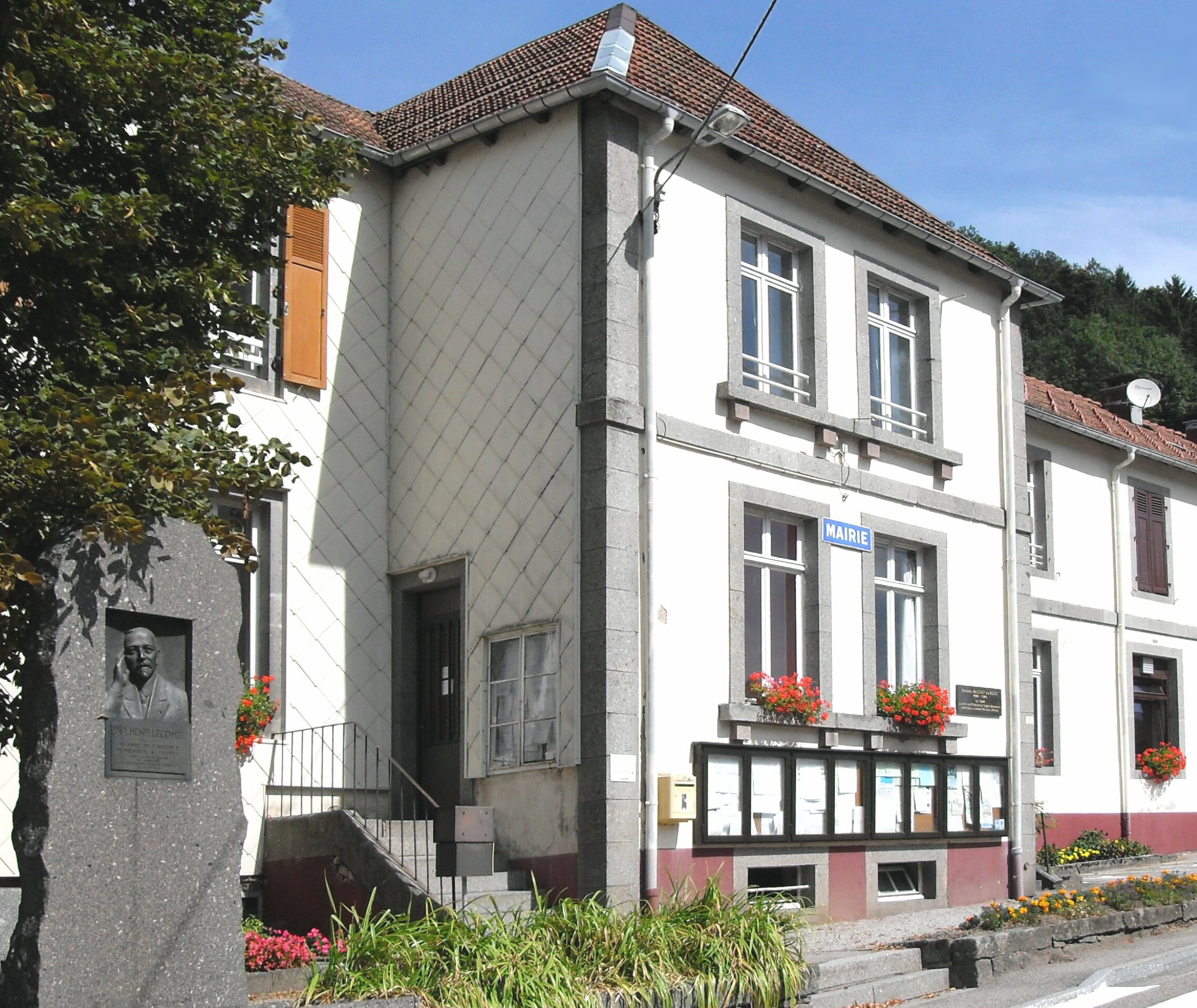
Mairie at the centre of Planois

The mayor is Nadine Perrin, re-elected in 2020.

== Monuments and notable landmarks ==
Le Haut du Roc is a high point shared with the commune of Saulxures-sur-Moselotte. It is located at 1014 metres altitude, on poudingues ("puddings", mixtures of sandstone and pebbles). On a platform which offers a wide panorama of the commune, a cross was set up in 1933.

La Pierre des Quatre Communes is a boundary stone originally found by a trail walker in the forest. It marks the communes' border with three of its neighbours, La Bresse, Cornimont and Rochesson. It is also the highest point in the commune at 1060 metres.

La Piquante Pierre is a monolith situated at 1008 metres altitude of unknown origin. It is remarkable because if one looks closely at it, it is notable that it has four faces (like the statues on Easter Island. Each face points in a cardinal direction. During the Second World War it was home to a maquis group of resistance fighters.

La Croix des Moinats is a monument to commemorate the Moroccan Goumiers who fought in the region during the Second World War. Their battalions, known as tabors, comprised 12000 soldiers, paid a heavy price of 9000 killed or wounded.

L'église Saint-Nicolas

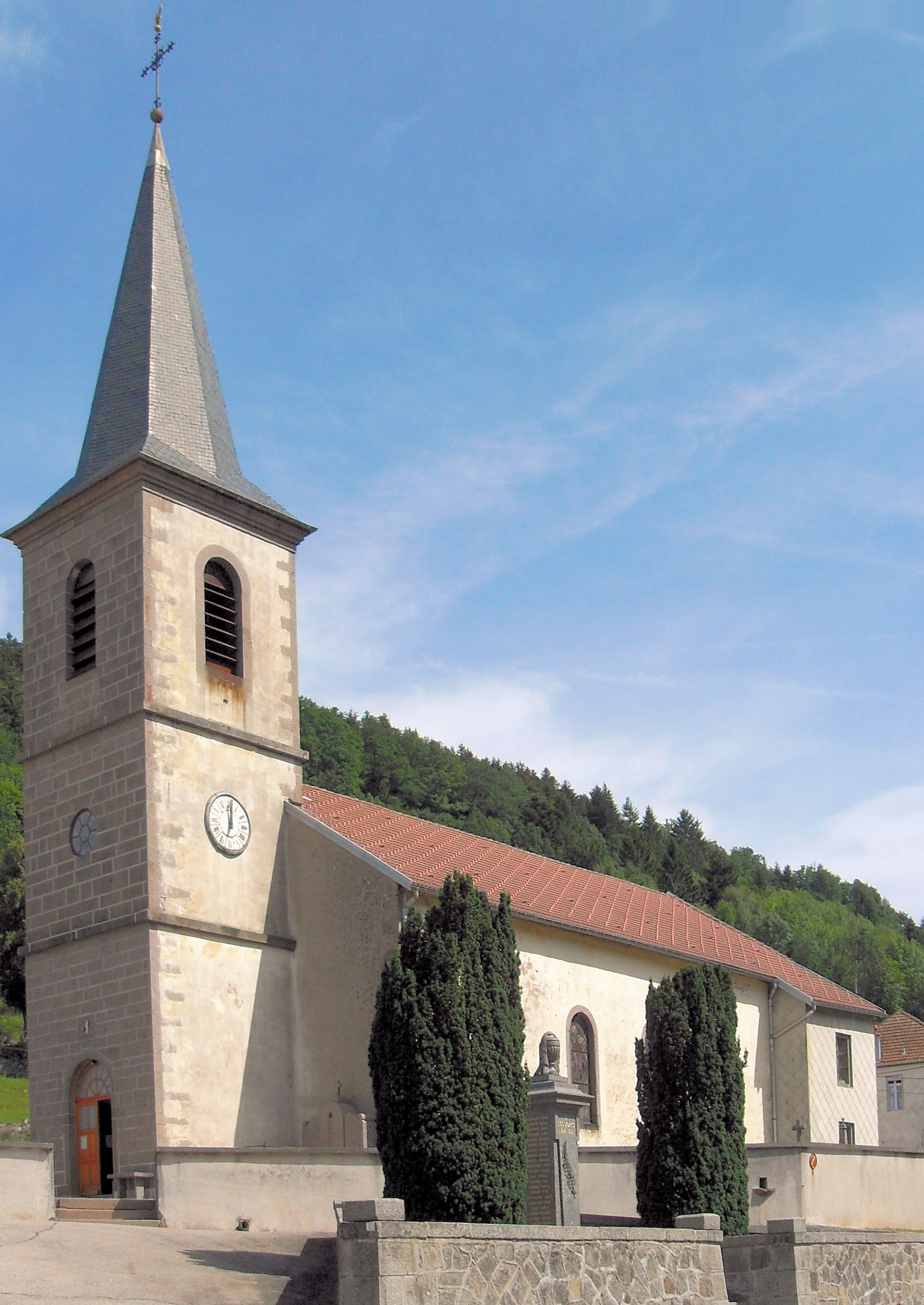

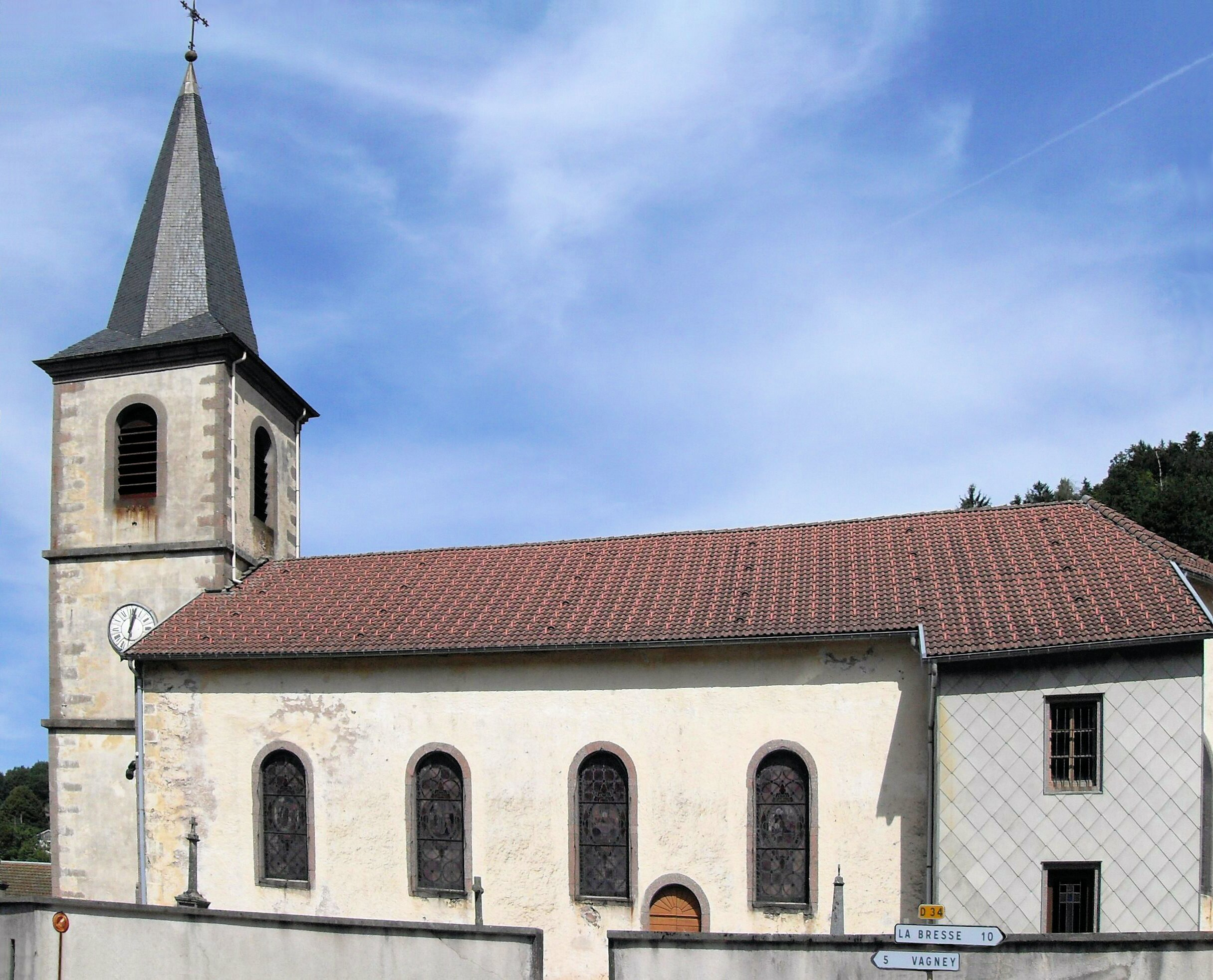

== Personalities ==
- Isidore Étienne, 4 February 1872 - 2 January 1960, a local businessman, was president of the union of French granite-workers.

== Heraldry ==
Description of the emblazon
Original French	Tranché: - au I : d'argent, aux monts de sinople mouvants de la pointe chargés d'une pierre de granit d'argent mouvant aussi de la pointe et mise en pal; - au II : d'or, à la roue à aubes de sable; - une cotice en bande d'azur brochant la partition; - au chef de gueules chargé de sept besants d'argent rangés en fasce.
English blazon	blazon needed…
Notes	The blazon is recent, designed in 1999 by a local artist, Olivier Claudon. It represents some characteristics of the commune: Its seven hamlets; The river which crosses it, the Rupt, which flows straight from the Moselotte; Its economic history, based on; the water which gave rise to its textile industry, electric turbines and sawmills; granite-working; Its professor of botanical sciences Paul Henri Lecomte.
Status	Official status to be determined…

== See also ==
- Communes of the Vosges department
