= Addi Bâ =

Addi Bâ Mamadou
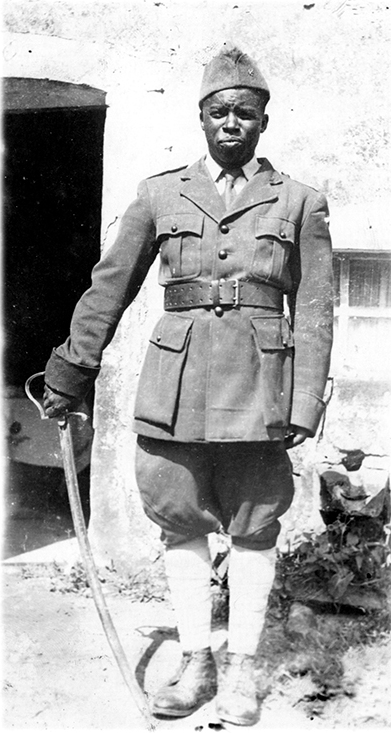
- Addi Bâ in Tollaincourt, 1943
- Born: Mamadou Hady Bah; 25 December 1916; Pelli-Foulayabé, Bomboli, French Guinea
- Died: 18 December 1943 (aged 26); Épinal, Occupied France
- Military career
- Allegiance: Free France
- Branch: Army
- Nickname: Addi Bâ
- Unit: Maquis des Vosges
- Conflicts: World War II in France (executed)

Addi Bâ Mamadou (25 December 1916 – 18 December 1943) was part of the French Resistance as a member of the first Maquis des Vosges during World War II, known to the Germans as "the Black Terrorist" (Der schwarze Terrorist).

== Biography ==
Addi Bâ arrived in France in 1938 with the family of a colonial tax collector and spent a year in Langeais in Indre-et-Loire before returning to Paris. He enlisted in the French army in 1939 as part of the 12th regiment of Senegalese Tirailleurs. Bâ was taken prisoner, but managed to escape and joined others in the maquis des Vosges. He was arrested on 18 November 1943 by Germans after the attack of the maquis of the Délivrance group. Bâ was tortured but did not speak. On 18 December 1943, Bâ was shot at Épinal along with the leader of the maquis, Marcel Arburger.

== Legacy ==
On 13 July 2003, Bâ was posthumously awarded the Resistance Medal.

In 2010, the former footballer Lilian Thuram devoted a chapter to Addi Bâ in his work Mes étoiles noires ("My Black Stars") on historically important black individuals. Some extracts of this chapter were published on 4 September 2010 in the journal L'Humanité, as part of a feature titled "Portraits de résistants."

His life was recounted in a romanticised manner by Tierno Monénembo in his novel le Terroriste noir, published by éditions du Seuil in 2012.

In September 2013, Étienne Guillermond published Addi Bâ, résistant des Vosges, with éditions Duboiris, the result of ten years of research into the young Guinean.

A street in Tollaincourt and another in Langeais are named in his honour.

== Bibliography ==
- Guillermond, Étienne (2013). Addi Bâ: résistant des Vosges. Paris: Duboiris. p. 382. ISBN 978-2-916872-24-7. OCLC 860689020.
- Hopquin, Benoît (2009). Ces noirs qui ont fait la France: du chevalier de Saint-George à Aimé Césaire. Paris: Calmann-Lévy. p. 300. ISBN 978-2-7021-3988-2. OCLC 742858310.
- Lilian Thuram, with the collaboration of Bernard Fillaire, Mes étoiles noires, Éditions Philippe Rey, 2010
- Monénembo, Tierno (2012). Le Terroriste noir. Paris: Éditions du Seuil. p. 224. ISBN 978-2-02-098669-4. OCLC 809617646.
