= Green Route (Europe) =

Trail in France and Germany

The Green Route (French: Route Verte, German: Grüne Straße) is a 205-kilometer-long trail spanning both sides of the Rhine. It was established in 1960 through the joint efforts of France and Germany, following an initiative by Joseph Rey, the mayor of Colmar. The aim for both nations was to further the cause of their reconciliation by encouraging cross-border travel that immersed visitors in the local landscape, gastronomy, and culture. It is named after the fir trees lining the road in both the Vosges and the Black Forest.

== In Germany ==
Crossing the Rhine towards Breisach and Freiburg im Breisgau, and then traversing the Black Forest in a southeasterly direction, the national road (Bundesstraße 31) passes near the towns of Kirchzarten, Hinterzarten, Titisee-Neustadt, Löffingen, and Donaueschingen.

== ّIn france ==
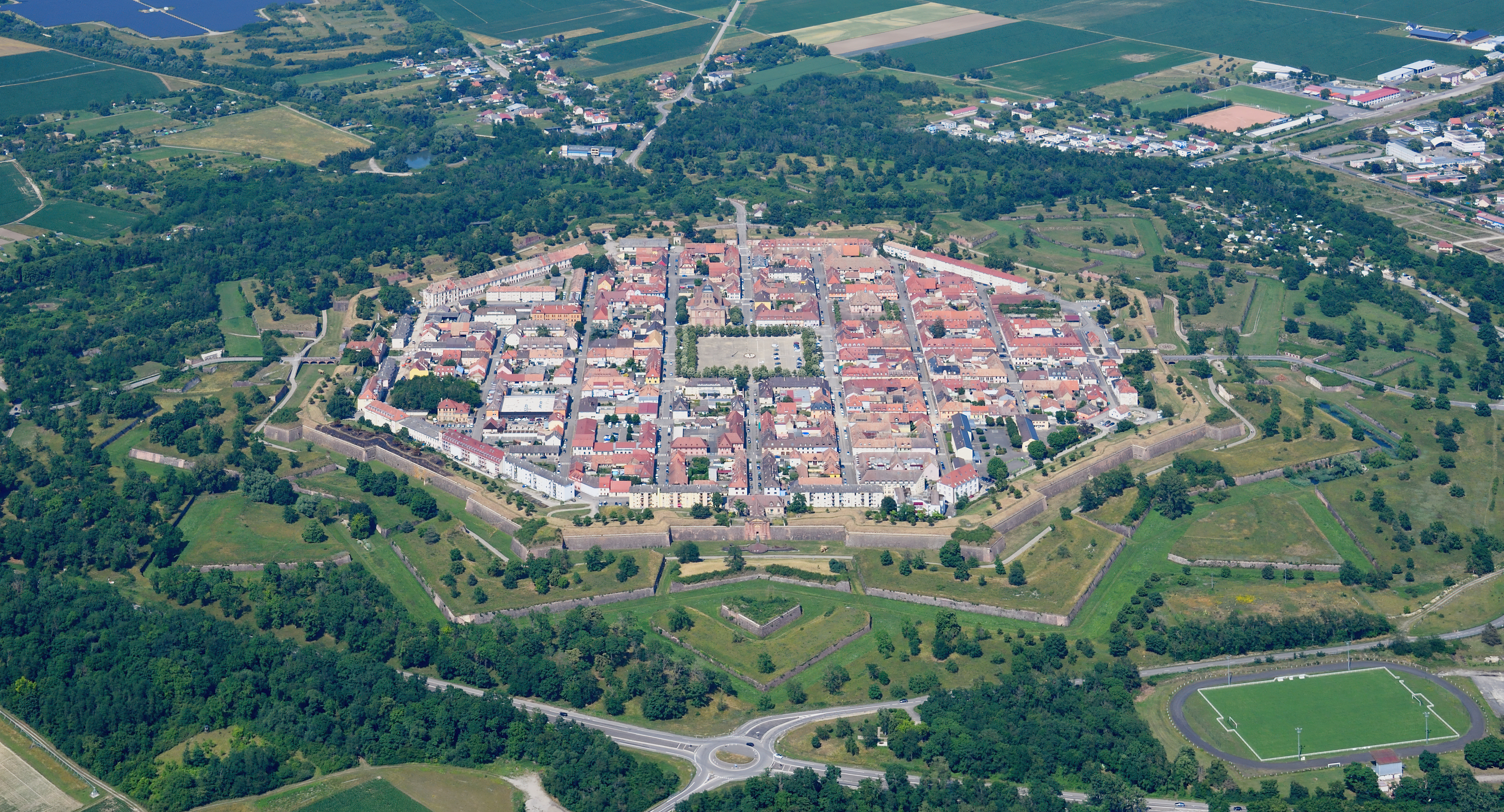
Fortification at Neuf-Brisach

Ten stages are featured on the route in France: Contrexéville, Vittel, Épinal, Le Tholy, Gérardmer, Munster, Turckheim, Colmar, Horbourg-Wihr, and Neuf-Brisach—a fortified site inscribed on the UNESCO World Heritage List since July 7, 2008. The other seven towns are participating in Germany.

== History ==
The route emerged alongside other initiatives—such as town twinning arrangements—linked to Franco-German reconciliation following the Second World War. The principal initiator of the "Green Road" (established in 1960/61) was Joseph Rey (Mayor of Colmar from 1947 to 1977); his collaborators included Willy Boss (Black Forest–Lake Constance region) and Josef Bueb (Mayor of Breisach from 1948 to 1962).

The *Grüne Straße* / *Route Verte* thus connects the French regions of Lorraine and Alsace with the German state of Baden-Württemberg. Route Verte linked to Franco-German reconciliation following the Second World War.
