= Maquis du Haut-du-Bois =

The Maquis du Haut-du-Bois, also known as the Maquis d'Éloyes, was a combat unit of the French forces of the interior within the Maquis des Vosges. The unit made a large contribution towards liberating the Éloyes region. Armed operations by the maquisards were supported by regular distributions of tracts and newspapers calling out to the resistance.

== Testimonies ==
A commemorative postcard from the banque numérique d’images de Lorraine illustrates the tragic events of 9 September 1944. The last survivors of the maquis were allowed to draw up a definitive list of the maquisards.

The testimony of Étienne Pierrat (honorary mayor), who was 19 years old at the time, was published in the La Liberté de l’Est daily on 8 September 1995, helping to understand the circumstances in which the Nazis' encirclement of the maquisards played out. That a large portion of the resistance fighters managed to barely escape the German assault was thanks to the sacrifice of several among them who stayed at their position to face the attackers and allow their comrades to disperse towards Hauts de Tendon.

== History of the maquis ==
This passage, completed by Colonel Pierre Aiguier of Éloyes, resulted in the collection of information on witnesses of that time and both published and unpublished documents.

=== First operations led at Éloyes ===
From February 1944, Hubert Hocquaux (23 years old), known as "Grizzli", organized the first meetings and formed a resistance group at Éloyes, whose were all very young. Weapons initially came from "cachettes" maintained since 1940. Some weapons recovery missions from German depots, stationary trains and from the Pouxeux barracks, or from the Kaiser (Wallach) factory allowed the equipment of part of the force.

The group met at Idoux's place (the café du Cinéma), Pierrat's place, the tinsmith's, and in other places, particularly at the initiative of Pierre Bédel, head of the boys' school. Some met at Mrs. Mougel's place, who was known as Grande Yvonne and was the tenant proprietor at a café at Arches. All answered "present" when the BBC radio from London broadcast the message "Croissez roseaux, bruissez feuillages, je porterai l'églantine" (Grow, you reeds, rustle, you leaves, I will bring the wild rose).

=== Creation of the maquis ===
On 24 July 1944, after a mission, two members of the French Forces of the Interior, Maurice Hocquaux and his aide, were arrested by French detectives. Thanks to much support, their freedom was obtained.

The group built itself up and reached about thirty men through the addition of fighters from neighbouring villages. The Maquis d'Éloyes was created in Haut-du-Bois, in the commune of Xamontarupt, as part of the 2nd Vosges formation. Its first leader was Lieutenant Romann, a former policeman. The parachute drop location of l'Aclimont, just nearby, was approved by London under the codename "Roitelet".

A tented camp with parachutes allowed men to be accommodated. Supplies were acquired from "collaborators" (or people presumed to be such). A baker in Éloyes provided bread, while the miller, Hocquaux, supplied dough. In such a time of want, this nonetheless allowed for a sufficient diet.

While guards made sure of short-range defense, long-range protection was not adequate. The constant coming and going of many people and vehicles interfered with the secrecy of the operation, and discipline in general lacked rigor.

Missions followed. An initial exchange took place at the Croix Bouquot, not far from the maquis, between an FFI patrol and a small German detachment whose members were staying in Éloyes. The leader gave the order to pull back because their weaponry was not sufficient.

The first parachute drop took place at Arches on 2 August 1944. The code was "le chêne" (oak) and the personal message was "Le coq mange des noisettes" (the rooster is eating hazelnuts). It was to arm Épinal.

On 26 August 1944, the maquis fighters of Haut du Bois received their own first parachute drop. It was containers with grenades, machine guns, machine pistols and rifles with the appropriate ammunition. The personal message was "Le soleil à rendez-vous avec la lune" (the sun has a meeting with the moon), quoting the refrain of a popular song "Le Soleil et la Lune" by the famous French vocalist Charles Trenet. Three lights in a triangle and one sudden light on the right-hand side was the signal for the release of the parachute.

On 28 August 1944, the thirty or so members of the maquis led by adjutant Munch carried out an ambush just before the Tendon falls. The aim was to rescue prisoners who were being transferred to Germany. After a few gunshots, the FFI were compelled to retreat due to the Germans' superior numbers.

The only weapons deliveries were where the "Jedburghs" were parachuted under Operation Jedburgh. These last "Jeds" were groups of three men: A British liaison officer, a French officer and an English non-commissioned officer, charged with radio links. Parachuted from mid-August 1944, their missions were to support or coordinate and encourage FFI operations. It was in this fashion that a French-British mission composed of British Major Oliver Brown, French Captain René Karrière, and English radio Sergeant Schmich was parachuted in near Rambervillers. Hubert Hocquaux went to look for them on foot and led them through the woodland before leaving them secretly in the mill of his cousine Marcel Hocquaux on the evening of 31 August 1944.

After the parachutists set up in Hocquaux' mill, Captain Karrière made immediate contact with the liberators. Thence he pursued his activities coordinating FFI operations and linking up with the Americans. Major Brown did the same from the farm where he had been hidden for several days. The third member of the team, Radio-Sergeant Schmith, was already with the Americans, at the house of Gustave Mathieu at Chaud Côté. At the time of the maquis' attack he had gone to the house to contact London by radio in a more secure environment. While he was hidden in the house's attic, Germans, not knowing he was there, entered the farm to dump their supplies. Despite the danger, the Mathieu family took charge of helping him get away to the forest, all the time continuing to provide him with food.

The resistance fighters acted from their various bases: the Hocquaux mill, Idoux's café du Cinéma, and Pierrat the tinsmith's, put themselves immediately at the disposal of the liberators to serve as guides.

During the night of 8–9 September 1944, a second parachute drop with the same code and personal message as the first, brought 150 grenades, 11 Sten automatic pistols, 9 rifles, 250 individual dressings and some clothing. This, however, was not enough to arm the whole FFI. More and more escapees from the Service du Travail Obligatoire were arriving from Éloyes and neighbouring communes; some were in fairly well-armed units such as the Golbey group and the "thirty" from the Val-d'Ajol. The operatives surpassed 300 men; the new head of the maquis, Henri Perrin d'Épinal, known as "Achille", decided to send home a certain number of them who had no weapons.

==== Attack on the maquis ====
For several days the maquis had known that an attack on the camp was imminent, through information that had come to them about German troop movements. However, on the morning of 9 September 1944, "Achille", head of the maquis, left the camp to make contact in Eloyes with Major Brown, head of the Franco-British mission. On arrival at the village, he was arrested by a German patrol, interrogated and held in the former post office building near the hospice. He was freed the same evening. Lieutenant Romann, head of the first "hundred" was likewise away from the maquis since he had left the camp beforehand with an overarmed group.

Resistance members ("about a hundred") who had just received a second package of light weapons, were present on the maquis. In their leader's absence, Lieutenant Girod had taken command. For effective defence, he had a machine-gun set towards the north of the camp, and another above the Ruxelier stream gorge, to control the routes leading towards Cheniménil et Jarménil. A third machine gun was hidden at the source of the Ruxelier.

Similar positions were taken in the direction of Eloyes by Lieutenant Scheider, and towards the east by Lieutenant Gaillot. Meanwhile, Sub-lieutenant Villemin and adjudant Pierson ensured the evacuation of the remaining unarmed maquisards toward Purifaing in good order. At about 11 o'clock, Mrs Alexandre née Hocquaux of Jarménil went to the maquis to warn the fighters that the enemy was arriving. A German battalion manned by SS troops had been deploying since dawn in Eloyes, Cheniménil et Jarménil. From these bases they were besieging the Haut-du-bois plateau with trucks and two troop transport tankettes. The attack began at midday in the Ruxelier gorge, which the Germans approached by crawling up each side. The fighting was fierce but clearly unequal, although a German tankette was destroyed. Lieutenant Girod stood in front of the defenses, and was hit by a bullet in the scapula, two in the calf, and by a grenade blast in the right thigh. His comrades evacuated, and he was later cared for at the hospital in Remiremont.

The maquisards were obliged to fall back under German pressure and having sustained losses of dead and injured, but not before destroying the ammunition dump. The order of retreat given by adjudant Munch saved the life of many FFI fighters who managed to get away, with about 20 injured, towards the Fossard massif, getting through across the German block which was set up on the road leading to the Hocuaux mill at la Bisoire.

They left behind 10 dead, namely Marcel Bolmont, Émile Deschaseaux (Val d'Ajol), Paul Dufour (Eloyes), André Lacuve, René Legrand, César Remy, Alphonse Rost, Marcel Valentin (Archettes), Christian Lhoner (Remiremont) et Jean Schneider (Arches). At the same time, Paul Dufour's father, Louis Dufour, was shot at Jarménil.

In the afternoon, allied aircraft, who had been warned by the Franco-British liaison group's English radio sergeant, arrived at base in Saint-Dizier. In two passes to flush the trees in the direction of Eloyes-Jarménil, they strafed the German troops, who sustained heavy losses, apparently over a hundred dead and two hundred wounded.

After the attack, the thirty or so maquis fighters stayed together in a dedicated unit and continued their action. Part of this group fell at Ménafaing. Other awaited the Americans on the banks of the Moselle or towards Dounoux and Xertigny. Many of the Haut-du-Bois fighters pursued the struggle in the French Army until the end of the war.

On Saturday 23 September 1944, Eloyes was liberated by the 143rd regiment of the United States infantry, commanded by Colonel Paul D. Adams.

==== The ambush at the Perrin farm ====
On 25 September 1944 at midday, the US Army 143rd Infantry Regiment, whose units were finding themselves in difficulty from the direction of Ménafaing, requested help trying to contain a German counter-attack. As a result of a misunderstanding, an officer from the 143rd who was in Éloyes asked an NCO of the maquis for FFI reinforcements. They were to plug a hole in the Fossard system with all available forces, judged to be about 20 men. A group of poorly trained and lightly armed resistance fighters was formed immediately. A GMC truck brought them towards the Fossard Massif via the Chênes et la Suche road. The men dismounted from the truck at Chaud Côté in front of the Gustave Mathieu farm, and some among them asked the son of the house, Georges (22 years), to join them. Georges Mathieu had just returned from a long mission guiding Americans towards Tendon, and hoping to eat something first, declined.
Without waiting for him, the fighters set off on the mission. Their march through the forest passed without difficulty. At a certain point, the group separated in two, with one team continuing through the forest along the brook, while the other aimed to make more rapid progress.

For this group, the path took them out of cover, into the long sloping meadow which led to the Perrin farm in Ménafaing. A German machine gun squad, which had moved in recently after the partial and temporary retreat of an American unit, had the opportunity to observe the group approach at their leisure. The Perrin family, whose cellar was being occupied, was composed of the mother, Louise, and some children including the 10-year-old Jean-Marie. A neighbour, Mrs. Ancel née Thomas was with them. Lucien Perrin was in the Mathieu farm at Chaud Côté.

Unsuspectingly, the maquis passed by the farm. At the moment when they were about to reach the edge of the wood through a hollow and re-enter cover, they were mowed down in a hail of machine gun bullets at point-blank range. Some were killed on the spot, while others who were wounded were subsequently finished off with a pistol shot to the neck. One man alone, Jules Hingray, despite being hit, managed to escape the killing by hiding behind a rock and feigning death. He stayed there for 24 hours without aid.

Learning that the patrol was in difficulty, the Americans gave a barrage of covering fire allowing them to fall back, although not to recover the dead and injured. A shell set fire to the hangar of the farm. The other team managed to shelter from enemy fire. Seven FFI were killed in all: Maurice Nurdin, Marcel Bichotte (of Arches), Raymond Varoy (of Pouxeux), André Bosselmeyer, Louis Trinquart, Robert Cipollini and Ernest Pierre (of Eloyes). One of the victims, le FFI fighter Robert Cippollini aged 34, was the uncle of Colonel Pierre Aiguier-Cipollini.

The Germans passed the night in the farm, and evacuated the following morning. By the end of the afternoon of 26 September, calm had returned, and civilians overheard the cries of Hingray, who had been hit in the legs. He was transported to the house in a wheelbarrow. Lucien Perrin, who had returned to his farm, drove Hingray in a cow truck towards Mathieu's farm at Chaud Côté, where he received care from a US Army medic before being evacuated to hospital. The FFI agents were warned and Perrain took on the task of bringing down the bloodied corpses to Eloyes through heavy rain on his plate carriage, drawn by two oxen. The municipality set up a chapelle ardente at the mairie, where the comrades of the seven dead watched over their remains. In the midst of the confusion which reigned, the dead were put in their bier along with their equipment and with ammunition in their magazines.

On Friday 28 September 1944 at 10 am, Father Gerrard, the curate of Eloyes, celebrated a funeral service in the village church, with significant attendance. It was a long and very emotional ceremony. Members of the American Staff and numerous FFI were present, with their head René Matz ("Commandant Didier"), the departmental FFI leader. Lieutenant Romann, first head of the Eloyes maquis, gave the deceased a vibrant elegy.

The next day, the 29 September, Lieutenant Romann was killed in a car incident at "Trou Vauthier" in unclear circumstances.

On Monday 2 October 1944, a ceremony took place at the church for the dead of the maquis du Haut-du-Bois and others who were shot at Jarménil. A detachment of FFI gave the honours. People present included Mr. Parisot, prefect of Vosges, the gendarmerie captain Gonsard de Remiremont, Lieutenant Fleurot, and Commandant Didier.

Regarding those shot at Jarménil, the wife of Haut-du-Bois fighter Maurice Grosdemange from Archettes indicated that four men died there the same day. Mr Grosdemange would have cleaned the faces of his comrades at the age of 20.

== Resistance operations ==
A distribution network for clandestine tracts was put in place by Miss Marie Joseph Blaise, a student at the Nancy who lived at Saint-Étienne-lès-Remiremont. Blaise had made contact with the resistance to ensure that circulation of these papers in St-Étienne-lès-Remiremont.

At a time when the Gestapo and the Vichy special brigades are tracking more and more patriots, when every day comrades are being arrested, we ask all our friends to make a considerable effort so that the resistance will be ever stronger. Distribute the secret newspapers, and particularly "Lorraine", "Résistance" and "Franc-tireur". Make sure that the people you give them to continue the chain. Make new workmen's and rural centres. But do not stop there; do not think that passing a newspaper to a friend is a big deal. It is just a beginning. Join the resistance, work actively. Do not join the resistance in your slippers behind a radio post. You can be useful; carry packets of newspapers to countryside centres, see your friends who are willing to work with you, make connections. Struggle against the deportations; help people who are hiding from them. They need false papers, work cards, food tickets and money. Organize [them into] maquis, where as a group they will become aware of their strength and form the kernels of the new army.

— Extract from the tract "Lorraine", 2nd year no. 15, 23 November 1943

The various Maquis des Vosges paid a heavy price in the fight against the Germans and their allies. The seven men of the shooting at Ménafaing on 23 September 1944 in the Éloyes, were also members of the Maquis du Haut-du-Bois. An annual commemoration is planned each year; in 2008 the event took place on Sunday September 21.

Remiremont and Épinal were liberated on 23 and 24 September 1944, followed by Saint-Étienne-lès-Remiremont on 25 September, by the United States Seventh Army.

== Bibliography ==
- Mathieu, Pierre (2002). La Seconde Guerre mondiale dans la région d'Eloyes (in French). Épinal: Association de recherches archéologiques et d'histoire d'Éloyes et dans ses environs. ISBN 2951345313. Presse clandestine
- Les cahiers de la Liberté de l’est, ed. (2004). La libération des Vosges, racontée par ceux qui l'ont vécue… Automne 44 – Hiver45. p. 24: Les derniers martyrs du Haut-du-Bois.
