= Faucompierre =

- Commune
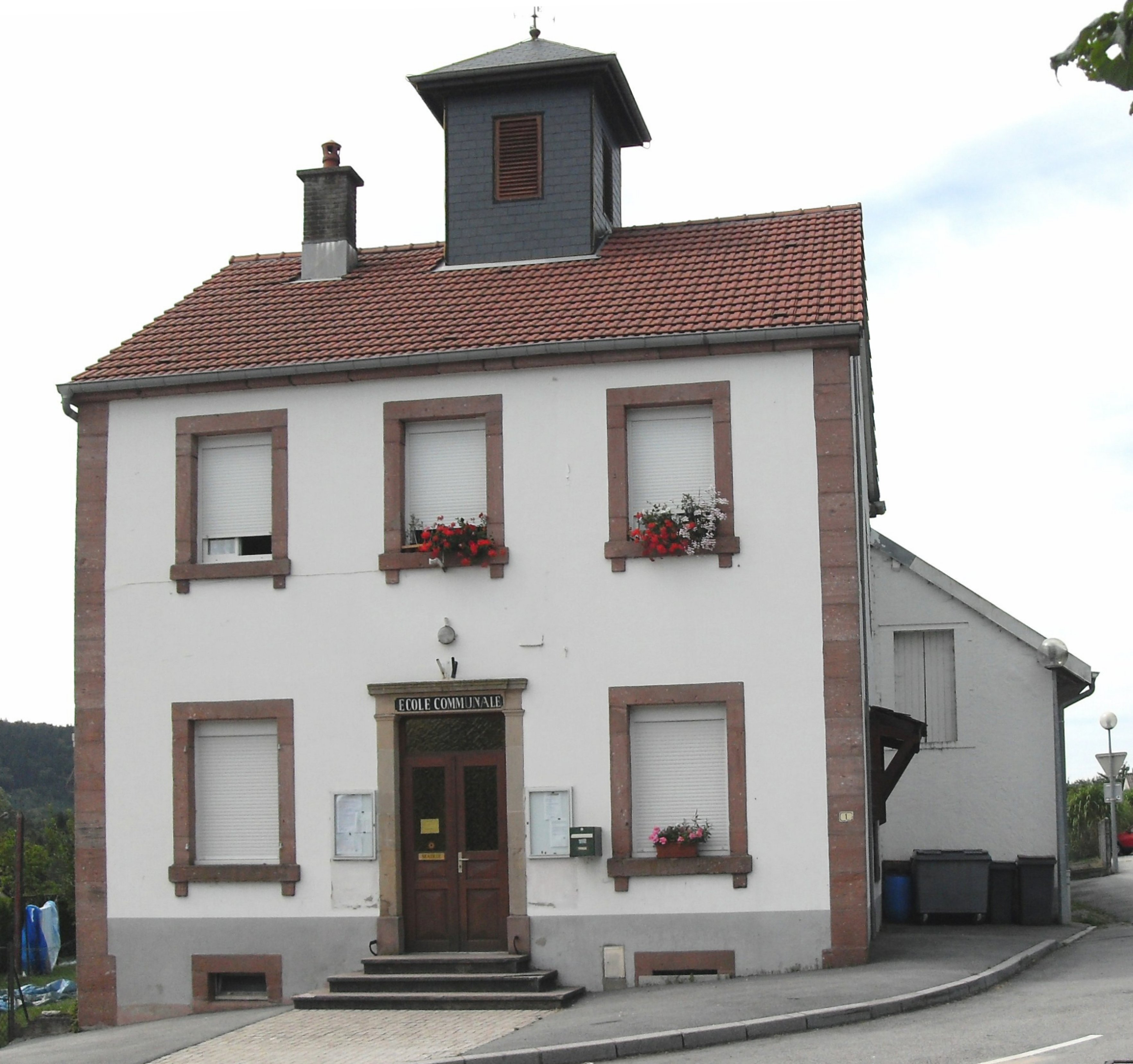
- The town hall and school in Faucompierre
- Location of Faucompierre
- Location within France Location within Grand Est
- Coordinates: 48°08′20″N 6°40′17″E
- Country: France
- Region: Grand Est
- Department: Vosges
- Arrondissement: Saint-Dié-des-Vosges
- Canton: La Bresse
- Intercommunality: CC Bruyères - Vallons des Vosges

Government
  - Mayor (2020–2026): Michel Paradis
- Area^{1}: 2.45 km^{2} (0.95 sq mi)
- Highest elevation: 649 m (2,129 ft)
- Lowest elevation: 394 m (1,293 ft)
- Population (2023): 227
  - Density: 92.7/km^{2} (240/sq mi)
- Time zone: UTC+01:00 (CET)
  - Summer (DST): UTC+02:00 (CEST)
- INSEE/Postal code: 88167 /88460
- ^{1} French Land Register data, which excludes lakes, ponds, glaciers > 1 km^{2} (0.386 sq mi or 247 acres) and river estuaries.

Faucompierre (French pronunciation: [fokɔ̃pjɛʁ]) is a commune in the Vosges department in Grand Est in northeastern France.

== See also ==
- Communes of the Vosges department
