= Tendon, Vosges =

Tendon
- Commune
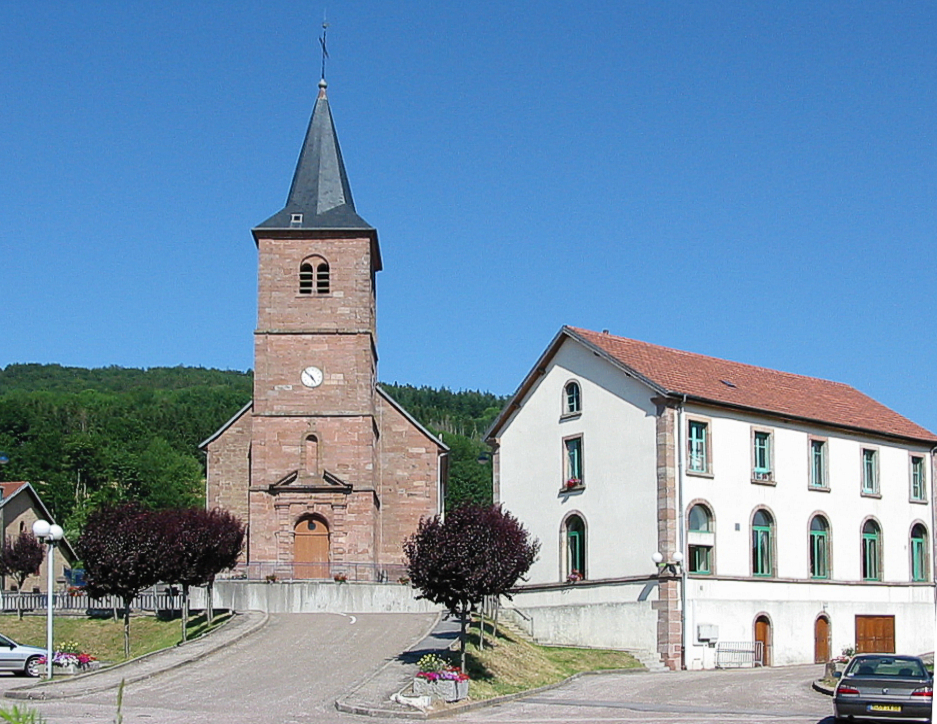
- Church and town hall

- Coat of arms
- Location of Tendon
- Location within France Location within Grand Est
- Coordinates: 48°07′21″N 6°40′47″E
- Country: France
- Region: Grand Est
- Department: Vosges
- Arrondissement: Épinal
- Canton: La Bresse
- Intercommunality: CC Hautes Vosges

Government
  - Mayor (2020–2026): Gérard Clément
- Area^{1}: 21.85 km^{2} (8.44 sq mi)
- Highest elevation: 807 m (2,648 ft)
- Lowest elevation: 409 m (1,342 ft)
- Population (2023): 499
  - Density: 22.8/km^{2} (59.1/sq mi)
- Time zone: UTC+01:00 (CET)
  - Summer (DST): UTC+02:00 (CEST)
- INSEE/Postal code: 88464 /88460
- ^{1} French Land Register data, which excludes lakes, ponds, glaciers > 1 km^{2} (0.386 sq mi or 247 acres) and river estuaries.

Tendon (French pronunciation: [tɑ̃dɔ̃]) is a commune in the Vosges area of Grand Est in northeastern France. Its inhabitants are known as Todas. The commune comprises a village and around 60 settlements. The history of the area dates to the Middle Ages.

== Geography ==
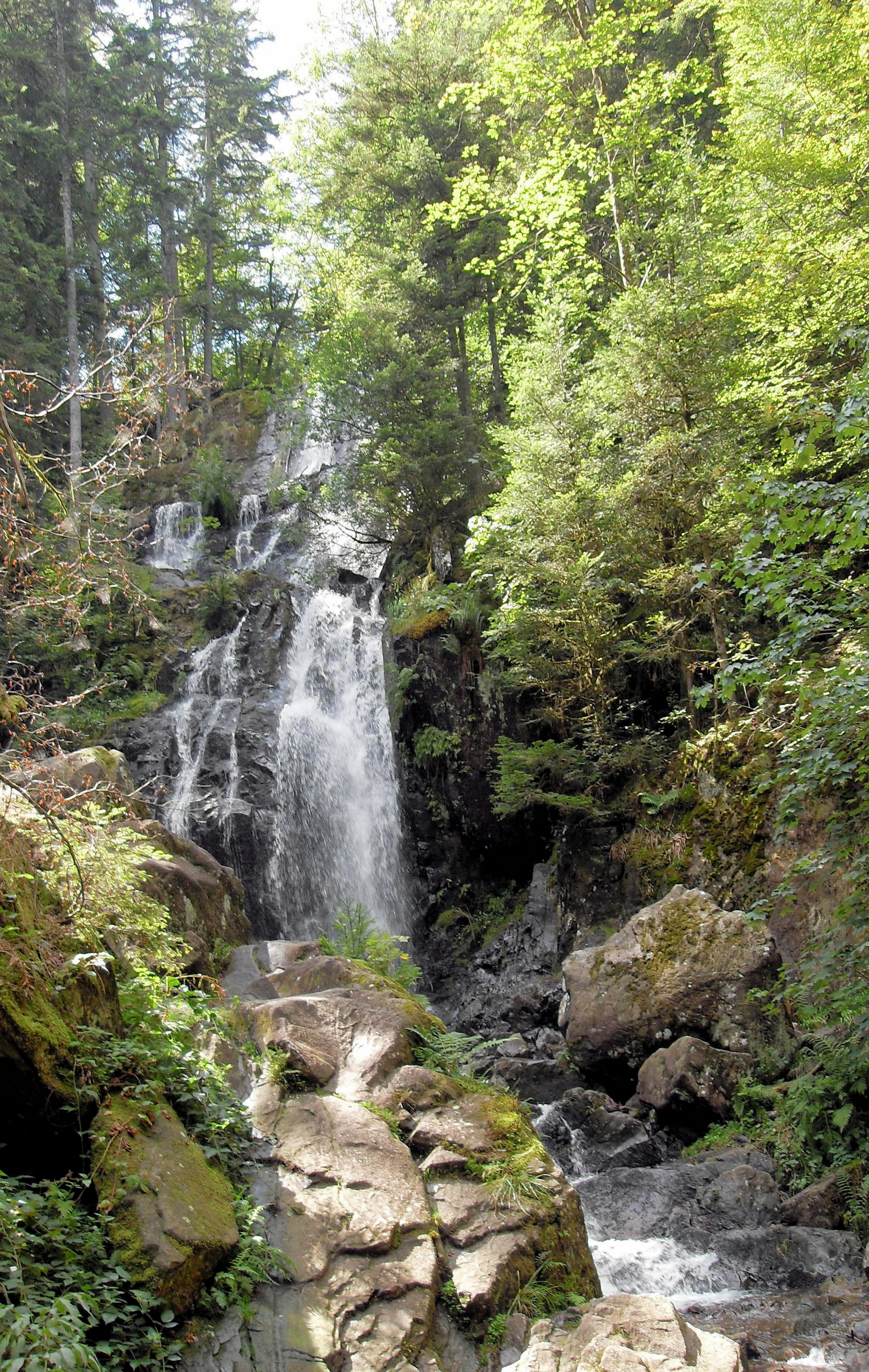
Grande Cascade de Tendon

Tendon is a commune in the heart of a long valley, composed of a village and about 60 settlements. Situated 19 kilometres east of Épinal, Tendon lies in the valley of the Scouet, a tributary of the Vologne via the Barba. 492 hectares are occupied by forest. Le Tholy is 8 km away via the Bonne Fontaine col at an elevation of 677 m.

== History ==
The ban of Tendon (Tandon), comprising the villages of Tendon, Houx, Laveline, Dehiex, Chamontaruz and La Poirie, belonged to the bailiwick of Remiremont under the Ancien Régime and depended on the mastery of the waters and forests of Épinal. It followed the custom of Lorraine.

In ecclesiastical matters, the inhabitants of the current parish of Tendon were part of that of Docelles. This ended on 3 September 1707 when the bishop of Toul elevated the small Tendon chapel, which had been built 25 years earlier, into a parish. The bishop's decision was confirmed by the Pope in 1715, against opposition from the bishop of Metz, who claimed jurisdiction over the region. Tendon was part of the prévôté of Arches.

Established as a commune in 1790, Tendon was part of the canton of Éloyes in the district, then arrondissement, of Remiremont. After the an IX, the commune was reattached to the Remiremont canton in the arrondissement of Remiremont.

== Personalities ==
Father Voyaux de Franoux, born in 1760, was the founder of a girls' school in 1825 and a hospital in 1834 in his native village. Educated at the collège de Saint-Claude, in Toul, he studied philosophy and theology in the Saint-Dié-des-Vosges Catholic seminary, then was sent to the Sorbonne by his bishop, where he received a doctorate. He was ordained as a priest and became head of the Trente-trois seminary in Paris. During the French Revolution, he emigrated to England where he was appointed apostolic vicar. After the restoration of the French monarchy, Louis XVIII made him almoner of the French embassy in London and canon of the Chapter of Saint-Denis.

== Features ==
- The waterfalls Grande Cascade de Tendon and Petite Cascade de Tendon, the first upstream, at an elevation of 32 metres in the heart of the forest of firs.
- The rocks of la Moulure.

== Demography ==
Historical population of Tendon
| Year | Pop. | ±% p.a. |
|---|---|---|
| 1968 | 423 | — |
| 1975 | 380 | −1.52% |
| 1982 | 386 | +0.22% |
| 1990 | 434 | +1.48% |
| 1999 | 448 | +0.35% |
| 2007 | 477 | +0.79% |
| 2012 | 508 | +1.27% |
| 2017 | 516 | +0.31% |
| 2023 | 499 | −0.56% |
Source: INSEE

== Heraldry ==
Description of the emblazon
| Original French | De sinople aux deux pals ondés d’argent, au franc-canton d’or chargé d’un tau de gueules. |
| English blazon | blazon needed… |
| Notes | The two silver stripes symbolise the Petite Cascade and the Grande Cascade, natural features of the region. The tau is the initial letter of the commune, in the colors of Lorraine. |
| Status | Official status to be determined… |

== See also ==
- Communes of the Vosges department
