= Le Syndicat =

- Commune
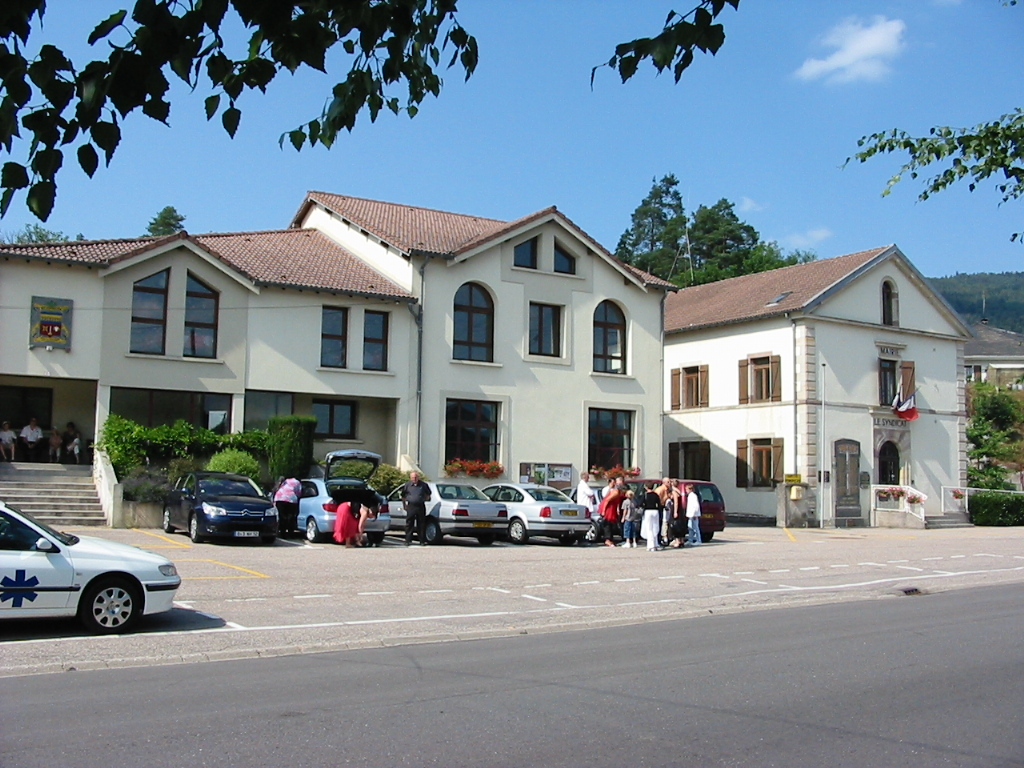
- Town hall and assembly hall

- Coat of arms
- Location of Le Syndicat
- Location within France Location within Grand Est
- Coordinates: 48°01′28″N 6°41′07″E
- Country: France
- Region: Grand Est
- Department: Vosges
- Arrondissement: Épinal
- Canton: La Bresse
- Intercommunality: CC Hautes Vosges

Government
  - Mayor (2020–2026): Pascal Claude
- Area^{1}: 18.29 km^{2} (7.06 sq mi)
- Highest elevation: 822 m (2,697 ft)
- Lowest elevation: 392 m (1,286 ft)
- Population (2023): 1,842
  - Density: 100.7/km^{2} (260.8/sq mi)
- Time zone: UTC+01:00 (CET)
  - Summer (DST): UTC+02:00 (CEST)
- INSEE/Postal code: 88462 /88120
- ^{1} French Land Register data, which excludes lakes, ponds, glaciers > 1 km^{2} (0.386 sq mi or 247 acres) and river estuaries.

Le Syndicat (French pronunciation: [lə sɛ̃dika]) is a commune in the Vosges department in Grand Est in northeastern France.

== See also ==
- Communes of the Vosges department
