= Liézey =

- Commune
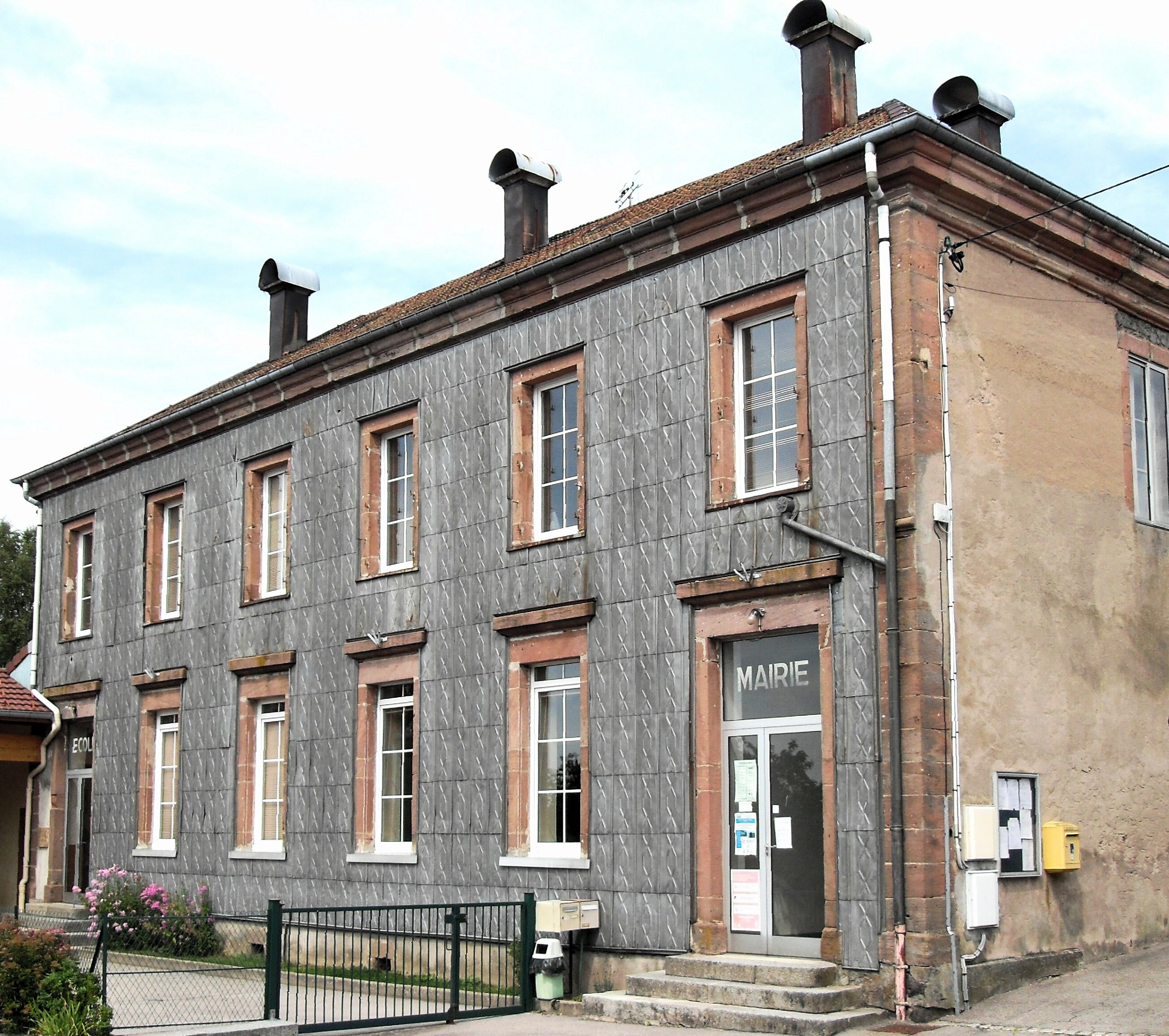
- The town hall in Liézey

- Coat of arms
- Location of Liézey
- Location within France Location within Grand Est
- Coordinates: 48°05′40″N 6°48′22″E
- Country: France
- Region: Grand Est
- Department: Vosges
- Arrondissement: Saint-Dié-des-Vosges
- Canton: Gérardmer
- Intercommunality: CC Gérardmer Hautes Vosges

Government
  - Mayor (2020–2026): Damien Descoups
- Area^{1}: 13.27 km^{2} (5.12 sq mi)
- Highest elevation: 923 m (3,028 ft)
- Lowest elevation: 584 m (1,916 ft)
- Population (2023): 304
  - Density: 22.9/km^{2} (59.3/sq mi)
- Demonym: Pouhas
- Time zone: UTC+01:00 (CET)
  - Summer (DST): UTC+02:00 (CEST)
- INSEE/Postal code: 88269 /88400
- ^{1} French Land Register data, which excludes lakes, ponds, glaciers > 1 km^{2} (0.386 sq mi or 247 acres) and river estuaries.

Liézey (French pronunciation: [ljezɛ]) is a commune in the Vosges department in Grand Est in northeastern France.

== Population ==
Historical population
Year	Pop.	±% p.a.
1968	217	—
1975	169	−3.51%
1982	245	+5.45%
1990	298	+2.48%
1999	320	+0.79%
2007	288	−1.31%
2012	279	−0.63%
2017	286	+0.50%
2023	304	+1.02%
Source: INSEE

== See also ==
- Communes of the Vosges department
