= Communauté de communes des Hautes Vosges =

Federation of municipalities in France

Hautes Vosges
- Communauté de communes
- Interactive map of Hautes Vosges
- Coordinates: 47°58′N 06°50′E
- Country: France
- Region: Grand Est
- Department: Vosges
- No. of communes: {{{nbcomm}}}
- Established: 2017
- Area: 305.2 km^{2} (117.8 sq mi)
- Population (2019): 21,195
  - Density: 69.45/km^{2} (179.9/sq mi)

The Communauté de communes des Hautes Vosges is an administrative association of rural communes in the Vosges department of eastern France. It was created on 1 January 2017 by the merger of the former Communauté de communes de Gérardmer-Monts et Vallées, Communauté de communes de la Haute Moselotte and Communauté de communes Terre de Granite. On 1 January, 2022, 8 communes separated from the Communauté de communes des Hautes Vosges to form the new Communauté de communes Gérardmer Hautes Vosges. It consists of 14 communes, and has its administrative offices at Cornimont. Its area is 305.2 km^{2}, and its population was 21,195 in 2019 (geography as of January 2022).

== Composition ==
The association comprises 14 communes:

1. Basse-sur-le-Rupt
2. La Bresse
3. Cleurie
4. Cornimont
5. La Forge
6. Gerbamont
7. Rochesson
8. Sapois
9. Saulxures-sur-Moselotte
10. Le Syndicat
11. Tendon
12. Thiéfosse
13. Vagney
14. Ventron
