= Grande Cascade de Tendon =

Waterfall in France

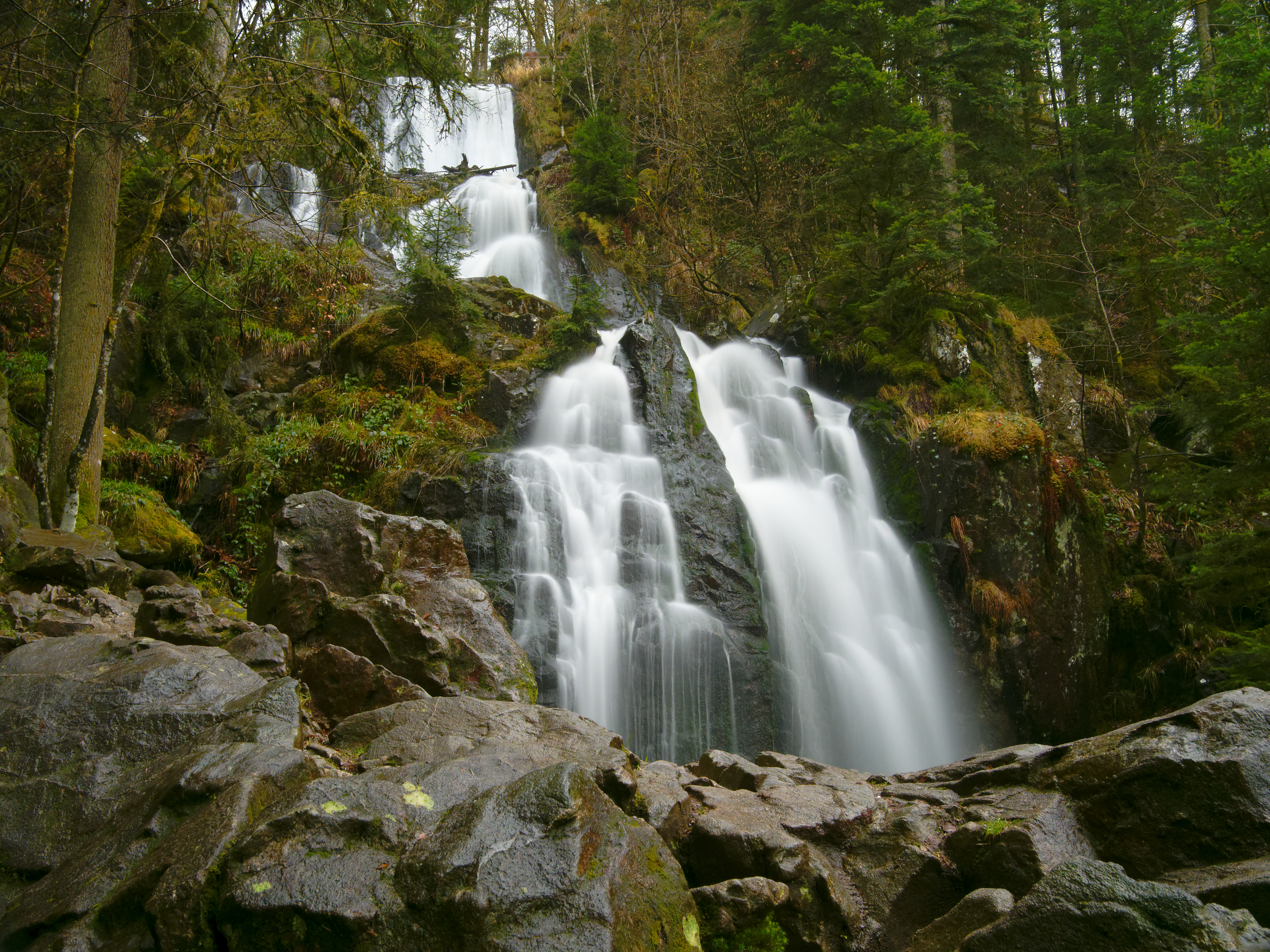
- Grande Cascade de Tendon in 2014
- Interactive map of Grande Cascade de Tendon
- Location: Tendon, Vosges, France
- Coordinates: 48.0914°N 6.6794°E
- Type: Plunge
- Total height: 32 m (105 ft)
- Watercourse: Scouet

Grande Cascade de Tendon (English: Great Waterfall of Tendon) is the highest waterfall in the Vosges department in northeastern France. Located near the village of Tendon, between the towns of Épinal and Gérardmer, the waterfall is a popular destination for tourists and nature lovers.

== Description ==
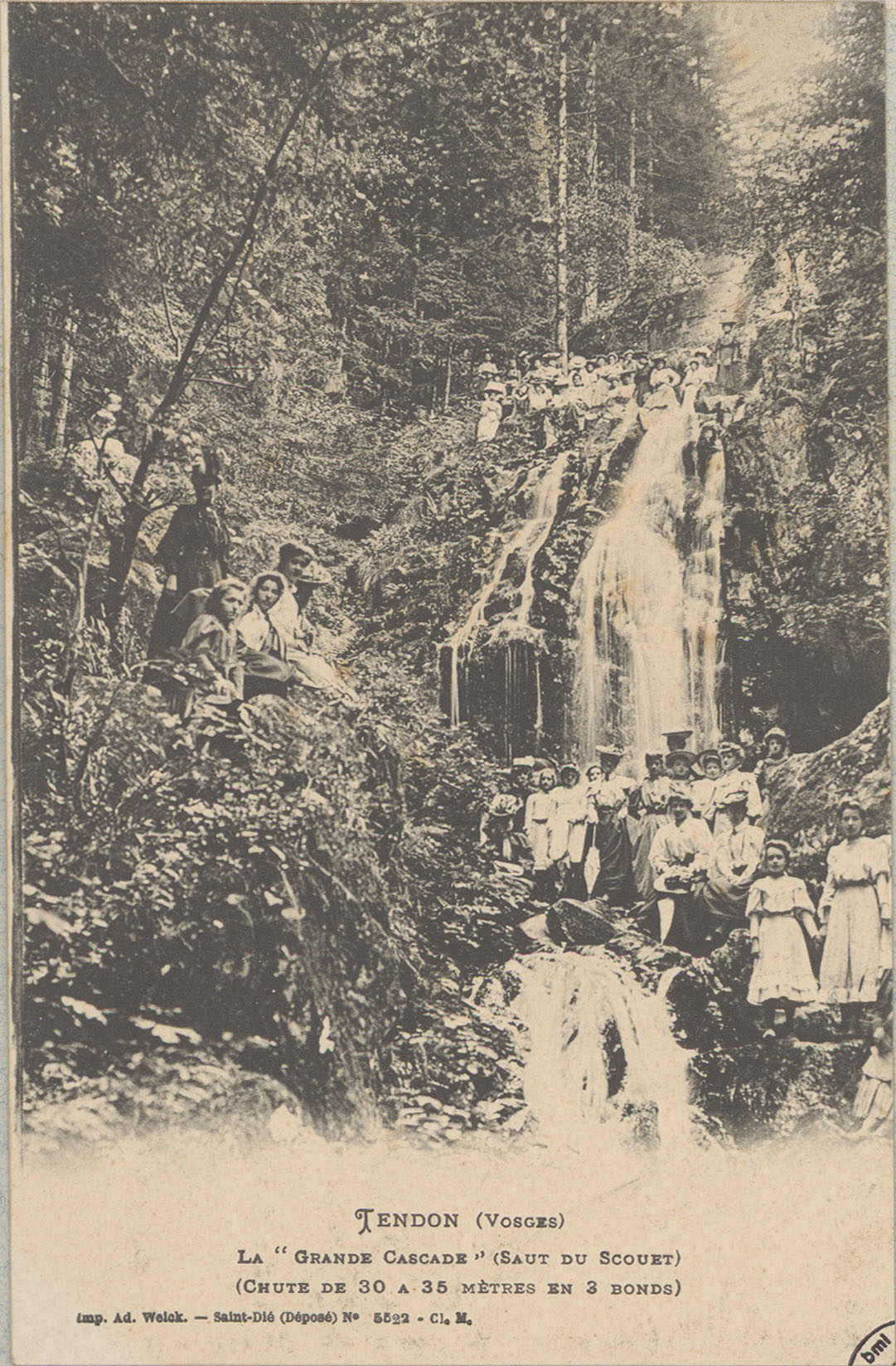
Historic view of the waterfall (postcard by Adolphe Weick)

Grande Cascade de Tendon is a single-drop plunge waterfall, with a height of approximately 32 meters (105 feet). The waterfall is located on the Scouet stream, a tributary of the Moselle via the Barba and the Vologne, which flows through a steep and rocky forested gorge before plunging down the falls. The flow of the waterfall varies with the seasons. Spring and early summer shows snowmelt and rainfall. In winter, the waterfall may partially freeze. The site is accessible year-round with a footpath to the falls from a parking area.

On the plateau, at the bottom of the hollows, there are peat bogs. In this environment, the water is acidic and has very little oxygen. When plants die, they decompose poorly. As a result, they accumulate and form a layer of peat. The peat bog acts like a water-soaked sponge. By slowly releasing its water, it helps the waterfall flow steadily.

The surrounding area is part of the Vosges Mountains, with dense forests and hiking trails.
