= La Forge, Vosges =

La Forge
- Commune
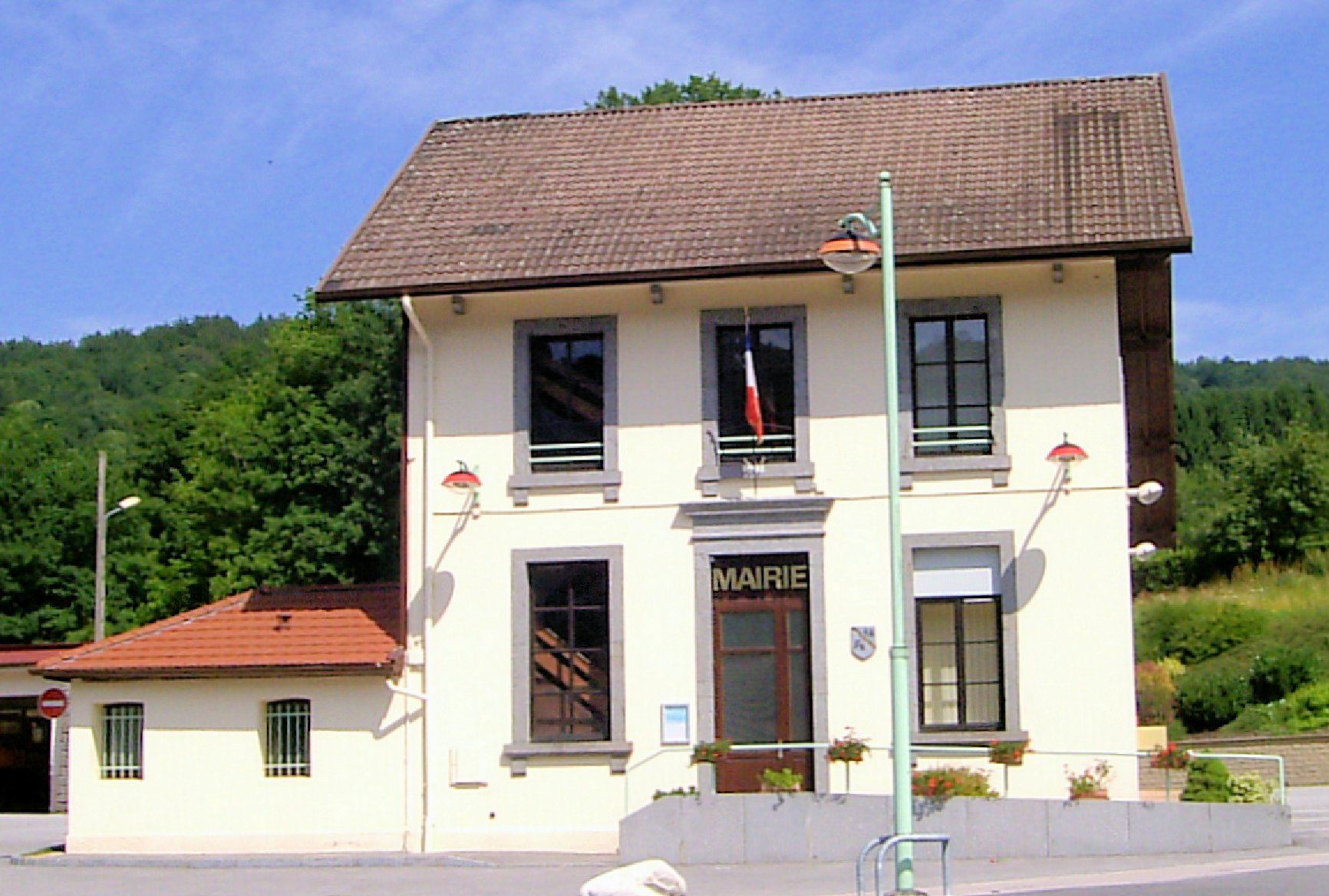
- Town hall

- Coat of arms
- Location of La Forge
- Location within France Location within Grand Est
- Coordinates: 48°03′58″N 6°43′30″E
- Country: France
- Region: Grand Est
- Department: Vosges
- Arrondissement: Épinal
- Canton: La Bresse
- Intercommunality: CC Hautes Vosges

Government
  - Mayor (2020–2026): Bernard Toussaint
- Area^{1}: 4.72 km^{2} (1.82 sq mi)
- Highest elevation: 813 m (2,667 ft)
- Lowest elevation: 469 m (1,539 ft)
- Population (2023): 517
  - Density: 110/km^{2} (284/sq mi)
- Time zone: UTC+01:00 (CET)
  - Summer (DST): UTC+02:00 (CEST)
- INSEE/Postal code: 88177 /88530
- ^{1} French Land Register data, which excludes lakes, ponds, glaciers > 1 km^{2} (0.386 sq mi or 247 acres) and river estuaries.

La Forge (French pronunciation: [la fɔʁʒ]) is a commune in the Vosges department in Grand Est in northeastern France.

== See also ==
- Communes of the Vosges department
