= Communauté de communes Gérardmer Hautes Vosges =

Federation of municipalities in France

Gérardmer Hautes Vosges
- Communauté de communes
- Interactive map of Gérardmer Hautes Vosges
- Coordinates: 48°04′N 06°53′E
- Country: France
- Region: Grand Est
- Department: Vosges
- No. of communes: {{{nbcomm}}}
- Established: 2022
- Area: 196.4 km^{2} (75.8 sq mi)
- Population (2019): 14,256
  - Density: 72.59/km^{2} (188.0/sq mi)

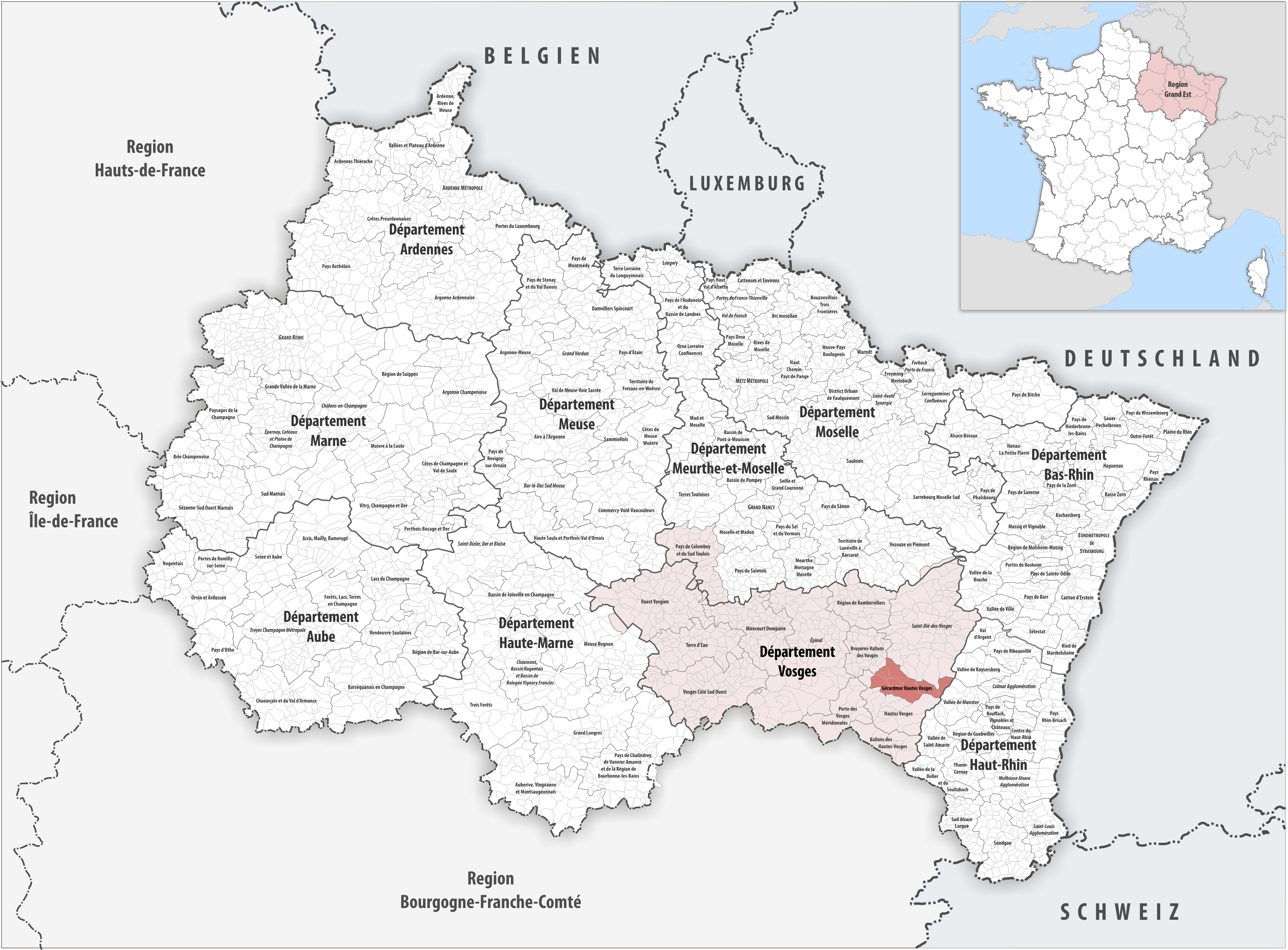
Lage des Gemeindeverbandes Gérardmer Hautes Vosges

The Communauté de communes Gérardmer Hautes Vosges is an administrative association of rural communes in the Vosges department of eastern France. It was created on 1 January 2022 from part of the Communauté de communes des Hautes Vosges. It consists of 8 communes, and has its administrative offices at Gérardmer. Its area is 196.4 km^{2}, and its population was 14,256 in 2019 (geography as of January 2022).

== Composition ==
The association comprises 8 communes:

1. Champdray
2. Gérardmer
3. Granges-Aumontzey
4. Liézey
5. Rehaupal
6. Le Tholy
7. Le Valtin
8. Xonrupt-Longemer
