= Maquis des Vosges =

The Maquis des Vosges were groups of French resistance fighters in the Department of the Vosges during the Second World War. They were associated through an amalgamation of different resistance groups roughly when the Conseil national de la Résistance was created on 27 May 1943. Maquis shrubland is a Mediterranean biome of dense shrub, which provided the guerrillas with cover.

== Organisation of the resistance in the Vosges ==
At the beginning of 1943 the principal resistance movements operating in the Vosges were:

- Ceux de la Résistance, of the Neufchâteau – Mirecourt region. This movement took charge of the Noyautage des administrations publiques.
- Those in touch which the special services of the armistice army in the Saint-Dié region. This movement would later rally to the Organisation de résistance de l'armée.
- The Organisation civile et militaire, which was essentially an organisation of officers covering the Remiremont, Plombières, Bains-les-Bains and Saint-Dié regions.
- The Lorraine movement, which originated in Nancy, but had put out feelers in the Vosges. This movement would make a secondary military agreement with the CLDR.
- Libération-Nord, which had charged itself with helping prisoners to escape.
- The Front national which was gradually swallowed up by the Francs-tireurs et partisans français.

The resistance reorganised at this time into four groupings:

- The first, including the Neufchâteau, Chatenois, Mirecourt and Vittel, was commanded by Grandjean, alias René. This grouping was the source of the first Maquis des Vosges, in the Lamarche forest between Martigny and Robécourt, at the place called the Camp de la Délivrance where the francs-tireurs had fought in 1870. Arbuger was the local organizer, assisted by the Guinean Adi Ba, the Sudanese Adama and the committed cheesemaker Picard.
- The second grouping was directed by Lucien Méline, then by Delafenêtre after Méline's arrest. It oversaw the sectors of Épinal, Dompaire, Charmes, Rambervillers and Bains.
- The third grouping was to the north-east of the department, and covered the region of Saint-Dié, led by the pastor Valet alias "capitaine Jouvet".
- The fourth grouping extended from Corcieux to Thillot and from Docelles to Gérardmer, also including the Faucogney zone in Haute-Saône and the Thann zone in Alsace. It was led by Commandant Gonand, alias Lucien.

== List of maquis in the Vosges department ==
- First grouping:

– Maquis de Bulgnéville: La Vacheresse, Urville, St-Ouen, Robécourt, Contrexéville.
– Maquis de Liffol: Bois de la Vendue, Bazoilles.
– Maquis de Vaudeville: Coussey.
– Maquis de la forêt de Neufeys: Neufchâteau, Bourlémont.
– Maquis de Châtenois.
– Maquis du Mont St-Jean: Vittel.
– Maquis de Mirecourt: « La Chouette », de la ferme de la Malhaye, du Haut de Recon, du Haut du Chia.
– Maquis du Camp de la Délivrance: Lamarche ( 1er maquis vosgien ).

- Second grouping:

– Maquis de la Cense ( Rambervillers ).
– Maquis de Charmes ( en liaison avec le 1er groupe Lorraine ).
– Maquis de Châtel.
– Maquis de la Forêt du Terne.
– Maquis du Morillon.
– Maquis de Grandrupt.
– Maquis de Xertigny.
– Maquis de St-Nabord.
– Maquis du Haut-du-Bois.

- Third grouping:

– Maquis de la Charme de l'Ormont ( Tendon ) devenu le maquis de la Chapelotte, en limite du IVème groupement.
– Maquis de la Chapelotte ( la Tête des Hérins et le Jardin David puis replié à Viombois en Meurthe-et-Moselle ).
– Maquis de Chatas qui prendra différents noms: de la Grande Fosse, de Grimaubois, du Col du Las, de Grandrupt, de la Petite Raon, de la Roche Mère Henry.
– Maquis de Lordon ( Lusse ).
– Maquis de Fouchifol ( Coinches) qui se repliera sur le Haut de Steige.

- Fourth grouping:

– Maquis de la Charme de l'Ormont ( Tendon).
– Maquis de Corcieux, secondairement sur la commune de La Chapelle.
– Maquis de Malanrupt ( Beauménil ).
– Maquis de Noiregoutte ( Rochesson ).
– Maquis de la Piquante Pierre ( Basse-sur-le-Rupt ).
– Maquis du Peut Haut ( Camp Kœnig ).
– Maquis des Roches de Morteville ( Saint-Maurice ).
– Maquis St-Jacques de Gérardmer.
– Maquis du Séchenat ( Camp Louis ).
– Maquis du Haut du Tem ( hors du département, en Haute-Saône ).
– Maquis des Beuchots à Ternuay ( hors du département, en Haute-Saône ).
– Maquis du Pleinet à Ronchamp ( hors du département, en Haute-Saône ).
– Maquis de Beulotte-St-Laurent ( hors du département, en Haute-Saône ).

Each maquis used one or several areas allocated for receiving parachute drops, some by day and others by night. These areas were endowed with a codename and a key which was either a phrase or a single letter, so that the maquis could be forewarned of an imminent parachute drop of supplies or men. For example, the maquis de la Piquante Pierre used an area in Basse-sur-le-Rupt with codename Coupole allocated for nighttime drops. Its radio codes were the phrase J'espère vous revoir chérie (I hope to see you again, darling) and the letter U.

The various maquis awaited the order from the allied forces to enter action. The maquis main strategic role was to prepare the arrival of the allied forces by occupying key positions, particularly bridges, and preventing the Germans from regrouping by undertaking widespread operations throughout the Vosges region. When the American 3rd army began its offensive towards the Vosges, most of the Reich's security forces were gathered in the Vosges, principally at Bruyères; on 5 September Heinrich Himmler made a short visit to Gerardmer to give orders to the officials of the Wehrmacht and the SS and especially to intensify the campaign against the Maquis. This most probably explains the targeted operations against the Maquis thereafter.

The Vosges Maquis whose histories have been particularly well documented were the Maquis de Charmes, the Maquis Viombois, the Maquis Noiregotte, and the Maquis de la Piquante Pierre.

== See also ==
- Operation Loyton
