= Gerbamont =

- Commune
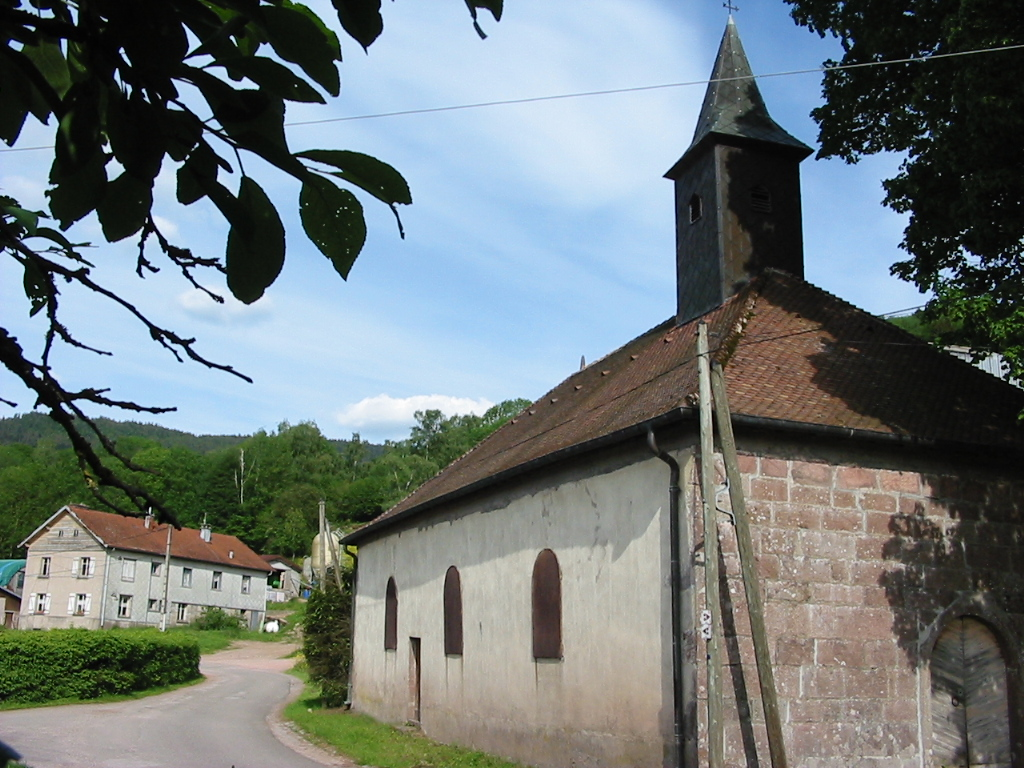
- Chapel of Saint-Del

- Coat of arms
- Location of Gerbamont
- Location within France Location within Grand Est
- Coordinates: 48°00′20″N 6°45′19″E
- Country: France
- Region: Grand Est
- Department: Vosges
- Arrondissement: Épinal
- Canton: La Bresse
- Intercommunality: CC Hautes Vosges

Government
  - Mayor (2020–2026): Régis Vaxelaire
- Area^{1}: 9.69 km^{2} (3.74 sq mi)
- Highest elevation: 1,023 m (3,356 ft)
- Lowest elevation: 409 m (1,342 ft)
- Population (2023): 354
  - Density: 36.5/km^{2} (94.6/sq mi)
- Time zone: UTC+01:00 (CET)
  - Summer (DST): UTC+02:00 (CEST)
- INSEE/Postal code: 88197 /88120
- ^{1} French Land Register data, which excludes lakes, ponds, glaciers > 1 km^{2} (0.386 sq mi or 247 acres) and river estuaries.

Gerbamont (French pronunciation: [ʒɛʁbamɔ̃]) is a commune in the Vosges department in Grand Est in northeastern France.

== See also ==
- Communes of the Vosges department
