= Sapois, Vosges =

Sapois
- Commune
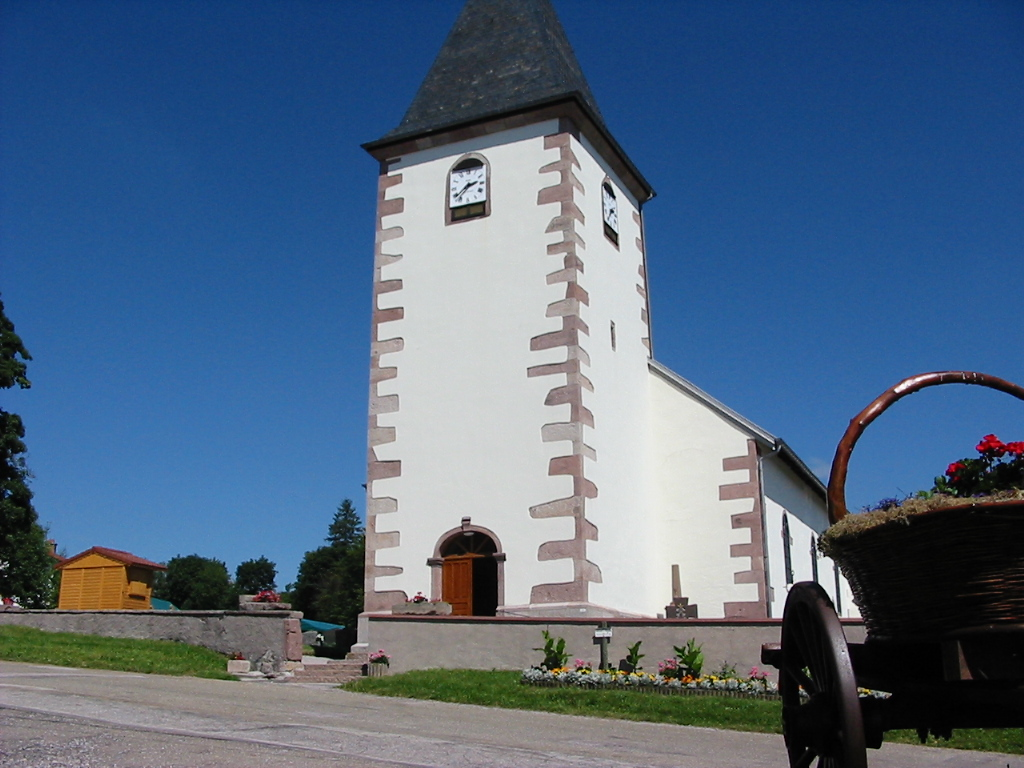
- Church of Haut du Tôt
- Location of Sapois
- Location within France Location within Grand Est
- Coordinates: 48°01′03″N 6°44′50″E
- Country: France
- Region: Grand Est
- Department: Vosges
- Arrondissement: Épinal
- Canton: La Bresse
- Intercommunality: CC Hautes Vosges

Government
  - Mayor (2020–2026): Gérard Meyer
- Area^{1}: 16.89 km^{2} (6.52 sq mi)
- Highest elevation: 1,005 m (3,297 ft)
- Lowest elevation: 423 m (1,388 ft)
- Population (2023): 625
  - Density: 37.0/km^{2} (95.8/sq mi)
- Time zone: UTC+01:00 (CET)
  - Summer (DST): UTC+02:00 (CEST)
- INSEE/Postal code: 88442 /88120
- ^{1} French Land Register data, which excludes lakes, ponds, glaciers > 1 km^{2} (0.386 sq mi or 247 acres) and river estuaries.

Sapois (French pronunciation: [sapwa]) is a commune in the Vosges department in Grand Est in northeastern France.

== See also ==
- Communes of the Vosges department
