= Thiéfosse =

- Commune
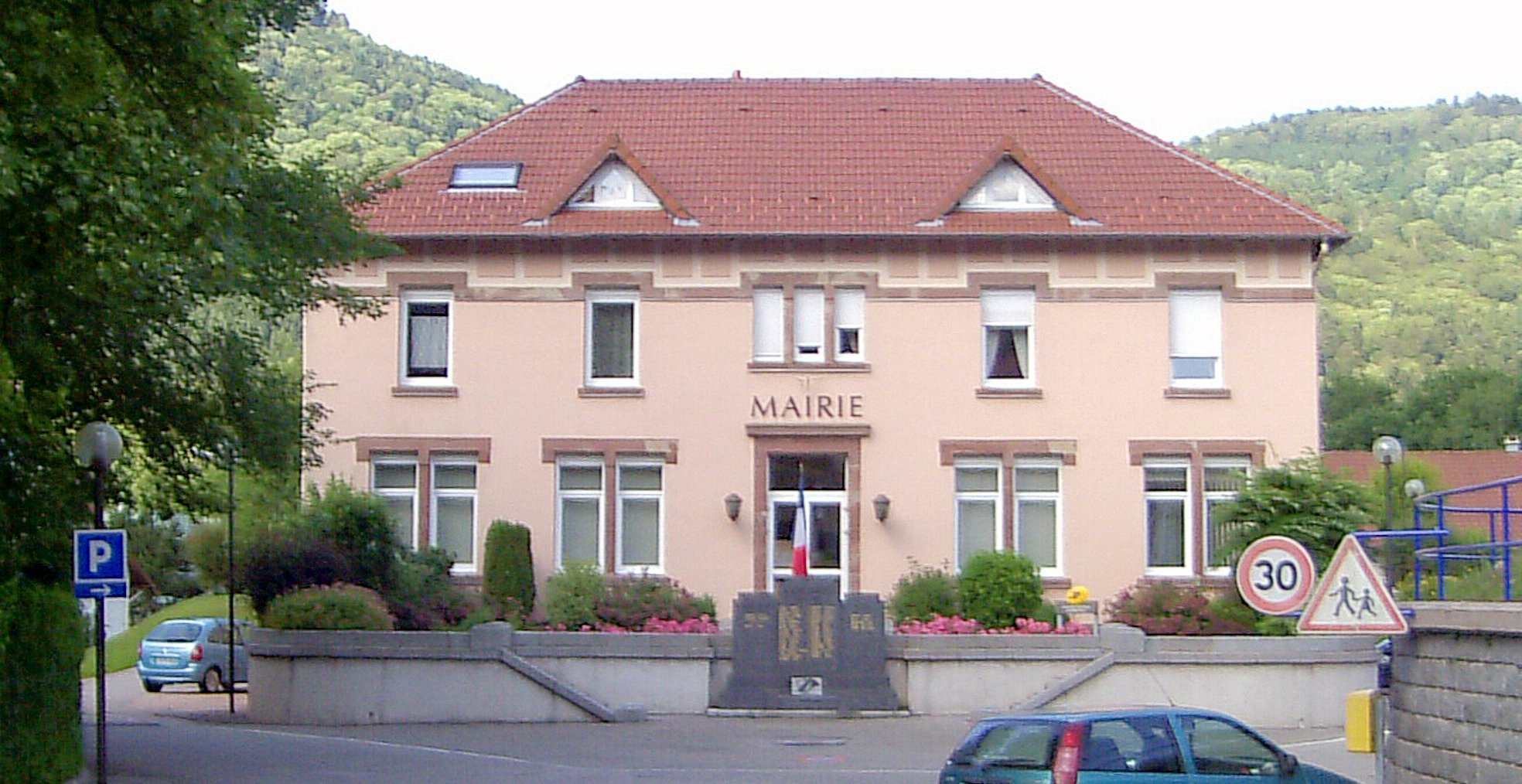
- Town hall and monument

- Coat of arms
- Location of Thiéfosse
- Location within France Location within Grand Est
- Coordinates: 47°58′20″N 6°43′51″E
- Country: France
- Region: Grand Est
- Department: Vosges
- Arrondissement: Épinal
- Canton: La Bresse
- Intercommunality: CC Hautes Vosges

Government
  - Mayor (2020–2026): Stanislas Humbert
- Area^{1}: 7.62 km^{2} (2.94 sq mi)
- Elevation: 432 m (1,417 ft)
- Highest elevation: 890 m (2,920 ft)
- Lowest elevation: 419 m (1,375 ft)
- Population (2023): 593
  - Density: 77.8/km^{2} (202/sq mi)
- Time zone: UTC+01:00 (CET)
  - Summer (DST): UTC+02:00 (CEST)
- INSEE/Postal code: 88467 /88290
- ^{1} French Land Register data, which excludes lakes, ponds, glaciers > 1 km^{2} (0.386 sq mi or 247 acres) and river estuaries.

Thiéfosse (French pronunciation: [tjefos]) is a commune in the Vosges department in Grand Est in northeastern France.

== See also ==
- Communes of the Vosges department
