= Ventron =

- Commune
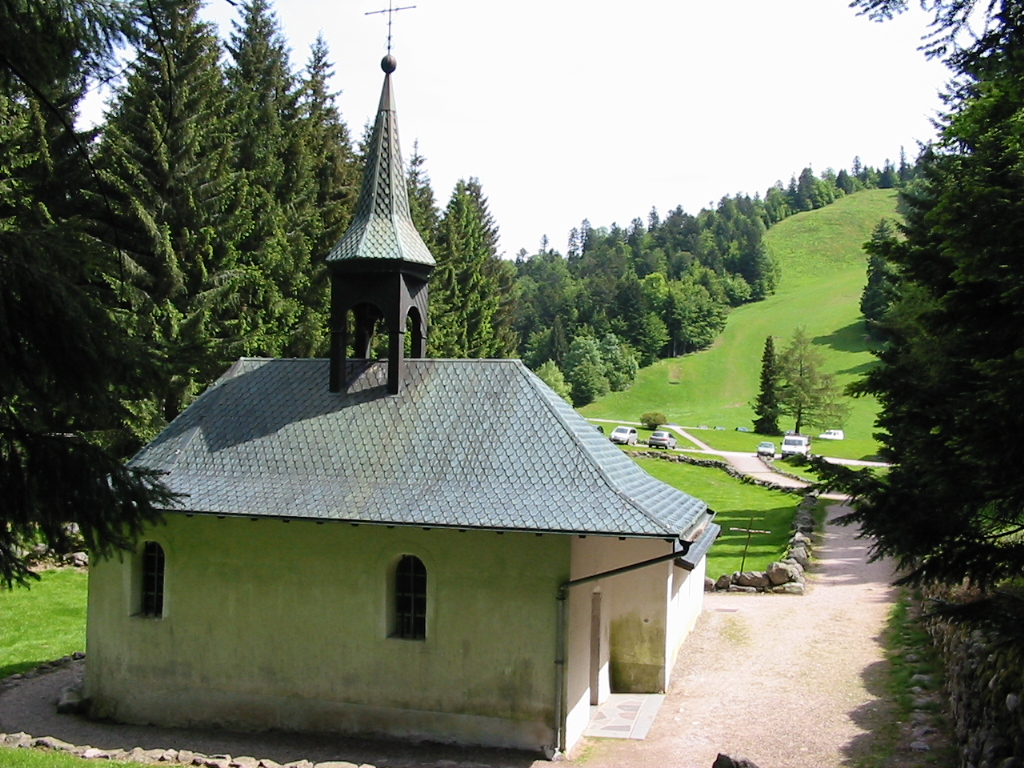
- Brother Joseph hermitage

- Coat of arms
- Location of Ventron
- Location within France Location within Grand Est
- Coordinates: 47°56′28″N 6°52′24″E
- Country: France
- Region: Grand Est
- Department: Vosges
- Arrondissement: Épinal
- Canton: La Bresse
- Intercommunality: CC Hautes Vosges

Government
  - Mayor (2020–2026): Brigitte Vanson
- Area^{1}: 24.97 km^{2} (9.64 sq mi)
- Elevation: 631 m (2,070 ft)
- Highest elevation: 1,202 m (3,944 ft)
- Lowest elevation: 570 m (1,870 ft)
- Population (2023): 805
  - Density: 32.2/km^{2} (83.5/sq mi)
- Time zone: UTC+01:00 (CET)
  - Summer (DST): UTC+02:00 (CEST)
- INSEE/Postal code: 88500 /88310
- ^{1} French Land Register data, which excludes lakes, ponds, glaciers > 1 km^{2} (0.386 sq mi or 247 acres) and river estuaries.

Ventron (French pronunciation: [vɛntʁɔ̃]; German: Winterung) is a commune in the Vosges department in Grand Est in northeastern France.

== See also ==
- Communes of the Vosges department
