= Canton of La Bresse =

Coordinates: 48.00°N 6.87°E

The canton of La Bresse is an administrative division of the Vosges department, in northeastern France. It was created at the French canton reorganisation which came into effect in March 2015. Its seat is in La Bresse.

It consists of the following communes:

1. Basse-sur-le-Rupt
2. La Bresse
3. Cornimont
4. Faucompierre
5. La Forge
6. Gerbamont
7. Rochesson
8. Sapois
9. Saulxures-sur-Moselotte
10. Le Syndicat
11. Tendon
12. Thiéfosse
13. Le Tholy
14. Vagney
15. Ventron
