= Rochesson =

- Commune
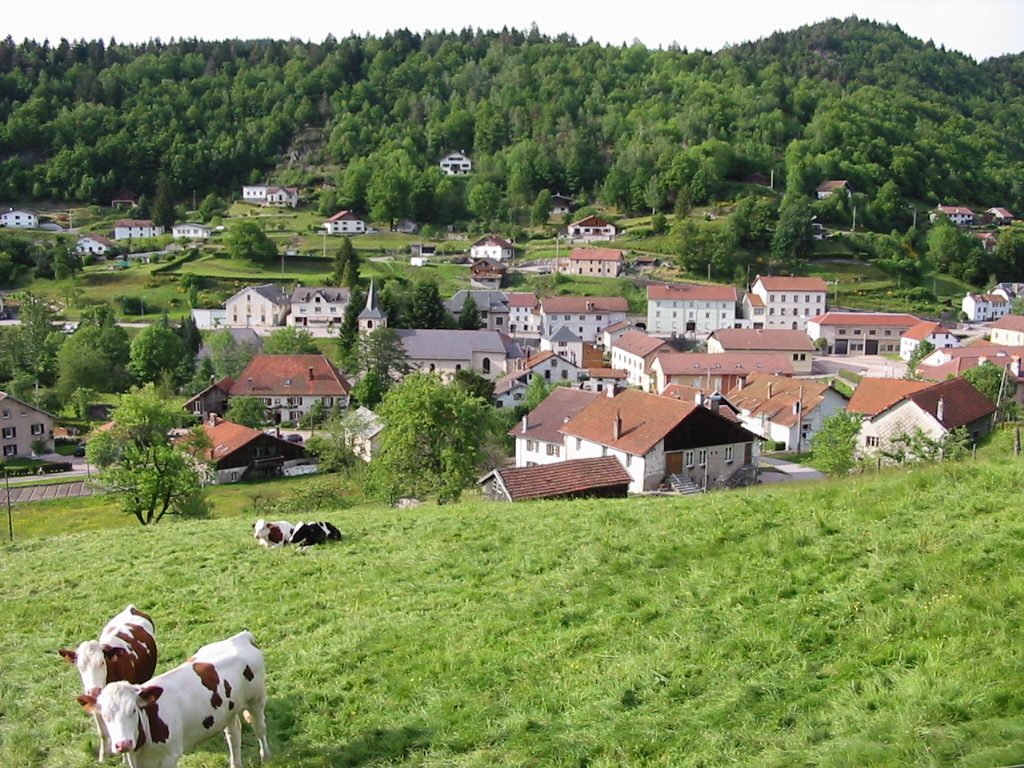
- A general view of Rochesson

- Coat of arms
- Location of Rochesson
- Location within France Location within Grand Est
- Coordinates: 48°01′23″N 6°47′11″E
- Country: France
- Region: Grand Est
- Department: Vosges
- Arrondissement: Épinal
- Canton: La Bresse
- Intercommunality: CC Hautes Vosges

Government
  - Mayor (2020–2026): Jeannine Bastien
- Area^{1}: 21.49 km^{2} (8.30 sq mi)
- Highest elevation: 1,060 m (3,480 ft)
- Lowest elevation: 497 m (1,631 ft)
- Population (2023): 676
  - Density: 31.5/km^{2} (81.5/sq mi)
- Time zone: UTC+01:00 (CET)
  - Summer (DST): UTC+02:00 (CEST)
- INSEE/Postal code: 88391 /88120
- ^{1} French Land Register data, which excludes lakes, ponds, glaciers > 1 km^{2} (0.386 sq mi or 247 acres) and river estuaries.

Rochesson (French pronunciation: [ʁɔʃɛsɔ̃]) is a commune in the Vosges department in Grand Est in northeastern France. According to the 2023 census there was 676 inhabitants.

== See also ==
- Communes of the Vosges department
