= La Bresse =

- Commune
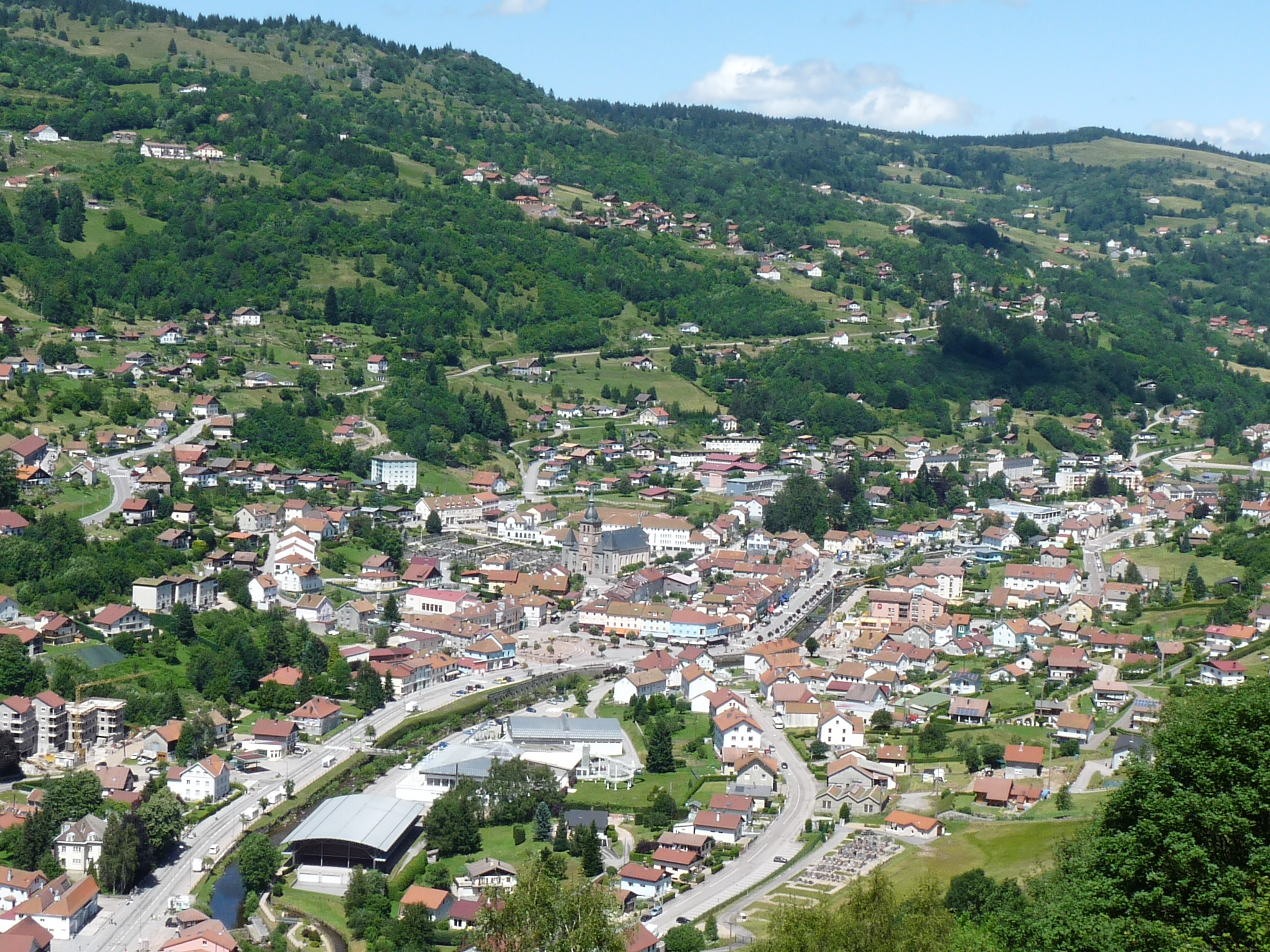
- The centre of La Bresse, seen from the Roche du Daval

- Coat of arms
- Location of La Bresse
- Location within France Location within Grand Est
- Coordinates: 48°00′24″N 6°52′36″E
- Country: France
- Region: Grand Est
- Department: Vosges
- Arrondissement: Épinal
- Canton: La Bresse
- Intercommunality: CC Hautes Vosges

Government
  - Mayor (2020–2026): Maryvonne Crouvezier
- Area^{1}: 57.94 km^{2} (22.37 sq mi)
- Elevation: 635 m (2,083 ft)
- Highest elevation: 1,366 m (4,482 ft)
- Lowest elevation: 580 m (1,900 ft)
- Population (2023): 3,853
  - Density: 66.50/km^{2} (172.2/sq mi)
- Time zone: UTC+01:00 (CET)
  - Summer (DST): UTC+02:00 (CEST)
- INSEE/Postal code: 88075 /88250
- ^{1} French Land Register data, which excludes lakes, ponds, glaciers > 1 km^{2} (0.386 sq mi or 247 acres) and river estuaries.

La Bresse (French pronunciation: [la bʁɛs]) is a commune in the Vosges department in Grand Est in northeastern France. The area is known for its ski resorts and outdoor activities.

La Bresse is located about 45 km west of Colmar and 55 km north west of Mulhouse in the valley of the Moselotte river within the Vosges regional park.

== Population ==
Historical population
Year	Pop.	±% p.a.
1968	5,290	—
1975	5,395	+0.28%
1982	5,369	−0.07%
1990	5,191	−0.42%
1999	4,928	−0.58%
2007	4,700	−0.59%
2012	4,355	−1.51%
2017	4,154	−0.94%
2023	3,853	−1.25%
Source: INSEE

== See also ==
- Communes of the Vosges department
- Hohneck
- Kastelberg
