= Cornimont =

- Commune
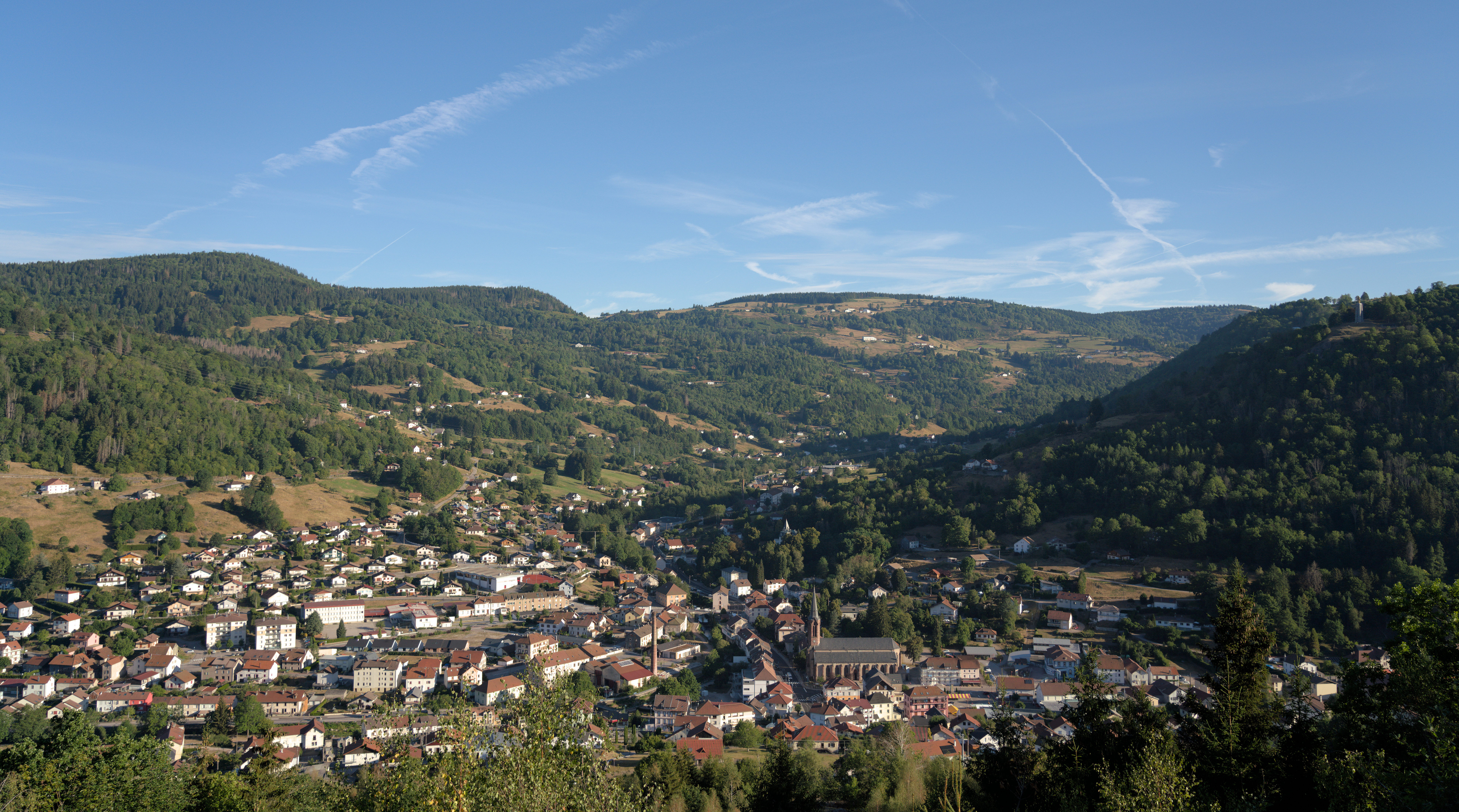
- View of Cornimont from the mission cross.

- Coat of arms
- Location of Cornimont
- Location within France Location within Grand Est
- Coordinates: 47°57′50″N 6°50′23″E
- Country: France
- Region: Grand Est
- Department: Vosges
- Arrondissement: Épinal
- Canton: La Bresse
- Intercommunality: CC Hautes Vosges

Government
  - Mayor (2020–2026): Marie-Josèphe Clement
- Area^{1}: 40.23 km^{2} (15.53 sq mi)
- Highest elevation: 1,205 m (3,953 ft)
- Lowest elevation: 493 m (1,617 ft)
- Population (2023): 3,027
  - Density: 75.24/km^{2} (194.9/sq mi)
- Time zone: UTC+01:00 (CET)
  - Summer (DST): UTC+02:00 (CEST)
- INSEE/Postal code: 88116 /88310
- ^{1} French Land Register data, which excludes lakes, ponds, glaciers > 1 km^{2} (0.386 sq mi or 247 acres) and river estuaries.

Cornimont (French pronunciation: [kɔʁnimɔ̃]; German: Hornenberg) is a commune in the Vosges department in Grand Est in northeastern France.

== History ==
A World War II tank battle was fought in Cornimont at Haut-du-Faing on 16 October 1944.

== Population ==
Historical population
Year	Pop.	±% p.a.
1968	5,021	—
1975	5,211	+0.53%
1982	4,556	−1.90%
1990	4,042	−1.49%
1999	3,861	−0.51%
2007	3,732	−0.42%
2012	3,473	−1.43%
2017	3,208	−1.57%
2023	3,027	−0.96%
Source: INSEE

== See also ==
- Communes of the Vosges department
