= Saulxures-sur-Moselotte =

- Commune
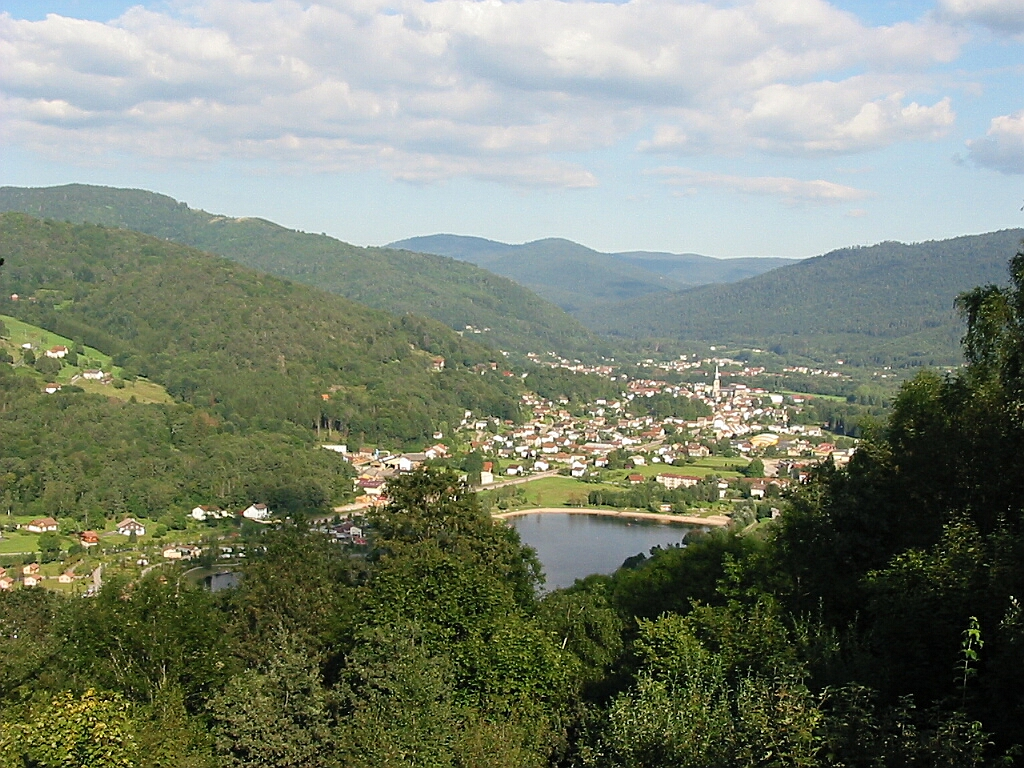
- A general view of Saulxures-sur-Moselotte

- Coat of arms
- Location of Saulxures-sur-Moselotte
- Location within France Location within Grand Est
- Coordinates: 47°57′00″N 6°46′11″E
- Country: France
- Region: Grand Est
- Department: Vosges
- Arrondissement: Épinal
- Canton: La Bresse
- Intercommunality: CC Hautes Vosges

Government
  - Mayor (2020–2026): Hervé Vaxelaire
- Area^{1}: 31.87 km^{2} (12.31 sq mi)
- Elevation: 464 m (1,522 ft)
- Highest elevation: 1,005 m (3,297 ft)
- Lowest elevation: 430 m (1,410 ft)
- Population (2023): 2,566
  - Density: 80.51/km^{2} (208.5/sq mi)
- Time zone: UTC+01:00 (CET)
  - Summer (DST): UTC+02:00 (CEST)
- INSEE/Postal code: 88447 /88290
- ^{1} French Land Register data, which excludes lakes, ponds, glaciers > 1 km^{2} (0.386 sq mi or 247 acres) and river estuaries.

Saulxures-sur-Moselotte (French pronunciation: [solsyʁ syʁ mozlɔt], literally Saulxures on Moselotte; German: Salzern) is a commune in the Vosges department in Grand Est in northeastern France.

== Population ==
Historical population
Year	Pop.	±% p.a.
1968	3,928	—
1975	3,794	−0.49%
1982	3,423	−1.46%
1990	3,211	−0.80%
1999	3,070	−0.50%
2007	2,830	−1.01%
2012	2,732	−0.70%
2017	2,588	−1.08%
2023	2,566	−0.14%
Source: INSEE

== See also ==
- Communes of the Vosges department
