= Vagney =

- Commune
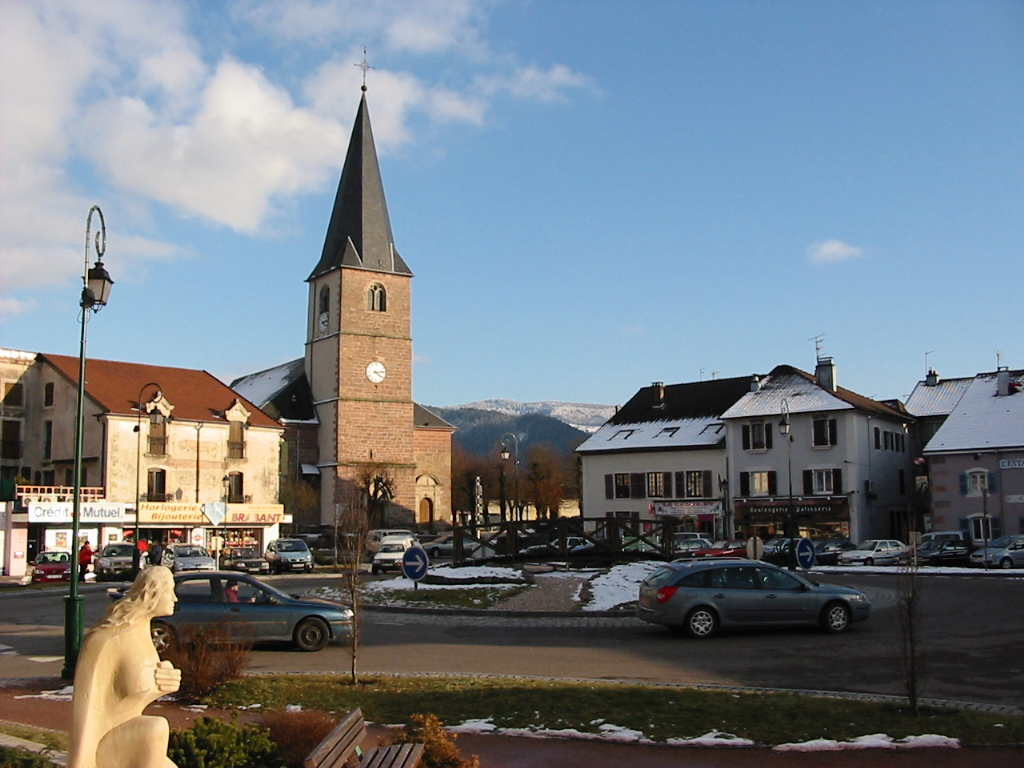
- The church and surroundings in Vagney

- Coat of arms
- Location of Vagney
- Location within France Location within Grand Est
- Coordinates: 48°00′33″N 6°43′02″E
- Country: France
- Region: Grand Est
- Department: Vosges
- Arrondissement: Épinal
- Canton: La Bresse
- Intercommunality: CC Hautes Vosges

Government
  - Mayor (2020–2026): Didier Houot
- Area^{1}: 24.91 km^{2} (9.62 sq mi)
- Highest elevation: 860 m (2,820 ft)
- Lowest elevation: 396 m (1,299 ft)
- Population (2023): 3,843
  - Density: 154.3/km^{2} (399.6/sq mi)
- Time zone: UTC+01:00 (CET)
  - Summer (DST): UTC+02:00 (CEST)
- INSEE/Postal code: 88486 /88120
- Website: www.vagney.eu
- ^{1} French Land Register data, which excludes lakes, ponds, glaciers > 1 km^{2} (0.386 sq mi or 247 acres) and river estuaries.

Vagney (French pronunciation: [vaɲɛ]) is a commune in the Vosges department in Grand Est in northeastern France.

== Population ==
Historical population
Year	Pop.	±% p.a.
1968	2,845	—
1975	3,248	+1.91%
1982	3,522	+1.16%
1990	3,772	+0.86%
1999	3,793	+0.06%
2007	3,965	+0.56%
2012	3,992	+0.14%
2017	3,925	−0.34%
2023	3,843	−0.35%
Source: INSEE

== See also ==
- Communes of the Vosges department
