= Le Tholy =

- Commune
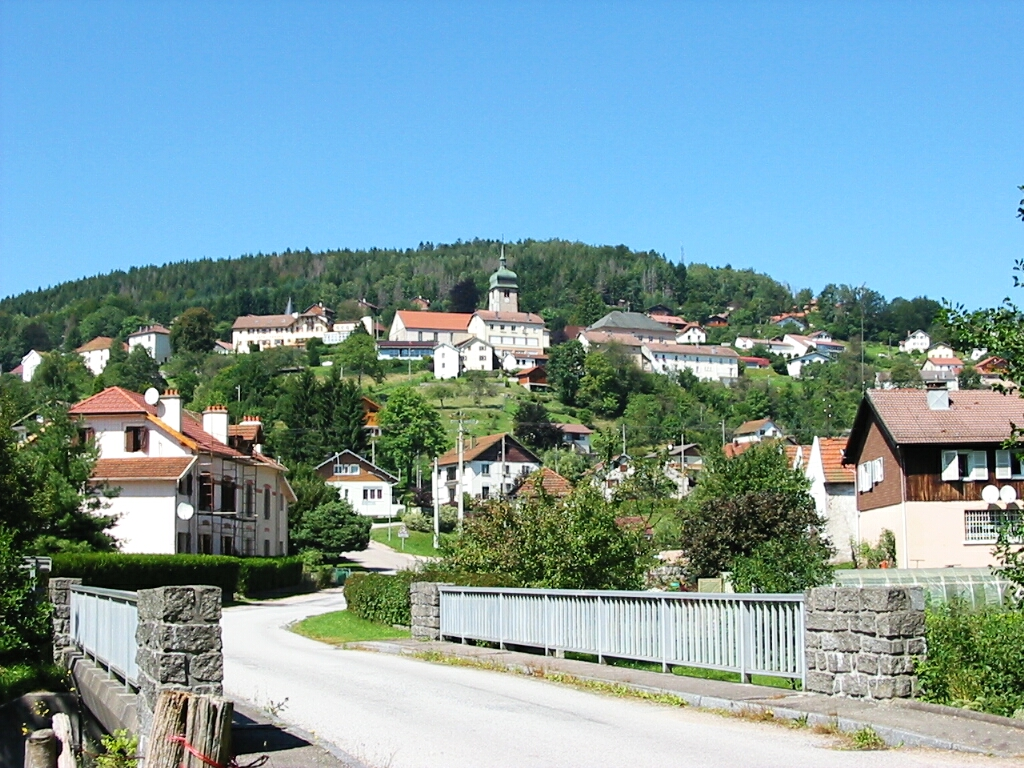
- A general view of Le Tholy

- Coat of arms
- Location of Le Tholy
- Location within France Location within Grand Est
- Coordinates: 48°05′01″N 6°44′41″E
- Country: France
- Region: Grand Est
- Department: Vosges
- Arrondissement: Saint-Dié-des-Vosges
- Canton: La Bresse
- Intercommunality: CC Gérardmer Hautes Vosges

Government
  - Mayor (2020–2026): Anicet Jacquemin
- Area^{1}: 30.76 km^{2} (11.88 sq mi)
- Highest elevation: 893 m (2,930 ft)
- Lowest elevation: 484 m (1,588 ft)
- Population (2023): 1,489
  - Density: 48.41/km^{2} (125.4/sq mi)
- Time zone: UTC+01:00 (CET)
  - Summer (DST): UTC+02:00 (CEST)
- INSEE/Postal code: 88470 /88530
- ^{1} French Land Register data, which excludes lakes, ponds, glaciers > 1 km^{2} (0.386 sq mi or 247 acres) and river estuaries.

Le Tholy (French pronunciation: [lə tɔli]) is a commune in the Vosges department in Grand Est in northeastern France.

== See also ==
- Communes of the Vosges department
